= Torpedo =

Self-propelled underwater weapon

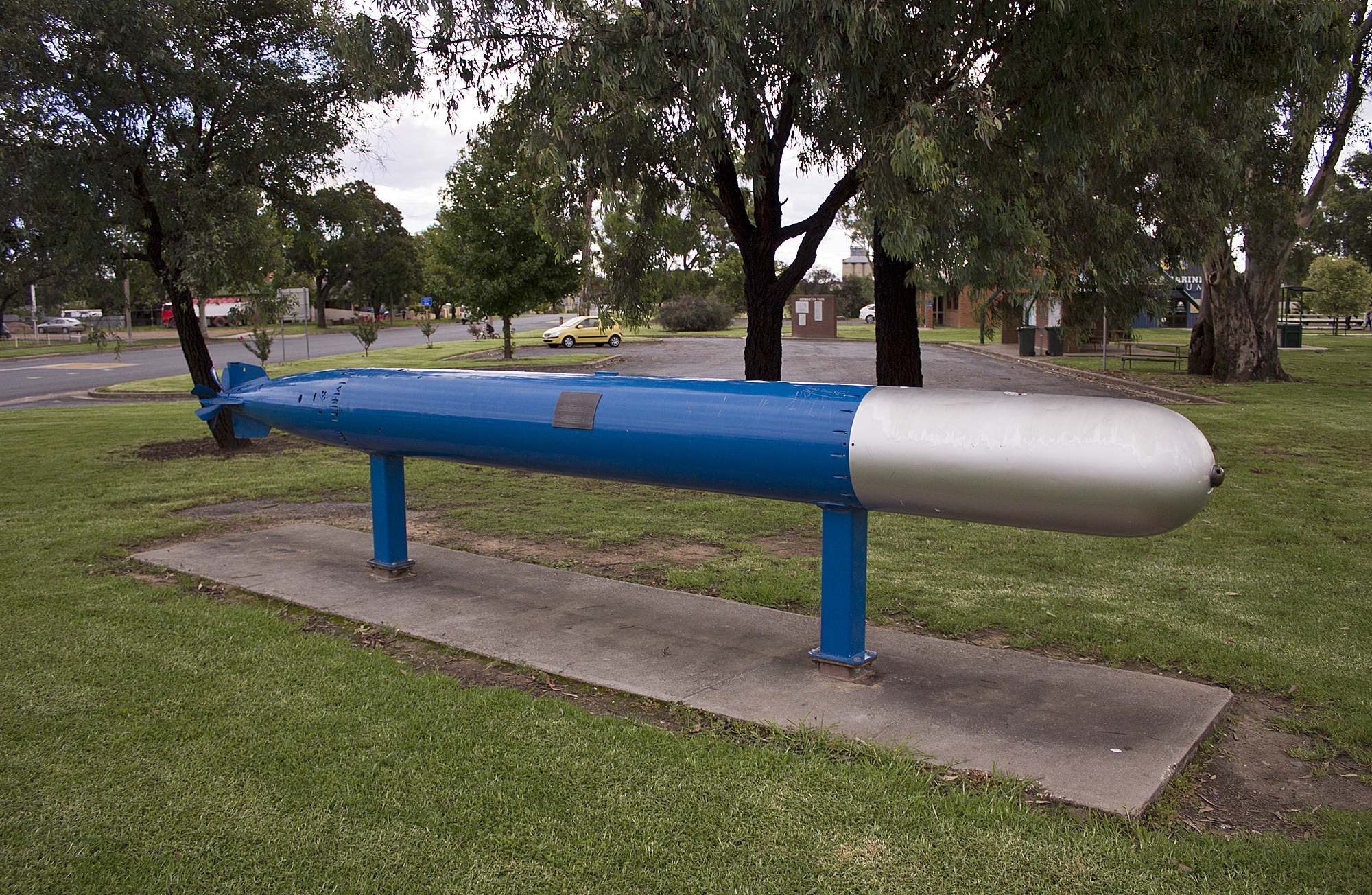
Bliss–Leavitt Mark 8 torpedo

A torpedo is an underwater ranged weapon launched above or below the water surface, self-propelled towards a target, with an explosive warhead designed to detonate either on contact with or in proximity to the target. Historically, such a device was called an automotive, automobile, eel, locomotive, or fish torpedo; colloquially, a fish.

The term torpedo originally applied to a variety of devices, most of which would today be called mines. From about 1900, torpedo has been used strictly to designate a self-propelled underwater explosive device.

While the 19th-century battleship had evolved primarily with a view to engagements between armored warships with large-caliber guns, the invention and refinement of torpedoes from the 1860s onwards allowed small torpedo boats and other lighter surface vessels, submarines/submersibles, even improvised fishing boats or frogmen, and later light aircraft, to destroy large ships without the need of large guns, though sometimes at the risk of being hit by longer-range artillery fire.

Modern torpedoes are classified variously as lightweight, heavyweight, straight-running, autonomous homers, and wire-guided types. They can be launched from a variety of platforms. In modern warfare, a submarine-launched torpedo is almost certain to hit its target; the best defense is a counterattack using another torpedo.

== Etymology ==
The word torpedo was first used as a name for electric rays (in the order Torpediniformes), which in turn comes from the Latin word torpēdō ("lethargy" or "sluggishness"). In naval usage, the American inventor David Bushnell was reported to have first used the term as the name of a submarine of his own design, the "American Turtle or Torpedo." This usage likely inspired Robert Fulton's use of the term to describe his stationary mines, and later Robert Whitehead's naming of the first self-propelled torpedo.

== History ==
=== Middle Ages ===
Surface-skimming incendiary weapons were tentatively proposed centuries before modern underwater torpedoes were successfully developed. For example, around 1280, engineer Hasan al-Rammah – who worked as a military scientist for the Mamluk Sultanate – described a conceptual rocket-propelled surface craft resembling an egg, designed to move across the surface of the water carrying an explosive and incendiary payload. While frequently cited as an early "torpedo," historians classify the device as a surface-skimming rocket rather than a submerged underwater missile.

=== Early naval mines ===
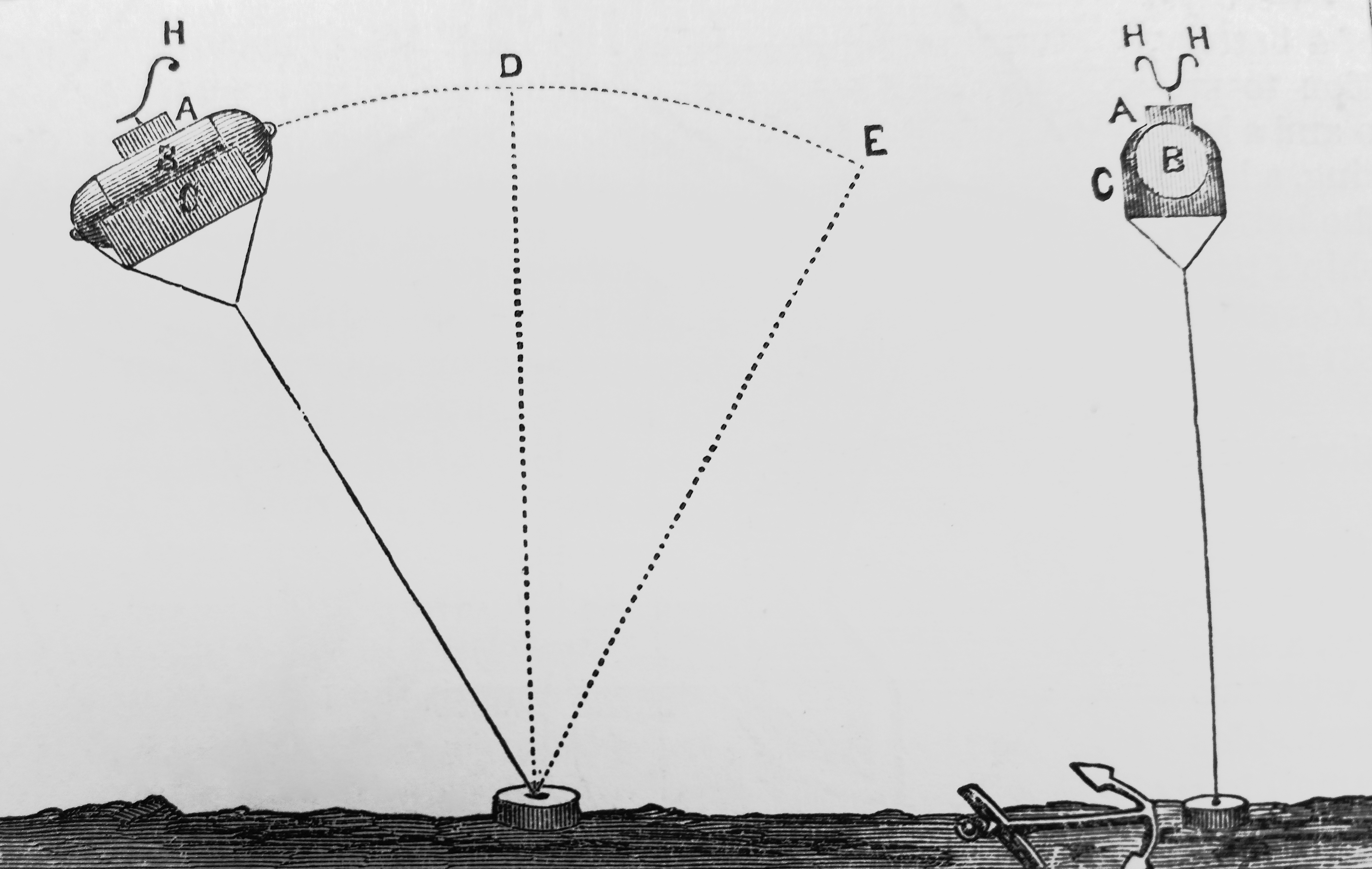
Fulton's torpedo

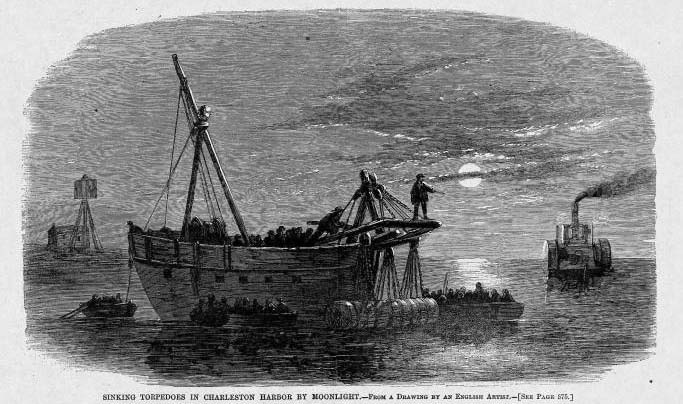
Confederates laying naval mines in Charleston Harbor

In modern language, a "torpedo" is an underwater self-propelled explosive, but historically, the term also applied to primitive naval mines and spar torpedoes. These were used on an ad-hoc basis during the early modern period up to the late 19th century.

In the early 17th century, the Dutchman Cornelius Drebbel, in the employ of King James I of England, invented the spar torpedo; he attached explosives to the end of a beam affixed to one of his submarines. These were used (to little effect) during the English expeditions to La Rochelle in 1626. The first use of a torpedo by a submarine was in 1775, by the American Turtle, which attempted to lay a bomb with a timed fuse on the hull of HMS Eagle during the American Revolutionary War, but failed in the attempt.

In the early 1800s, the American inventor Robert Fulton, while in France, "conceived the idea of destroying ships by introducing floating mines under their bottoms in submarine boats". He employed the term "torpedo" for the explosive charges with which he outfitted his submarine Nautilus. However, both the French and the Dutch governments were uninterested in the submarine. Fulton then concentrated on developing the torpedo-like weapon independent of a submarine deployment, and in 1804 succeeded in convincing the British government to employ his "catamaran" against the French. An April 1804 torpedo attack on French ships anchored at Boulogne, and a follow-up attack in October, produced several explosions but no significant damage, and the weapon was abandoned.

Fulton carried out a demonstration for the US government on 20 July 1807, destroying a vessel in New York's harbor. Further development languished as Fulton focused on his "steam-boat matters". After the War of 1812 broke out, the Royal Navy established a blockade of the East Coast of the United States. During the war, American forces unsuccessfully attempted to destroy the British ship-of-the-line HMS Ramillies while it was lying at anchor in New London, Connecticut's harbor with torpedoes launched from small boats. This prompted the captain of Ramillies, Sir Thomas Hardy, 1st Baronet, to warn the Americans to cease using this "cruel and unheard-of warfare" or he would "order every house near the shore to be destroyed". The fact that Hardy had been previously so lenient and considerate to the Americans led them to abandon such attempts with immediate effect.

Torpedoes were used by the Russian Empire during the Crimean War in 1855 against British warships in the Gulf of Finland. They used an early form of chemical detonator. During the American Civil War, the term torpedo was used for what is today called a contact mine, floating on or below the water surface using an air-filled demijohn or similar flotation device. These devices were very primitive and apt to prematurely explode. They would be detonated on contact with the ship or after a set time, although electrical detonators were also occasionally used. In 1862, the USS Cairo became the first warship to be sunk by an electrically-detonated mine. Spar torpedoes were also used; an explosive device was mounted at the end of a spar up to 10 metres (30 ft) long projecting forward underwater from the bow of the attacking vessel, which would then ram the opponent with the explosives. These were used by the Confederate submarine H. L. Hunley to sink the USS Housatonic, although the weapon was apt to cause as much harm to its user as to its target. Rear Admiral David Farragut's famous/apocryphal command during the Battle of Mobile Bay in 1864, "Damn the torpedoes, full speed ahead!", refers to a minefield laid at Mobile, Alabama.

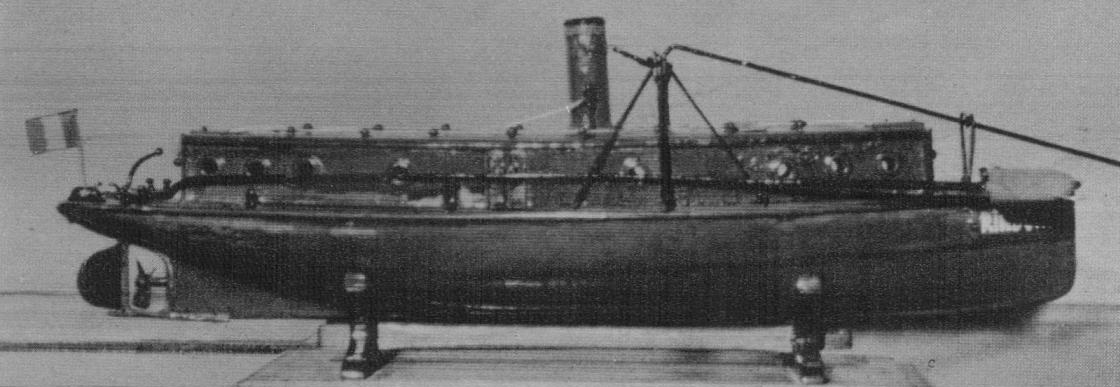
NMS Rândunica

On 26 May 1877, during the Romanian War of Independence, the Romanian spar torpedo boat Rândunica attacked and sank the Ottoman river monitor Seyfi. This was the first instance in history when a torpedo boat sank its targets without also sinking.

=== Invention of the modern torpedo ===
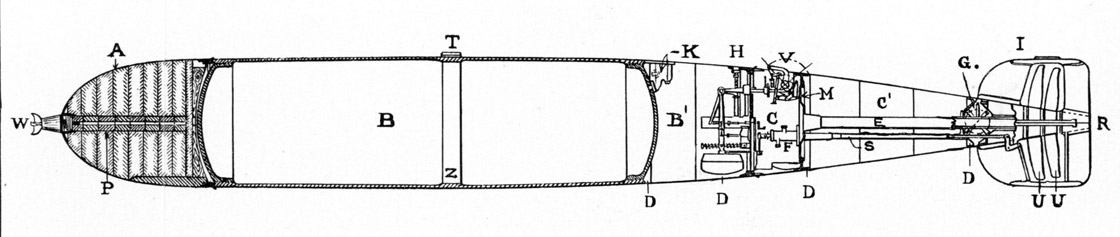
Whitehead torpedo's general profile: A. war-head; B. air-flask.; B'. immersion chamber; C'. after-body; C. engine room; D. drain holes; E. shaft tube; F. steering-engine; G. bevel gear box; H. depth index; I. tail; K. charging and stop-valves; L. locking-gear; M. engine bed-plate; P. primer case; R. rudder; S. steering-rod tube; T. guide stud; U. propellers; V. valve-group; W. war nose; Z. strengthening band

A prototype of the self-propelled torpedo was created on a commission placed by Giovanni Luppis, an Austro-Hungarian naval officer from Fiume (modern-day Rijeka in Croatia), at the time a port city of the Austro-Hungarian Monarchy, and Robert Whitehead, an English engineer who was the manager of a town factory, Stabilimento Tecnico di Fiume (STF). In 1864, Luppis presented Whitehead with the plans of the Salvacoste ("Coastsaver"), a floating weapon driven by ropes from the land that had been dismissed by the naval authorities due to the impractical steering and propulsion mechanisms.

Whitehead was unable to improve the machine substantially, since the clockwork motor, attached ropes, and surface attack mode all contributed to a slow and cumbersome weapon. However, he kept considering the problem after the contract had finished, and eventually developed a tubular device, designed to run underwater on its own, and powered by compressed air. The result was a submarine weapon: the Minenschiff (mine ship), later known eponymously as the Whitehead torpedo, the first modern self-propelled torpedo, was officially presented to the Austrian Imperial Naval commission on 21 December 1866.

The first trials were not successful, as the weapon was unable to maintain a course at a steady depth. After much work, Whitehead introduced his "secret" in 1868 which overcame this. It was a mechanism consisting of a hydrostatic valve and pendulum that caused the torpedo's hydroplanes to be adjusted to maintain a preset depth. French and German inventions followed closely, and the term torpedo came to describe self-propelled projectiles that traveled under or on water. By 1900, the term no longer included mines and booby-traps, as the navies of the world added submarines, torpedo boats, and torpedo boat destroyers to their fleets.

=== Production and spread ===
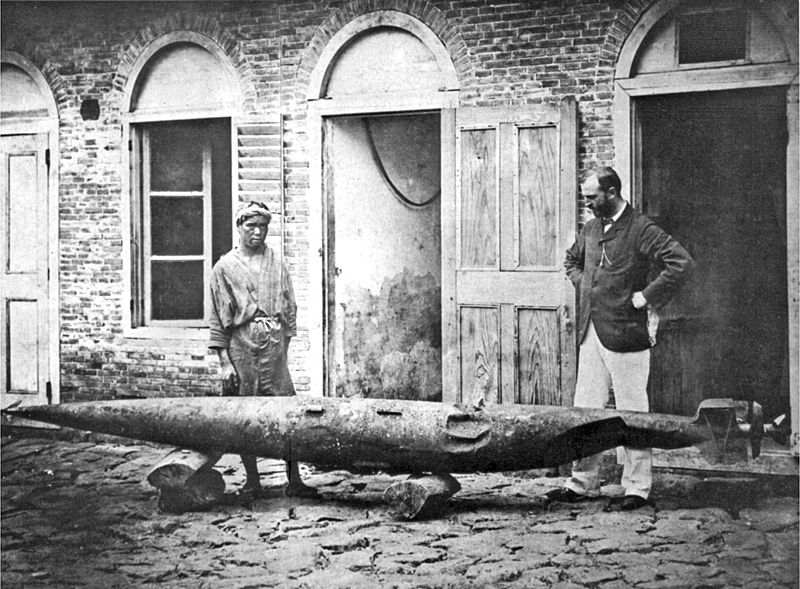
Robert Whitehead (right) invented the modern torpedo in 1866. Pictured examining a battered test torpedo in Fiume (Rijeka) c. 1875.

The Austrian government decided to invest in the invention, and the factory in Fiume started producing more Whitehead torpedoes. In 1870, he improved the devices to travel up to approximately 900 metres (1,000 yd) at a speed of up to 6 knots (11 km/h). Royal Navy (RN) representatives visited Fiume for a demonstration in late 1869, and in 1870 a batch of torpedoes was ordered. In 1871, the British Admiralty paid Whitehead £15,000 for certain of his developments, and production started at the Royal Laboratories in Woolwich the following year.

The company in Fiume went bankrupt in 1873, but was reformed as Whitehead Torpedo Works a few years later, and by 1881 it was exporting torpedoes to ten other countries. The torpedo was powered by compressed air and had an explosive charge of gun-cotton. Whitehead went on to develop more efficient devices, demonstrating torpedoes capable of 18 knots (33 km/h) in 1876, 24 knots (44 km/h) in 1886, and, finally, 30 knots (56 km/h) in 1890.

In the 1880s, a British committee, informed by hydrodynamicist Dr. R. E. Froude, conducted comparative tests and determined that a blunt nose, contrary to prior assumptions, did not hinder speed: in fact, the blunt nose provided a speed advantage of approximately one knot compared to the traditional pointed-nose design. This discovery allowed for larger explosive payloads and increased air storage for propulsion without compromising speed.

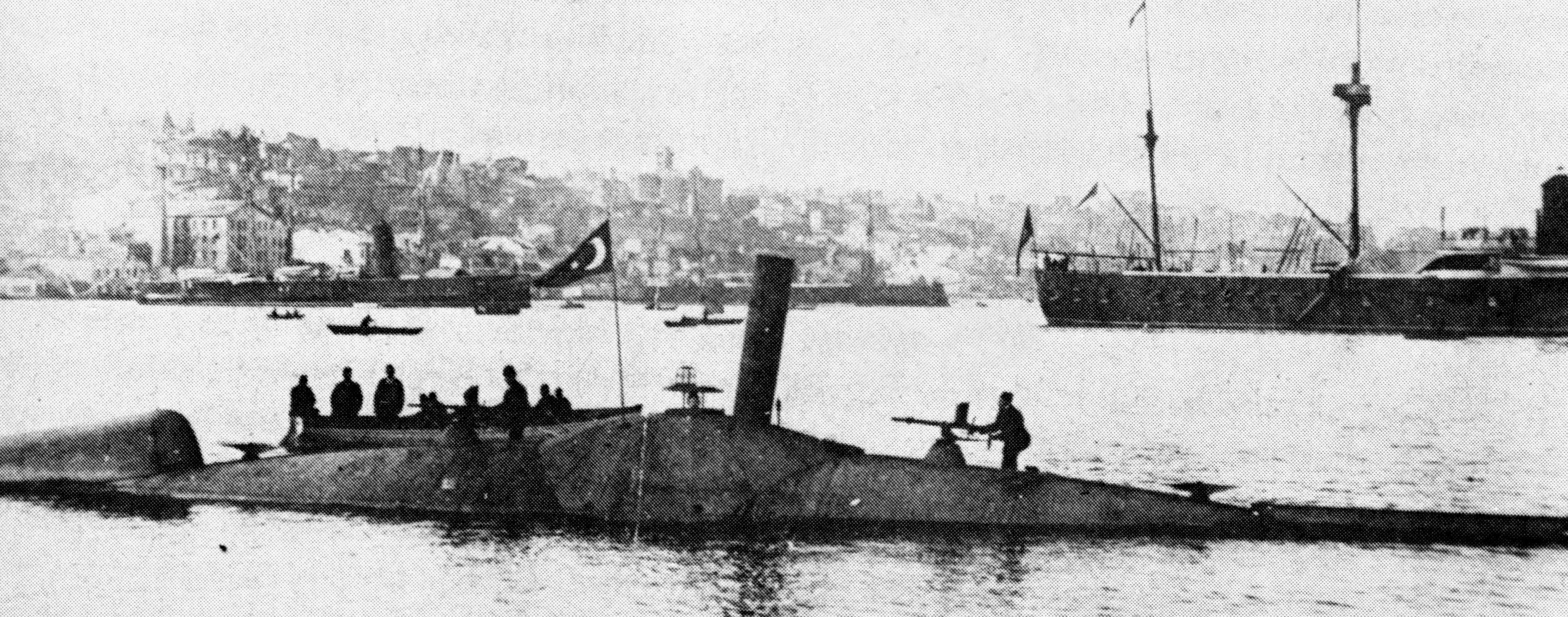
The Nordenfelt-class Ottoman submarine Abdülhamid (1886) was the first submarine in history to fire a torpedo while submerged.

Whitehead opened a new factory adjacent to Portland Harbour, England, in 1890, which continued making torpedoes until the end of World War II. Because orders from the RN were not as large as expected, torpedoes were mostly exported. A series of devices was produced at Fiume, with diameters from 36 cm (14 in) upward. The largest Whitehead torpedo was 46 cm (18 in) in diameter and 5.8 m (19 ft) long, made of polished steel or phosphor bronze, with a 90-kilogram (200 lb) gun-cotton warhead. It was propelled by a three-cylinder Brotherhood radial engine, using compressed air at around 9.0 MPa (1,300 psi) and driving two contra-rotating propellers, and was designed to self-regulate its course and depth as far as possible. By 1881, nearly 1,500 torpedoes had been produced. Whitehead also opened a factory at St Tropez in 1890 that exported torpedoes to Brazil, the Netherlands, Turkey, and Greece.

Whitehead purchased rights to the gyroscope of Ludwig Obry in 1888, but it was not sufficiently accurate, so in 1890 he purchased a better design to improve control of his designs, which came to be called the "Devil's Device". The firm of L. Schwartzkopff in Germany also produced torpedoes and exported them to Russia, Japan, and Spain. In 1885, Britain ordered a batch of 50 as torpedo production at home and Fiume could not meet demand.

In 1893, Royal Navy torpedo production was transferred to the Royal Gun Factory. The British later established a Torpedo Experimental Establishment at HMS Vernon and a production facility at the Royal Naval Torpedo Factory, Greenock, in 1910. These are now closed.

By World War I, Whitehead's torpedo remained a worldwide success, and his company was able to maintain a monopoly on torpedo production. By that point, his torpedo had grown to a diameter of 46 cm (18 in) with a maximum speed of 30.5 knots (56.5 km/h) with a warhead weighing 77 kilograms (170 lb).

Whitehead faced competition from the American Lieutenant Commander John A. Howell, whose design, driven by a flywheel, was simpler and cheaper. It was produced from 1885 to 1895, and it ran straight, leaving no wake. A Torpedo Test Station was set up in Rhode Island in 1870. The Howell torpedo was the only United States Navy model until an American company, Bliss and Williams, secured manufacturing rights to produce Whitehead torpedoes. These were put into service for the U.S. Navy in 1892. Five varieties were produced, all 46 cm (18 in) in diameter.

The Royal Navy introduced the Brotherhood wet heater engine in 1907 with the 46 cm (18 in) Mk. VII & VII*, which greatly increased the speed and range over compressed-air engines, and wet heater type engines became the standard in many major navies up to and during the Second World War.

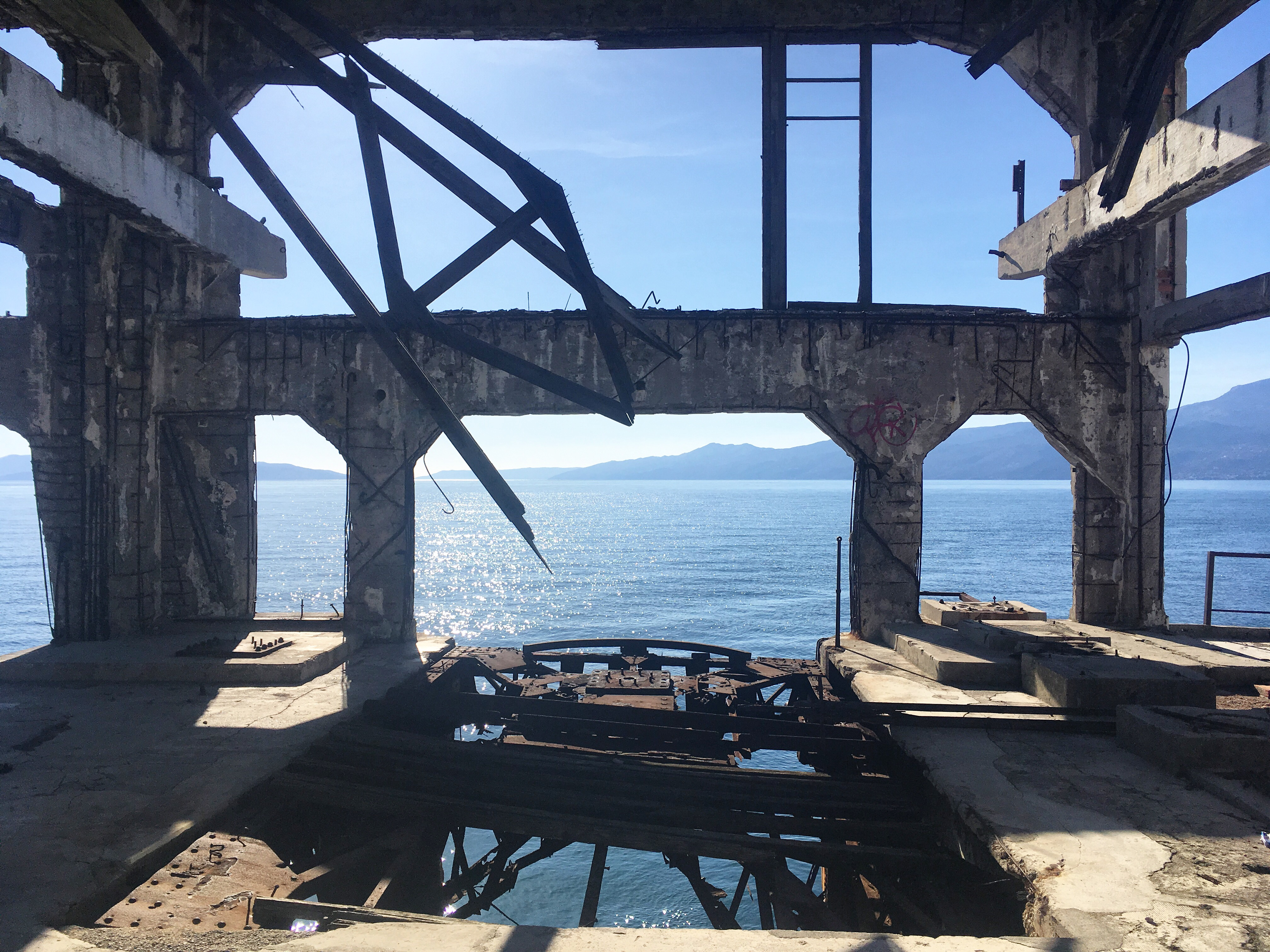
The first modern-day torpedo launching station in Rijeka, 2020

=== Torpedo boats and guidance systems ===
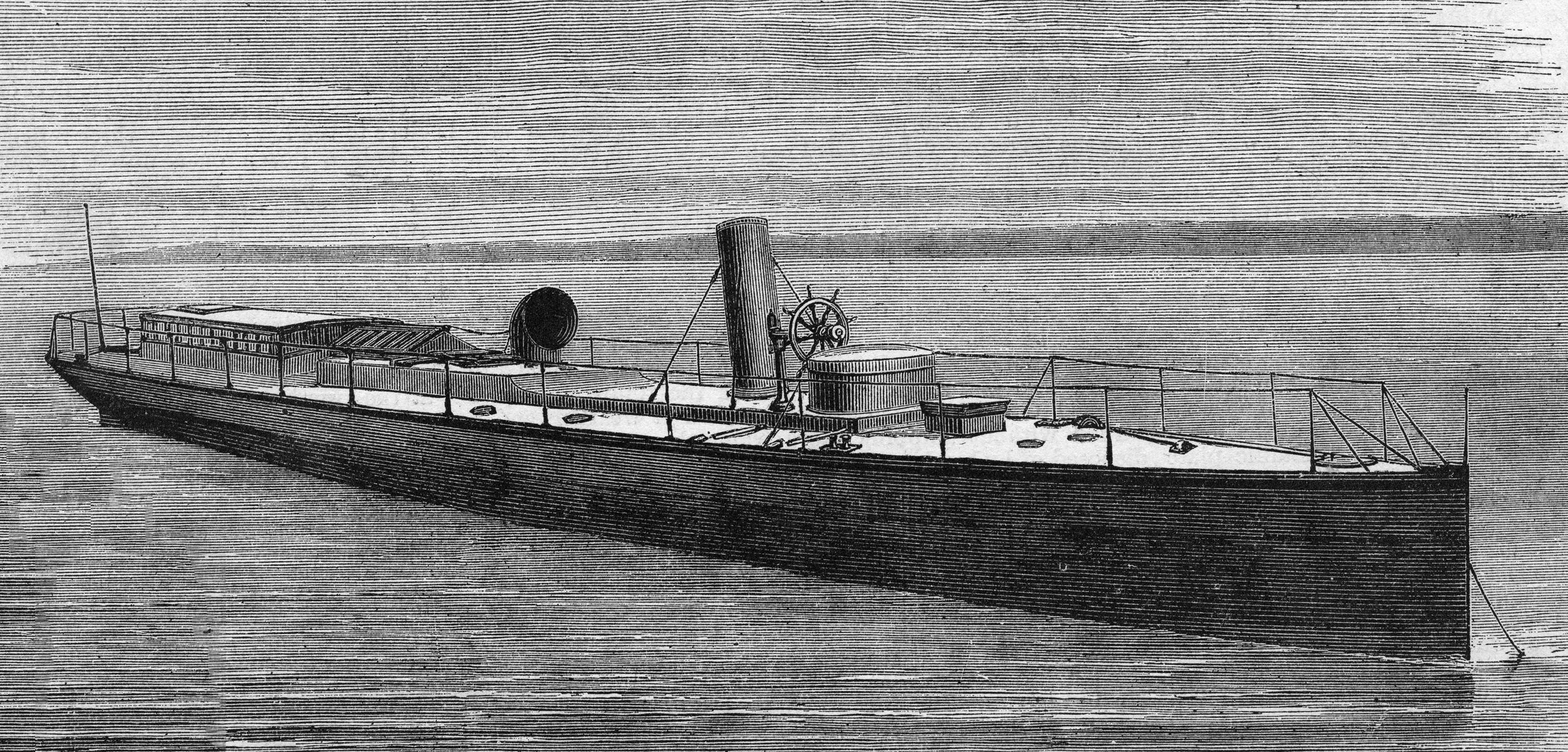
HMS Lightning, built in 1877 as a small attack boat armed with torpedoes.

Ships of the line were superseded by ironclads, large steam-powered ships with heavy gun armament and heavy armor, in the mid-19th century. Ultimately this line of development led to the dreadnought category of all-big-gun battleships, starting with HMS Dreadnought.

Although these ships were incredibly powerful, the new weight of armor slowed them down, and the huge guns needed to penetrate that armor fired at very slow rates. The development of torpedoes allowed for the possibility that small and fast vessels could credibly threaten if not sink even the most powerful battleships. While such attacks would carry enormous risks to the attacking boats and their crews (which would likely need to expose themselves to artillery fire which their small vessels were not designed to withstand), this was offset by the ability to construct large numbers of small vessels far more quickly and for a much lower unit cost compared to a capital ship.

The first boat designed to fire the self-propelled Whitehead torpedo was HMS Lightning, completed in 1877. The French Navy followed suit in 1878 with Torpilleur No 1, launched in 1878, though she had been ordered in 1875. The first torpedo boats were built at the shipyards of Sir John Thornycroft and gained recognition for their effectiveness.

At the same time, inventors were working on building a guided torpedo. Prototypes were built by John Ericsson, John Louis Lay, and Victor von Scheliha, but the first practical guided missile was patented by Louis Brennan, an emigre to Australia, in 1877.

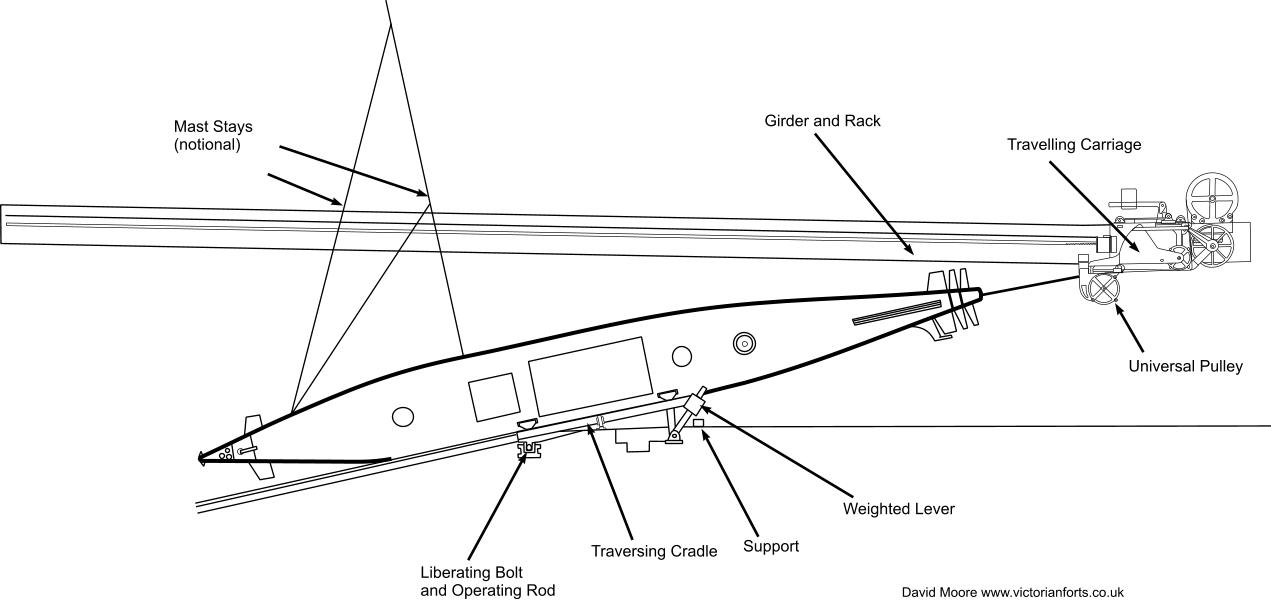
The Brennan torpedo was the first practical guided torpedo.

It was designed to run at a consistent depth of 4 metres (12 ft), and was fitted with an indicator mast that just broke the surface of the water. At night the mast had a small light, visible only from the rear. Two steel drums were mounted one behind the other inside the torpedo, each carrying several thousand metres of high-tensile steel wire. The drums connected via a differential gear to twin contra-rotating propellers. If one drum was rotated faster than the other, then the rudder was activated. The other ends of the wires were connected to steam-powered winding engines, which were arranged so that speeds could be varied within fine limits, giving sensitive steering control for the torpedo.

The torpedo attained a speed of 20 knots (37 km/h) using a wire 1.0 millimetre (0.04 in) in diameter, but later this was changed to 1.8 mm (0.07 in) to increase the speed to 27 knots (50 km/h). The torpedo was fitted with elevators controlled by a depth-keeping mechanism, and the fore and aft rudders operated by the differential between the drums.

Brennan traveled to Britain, where the Admiralty examined the torpedo and found it unsuitable for shipboard use. However, the War Office proved more amenable, and in early August 1881, a special Royal Engineer committee was instructed to inspect the torpedo at Chatham and report back directly to the Secretary of State for War, Hugh Childers. The report strongly recommended that an improved model be built at government expense. In 1883 an agreement was reached between the Brennan Torpedo Company and the government. The newly appointed Inspector-General of Fortifications in England, Sir Andrew Clarke, appreciated the value of the torpedo, and in spring 1883 an experimental station was established at Garrison Point Fort, Sheerness, on the River Medway, and a workshop for Brennan was set up at the Chatham Barracks, the home of the Royal Engineers. Between 1883 and 1885 the Royal Engineers held trials, and in 1886 the torpedo was recommended for adoption as a harbor defense torpedo. It was used throughout the British Empire for more than fifteen years.

=== Use in conflict ===
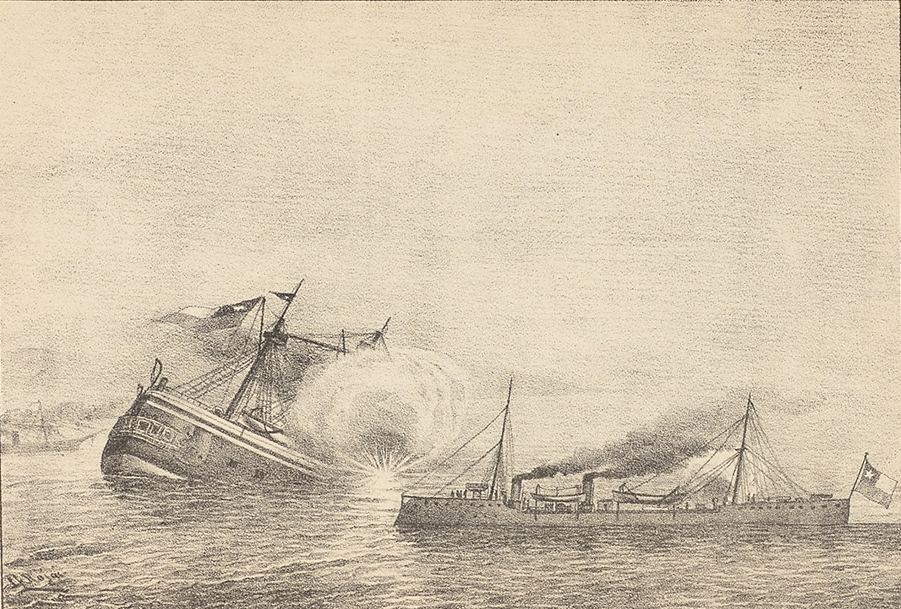
Sinking of Chilean ironclad Blanco Encalada by a torpedo in the Battle of Caldera Bay, during the Chilean Civil War of 1891.

The Royal Navy frigate HMS Shah was the first naval vessel to fire a self-propelled torpedo in anger during the Battle of Pacocha against rebel Peruvian ironclad Huáscar on 29 May 1877. The Peruvian ship successfully outran the device. On 16 January 1878, the Turkish steamer Intibah became the first vessel to be sunk by self-propelled torpedoes, launched from torpedo boats operating from the tender Velikiy Knyaz Konstantin under the command of Stepan Osipovich Makarov during the Russo-Turkish War of 1877–78.

In another early use of the torpedo, during the War of the Pacific, the Peruvian ironclad Huáscar commanded by captain Miguel Grau attacked the Chilean corvette Abtao on 28 August 1879 at Antofagasta with a self-propelled Lay torpedo only to have it reverse course. The Huascar was saved when an officer jumped overboard to divert it.

The Chilean ironclad Blanco Encalada was sunk on 23 April 1891 by a self-propelled torpedo from the Almirante Lynch, during the Chilean Civil War of 1891, becoming the first ironclad warship sunk by this weapon. The Chinese turret ship Dingyuan was purportedly hit and disabled by a torpedo after numerous attacks by Japanese torpedo boats during the First Sino-Japanese War in 1894. At this time torpedo attacks were still very close range and very dangerous to the attackers.

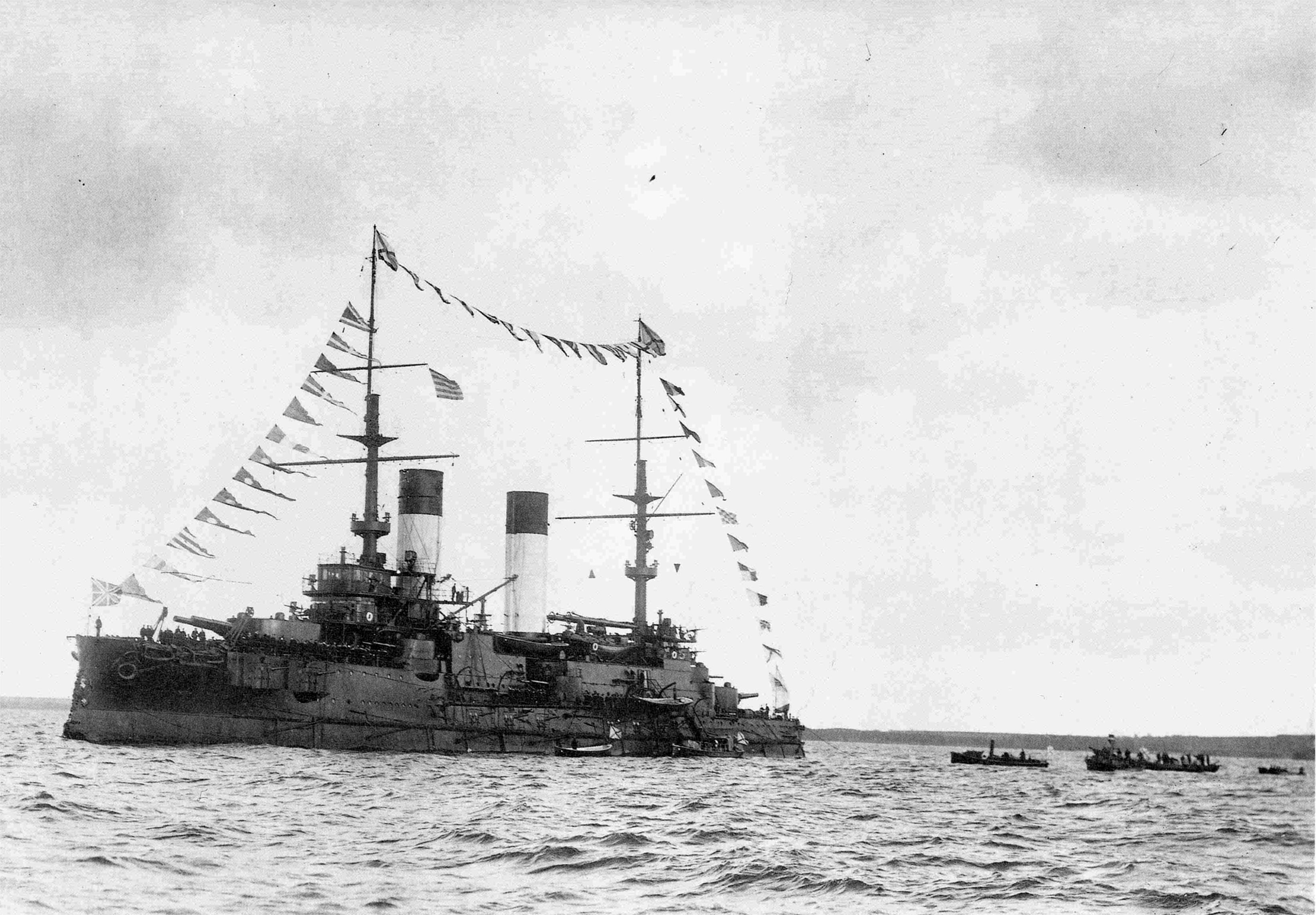
Knyaz Suvorov was sunk by Japanese torpedo boats during the Russo-Japanese War.

Several western sources reported that the Qing dynasty Imperial Chinese military, under the direction of Li Hongzhang, acquired electric torpedoes, which they deployed in numerous waterways, along with fortresses and numerous other modern military weapons acquired by China. At the Tientsin Arsenal in 1876, the Chinese developed the capacity to manufacture these "electric torpedoes" on their own. Although a form of Chinese art, the Nianhua, depict such torpedoes being used against Russian ships during the Boxer Rebellion, whether they were actually used in battle against them is undocumented and unknown.

The Russo-Japanese War (1904–1905) was the first great war of the 20th century. During the war, the Imperial Russian and Imperial Japanese navies launched nearly 300 torpedoes at each other, all of them of the "self-propelled automotive" type. The deployment of these new underwater weapons resulted in one battleship, two armored cruisers, and two destroyers being sunk in action, with the remainder of the roughly 80 warships being sunk by the more conventional methods of gunfire, mines, and scuttling.

On 27 May 1905, during the Battle of Tsushima, Admiral Rozhestvensky's flagship, the battleship Knyaz Suvorov, had been gunned to a wreck by Admiral Tōgō's 300 mm-gunned (12 in) battleline. With the Russians sunk and scattering, Tōgō prepared for pursuit, and while doing so ordered his torpedo boat destroyers (TBDs) (mostly referred to as just destroyers in most written accounts) to finish off the Russian battleship. Knyaz Suvorov was set upon by seventeen torpedo-firing warships, ten of which were destroyers and four torpedo boats. Twenty-one torpedoes were launched at the pre-dreadnought, and three struck home, one fired from the destroyer Murasame and two from torpedo boats No. 72 and No. 75. The flagship slipped under the waves shortly thereafter, taking over 900 men with her to the bottom.

On December 9, 1912, the Greek submarine Dolphin launched a torpedo against the Ottoman cruiser Medjidieh.

=== Aerial torpedo ===
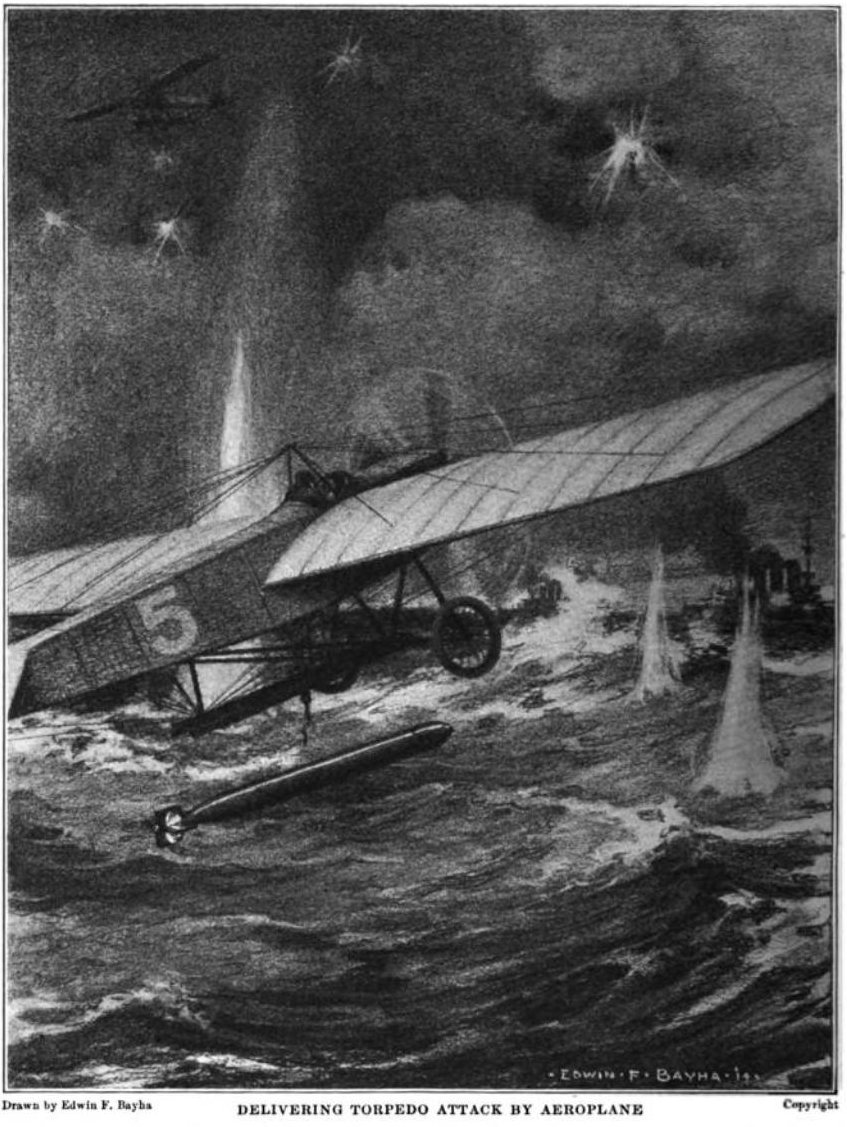
In 1915, Rear Admiral Bradley A. Fiske conceived of the aerial torpedo.

The end of the Russo-Japanese War fueled new theories, and the idea of dropping lightweight torpedoes from aircraft was conceived in the early 1910s by Bradley A. Fiske, an officer in the United States Navy. Awarded a patent in 1912, Fiske worked out the mechanics of carrying and releasing the aerial torpedo from a bomber, and defined tactics that included a night-time approach so that the target ship would be less able to defend itself. Fiske determined that the notional torpedo bomber should descend rapidly in a sharp spiral to evade enemy guns, then when about 3 to 6 metres (10 to 20 ft) above the water, the aircraft would straighten its flight long enough to line up with the torpedo's intended path. The aircraft would release the torpedo at a distance of 1,400 to 1,800 metres (1,500 to 2,000 yd) from the target. Fiske reported in 1915 that, using this method, enemy fleets could be attacked within their harbors if there was enough room for the torpedo track.

Meanwhile, the Royal Naval Air Service began actively experimenting with this possibility. The first successful aerial torpedo drop was performed by Gordon Bell in 1914 – dropping a Whitehead torpedo from a Short S.64 seaplane. The success of these experiments led to the construction of the first purpose-built operational torpedo aircraft, the Short Type 184, built-in 1915.

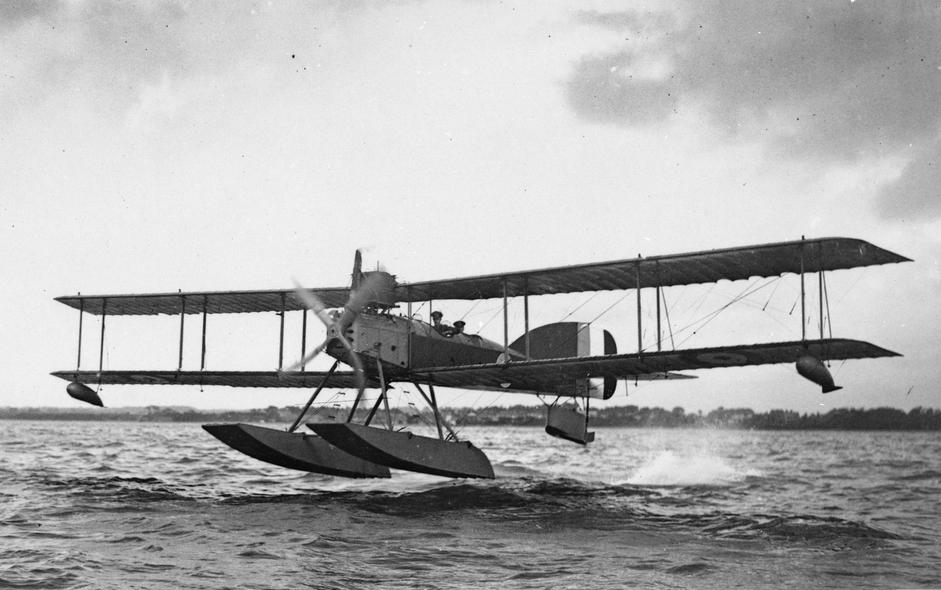
The Short Type 184 was the first torpedo aircraft when built-in 1915.

An order for ten aircraft was placed, and 936 aircraft were built by ten different British aircraft companies during the First World War. The two prototype aircraft were embarked upon HMS Ben-my-Chree, which sailed for the Aegean on 21 March 1915 to take part in the Gallipoli campaign. On 12 August 1915 one of these, piloted by Flight Commander Charles Edmonds, was the first aircraft in the world to attack an enemy ship with an air-launched torpedo.

On 17 August 1915 Flight Commander Edmonds torpedoed and sank an Ottoman transport ship a few miles north of the Dardanelles. His formation colleague, Flight Lieutenant G B Dacre, was forced to land on the water owing to engine trouble but, seeing an enemy tug close by, taxied up to it and released his torpedo, sinking the tug. Without the weight of the torpedo, Dacre was able to take off and return to Ben-My-Chree.

=== World War I ===
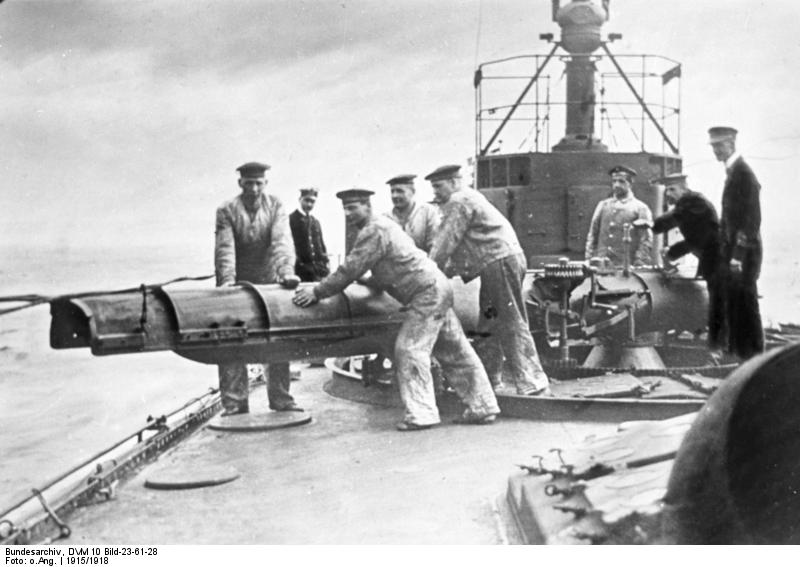
Launching a torpedo in 1915 during World War I

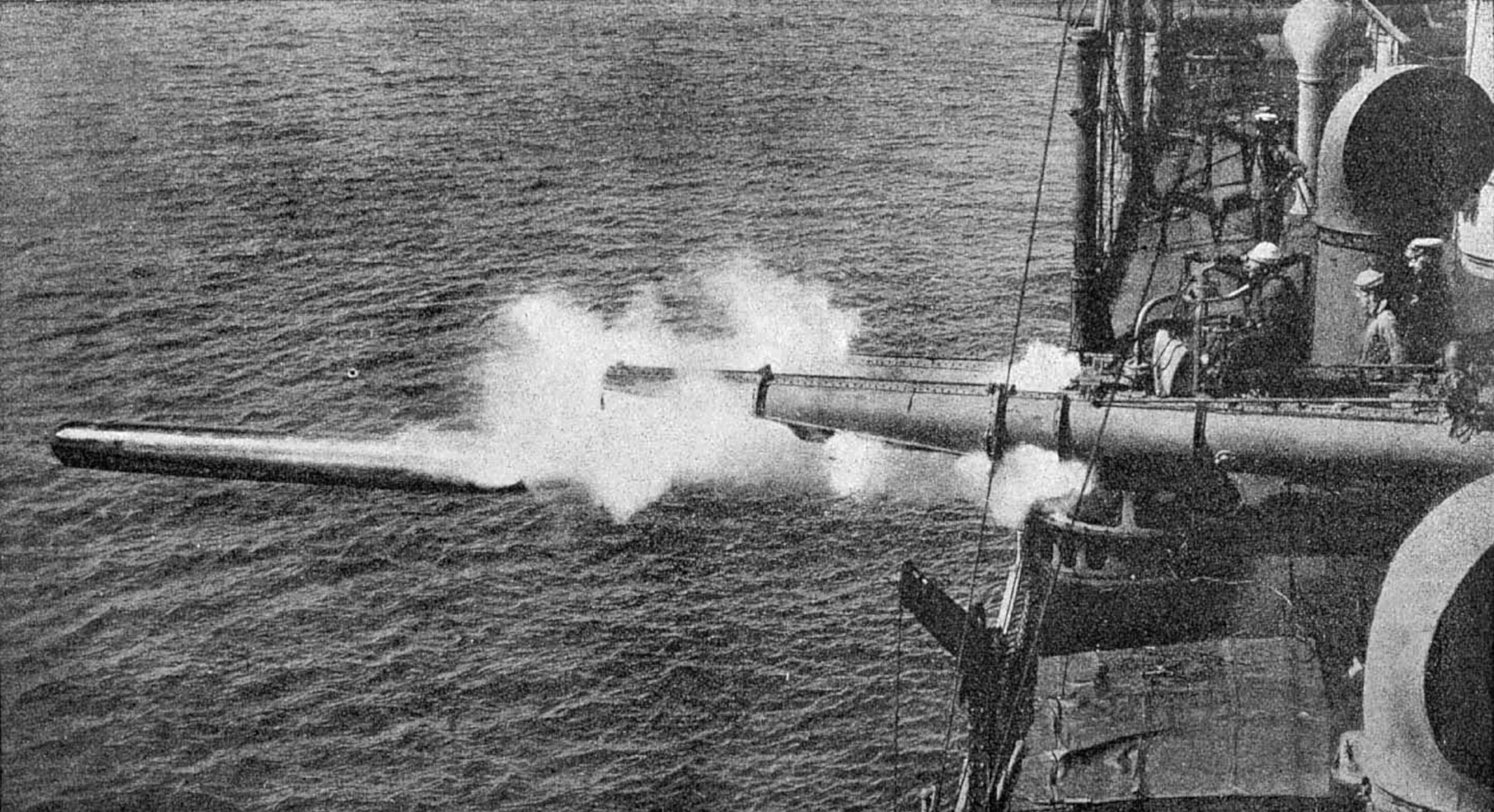
Torpedo launch in 1916

Torpedoes were widely used in the First World War, both against shipping and against submarines. Germany disrupted the supply lines to Britain largely by use of submarine torpedoes, though submarines also extensively used guns. Britain and its allies also used torpedoes throughout the war. U-boats themselves were often targeted, twenty being sunk by torpedo. Two Royal Italian Navy torpedo boats scored a success against an Austrian-Hungarian squadron, sinking the battleship SMS Szent István with two torpedoes. In May of 1915, the Imperial German Navy U-boat SM U-20 sank the RMS Lusitania off of the coast of Ireland with a torpedo, said torpedo caused her to founder in just eighteen minutes. This sparked international outrage at the Germans for killing nearly 1,200 civilian passengers aboard the ship. This would also later help contribute to the entry of the United States into World War I due to some of the passengers being Americans.

The Royal Navy had been experimenting with ways to further increase the range of torpedoes during World War 1 using pure oxygen instead of compressed air, this work ultimately leading to the development of the oxygen-enriched air 62 cm (24.5 in) Mk. I intended originally for the G3-class battlecruisers and N3 class battleships of 1921, both of which were cancelled due to the Washington Naval Treaty.

Initially, the Imperial Japanese Navy purchased Whitehead or Schwartzkopf torpedoes but by 1917, like the Royal Navy, they were conducting experiments with pure oxygen instead of compressed air. Because of explosions, they abandoned the experiments but resumed them in 1926 and by 1933 had a working torpedo. They also used conventional wet heater torpedoes.

=== World War II ===
In the inter-war years, financial stringency caused nearly all navies to skimp on testing their torpedoes. Only the British and Japanese had fully tested new technologies for torpedoes (in particular the Type 93, nicknamed Long Lance postwar by the US official historian Samuel E. Morison) at the start of World War II. Unreliable torpedoes caused many problems for the American submarine force in the early years of the war, primarily in the Pacific Theater.

By contrast, during the Second World War, Japanese torpedoes were superb. Japan had placed an emphasis on the weapon following numerous successes during the First Sino-Japanese and Russo-Japanese wars. The development of 61 cm torpedoes was borne out of a concept to use them as a decisive heavy weapon to work around the limitations of the Washington Naval Treaty, alongside other advances such as radar. Furthermore, before the outbreak of war, Japan had expected to use the submarine (as opposed to the aircraft carrier) as the decisive combatant with which to harass and decimate the United States Navy, a decision which eventually proved to be disastrously incorrect. In order to equip their navy with effective torpedoes, numerous advances such as the use of pure oxygen, turbines, and regenerative cooling were experimented with. Torpedo designs were rigorously tested and ascertained to be reliable. The Japanese were also more willing to conduct dangerous experiments and accept the resulting casualties, an attitude that was also reflected in their highly realistic fleet exercises.

Another notable exception to the pre-war neglect of torpedo development was the 45 cm (18 in), 1931-premiered Japanese Type 91 torpedo, one of several aerial torpedoes (Koku Gyorai) developed and brought into service by the Japanese Empire before the war. In December of 1941, the Type 91 was by far the best aerial torpedo in the world. The Type 91 could withstand far higher airdrop speeds than its contemporaries, had an advanced PID controller, and was equipped with breakaway wooden Kyoban underwater stabilizing surfaces which detached after entering the water, making it a formidable anti-ship weapon; Germany considered manufacturing it as the LT 850 after August 1942.

The Royal Navy's 62 cm (24.5 in) oxygen-enriched air torpedo saw service in the two Nelson class battleships, although by World War II, the use of enriched oxygen had been discontinued due to safety concerns. In the final phase of the action against Bismarck, Rodney fired a pair of 62-centimetre (24.5 in) torpedoes from her port-side tube and claimed one hit. According to Ludovic Kennedy, "if true, [this is] the only instance in history of one battleship torpedoing another". The Royal Navy continued the development of oxygen-enriched air torpedoes with the 21-inch Mark VII of the 1920s designed for the County-class cruisers although once again these were converted to run on normal air at the start of World War II. Around this time too the Royal Navy were perfecting the Brotherhood burner cycle engine which offered a performance as good as the oxygen-enriched air engine but without the issues arising from the oxygen equipment and which was first used in the extremely successful and long-lived 21-inch Mark VIII torpedo of 1925. This torpedo served throughout WWII and remained in service until the early 1990s. The improved Mark VIII** was used in two particularly notable incidents: on 6 February 1945, the only intentional wartime sinking of one submarine by another while both were submerged took place when HMS Venturer sank the German submarine U-864 with four Mark VIII** torpedoes, and on 2 May 1982 the Royal Navy submarine HMS Conqueror sank the Argentine cruiser ARA General Belgrano with two Mark VIII Mod 4 torpedoes during the Falklands War..

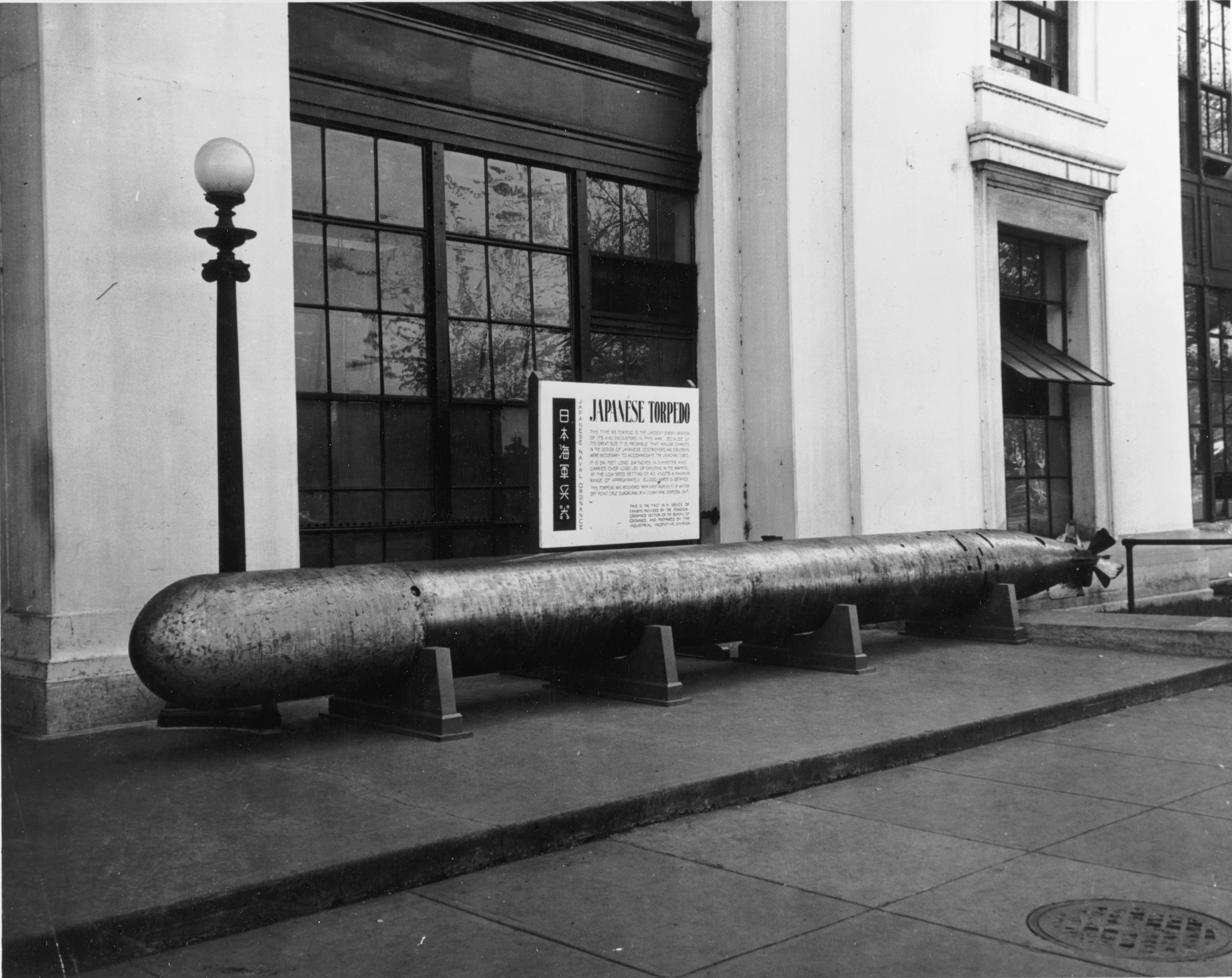
A Japanese Type 93 torpedo – nicknamed "Long Lance" after the war

Many classes of surface ships, submarines, and aircraft were armed with torpedoes. Naval strategy at the time was to use torpedoes, launched from submarines or warships, against enemy warships in a fleet action on the high seas. There were concerns that torpedoes would be ineffective against warships' heavy armor; an answer to this was to detonate torpedoes underneath a ship, badly damaging its keel and the other structural members in the hull, commonly called "breaking its back". This was demonstrated by magnetic influence mines in World War I. The torpedo would be set to run at a depth just beneath the ship, relying on a magnetic exploder to activate at the appropriate time.

Germany, Britain, and the U.S. independently devised ways to do this; German and American torpedoes, however, suffered problems with their depth-keeping mechanisms, coupled with faults in magnetic pistols shared by all designs. Inadequate testing had failed to reveal the effect of the Earth's magnetic field on ships and exploder mechanisms, which resulted in premature detonation. The Kriegsmarine and Royal Navy promptly identified and eliminated the problems. In the United States Navy (USN), there was an extended wrangle over the problems plaguing the Mark 14 torpedo (and its Mark 6 exploder). Cursory trials had allowed bad designs to enter service, and both the Navy Bureau of Ordnance and the United States Congress were too busy protecting their interests to correct the errors. Fully functioning torpedoes only became available to the USN twenty-one months into the Pacific War.

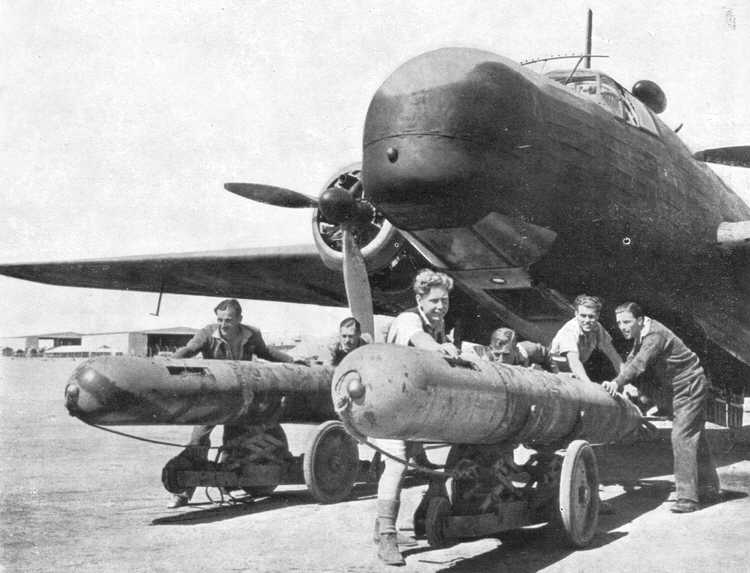
Loading aerial torpedoes into a Type 429 Mark VIII Vickers Wellington maritime patrol aircraft, May 1942.

British submarines used torpedoes to interdict the Axis supply shipping to North Africa, while Fleet Air Arm Swordfish sank three Italian battleships at Taranto by a torpedo and (after a mistaken, but abortive, attack on Sheffield) scored one crucial hit in the hunt for the German battleship Bismarck. Large tonnages of merchant shipping were sunk by submarines with torpedoes in both the Battle of the Atlantic and the Pacific War.

Torpedo boats, such as MTBs, PT boats, or S-boats, enabled the relatively small but fast craft to carry enough firepower, in theory, to destroy a larger ship, though this rarely occurred in practice. The largest warship sunk by torpedoes from small craft in World War II was the British cruiser Manchester, sunk by Italian MAS boats on the night of 12/13 August 1942 during Operation Pedestal. Destroyers of all navies were also armed with torpedoes to attack larger ships. In the Battle off Samar, destroyer torpedoes from the escorts of the American task force "Taffy 3" showed effectiveness at defeating armor. Damage and confusion caused by torpedo attacks were instrumental in beating back a superior Japanese force of battleships and cruisers. In the Battle of the North Cape in December 1943, torpedo hits from British destroyers Savage and Saumarez slowed the German battleship Scharnhorst enough for the British battleship Duke of York to catch and sink her, and in May 1945 the British 26th Destroyer Flotilla (coincidentally led by Saumarez again) ambushed and sank Japanese heavy cruiser Haguro.

As a result of the "Channel Dash" of 1942, when three German warships successfully evaded Royal Navy and Royal Air Force attacks and passed the length of the English Channel from the Atlantic to the North Sea, Britain's Ministry of Aircraft Production commissioned the Helmover torpedo, a five-ton air-launched weapon, but it did not enter service until 1945 and saw no action.

=== Frequency-hopping ===
During World War II, Hedy Lamarr and composer George Antheil developed a radio guidance system for Allied torpedoes; it intended to use frequency-hopping technology to defeat the threat of jamming by the Axis powers. As radio guidance had been abandoned some years earlier, it was not pursued. Although the US Navy never adopted the technology, it did, in the 1960s, investigate various spread-spectrum techniques. Spread-spectrum techniques are incorporated into Bluetooth technology and are similar to methods used in legacy versions of Wi-Fi. This work led to their induction into the National Inventors Hall of Fame in 2014.

=== Post–World War II ===
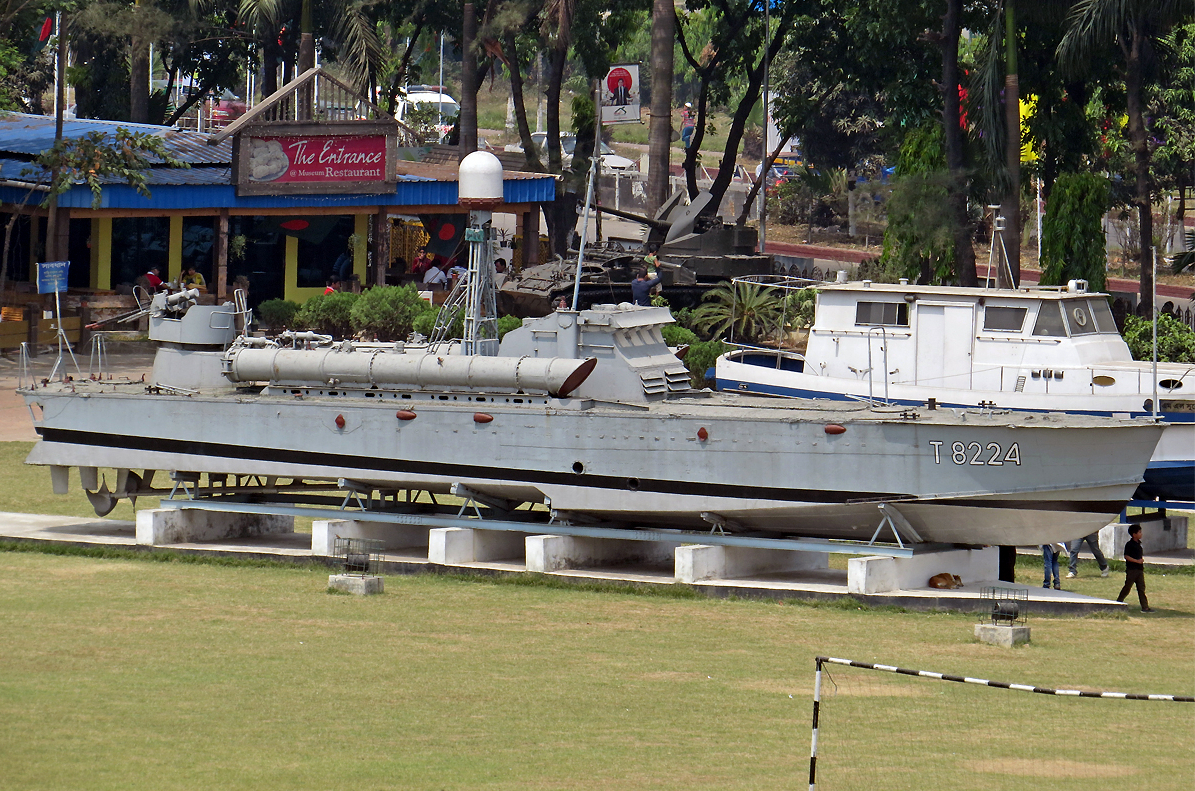
Decommissioned P 4-class torpedo boat of the Bangladesh Navy. Preserved at the Bangladesh Military Museum.

Because of improved submarine strength and speed, torpedoes had to be given improved warheads and better motors. During the Cold War, torpedoes were an important asset with the advent of nuclear-powered submarines, which did not have to surface often, particularly those carrying strategic nuclear missiles.

Several navies have launched torpedo strikes since World War II, including:

- During the Korean War, the United States Navy successfully attacked a dam with air-launched torpedoes.
- Israeli Navy fast attack craft crippled the American electronic intelligence vessel USS Liberty with gunfire and torpedoes during the 1967 Six-Day War, resulting in the loss of 34 crew.
- A Pakistan Navy Daphné-class submarine sank the Indian frigate INS Khukri on 9 December 1971 during the Indo-Pakistani War of 1971, with the loss of over 18 officers and 176 sailors.
- The British Royal Navy nuclear attack submarine HMS Conqueror sank the Argentine Navy light cruiser ARA General Belgrano on 2 May 1982 with two Mark 8 torpedoes during the Falklands War with the loss of 323 lives.
- On 16 June 1982, during the Lebanon War, an unnamed Israeli submarine torpedoed and sank the Lebanese coaster Transit, which was carrying 56 Palestinian refugees to Cyprus, in the belief that the vessel was evacuating anti-Israeli militias. The ship was hit by two torpedoes, managed to run aground but eventually sank. There were 25 dead, including her captain. The Israeli Navy disclosed the incident in November 2018.
- The Croatian Navy disabled the Yugoslav patrol boat PČ-176 Mukos with a torpedo launched by Croatian naval commandos from an improvised device during the Battle of the Dalmatian channels on 14 November 1991, in the course of the Croatian War of Independence. Three members of the crew were killed. The stranded boat was later recovered by Croatian trawlers, salvaged, and put in service with the Croatian Navy as OB-02 Šolta.
- On 26 March 2010, the South Korean Navy corvette ROKS Cheonan was sunk with the loss of 46 personnel. A subsequent investigation concluded that the warship had been sunk by a North Korean torpedo fired by a midget submarine.
- On 4 March 2026, an Iranian frigate IRIS Dena was torpedoed and sunk by an American submarine in the Indian Ocean with the loss of 104 lives. This attack was the first use of a torpedo against an enemy target by a US Navy submarine since 1945.

== Propulsion ==
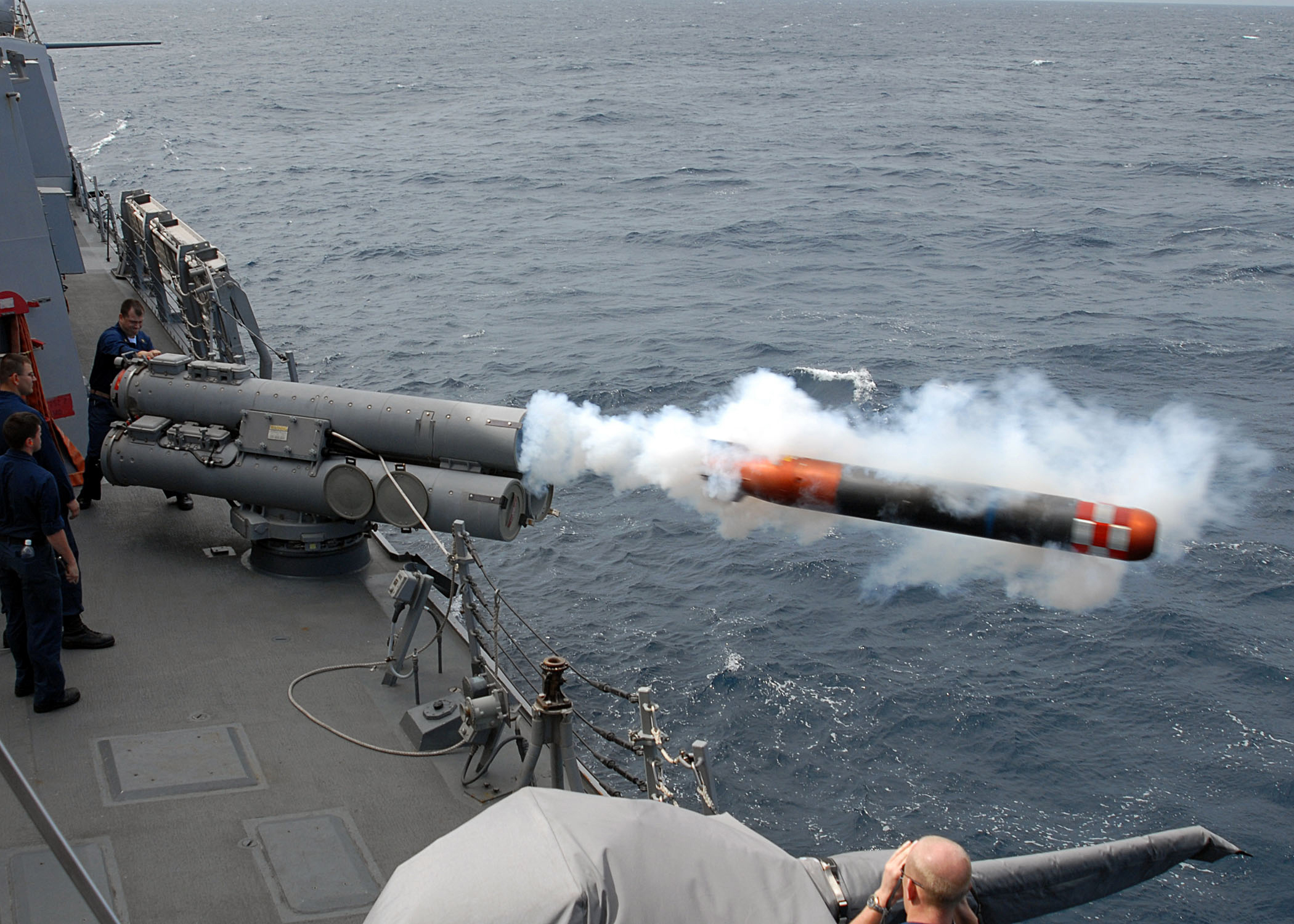
USS Mustin launches a dummy torpedo during exercises.

=== Compressed air ===
The Whitehead torpedo of 1866, the first successful self-propelled torpedo, used compressed air as its energy source. The air was stored at pressures of up to 2.55 MPa (370 psi) and fed to a piston engine that turned a single propeller at about 100 rpm. It could travel about 180 metres (200 yd) at an average speed of 6.5 knots (12.0 km/h). The speed and range of later models were improved by increasing the pressure of the stored air. In 1906 Whitehead built torpedoes that could cover nearly 1,000 metres (1,100 yd) at an average speed of 35 knots (65 km/h).

At higher pressures the adiabatic cooling experienced by the air as it expanded in the engine caused icing problems. This drawback was remedied by heating the air with seawater before it was fed to the engine, which increased engine performance further because the air expanded even more after heating. This was the principle used by the Brotherhood engine.

=== Heated torpedoes ===
Torpedoes propelled by compressed air encountered a significant problem when attempts were made to increase their range and speed. The cold compressed air, upon entering the expansion phase in the piston chambers of the torpedo's engine, caused a rapid drop in temperature. This could freeze the engine solid, by jamming the piston heads inside the cylinders. This led to the idea of injecting a liquid fuel, like kerosene, into the compressed air and igniting it inside a separate expansion chamber. In this manner, the air is heated more and expands even further, and the burned propellant adds more gas to drive the engine. The earliest form was the "Elswick" heater as patented by Armstrong Whitworth in 1904. The device was demonstrated in an 46 cm (18 in) Fiume Mark III torpedo at Bincleaves in 1905 before an audience of British and Japanese experts. The weapon speed was 9 kn (17 km/h) more than for the otherwise-identical unheated version. Construction of such heated torpedoes started the same year by Whitehead's company.

==== Dry heater ====
The earliest production version of the heated torpedo propulsion system, which became known as the Whitehead heater system, mixed the fuel and compressed air after the pressure regulator. Combustion took place in a specialized expansion chamber, with hot combustion products driving the pistons of a reciprocating engine. This had the disadvantage of badly sooting the air vessel with combustion byproducts, and could also engage in a thermal runaway, jamming the engine—not from low temperature as observed with compressed air, but from excess heat. The "dry heater" distinction was only made after wet heater torpedoes were developed, prior to which all heated torpedoes were of the dry heater type—originally simply called "heated".

==== Wet heater ====
A further improvement was the use of water to wash and cool the combustion chamber of the fuel-burning torpedo. Water would be injected into the combustion chamber, at a rate commensurate with the fuel supply rate. This water would flash to steam, with stray condensate carrying the soot combustion byproducts out through the engine. An early example was the wet heater system developed by Lieutenant Sydney Hardcastle at the Royal Gun Factory, in 1908. The compressed air bottle was partially filled with water, with an outlet at the bottom leading into the combustion chamber. This would guarantee that compressed air and water would be injected into the combustion chamber at the same pressure. The system not only solved heating problems so more fuel could be burned but also allowed additional power to be generated by feeding the resulting steam into the engine together with the combustion products. Torpedoes with such a propulsion system became known as wet heaters, while heated torpedoes without steam generation were retrospectively called dry heaters. Most torpedoes used in World War I and World War II were wet heaters.

==== Increased oxidant ====
The amount of fuel that can be burned by a torpedo engine (i.e. wet engine) is limited by the amount of oxygen it can carry. Since compressed air contains only about 21% oxygen, engineers in Japan developed the Type 93 (nicknamed "Long Lance" postwar) for destroyers and cruisers in the 1930s. It used pure compressed oxygen instead of compressed air and had performance unmatched by any contemporary torpedo in service, through the end of World War II. However, oxygen systems posed a danger to ships carrying such torpedoes under normal operation, and more so under attack; Japan lost several cruisers partly due to catastrophic secondary explosions of Type 93s.

During World War II, Germany experimented with hydrogen peroxide for the same purpose.

The British approached the problem of providing additional oxygen for the torpedo engine by the use of oxygen-enriched air rather than pure oxygen: up to 57% instead of the 21% of normal atmospheric compressed air. This significantly increased the range of the torpedo, the 62 cm (24.5 in) Mk 1 having a range of 14,000 metres (15,000 yd) at 35 knots (65 km/h) or 18,000 metres (20,000 yd) at 30 knots (56 km/h) with a 340-kilogram (750 lb) warhead. There was a general nervousness about the oxygen enrichment equipment, known for reasons of secrecy as "No 1 Air Compressor Room" on board ships, and development shifted to the highly efficient Brotherhood Burner Cycle engine that used un-enriched air.

==== Burner cycle engine ====
After the First World War, Peter Brotherhood developed a four-cylinder burner cycle engine which was roughly twice as powerful as the older wet heater engine. It was first used in the British Mk VIII torpedoes, which were still in service in 1982. It used a modified diesel cycle, using a small amount of paraffin to heat the incoming air, which was then compressed and further heated by the piston, and then more fuel was injected. It produced about 240 kilowatts (322 hp) when introduced, but by the end of WWII was at 347 kilowatts (465 hp), and there was a proposal to fuel it with nitric acid, in which it was projected to develop 560 kilowatts (750 hp).

=== Wire driven ===
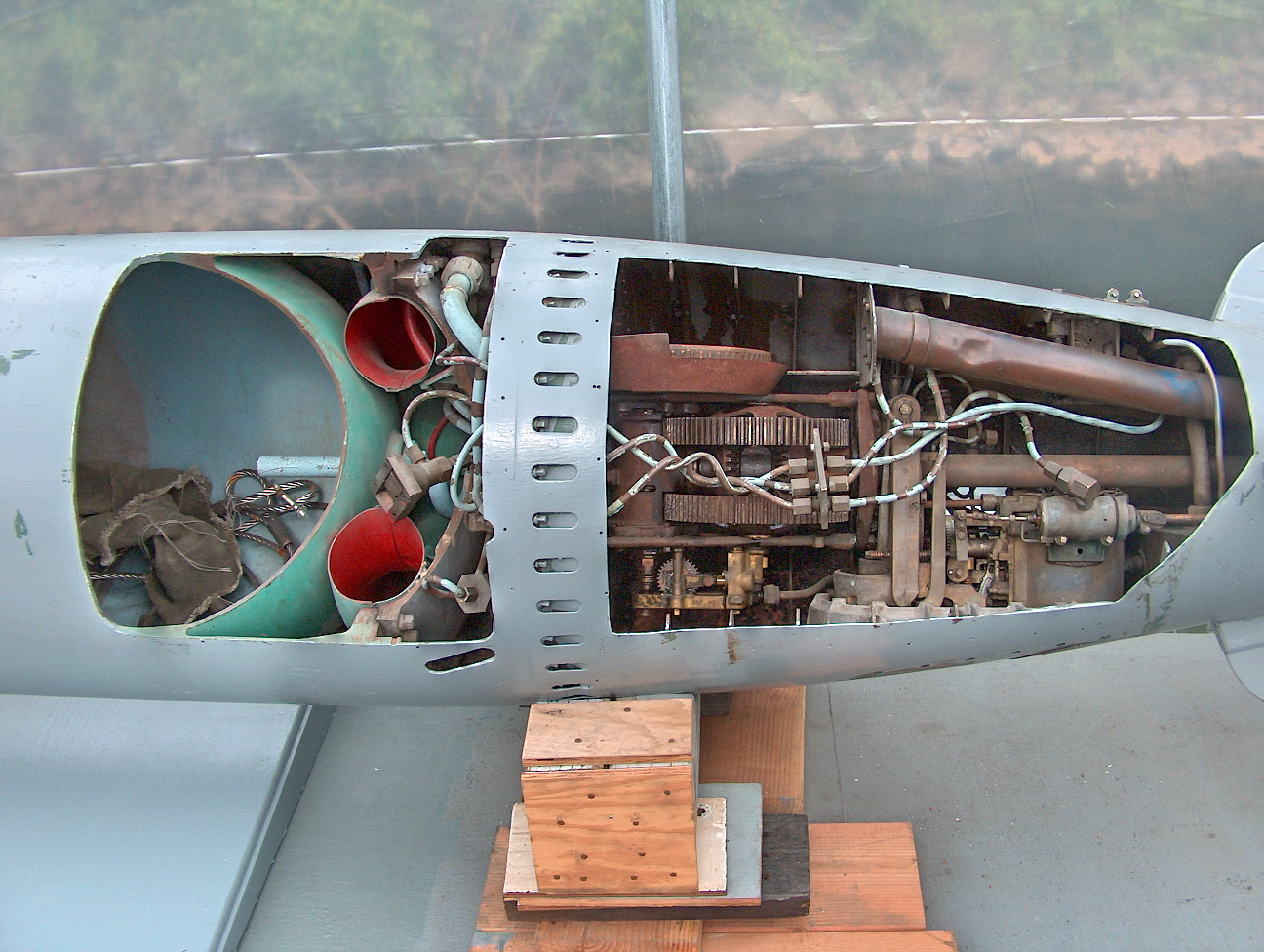
U.S. World War II PT boat torpedo on display

The Brennan torpedo had two wires wound around internal drums joined to the propellers. Shore-based steam winches pulled the wires, which spun the internal drums and drove the propellers. An operator controlled the relative speeds of the winches, providing guidance. Such systems were used for coastal defense of the British homeland and colonies from 1887 to 1903 and were purchased by, and under the control of, the Army as opposed to the Navy. Speed was about 25 knots (46 km/h) for over 2,400 metres (2,600 yd).

=== Flywheel ===
The Howell torpedo used by the US Navy in the late 19th century featured a heavy flywheel that had to be spun up before launch. It was able to travel about 370 metres (400 yd) at 25 knots (46 km/h). The Howell had the advantage of not leaving a trail of bubbles behind it, unlike compressed air torpedoes. This gave the target vessel less chance to detect and evade the torpedo and avoided giving away the attacker's position. Additionally, it ran at a constant depth, unlike Whitehead models.

=== Electric batteries ===
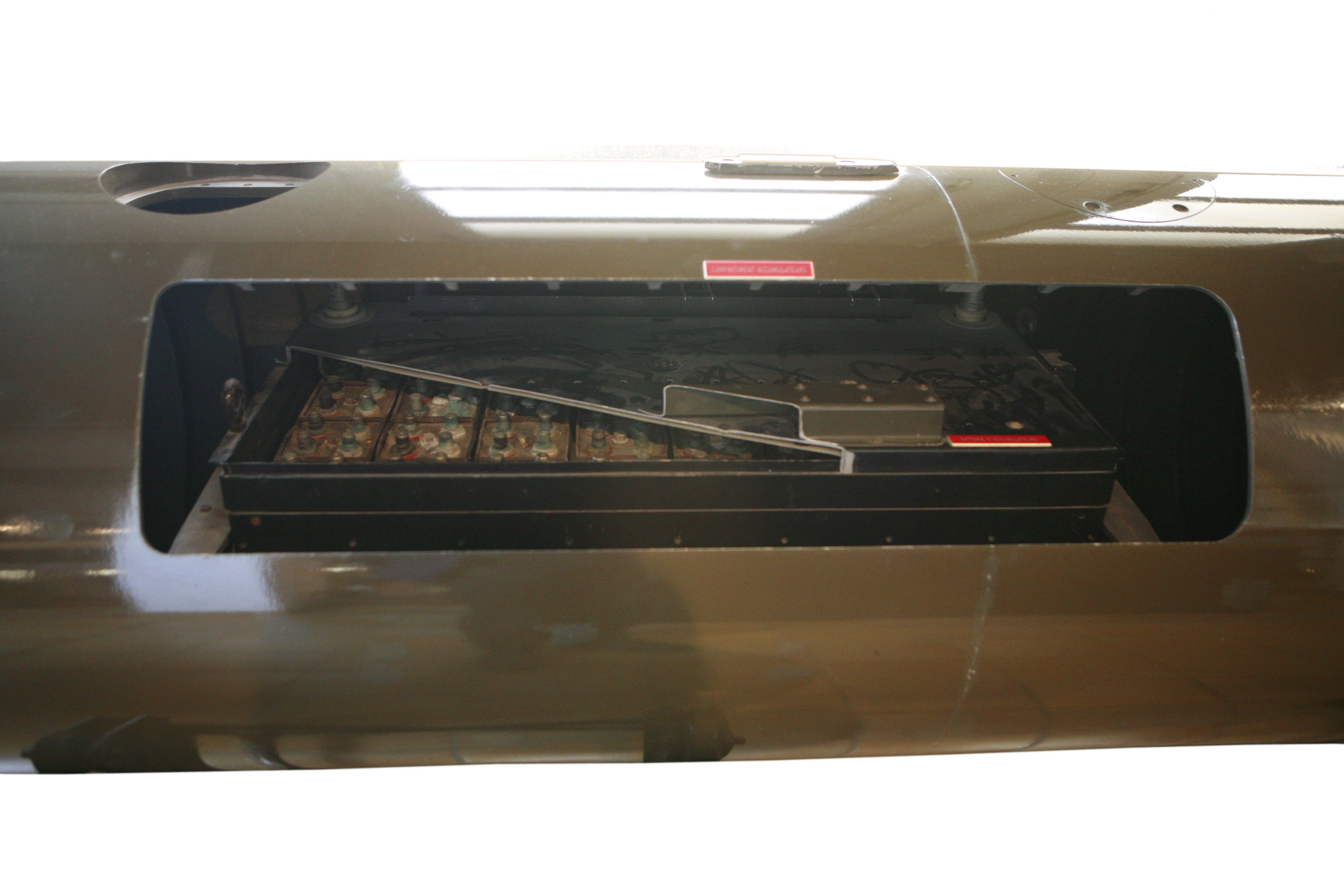
Electric batteries of a French Z13 torpedo

Electric propulsion systems avoided tell-tale bubbles. John Ericsson invented an electrically propelled torpedo in 1873; it was powered by a cable from an external power source, because batteries of the time had insufficient capacity. The Sims-Edison torpedo was similarly powered. The Nordfelt torpedo was also electrically powered and was steered by impulses down a trailing wire.

Germany introduced its first battery-powered torpedo shortly before World War II, the G7e. It was slower and had a shorter range than the conventional G7a, but was wakeless and much cheaper. Its lead-acid rechargeable battery was sensitive to shock, required frequent maintenance before use, and required preheating for best performance. The experimental G7es, an enhancement of the G7e, used primary cells.

The United States had an electric design, the Mark 18, largely copied from the German torpedo (although with improved batteries), as well as FIDO, an air-dropped acoustic homing torpedo for anti-submarine use.

Modern electric torpedoes such as the Mark 24 Tigerfish, the Black Shark or DM2 series commonly use silver oxide batteries that need no maintenance, so torpedoes can be stored for years without losing performance.

=== Rockets ===
Several experimental rocket-propelled torpedoes were tried soon after Whitehead's invention but were not successful. Rocket propulsion has been implemented successfully by the Soviet Union, for example in the VA-111 Shkval, and has been recently revived in Russian and German torpedoes, as it is especially suitable for supercavitating devices.

=== Modern energy sources ===
Modern torpedoes use a variety of propellants, including electric batteries (as with the French F21 torpedo or Italian Black Shark), monopropellants (e.g., Otto fuel II as with the US Mark 48 torpedo), and bipropellants (e.g., hydrogen peroxide plus kerosene as with the Swedish Torped 62, sulfur hexafluoride plus lithium as with the US Mark 50 torpedo, or Otto fuel II plus hydroxyl ammonium perchlorate as with the British Spearfish torpedo).

=== Propeller ===
The first of Whitehead's torpedoes had a single propeller and needed a large vane to stop it spinning about its longitudinal axis. Not long afterward the idea of contra-rotating propellers was introduced, to avoid the need for the vane. The three-bladed propeller came in 1893 and the four-bladed one in 1897. To minimize noise, today's torpedoes often use pump-jets.

=== Supercavitation ===
Some torpedoes—like the Russian VA-111 Shkval, Iranian Hoot, and German Unterwasserlaufkörper/ Barracuda—use supercavitation to increase speed to over 200 knots (370 km/h). Torpedoes that do not use supercavitation, such as the American Mark 48 and British Spearfish, are limited to under 100 kn (190 km/h), though manufacturers and the military do not always release exact figures.

== Guidance ==
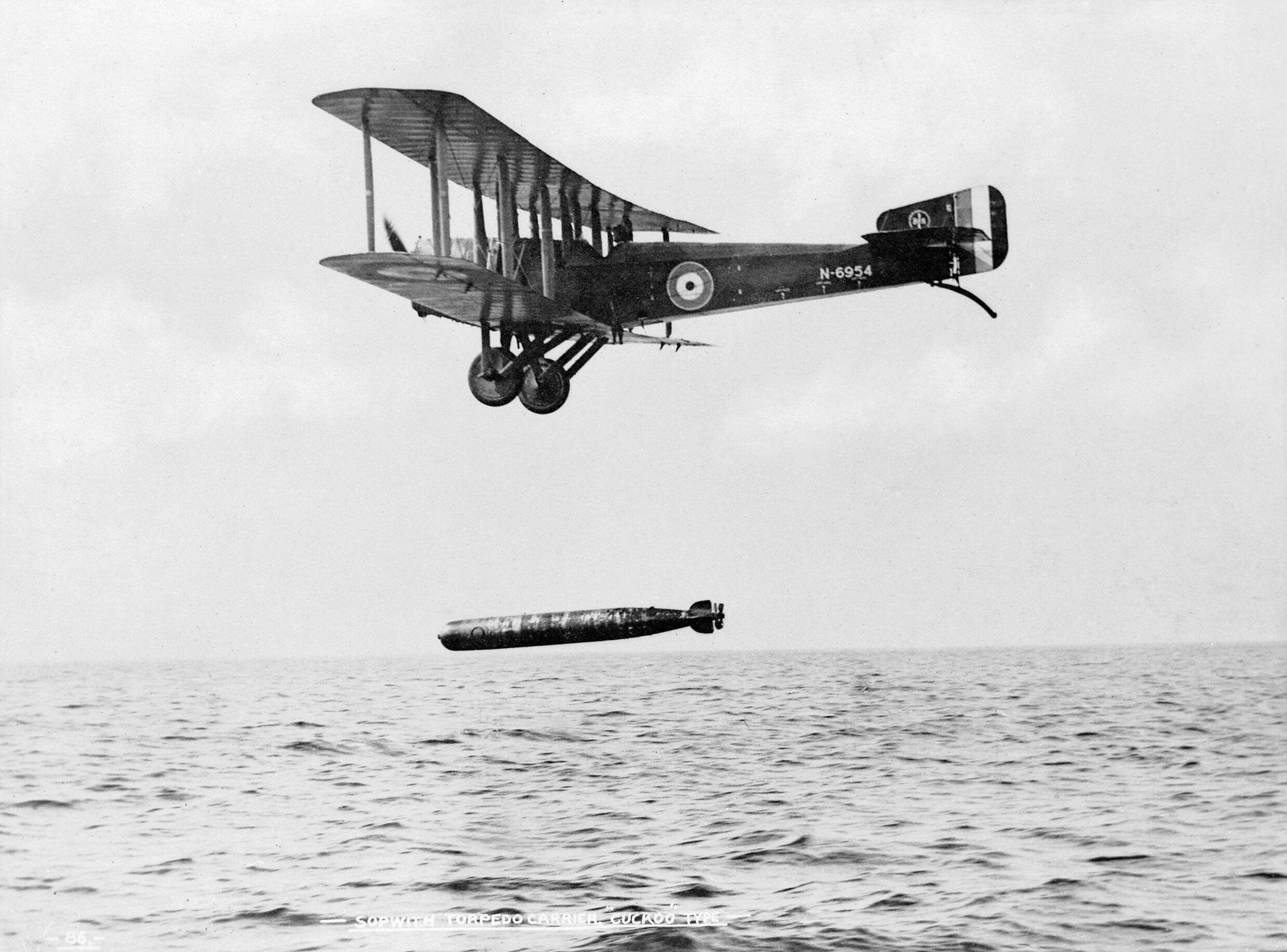
A torpedo dropped from a Sopwith Cuckoo during World War I

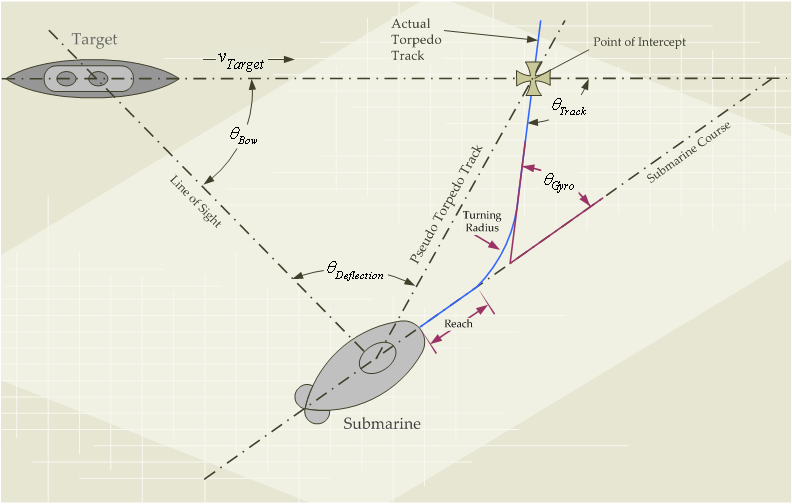
Illustration of General Torpedo Fire Control Problem

Torpedoes may be aimed at the target and fired unguided, similarly to a traditional artillery shell, or they may be guided onto the target. They may be guided autonomously towards the target by some procedure, such as sound (homing), or by the operator, typically via commands sent over a signal-carrying cable (wire guidance).

=== Unguided ===
The Victorian-era Brennan torpedo could be steered onto its target by varying the relative speeds of its propulsion cables. However, the Brennan required a substantial infrastructure and was not suitable for shipboard use. Therefore, for the first part of its history, the torpedo was guided only in the sense that its course could be regulated to achieve an intended impact depth (because of the sine-wave running path of the Whitehead, this was a hit or miss proposition, even when everything worked correctly) and, through gyroscopes, a straight course. With such torpedoes the method of attack in small torpedo boats, torpedo bombers, and small submarines was to steer a predictable collision course abeam to the target and release the torpedo at the last minute, then veer away, all the time subject to defensive fire.

In larger ships and submarines, fire-control calculators gave a wider engagement envelope. Originally, plotting tables (in large ships), combined with specialized slide rules (known in U.S. service as the "banjo" and "Is/Was"), reconciled the speed, distance, and course of a target with the firing ship's speed and course, together with the performance of its torpedoes, to provide a firing solution. By the Second World War, all sides had developed automatic electro-mechanical calculators, exemplified by the U.S. Navy's Torpedo Data Computer. Submarine commanders were still expected to be able to calculate a firing solution by hand as a backup against mechanical failure, and because many submarines existed at the start of the war were not equipped with a TDC; most could keep the "picture" in their heads and do much of the calculations (simple trigonometry) mentally, from extensive training.

Against high-value targets and multiple targets, submarines would launch a spread of torpedoes, to increase the probability of success. Similarly, squadrons of torpedo boats and torpedo bombers would attack together, creating a "fan" of torpedoes across the target's course. Faced with such an attack, the prudent thing for a target to do was to turn to parallel the course of the incoming torpedo and steam away from the torpedoes and the firer, allowing the relatively short-range torpedoes to use up their fuel. An alternative was to "comb the tracks", turning to parallel the incoming torpedo's course, but turning towards the torpedoes. The intention of such a tactic was still to minimize the size of the target offered to the torpedoes, but at the same time be able to aggressively engage the firer. This was the tactic advocated by critics of Jellicoe's actions at Jutland, his caution at turning away from the torpedoes being seen as the reason the Germans escaped.

The use of multiple torpedoes to engage single targets depletes torpedo supplies and greatly reduces a submarine's combat endurance. Endurance can be improved by ensuring that a target can be effectively engaged by a single torpedo, which gave rise to the guided torpedo.

=== Pattern running ===
The functional concept of torpedoes running a ladder search pattern, launched by two submarines at a moving convoy.

During the Second World War, the Germans introduced programmable pattern-running torpedoes, which would run a predetermined pattern until they either ran out of fuel or hit something. These weapons would generally engage in a ladder search pattern, and were intended for engaging convoys of vessels, commonly encountered in the Atlantic theater. The use of pattern-running torpedoes allowed a wolfpack of U-boats to lob large numbers of shots in the general area of a moving convoy, without concern that two different U-boats may be targeting the same vessel.

The earlier version of the weapon, FaT (Flächenabsuchender - "planar seeker"), ran out after launch in a straight line, and then weaved backward and forwards parallel to that initial course, whilst the more advanced LuT (Lageunabhängiger - "position-independent") could transit to a preprogrammed gyrocompass angle after reaching a set distance after launch, and then enter a more complex weaving pattern.

Germany also used the Italian LT 350 aerial torpedo for ASW. The weapon lacked an acoustic seeker head, but it would be dropped in clusters over the approximate location of a lurking enemy submarine, and would thereafter engage in a chaotic movement pattern, in order to hit the target by random chance.

A somewhat similar concept for a chaotic underwater pattern search was experimented with by Japan during the Second World War with their Kūrai No.6 and No.7 circling ASW bomb-torpedoes. These weapons did not possess homing capabilities, nor a propulsion system; the design resembled a dart, and would glide at high speed when launched. The functional concept envisioned multiple such weapons launched directly by an aircraft at a surfaced submarine, or at the approximate location of a submerged one. After splashdown, the weapons would move in a spiral pattern as they sank, their forward movement being enacted by the Earth's gravity.

Acoustic homing torpedoes usually possess the capability to engage in simple search patterns at the launching entity's discretion; the most common of these are the snake (weave left and right while moving forward, to achieve a wider forward-facing detection cone) and the circle (continuously travel in a circle, for omnidirectional detection around the epicenter of the circle) search patterns. A good example of a weapon possessing both of these search patterns is the Mark 46 lightweight torpedo, used in large numbers worldwide.

=== Radio and wire guidance ===
Though Luppis' original design had been rope-guided, and numerous early examples of torpedoes possessed MCLOS wire guidance and radio guidance, wire-guided torpedoes did not become common until the 1960s.

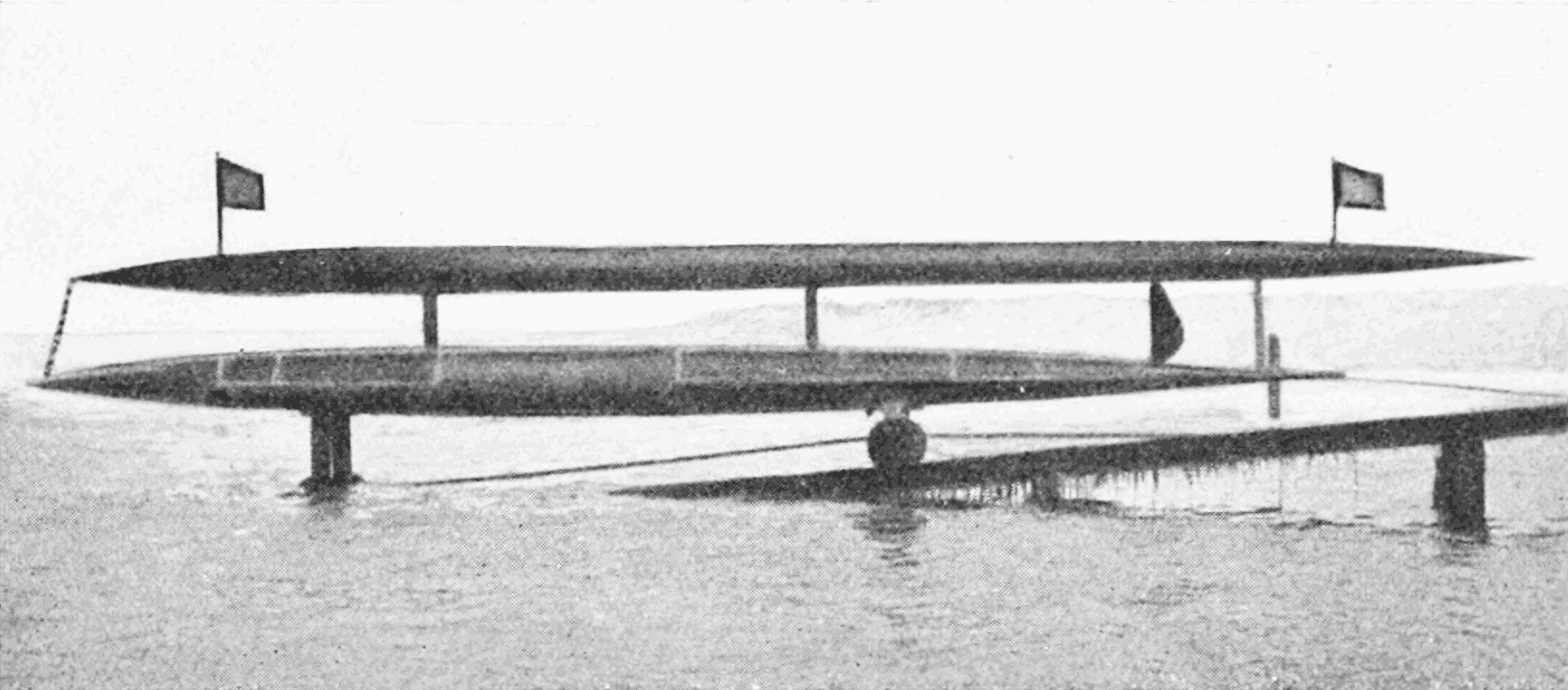
A Patrick wire-guided torpedo in launch configuration, circa 1899.

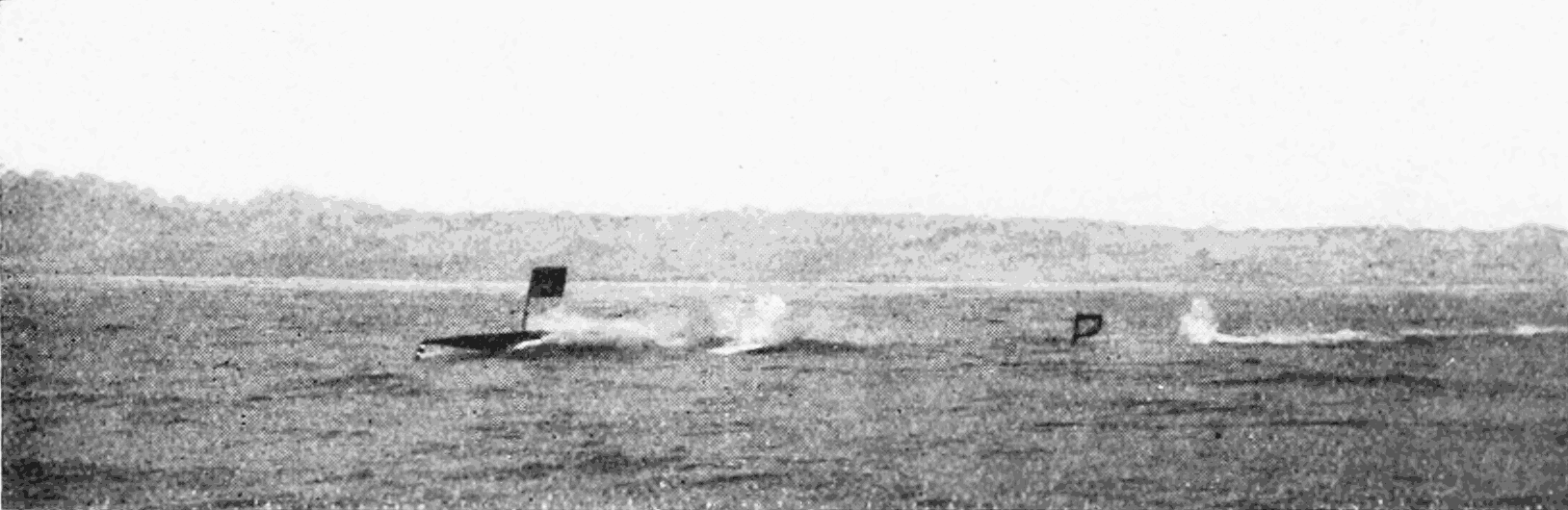
A Patrick wire-guided torpedo moving at 23 knots. The flags were used for line-of-sight control.

One of the earliest examples of an electrical wire-guided torpedo was the Lay torpedo, designed by John Louis Lay between 1867 and 1872. It would eventually be developed into the Patrick torpedo circa 1890, which was capable of speeds up to 23 kn (43 km/h). Prototyped after 1888, the Patrick torpedo was an enormous weapon, with a length of over 42 ft (13 m) and a 24 in (61 cm) diameter of the main body. It carried a warhead containing 91 kg (200 lb) of explosive filler and overall weighed 2,700 kg (6,000 lb). Propulsion was enacted by a six-cylinder piston engine powered by a carbonic acid reaction with water, the same propulsion system employed by the earlier Lay-Haight weapon. At a speed of 21 kn (39 km/h), its endurance was 2,000 yd (1,800 m). The payload size, and both the guidance and the propulsion systems were advances over those of its conventional contemporaries: Whitehead and Schwartzkopff torpedoes of the 1880s were much smaller, did not possess remote guidance, and exclusively used compressed air propulsion.

The Brennan torpedo of 1877 was a wire-guided weapon which had an all-mechanical control scheme, and also used the control wires as a source of propulsive energy. By selectively putting more or less tension on the control wires as they were payed out, the weapon could be steered left and right. Line-of-sight control was accomplished by observing a tracking mast which projected above the water from the weapon's body.

In 1898, Nikola Tesla demonstrated a radio-controlled boat, which he referred to as a "teleautomaton". The device utilized coherer-based circuitry for radio communications and control. He proposed designing radio-controlled guided torpedoes for the US navy which functioned on the same principle.

One of the most sophisticated early examples of a radio-controlled torpedo was the Sims-Edison torpedo (circa 1890), later known as the Sims-Shoemaker torpedo (after 1902). Developed by Winfield Scott Sims in collaboration with Thomas Edison, the weapon existed in three versions, with the first two (patented in 1885 and 1891) being wire-guided and additionally powered remotely by an umbilical cable. The 1885 version had a speed of 11 kn (20 km/h), and the 1891 version improved this to 21 kn (39 km/h). Maximal range was 3,500 yd (3,200 m), limited by the length of the umbilical cable, and endurance was unlimited. The weapon was also equipped with an electrical detonator, which was touted as a safety feature: contemporary Whitehead and Howell torpedoes employed a percussion inertial fuze. The final 1902 version of the weapon carried a 230 kg (500 lb) nitrogelatin warhead and was capable of a speed of 20 kn (37 km/h). Control signals used code sequences transmitted via radio, in a manner similar to a teletype; aside from steering, the weapon could also be remotely armed and detonated, sped up or slowed down, and halted entirely at the operator's discretion. The weapon was effectively impossible to hijack even if an identical command console were possessed by the adversary, and the brevity of command signals would have also enormously complicated radio signal detection and jamming. The Sims-Edison torpedo was employed on the Brazilian auxiliary cruiser Andrada in 1893-1894 during the Federalist Revolution; however, it was never used, due to an absence of qualified personnel.

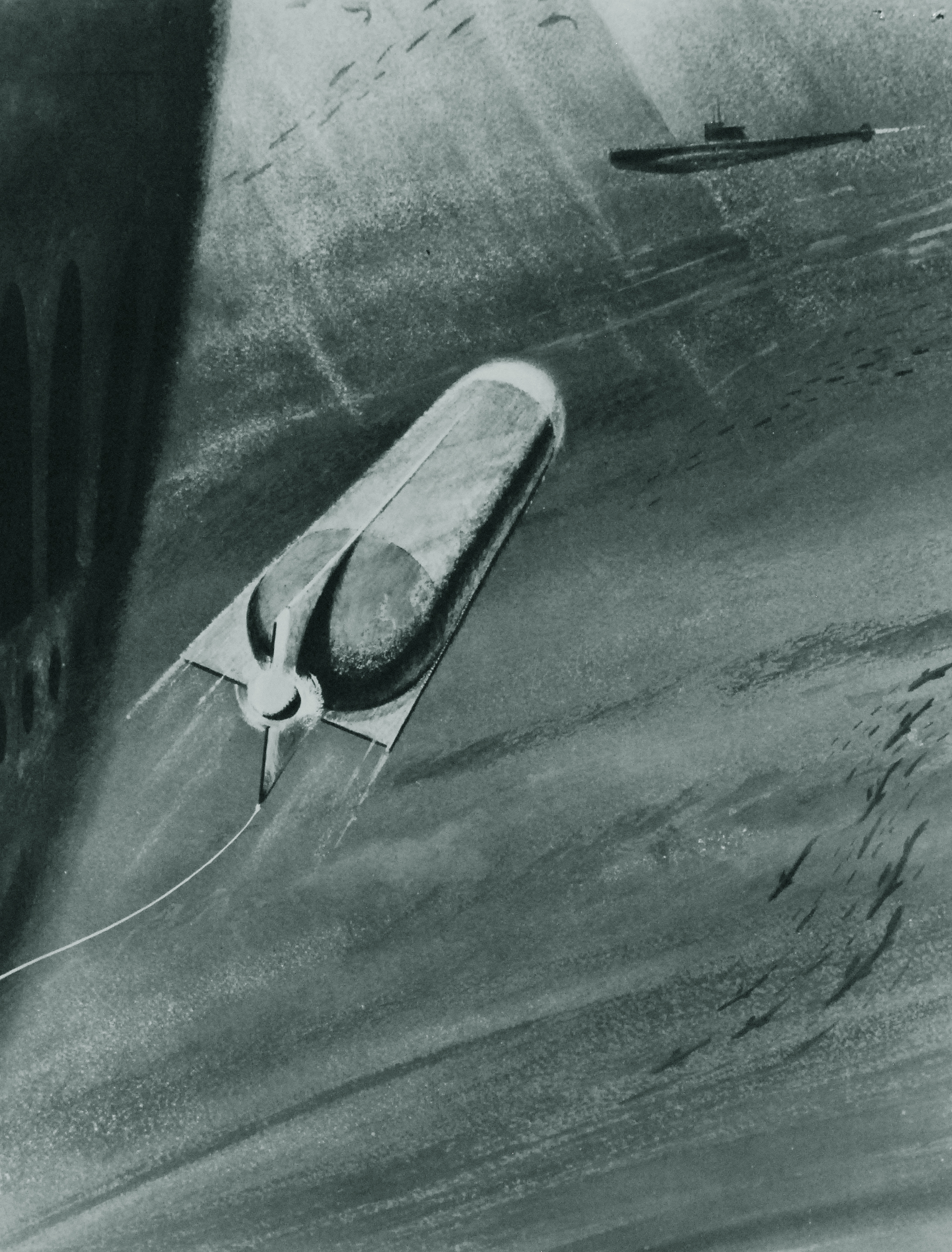
Artist's impression of a USN Mark 39 wire-guided torpedo approaching a hostile submarine.

During the First World War, the U.S. Navy evaluated a radio controlled torpedo launched from a surface ship, called the Hammond torpedo. A later version tested in the 1930s was claimed to have an effective range of 6 nmi (11 km). Designed by John Hays Hammond after 1911, the 40 ft (12 m) long weapon carried a warhead of 230 kg (500 lb) of guncotton, used a gasoline piston engine for propulsion and had an estimated speed of as much as 28 kn (52 km/h), with an endurance of as much as 7 nmi (13 km). Radio guidance used analog signals theoretically susceptible to interception and spoofing by the enemy, but this consequently made the weapon cheaper and easier to control, and its speed was posited as sufficient to offset this disadvantage.

The first major example of a wire-guided torpedo which was used against live targets in warfare was the German G7ef "Spinne", introduced in 1944, which was a G7e variant equipped with an electronic guidance wire, controlled by means of acoustic beam riding by the launching entity. Originally intended for use by land emplacements for strait defense, later examples were deployed by submarines.

Another example of a guided torpedo during the Second World War was the Helmover torpedo, which was a colossal aerial torpedo with an overall mass of 5,200 kg (11,500 lb), carrying a warhead filled with 1,000 kg (2,200 lb) of RDX explosive. The Helmover torpedo possessed a vertical mast which projected above the water and shone infrared lights towards the guiding aircraft to indicate its location and orientation, in a manner similar to a PAPI array. Guidance signals to the torpedo were transmitted via radio.

The first truly modern electronically wire-guided torpedo was the USN Mark 39, introduced in 1946. It possessed three-dimensional acoustic homing and used a control wire for mid-course guidance. In 1956, the Mark 39 would be superseded by the Mark 37, which served as a mainstay ASW weapon during the 1960s.

Another advancement in the field of teleoperated torpedoes was the Royal Navy Mark 23 Grog, first available in 1959, an ASW weapon which established a direct audio signal link between the hydrophones of the weapon's seeker head and the command console onboard the launching submarine. A human operator would directly listen to the sounds heard by the torpedo, allowing for sophisticated discrimination of acoustic decoys and target recognition.

Modern torpedoes use an umbilical wire, which nowadays allows the computer processing power of the submarine or ship to be used. Torpedoes such as the USN Mark 48 can operate in a variety of modes, increasing tactical flexibility.

=== Homing ===
Homing "fire and forget" torpedoes can use passive or active guidance or a combination of both. Passive acoustic torpedoes home in on emissions from a target. Active acoustic torpedoes home in on the reflection of a signal, or "ping", from the torpedo or its parent vehicle; this has the disadvantage of giving away the presence of the torpedo. In semi-active mode, a torpedo can be fired to the last known position or calculated position of a target, which is then acoustically illuminated ("pinged") once the torpedo is within attack range.

Later in the Second World War, torpedoes were given acoustic (homing) guidance systems, with the American Mark 24 mine and Mark 27 torpedo and the German G7es torpedo. Pattern-following and wake-homing torpedoes were also developed. Acoustic homing formed the basis for torpedo guidance after the Second World War.

The homing systems for torpedoes are generally acoustic, though there have been other target sensor types used. A ship's acoustic signature is not the only emission a torpedo can home in on; to engage U.S. supercarriers, the Soviet Union developed the 53–65 wake-homing torpedo. As standard acoustic lures cannot distract a wake-homing torpedo, the US Navy has installed the Surface Ship Torpedo Defense on aircraft carriers that use a Countermeasure Anti-Torpedo to home in on and destroy the attacking torpedo.

== Warhead and fuzing ==
The warhead is generally some form of aluminized explosive, because the sustained explosive pulse produced by the powdered aluminum is particularly destructive against underwater targets. Torpex was popular until the 1950s, but has been superseded by PBX compositions. Nuclear torpedoes have also been developed, such as the Mark 45 torpedo. In lightweight antisubmarine torpedoes designed to penetrate submarine hulls, a shaped charge can be used. Detonation can be triggered by direct contact with the target or by a proximity fuze incorporating sonar and/or magnetic sensors.

=== Contact detonation ===
When a torpedo with a contact fuze strikes the side of the target hull, the resulting explosion creates a bubble of expanding gas, the walls of which move faster than the speed of sound in water, thus creating a shock wave. The side of the bubble which is against the hull rips away the external plating, creating a large breach. The bubble then collapses in on itself, forcing a high-speed stream of water into the breach which can destroy bulkheads and machinery in its path.

=== Proximity detonation ===
A torpedo fitted with a proximity fuze can be detonated directly under the keel of a target ship. The explosion creates a gas bubble which may damage the keel or underside plating of the target. However, the most destructive part of the explosion is the upthrust of the gas bubble, which will bodily lift the hull in the water. The structure of the hull is designed to resist downward rather than upward pressure, causing severe strain in this phase of the explosion. When the gas bubble collapses, the hull will tend to fall into the void in the water, creating a sagging effect. Finally, the weakened hull will be hit by the uprush of water caused by the collapsing gas bubble, causing structural failure. On vessels up to the size of a modern frigate, this can result in the ship breaking in two and sinking. This effect is likely to prove less catastrophic on a much larger hull, for instance, that of an aircraft carrier.

=== Damage ===
The damage that may be caused by a torpedo depends on the "shock factor value", a combination of the initial strength of the explosion and the distance between the target and the detonation. For ship hull plating, the term "hull shock factor" (HSF) is used, while keel damage is termed "keel shock factor" (KSF). If the explosion is directly underneath the keel, then HSF is equal to KSF, but explosions that are not directly underneath the ship will have a lower value of KSF.

==== Direct damage ====
Usually only created by contact detonation, direct damage is a hole blown in the ship. Among the crew, fragmentation wounds are the most common form of injury. Flooding typically occurs in one or two main watertight compartments, which can sink smaller ships or disable larger ones.

==== Bubble-jet effect ====
The bubble-jet effect occurs when a mine or torpedo detonates in the water a short distance away from the targeted ship. The explosion creates a bubble in the water, and due to the pressure difference, the bubble will collapse from the bottom. The bubble is buoyant, and so it rises towards the surface. If the bubble reaches the surface as it collapses, it can create a pillar of water that can go over a hundred meters into the air (a "columnar plume"). If conditions are right and the bubble collapses onto the ship's hull, the damage to the ship can be extremely serious; the collapsing bubble forms a high-energy jet that can break a meter-wide hole straight through the ship, flooding one or more compartments, and is capable of breaking smaller ships apart. The crew in the areas hit by the pillar are usually killed instantly. Other damage is usually limited.

The Baengnyeong incident, in which ROKS Cheonan broke in half and sank off the coast South Korea in 2010, was caused by the bubble-jet effect, according to an international investigation.

==== Shock effect ====
If the torpedo detonates at a distance from the ship, and especially under the keel, the change in water pressure causes the ship to resonate. This is frequently the most deadly type of explosion if it is strong enough. The whole ship is dangerously shaken and everything on board is tossed around. Engines rip from their beds, cables from their holders, etc. A badly shaken ship usually sinks quickly, with hundreds or even thousands of small leaks all over the ship and no way to power the pumps. The crew fares no better, as the violent shaking also tosses them around. This shaking is powerful enough to cause disabling injury to knees and other joints in the body, particularly if the affected person stands on surfaces connected directly to the hull (such as steel decks).

The resulting gas cavitation and shock-front-differential over the width of the human body is sufficient to stun or kill divers.

== Control surfaces and hydrodynamics ==
Control surfaces are essential for a torpedo to maintain its course and depth. A homing torpedo also needs to be able to outmaneuver a target. Good hydrodynamics are needed for it to attain high speed efficiently and also to give a long range, since the torpedo has limited stored energy.

== Launch platforms and launchers ==
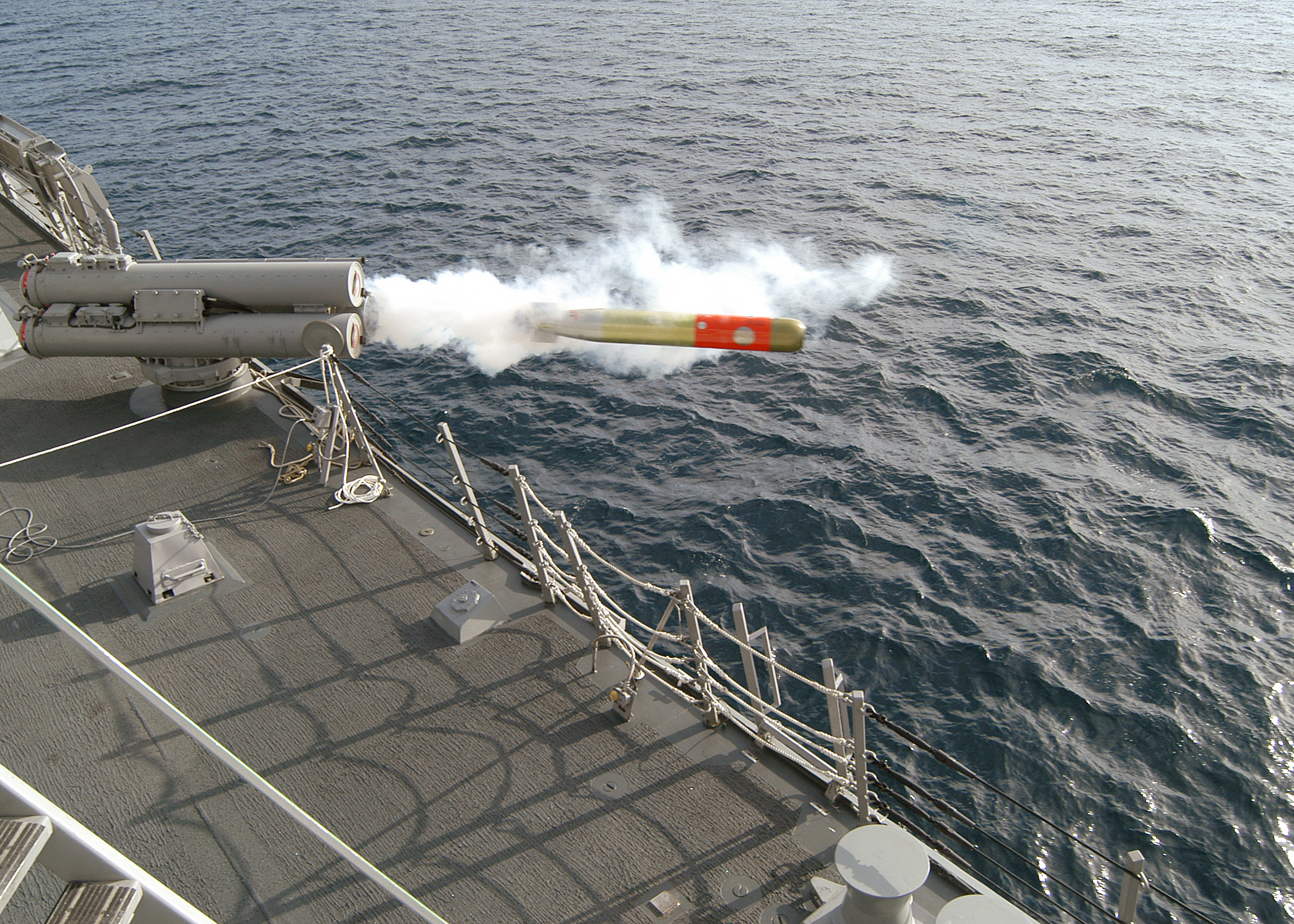
A Mark 32 Mod 15 Surface Vessel Torpedo Tube (SVTT) fires a Mark 46 Mod 5 lightweight torpedo

Torpedoes may be launched from submarines, surface ships, helicopters, and fixed-wing aircraft, unmanned naval mines, and naval fortresses. They are also used in conjunction with other weapons; for example, the Mark 46 torpedo used by the United States is the warhead section of the ASROC, a kind of anti-submarine missile; the CAPTOR mine (CAPsulated TORpedo) is a submerged sensor platform which releases a torpedo when a hostile contact is detected.

=== Ships ===
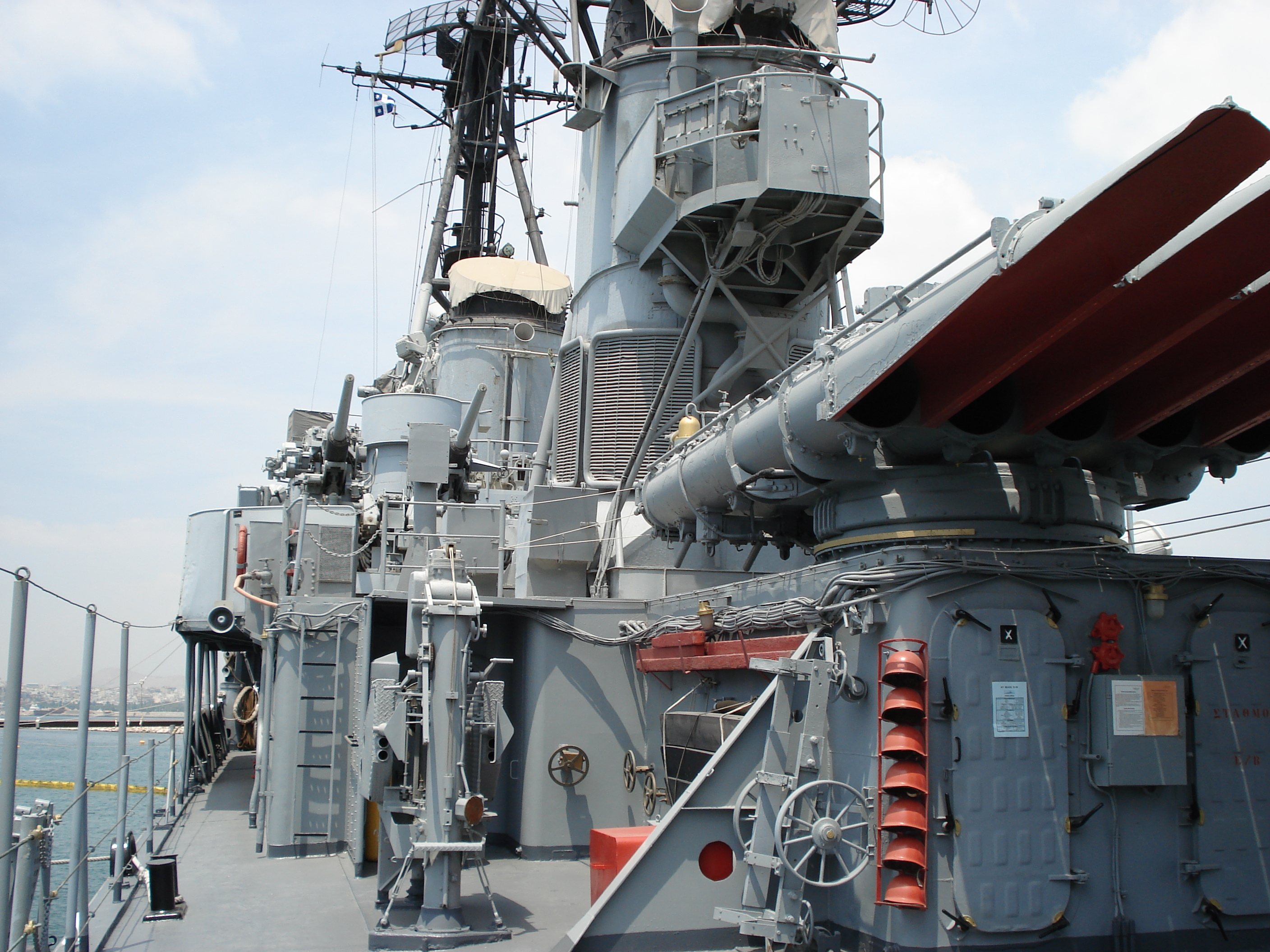
Amidships quintuple mounting for 21 in (53 cm) torpedoes aboard the World War II era destroyer USS Charrette

Originally, Whitehead torpedoes were intended for launch underwater and the firm was upset when they found out the British were launching them above water, as they considered their torpedoes too delicate for this. However, the torpedoes survived. The launch tubes could be fitted in a ship's bow, which weakened it for ramming, or on the broadside; this introduced problems because of water flow twisting the torpedo, so guide rails and sleeves were used to prevent it. The torpedoes were originally ejected from the tubes by compressed air, but later, slow-burning gunpowder was used. Torpedo boats originally used a frame that dropped the torpedo into the sea. Royal Navy Coastal Motor Boats of World War I used a rear-facing trough and a cordite ram to push the torpedoes into the water tail-first; they then had to move rapidly out of the way to avoid being hit by their torpedo.

Developed in the run-up to the first world war, multiple-tube mounts (initially twin, later triple, and in the second world war up to quintuple in some ships) for 53-to-61 cm (21-to-24 in) torpedoes in rotating turntable mounts appeared. Destroyers could be found with two or three of these mounts with between five and twelve tubes in total. The Japanese went one better, covering their tube mounts with splinter protection and adding reloading gear (both unlike any other navy in the world), making them true turrets and increasing the broadside without adding tubes and top hamper (as the quadruple and quintuple mounts did). Considering that their Type 93s were very effective weapons, the IJN equipped their cruisers with torpedoes. The Germans also equipped their capital ships with torpedoes.

Smaller vessels such as PT boats carried their torpedoes in fixed deck-mounted tubes using compressed air. These were either aligned to fire forward or at an offset angle from the centerline.

Later, lightweight mounts for 32.4-centimetre (12.75 in) homing torpedoes were developed for anti-submarine use consisting of triple launch tubes used on the decks of ships. These were the 1960 Mk 32 torpedo launcher in the US and part of STWS (Shipborne Torpedo Weapon System) in the UK. Later, a below-decks launcher was used by the RN. This basic launch system continues to be used today with improved torpedoes and fire control systems.

=== Submarines ===
Modern submarines use either swim-out systems or a pulse of water to discharge the torpedo from the tube, both of which have the advantage of being significantly quieter than previous systems, helping avoid detection of the firing from passive sonar. Earlier designs used a pulse of compressed air or a hydraulic ram.

Early submarines, when they carried torpedoes, were fitted with a variety of torpedo launching mechanisms in a range of locations: on the deck, in the bow or stern, amidships, with some launch mechanisms permitting the torpedo to be aimed over a wide arc. By World War II, designs favored multiple bow tubes and fewer or no stern tubes. Modern submarine bows are usually occupied by a large sonar array, necessitating midships tubes angled outward, while stern tubes have largely disappeared. The first French and Russian submarines carried their torpedoes externally in Drzewiecki drop collars. These were cheaper than tubes but less reliable. Both the United Kingdom and the United States experimented with external tubes in World War II. External tubes offered a cheap and easy way of increasing torpedo capacity without radical redesign, something neither had time or resources to do before nor early in, the war. British T-class submarines carried up to 13 torpedo tubes, up to 5 of them external. America's use was mainly limited to earlier Porpoise-, Salmon-, and Sargo-class boats. Until the appearance of the Tambor class, most American submarines only carried 4 bow and either 2 or 4 stern tubes, something many American submarine officers felt provided inadequate firepower. This problem was compounded by the notorious unreliability of the Mark 14 torpedo.

Late in World War II, the U.S. adopted a 41-centimetre (16 in) homing torpedo (known as "Cutie") for use against escorts. It was basically a modified Mark 24 Mine with wooden rails to allow firing from a 53-centimetre (21 in) torpedo tube.

=== Air launch ===
Aerial torpedoes may be carried by fixed-wing aircraft, helicopters, or missiles. They are launched from the first two at prescribed speeds and altitudes, dropped from bomb-bays or underwing hardpoints.

== Handling equipment ==
Although lightweight torpedoes are fairly easily handled, the transport and handling of heavyweight torpedoes is difficult, especially in the tight spaces in a submarine. After the Second World War, some Type XXI submarines were obtained from Germany by the United States and Britain. One of the main novel developments seen was a mechanical handling system for torpedoes. Such systems were widely adopted as a result of this discovery.

== Classes and diameters ==
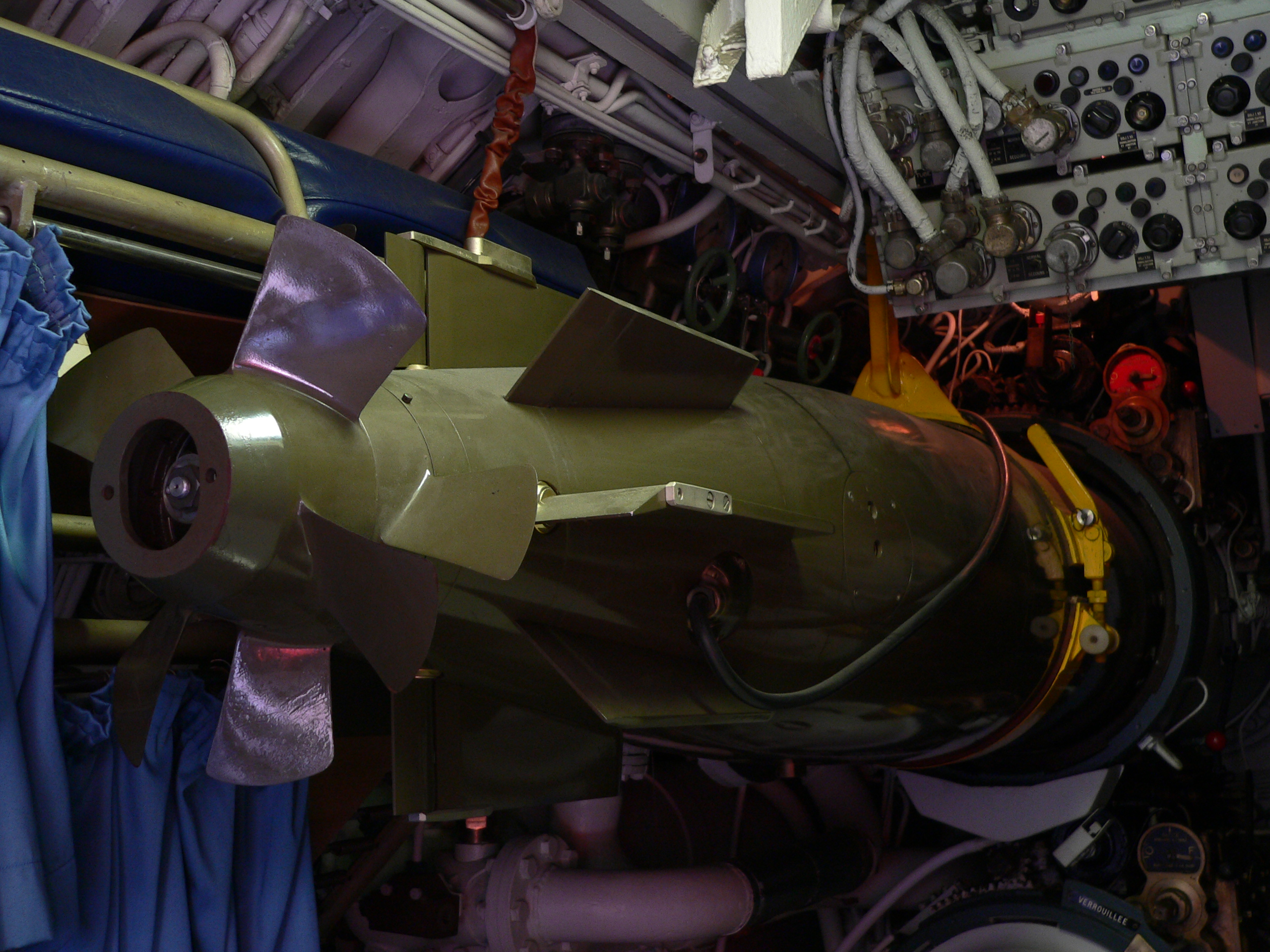
Torpedo tube aboard the French submarine Argonaute

Torpedoes are launched in several ways:

- From a torpedo tube mounted either in a trainable deck mount (common in destroyers), or fixed above or below the waterline of a surface vessel (as in cruisers, battleships, and armed merchant cruisers) or submarine.
- Early submarines and some torpedo boats (such as the U.S. World War II PT boats, which used the Mark 13 aircraft torpedo) used deck-mounted "drop collars", which simply relied on gravity.
- From shackles aboard low-flying aircraft or helicopters.
- As the final stage of a compound rocket- or ramjet-powered munition (sometimes called an assisted torpedo).

Many navies have two weights of torpedoes:

- A light torpedo used primarily as a close attack weapon, particularly by aircraft. The 32.4 cm (12.75 in) caliber has been described as a NATO standard for this class.
- A heavy torpedo used primarily as a standoff weapon, particularly by submerged submarines. The 53 cm (21 in) caliber is a common standard.

In the case of deck- or tube-launched torpedoes, the diameter of the torpedo is a key factor in determining the suitability of a particular torpedo to a tube or launcher, similar to the caliber of the gun. The size is not quite as critical as for a gun, but the diameter has become the most common way of classifying torpedoes.

Length, weight, and other factors also contribute to compatibility. In the case of aircraft-launched torpedoes, the key factors are weight, provision of suitable attachment points, and launch speed. Assisted torpedoes are the most recent development in torpedo design, and are normally engineered as an integrated package. Versions for aircraft and assisted launching have sometimes been based on deck or tube launched versions, and there has been at least one case of a submarine torpedo tube being designed to fire an aircraft torpedo.

As in all munition design, there is a compromise between standardization, which simplifies manufacture and logistics, and specialization, which may make the weapon significantly more effective. Small improvements in either logistics or effectiveness can translate into enormous operational advantages.

== Use by various navies ==
=== List of active torpedoes by place of origin ===
Modern heavyweight torpedoes are generally launched from submarines and are used to attack both surface ships and submarines. Relatively older heavyweight torpedoes were generally used to attack either surface ships or submarines. Modern lightweight torpedoes are launched from surface ships, helicopters, and fixed-wing aircraft and are used to attack submarines.

==== China ====
- Yu-11 torpedo (lightweight)
- Yu-7 torpedo (lightweight)
- Yu-6 torpedo (heavyweight)
- Yu-5 torpedo (heavyweight)
- Yu-4 torpedo (heavyweight)

==== France ====
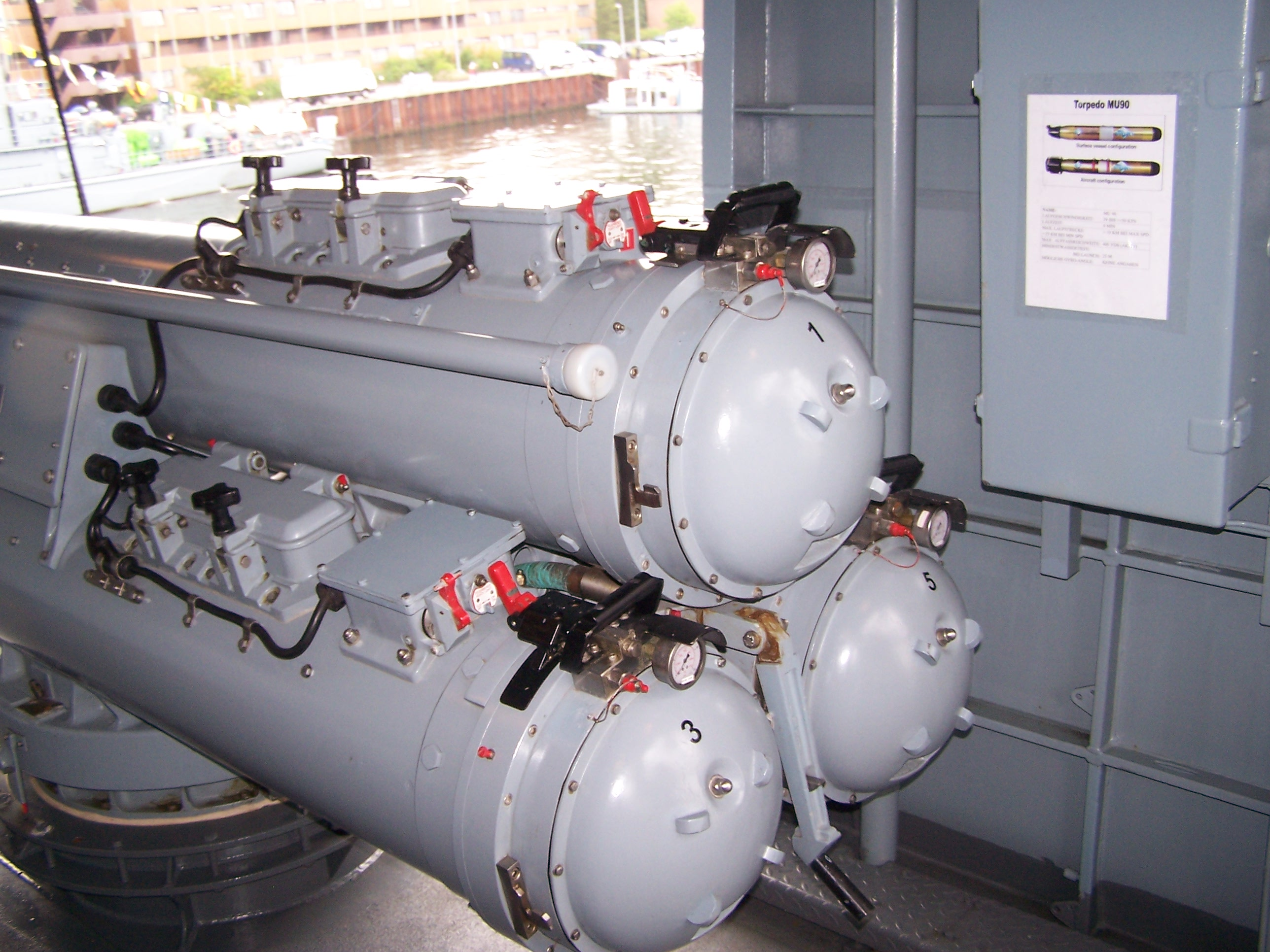
MU90 Impact triple launcher onboard Hessen, a Sachsen-class frigate of the German Navy.

- F21 torpedo (heavyweight)
- F17 torpedo (heavyweight)
- MU90 Impact torpedo (lightweight)

==== Germany ====
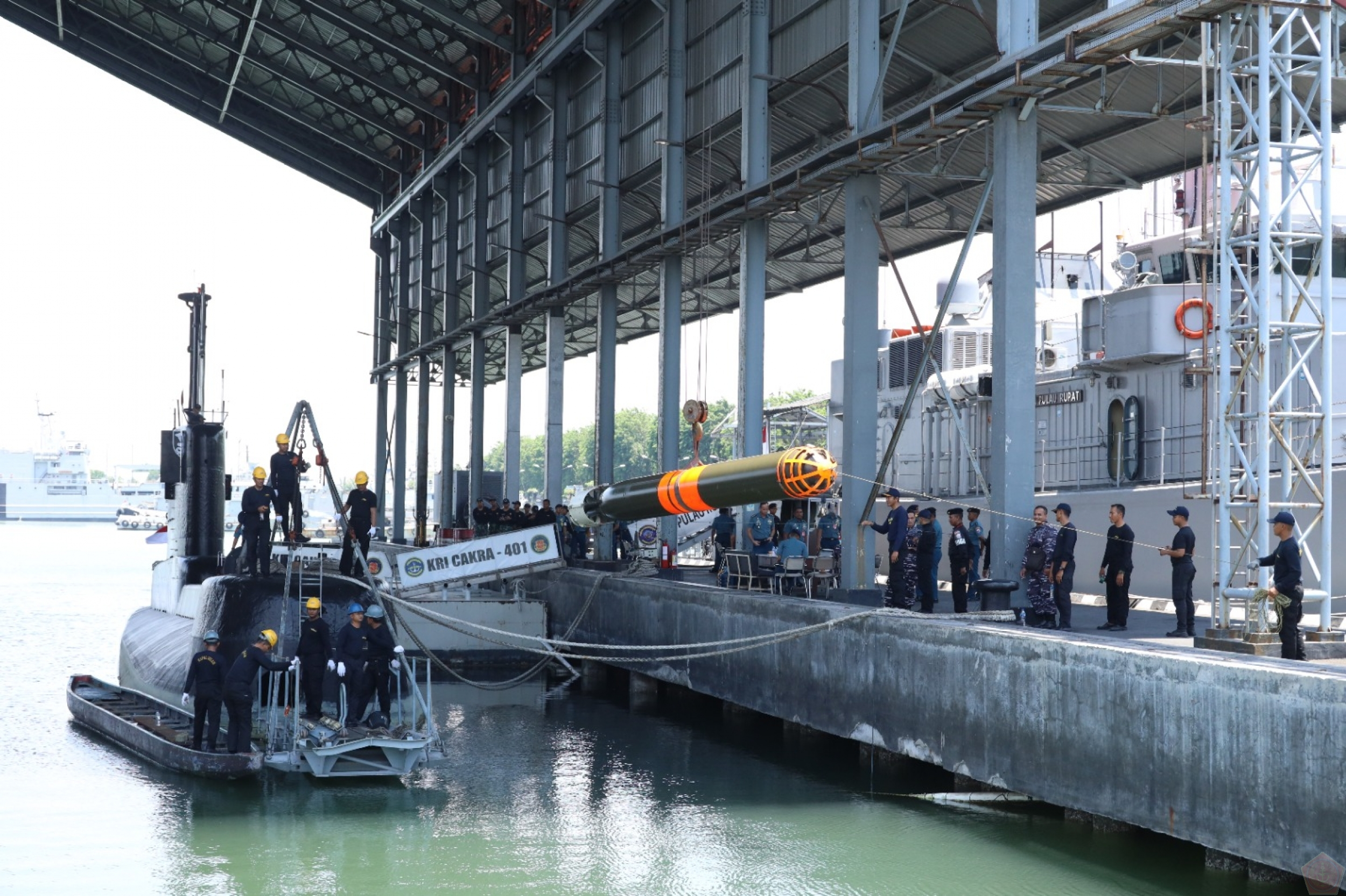
Loading of SUT Torpedo into Indonesian navy submarine, KRI Cakra (401).

- SeaSpider anti-torpedo (lightweight) (Atlas Elektronik)
- DM2A4 torpedo (heavyweight)
- DM2A3 torpedo (heavyweight)
- SUT torpedo (heavyweight)

==== India ====
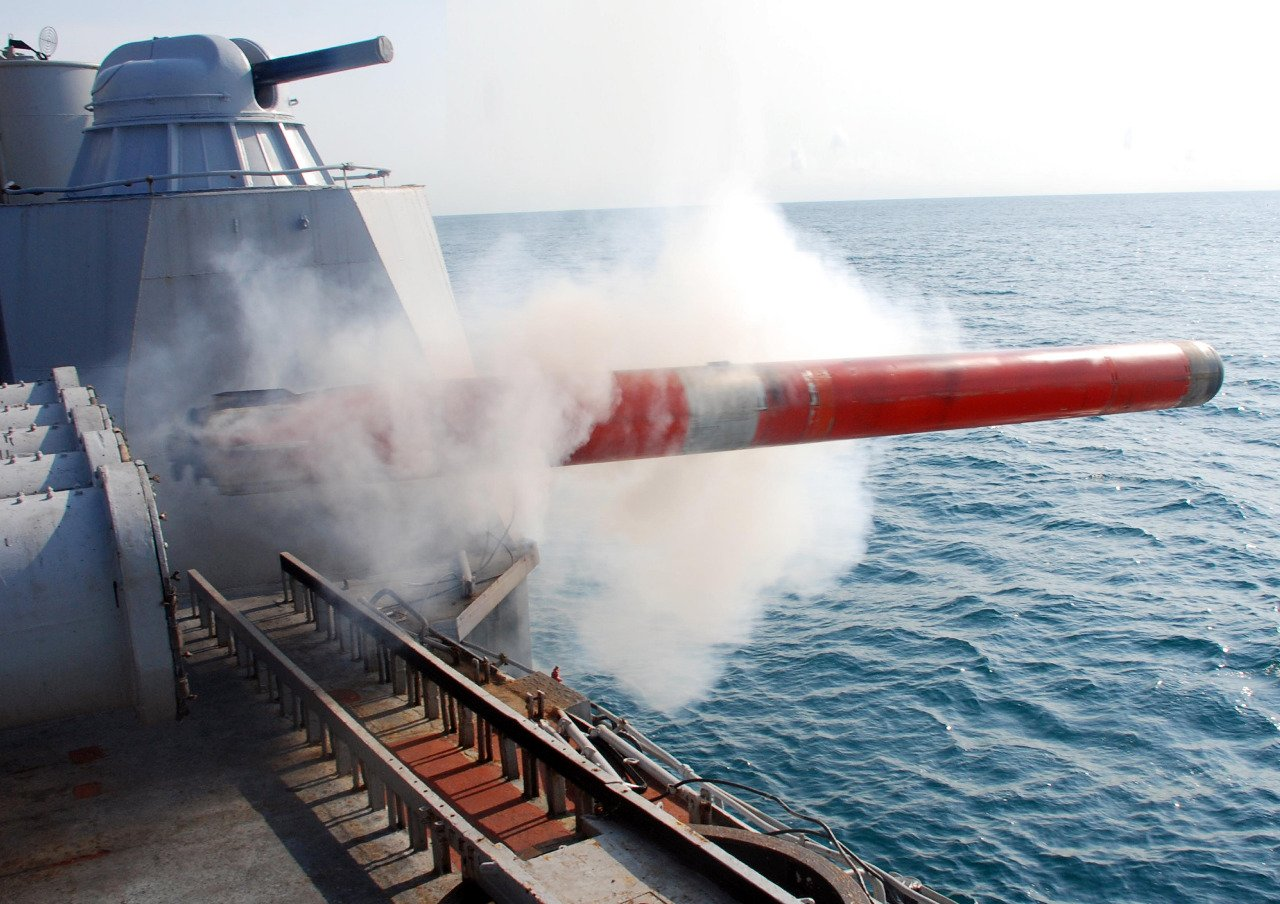
Varunastra heavyweight torpedo

- Varunastra torpedo (heavyweight)
- Takshak torpedo (heavyweight)
- Shakti torpedo (heavyweight)
- Shyena torpedo (lightweight)

==== Iran ====
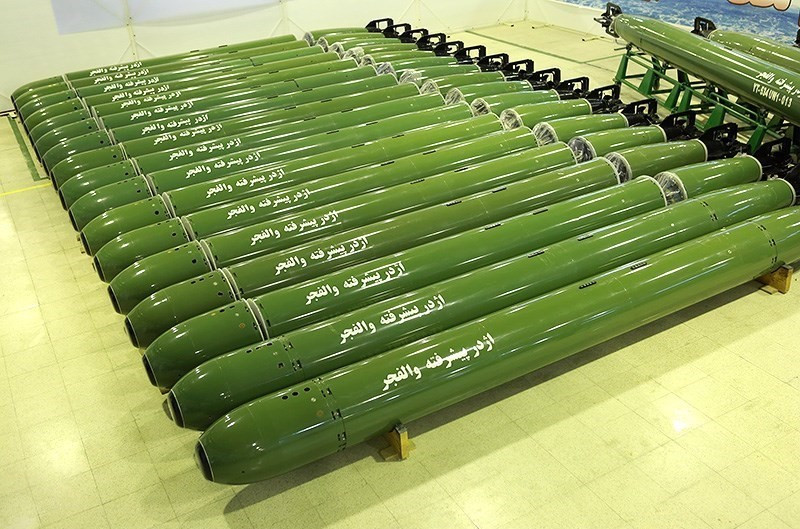
Valfajr heavyweight torpedo

- Valfajr torpedo (heavyweight)
- Hoot supercavitation torpedo (heavyweight)

==== Italy ====
- A184 torpedo (heavyweight)
- A244/S torpedo (lightweight)
- MU90 Impact torpedo (lightweight)
- A200 LCAW torpedo (miniature)
- Black Shark torpedo (heavyweight)
- Black Arrow torpedo (lightweight)
- Black Scorpion torpedo (miniature)

==== Japan ====
- Type 80 (G-RX1) torpedo (heavyweight)
- Type 89 (G-RX2) torpedo (heavyweight)
- Type 97 (G-RX4) torpedo (lightweight)
- Type 12 (G-RX5) torpedo (lightweight)
- Type 18 (G-RX6) torpedo (heavyweight)

==== Pakistan ====
- Eghraaq

==== Russia ====
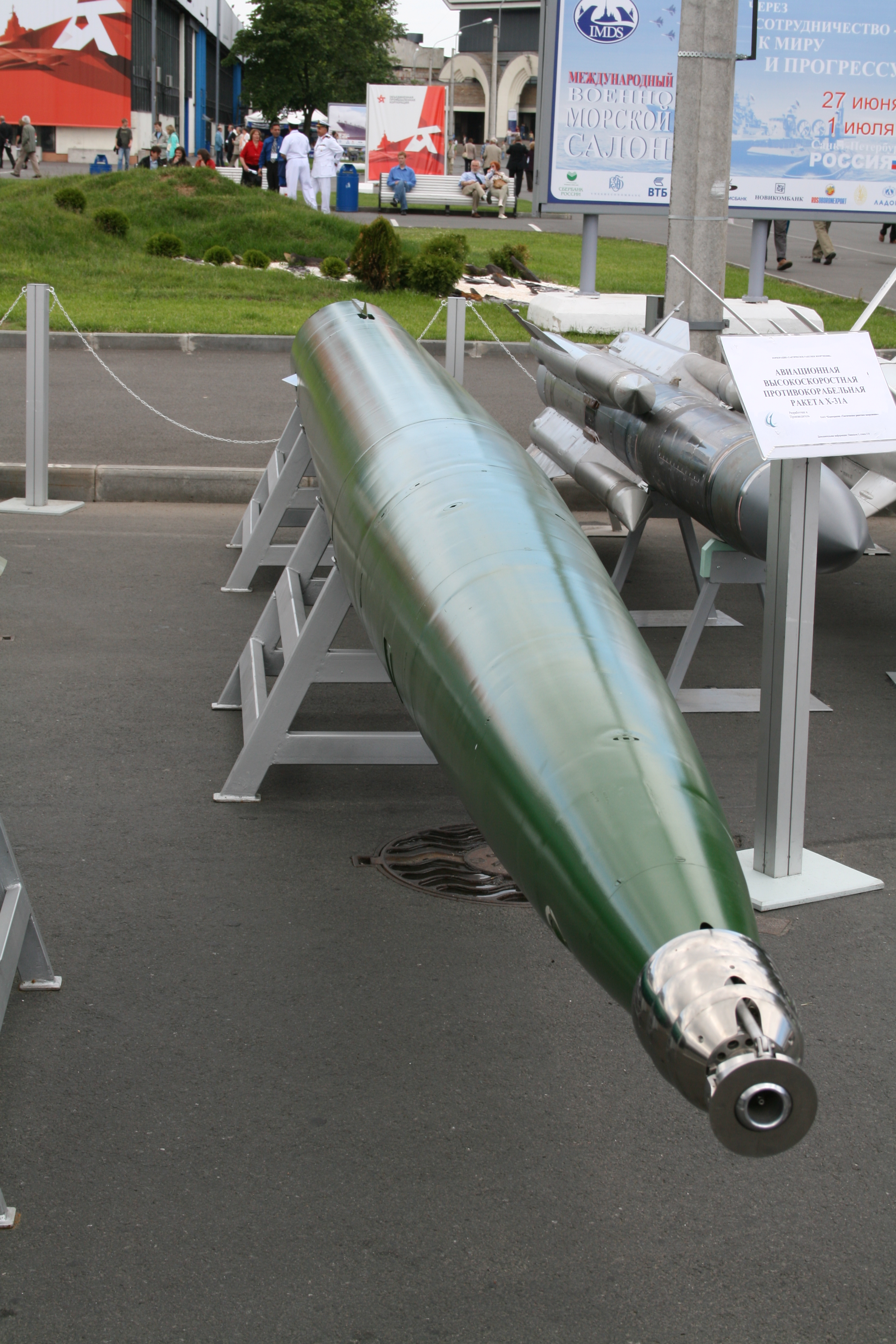
VA-111 Shkval supercavitating torpedo

- Status-6 Oceanic Multipurpose System (nuclear-powered, nuclear-armed UUV)
- Futlyar (Fizik-2) (heavyweight)
- Type 53 torpedo family including Fizik (UGST), USET-80 (heavyweight)
- TEST 71/76 torpedo (heavyweight)
- VA-111 Shkval supercavitation torpedo (heavyweight)
- Type 65 torpedo (heavyweight)
- APR-3E torpedo (lightweight)
- APR-2 torpedo (lightweight)

In April 2015, the Fizik (UGST) heat-seeking torpedo entered service to replace the wake-homing USET-80 developed in the 1980s, and the next-gen Futlyar entered service in 2017.

==== Republic of Korea ====
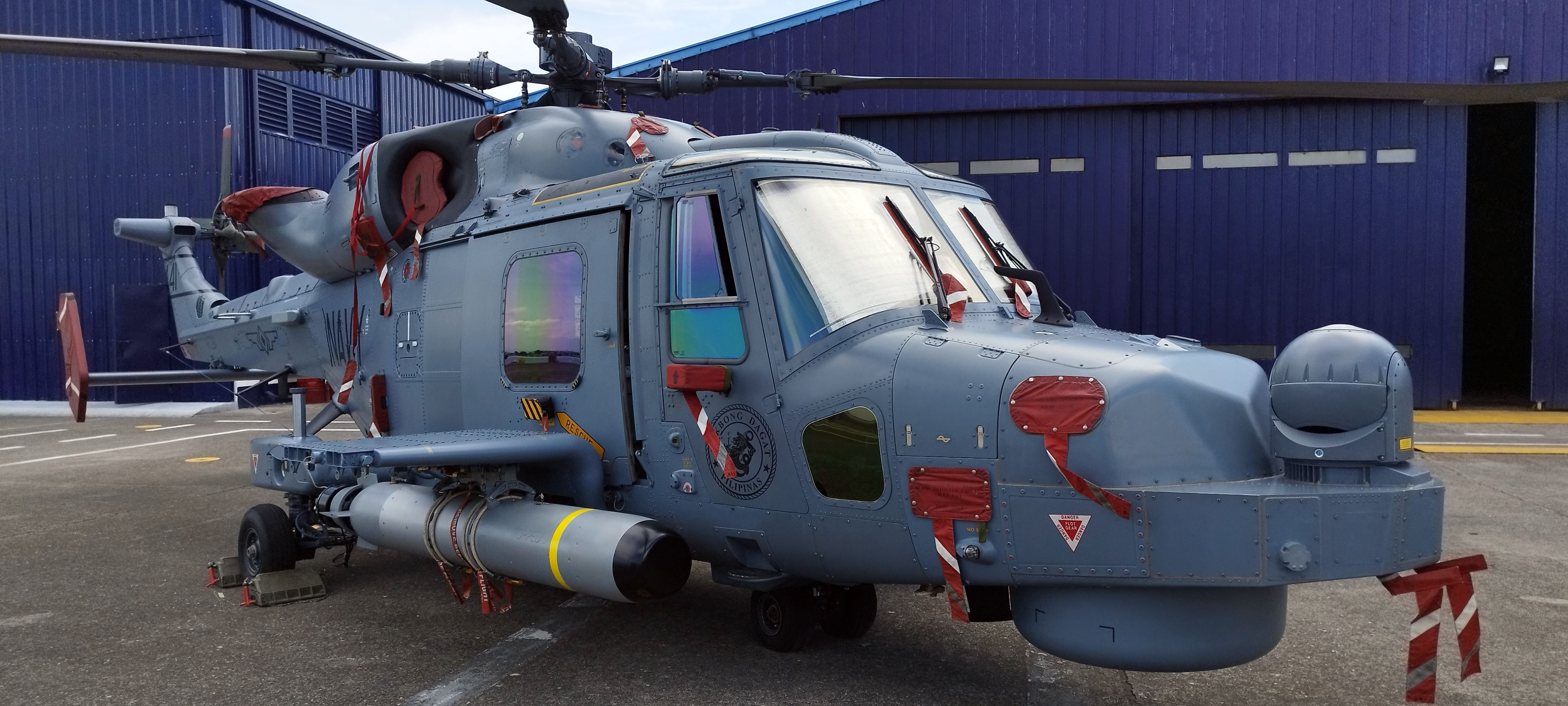
AW159 Wildcat helicopter of the Philippine Navy armed with K745 Blue Shark torpedoes taken at the Philippine Fleet Defense Expo (PFDX) 2023

- K731 White Shark torpedo (heavyweight)
- K745 Blue Shark torpedo (lightweight)
- K761 Tiger Shark torpedo (heavyweight)

==== Sweden ====
- Torped 613 (heavyweight)
- Torped 62 (heavyweight)
- Torped 47 (lightweight)
- Torped 45 (lightweight)

==== Turkey ====
- Roketsan Akya torpedo (heavyweight)
- Roketsan Orka torpedo (lightweight)

==== United Kingdom ====
- Spearfish torpedo (heavyweight)
- Tigerfish torpedo (heavyweight)
- Sting Ray torpedo (lightweight)

==== United States of America ====
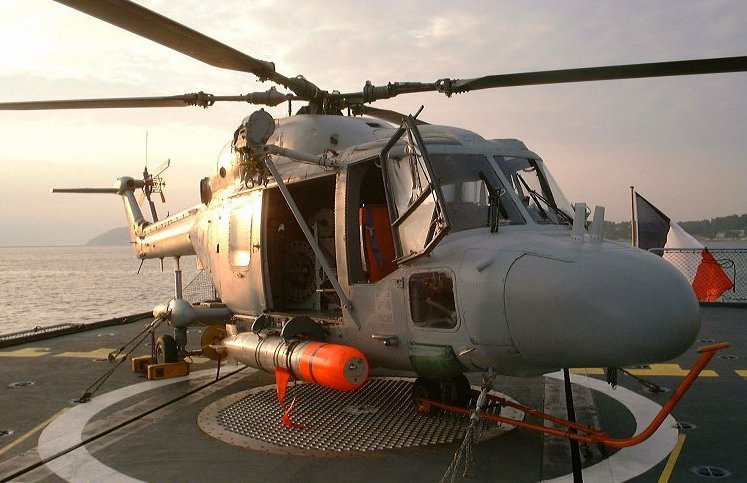
A French Lynx helicopter carrying a Mark 46 torpedo

- Mark 58 CRAW torpedo (very lightweight)
- Mark 54 torpedo (lightweight)
- Mark 50 torpedo (lightweight)
- Mark 48 torpedo (heavyweight)
- Mark 46 torpedo (lightweight)

=== List of key WWII torpedoes ===
The torpedoes used by the Imperial Japanese Navy (World War II) included:

- Japanese 53 cm torpedoes (up to Type 96); Type 89, Type 95, Type 96 most significant
- Japanese 45 cm torpedoes; Type 44, Type 91, Type 97/98 most significant
- Japanese 61 cm torpedoes; Type 90, Type 93 most significant
- Type 91 torpedo
- Type 92 torpedo
- Type 93 torpedo (Long Lance)
- Type 95 torpedo
- Type 97 torpedo
- Kaiten

The torpedoes used by the World War II Kriegsmarine included:

- G7a(TI)
- G7e(TII)
- G7e(TIII)
- G7es(TIV) "Falke"
- G7es(TV) "Zaunkönig"

The torpedoes used by the World War II Royal Navy included:

- British 21-inch torpedoes (up to Mark XI); Mark VIII and Mark IX most significant
- British 18-inch torpedoes (up to Mark XVII); Mark XII and Mark XV most significant

The torpedoes used by the World War II United States Navy included:

- Mark 18 torpedo
- Mark 15 torpedo
- Mark 14 torpedo

== See also ==
- Anti-submarine weapon
- Autonomous Underwater Vehicle
- Bangalore torpedo
- Human torpedo
- List of torpedoes
- Missile guidance
- Nuclear torpedo
- André Rebouças, who supposedly developed a torpedo in the Paraguayan War (1864–1870)
- Shock factor
- Torpedo defence
- Unmanned underwater vehicle
