= Bliss-Leavitt Mark 3 torpedo =

- Type: Anti-surface ship torpedo
- Place of origin: United States

Service history
- In service: 1906–1922
- Used by: United States Navy

Production history
- Designer: Frank McDowell Leavitt
- Designed: 1906
- Manufacturer: E. W. Bliss Company
- No. built: 208

Specifications
- Mass: approximately 1500 pounds
- Length: 197 inches (5.0 meters)
- Diameter: 21 inches (53.34 centimeters)
- Effective firing range: 4000 yards
- Warhead: wet guncotton
- Warhead weight: approximately 200 pounds
- Detonation mechanism: War Nose Mk 5 contact exploder
- Engine: Contra-rotating turbine
- Maximum speed: 26 knots
- Guidance system: gyroscope
- Launch platform: battleships, torpedo boats and cruisers

The Bliss-Leavitt Mark 3 torpedo was a Bliss-Leavitt torpedo adopted by the United States Navy in 1906 for use in an anti-surface ship role.

== Characteristics ==
The Bliss-Leavitt Mark 3 was very similar to the Bliss-Leavitt Mark 2 torpedo. The primary difference was a longer range of 4000 yards. Approximately 200 Mark 3s were produced for the US Navy.

The Bliss-Leavitt Mark 3 was launched from battleships, torpedo boats and cruisers.

== See also ==
- American 21-inch torpedo
