= Bliss-Leavitt Mark 4 torpedo =

- Type: Anti-surface ship torpedo
- Place of origin: United States

Service history
- In service: 1908–1922
- Used by: United States Navy

Production history
- Designer: Frank McDowell Leavitt
- Designed: 1908
- Manufacturer: E. W. Bliss Company
- No. built: 100
- Variants: Mod 1

Specifications
- Mass: approximately 1500 pounds
- Length: 197 inches (5.0 meters)
- Diameter: 17.7 inches (45 centimeters)
- Detonation mechanism: War Nose Mk 1 contact exploder
- Engine: Vertical turbine
- Guidance system: gyroscope
- Launch platform: submarines

The Bliss-Leavitt Mark 4 torpedo was a Bliss-Leavitt torpedo developed and produced by the E. W. Bliss Company in 1908. It was the first American-built torpedo specifically designed to be launched from a submarine. About 100 Mark 4s were purchased for experimental purposes by the United States Navy, which led to design improvements to the gyro and the reducing valve. It was used on submarines of the C and D classes. The Mark 4, and all other torpedoes designed before the Bliss-Leavitt Mark 7 torpedo, were considered obsolete and withdrawn from service in 1922.

== See also ==
- American 18-inch torpedo
