= Nevada-class battleship =

Dreadnought battleship class of the United States Navy

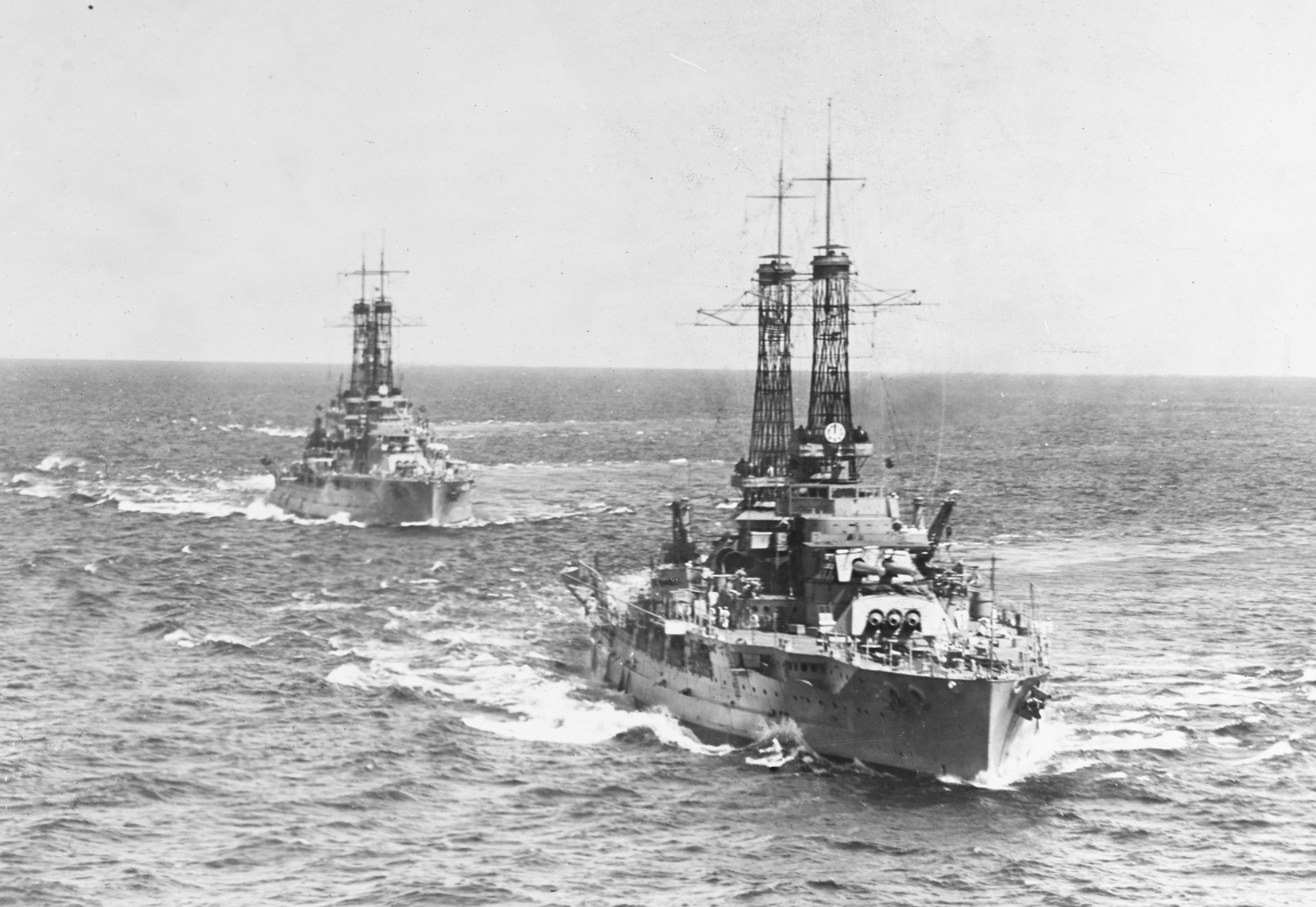
- Nevada (foreground) and Oklahoma (background) steaming in the Atlantic in the 1920s

Class overview
- Name: Nevada-class battleship
- Builders: Bethlehem, Fore River Yard, MA (1); New York Shipbuilding, NJ (1)
- Operators: United States Navy
- Preceded by: New York class
- Succeeded by: Pennsylvania class
- Built: 1912–1916
- In commission: 1916–1946
- Completed: 2
- Lost: 1
- Retired: 1

General characteristics (Original configuration)
- Type: Dreadnought battleship
- Displacement: Standard: 27,500 long tons (27,900 t); Full load: 28,400 long tons (28,900 t)
- Length: Length at the waterline: 575 ft (175 m); Length overall: 583 ft (178 m)
- Beam: 95 ft 2.5 in (29.0 m)
- Draft: Normal: 28 ft 6 in (8.7 m)
- Installed power: 12 × water-tube boilers; Nevada: 26,500 shp (19,800 kW); Oklahoma: 24,800 ihp (18,500 kW)
- Propulsion: 2 × screw propellers; Nevada: 2 × steam turbines; Oklahoma: 2 × triple-expansion steam engines
- Speed: 20.5 knots (38 km/h; 24 mph)
- Range: 8,000 nmi (9,206 mi; 14,816 km) at 10 knots (19 km/h; 12 mph)
- Complement: 55 officers; 809 enlisted men
- Armament: 10 × 14 in (356 mm) /45 caliber guns; 21 × 5 in (127 mm) /51 caliber guns; 2 × 21 in (533 mm) torpedo tubes
- Armor: Belt: 8–13.5 in (203–343 mm); Barbettes: 13 in (330 mm); Turret face: 16–18 in (406–457 mm); Conning tower: 16 in; Deck: 3 to 6.25 in (76 to 159 mm)

General characteristics (After 1927–1930 refit)
- Displacement: Standard: 30,500 long tons (31,000 t); Full load: 33,901 long tons (34,445 t)
- Installed power: 6 × Bureau Express boilers; 25,000 shp (19,000 kW)
- Range: 15,700 nmi (29,100 km; 18,100 mi) at 10 knots
- Complement: 1,374
- Armament: 10 × 14 in /45 guns; 12 x 5 in /51 guns; 8 x 5 in /25 guns; 8 × 0.5 in (13 mm) Browning machine guns

General characteristics (Nevada after 1942 refit)
- Sensors & processing systems: SC air search radar
- Armament: 10 × 14 in /45 caliber guns; 16 × 5 in /38 dual-purpose guns; 36 × Bofors 40 mm (1.6 in) guns; 38 × Oerlikon 20 mm (0.79 in) autocannon

The Nevada class comprised two dreadnought battleships—Nevada and Oklahoma—built for the United States Navy in the 1910s. (Note: They have also been called "super" dreadnoughts.) They were significant developments in battleship design, being the first in the world to adopt "all or nothing" armor, a major step forward in armor protection because it emphasized protection optimized for long-range engagements before the Battle of Jutland demonstrated the need for such a layout. They also introduced three-gun turrets and oil-fired water-tube boilers to the US fleet. The two Nevadas were the progenitors of the standard-type battleship, a group that included the next four classes of broadly similar battleships that were intended to be tactically homogeneous.

Nevada and Oklahoma deployed to Ireland in 1918 to escort convoys during World War I but saw no action. After the war, they were transferred to the Pacific Fleet, where they spent most of the 1920s and 1930s. During this period, they conducted extensive training operations and made several long-distance cruises, including to Australia and New Zealand in 1925 and Oklahoma's voyage to Europe in 1936. Both vessels were extensively modernized between 1927 and 1930, having their armament improved, protection scheme strengthened, and new boilers installed. They were moored in Battleship Row in Pearl Harbor when the Japanese attacked on 7 December 1941; Oklahoma was sunk in the attack while Nevada was able to get underway before being forced to ground herself to avoid sinking in deeper water.

Only Nevada was salvageable, and she was repaired and modernized by mid-1943 when she joined the Aleutian Islands campaign. She then supported the Normandy landings in June 1944 and Operation Dragoon in August before returning to the Pacific in time for the Battle of Iwo Jima in February 1945, followed by the Battle of Okinawa from March to June. Worn out by the end of the war, she was allocated to Operation Crossroads in late 1945 for use in the nuclear weapons tests in mid-1946. She survived both of the Crossroads blasts and was ultimately sunk with conventional weapons off Hawaii in 1948. Oklahoma, meanwhile, was raised over the course of 1943, partially dismantled in 1944, and sold to ship breakers in 1946. While under tow to San Francisco in May 1947, she became separated from the vessel towing her and foundered.

== Development ==
The design of the Nevada class took place in the context of strong political opposition to the continual growth (and thus increases in cost) of battleship building that had accelerated with the development of the dreadnought type. In the early 1900s, the Navy had settled on a program of two new battleships per year, a plan approved by President Theodore Roosevelt, but beginning in 1904, Congress began to reject the Navy's requests, frequently authorizing only one ship per year, and at times, no new vessels. William Howard Taft, Roosevelt's successor, attempted to pressure Congress to build more ships, but had little success, though he did secure a pair of ships for Fiscal Year 1912, which would become the Nevada class. Woodrow Wilson, who was elected in 1912, opposed what he saw as excessive naval spending and his Secretary of the Navy, Josephus Daniels, blocked proposals from the General Board for larger, more powerful ships as part of an effort to return to two vessels per year. The resulting stabilization of designs produced the standard-type battleship, of which the two Nevadas were the first.

=== Initial design ===
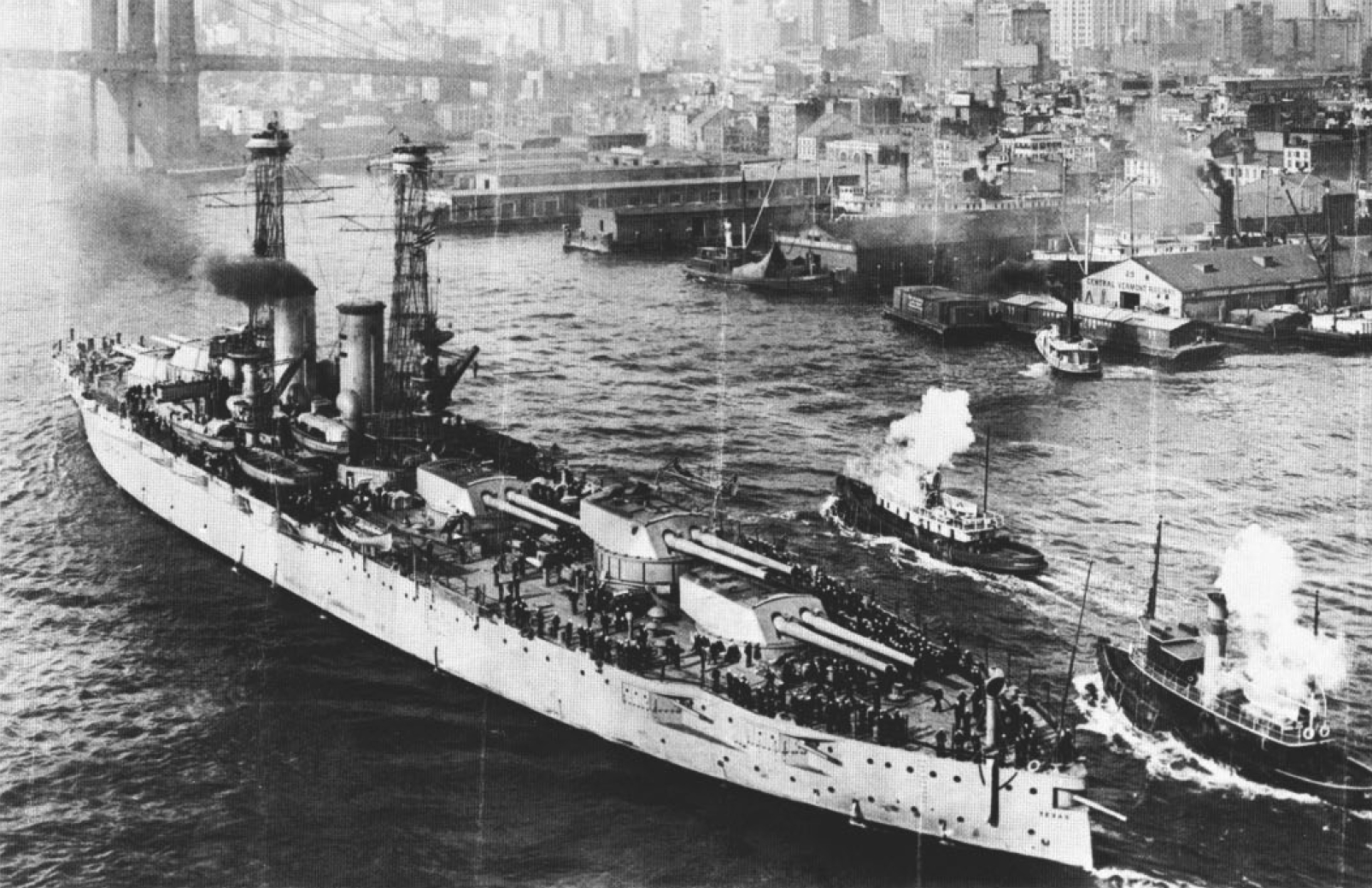
USS Texas of the New York class, which formed the basis for the initial Nevada design

The General Board was not satisfied with the adoption of 5 and 6 twin-gun turrets in earlier dreadnoughts and so requested the next ship be equipped with three-gun turrets. Three-gun turrets would provide a main battery of twelve 14 in (356 mm) guns, two more than the preceding New York class, but with four turrets instead of five. Design work on the ships that would be authorized for FY1912 had begun in 1910, with the first sketch prepared by the Bureau of Construction and Repair (C&R) in May that was based on the preceding New Yorks. The aft superfiring No. 4 turret was removed, the amidships No. 3 turret was moved up to superfire over what had been No. 5 turret in an arrangement similar to contemporary British battlecruisers. It was a complicated arrangement that required an ammunition magazine to separate the engine and boiler rooms; the naval historian Norman Friedman suggests it may have been adopted to reduce the concentration of weight aft, which would have put greater stress on the hull and thus required significant strengthening of the hull structure. The ship would also carry four torpedo tubes and a secondary battery of seventeen 5 in (127 mm) guns, while belt armor was to be 11 in (279 mm) thick.

By this time, the Navy had come to the conclusion that naval engagements would be fought at very long range, and primarily with armor-piercing shells (AP) instead of high-explosive shells, since the latter would be defeated by even medium armor, and at long range, there was no ability to aim specifically at unarmored portions of ships. And because AP shells would easily perforate medium armor plate, only the thickest possible protection should be carried. Another important development that resulted from the assumption of long battle ranges was the adoption of thick deck armor. This was necessitated by the trajectory of the projectiles; as range increased significantly, the angle of impact increased, and thus shells would tend to strike the horizontal deck, not the heavily armored sides, an effect known as plunging fire. The result was the "all or nothing" principle of armor protection, which reserved armor protection only for the ship's vitals, including magazines, propulsion machinery spaces, and command spaces. The arrangement was made watertight to create an armored raft that contained enough reserve buoyancy to keep the ship afloat even if the unarmored ends were completely flooded. The Nevada design was the first of any navy to introduce the concept.

In June, the Board sent a set of requirements to C&R that incorporated the twelve-gun battery already projected, a minimum speed of 21 knots (39 km/h; 24 mph), and an armor layout based on the "all or nothing" concept. The engineers at C&R noted that the armor deck would considerably strengthen the hull, but pointed out that the 11-inch belt of the original design would be wholly insufficient to defeat the latest main guns in foreign navies. The Board suggested the addition of a 1.5 in (38 mm) splinter bulkhead behind the belt, which would contain shell fragments. In late 1910, before a final design was accepted, the Navy had to submit estimates for FY1912 to be voted on by Congress in 1911; they used figures based on the New Yorks, which were accepted by Congress, and in turn limited the size of the new ships to a displacement of around 27,000 long tons (27,000 t); this was too low for C&R's existing proposals, necessitating a redesign. By this time, the first generation of American dreadnoughts had begun to enter service, so experiences operating them could be incorporated into the redesign.

=== Redesign and approval ===
The first major change was the arrangement of the aft pair of turrets. The amidships magazine of the battleship Delaware had difficulty remaining cool, as it was adjacent to the boiler room and the steam lines for the propulsion system ran alongside it. Since the thicker deck increased hull strength, the initial arrangement proposed for Nevada could be abandoned in favor of a closely spaced superfiring pair. This shortened the length of hull that required armor protection, and thus reduced displacement. Experience with Delaware's propulsion system—which mixed coal and oil fired boilers—provided the next improvement: boilers that were exclusively oil fired. These would confer a number of advantages, including the ability to refuel at sea, a significant reduction in boiler room crews, greater fuel efficiency, and more compact boiler rooms, among others. Again, the smaller boiler rooms shortened the length of armor necessary to protect the vitals. C&R was not convinced, since coal bunkers had been used to reinforce the side armor, but the Board approved the change in November 1910. Even by that time, the engineers at C&R continued to lobby for their original design based on the New York class, but the Board refused to entertain the proposal. Next, the Board decided to return to steam turbines rather than triple-expansion engines, as they believed the greater efficiency of fuel oil would allow the notoriously voracious turbines to achieve the long cruising radius necessary for operations in the Pacific Ocean.

Nevada in her original configuration

C&R submitted its next proposal on 13 February 1911; it generally aligned with the Board's ideas for the armor layout, but it retained some medium armor to protect the secondary guns and it incorporated triple-expansion machinery (though they noted that the engine rooms could accommodate Curtis turbines). The Board rejected it, leading the designers to remove the medium armor, producing a series of studies with speeds of 20 knots (37 km/h; 23 mph), 20.5 knots (38 km/h; 24 mph), and 21 knots and main batteries that ranged from eight to twelve guns. During this period, on 4 March, Congress authorized a pair of ships, designated BB-36 and BB-37 for FY1912. With the ships now authorized, the Board selected one of the ten-gun, 20.5-knot variations on 30 March, which had a belt that was increased to 14 in but included a series of tapers at the top and bottom edge to save weight. The Bureau of Ordnance pointed out that the belt could not be manufactured in a single strake with the tapers, so a joint between upper and lower strakes—a design weakness the engineers had been attempting to avoid—would have to be used. The problem was resolved in July, when C&R proposed removing the 1.5-inch splinter bulkhead in favor of increasing the belt to 13.5 in (343 mm) and incorporating only one taper at the lower edge.

The next issue to address was the triple turret that was the linchpin of the design, since the weight savings made the heavier belt possible and it corrected design defects present in the earlier 5- and 6-turret classes. The US Navy had never built a three-gun turret, and there were concerns that a single hit could disable all three guns, and that three holes in the turret face would weaken the armor too much. C&R suggested conducting firing trials with the old battleship Indiana, but nothing came of the proposal. Daniels approved the finalized Nevada design on 31 March, without a completed turret design, which was a significant gamble because the turret design might not have been successful. An experimental turret was completed in August 1912, proving the concept, though it required some modifications to reduce shell interference. Since the finalized design adopted a ten-gun battery, only two of the four turrets would be triple mounts, one forward and one aft, with twin-gun turrets superfiring over them.

With the design nearly finalized, the Board began to circulate it with fleet officers for comment; Captain John Hood, who was soon to become a member of the Board, criticized the placement of the secondary battery, as experience with the early dreadnoughts had shown casemate batteries to be completely unusable in all but the calmest seas. The Board pointed out that the increasing range of torpedoes meant that the standard 5-inch /51 caliber guns could not effectively engage destroyers before they launched their weapons, so retaining the weapons at all might not be worthwhile. But there were no suitable alternative, so the Board decided to keep the 5-inch guns as they were. This proved to be the correct decision, as the development of fire-control systems improved the guns' ability to hit at longer ranges.

== Design ==
=== General characteristics and machinery ===
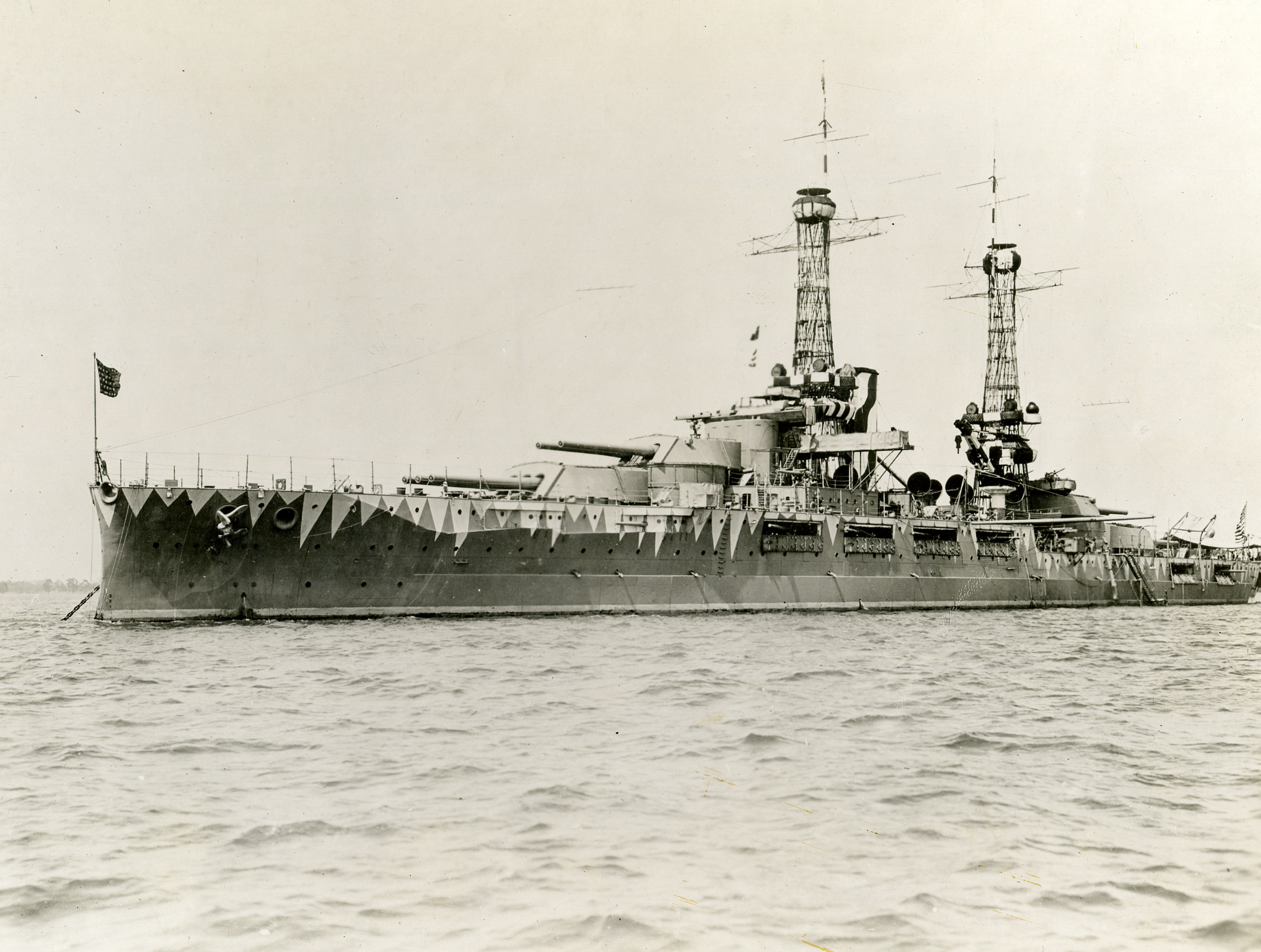
Oklahoma in 1917, painted in an experimental dazzle camouflage

The ships of the Nevada class were 575 ft (175 m) long at the waterline and 583 ft (178 m) long overall. They had a beam of 95 ft 2.5 in (29 m) and a draft of 27 ft 7.6 in (8 m) at normal displacement and 29 ft 6 in (8.99 m) at full load. They displaced 27,500 long tons (27,900 t) as designed and 28,400 long tons (28,900 t) fully laden. The ships had a ram bow and a forecastle deck that extended half of the length of the ship. As built, the ships had a minimal superstructure, consisting of a heavily armored conning tower directly aft of the forward main battery turrets. They were completed with two lattice masts fitted with spotting tops to assist in directing the main battery, a common feature of American capital ships of the period. They had a crew of 55 officers and 809 enlisted men.

Since the Board expected turbines to achieve greater efficiency, Nevada was equipped with a pair of direct-drive Curtis steam turbines, with steam provided by twelve oil-fired Yarrow water-tube boilers. Nevada was the first US capital ship to use reduction geared cruising turbines, which could be clutched into the high-pressure turbines to improve fuel economy at low speeds. Geared turbines were fitted in most subsequent US battleships, except those with turbo-electric propulsion. Oklahoma, meanwhile, received two vertical triple-expansion engines and twelve oil-fired Babcock & Wilcox boilers. Oklahoma's reciprocating engines were prone to excessive vibration, prompting the Navy to consider converting her to double-acting, two-stroke diesel engines in 1925, but the great weight of diesels at the time led to the idea being abandoned. Both ships' boilers were ducted into a single funnel located amidships.

Nevada's engines were rated at 26,500 shaft horsepower (19,800 kW), while those of Oklahoma were projected to produce 24,800 indicated horsepower (18,500 kW). Both ships had a designed top speed of 20.5 knots, though Nevada reached 20.9 knots (38.7 km/h; 24.1 mph) from 26,291 shp (19,605 kW) on speed trials upon completion. Their designed endurance was 8,000 nautical miles (15,000 km; 9,200 mi) at a speed of 10 knots (19 km/h; 12 mph). Under service conditions, Nevada was found to have an endurance of 5,195 nmi (9,621 km; 5,978 mi) at a speed of 12 knots (22 km/h; 14 mph), which fell considerably at 20 knots (37 km/h; 23 mph) to 1,980 nmi (3,670 km; 2,280 mi). With a freshly-cleaned hull, these figures improved slightly, to 6,494 nmi (12,027 km; 7,473 mi) and 2,475 nmi (4,584 km; 2,848 mi), respectively. Nevada had a tactical diameter—the distance it took to turn the ship 180 degrees—of 825 yards (754 m) at 15 knots (28 km/h; 17 mph) and 580 yards (530 m) at 19 knots (35 km/h; 22 mph). The only figure available for Oklahoma is her high-speed turning circle: 625 yards (572 m) at 20 knots (37 km/h; 23 mph).

=== Armament ===
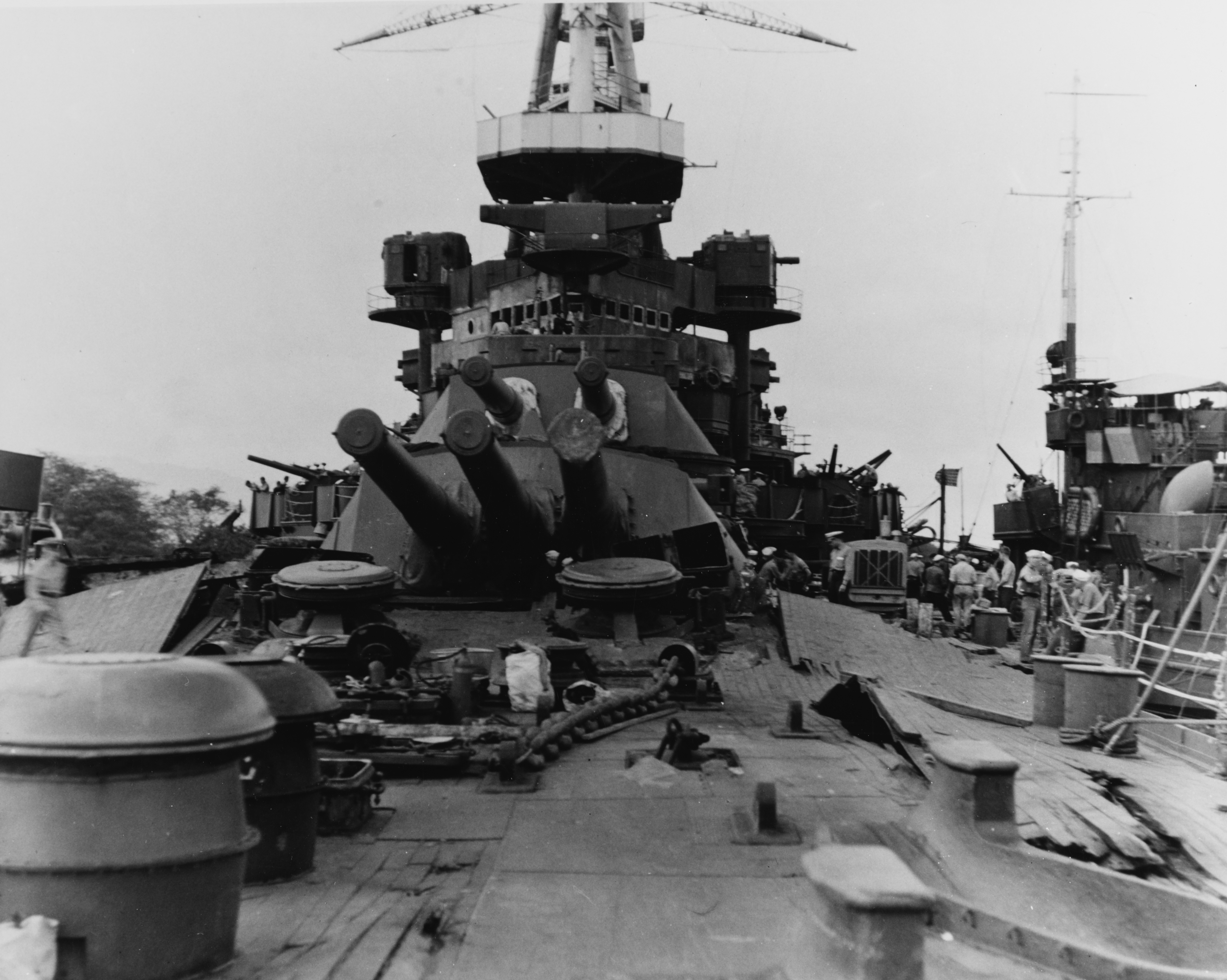
Nevada's forward turrets; note the bomb damage from the attack on Pearl Harbor

The Nevadas were equipped with a main battery of ten 14-inch /45 caliber Mark III guns (Note: "/45 caliber" refers to the length of the gun in terms of calibers, or the bore diameter of the gun.) mounted in two twin and two triple turrets. To save weight and keep the mounts as compact as possible, the triple turrets had all three barrels supported by two trunnions, which required all three guns to be elevated as a unit. Both of the twin turrets had armored rangefinders installed atop their roofs, with a centralized fire control room in the conning tower.

The guns fired a 1,400-pound (635 kg) armor-piercing (AP) shell at a muzzle velocity of 2,600 feet per second (790 m/s). Trials with the triple turret revealed excessive dispersion caused by interference between the projectiles while in flight, so a system was adopted to fire each gun individually, separated by a tenth of a second apiece. The turrets allowed elevation to 15 degrees and depression to −5 degrees. At maximum elevation, the guns had a range of about 21,140 yd (19,330 m). Two shell hoists serviced all three guns, which were electrically loaded and operated.

For defense against destroyers and torpedo boats, the ships carried a secondary battery of twenty-one 5-inch /51 caliber Mark VIII guns in individual mounts. Twelve of the guns were in casemates in the forecastle deck, six on either side, and another six were in casemates toward the stern at main deck level, with another weapon directly in the stern. These guns proved to be excessively wet in heavy seas and thus were frequently unusable, as experience with earlier vessels had already demonstrated. The last two guns were in open mounts on either side of the conning tower. The guns had a muzzle velocity of 3,150 ft/s (960 m/s) firing a 50-pound (23 kg) shell.

As was customary for capital ships of the period, both vessels were armed with a pair of 21 in (533 mm) torpedo tubes submerged below the waterline, one on each broadside. They were supplied with Bliss-Leavitt torpedoes of the Mark VIII type; these carried a 321 lb (146 kg) warhead and had a range of 12,500 yd (11,400 m) at a speed of 27 kn (50 km/h; 31 mph). Nevada and Oklahoma were the first battleships to carry the Mark VIII torpedoes.

=== Armor ===
The Nevada class was protected by side armor that was 13.5 in thick in the central portion where it protected the ship's vitals, the magazines and propulsion machinery spaces. It was 17 ft 4.6 in (5 m) wide, of which 8 ft 6 in (2.59 m) was below the waterline. At the bottom edge, the belt was reduced to 8 in (203 mm) to save weight, relying on the assumption that shells that fell short and passed through the water would be slowed significantly, thus reducing their ability to penetrate heavy armor. On either end of the belt, both sides were connected by a transverse bulkhead that was 8 to 13 in (330 mm) thick. The bow and stern were left unarmored. The ships had a 3 in (76 mm) armored deck that consisted of special treatment steel (STS) in three layers over the central armored raft; further aft, the deck was increased in thickness to 6.25 in (159 mm), where it covered the propeller shafts. The armor deck was connected to the top of the belt. One deck below, another layer of armor 1.5 in (38 mm) thick was intended to contain splinters from shells and bombs that were detonated by the upper deck. The sides of the deck sloped down and were increased slightly to 2 in (51 mm) thick, and they were connected to the bottom edge of the belt. The lower deck consisted of nickel steel.

The ships' main battery turrets received very heavy armor protection; the triple turret faces were 18 in (457 mm) thick, with 10 in (254 mm) sides and 5 in roofs. The twin-gun turrets had slightly thinner protection, consisting of 16 in (406 mm) faces and 9 in (229 mm) sides. Both turret types had 9 in rears and they rested atop barbettes that were 13 in thick. The conning tower had 16 in sides and a 8 in roof, the latter consisting of STS. The uptakes from the boilers to the funnel were protected by a conical mantlet that was 13 in thick.

=== Modifications ===
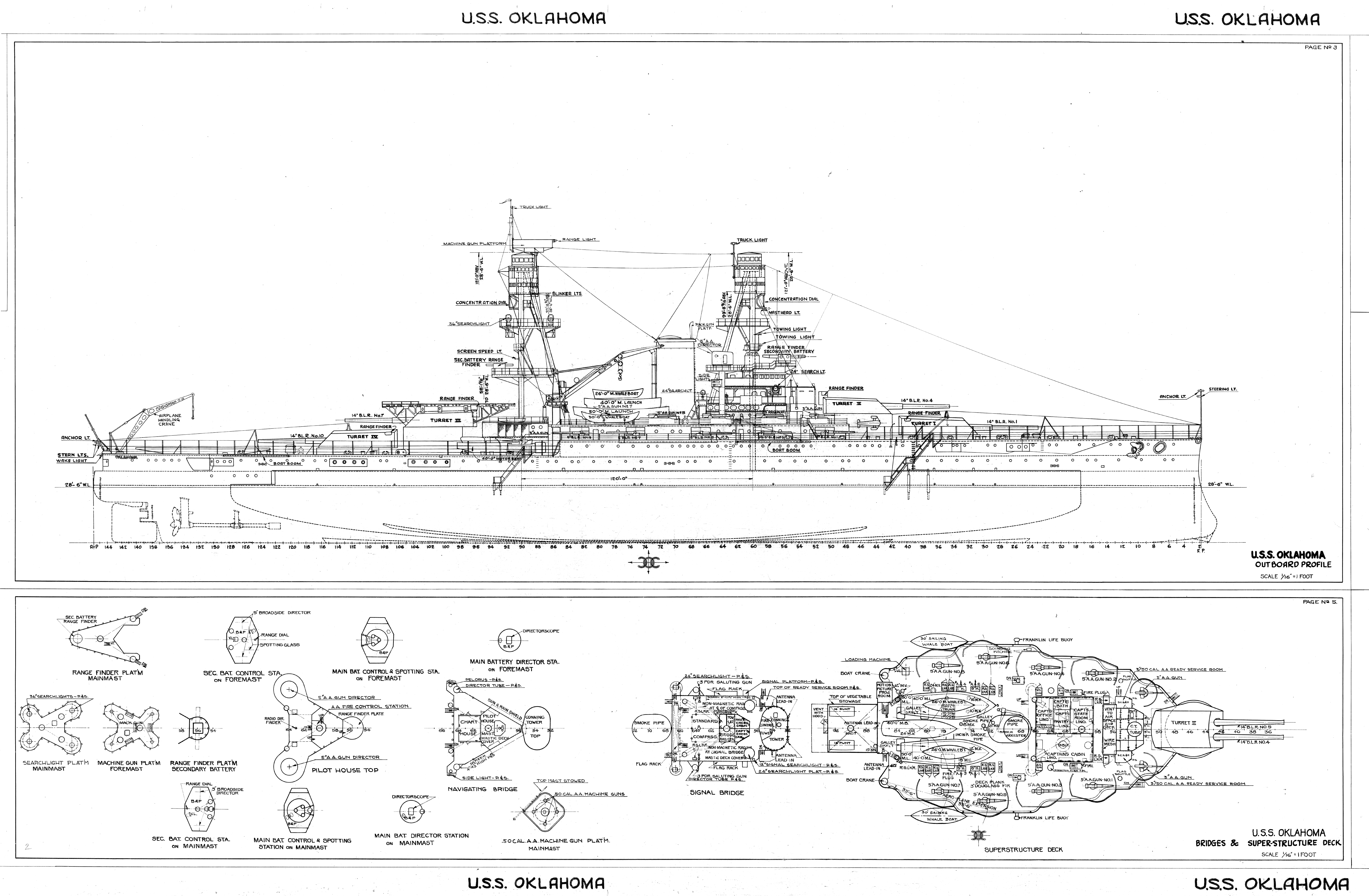
Official drawings of Oklahoma after her refit

The ships underwent a series of changes over the course of their careers, particularly with regards to their secondary batteries, along with the addition of a tertiary anti-aircraft battery. The first such alteration, the addition of a pair of 3 in (76 mm) /50 cal. anti-aircraft guns, was made at the time the ships were completed. In 1918, Nevada had her seven aft-most 5-inch guns removed along with the two guns in open mounts; Oklahoma had the same reduction in her secondary battery, though she retained the centerline gun in the stern. These were used to arm merchant ships that would have a greater likelihood of encountering a German U-boat on the voyage to Europe. In 1919, both ships received flying-off platforms for aircraft on their superfiring turrets, but these proved to be problematic in service, as they prevented the guns from being fired without destroying the ramps and they severely limited the ability of the guns to be elevated and depressed.

In the late 1920s, both ships were substantially modernized. Both were re-boilered with six Bureau Express boilers that were significantly more efficient than the original twelve boilers. In addition, Nevada was re-engined using the turbines that had been installed in North Dakota in 1917 and removed before the latter was scrapped under the terms of the Washington Naval Treaty. Design speed remained the same, but designed horsepower fell slightly to 25,000 shp (19,000 kW) for Nevada. She nevertheless achieved 31,214 shp (23,276 kW) on trials, for a top speed of 20.22 kn (37.45 km/h; 23.27 mph). Fuel capacity was also substantially increased, to 3,148 long tons (3,199 t) normally and 6,274 long tons (6,375 t) for wartime conditions. This increased the ships' range to 15,700 nmi (29,100 km; 18,100 mi) at 10 knots and 6,090 nmi (11,280 km; 7,010 mi) at 15 kn (28 km/h; 17 mph). The re-boilering saved a considerable amount of weight that was used to increase the deck armor and add torpedo bulges that increased their beam to 107 ft 11 in (32.89 m). Both vessels' main armor deck was increased in thickness by 2 in (51 mm), bringing the total to 5 inches, though because it consisted of layers, it was not as effective as a single plate of the same thickness.

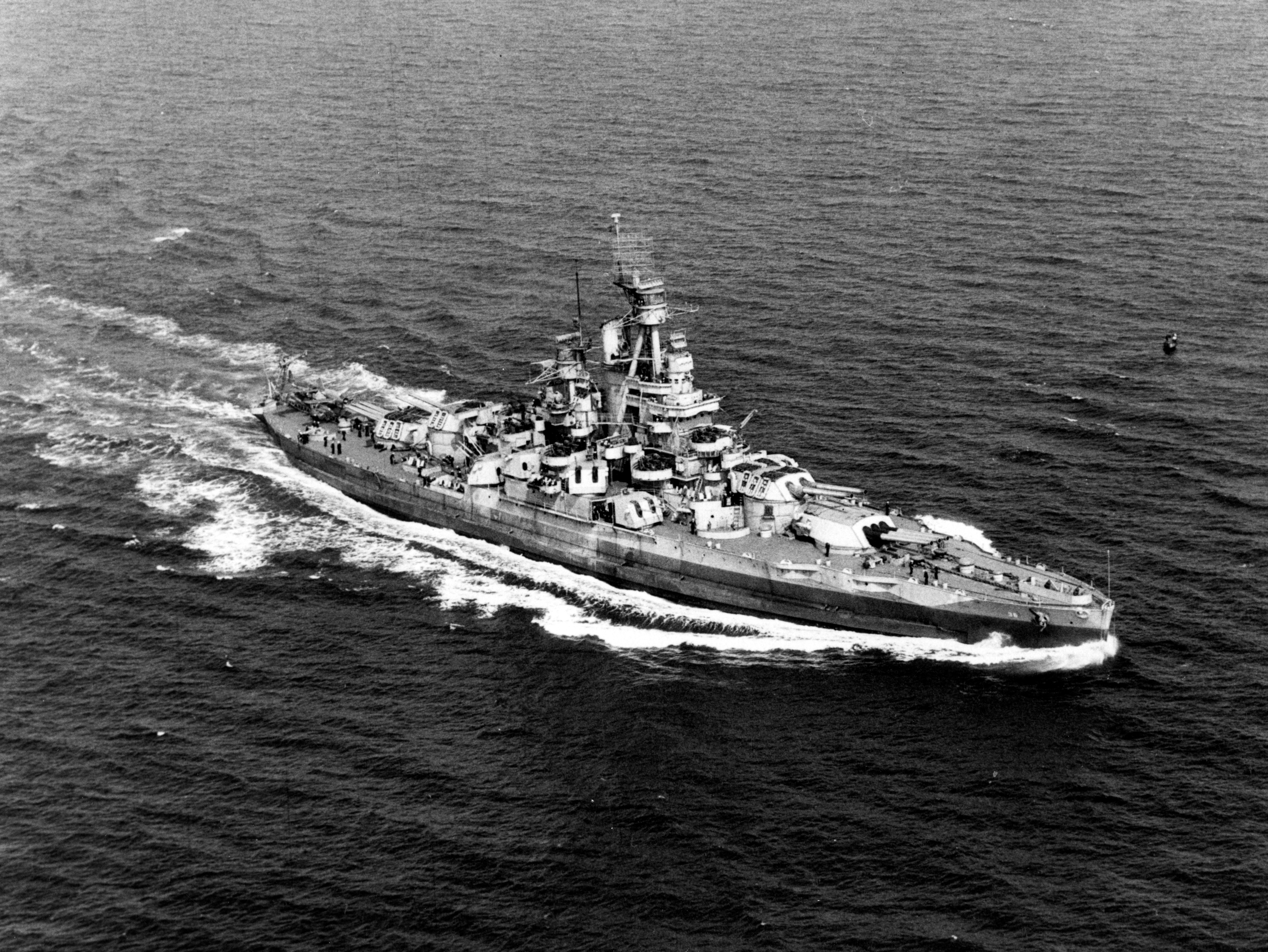
USS Nevada after her 1942 reconstruction

Both vessels' armament was significantly improved. The main battery turrets were modified to allow elevation to thirty degrees, which increased their maximum range to 34,300 yd (31,400 m). The remaining 5-inch casemates were plated over and the guns were moved a deck higher in an attempt to improve their ability to be used in heavy seas. The eight 3-inch anti-aircraft guns were replaced with an equal number of 5-inch /25 cal. guns, also in individual mounts. In addition, they received eight 0.5 in (13 mm) Browning machine guns. Both vessels had their torpedo tubes removed at this time. Their lattice masts were replaced with more robust tripod masts, and they had a pair of aircraft catapults installed, one of which was placed on the fantail, the other being mounted atop her rear superfiring turret. The alterations increased the ships' displacement to 30,500 long tons (31,000 t) as designed and a maximum of 33,901 long tons (34,445 t) at full load. The ships' crews increased to 1,374. At some point in 1941, Nevada was fitted with an SC air search radar.

In 1942, during repairs for the damage sustained in the Japanese attack on Pearl Harbor, Nevada was again heavily reconstructed. Her tripod mainmast was removed, along with her heavily armored conning tower, the former to clear up firing arcs for the anti-aircraft weaponry and the latter to save weight for further additions to the anti-aircraft battery. In place of the conning tower and mast, a large bridge structure was installed She had both her 51-cal. and 25-cal. guns removed. They were replaced with battery of sixteen 5-inch /38 cal. Mark 12 dual purpose guns in eight twin gun mounts. Four were mounted on either side of the vessel amidships. The guns fired a 55.18-pound (25.03 kg) shell to a maximum range of 17,392 yards (15,903 m) or a maximum altitude of 37,200 feet (11,300 m) at an elevation of 45 degrees. Her light anti-aircraft battery was completely replaced as well; she now carried thirty-six Bofors 40 mm (1.6 in) guns in nine quadruple mounts and thirty-eight Oerlikon 20 mm (0.79 in) autocannon in individual mounts. By the end of the war, she had received an additional quadruple 40 mm mount, while her 20 mm guns were reorganized into five single and twenty twin mounts, for a total of forty-five barrels. Unlike many of the other battleships rebuilt after the attack, Nevada did not receive newer gun directors for her main battery, instead retaining her older Mark 20 directors, but she was fitted with Mark 37 directors for her new secondary battery.

== Ships in class ==
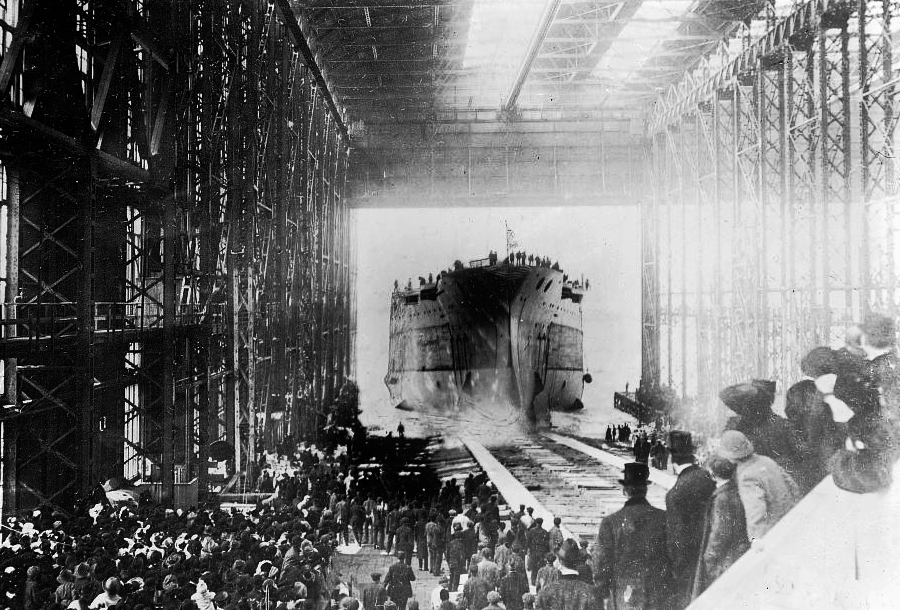
Oklahoma at her launching

Construction data
Ship name	Hull no.	Builder	Laid down	Launched	Commissioned	Fate
Nevada	BB-36	Bethlehem Steel Corporation, Fore River Shipyard, Quincy, Massachusetts	4 November 1912	11 July 1914	11 March 1916	Struck 12 August 1948; Sunk as a target 31 July 1948
Oklahoma	BB-37	New York Shipbuilding Corporation, Camden, New Jersey	26 October 1912	23 March 1914	2 May 1916	Struck 1 September 1944; Hulk sank while under tow, 17 May 1947

== Service history ==
=== Early careers ===
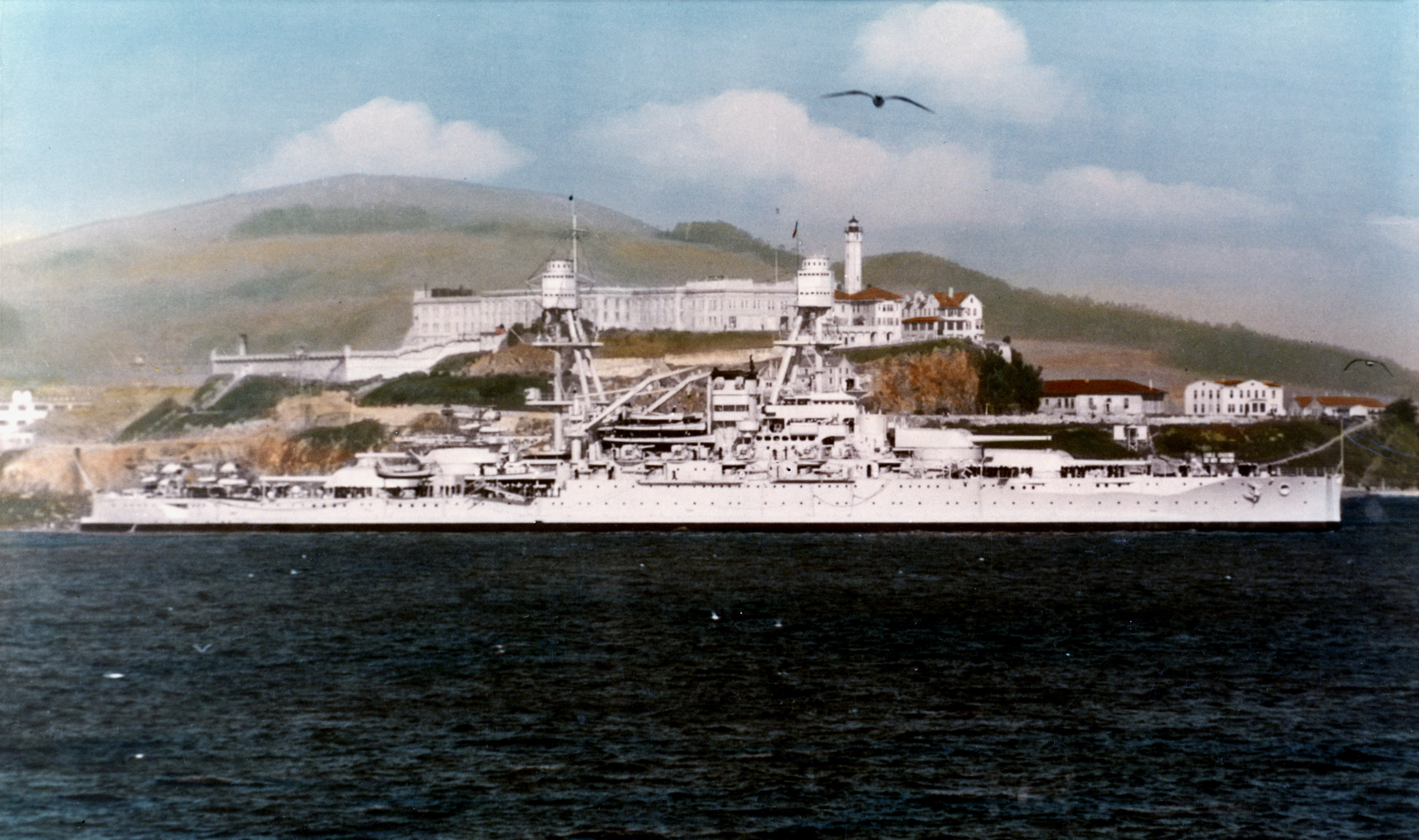
Oklahoma steaming off Alcatraz in the 1930s

After entering service in 1916, both vessels were assigned to the Atlantic Fleet. They were occupied with training exercises off the East Coast of the United States into early 1918, by which time the United States had entered World War I on the side of the Allies. Both vessels were sent to Ireland in August 1918 to escort troopship convoys against German warships that might try to break out of the North Sea to intercept them, though no such attacks materialized. Both were present for President Wilson's arrival in France to participate in the Versailles Conference at the end of the conflict. After the war, both vessels returned to the Atlantic Fleet, though in 1919, Nevada was transferred to the Pacific Fleet; Oklahoma joined her there in 1921.

Throughout the 1920s, both ships participated in a yearly routine of training exercises with the rest of the fleet, including shooting practice, tactical training, and annual, large-scale Fleet Problems, the latter providing the basis for the US Navy's operations in the Pacific War, and experience that demonstrated that the standard-type battleships were too slow to operate with aircraft carriers led to the development of the fast battleships built in the 1930s. They were also involved in cruises around the Americas and further abroad, such as a goodwill visit to Australia and New Zealand in 1925. Between 1927 and 1930, both ships were heavily modernized. The standard peacetime routine continued through the 1930s. In 1936, Oklahoma embarked on a training cruise to Europe; she was there when the Spanish Civil War broke out that year, and she went to Spain to evacuate Americans in the country.

As tensions with Japan began to rise in the late 1930s over the latter's waging of the Second Sino-Japanese War, the United States began to prepare for the increasingly likely prospect of war. In 1940, the Pacific Fleet was transferred from its homeport, San Pedro, California, to Pearl Harbor in Hawaii in an effort to deter further aggression. Both ships were at anchor in Battleship Row along Ford Island in December 1941.

=== World War II ===
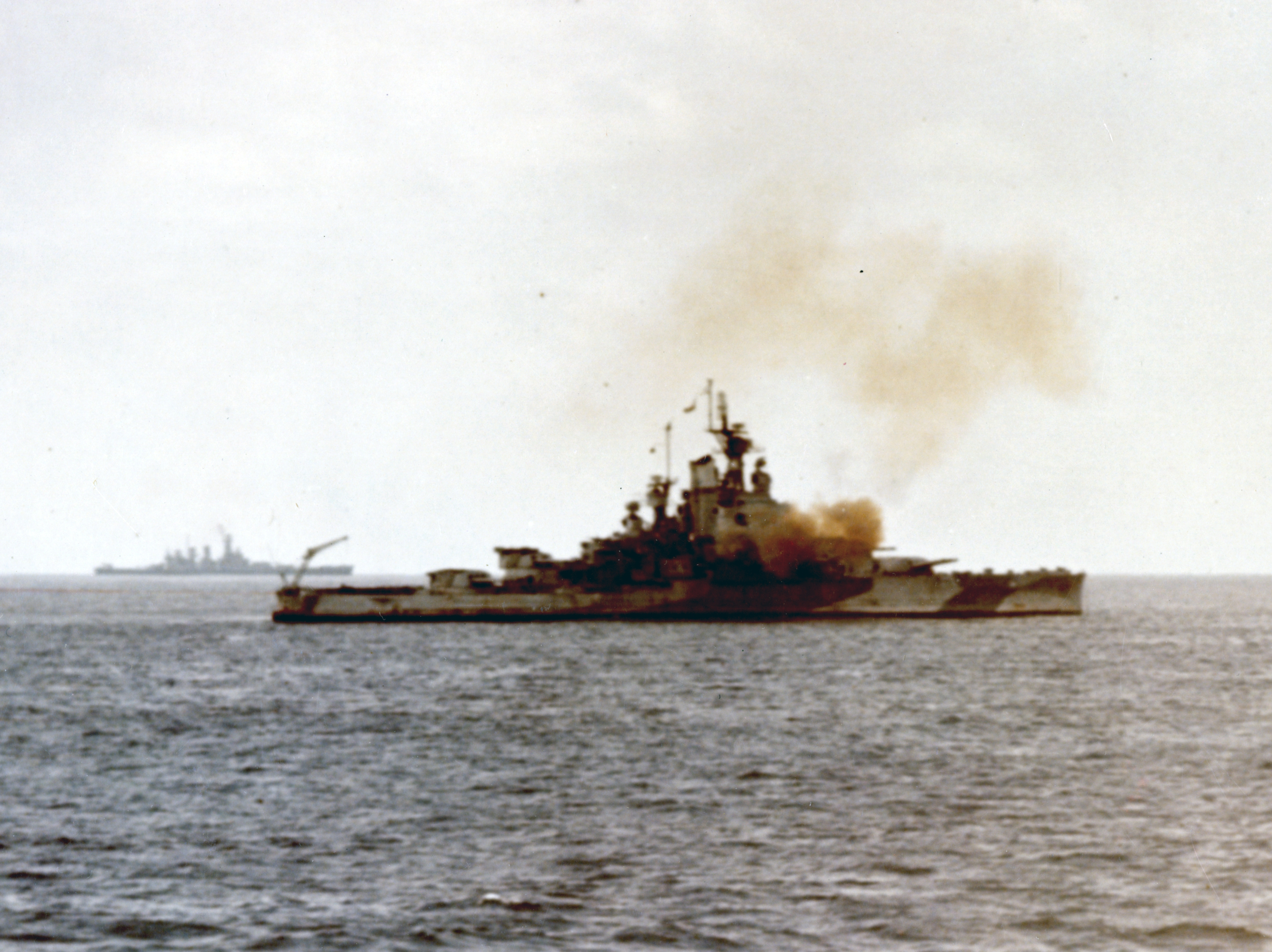
Nevada bombarding Iwo Jima in February 1945

On the morning of 7 December 1941, the Japanese aircraft carriers of the 1st Air Fleet launched a surprise attack on the American fleet in Pearl Harbor. Oklahoma was struck by three torpedoes early in the attack and quickly began to capsize before receiving six more torpedo hits. As she rolled over, her superstructure prevented her from fully inverting and she came to rest on her port side. Her crew suffered heavy casualties in the sinking, with 20 officers and 395 enlisted men killed. Nevada was hit by a single torpedo in her bow early in the attack, but she nevertheless got underway, the only battleship to do so during the attack. She was hit by between six and ten bombs as she moved through the harbor and fears that she might sink in the channel out of Pearl Harbor, thus blocking the port, led her commander to decide to beach the vessel. She suffered relatively minor casualties, with 50 killed and 109 wounded. Nevada was refloated in February 1942 and was immediately dry-docked for repairs and modernization, while Oklahoma was too seriously damaged to be returned to service; she was righted in 1943 and partially dismantled in 1944 before being sold for scrap in 1946. While being towed from Pearl Harbor to San Francisco on 17 May 1947, she slipped her towing line and sank.

After returning to service in 1943, Nevada was primarily used to support amphibious operations. She took part in the Aleutian Islands campaign in April and May, before returning to the United States for further modifications in preparation for her role as a bombardment vessel for the Normandy landings. She steamed to Britain in April 1944 to join the assault fleet, which conducted the landing on 6 June; Nevada remained off the beaches for the next eleven days to bombard German positions as the Allied soldiers fought inland, withdrawing only once to replenish ammunition. She and several other vessels from the bombardment force were sent to shell other ports in occupied France, including Cherbourg before being reassigned to the force tasked with supporting Operation Dragoon, the landing in southern France conducted on 15 August. During the landings, she shelled the remnants of the French battleship Strasbourg, scuttled in 1942, and now nothing more than a floating hull, scoring hits that inflicted further damage on the vessel.

Nevada then returned to the United States to have her badly-worn barrels relined before returning to the Pacific Fleet. She arrived in the advance base at Ulithi in January 1945 and began preparations for the next major operation, the landing at Iwo Jima the following month. She joined several other battleships for an intensive bombardment of the island for three days before the Marines went ashore on 19 February. The ship operated off the island providing fire support through 7 March, when she departed to prepare for the invasion of Okinawa. The initial bombardment began on 24 March and continued until the landing on 1 April, and Nevada remained off the island until 14 April when she was withdrawn for an overhaul. The ship returned for patrols in the East China Sea in July, though she saw no further action before the end of the war on 15 August.

Worn out after nearly thirty years of service by late 1945, she was slated for disposal in nuclear weapons tests in November 1945. She was allocated to the fleet of target ships to be used for Operation Crossroads in January 1946 and she arrived in Bikini Atoll in May. The target fleet included several other battleships, including the captured Japanese vessel Nagato. Nevada was used as the aiming point for the first test, an air-dropped bomb on 1 July, because the Navy deemed her to be the most resilient of the battleships. The bomb missed the target and inflicted minimal damage. Another test, an underwater blast, was conducted on 24 July, which also failed to sink the ship. She was taken to Pearl Harbor to be examined and was ultimately sunk off Hawaii in conventional weapon tests in 1948.
