= Davidson =

Davidson may refer to:

== People ==
- Davidson (name)
- Clan Davidson, a Highland Scottish clan
- Davidson (footballer) (born 1991), Brazilian footballer

== Places ==
=== Antarctica ===
- Cape Davidson, South Orkney Islands

=== Australia ===
- Davidson, New South Wales, Sydney
- Electoral district of Davidson, New South Wales Legislative Assembly

=== Canada ===
- Davidson, Saskatchewan
- Davidson, Quebec
- Mount Skook Davidson in the Northern Rocky Mountains in British Columbia

=== United Kingdom ===
- Davidson's Mains, a suburb in Edinburgh, Scotland

=== United States ===
- Davidson, North Carolina
- Davidson, Oklahoma
- Davidson County, North Carolina
- Davidson County, Tennessee
- Davidson Lake, a lake in Minnesota
- Mount Davidson (California)
- Davidson Seamount, undersea mountain southwest of Monterey, California
- Davidson Township, Sullivan County, Pennsylvania
- Davidson Township, Iredell County, North Carolina

== Groups, companies, organizations ==
- Davidson's, U.S. menswear chain
- Davidson Media Group, U.S. broadcaster
- Davidson & Associates, a defunct video game publisher
- Davidson Brothers, Australian bluegrass duo

=== Education ===
- Davidson Institute for Talent Development, a US-based nationwide nonprofit organization established to support the needs of profoundly gifted children
- Davidson Wildcats, the athletic program of Davidson College
- Davidson High School (disambiguation)
- Davidson Academy, Tennessee, USA
- Davidson Academy of Nevada, USA
- Davidson College, North Carolina, USA
- Davidson High School (New South Wales), Sydney, Australia

== Facilities and structures ==
- Davidson House (disambiguation)
- Davidson's Fort, Old Fort, North Carolina, USA; an American War of Independence fort
- Tyler Davidson Fountain, monument in Cincinnati, Ohio, USA

== Other uses ==
- Rollo Davidson Prize, of Churchill College, Cambridge, England, UK
- USS Davidson, US Navy Frigate FF1045
- Davidson's penstemon (Penstemon davidsonii), species of Penstemon
- Davidson's plum (Davidsonia), a genus of plants endemic to Australia

== See also ==
- Davidson County (disambiguation)
- Son of David (disambiguation)
- Davison (disambiguation)
- Davis (disambiguation)
- David (disambiguation)
