= Bliss-Leavitt Mark 6 torpedo =

- Type: Anti-surface ship torpedo
- Place of origin: United States

Service history
- In service: 1911–1922
- Used by: United States Navy

Production history
- Designer: Frank McDowell Leavitt
- Designed: 1911
- Manufacturer: E. W. Bliss Company
- No. built: 100

Specifications
- Mass: approximately 1800 pounds
- Length: 204 inches
- Diameter: 17.7 inches (45 centimeters)
- Effective firing range: 2000 yards
- Detonation mechanism: War Nose Mk 5 contact exploder
- Engine: Horizontal turbine
- Maximum speed: 35 knots
- Guidance system: gyroscope
- Launch platform: Destroyers and cruisers

The Bliss-Leavitt Mark 6 torpedo was a Bliss-Leavitt torpedo developed and produced by the E. W. Bliss Company in 1911. It employed a main engine that was a horizontal turbine rather than the vertical turbine used on all other Bliss-Leavitt torpedoes. The Mark 6's depth and gyro controls were also combined into one integrated unit. About 100 units were manufactured by E.W. Bliss. It was used on cruisers, destroyers and submarines of the E, F, G and H classes. The Mark 6 and all other torpedoes designed before Bliss-Leavitt Mark 7 torpedo, were considered obsolete and withdrawn from service in 1922.

== See also ==
- American 18-inch torpedo
