= Davison =

Davison may refer to:

- Davison (surname)

== Places in the United States ==
- Davison, Michigan, a suburb of Flint
- Davison Township, Michigan
- Davison Freeway, a highway in Detroit, Michigan
- Davison County, South Dakota

== Other uses ==
- Davison Design & Development, an invention promotion firm
- Davison's, department stores
- USS Davison (DD-618), a US Navy destroyer
- Davison High School, a girls' secondary school in England
- Davison Igbinosun (born 2004), American football player

== See also ==
- Davisson (disambiguation)
- Davidson (disambiguation)
