= Bliss-Leavitt Mark 9 torpedo =

- Type: Anti-surface ship torpedo
- Place of origin: United States

Service history
- In service: 1915–1945
- Used by: United States Navy
- Wars: World War II

Production history
- Designer: Frank McDowell Leavitt
- Designed: 1915
- Manufacturer: E. W. Bliss Company
- Variants: Mod 1 Mod 1B

Specifications
- Mass: 2015 pounds
- Length: 197 inches
- Diameter: 21 inches
- Effective firing range: 7000 yards
- Warhead: Mk 9, TNT
- Warhead weight: 210 pounds
- Detonation mechanism: Mk 3 Mod 2 contact exploder
- Engine: Turbine
- Maximum speed: 27 knots
- Guidance system: Gyroscope
- Launch platform: Battleships, modified for submarines

The Bliss-Leavitt Mark 9 torpedo was a Bliss-Leavitt torpedo developed and produced by the E. W. Bliss Company and the Naval Torpedo Station in Newport, Rhode Island in 1915. The Mark 9 was originally intended to be used on battleships. Before the Mark 9 could be issued, however, use of torpedoes on battleships was discontinued and Mark 9 torpedoes were placed in storage. These torpedoes were modified for deployment on R-class and S-class submarines, and used in early World War II to supplement the initial supply of Mark 14 torpedoes. Torpedo production for the U.S. Navy was terminated by the E.W. Bliss Company about 1920 after completion of the Mark 9 project.

== See also ==
- American 21-inch torpedo
