= Mark 7 torpedo =

Mark 7 torpedo may refer to:

- Bliss-Leavitt Mark 7 torpedo
- Short Mark 7 torpedo, a variant of the Bliss-Leavitt Mark 7 torpedo
