= Bliss-Leavitt Mark 2 torpedo =

- Type: Anti-surface ship torpedo
- Place of origin: United States

Service history
- In service: 1905–1922
- Used by: United States Navy

Production history
- Designer: Frank McDowell Leavitt
- Designed: 1905
- Manufacturer: E. W. Bliss Company
- Variants: Mod 1

Specifications
- Mass: approximately 1500 pounds
- Length: 197 inches (5.0 meters)
- Diameter: 21 inches (53.34 centimeters)
- Effective firing range: 3500 yards
- Warhead: wet guncotton
- Warhead weight: approximately 200 pounds
- Detonation mechanism: War Nose Mk 5 contact exploder
- Engine: Contra-rotating turbine
- Maximum speed: 26 knots
- Guidance system: gyroscope
- Launch platform: battleships, torpedo boats and cruisers

The Bliss-Leavitt Mark 2 torpedo was a Bliss-Leavitt torpedo adopted by the United States Navy for use in an anti-surface ship role after the E. W. Bliss Company of Brooklyn, New York, which had been building Whitehead torpedoes for the US Navy, began designing and manufacturing their own torpedoes in 1904. It was the first American-built torpedo to feature counter-rotating turbines, each driving a propeller. This design eliminated the unbalanced torque that contributed to the tendency of its predecessor (the Bliss-Leavitt Mark 1 torpedo) to roll.

== Characteristics ==
The design of the Bliss-Leavitt Mark 1 torpedo was revolutionary, but not without problems. The single-stage turbine engine drove a single propeller, which had a tendency to develop unbalanced torque and thus to roll in the water, affecting its accuracy. This problem was corrected by Navy Lieutenant Gregory Davison in the Mark 2 by using a twin-turbine engine driving twin propellers, thus steadying the torpedo's trajectory. The Mark 2 was a "hot-running" torpedo, propelled by heated air. About 250 units were built by E. W. Bliss for the US Navy.

The Bliss-Leavitt Mark 2 was launched from battleships, torpedo boats and cruisers.

== See also ==
- American 21-inch torpedo
