= Davisson =

Davisson may refer to:

== People ==
- Ananias Davisson (1780–1857), American singing school teacher
- Clinton Davisson (1881–1958), American physicist
- Kyle Davisson (born 1985), American football player
- Muriel Davisson, neuroscientist
- Richard Davisson (1922—2004), American physicist
- Walther Davisson (1885-1973), German violinist and conductor

== Places ==
- Davisson (crater), a lunar crater

== See also ==
- Davidson (disambiguation)
- Davison (disambiguation)
- Davis (disambiguation)
