= Eliphalet Williams Bliss =

American manufacturer and inventor

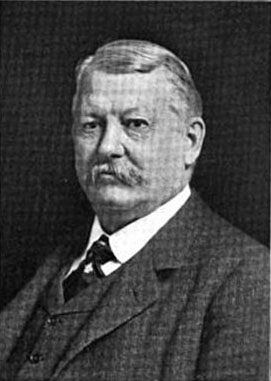
- Eliphalet Williams Bliss
- Born: Eliphalet Williams Bliss; April 12, 1836; Fly Creek, New York, U.S.
- Died: July 21, 1903 (aged 67); Brooklyn, New York, U.S.
- Occupations: Founder of the E. W. Bliss Company; President of the United States Projectile Company; Vice President of the Brooklyn Heights Railroad; Director of the Brooklyn Gas Fixture Company
- Spouse: Annie Elizabeth Metcalf Bliss
- Children: Eva Metcalf Bliss Lane
- Parent(s): John Stebbins Bliss and Ruby Ann Williams Bliss

Eliphalet Williams Bliss (April 12, 1836 – July 21, 1903) was an American manufacturer and inventor who established the E. W. Bliss Company of Brooklyn, New York. His company supplied the US Navy with Whitehead and Bliss-Leavitt torpedoes, as well as projectiles for its naval guns during the Spanish–American War (in 1898), World War I (of 1914–1918) and World War II (of 1939–1945).

== Early life ==
Bliss was born on April 12, 1836, in Fly Creek, New York, United States, one of six children of physician John Stebbins Bliss and his wife, Ruby Ann Williams Bliss. The young Bliss was educated at public schools and at a seminary. He apprenticed at an Otsego County machine shop until he was twenty-one years of age. He later moved to New England and found work at the Parker gun factory in Meriden, Connecticut.

During the American Civil War he served as a corporal in Company I of the 3rd Connecticut Volunteers and saw action during the First Battle of Bull Run. One of his brothers, Lucien Wood Williams Bliss, served with the Confederate Army. After the Civil War, he returned to New York and married Anna Elizabeth Metcalf on June 19, 1865. The following year, he relocated permanently to Brooklyn, where he was employed for a time at the Campbell Printing Press Company.

== E. W. Bliss Company ==
In 1867, Bliss founded the machine shops which would become the E. W. Bliss Company. He also acquired the United States Projectile Company and the Stiles and Parker Press Company. His interest in mechanical matters diverged along two lines, the manufacture of machine tools, presses, and dies for use in sheet metal work, and the manufacture of shells and projectiles. Bliss had numerous patents taken out, many of which were his own inventions; machines for manufacturing and soldering metal cans and for shaping and casting sheet metal. Bliss' company also supplied part of the material used in building the Brooklyn Bridge.

The E. W. Bliss Company obtained rights to manufacture the Whitehead torpedo used by the US Navy, while the United States Projectile Company would later manufacture most of the shells used in its large guns. The company's experience with building the Whiteheads proved valuable in the development of the Bliss-Leavitt torpedo, which was also acquired by the US Navy.

== Other endeavors ==
Aside from owning the E. W. Bliss Company and the United States Projectile Company, Bliss was also involved in numerous other business endeavors. He was Vice President of the Brooklyn Heights Railroad, and was Director of the Brooklyn Gas Fixture Company and the Kings County Trust Company.

E. W. Bliss was a prominent member of the Peary Arctic Club, which funded the Arctic expeditions led by the explorer and U.S. naval officer Robert Peary. Peary named Bliss Bay in Greenland after him.

== Death ==
Bliss died on July 21, 1903, in Brooklyn, New York. At the time of his death, the E. W. Bliss Company's plant covered eighty-five city lots and employed 1,300 men; in 1884, it was the largest factory in the world.
