= Davidson Building =

Davidson Building may refer to:

- Davidson Building (Sioux City, Iowa), a former historic building
- Davidson Building (Hannibal, Missouri), a historic building
- Davidson Building (Washington, D.C.), a historic building
- Davidson Building, a historic building in Anaconda, Montana; see National Register of Historic Places listings in Deer Lodge County, Montana

== See also ==
- Davidson House (disambiguation)
