= Bliss-Leavitt Mark 1 torpedo =

United States Navy torpedo

- Type: Anti-surface ship torpedo
- Place of origin: United States

Service history
- In service: 1904–1922
- Used by: United States Navy

Production history
- Designer: Frank McDowell Leavitt
- Designed: 1904
- Manufacturer: E. W. Bliss Company
- No. built: 250
- Variants: Mod 1 Mod 2

Specifications
- Mass: approximately 1500 pounds
- Length: 197 inches (5.0 meters)
- Diameter: 21 inches (53.34 centimeters)
- Effective firing range: 4000 yards
- Warhead: wet guncotton
- Warhead weight: approximately 200 pounds
- Detonation mechanism: War Nose Mk 1 contact exploder
- Engine: Single, vertical turbine
- Maximum speed: 27 knots
- Guidance system: gyroscope
- Launch platform: battleships, torpedo boats and cruisers

The Bliss-Leavitt Mark 1 torpedo was a Bliss-Leavitt torpedo adopted by the United States Navy for use in an anti-surface ship role after the E. W. Bliss Company of Brooklyn, New York, which had been building Whitehead torpedoes for the US Navy, began designing and manufacturing their own torpedoes in 1904.

== Characteristics ==
The air flask pressure of the Bliss-Leavitt Mark 1 was 2,250 pounds per square inch (15,500 kPa); the earlier Whitehead models had a lower flask pressure of 1,500 psi (10,000 kPa). The air in the Mark 1 was heated by burning alcohol in a chamber upstream from the engine; the increased air flask pressure and heated air served to increase the range of the Bliss-Leavitt Mark 1 to 4,000 yards (3,700 m) at 27 knots (50 km/h; 31 mph). However, it used a single vertical turbine wheel rotating about the torpedo's longitudinal axis and driving a single propeller. This caused an unbalanced torque that was sufficient to cause the Mark 1 to have a tendency to roll.

The Bliss-Leavitt Mark 1 was launched from battleships, torpedo boats and cruisers.

== See also ==
- American 21-inch torpedo
