= Davidson House =

Davidson House may refer to:

- Davidson House (Troutman, North Carolina)
- Davidson–Smitherman House in Centreville, Alabama
- Sam Davidson House in Evening Shade, Arkansas
- Gifford-Davidson House in Elgin, Illinois
- Breechbill-Davidson House in Garrett, Indiana
- Wilbur F. Davidson House in Port Huron, Michigan
- Walter V. Davidson House in Buffalo, New York
- Clarke-Hobbs-Davidson House in Hendersonville, North Carolina
- Benjamin W. Davidson House in Huntersville, North Carolina
- Davidson–Childs House in Hood River, Oregon
- Davidson House in Shreveport, Louisiana; see National Register of Historic Places listings in Caddo Parish, Louisiana
- Davidson House in Steilacoom, Washington; see National Register of Historic Places listings in Pierce County, Washington
- G. W. Davidson House and Bank in Auburn, Kentucky; see National Register of Historic Places listings in Logan County, Kentucky
- A. C. Davidson House in Bowling Green, Kentucky; see National Register of Historic Places listings in Warren County, Kentucky
- Sherwood-Davidson and Buckingham Houses in Newark, Ohio; see National Register of Historic Places listings in Licking County, Ohio
- Dr. John E. and Mary D. Davidson House in Independence, Oregon; see National Register of Historic Places listings in Polk County, Oregon
- Dr. Green Davidson House in Wharton, Texas; see National Register of Historic Places listings in Wharton County, Texas
- Miller-Davidson House in Menomonee Falls, Wisconsin; see National Register of Historic Places listings in Waukesha County, Wisconsin

== See also ==
- Davidson Lake Shelter Cabin in Angoon, Alaska
- Davidson Building (disambiguation)
