= Bliss–Leavitt Mark 8 torpedo =

Anti-surface ship torpedo

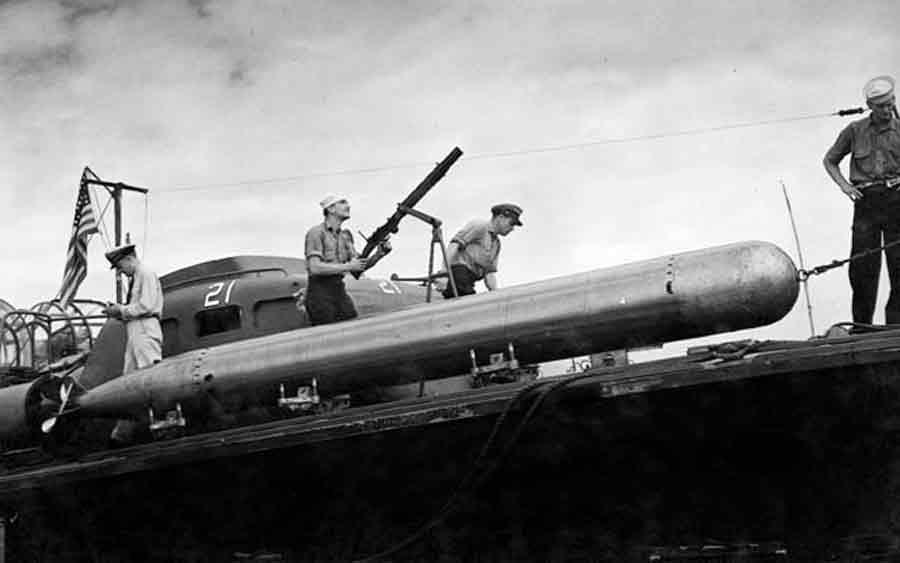
- Bliss–Leavitt Mark 8 torpedo sitting on the deck of PT 21
- Type: Anti-surface ship torpedo
- Place of origin: United States

Service history
- In service: 1911–1945
- Used by: United States Navy; Royal Navy
- Wars: World War I World War II

Production history
- Designer: Frank McDowell Leavitt
- Designed: 1911
- Manufacturer: Naval Torpedo Station; Naval Gun Factory
- Variants: Mod 1 Mod 2 Mod 2A; Mod 2B; Mod 3 Mod 3A; Mod 3B; Mod 3C; Mod 3D; Mod 5 Mod 6 Mod 8

Specifications
- Mass: 2,600 pounds (1,200 kg)
- Length: 256.3 inches (6.51 m)
- Diameter: 21 inches (530 mm)
- Maximum firing range: 16,000 yards (15,000 m)
- Warhead: TNT, Mk 8 Mod 4
- Warhead weight: 466 pounds (211 kg)
- Detonation mechanism: Mk 3 Mod 2, contact
- Engine: Turbine
- Propellant: Air (2,800 psi or 190 bar, 23.4 cu ft or 0.66 m^{3}); Water (90 US pints or 43 L); Alcohol (49 US pints or 23 L)
- Maximum speed: 36 knots (67 km/h; 41 mph)
- Guidance system: gyroscope
- Launch platform: Destroyers and PT boats

The Bliss–Leavitt Mark 8 torpedo was the United States Navy's first 21-inch (530 mm) by 21-foot (6.4 m) torpedo. Although introduced prior to World War I, most of its combat use was by PT boats in World War II. The torpedo was originally designed in 1911 by Frank McDowell Leavitt of the E. W. Bliss Company and entered full mass production in 1913 at the Naval Torpedo Station in Newport, Rhode Island. It was deployed on destroyers and battleships during World War I and cruisers built in the 1920s. All US battleships and most cruisers had their torpedo tubes removed by 1941. The Mark 8 remained in service through World War II on older destroyers, primarily the Wickes and Clemson classes. It also equipped PT boats early in World War II, but was replaced by the Mark 13 torpedo on most of these in mid-1943.

Under the Lend-Lease Act, about 600 Mark 8 torpedoes were issued to the United Kingdom for use with 50 pre-1930 destroyers it received under the Destroyers for Bases Agreement.

== Design ==
The design was originally intended to be used on destroyers in an anti-surface ship role. When it was first released, it was a highly advanced torpedo, but when it was actually deployed into service during World War II it was showing its age and unable to compete with modern torpedo technology. The low speed of the torpedo was one of the complaints; its Japanese counterpart, the Type 93 torpedo, was significantly faster and more difficult to spot in the water.

== Deployment difficulties ==
The Mark 8 had many technical difficulties with its design that would be a bane to the torpedomen who would use them. The first issue came with the process of simply launching the torpedo, which was fraught with its own set of difficulties. The gyro in the torpedo was sensitive when it was first launched and it would need to be launched from an even keel, otherwise the torpedo would lose stability when it hit the water. The other issue concerned the launching mechanism. The initial system was set with a black powder charge to push the torpedo out of the tube. This was a problem in the South Pacific, where the humid climate would cause these charges to misfire, sometimes not putting enough force behind the torpedo to fully eject it from the tube. One other risk of these misfires was what is called "hot running", where the torpedo would run in its tube. Though the warhead could not detonate, the motor would overheat and explode without water to cool it, sending splinters across the deck. Another issue was that the tubes were heavily lubricated with oil and grease to ensure that the torpedo was smoothly launched from the tube. Sometimes during launch, the charge would ignite the lubricants in the tube causing a fire emitting black smoke that would reveal the location of the torpedo boat.

The torpedo lacked the explosive power of newer models. It carried less than 500 pounds (230 kg) of TNT-based explosives, which was far from a guaranteed ship kill. This frustrated many captains who, when hitting an enemy dead on, had the warhead detonate but not sink the target, and many targets escaped.

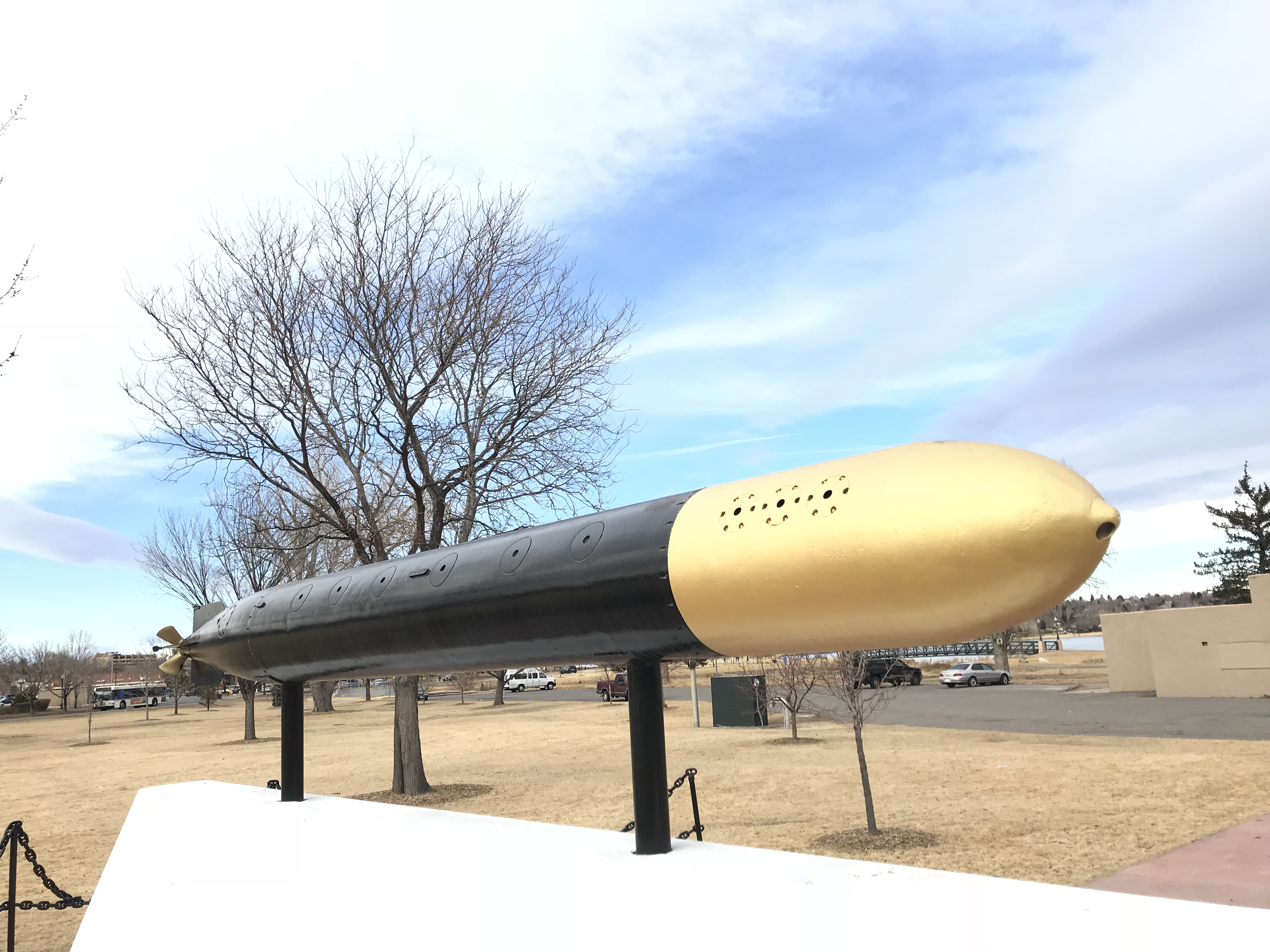
Bliss–Leavitt Mark 8 torpedo 1

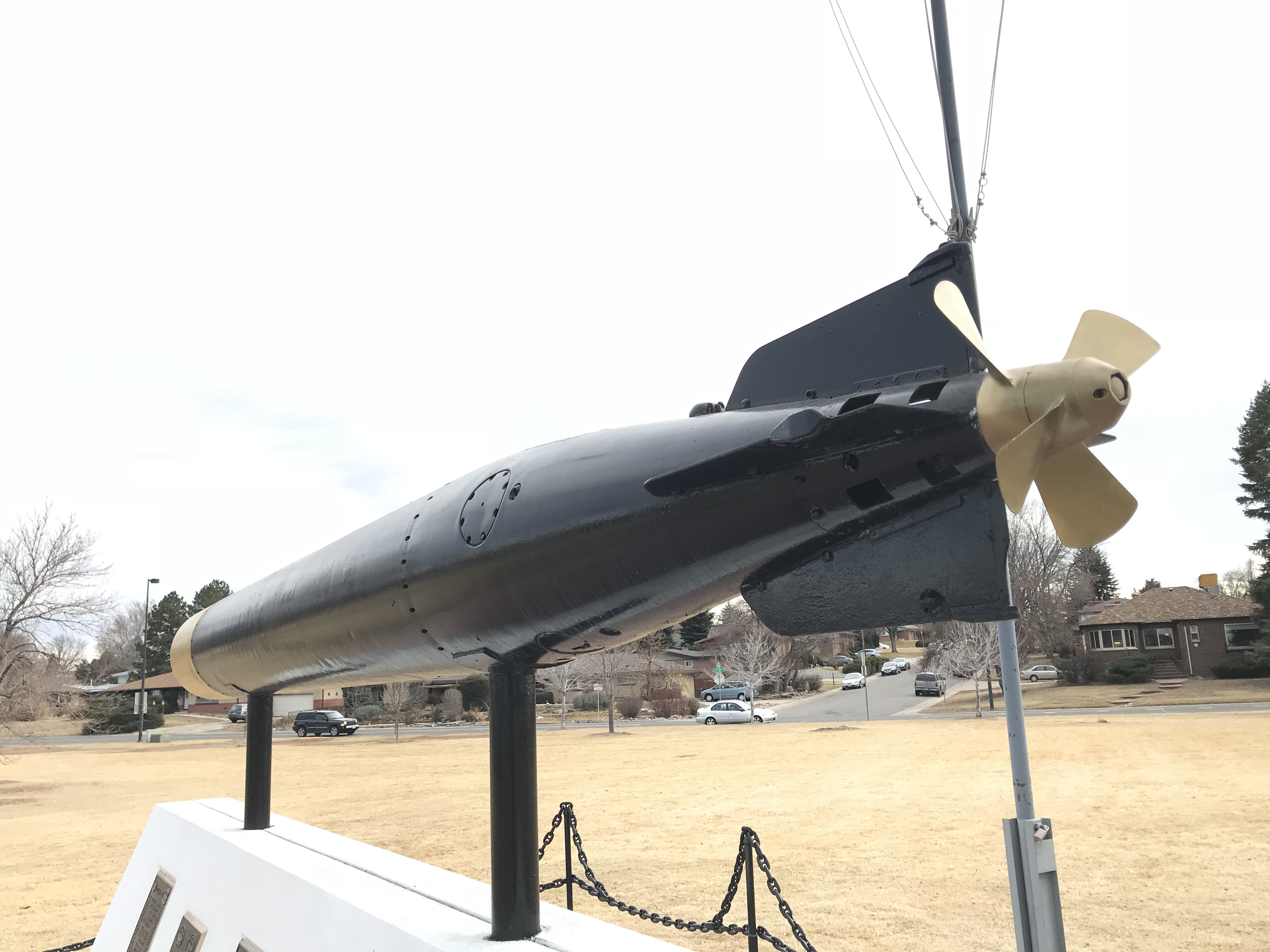
Bliss–Leavitt Mark 8 torpedo 2

== See also ==
- American 21-inch torpedo
