= Son of David =

Son of David may refer to:

- Sons of David
- Davidic line
- The Messiah
  - Jesus – see Names and titles of Jesus in the New Testament § Son of David
- A Son of David, a 1920 British film
- "Son of David" (song), a 2022 song by Ryan Ellis featuring Brandon Lake

== See also ==
- Davidson (disambiguation)
- David (disambiguation)
- Son (disambiguation)
