= Bliss (automobile) =

Defunct American motor vehicle manufacturer

Overview
- Manufacturer: E. W. Bliss Company
- Production: 1906
- Assembly: Brooklyn, New York

Body and chassis
- Class: Touring car

The Bliss was an American automobile manufactured by the E. W. Bliss Company of Brooklyn, New York, in 1906. The company was founded in 1867 and for a short duration, diversified into automobile manufacturing.

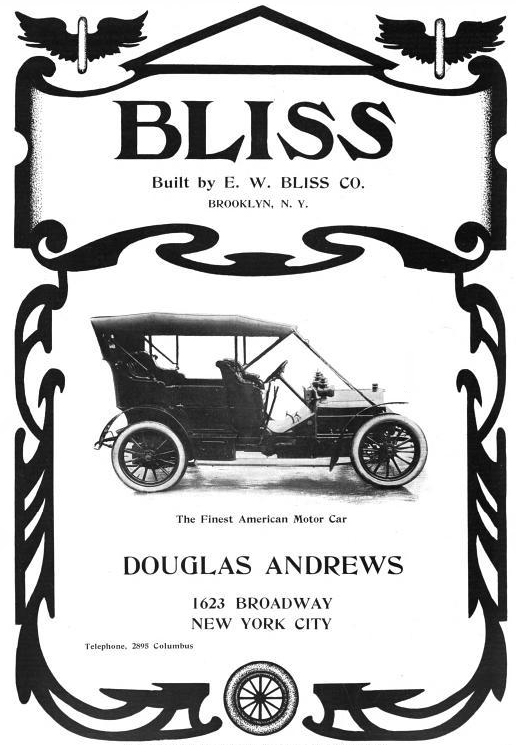
Advertisement for the Bliss automobile
