= Gregory C. Davison =

Gregory Caldwell Davison
- Born: September 12, 1871; Jefferson City, Missouri
- Died: May 7, 1935 (aged 63)
- Military career
- Allegiance: United States of America
- Branch: United States Navy
- Service years: 1892–1907
- Rank: Lieutenant Commander
- Other work: Vice President, Electric Boat; Vice President, New London Ship and Engine Company

Gregory Caldwell Davison (August 12, 1871 – May 7, 1935) was a naval officer, inventor and a Vice President of the Electric Boat Company in Groton, Connecticut.

== Biography ==
Davison was born August 12, 1871, in Jefferson City, Missouri, the son of Alexander Caldwell and Sarah Caroline Pelot Davison. He graduated from the United States Naval Academy on 27 May 1892. He served in many ships, specializing in torpedo boat operations until resigning in 1908.

A scientist as well as a naval officer, Lieutenant Commander Davison was responsible for many inventions in ordnance, torpedoes, submarines and general naval science. Retiring from the Navy on December 31, 1907, he later became Vice President of the Electric Boat Company, continuing his support of the Navy until his death on May 7, 1935.

== Marriage ==
On April 11, 1898, he married Alice Shepard, the daughter of Rear Admiral Edwin M. Shepard.

== Namesake ==
In 1942, the destroyer USS Davison (DD-618) was named in honor of Lieutenant Commander Davison. His widow, Alice Davison, was the ship's sponsor.

== See also ==
- Bliss-Leavitt torpedo
- Bliss-Leavitt Mark 2 torpedo
- USS D-3 (SS-19)
