= Davidson Lake =

Lake in the state of Minnesota, United States

- Location within Minnesota
- Location: Douglas County, Minnesota
- Coordinates: 45°58′5″N 95°45′30″W
- Type: lake

Davidson Lake is a lake in Douglas County, in the U.S. state of Minnesota.

Davidson Lake was named for D. J. Davidson, a pioneer farmer who settled there.

== See also ==
- List of lakes in Minnesota
