= Davidson Building (Hannibal, Missouri) =

- U.S. National Register of Historic Places
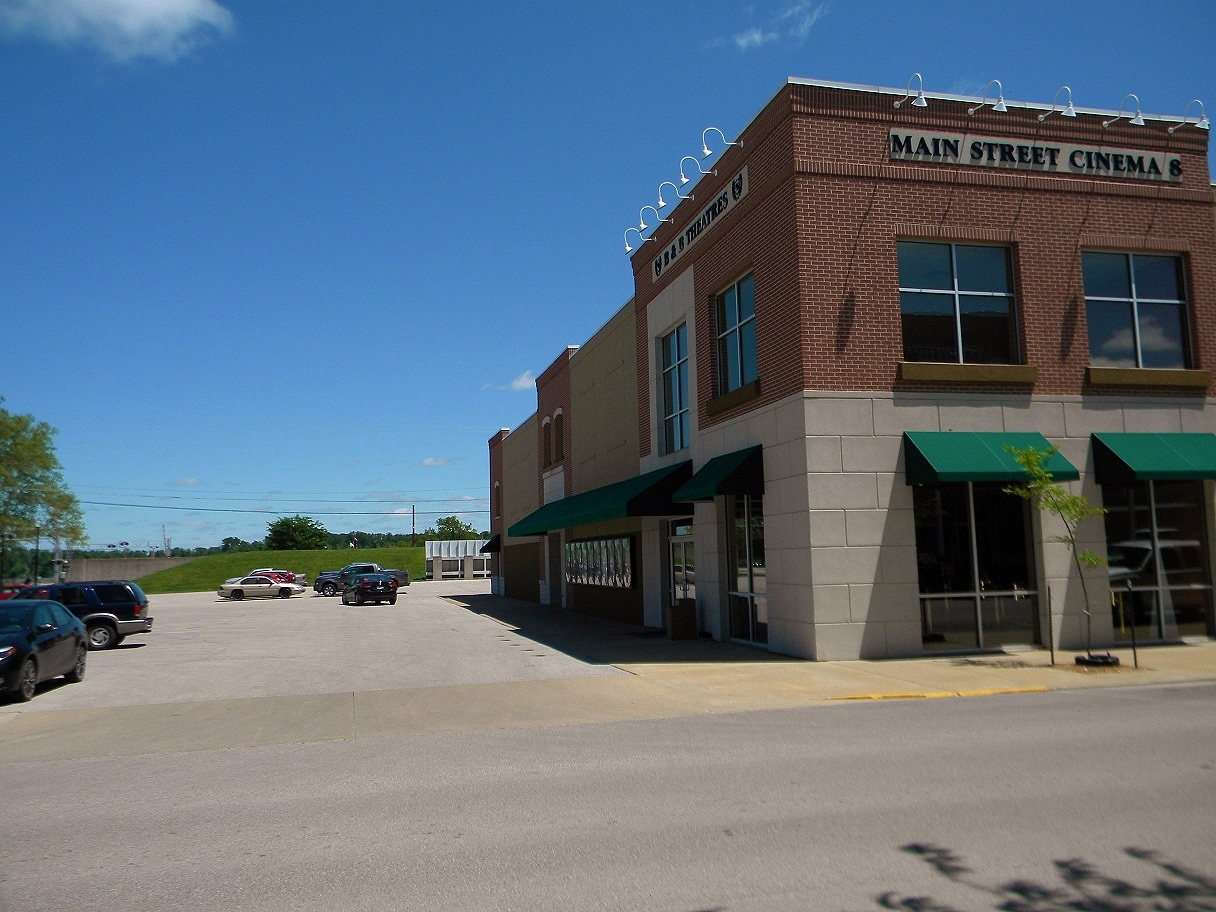
- Davidson Building site, May 2016

- Location within Missouri Location within the United States
- Location: 106 S. Main St., Hannibal, Missouri
- Coordinates: 39°42′34″N 91°21′18″W
- Area: 0.1 acres (0.040 ha)
- Built: 1903-1905
- Built by: Courtney Bros.
- Architectural style: Romanesque, Richardsonian Romanesque
- MPS: Hannibal Central Business District MRA
- NRHP reference No.: 86002130
- Added to NRHP: August 1, 1986

Davidson Building was a historic commercial building located at Hannibal, Marion County, Missouri. It was built between 1903 and 1905, and was a two-story Romanesque Revival style building. It had a three-bay rock-faced ashlar facade and party walls. It featured arched windows with radiating voussoirs. It has been demolished.

It was added to the National Register of Historic Places in 1986.
