= Davison Design & Development =

Coordinates: 40.49741°N 79.87147°W

- Formerly: Davison & Associates
- Industry: Product development
- Founded: 1989; 37 years ago
- Founder: George Davison
- Headquarters: Pittsburgh, Pennsylvania, United States

Davison Design & Development, formerly Davison & Associates is a product development company. The company is based in Pittsburgh, Pennsylvania and was founded in 1989 by George Davison.

== Business ==
Davison Design & Development provides new product development services to inventors, corporations and entrepreneurs using a nine-step process intended to bring new products and inventions to market. Davison Design & Development services include research, industrial design, virtual reality, video, animation, product prototypes, packaging, presentation to manufacturers and royalty management.

Products designed by Davison Design & Development include the Hover Creeper, Meatball Baker, Bread It breading stations, the BikeBoard, Pugz Shoes, the HydroBone for dogs and the 360° Wrist Therapy Brace. Davison Design & Development says that it produces approximately 200 prototypes per month, and its products have been sold in 1,000 retail stores and online venues. The firm has received several International Design Excellence Awards from the Industrial Designers Society of America (IDSA), formerly sponsored by I.D. Magazine and BusinessWeek, now sponsored by the Annual Design Review. In 2007, Davison Design & Development received an honorable mention in I.D. Magazine's 2007 design review competition.

== Awards ==
- Industrial design excellence award (IDEA) Silver Award for Design Strategy, Industrial Designers Society of America (IDSA), 2006: The Hover Creeper.
- IDEA Bronze Award for Medical and Scientific Products, IDSA, 2006: The BikeBoard Product Line
- IDEA Bronze Award, IDSA, 1996: Oil Filter Gripper

== Affirmative Disclosure Statements ==
In 1997, Davison Design & Development was one of eleven companies named in a Federal Trade Commission consumer protection operation called "Project Mousetrap". In 2006, Davison Design & Development were ordered to pay $26 million in consumer redress.

Davison Design & Development appealed, and ultimately settled, with the FTC in 2008, agreeing to pay $10.7 million in cash, real estate and investment assets. In keeping with the requirements of the American Inventors Protection Act of 1999, the judge set out the details of an "affirmative disclosure statement" to be issued to future clients. Such disclosure statement must specify, among other things, the number of consumers in the last five years who have made more income in royalties or sales proceeds than they paid the company.
