= Benjamin W. Davidson House =

Historic house in North Carolina, United States

- U.S. National Register of Historic Places
- Location within North Carolina Location within the United States
- Location: W of Huntersville on SR 2138, near Huntersville, North Carolina
- Coordinates: 35°23′45″N 80°52′34″W
- Area: 9.5 acres (3.8 ha)
- Built: c. 1820
- Architectural style: Georgian, Federal
- NRHP reference No.: 76001331
- Added to NRHP: April 26, 1976

Benjamin W. Davidson House, also known as Oak Lawn, is a historic plantation house located near Huntersville, Mecklenburg County, North Carolina. It was built about 1820, and is a two-story, five-bay, Georgian / Federal style frame dwelling. It has gable roof and exterior brick end chimneys. The front facade have one-story, three-bay, hipped roof porch.

It was listed on the National Register of Historic Places in 1976.
