= Wilbur F. Davidson House =

Private house and historical site

- U.S. National Register of Historic Places
- Michigan State Historic Site
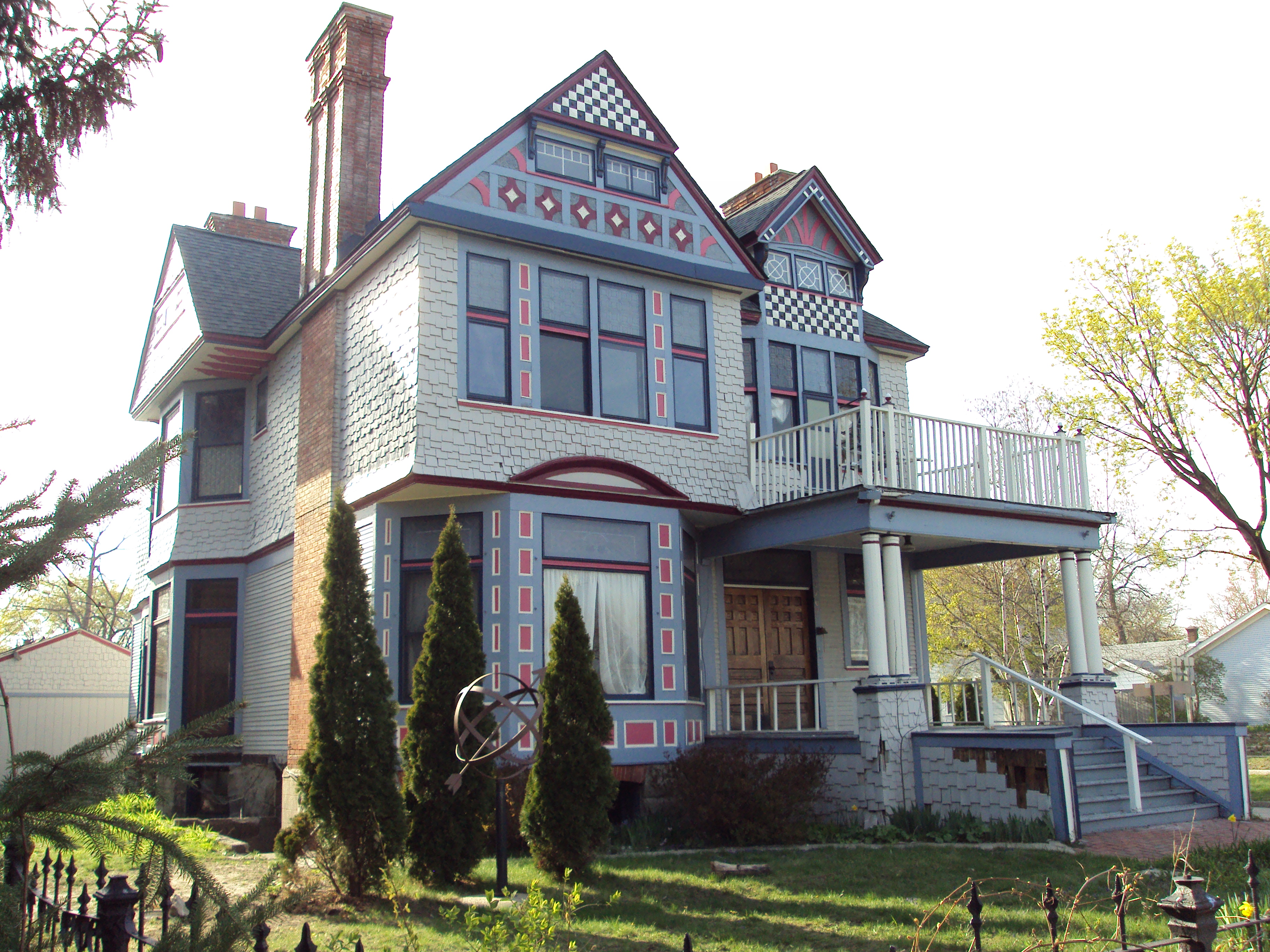

- Location within Michigan Location within the United States
- Interactive map
- Location: 1707 Military St., Port Huron, Michigan
- Coordinates: 42°57′58.5″N 82°25′30″W
- Area: less than one acre
- Built: 1890
- Architectural style: Queen Anne
- NRHP reference No.: 72001306
- Added to NRHP: October 5, 1972

The Wilbur F. Davidson House is a private house located at 1707 Military Street in Port Huron, Michigan. It was listed on the National Register of Historic Places in 1972.

== History ==
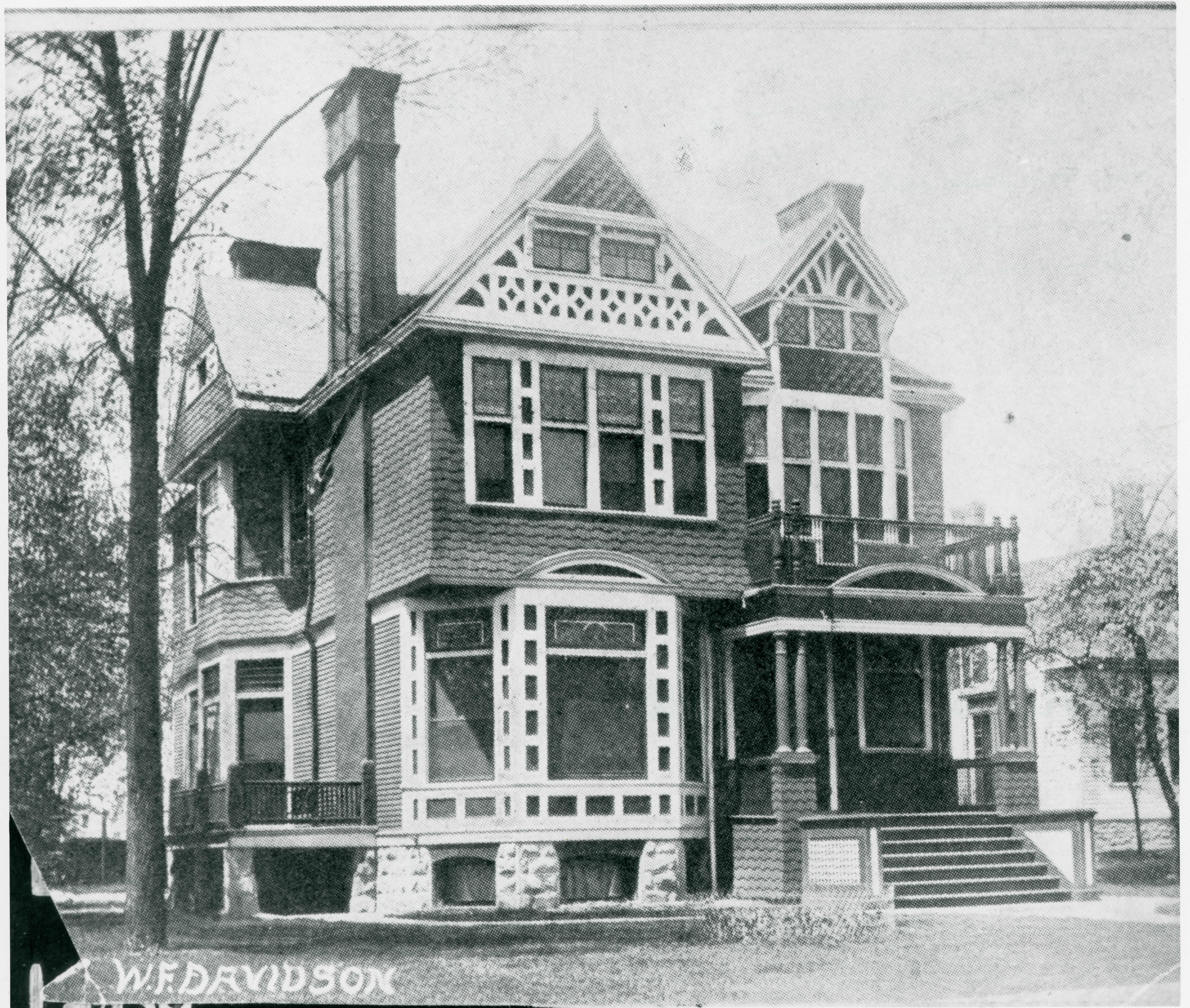
Wilbur F. Davidson House, c 1890

Wilbur F. Davidson was born in Adrian in 1852. He graduated from Howell High School in 1870, and in 1882 he opened a large dry goods store in Port Huron. In 1883 Davidson installed an electric light plant in his store. It was the first such plant in St. Clair County, and proved so successful that Davidson soon organized the Port Huron Light and Power Company, and turned his efforts from dry goods to the electricity business. Over the rest of his life, Davidson organized a number of power companies and electric railways, and branched into other real estate and financial businesses in Port Huron.

In 1890, Davidson constructed this house for his family. He lived there until his death in 1912, after which his daughter Cornelia moved in with her husband, Alfred West. They lived there until Alfred's death in 1950. Don Hampton purchased the house in 1951. In 1970, preservationists sought to restore the house, and renovations continued during the early 1970s.

== Description ==
The Wilbur F. Davidson House is a two and one-half story frame Queen Anne house. The first floor has clapboard siding, and scalloped shingles are above. Raised wood decorations on the gables creates a half-timbered effect.

It has 23 rooms, including a card room and basement billiard room. There are seven fireplaces in the house. The original trim is still extant, and includes walnut, butternut, oak, and cherry woods. The floors are hardwood throughout. The foyer is beamed and paneled, and contains a prominent staircase with serpentine balusters.
