= Davidson High School =

Davidson High School may refer to one of the following schools:

- Davidson High School (New South Wales) in Frenchs Forest, New South Wales, Australia
- Davidson High School (Saskatchewan) in Davidson, Saskatchewan, Canada
- Davidson High School (St. Joseph, Louisiana) in St. Joseph, Louisiana, United States
- Davidson High School (Mobile, Alabama) in Mobile, Alabama
- Davidson High School (Oklahoma) in Davidson, Oklahoma
- Davidson High School (Croydon, UK) in Croydon, Greater London, UK, formerly Davidson Secondary Modern School

== See also ==
- Davison High School
