= USS Davison =

Gleaves-class destroyer

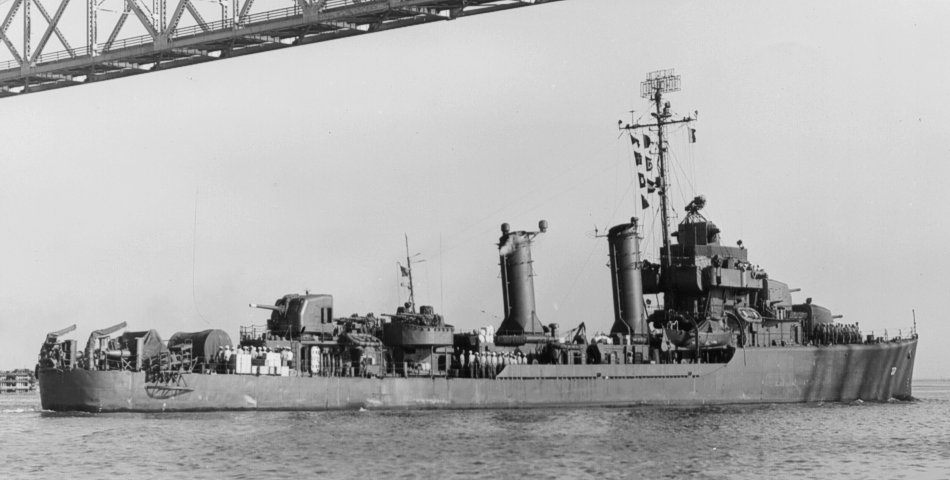
- USS Davison off Charleston Navy Yard, 28 July 1945

History

United States
- Name: Davison
- Namesake: Gregory C. Davison
- Builder: Federal Shipbuilding and Drydock Company
- Laid down: 26 February 1942
- Launched: 19 July 1942
- Commissioned: 11 September 1942
- Decommissioned: 24 June 1949
- Stricken: 15 January 1972
- Fate: Sold 27 August 1973 and; broken up for scrap

General characteristics
- Class & type: Gleaves-class destroyer
- Displacement: 1,630 tons
- Length: 348 ft 3 in (106.15 m)
- Beam: 36 ft 1 in (11.00 m)
- Draft: 11 ft 10 in (3.61 m)
- Propulsion: 50,000 shp (37,000 kW); 4 boilers; 2 propellers
- Speed: 37.4 knots (69 km/h)
- Range: 6,500 nmi (12,000 km; 7,500 mi) at 12 kn (22 km/h; 14 mph)
- Complement: 16 officers, 260 enlisted
- Armament: 5 × 5 in (127 mm) DP guns, 6 × 0.50 in (12.7 mm) guns, 6 × 20 mm AA guns, 10 × 21 in (533 mm) torpedo tubes, 2 × depth charge tracks

USS Davison (DD-618/DMS-37), a Gleaves-class destroyer, was named for Lieutenant Commander Gregory C. Davison (1871–1935). Davison specialized in torpedo boat operations.

Davison was launched on 19 July 1942 by Federal Shipbuilding and Dry Dock Co., Kearny, New Jersey; sponsored by Davison's widow, Alice Shepard Davison. The ship was commissioned on 11 September 1942.

== Service history ==
She cleared New York on 13 November 1942, screening transports carrying reinforcement troops and supplies to Safi, French Morocco between 8 December and 18 December. She returned to New York on 10 January 1943. After two more voyages to North Africa as a convoy escort between 8 February and 28 April, she sailed from Norfolk on 6 June for Oran, arriving on 22 June.

On 4 July she sortied with Task Force 85 (TF 85) for the invasion of Sicily on 10 July, acting as convoy escort and patrol vessel off the transport area until returning to Oran on 22 July. Six days later, she was en route to New York, arriving on 8 August, and sailing on 21 August for another convoy voyage to Bizerte, then sailed again on 7 October to screen a convoy by way of Belfast, Northern Ireland, to Palermo, Sicily. Davison's group came under heavy air attack from German planes based in southern France on 6 November, while off Algiers. Her crew shot down at least one enemy plane, and aided survivors of the torpedoed destroyer Beatty, and two merchantmen. She returned by way of Belfast to New York on 24 January 1944. She made two escort voyages to Northern Ireland and Scotland between 11 February and 21 April escorting convoys from Norfolk and New York to Naples, Marseille, and Oran until 7 June 1945.

On 8 June 1945, Davison reported to Charleston, South Carolina, for conversion to a high-speed minesweeper. She was reclassified DMS-37, 23 June, and her crew was trained in mine-sweeping exercises in Chesapeake Bay until 27 August. She then sailed from Norfolk for the western Pacific, arriving at Okinawa on 15 October. She swept mines in the Yellow Sea, remaining in the Far East on occupation duty until 11 March 1946 when she left Yokosuka for San Francisco, arriving the last day of the month.

Davison served in the western Pacific again from 12 September 1946 to 29 March 1947, calling at Pearl Harbor, Eniwetok, Guam, various Chinese and Korean ports, and Kwajalein. On 10 March 1948, she sailed west again, with a team from the Naval Research Laboratory for balloon tests in the Marshall Islands, returning to San Diego on 4 June. Davison was placed out of commission in reserve at San Diego on 24 June 1949.

On 15 July 1955, she was reclassified DD-618. Stricken from the Naval Vessel Register on 15 January 1972, Davison was sold on 27 August 1973 and broken up for scrap.

Davison received three battle stars for World War II service.
