= Short Mark 7 torpedo =

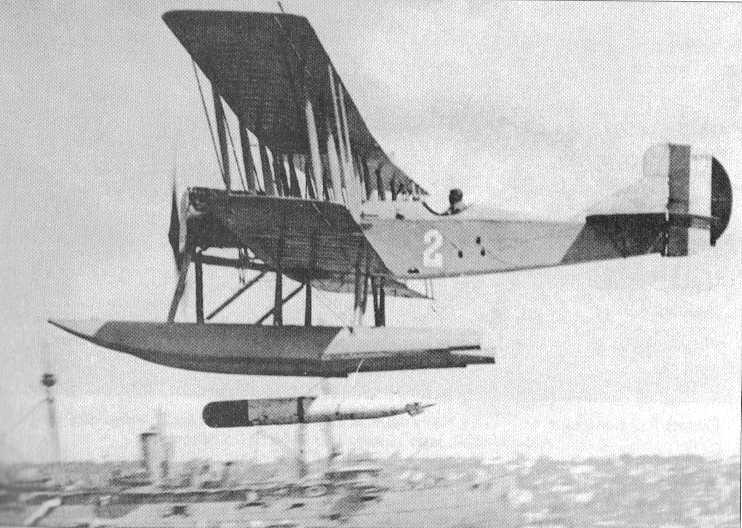
- Dummy Mark 7 Type D torpedo being dropped from a Curtis R-6L c. 1919
- Type: Torpedo
- Place of origin: United States

Service history
- Used by: United States Navy

Production history
- Designer: Washington Navy Yard
- Designed: 1917

Specifications
- Mass: 1036 pounds
- Length: 144 inches
- Diameter: 17.7 inches (45 centimeters)
- Effective firing range: 2000 yards
- Warhead weight: 281 pounds
- Detonation mechanism: Mk 3 contact exploder
- Engine: Turbine
- Maximum speed: 35 knots
- Guidance system: Gyroscope
- Launch platform: Submarines

The Short Mark 7 torpedo was a variant of the Bliss-Leavitt Mark 7 torpedo developed by the Washington Navy Yard in order to fit certain submarine torpedo tubes in 1917. The Short Mark 7, also designated Torpedo Type D, had an air flask that was shortened and a reduced warhead weight. The fuel and water tanks were relocated to obtain more air flask capacity; the fuel tank was mounted in the aft air flask bulkhead, while the water tanks were mounted in the after-body. The overall weight of the warshot torpedo was 590 pounds lighter and 58 inches shorter than the Mark 7. The air, fuel and water capacities were approximately one-third of the capacities found on the full-size Mark 7. This torpedo was never produced in quantity.

== See also ==
- American 18-inch torpedo
