= Davidson County =

Davidson County is the name of two counties in the United States:

- Davidson County, North Carolina
- Davidson County, Tennessee
