= Bliss-Leavitt torpedo =

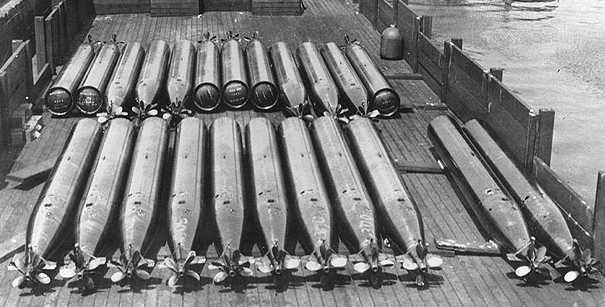
- Bliss-Leavitt 21-inch Mark 8 torpedoes intended for USS Farragut and USS Thompson c. 1925
- Type: Anti-surface ship torpedo
- Place of origin: United States

Service history
- In service: 1904–1945
- Used by: United States Navy
- Wars: World War II

Production history
- Designer: Frank McDowell Leavitt
- Designed: 1904–1915
- Manufacturer: E. W. Bliss Company
- Variants: Bliss-Leavitt Mk 1 Bliss-Leavitt Mk 2 Bliss-Leavitt Mk 3 Bliss-Leavitt Mk 4 Bliss-Leavitt Mk 6 Bliss-Leavitt Mk 7 Bliss-Leavitt Mk 8 Bliss-Leavitt Mk 9

Specifications
- Mass: 1500 lbs (Mk1)
- Length: 197 inches (Mk1)
- Diameter: 21 inches (Mk1)
- Effective firing range: 4000 yards (Mk1)
- Warhead: wet guncotton (Mk1)
- Warhead weight: 200 lbs
- Detonation mechanism: War Nose Mk 1, contact
- Engine: Turbine
- Maximum speed: 27 knots (Mk1)
- Guidance system: Gyroscope
- Launch platform: battleships, torpedo boats, cruisers, destroyers and submarines

The Bliss-Leavitt torpedo was a torpedo designed by Frank McDowell Leavitt and manufactured by the E. W. Bliss Company of Brooklyn, New York. It was put into service by the United States Navy in 1904 and variants of the design would remain in its inventory until the end of World War II.

== History ==
The E. W. Bliss Company secured manufacturing rights to the Whitehead torpedo in 1892 and thereafter supplied the US Navy with this weapon. In 1904, an engineer with E. W. Bliss, Frank M. Leavitt, designed a torpedo with a "single-stage vertical turbine engine" that utilized compressed air preheated by alcohol. This design became the Bliss-Leavitt Mark 1 torpedo, the first non-Whitehead design after the Howell torpedo.

The Mark 1 had a tendency to roll on its axis, affecting its directional stability. This was remedied by Lieutenant Gregory C. Davison who proposed a two-stage turbine design that drove contra-rotating propellers. This cancelled the torque effect of the single-stage design, improving directional stability. All Bliss-Leavitt variants after the Mark 1 would carry this design feature.

E. W. Bliss ceased production of the Bliss-Leavitt torpedo during the 1920s after the completion of the Mark 9 project.

== Design ==
Previous torpedoes were driven by radial engines powered by compressed air. Leavitt's idea was to use steam turbines to drive the torpedo. In 1904 Leavitt designed a new class of torpedoes, manufactured by his employer the E. W. Bliss Company. The first model of the inventor's new torpedo was called the Bliss-Leavitt Mark 1. The weapon was powered by a single-stage, vertical turbine engine, fueled by alcohol used to heat the air before entering the engine.

The design was seen as groundbreaking in the armaments race. "New, Deadlier Torpedo", headlined The New York Times in a front-page story on the development. "Missiles Equipped with Turbine Engines the Navy's Latest Acquisition". In the story that followed, the Times noted that "the United States Government is supplying its Navy with a new engine of destruction which will be a deadly step in the evolution of modern warfare. ... The new invention is known as the Bliss-Leavitt torpedo." The new devices, the newspaper noted, would cost the government $4,000 to $6,000 apiece.

The design was revolutionary, because of their larger warheads and much longer range, but not without problems. The single-stage turbine engine drove a single propeller, which had a tendency to develop unbalanced torque and thus to roll in the water, throwing off its accuracy. The manufacturer and its inventor Leavitt corrected the problem in subsequent models of the Bliss-Leavitt torpedo by using a twin-turbine engine driving contra-rotating twin propellers, thus steadying the armament's waterborne trajectory. The Bliss-Leavitt Mark 2 and Mark 3 models of the weapon incorporated improvements to the design by Lieutenant Davison. Ultimately, the Brooklyn manufacturing company introduced a Bliss-Leavitt Mark 4 model, an 18-inch torpedo used in the torpedo boats and submarines of the era.

The E. W. Bliss Company had long enjoyed a close relationship with the United States Navy, acting as virtually the sole supplier of torpedoes. But an English competitor emerged, Robert Whitehead, and the competition between the two firms subsequently drove torpedo technology forward, resulting in a flurry of new models following the turn of the twentieth century. In short order the E. W. Bliss Company turned out its Mark 6 model, which used horizontal turbines and could be launched above-water (but with limited range of 2,000 yards). A subsequent Mark 7 was the next great leap of technology, utilizing a water spray into the engine's combustion chamber to create a steam-powered torpedo.

== Significance ==
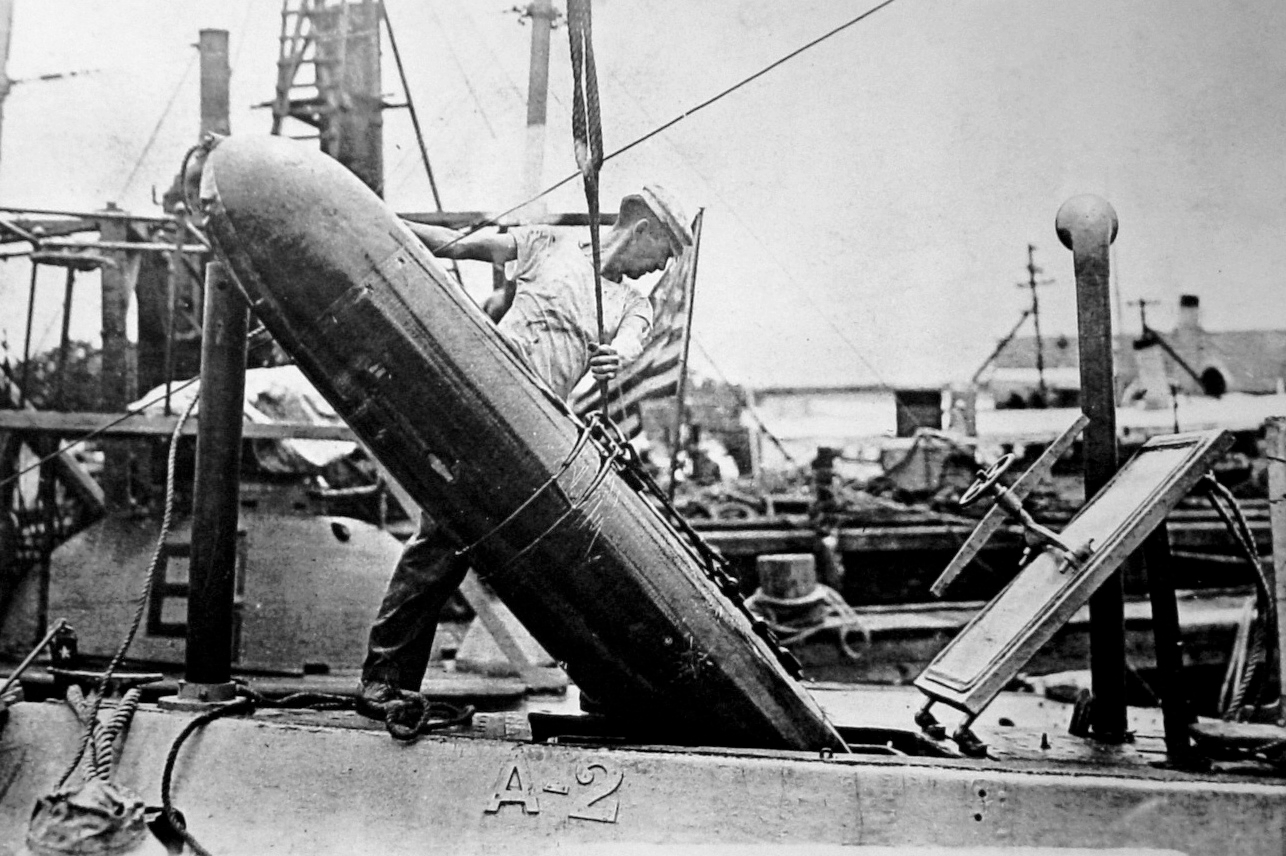
USS Adder loading a Mark 7 torpedo while on Manila Station c. 1912

"In 1912, the E. W. Bliss Company produced its finest torpedo to date, the Bliss-Leavitt Mark 7", writes Anthony Newpower in his authoritative Iron Men and Tin Fish. "This innovative design featured the use of steam, generated from water sprayed into the combustion pot along with the fuel. The resulting mixture dramatically boosted the efficiency of the torpedo, leading to markedly improved performance."

The Bliss-Leavitt Mark 7 was so cutting-edge that its design changed the face of naval warfare. Building on inventor Frank M. Leavitt's initial design, and incorporating his later improvements, the Mark 7 had a range of 6,000 yards (5,500 m) at a brisk clip of 35 knots (65 km/h; 40 mph). The torpedo carried 326 pounds (148 kg) of TNT or TPX explosive. The Bliss-Leavitt Mark 7 was introduced into the United States Navy Fleet in 1912, and the design proved so resilient and far-sighted that it remained in use for an unprecedented 33 years – up to and including service in World War II. (During World War II, the Mark 7 was used to arm reactivated World War I destroyers still carrying 18-inch torpedo tubes. Also pressed into service during the conflict was the last model of the Bliss-Leavitt, the Mark 9, and the first US torpedoes to be designed totally within the Navy without industry collaboration, the Mk 11 and Mk 12). Subsequent improvements in gyroscope technology rendered the old Bliss-Leavitt torpedoes obsolete.

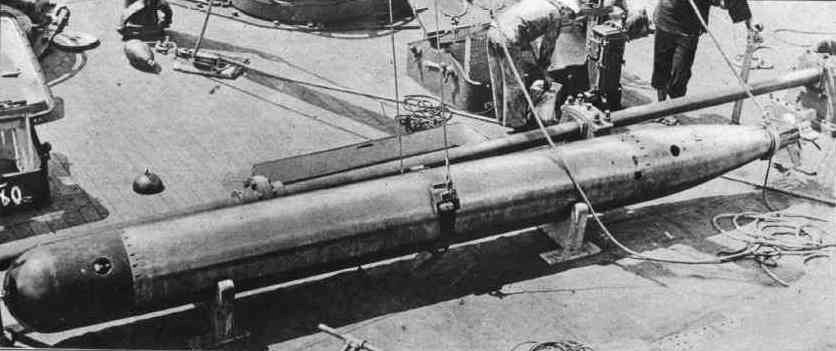
US 21-inch torpedo (probably Bliss-Leavitt Mark 7 or Mark 8) being loaded onto USS Oklahoma, c. 1919

The Navy considered the new weapon so essential to its arsenal that it sued in federal court in 1913 to prevent the E. W. Bliss Company from revealing any details of its manufacture to foreign countries. (Note: In a prior development five years earlier, a Brooklyn machinist working for the E. W. Bliss Company was arrested and charged with theft of torpedo parts with the intention to sell them to the German government. In the 1908 case, machinist William Esser was charged with the intention of stealing the technical secrets behind the weapon's design.) In its petition asking an injunction preventing company officials from telling British officials the technical details of the revolutionary torpedo, Assistant United States Attorney General Malcolm A. Coles told a U.S. District Court Judge that the court must "protect the right arm of the nation's defense" – the Navy – by granting a U.S. government request for an injunction preventing Bliss from revealing the technical specifications of the weapon to a British company.

During World War I, most United States Navy ships were still functioning chiefly as anti-submarine escorts, and the use of torpedoes as offensive weapons was limited. On May 21, 1917, the destroyer USS Ericsson reportedly fired a single torpedo at a German U-boat.

== See also ==
- Howell torpedo
- Whitehead torpedo
- Type 93 torpedo
