= Bliss-Leavitt Mark 7 torpedo =

Anti-surface ship torpedo

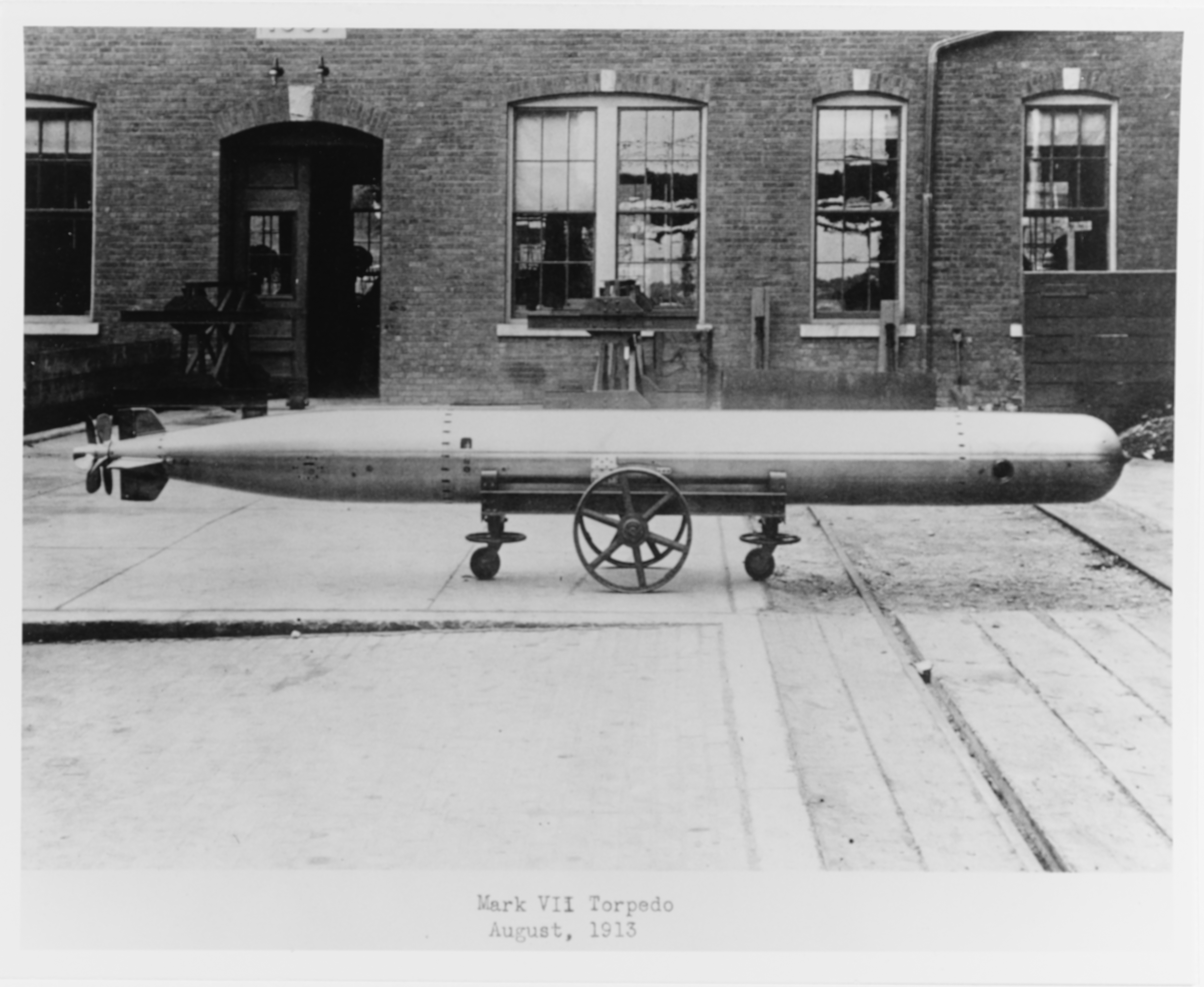
- Bliss-Leavitt Mark 7 torpedo outside the torpedo factory on Goat Island, Newport, Rhode Island, August 1913.
- Type: Anti-surface ship torpedo
- Place of origin: United States

Service history
- In service: 1912–1945
- Used by: United States Navy
- Wars: World War II

Production history
- Designer: Frank McDowell Leavitt
- Designed: 1911
- Manufacturer: E. W. Bliss Company
- No. built: 240
- Variants: Short Mark 7 torpedo Mod A Mod 2A; Mod 5A

Specifications
- Mass: 1628 pounds
- Length: 204 inches
- Diameter: 17.7 inches (45 centimeters)
- Effective firing range: 3500–6000 yards
- Warhead: Mk 7 Mod 5, TNT or Torpex
- Warhead weight: 326 pounds
- Detonation mechanism: Mk 3 Mod 1 contact exploder
- Engine: Turbine
- Maximum speed: 35 knots
- Guidance system: Gyroscope
- Launch platform: Destroyers and submarines

The Bliss-Leavitt Mark 7 torpedo was a Bliss-Leavitt torpedo developed and produced by the E. W. Bliss Company and the Naval Torpedo Station in Newport, Rhode Island in 1911.

== History ==
The Mark 7 was a major step in the evolution of the modern torpedo. This innovative design featured the use of steam, generated from water sprayed into the combustion pot along with the fuel. The resulting mixture dramatically boosted the efficiency of the torpedo, leading to markedly improved performance. The Mark 7 torpedo was issued to the US Navy fleet in 1912 and remained in service through World War II. This torpedo was also experimented on as an aircraft-launched weapon in the early 1920s. It was used on submarines of the K, L, M, N and O classes. It was also used on seven submarines of the R class (R-21 through R-27) which were decommissioned in 1924 and 1925.

After 1925, the only class of US Navy submarines armed with 18-inch torpedoes was the O class. Seven O boats, out of an original 16, were in commission during World War II. During the war, all of the O boats were stationed at the New London Submarine Base and served as training platforms. The service of the Mark 7 torpedo ended when the last O boat was decommissioned in September 1945.

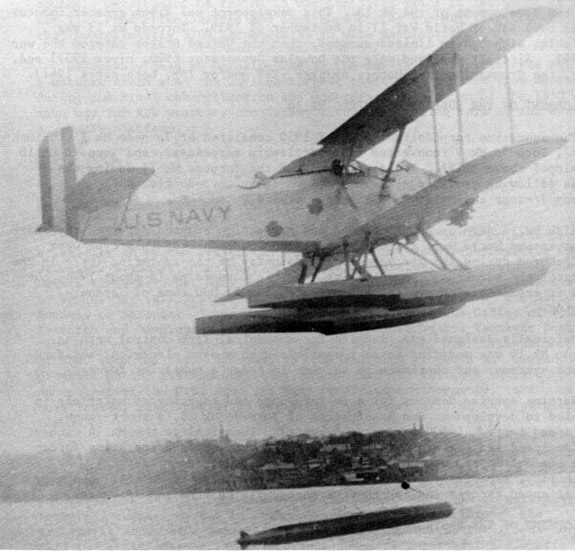
Mark 7 being dropped by a DT-2 torpedo plane during trials in the mid-1920s

== See also ==
- American 18-inch torpedo
