= Frank McDowell Leavitt =

American inventor

- Born: March 3, 1856; Athens, Ohio
- Died: August 6, 1928 (aged 72); Scarsdale, New York
- Spouse: Gertrude Goodsell
- Parent(s): John McDowell Leavitt and Bethia Brooks Leavitt
- Engineering career
- Projects: Developed the Bliss-Leavitt torpedo

Frank McDowell Leavitt (1856–1928) was an American engineer and inventor. Leavitt devised one of the earliest machines for manufacturing tin cans and later invented the Bliss-Leavitt torpedo, the chief torpedo used by United States Navy in World War I. Leavitt was part of an emerging cadre of American engineers whose design feats were putting United States manufacturing might on the map at the dawn of the twentieth century.

== Early life and career beginnings ==
Frank M. Leavitt was born at Athens, Ohio, on March 3, 1856, the son of Rev. John McDowell Leavitt, later president of Lehigh University, and his wife Bethia (Brooks) Leavitt of Cincinnati, Ohio. Leavitt married Ohio-born Gertrude Goodsell at Brooklyn, New York, on November 8, 1893, and settled in Brooklyn Heights, New York, where he pursued his career as an engineer. Within a decade of his marriage, Leavitt had patented an early – and lucrative – process to manufacture tin cans.

== Bliss-Leavitt torpedo ==
By 1904, Leavitt had turned his attention to weaponry: he began working with the civilian contracting firm E. W. Bliss Company of Brooklyn to design a new type of torpedo. The recently concluded Russian–Japanese War had caught the attention of United States Naval officials, because both nation's fleets had lost most of their battleships to underwater explosives. The race was on to perfect the deadly armaments, and the United States Navy was becoming the world leader in torpedo technology.

== Final years and legacy ==
Frank M. Leavitt, who served as chief engineer for the E. W. Bliss Company for many years, died at his home in Scarsdale, New York, on August 6, 1928. The Ohio-born inventor and his wife had no children. His sister Anna Goodrich Leavitt, who married USN Commander James C. Cresap, had a grandchild named in honor of the inventor: U.S. Navy Lieutenant Commander Frank McDowell Leavitt Davis, who graduated from the U.S. Naval Academy at Annapolis. Davis later commanded a naval torpedo bombing plane squadron in World War II, and perished while on duty in a crash off Malta in 1946. Frank McDowell Leavitt Davis is honored with a plinth at the Naval Academy cemetery, where he is interred. Frank M. L. Davis and his father, Lieutenant Ralph Otis Davis, were both assigned to the Navy submarine service.

== See also ==
- Bliss-Leavitt torpedo
- E. W. Bliss Company
- John McDowell Leavitt
