= E. W. Bliss Company =

American manufacturing company

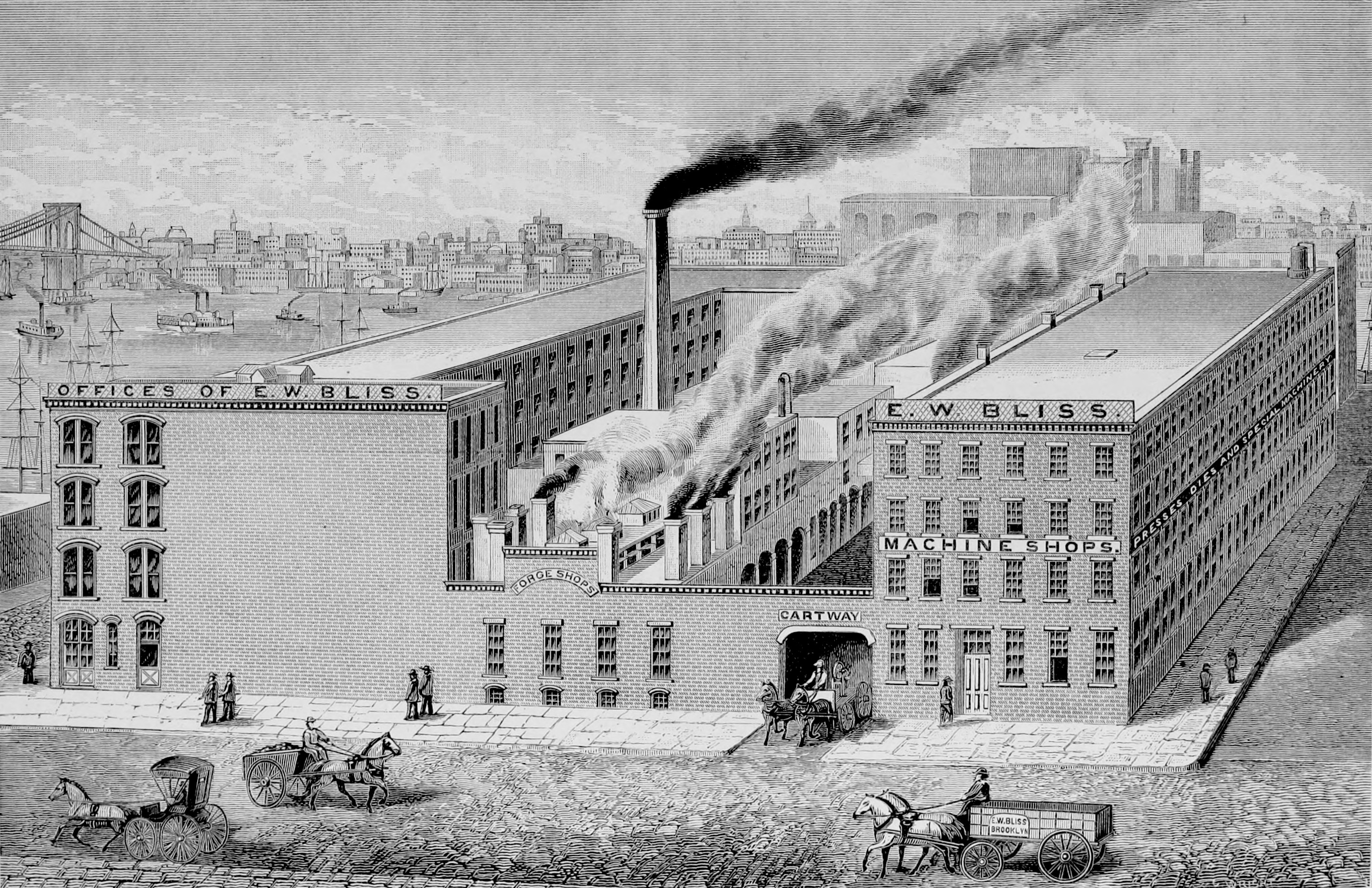
- E. W. Bliss Company plant, Dumbo, Brooklyn, 1884
- Industry: Manufacturing
- Founded: Brooklyn, New York, United States (1885)
- Founder: Eliphalet Williams Bliss
- Headquarters: Brooklyn, New York, United States
- Products: Machine tools; Munitions

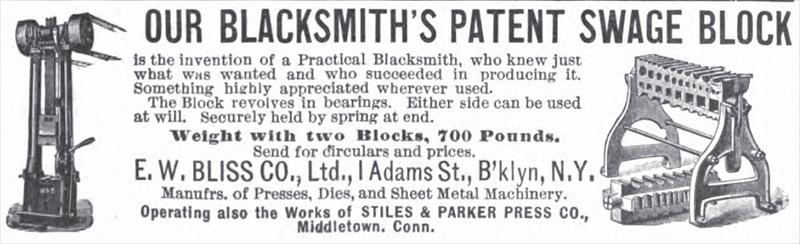
E. W. Bliss Co. advertisement for the Blacksmith's Hammer & Swage Block, 1892.

The E. W. Bliss Company was a manufacturer of machine tools founded by Eliphalet Williams Bliss. The company was based in Brooklyn, New York and relocated to Hastings, Michigan in 1919, After many years of ownership changes, the company now known as Bliss Munitions Equipment has re-established its roots in Kentwood, Michigan following a 2022 separation from ANDRITZ BCN, Inc. Bliss Munitions Equipment is the modern lineage of the E.W. Bliss Company, commissioning full-service small caliber production lines. Whereas ANDRITZ, BCN, Inc. provides services and original parts to all Bliss - Clearing and Niagara presses in the market.

== Founding ==
In 1857, Bliss formed a partnership with John Mays. Under the name of Mays & Bliss, they engaged in the machine press and die business. In 1871, Mays sold his share of the business to Bliss' cousin, J. H. Williams. Bliss later bought Williams' interest and conducted the business by himself. In 1885, Eliphalet Williams Bliss, Anna M. Bliss, and William A. Porter, Frank M. Leavitt and Charles L. Hart incorporated the business with a capital of $100,000.00 divided into 4,000 shares of $25.00 each. In 1890, the company was incorporated with a capital of $1,250,000, which was afterwards increased to $2,000,000. The company increased its holdings by buying out the business of the Stiles & Parker Press Company and the U. S. Projectile Company. In 1906, E. W. Bliss Company created the Bliss Automobile - a move to compete with current automotive trends, however the venture fell flat as market needs trended towards presses.

== Historical Products ==
The company produced a line of special presses adapted for sheet metal work, power stamping machines, automobile parts, torpedoes, shrapnel and armor-piercing projectiles. Notable among these products were the Whitehead torpedo, the Bliss-Leavitt torpedo and the Bliss automobile.

Bliss obtained defense contracts for the manufacture of torpedoes, used by the US Navy, and munitions during the Spanish–American War, World War I and World War II.

Bliss machines were often huge and very heavy, powered by steam and were sold or used by the company itself to manufacture pressed metal products. These machine tools sported names such as "Automatic Muck Bar Shear", "Gang-Slitting Machine", "Double Seamer for Flat Bottoms Machine", "Double Crank Press", "Double Eccentric Press, Geared", "Reducing Press" and "Power Press No 18 on Short Legs".

== Gulf and Western Purchase ==
E.W. Bliss went public in 1966. Following this, Gulf and Western bought the E.W. Bliss Company in 1969..

== SCAMP Production Lines ==
Developed by the U.S. Army in the 1970s–1980s at Lake City Army Ammunition Plant (LCAAP) and spearheaded by Bliss under the Gulf & Western Corporation (G&W) back in the late 1960s, the Small Caliber Ammunition Modernization Project (SCAMP) revolutionized production capabilities. U.S. small caliber ammunition production was still being manufactured on World War I technology equipment, much of it developed before World War II. SCAMP modernized small-caliber ammunition production (primarily 5.56mm, 7.62mm, and .50 caliber) by automating processes that were previously manual or semi-manual. SCAMP became a process associated with Bliss and set the U.S. Defense market ahead by increasing volume of production exponentially. Globally, some legacy SCAMP lines are still in usage today.

== Bliss Munitions Equipment ==
In 2022, the Bliss name separated from BCN Technical Services (now currently known as ANDRITZ BCN, Inc.). The separated entity is now Bliss Munitions Equipment.

Bliss Munitions Equipment is under private U.S. ownership, based in Kentwood, Michigan. Bliss Munitions Equipment serves U.S. Defense and allied countries worldwide.

The company produces modern equipment and the Bliss name is separate from ANDRITZ BCN, Inc. ANDRITZ, BCN Inc. offers OEM parts and service for Clearing, Niagara, Consolidated, Toledo, Warco, Wein, Mackay, and legacy commercial Bliss presses, but presses serving the defense market are managed by Bliss Munitions Equipment.

Its systems are centralized around high-volume, industrial production of small to medium calibers. As of 2025, the company states it has the ability to produce systems tailored for large calibers with its mid-2025 joint venture, Bliss Munitions Europe.

Bliss Munitions Equipment commissions full production lines with ancillary equipment included and individual machines, for turnkey military-spec production systems. The company's present-day equipment includes cupping, draw, and transfer presses, bullet extraction systems, automated case cut and grooving systems, and machines that automatically link or delink belted ammunition.
