= Whitehead Mark 2C torpedo =

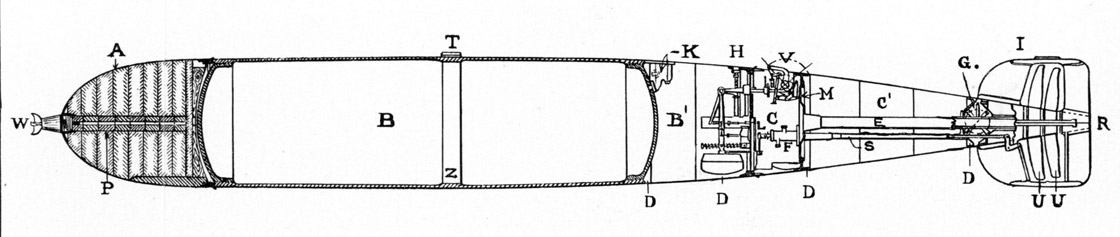
- Whitehead torpedo mechanism, published 1891
- Type: Anti-surface ship torpedo
- Place of origin: Austria-Hungary

Service history
- In service: 189?–1922
- Used by: United States Navy

Production history
- Designer: Robert Whitehead
- Designed: 1893
- Manufacturer: Torpedofabrik Whitehead & Co. E. W. Bliss Company

Specifications
- Mass: 1232 pounds
- Length: 197 inches (5.0 meters)
- Diameter: 17.7 inches (45 centimeters)
- Effective firing range: 1500 yards
- Warhead: wet guncotton
- Warhead weight: 132 pounds
- Detonation mechanism: War Nose Mk 1 contact exploder
- Engine: 3-cylinder reciprocating
- Maximum speed: 28.5 knots
- Guidance system: depth control
- Launch platform: battleships and torpedo boats

The Whitehead Mark 2C torpedo, also designated Torpedo Type C was a Whitehead torpedo adopted by the United States Navy for use in an anti-surface ship role after the E. W. Bliss Company of Brooklyn, New York secured manufacturing rights in 1892. It was probably based on the Whitehead Mark 1B, rather than a modification of the Whitehead Mark 2.

== Characteristics ==
The Type C was ordinarily assembled into three sections: the warhead, the air flask and the after-body. The warhead's charge of wet guncotton weighed 132 pounds. The Type C was what was known as a "cold-running" torpedo. The three-cylinder reciprocating engine ran on cold, compressed air which was stored in the air flask at 1500 pounds per square inch. The after-body carried the engine and the tail, which contained the propellers.

The Type C guidance component included the Pendulum-and-hydrostat control device which was called the "Whitehead Secret". This version of the Whitehead torpedo lacked the gyroscope gear designed by Ludwig Obry, which was incorporated in another Whitehead model, the Mark 3.

The Mark 2 Type C was launched from battleships and torpedo boats.

== See also ==
- American 18-inch torpedo
