= Whitehead Mark 2 torpedo =

Anti-surface ship torpedo

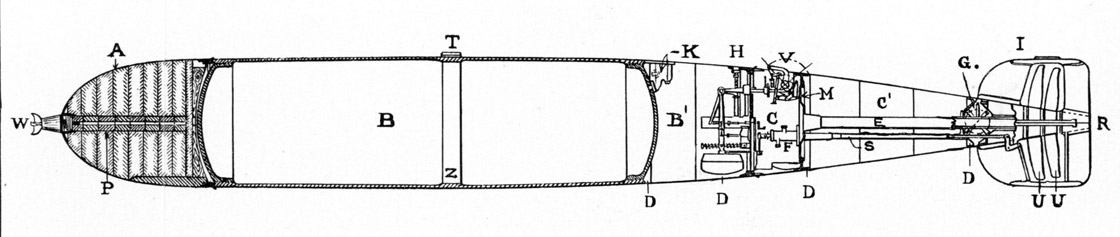
- Whitehead torpedo mechanism, published 1891
- Type: Anti-surface ship torpedo
- Place of origin: Austria-Hungary

Service history
- In service: 1896–1913
- Used by: United States Navy

Production history
- Designer: Robert Whitehead
- Designed: 1893
- Manufacturer: Torpedofabrik Whitehead & Co. E. W. Bliss Company
- Variants: Whitehead Mk 2 (Type C)

Specifications
- Mass: 845 pounds
- Length: 140 inches (3.55 meters)
- Diameter: 17.7 inches (45 centimeters)
- Effective firing range: 800 yards
- Warhead: wet guncotton
- Warhead weight: 118 lbs
- Detonation mechanism: War Nose Mk 1 contact exploder
- Engine: 3-cylinder reciprocating
- Maximum speed: 27 knots
- Guidance system: depth control
- Launch platform: battleships and torpedo boats

The Whitehead Mark 2 torpedo was a Whitehead torpedo adopted by the United States Navy for use in an anti-surface ship role after the E. W. Bliss Company of Brooklyn, New York secured manufacturing rights in 1892. It was identical to the Whitehead Mark 1 torpedo, except for some mechanical details.

== Characteristics ==
The Mark 2 was ordinarily assembled into three sections: the warhead, the air flask and the after-body. The warhead's charge of wet guncotton weighed 118 pounds. The Mark 2 was what was known as a "cold-running" torpedo. The three-cylinder reciprocating engine ran on cold, compressed air which was stored in the air flask, which had a capacity of 7.154 cubic feet at 1350 pounds per square inch. The after-body carried the engine and the tail, which contained the propellers.

The Mark 2 guidance component included the Pendulum-and-hydrostat control device which was called the "Whitehead Secret". This version of the Whitehead torpedo lacked the gyroscope gear designed by Ludwig Obry, which was incorporated in another Whitehead model, the Mark 3.

The Mark 2 was launched from battleships and torpedo boats. The first commissioned U.S. Navy submarine, USS Holland, was armed with three Mark 2 torpedoes.

== See also ==
- American 18-inch torpedo
