= Howell torpedo =

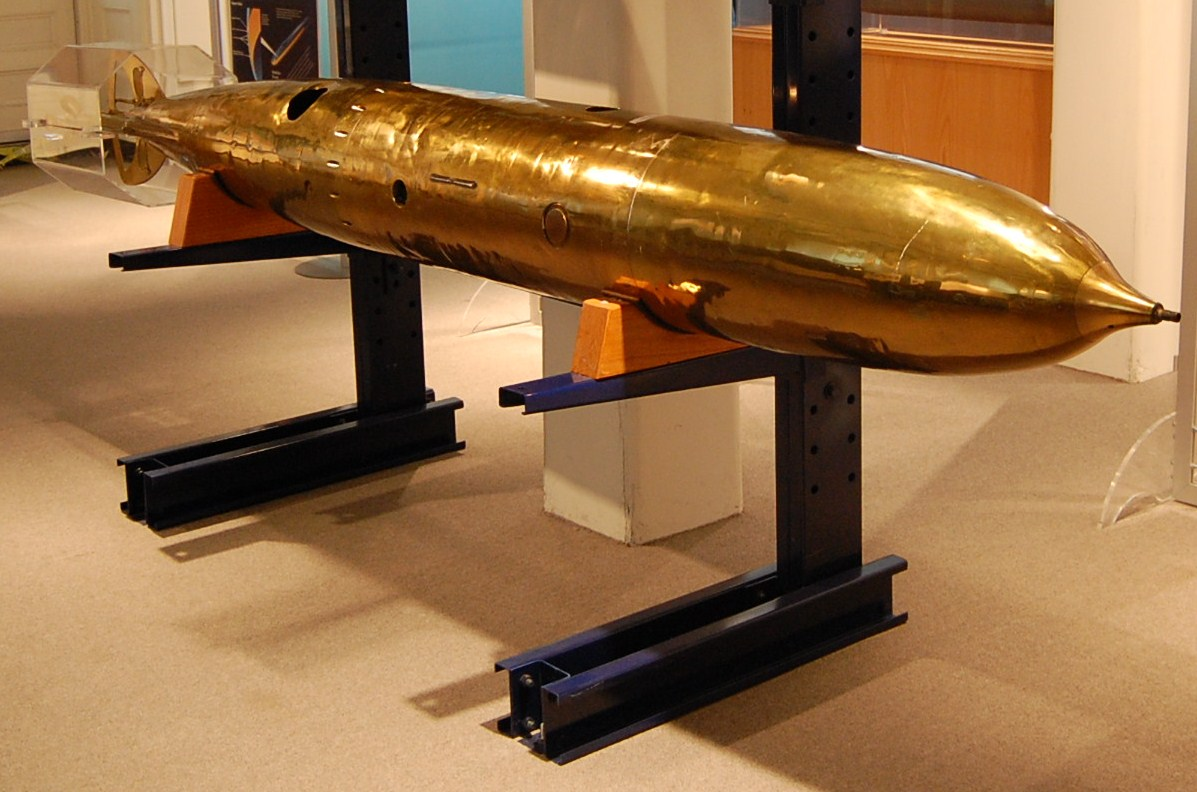
- Howell torpedo at the Naval War College Museum in Newport, Rhode Island
- Type: Anti-surface ship torpedo
- Place of origin: United States

Service history
- In service: 1890–1898
- Used by: United States Navy

Production history
- Designer: John A. Howell
- Designed: 1870
- Manufacturer: Hotchkiss Ordnance Company
- Produced: 1889
- No. built: 50 units

Specifications
- Mass: 580 lbs (263.1 kg)
- Length: 132 inches
- Diameter: 14.2 inches (335.3 cm)
- Effective firing range: 400 yards (365.8 m)
- Warhead: wet guncotton
- Warhead weight: 100 lbs (45.4 kg)
- Detonation mechanism: Contact device
- Engine: Flywheel
- Maximum speed: 25 knots
- Launch platform: Battleships and torpedo boats

The Howell Automobile Torpedo was the first self-propelled torpedo produced in quantity by the United States Navy, which referred to it as the Howell Mark I torpedo. It was conceived by Lieutenant Commander John A. Howell, United States Navy, in 1870, using a 60 kg (130 lb) flywheel spun at a very high speed (10,000 to 12,000 rpm) to store energy and drive propellers.

== Design ==
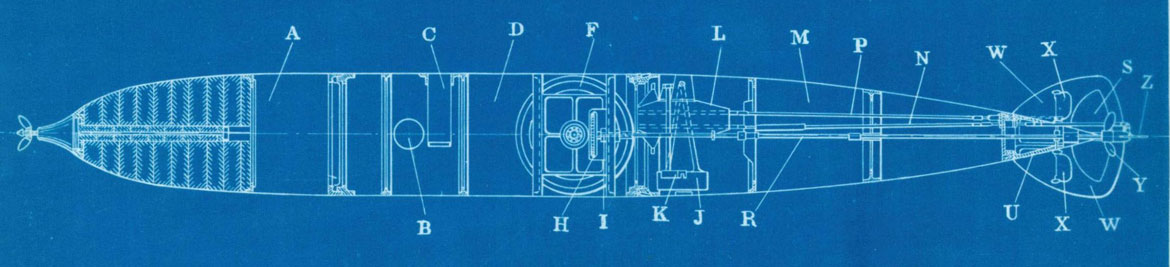
Howell torpedo's general longitudinal section from US Navy manual, 1896

Because it had no complicated engine and fuel system, the Howell was much cheaper and easier to build than its main competitor, the Whitehead. In addition, unlike the Whitehead, the Howell was wakeless, not giving away the position of the firing vessel; its flywheel was, however, very noisy. It did demand a steam turbine to "spin up" the flywheel (a complication inherent to the design). Also unlike the contemporary Whitehead, the Howell kept running in a straight line, due to the gyroscopic effect of the flywheel. A wave coming from one side would tend to roll the Howell rather than deviate it. The roll was easily corrected by the rudders. Depth control was regulated by a pendulum as in the 'secret' pioneered by Robert Whitehead. The Howell was the first torpedo to use the gyroscope effect, which Howell patented. When, in an attempt to improve directional stability, Whitehead (using a Ludwig Obry design) adopted the gyroscope in 1895, Howell sued for patent infringement.

== Production ==
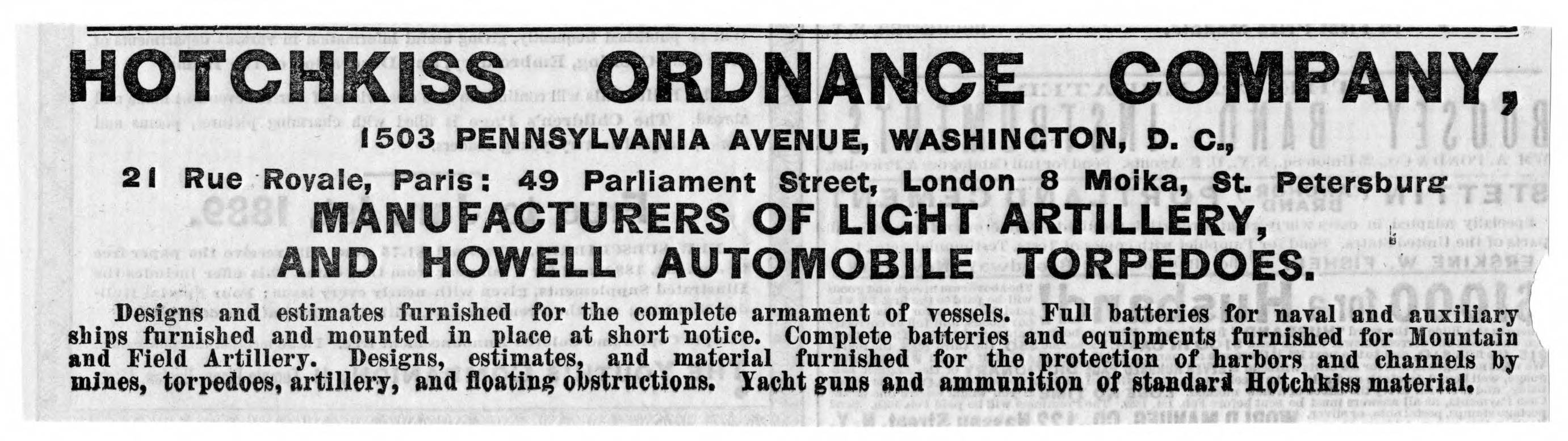
A Hotchkiss Ordnance Company advertisement for Howell torpedoes, published November 11, 1888

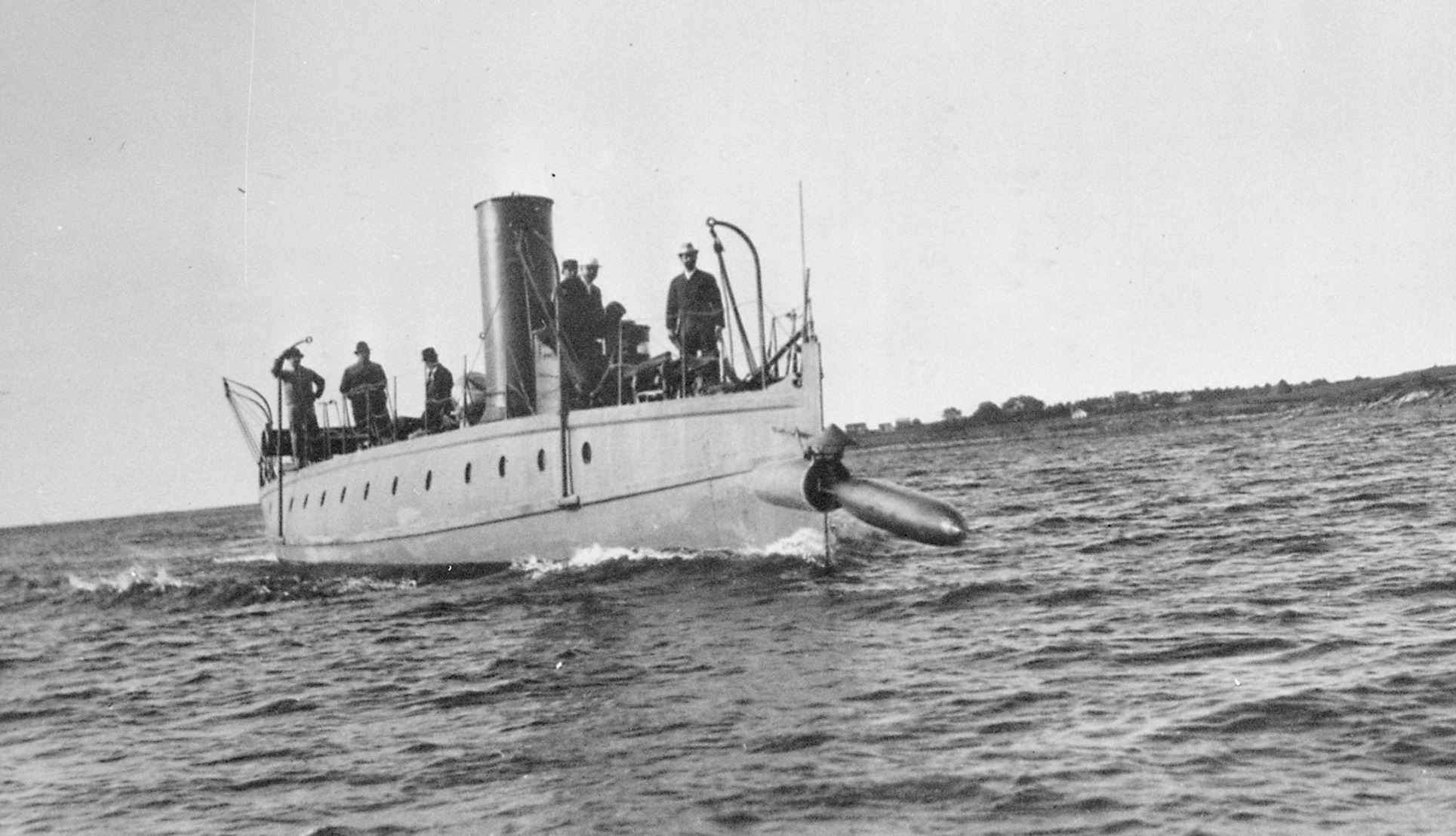
Torpedo Boat Stiletto launching a Howell torpedo, c. 1890

After very protracted development – the product of a paucity of funds, the novelty of the torpedo as a weapon, and myopia of the Navy's senior officers – fifty Howell Torpedoes Mark 1 were ordered (from Hotchkiss Ordnance Company of Providence, Rhode Island) in 1889. This was 14.2 in (36 cm) diameter, 129.75 in (330 cm) long, with a 96 lb (43.5 kg) warhead and a range of 400 yd (365 m) at 25 knots (46 km/h). Contemporary Whiteheads, built by E. W. Bliss Company, had superior performance, and greater growth capacity.

These fifty would be the only production examples, as the Howell was superseded by a rapidly improving Whitehead in 1892; as a consequence, the Howell's drawbacks were never cured. It is, therefore, impossible to know if quieting would have mitigated any loss of surprise to noise (as sometimes suggested).

A contemporary account of an operational test carried out on a Howell torpedo described its performance, where it "ran along the surface at a very fast but very regular speed for four minutes" and that there was "no horizontal deviation and the run was fully 900 yards".

== Surviving examples ==
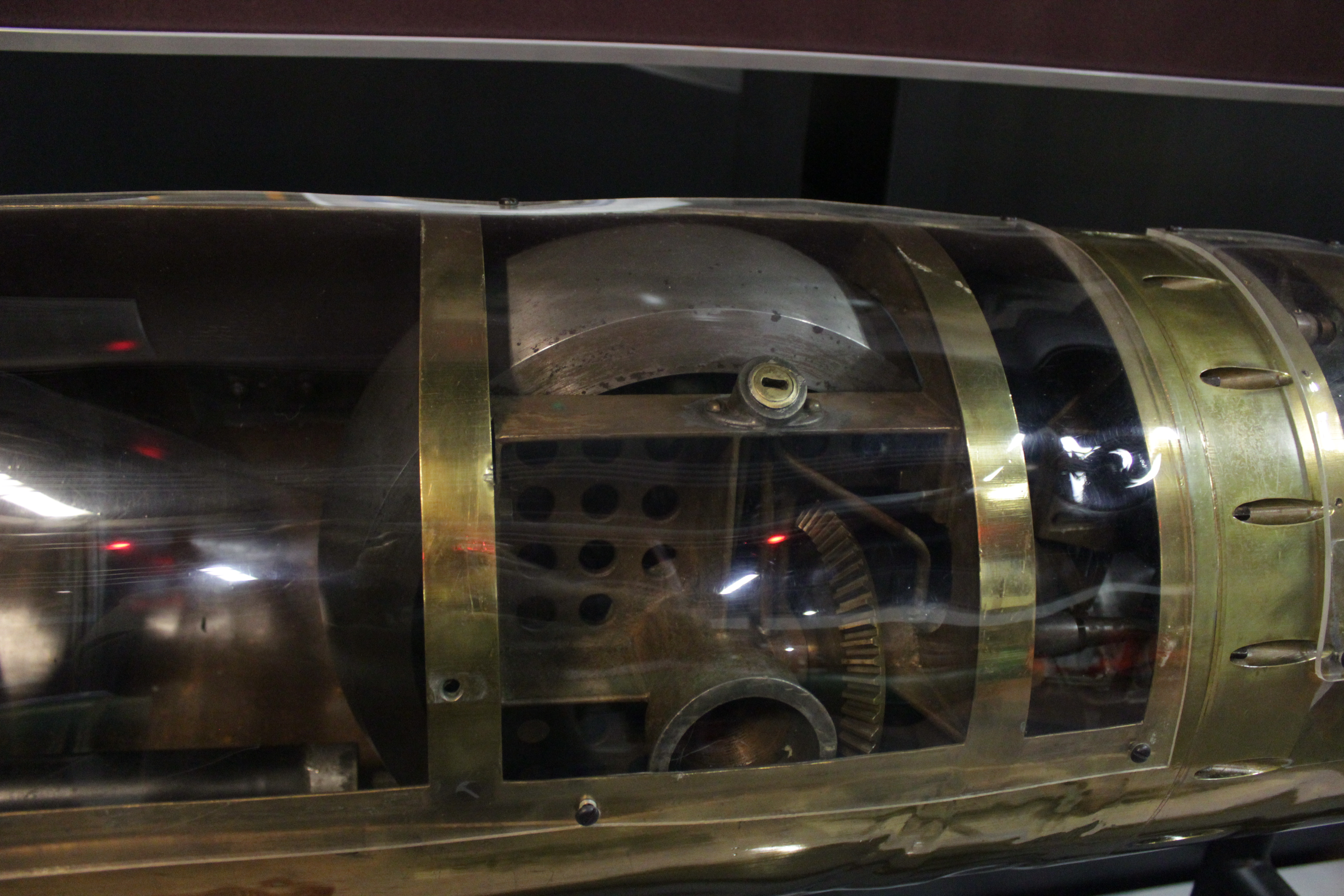
Howell torpedo flywheel

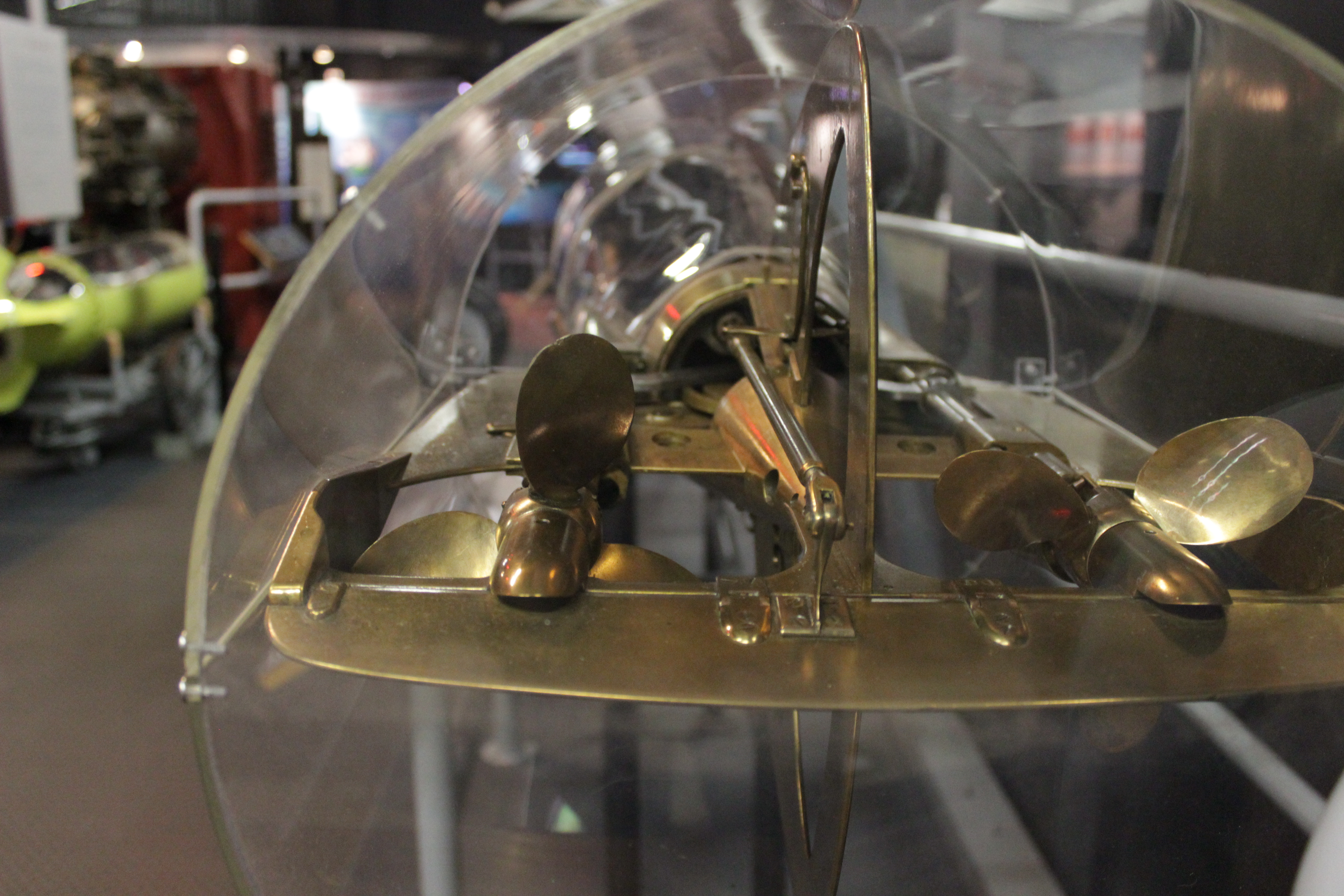
Rear view, showing the propeller

In May 2013, a Howell torpedo was discovered in two pieces on the seabed by US Navy-trained dolphins, near Coronado, California. Prior to this discovery, only two Howell torpedoes were known to exist: one at the Naval Undersea Museum and the other at the Naval War College Museum in Newport, R.I.

== See also ==
- Bliss-Leavitt torpedo
- Schwartzkopff torpedo
- Whitehead torpedo

== General and cited references ==
- Blair, Clay. Silent Victory. Philadelphia: Lippincott, 1975
- "Howell torpedo", in The Columbia Encyclopedia, Sixth Edition, online
- Fitzsimons, Bernard, general editor. "Howell", in The Encyclopedia of Twentieth Century Weapons and Warfare. London: Phoebus/BBC, 1978. Volume 13, page 1371.
- Kirby, Geoff. "A History of the Torpedo The Early Days", in The Journal of the Royal Navy Scientific Service, Vol 27 No 1.
- Milford, Frederick J. "US Navy Torpedoes--Part One: Torpedoes through the thirties", in The Submarine Review, April 1996. (a quarterly publication of the Naval Submarine League, Annandale, VA)
