= Mark 2 torpedo =

Mark 2 torpedo may refer to:

- Whitehead Mark 2 torpedo
- Whitehead Mark 2C torpedo
- Bliss-Leavitt Mark 2 torpedo
