= James McCusker =

James McCusker may refer to:

- Sir James McCusker (banker) (1913–1994), Australian financier and philanthropist
- James Harold McCusker (1940–1990), Northern Ireland Ulster Unionist Party politician
- James L. McCusker (1869–?), American swimmer
- Jim McCusker (American football) (1936–2015), American football defensive tackle
- Jim McCusker (footballer) (1939–2023), Northern Irish footballer
- Jim McCusker (trade unionist) (born 1943), Northern Ireland trade union leader
