= Whitehead Mark 1 torpedo =

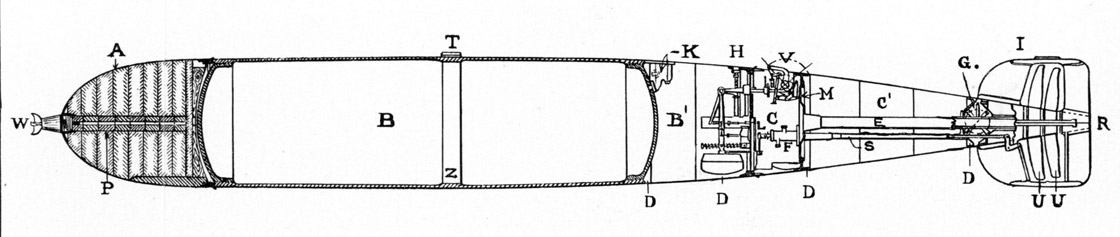
- Whitehead torpedo mechanism, published 1891
- Type: Anti-surface ship torpedo
- Place of origin: Austria-Hungary

Service history
- In service: 1894–1913
- Used by: United States Navy

Production history
- Designer: Robert Whitehead
- Designed: 1892
- Manufacturer: Torpedofabrik Whitehead & Co. E. W. Bliss Company
- No. built: 100
- Variants: Whitehead Mk 1B

Specifications
- Mass: 845 pounds
- Length: 140 inches (3.55 meters)
- Diameter: 17.7 inches (45 centimeters)
- Effective firing range: 800 yards
- Warhead: wet guncotton
- Warhead weight: 118.5 lbs
- Detonation mechanism: War Nose Mk 1 contact exploder
- Engine: 3-cylinder reciprocating
- Maximum speed: 26.5 knots
- Guidance system: depth control
- Launch platform: battleships, cruisers, and torpedo boats

The Whitehead Mark 1 torpedo was the first Whitehead torpedo adopted by the United States Navy for use in an anti-surface ship role after the E. W. Bliss Company of Brooklyn, New York secured manufacturing rights in 1892. The US Navy made an initial acquisition of 100 Mark 1s, which, by the time they entered American service, were faster, had longer range and carried a larger warhead than Robert Whitehead's earlier models.

== Characteristics ==
The Mark 1 was ordinarily assembled into three sections: the warhead, the air flask and the after-body. The warhead's charge of dry guncotton weighed 98 3/4 pounds plus 20% water. The Mark 1 was what was known as a "cold-running" torpedo. The three-cylinder reciprocating engine ran on cold, compressed air which was stored in the air flask, which had a capacity of 7.154 cubic feet at 1350 pounds per square inch. The after-body carried the engine and the tail, which contained the propellers.

The Mark 1 guidance component included the Pendulum-and-hydrostat control device which was called the "Whitehead Secret". This version of the Whitehead torpedo lacked the gyroscope gear designed by Ludwig Obry, which was incorporated in a later Whitehead model, the Mark 3.

The Mark 1 was launched from battleships and torpedo boats.

== See also ==
- Bliss-Leavitt torpedo
- Bliss-Leavitt Mark 1 torpedo
- American 18-inch torpedo
