= Whitehead torpedo =

Anti-surface ship torpedo

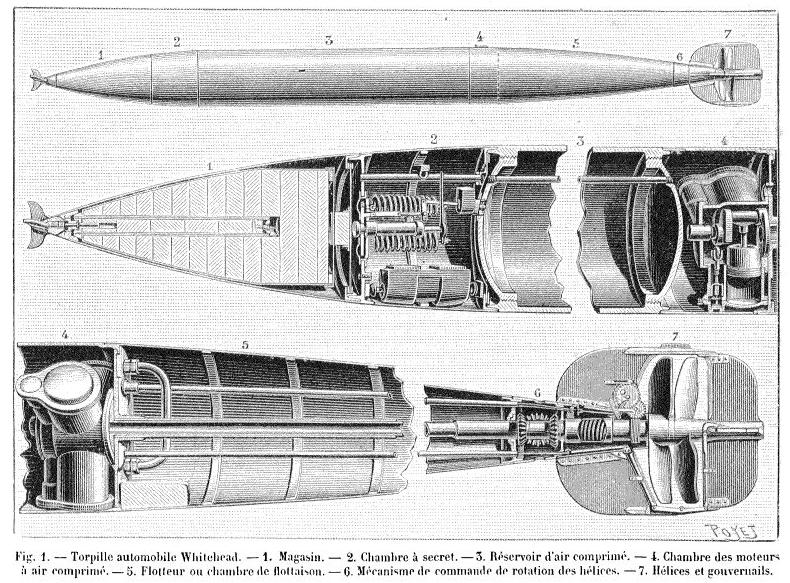
- Whitehead torpedo mechanism, published 1891
- Type: Anti-surface ship torpedo
- Place of origin: Austria-Hungary

Service history
- In service: 1894–1922 (Mk1 and Mk2); 1898–1940 (Mk3); 1910–1922 (Mk5): with United States Navy
- Used by: See § Operators
- Wars: Russo-Turkish War; Chilean Civil War of 1891; World War II

Production history
- Designer: Robert Whitehead
- Designed: 1866
- Manufacturer: Stabilimento tecnico Fiumano; Torpedofabrik Whitehead & Co. Royal Laboratories; E. W. Bliss Company
- Variants: Whitehead Mk 1 Whitehead Mk 1B; Whitehead Mk 2 Whitehead Mk 2 Type C Whitehead Mk 3 Type A Whitehead Mk 5

Specifications
- Mass: 845 lbs (Mk 1)
- Length: 140 inches (360 cm) (Mk 1)
- Diameter: 17.7 inches (45 cm) (Mk 1)
- Effective firing range: 800 yards (730 m) (Mk 1)
- Warhead: wet guncotton
- Warhead weight: 118 lb (54 kg) (Mk 1)
- Detonation mechanism: War Nose (Mk 1), contact
- Engine: 3-cylinder reciprocating
- Maximum speed: 26.5 knots (49.1 km/h) (Mk 1)
- Guidance system: depth control, gyroscope
- Launch platform: battleships, torpedo boats and submarines

The Whitehead torpedo was the first self-propelled or "locomotive" torpedo ever developed. (Note: Naval mines (which are typically static or passively mobile) were known as torpedoes when the Whitehead torpedo was developed.) It was perfected in 1866 by British engineer Robert Whitehead from a rough design conceived by Giovanni Luppis of the Austro-Hungarian Navy in Fiume. It was driven by a three-cylinder compressed-air engine invented, designed, and made by Peter Brotherhood. Many naval services procured the Whitehead torpedo during the 1870s, including the US Navy. This early torpedo proved itself in combat during the Russo-Turkish War when, on 16 January 1878, the Ottoman ship Intibah was sunk by Russian torpedo boats carrying Whiteheads, though this story has been disputed in one book.

The term "torpedo" comes from the torpedo fish, which is a type of ray that delivers an electric shock to stun its prey.

== History ==
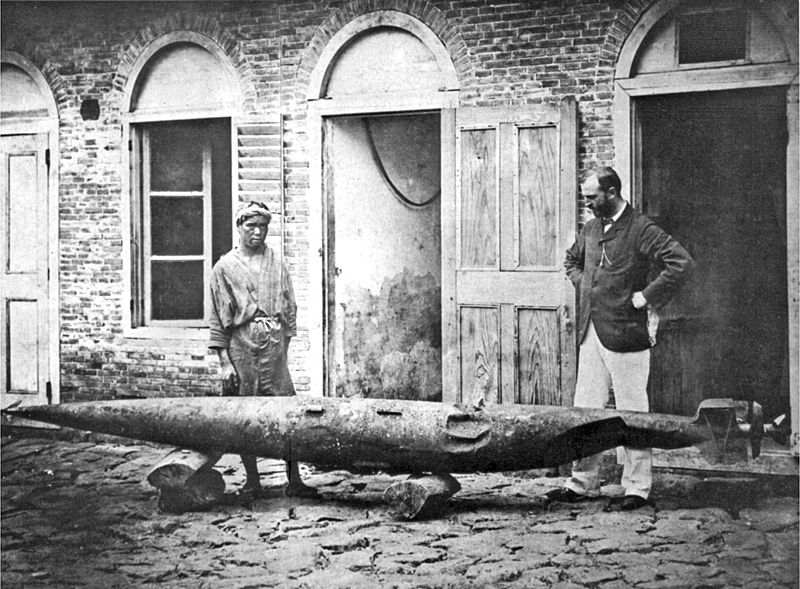
Robert Whitehead with a battered test torpedo, Fiume (modern Croatia), c.1875

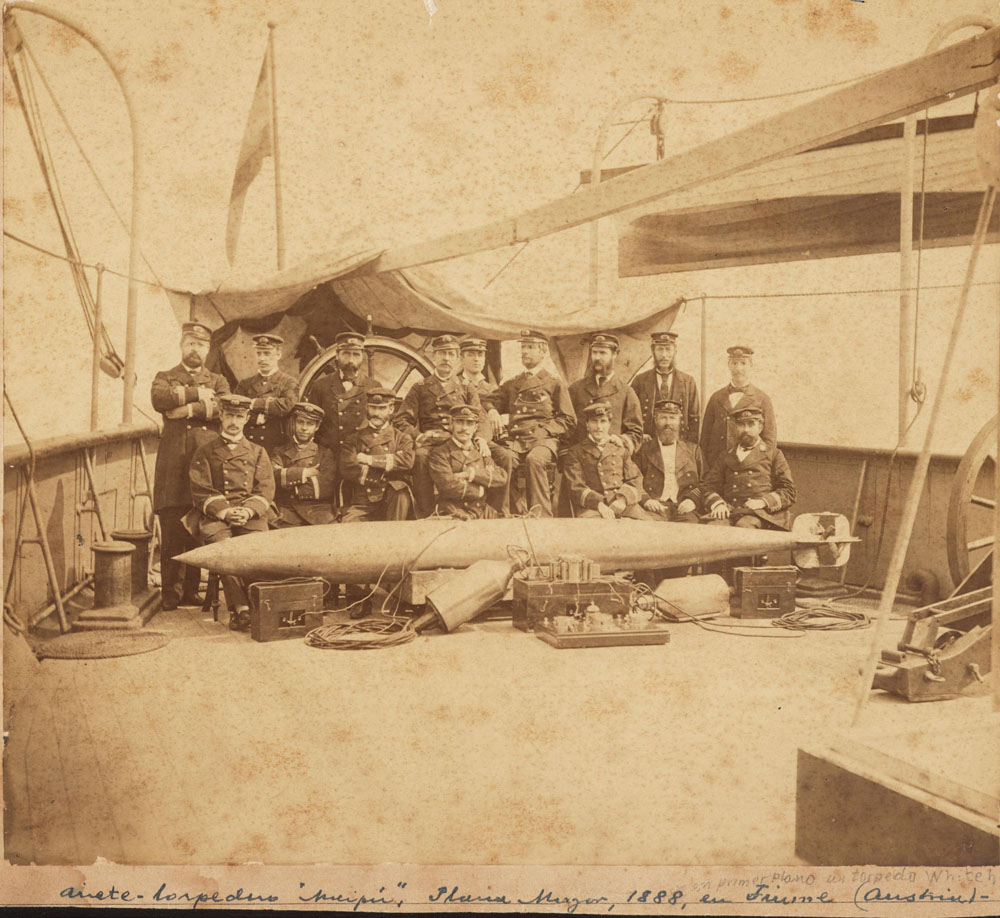
Argentinian sailors with a Whitehead torpedo, Fiume, Austria, 1888

During the 19th century, an officer of the Austrian Marine Artillery conceived the idea of using a small boat laden with explosives, propelled by a steam or an air engine and steered by cables to be used against enemy ships; his papers came into the possession of Captain Giovanni Luppis upon his death. Luppis had a model of the device built; it was powered by a spring-driven clockwork mechanism and steered remotely by cables from land. Dissatisfied with the device, which he called the "coast-saver", Luppis turned to Robert Whitehead, who then worked for Stabilimento Tecnico Fiumano, a factory in Fiume. In about 1850 the Imperial Austrian Navy asked Whitehead to develop this design into a self-propelled underwater torpedo.

Whitehead developed what he called the Minenschiff (mine ship): an 11-foot (3.4 m)-long, 14-inch (36 cm)-diameter torpedo propelled by compressed air and carrying an explosive warhead, with a speed of 7 knots (13 km/h; 8.1 mph) and the ability to hit a target up to 700 yards (640 m) away. In 1868, Whitehead introduced a solution to the stability problem for his torpedo: Pendulum-and-hydrostat control, contained in its Immersion Chamber. The Austrian Navy bought the manufacturing rights to the Whitehead torpedo in 1869. By 1870 Whitehead's torpedoes were running at 17 knots (31 km/h; 20 mph). There was still the problem of course correction (returning the torpedo to its correct course after it had deviated due to wind or wave action). The solution was the gyroscope gear, which was patented by Ludwig Obry, the rights to which was bought by Whitehead in 1896.

== Design ==
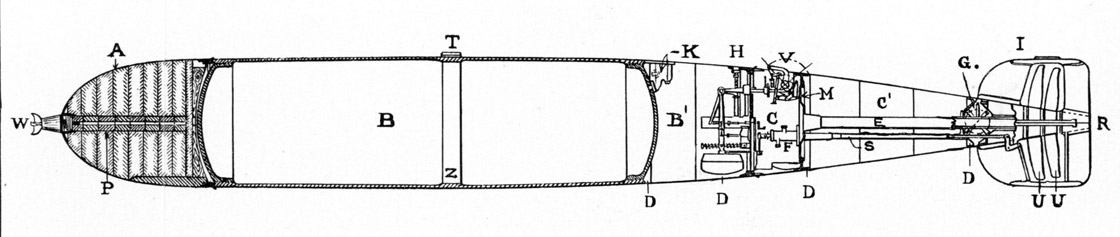
Whitehead torpedo's general profile, as illustrated in The Whitehead Torpedo manual, published by the US Navy in 1898: A. war-head B. air-flask. B'. immersion-chamber CC'. after-body C. engine-room DDDD. drain-holes E. shaft-tube F. steering-engine G. bevel-gear box H. depth-index I. tail K. charging and stop-valves L. locking-gear M. engine bed-plate P. primer-case R. rudder S. steering-rod tube T. guide-stud UU. propellers V. valve-group W. war-nose Z. strengthening-band

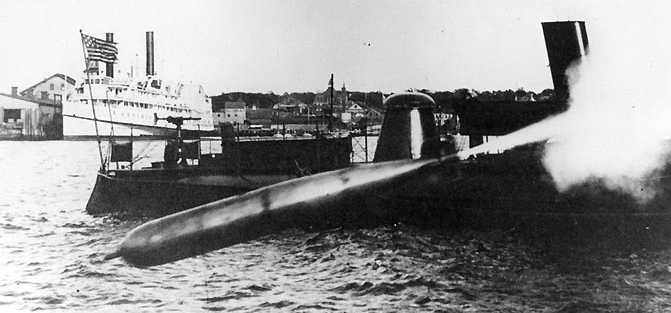
Mk3 Whitehead torpedo fired from East Dock, Goat Island, Newport Torpedo Station, Rhode Island, 1894

In 1868, Whitehead offered two types of torpedoes to the world's navies: one was eleven feet seven inches (3.53 m) in length with a diameter of 14 inches (36 cm). It weighed 346 pounds (157 kg) and carried a 40-pound (18 kg) warhead. The other was 14 feet (4.3 m) long with a 16-inch (41 cm) diameter. It weighed 650 pounds (290 kg) and carried a 60-pound (27 kg) warhead. Both models could do 8–10 knots (15–19 km/h; 9.2–11.5 mph) with a range of 200 yards (180 m).

The United States Navy started using the Whitehead torpedo in 1892 after an American company, E. W. Bliss, secured manufacturing rights. As manufactured for the US Navy, the Whitehead torpedo was divided into four sections: the head, the air flask, the after-body and the tail. The head contained the explosive charge of guncotton; the air flask contained compressed air at 1,350 pounds per square inch (9,300 kPa), or 90 atmospheres; the after-body contained the engine and the controlling mechanism, and the propellers and rudder were in the tail. The air flask was constructed from heavy forged steel. The other parts of the shell of the torpedo were made of thin sheet steel. The interior parts were generally constructed out of bronze. The torpedo was launched above or below the waterline from a tube, using air or gunpowder discharge.

== Significance ==
In 1871, the Royal Navy bought manufacturing rights, and started producing the torpedo at the Royal Laboratories at Woolwich, England. The Royal Navy fitted the Whitehead torpedo on its earliest submarines, from HMS Holland 1 onwards. The French, German, Italian, Russian navies soon followed suit and began acquiring the Whitehead torpedo. By 1877, the Whitehead torpedo was attaining speeds of 18 mph (29 km/h) with ranges of up to 830 yards (760 m).

By the 1880s, more of the world's navies acquired the Whitehead and began deploying torpedo boats to carry them into battle and engineers began to envision submarines armed with Whitehead torpedoes. In 1904, British Admiral Henry John May commented, "but for Whitehead, the submarine would remain an interesting toy and little more".

The last known operational use of a Whitehead torpedo was during the Battle of Drøbak Sound on 9 April 1940. Two torpedoes were fired from a torpedo battery in the Oslofjord at the German cruiser Blücher. This finished the ship off after it had been severely damaged by cannon fire from Oscarsborg.

== Former Operators ==
Austro-Hungarian Navy
Royal Navy
Imperial German Navy
French Navy
Regia Marina
Imperial Russian Navy
Argentine Navy
Mexican Navy
Belgian Navy
Royal Danish Navy
Hellenic Navy
Portuguese Navy
Chilean Navy
Royal Norwegian Navy
Swedish Navy
United States Navy

== Models ==
- Whitehead Mark 1 torpedo
- Whitehead Mark 1B torpedo
- Whitehead Mark 2 torpedo
- Whitehead Mark 2C torpedo
- Whitehead Mark 3 torpedo
- Whitehead Mark 5 torpedo

== See also ==
- American 18-inch torpedo
- Brennan torpedo
- Bliss-Leavitt torpedo
- Howell torpedo
- Holland Torpedo Boat Company
- Holland Torpedo Boat Station
- Schwartzkopff torpedo
- Whitehead Torpedo Works
