= Mark 1 torpedo =

Mark 1 torpedo may refer to:

- Whitehead Mark 1 torpedo
  - Whitehead Mark 1B torpedo
- Bliss-Leavitt Mark 1 torpedo
