= Schwartzkopff torpedo =

Anti-surface ship torpedo

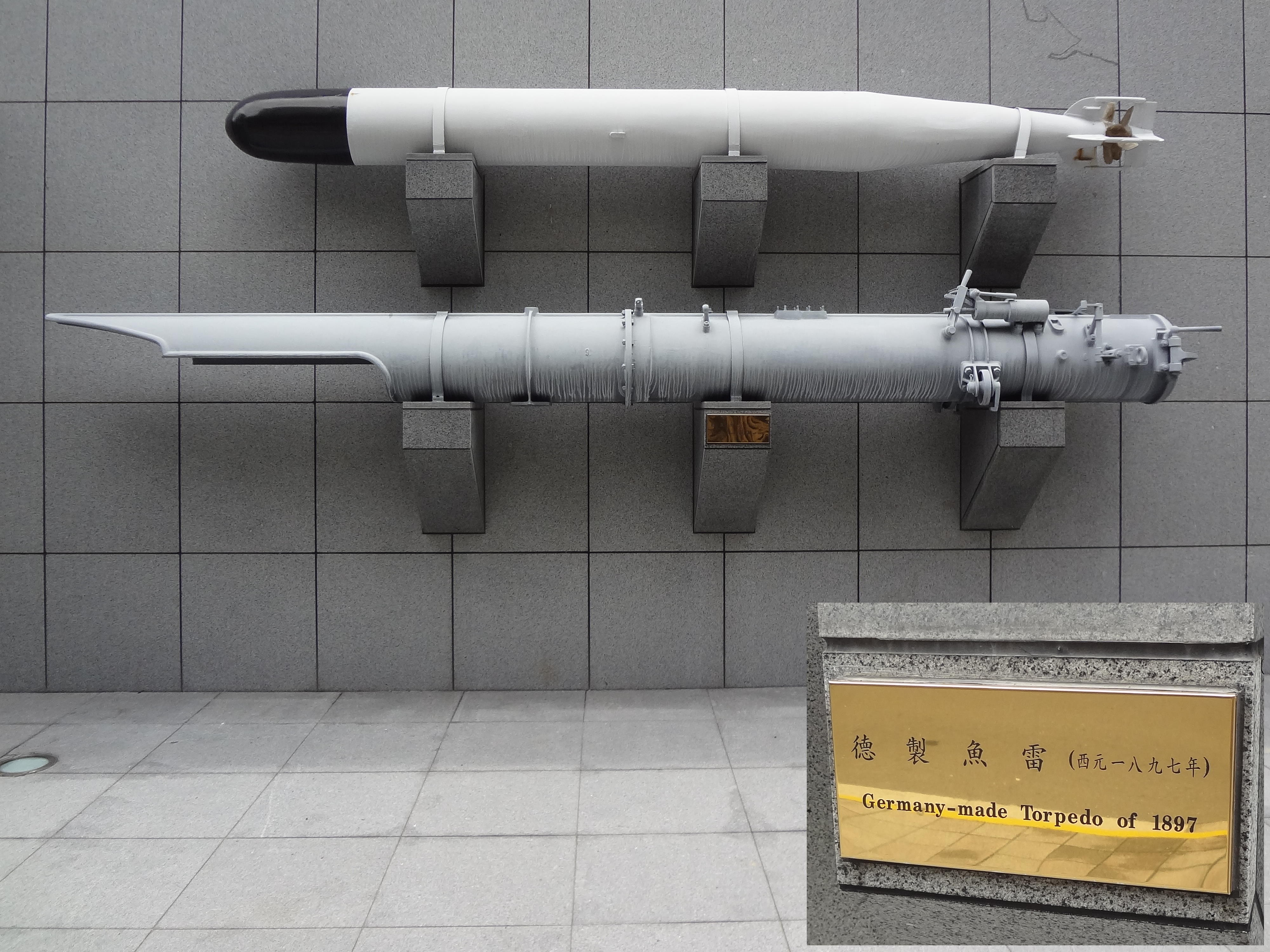
- A Schwartzkopff torpedo, model C 35/91 GA of 1897, exhibited with its launch tube at the Republic of China Armed Forces Museum.
- Type: Anti-surface ship torpedo
- Place of origin: German Empire

Service history
- Used by: United States Navy; Imperial Russian Navy; Imperial Japanese Navy; Spanish Navy; Imperial Chinese Navy
- Wars: First Sino-Japanese War; Spanish–American War

Production history
- Designed: 1873
- Manufacturer: Berliner Maschinenbau A.G. Vs Schwarzkopf

Specifications
- Mass: 616 pounds
- Length: 14 feet, 9 inches
- Diameter: 14 inches
- Effective firing range: 220-440 yards
- Warhead: guncotton
- Warhead weight: 44 pounds
- Detonation mechanism: contact
- Maximum speed: 22–25 knots
- Guidance system: depth control, gyroscope
- Launch platform: battleships and torpedo boats

The Schwartzkopff torpedo was a torpedo manufactured in the late 19th century by the German firm Eisengießerei und Maschinen-Fabrik von L. Schwartzkopff, later known as Berliner Maschinenbau, based on the Whitehead design. Unlike the Whitehead torpedo, which was manufactured out of steel, the Schwartzkopff was made out of bronze, enhancing corrosion resistance.

== Design ==
In 1866 Robert Whitehead, working on a design by Giovanni Luppis, perfected what came to be known as the Whitehead torpedo. Whitehead's Fiume torpedo works then became a meeting place for business associates and potential customers. One such visitor was Louis Victor Robert Schwartzkopff, the owner of the German firm Berliner Maschinenbau. On the last night of Schwartzkopff's visit, a disturbance had reportedly taken place in the plant's drawing room. In the morning, it was discovered that someone had broken in and stolen a set of torpedo plans. Whitehead maintained that Schwartzkopff had nothing to do with the affair. A few months after, Schwartzkopff's company unveiled a new product, the Schwartzkopff torpedo. It looked very similar to the Whitehead torpedo and in fact featured Whitehead's "Secret" pendulum-and-hydrostat control system.

== Operation ==
An 1887 Australian reporter's account of the Schwartzkopff's operation states that the weapon was launched from a torpedo boat and that it was driven by compressed air. A torpedo could be fully charged with air within 7 or 8 minutes and that this was enough to drive the torpedo for 600 yards. The explosive utilized was compressed guncotton which was fired by a detonator placed at the point of the torpedo and ignited by percussion when the torpedo hits a resisting body.

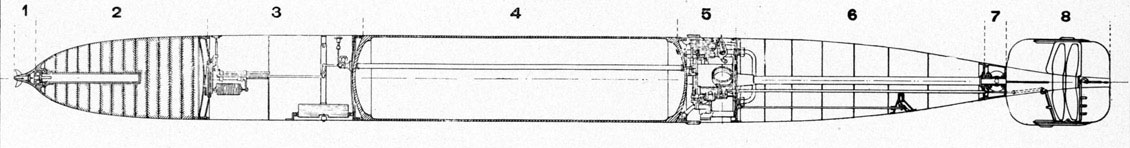
Schwartzkopff torpedo's general profile, as illustrated in The Schwartzkopff Torpedo manual, published by the US Navy in 1903: 1. War nose 2. War head 3. Immersion chamber 4. Air flask 5. Engine room 6. After body 7. Bevel gear box 8. Tail

The United States Navy purchased 12 Schwartzkopff torpedoes in 1898, this naval service's one and only acquisition of the Schwartzkopff product. As delivered to the United States Navy, the Schwartzkopff torpedo was constructed in eight sections: war nose, warhead, immersion chamber, air flask, engine room, after body, bevel gear box and tail. However, it was typically dismantled and assembled into four parts: the head, immersion chamber, air flask and after body. All the sections were manufactured out of bronze with the air flask made of a special grade to withstand the internal pressure of 90 atmospheres.

== Deployments ==
During the First Sino-Japanese War (1894–1895), both the Chinese and Japanese navies were equipped with Schwartzkopff torpedoes. The Chinese Navy had the first opportunity to employ their torpedoes during the Battle of Yalu River, but none were able to hit their targets. This poor performance was attributed to improper maintenance of the weapons by the Chinese. Five months later, during the Battle of Weihaiwei, the Japanese sent torpedo boats to attack the Chinese fleet. Firing eleven Schwartzkopff torpedoes, the Japanese managed to sink three Chinese warships. It was the most successful deployment of torpedoes at that point in history.

== Surviving examples ==
- Two Schwartzkopff torpedoes are preserved at the Naval Submarine Base New London in Groton, Connecticut. They are not at the museum, but are between the Dealey Center movie theater and the gymnasium.
- One Schwartzkopff torpedo recovered from the Spanish armored cruiser Vizcaya after the Spanish–American War is preserved at the Hampton Roads Naval Museum in Norfolk, Virginia.
- One Schwartzkopff torpedo is preserved at the Museo Marítimo Nacional in Valparaíso, Chile

== See also ==
- Whitehead torpedo
- Howell torpedo
- Bliss-Leavitt torpedo
