= Obry =

Obry is a surname. Notable people with the surname include:

- Hugues Obry (born 1973), French fencer and coach
- Ludwig Obry (1852–1942), Austrian engineer and naval officer

OBRY is the name of the former short line railway between Orangeville and Mississauga.
