= Whitehead Mark 5 torpedo =

- Type: Anti-surface ship torpedo
- Place of origin: Austria-Hungary

Service history
- In service: 1910–1922
- Used by: United States Navy

Production history
- Designer: Robert Whitehead
- Designed: 1901
- Manufacturer: Torpedofabrik Whitehead & Co. Naval Torpedo Station; Vickers Limited

Specifications
- Mass: 1452 pounds
- Length: 204 inches (5.18 meters)
- Diameter: 17.7 inches (45 centimeters)
- Effective firing range: 1000–4000 yards
- Warhead: wet guncotton
- Warhead weight: 200 pounds
- Detonation mechanism: War Nose Mk 5 contact exploder
- Engine: 4-cylinder reciprocating
- Maximum speed: 27–40 knots
- Guidance system: gyroscope
- Launch platform: battleships, torpedo boats and submarines

The Whitehead Mark 5 torpedo was a Whitehead torpedo adopted by the United States Navy for use in an anti-surface ship role in 1910. The Mark 5 was the first torpedo to be manufactured by a foreign company, the Whitehead facility in the United Kingdom, and in 1908, by the Naval Torpedo Station in Newport, Rhode Island. It was also the first torpedo to allow the firing ship to vary the torpedo's speed and range.

== Characteristics ==
The Mark 5 was a "hot-running" (powered by heated air) torpedo, as opposed to previous Whitehead designs, which were "cold-running". It was similar in performance to the Bliss-Leavitt torpedoes of that era. Around 500 units were produced by the Naval Torpedo Station and Vickers Limited. The Mark 5 had variable speed; at a high speed of 40 knots, it had a range of 1000 yards. A low speed of 27 knots allowed the weapon a range of 4000 yards; at medium speed of 36 knots, its range was 2000 yards. This variable speed was set before loading the torpedo in its tube by adjusting the reducing valve.

The Mark 5 was, however, overshadowed by the increasing efficiency and range of Bliss-Leavitt torpedoes. In 1922, all torpedoes prior to the Bliss-Leavitt Mark 7 torpedo in the US Navy's inventory were condemned in favor of more modern versions.

The Mark 5 was launched from destroyers, torpedo boats and other small ships.

== See also ==
- American 18-inch torpedo
