= Walter Whitehead =

British surgeon (1840-1913)

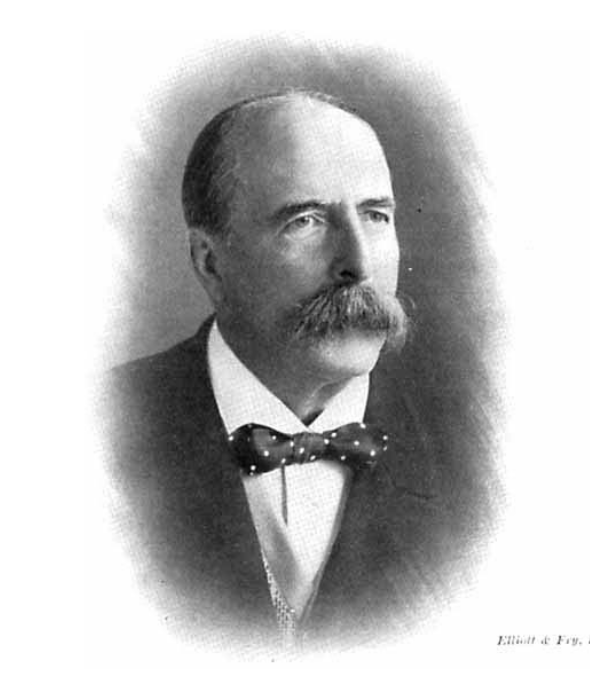
- Portrait of Whitehead by Elliott & Fry
- Born: 12 October 1840; Bury, Lancaster
- Died: 19 August 1913 (aged 72)
- Education: Royal College of Surgeons of Edinburgh
- Occupation: Surgeon
- Known for: Popularising use of anesthesia in surgeries

Walter Whitehead, FRCSE, FRSE, (12 October 1840–August 1913) was a surgeon at various hospitals in Manchester, England, and held the chair of Clinical Surgery at the Victoria University of Manchester. He was president of the British Medical Association in 1902. He once claimed that knowledge of anatomy was an impediment to being a good surgeon but was himself a bold, innovative practitioner of international repute. His procedure for excision of the tongue using scissors and his formulation of a related ointment became a standard treatment, as did a procedure he developed for the treatment of haemorrhoids.

Whitehead was born to a family with a long-standing interest in textile manufacture in Bury, Lancashire. His interest in medicine was piqued when he attended lectures intended to improve his knowledge of the chemical processes of bleaching cloth. He enrolled at the Manchester Royal School of Medicine without telling his parents and thus embarked on his medical career. He began as a general practitioner and gained experience caring for workhouse inmates, including while working for a time in Mansfield Woodhouse, Nottinghamshire. In 1867 he returned to Manchester to begin his career as a surgeon.

Several Mancunian hospitals appointed Whitehead to various surgical positions during his career, sometimes concurrently. Of those, it was the Manchester Royal Infirmary, which he joined in 1873, with which he was associated for the longest time. His association with the university in Manchester began in 1884 and eventually included governing roles as well as his professorial chair. His career also included acting as an expert witness in court cases, as a co-publisher of a medical magazine and as a member of various committees and a hospital reform organisation. He also held various posts as an officer of the Royal Army Medical Corps and related military units.

A clock tower commemorating Whitehead was erected in Bury after his death in 1913.

== Early life and training ==
Walter Whitehead was born on 12 October 1840 at Haslam Hey, between Lowercroft and Walshaw in Bury, Lancashire. (Note: Haslam Hey is sometimes spelled Haslem Hey, and Lowercroft is also spelled Lower Croft.) He was a son of John Whitehead and Eliza Ellen (née Allanson). According to some sources, his family had been textile bleachers in the Lowercroft area for well over 200 years prior to his birth, while others say that his father came from Penwortham Priory, near Preston. His father was a bleacher and perhaps also a dyer and printer of textiles. Among his relations were the inventors John Kay (flying shuttle), Robert Kay (drop box for weaving looms) and Robert Whitehead (torpedo).

Whitehead, who extracted the teeth of his younger siblings while a child, described himself as being a wilful character. This trait caused him to be sent at the age of eight to an academy on the Isle of Man that promised to improve his character, apparently through coercion. It failed in its purpose and after three years there he was sent for six months to a school in Altrincham. Thereafter, he attended Making Place, a boarding school in Soyland, near to Ripponden. These latter two schools were much more relaxed in their treatment of pupils and he thrived in that environment; he became head boy at Making Place, where the headmaster believed in placing trust in his pupils to act on their honour. (Note: During Whitehead's time, William Dove was the headmaster at Making Place, which is variously referred to as Making Place Hall, Making Place Academy, Making Place School and the Ripponden Commercial College. Around the time Whitehead attended, the school had fourteen masters and could accommodate around 100 pupils. Dove was elected a member of the Royal Society of Arts in 1856 and died aged 53 on 22 October 1865. Whitehead was among those of Dove's pupils who arranged for the installation of a window in Ripponden Church commemorating their former master.)

Whitehead began work in his father's business when he was sixteen. He earned 2s. 6d. a week, never progressed beyond being an ordinary workman of the lowest grade, and according to an obituary in the British Medical Journal (BMJ), enjoyed what he did. A similar tribute in The Manchester Guardian noted otherwise, saying that he was not particularly enamoured with his work. Both agree that he met with medical students in Manchester while attending chemistry lectures intended to give him more knowledge of the workings of the family business; later, he also met with them while attending the market in Manchester on behalf of the business.

In 1859, Whitehead enrolled at the Manchester Royal School of Medicine, also known as the Chatham Street Medical School. He did so without telling his parents and by borrowing money from a cousin for the purpose. Concurrent with the early years of his training, and as was usual at the time, he was apprenticed for 18 months to the general practice of Drs. Harris and Bennett in Bury. These two men also acted as medical officers appointed by the Board of Guardians of the Bury Poor Law Union; Bennett alone was attending an average of 860 cases per annum for the Union around this time and Whitehead was thus exposed to work specifically relating to the conditions of the poor as well as general dispensing. The experience gained during this initial period subsequently enabled him to act as a locum tenens at the Manchester Royal Infirmary (MRI), where he mingled with qualified physicians and surgical staff, watched operations and witnessed the administrative workings of a hospital. So much of his time was spent at the hospital that it became his primary residence; he also spent six months working in the infirmary at Withington workhouse.

Whitehead was awarded a Certificate of Merit at the end of his first year in training, when his address was given as 16 Union Square, Bury. In 1864, he was awarded a licentiate by the Society of Apothecaries in London and from institutions in Edinburgh (LM) and Glasgow (LFPS).

== Hospital career ==
Whitehead moved to Mansfield Woodhouse, Nottinghamshire, on completion of his training. There he bought a general practice and in 1866 established an eight-bed cottage hospital. The business of the practice itself was not great but he also held the post of medical officer to the local Poor Law Union. The Union provided him with plenty of work and a gross income of 30 guineas a year, out of which he had to fund his own horse for transport and supply all medicines and surgical equipment. He became a Fellow of the Royal College of Surgeons of Edinburgh in 1866. A year later, he sold his practice and returned to Manchester, where he was appointed Honorary Surgeon at St Mary's Hospital for Women and Children in 1868. He remained there until he moved to the MRI to be Honorary Assistant Surgeon in 1873. In 1876 he was a signatory to the almost-unanimous request from MRI medical staff for the hospital to be rebuilt, either on its current site or elsewhere, due to its inadequacies both in size and design. He was promoted to Honorary Surgeon in 1879 and in the early 1880s he abandoned his remaining involvement in general practice to concentrate entirely on surgical work. He was elected a Fellow of the Royal Society of Edinburgh on 7 February 1881. As was customary, he was appointed an Honorary Consulting Surgeon at the MRI when he reached his 60th birthday in 1900, at which point regulations demanded he resign his position as the senior Honorary Surgeon. This last appointment at the MRI coincided with the 30th anniversary of his association with the hospital and was marked with a dinner attended by surgical colleagues such as F. A. Southam and Bilton Pollard; it was described by the BMJ as "probably the first of its kind" in the city. (Note: Frafjord et al. state that Whitehead's appointment as Consulting Surgeon was in 1879. The accounts in the British Medical Journal, however, are contemporaneous notices. Lim et al. say that he retired from the MRI in 1900 and then was appointed Consulting Surgeon.)

Whitehead played a significant role in the establishment of the Manchester and Salford Hospital for Diseases of the Skin in 1888, which was done by dividing the specialisms of the Manchester and Salford Lock and Skin Hospital. He had been appointed a Surgeon at the Lock Hospital in 1881, became the senior Surgeon at the Christie Cancer Pavilion, when it was established in 1892, and also held an active post at the new Skin Hospital. Although retired from the MRI, Whitehead remained a Surgeon at the Lock Hospital until July 1904, when he resigned and was appointed Consulting Surgeon. He was a Consulting Surgeon at the Skin Hospital by 1902 and at that time was still the senior Surgeon at the Cancer Pavilion, where he also eventually held an appointment as Consulting Surgeon.

== Other appointments ==
=== Education ===
Although Whitehead did not teach very often, he was respected by those whom he did educate and his ward classes attracted good attendances. He was appointed Lecturer in Surgery in 1884 and then, between 1892 and 1900, he was the first holder of the Chair of Clinical Surgery at the Victoria University of Manchester. (Note: Some sources — Lim et al. and Peter Mohr — give the date of Whitehead's appointment as Professor of Clinical Surgery as 1894 but the BMJ announcement in 1892 is contemporaneous. It is possible that there was a delay between the 1892 announcement and the formal ratification of his tenure by the university's Council.) He resigned the Chair at the time of his retirement from the MRI, believing that to be in the best interests of the university's medical college. It was announced in January 1905 that he had been elected to the Court of Governors of the university and, later in the year, also became a member of its Council. He remained a Governor after resigning from the Council in 1909.

=== Medical ===
Between 1870 and 1871, Whitehead was a joint-editor, with Samuel Messenger Bradley (1841–1880), of the Manchester Medical and Surgical Reports journal. The exercise was short-lived, being superseded by the Liverpool and Manchester Medical and Surgical Reports in 1873. He was Secretary of the Manchester Medical Society between 1874 and 1878, and President in 1884. In 1899–1900 he served as President of the Manchester Ethical Society and in 1902 he was President of the British Medical Association, when its annual conference was held in Manchester.

=== Military ===
Whitehead had joined the 8th Lancashire Rifle Volunteer Corps in 1859 and was gazetted as an Ensign in August 1860. He left the force in September 1862 when he moved from the town. He took an interest in the Royal Army Medical Corps from the time of its formation in 1898. He was appointed Honorary Surgeon-Colonel in 1900 when he became Honorary Commandant in the Manchester Companies section of the Volunteer Medical Staff Corps (VMSC). Within a month he was heading a public fund-raising appeal for at least £12,000 to give the Corps, which numbered around 700 men, a suitable new drill hall. (Note: A new headquarters for the Manchester Royal Army Medical Corps (Volunteers) was constructed at Upper Chorlton Road in 1903–1904.)

=== Other ===
In addition to his institutional appointments, Whitehead was sometimes called upon to be an expert witness in court cases relating to medicine, examples of which include an action in 1896 against a known quack who claimed specialism in the treatment of hernias, and Thomas vs. Barker (an action for damages against Herbert Atkinson Barker, the bonesetter, in 1911). In 1911, Whitehead referred again to this latter case in an article published in The English Review. In this he appealed for an investigation by the medical profession into the potential for adoption of some of the methods used by bonesetters. He said that these people had traditionally been viewed by the profession, including himself, as "anathema" and "technically unqualified" but that Barker's case had demonstrated that there was good cause to investigate their methods and successes rather than be "blinded by professional prejudices".

Whitehead was involved with the Hospital Reform Association for some time. He also favoured an expansion in the number of village hospitals, believing that they would relieve pressure on hospitals such as the MRI, reduce the amount of travel for patients and provide a safer environment than private houses given the development of increasingly complex operations. (Note: The cottage hospital he opened at Mansfield Woodhouse in the 1860s was fourteen miles from the nearest public hospital.) Another cause saw him play a significant role in the introduction of a bill intended to protect infant life, reflecting his involvement in various charities whose purpose shared a similar goal. He had opened the first day nursery in Manchester and because of this he gave evidence to a House of Commons Select Committee in 1871.

Whitehead both worked and played hard. Away from medical matters, his primary interest was sailing. He built, maintained and raced yachts on Windermere and was Commodore of the Royal Windermere Yacht Club in 1899. In 1910 he donated a cup to be used as an annual club prize.

== Contributions to medicine and surgery ==
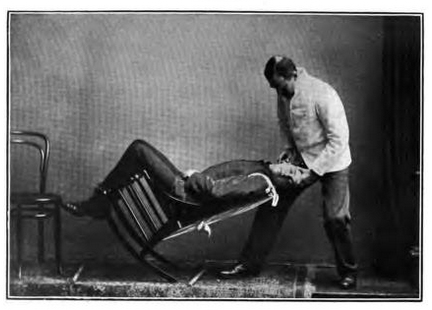
Preparation for excision of the tongue. One in a series of images demonstrating the method originated by Walter Whitehead.

Both Whitehead's training and the earlier part of his career pre-dated the introduction of anaesthetic and antiseptic techniques in surgery. It was essential to operate quickly and there was little scope for finesse. His colleague, William Thorburn, said:

Such conditions required him to be a brilliant and most rapid manipulator, and called for an unhesitating courage with the utmost simplicity of technique. Judged by this standard, [he] was one of the most brilliant surgeons of his day.

Widely respected for his simple, bold and direct operating technique, Whitehead said that "the greatest drawback under which a surgeon can suffer is knowledge of anatomy – it makes him timid". His methods did not use antiseptic but instead relied on soap and water, as was common at the time. (Note: It was Edward Lund (1823–1898) who introduced Joseph Lister's principles of antiseptic to the MRI.) Unlike many surgeons of his generation, he was open to learning and using new techniques, such as those of Joseph Lister. He was described as "one of the most go-ahead surgeons of his day" by Arthur Burgess, in his 1929 Presidential Address to the BMA. Burgess also noted that Whitehead's preference for aseptic surgery was demonstrated at the MRI in 1895 with an unorthodox mastectomy that omitted the use of antiseptic on the wound and thus aroused both interest and misgivings. The success of the operation was instrumental in causing a shift of practice within the hospital towards aseptic surgical methods.

Whitehead was particularly noted for the invention of two surgical procedures, both of which bear his name. The first related to the surgical removal of haemorrhoids and was described in the BMJ in 1882, with a further study of 300 patients being published in 1887. The technique is rarely used now because it usually left a deformity, which also bore his name, but this is because those performing the operation misunderstood his description of it. The second procedure, which was a form of glossectomy and earned him international repute, is also not much used today. It concerned removal of carcinoma from the mobile tongue and was described by him in an 1891 paper titled A Hundred Cases Of Entire Excision Of The Tongue. There is a story that this latter procedure was devised when he was irritable due to a hangover and declined the choice of surgical instruments offered to him with the words "for God's sake give me a pair of scissors". Twenty of the patients described in the 1891 paper died post-operatively; he said that he believed all 300 patients documented his 1887 paper had been "completely and permanently cured".

In addition to his surgical innovations, which also included a new technique for tracheostomy, Whitehead created the eponymous Whitehead's Varnish, which is now sometimes called Whitehead's ointment. This strong-smelling substance is still used, although the chemical composition has been somewhat modified. Devised by him around 1881, it was described in his 1891 BMJ paper. In its original version, it was a solution of iodoform, turpentine and the solids of Friar's Balsam, that hardened as a dressing to give anaesthetic and antiseptic benefits for wounds that were situated in potentially contaminated areas of the body. In its application during his tongue excision procedure, he noted that it enabled the patient "to take food in the ordinary manner almost immediately after the operation"; nowadays, it is used for such things as packing jaw and nasal cavities, and on areas of the body where skin has been removed for grafting.

Among Whitehead's patients were Joseph Nuttall, a renowned professional swimmer of the time, and the footballers Di Jones and Charlie Burgess.

== Last years ==
Whitehead and his wife were listed as supporters of the Primrose League in 1901, and in 1891 Whitehead had supported Viscount Emlyn's attempt to unseat Henry Enfield Roscoe as MP for South Manchester.

Some time in the late 1890s, Whitehead bought 37 acres (15 ha) of land at Flagstaff Hill in Colwyn Bay, North Wales. This became known as The Flagstaff and there he engaged the services of the landscape gardener Thomas Hayton Mawson and the architect Dan Gibson, with whom Mawson was for some time in partnership. In 1907, he said that he had "practically resided in Colwyn Bay for the last nine years". By 1902 he was president of the town's golf club. He retired to his new residence in 1903, where he indulged in his pastimes of entertaining friends, gardening and yachting. He became president of the Colwyn Bay Chess Club and he praised both the people and the environment, as well as defending the town against charges of unsanitary conditions that were raised in the House of Commons in 1907. He also allowed the Gorsedd circle for the 1910 National Eisteddfod of Wales to be built in the grounds at The Flagstaff.

Whitehead bought at least four other residential properties in Colwyn Bay but the grand mansion house that he had planned at The Flagstaff was never constructed and he lived instead in the estate's gatehouse. (Note: The Flagstaff estate is now home to the Welsh Mountain Zoo. Although many of the features from Whitehead's day are no longer visible, enough survive that it has Grade II listing status.) He died at Colwyn Bay of a stroke on 19 August 1913, and was survived by his second wife and his daughter. He had suffered a stroke at least once previously and had been in poor health since that time. His funeral took place at Manchester Crematorium on 23 August 1913 and his ashes were interred at The Flagstaff. (Note: Whitehead's interred ashes were rediscovered at The Flagstaff at a later date and moved elsewhere.) He left a net estate valued at £176,892. (Note: Several of Whitehead's Colwyn Bay properties were auctioned in 1914; The Flagstaff was auctioned in 1920.)

== Memorials ==
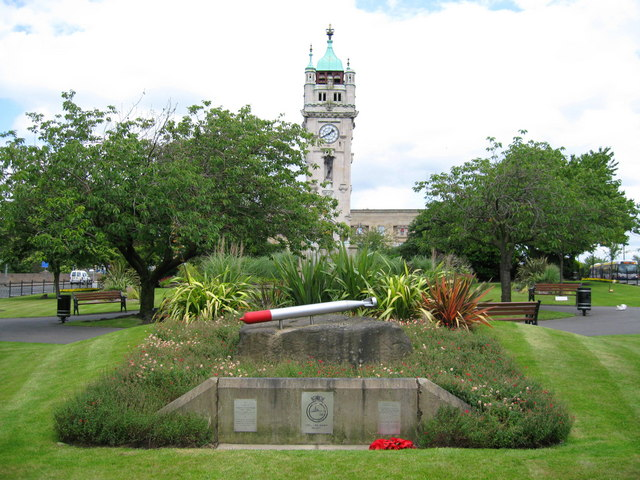
The clock tower commemorating Walter Whitehead in Bury. The torpedo in the foreground commemorates his relative, Robert Whitehead.

Whitehead is commemorated in Bury with a 20.41-metre-high (67.0 ft) clock tower and surrounding gardens near to the Town Hall. Both were donated by his brother, Henry, who had been High Sheriff of Lancashire in 1903 and who, like his father, was a prominent local industrialist. (Note: Prior to gifting the Whitehead Clock Tower and its surrounding lands, which were formerly occupied by a lunatic asylum, Henry Whitehead had donated the Kay Memorial and surrounding gardens to the people of Bury.) It was designed by Maxwell and Tuke in a late Tudor style and is constructed of Portland stone and granite, with a copper canopy, a bronze effigy of Time and bronze plaques. The stonework was carved by John Jarvis Millson; the effigy was the work of Moreau, although which of the many sculptors who bore that name is uncertain. The dial clocks that are present on each side were constructed by J. B. Joyce & Co. Despite appearances, the tower contains no bells.

The tower was formally dedicated on 27 June 1914 by Sir Frederick Treves, who described Whitehead as a "Lancastrian among surgeons". It was designated a Grade II listed building in January 1985.

Henry Whitehead gave £1000 for the endowment of a cot in the new MRI surgical ward that had been named after his brother. In 1937, a Robert Whitehead gave £1000 to the MRI for the endowment of a bed in his memory.

== Publications ==
Whitehead's publications include:

- Browne, JC (11 February 1871). "Mucous Disease". The British Medical Journal. 1 (528): 143–144. doi:10.1136/bmj.1.528.143. PMC 2260043. PMID 20746113.
- Whitehead, W. (18 February 1871). "Mucous Disease". The British Medical Journal. 1 (529): 166–168. doi:10.1136/bmj.1.529.166-a. PMC 2260063. PMID 20746124.
- Whitehead, Walter (13 May 1871). "Strange Course Of A Uterine Sound". The Lancet. 1 (2489): 667. doi:10.1016/S0140-6736(02)51177-6.
- "Exfoliation Of The Bladder". The British Medical Journal. 2 (563): 432–433. 14 October 1871. PMC 2261806. PMID 20746381.
- Whitehead, W. (20 July 1872). "Partial Amputation Of The Glans Penis By The Accumulated Detritus Of Underclothing". The British Medical Journal. 2 (603): 62. doi:10.1136/bmj.2.603.62. PMC 2296935. PMID 20746705.
- Whitehead, W. (12 October 1872). "Absence Of The Uterus After Repeated Pregnancies". The British Medical Journal. 2 (615): 408–409. doi:10.1136/bmj.2.615.408. PMC 2294009. PMID 20746793.
- Whitehead, Walter (8 February 1873). "Removal Of The Entire Tongue For Cancer By The Galvanic Ecraseur". The Lancet. 1 (2580): 198–199. doi:10.1016/S0140-6736(02)72388-X.
- "Entire Removal Of Tongue By Scissors". The British Medical Journal. 2 (884): 803–4. 8 December 1877. PMC 2221604. PMID 20748705.
- Whitehead, Walter (12 July 1879). "The Painless And Bloodless Method Of Excising The Whole Tongue". The Lancet. 2 (2915): 67. doi:10.1016/S0140-6736(02)47672-6.
- "The Treatment Of Fine Strictures". The British Medical Journal. 2 (1043): 1013–4. 25 December 1880. PMC 2241568. PMID 20749742.
- Whitehead, Walter (22 October 1881). "Excision of the Tongue". The Lancet. 2 (3034): 698–700. doi:10.1016/S0140-6736(02)22788-9.
- Whitehead, Walter (29 October 1881). "Excision of the Tongue". The Lancet. 2 (3035): 745–747. doi:10.1016/S0140-6736(02)24268-3.
- Whitehead, W. (4 February 1882). "The Surgical Treatment Of Hæmorrhoids". The British Medical Journal. 1 (1101): 148–150. doi:10.1136/bmj.1.1101.148. PMC 2371350. PMID 20750106.
- Whitehead, W. (11 March 1882). "The Use Of Iodoform In The Treatment Of Soft Sores". The British Medical Journal. 1 (1106): 340. doi:10.1136/bmj.1.1106.340. PMC 2371510. PMID 20750137.
- Whitehead, W. (8 April 1882). "Manchester Royal Infirmary: Traumatic Haemothorax From An Incised Wound Of The Thorax: Recovery, Remarks". The Lancet. 1 (3058): 567. doi:10.1016/S0140-6736(02)21826-7.
- Whitehead, W. (8 April 1882). "New Method Of Urethral Irrigation". The British Medical Journal. 1 (1110): 497–498. doi:10.1136/bmj.1.1110.497-b. PMC 2371603. PMID 20750163.
- Whitehead, Walter (4 November 1882). "Successful Extirpation Of The Larynx". The Lancet. 2 (3088): 741–742. doi:10.1016/S0140-6736(02)04284-8.
- Whitehead, Walter; Pollard, Bilton (6 October 1883). "The Surgical Treatment Of Tumours And Other Obscure Conditions Of The Bladder". The Lancet. 2 (3136): 582–583. doi:10.1016/S0140-6736(02)32306-7. PMC 5908037. S2CID 53432521. (with Bilton Pollard)
- Whitehead, Walter; Pollard, Bilton (13 October 1883). "The Surgical Treatment Of Tumours And Other Obscure Conditions Of The Bladder". The Lancet. 2 (3137): 629–632. doi:10.1016/S0140-6736(02)36048-3. PMC 5908037. (with Bilton Pollard)
- Whitehead, Walter; Pollard, Bilton (20 October 1883). "The Surgical Treatment Of Tumours And Other Obscure Conditions Of The Bladder". The Lancet. 2 (3138): 673–675. doi:10.1016/S0140-6736(02)36128-2. PMC 5908037. (with Bilton Pollard)
- Whitehead, Walter; Pollard, Bilton (15 December 1883). "The Surgical Treatment Of Tumours Of The Bladder". The Lancet. 2 (3146): 1063–1064. doi:10.1016/S0140-6736(02)23183-9. (with Bilton Pollard)
- Whitehead, W. (22 January 1884). "Radical Cure of a Large Spina Bifida in an Adult". Medico-Chirurgical Transactions. LXVII: 127–132. doi:10.1177/095952878406700110. PMC 2121383. PMID 20896626.
- Whitehead, W. (24 January 1885). "Excision Of The Caecum For Epithelioma: Death On The Thirteenth Day". The British Medical Journal. 1 (1256): 171–174. doi:10.1136/bmj.1.1256.171. PMC 2255714. PMID 20751144.
- Whitehead, Walter (5 September 1885). "Santonin In Amenorrhea". The Lancet. 2 (3236): 430–431. doi:10.1016/S0140-6736(02)28119-2.
- Whitehead, Walter (3 October 1885). "Mesmerism At Owens College". The Lancet. 2 (3240): 641–642. doi:10.1016/S0140-6736(02)28466-4.
- Whitehead, W. (10 October 1885). "Mesmerism At The Manchester Medical Society". The British Medical Journal. 2 (1293): 721–722. doi:10.1136/bmj.2.1293.721-a. PMC 2308655.
- Whitehead, Walter (17 July 1886). "Excision Of The Coccyx". The Lancet. 2 (3281): 112–113. doi:10.1016/S0140-6736(02)10584-8.
- Whitehead, W. (26 February 1887). "Three Hundred Consecutive Cases Of Haemorrhoids Cured By Excision". The British Medical Journal. 1 (1365): 449–451. doi:10.1136/bmj.1.1365.449. PMC 2534205. PMID 20751814.
- Whitehead, Walter (30 April 1887). "Tracheotomy". The Lancet. 1 (3322): 873. doi:10.1016/S0140-6736(02)27933-7. S2CID 215172325.
- Whitehead, Walter (19 November 1887). "Is Cancer Contagious?". The Lancet. 2 (3351): 1040. doi:10.1016/S0140-6736(00)30884-4.
- Whitehead, Walter (28 January 1888). "Excision Of The Tongue". The Lancet. 1 (3361): 167–169. doi:10.1016/S0140-6736(02)25415-X.
- "Abstract Of A Clinical Lecture On The Surgery Of The Thyroid". The Lancet. 1 (3367): 459–461. 10 March 1888. doi:10.1016/S0140-6736(02)26779-3.
- Whitehead, W. (8 December 1888). "The Arterial Origin Of Piles". The British Medical Journal. 2 (1458): 1311. doi:10.1136/bmj.2.1458.1311. PMC 2198760.
- Whitehead, W. (5 January 1889). "The Arterial Origin Of Hæmorrhoids". The British Medical Journal. 1 (1462): 42. doi:10.1136/bmj.1.1462.42. PMC 2154520.
- Whitehead, W. (26 January 1889). "Arterial Origin Of Piles". The British Medical Journal. 1 (1465): 213. doi:10.1136/bmj.1.1465.213-a. PMC 2154625.
- "Manchester Royal Infirmay: Sarcoma Of The Bladder; Incontinence Of Urine; Perineal And Supra-Pubic Cystotomy; Eighteen Months Without Relapse". The Lancet. 1 (3417): 13–14. 23 February 1889. doi:10.1016/S0140-6736(00)30105-2. PMC 5022420. PMID 29809390.
- Whitehead, W. (13 April 1889). "The Treatment Of Confirmed Catheter Life By A Permanent Perineal Opening". The British Medical Journal. 1 (1476): 831–833. doi:10.1136/bmj.1.1476.831. PMC 2155107. PMID 20752666.
- Whitehead, Walter (13 December 1890). "Injecting The Bladder In Supra-Pubic Cystotomy". The Lancet. 2 (3511): 1300. doi:10.1016/S0140-6736(01)86725-8.
- Whitehead, W. (2 May 1891). "A Hundred Cases Of Entire Excision Of The Tongue". The British Medical Journal. 1 (1583): 961–964. doi:10.1136/bmj.1.1583.961. PMC 2272991. PMID 20753311.
- Whitehead, Walter (9 May 1891). "Report of 104 Cases Of Entire Excision Of The Tongue For Cancer". The Lancet. 1 (3532): 1032–1035. doi:10.1016/S0140-6736(02)00049-1.
- Whitehead, Walter (3 January 1891). "Diverticulum Of Oesophagus Causing Obstruction; Gastrostomy; Death Six Years Afterwards". The Lancet. 1 (3514): 11–13. doi:10.1016/S0140-6736(02)15669-8.
- Whitehead, W. (9 February 1901). "The Surgical Treatment Of Migraine". The British Medical Journal. 1 (2093): 335–336. doi:10.1136/bmj.1.2093.335. PMC 2400226. PMID 20759429.
- Whitehead, W. (29 March 1902). "Remarks On Cases Of Lymphangiectasis With Enormous Overgrowth Of Cutaneous And Subcutaneous Structures". The British Medical Journal. 1 (2152): 757–764. doi:10.1136/bmj.1.2152.757. PMC 2511514. PMID 20760145.
- Whitehead, W. (21 June 1902). "Observations On The "Open Method" Of Treating Exceptional Cases Of Septic Arthritis Of The Knee". The British Medical Journal. 1 (2164): 1523–1524. doi:10.1136/bmj.1.2164.1523. PMC 2512640. PMID 20760321.
- Whitehead, W. (12 July 1902). "The "Open Method" In Septic Arthritis Of The Knee". The British Medical Journal. 2 (2167): 155. doi:10.1136/bmj.2.2167.155. PMC 2401295.
- Whitehead, W. (2 August 1902). "President's Address Delivered, At The Seventieth Annual Meeting Of The British Medical Association, Manchester's Early Influence On The Advancement Of Medicine And Medical Education". The British Medical Journal. 2 (2170): 301–313. doi:10.1136/bmj.2.2170.301. PMC 2401730.
- "Excision Of The Tongue For Cancer". The Practitioner. LXX: 585–594. April 1903.
- "Bonesetting and the Faculty". The English Review. June 1911.
