= Mark 3 torpedo =

Mark 3 torpedo may refer to:

- Whitehead Mark 3 torpedo
- Bliss-Leavitt Mark 3 torpedo
