= Joseph Nuttall =

English swimmer

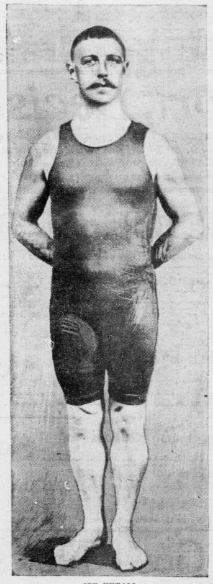
- Nuttall circa 1904

Personal information
- Nationality: British
- Born: 31 August 1869 Manchester, England
- Died: 1 June 1942 (aged 72)
- Height: 5 ft 5 3/4 in (1888)
- Weight: 141 pds (1888)

Sport
- Sport: Swimming

Joseph Nuttall (31 August 1869 – 1 June 1942) was an accomplished English swimmer in the 1880s and 1890s, and into the early 1900s. He was the amateur English 100-yard and 220-yard champion from 1886 to 1888. He later turned professional and was generally the fastest professional of his period.

Nuttall was born in Manchester, and moved with his family to Stalybridge, learning to swim in one of England's first public pools. He won his first competitive race at age 12 in 1881. He swam as an amateur until 1888, and then swam as a professional for many years, establishing many records at different lengths. His primary stroke was the trudgeon.

Other notable English swimmers of Nuttall's time included James H. Tyers, John Derbyshire, and John Arthur Jarvis. Nuttall also had notable races against English swimmer James Finney (in 1890), American swimmer James L. McCusker (including in 1893 and 1904), and Australians Ernest Cavill in 1894 and his brother Percy Cavill in 1904.

He ended his professional swimming career around 1911. Nuttall died in Blackpool in 1942, survived by his wife Gertrude and one daughter. He was buried in an unmarked grave in Layton Cemetery.
