= James L. McCusker =

American swimmer

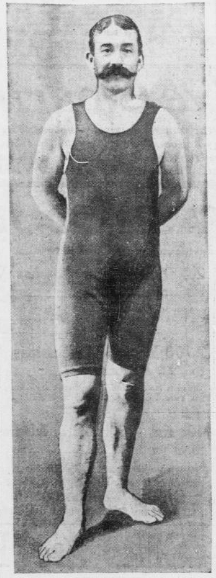
- McCusker circa 1904

Personal information
- Nationality: Irish-American
- Born: c. 1869 Ireland
- Height: 5 ft 9 1/2 in (177 cm)
- Weight: 173 lb (78 kg)

Sport
- Sport: Swimming

James L. McCusker (b. abt. 1869) was an American swimmer known for his high-profile swims against top competitors in the 1890s and early 1900s.

McCusker was born in Ireland and emigrated to the United States, living in Everett, Massachusetts. After winning a three-man September 1891 swimming race at Lake Quinsigamond against John Leavitt and Robert Magree for a prize of $750, he was declared the American champion. He then proceeded to travel to challenge other top swimmers to matches, including James Finney, Joseph Nuttall in England in 1893 and Boston in 1904 and Australian Percy Cavill.

After failing in an attempt to cross the English Channel in 1907, by 1908 McCusker fell on hard times, and was sent to the Massachusetts state mental hospital for two years related to theft charges.
