= American 18-inch torpedo =

List of 18-inch torpedoes used by the USA

There have been a number of 18-inch torpedoes in service with the United States. These have been used on ships and submarines of the US Navy. American "18-inch" torpedoes were actually 17.7 inches (45 cm) in diameter, beginning with the "Fiume" Whitehead torpedo of 1890.

Ship classes that carried 18-inch torpedoes include:

- Aylwin-class destroyers
- B-class through some R-class submarines
- Bainbridge-class destroyers
- Cassin-class destroyers
- Cincinnati-class cruisers
- Columbia-class cruisers
- Illinois-class battleships
- Indiana-class battleships
- Kearsarge-class battleships
- Maine-class battleships
- Montgomery-class cruisers
- Paulding-class destroyers
- Pennsylvania-class cruisers
- Plunger-class submarines
- Smith-class destroyers
- Truxtun-class destroyers

Name	Country	In service date	Platform / target	Dimensions	Warhead	Propulsion	Performance
"Fiume" Whitehead torpedo	US	1894	Surface / Surface	Diameter: 17.7 in (45 cm); Length: 140 in (360 cm); Weight: 845 lb (383 kg)	54 kg (119 lb); Guncotton	Compressed air	Speed: 26.5 kn (49.1 km/h); Range: 800 yd (730 m)
Mark 4 (Bliss-Leavitt)	US	1908–1922	Submarine / Surface ship	Diameter: 17.72 in (450 mm); Length: 197 in (5,000 mm); Weight: 1,500 lb (680 kg)		Vertical Turbine	
Mark 6 (Bliss-Leavitt)	US	1911–1922	Surface / Surface ship	Diameter: 17.7 in (45 cm); Length: 204 in (520 cm); Weight: 1,800 lb (820 kg)		Turbine	Speed: 35 kn (65 km/h); Range: 2,000 yd (1,800 m)
Mark 7 (Bliss-Leavitt (Short)	US	1917	Submarine / Surface ship	Diameter: 17.7 in (45 cm); Length: 144 in (370 cm); Weight: 1,036 lb (470 kg)	281 lb (127 kg); TNT	Turbine	Speed:35 kn (65 km/h)
Mark 7 (Bliss-Leavitt)(long)	US	1912–1945	Submarine & Surface / Surface ship	Diameter: 17.7 in (45 cm); Length: 204 in (520 cm); Weight: 1,682 lb (763 kg)	326 lb (148 kg); TNT	Turbine	Speed: 35 kn (65 km/h); Range: 3,500 yd (3,200 m) or 6,000 yd (5,500 m)
Whitehead torpedo Mk.1 (short)	US	1894–1913	Surface / Surface ship	Diameter: 17.7 in (45 cm); Length: 140 in (360 cm); Weight: 845 lb (383 kg)	118 lb (54 kg); Guncotton	Air-flask Brotherhood pattern engine	Speed: 26.5 kn (49.1 km/h); Range: 800 yd (730 m)
Whitehead torpedo Mk.1 (long)	US	1894–1922	Surface / Surface ship	Diameter: 17.7 in (45 cm); Length: 197 in (500 cm); Weight: 1,160 lb (530 kg)	220 lb (100 kg); Guncotton	Air-flask Brotherhood pattern engine	Speed: 27.5 kn (50.9 km/h); Range: 800 yd (730 m)
Whitehead torpedo Mk.2 (short)	US	1896–1913	Surface / Surface	Diameter: 17.7 in (45 cm); Length: 140 in (360 cm); Weight: 845 lb (383 kg)	118 lb (54 kg); Guncotton	Air-flask Brotherhood pattern engine	Speed: 27 kn (50 km/h); Range: 800 yd (730 m)
Whitehead torpedo Mk.2 (long)	US	189?–1922	Surface / Surface	Diameter: 17.7 in (45 cm); Length: 197 in (500 cm); Weight: 1,232 lb (559 kg)	132 lb (60 kg); Guncotton	Air-flask Brotherhood pattern engine	Speed: 28.5 kn (52.8 km/h); Range: 1,500 yd (1,400 m)
Whitehead torpedo Mk.3	US	1898–1922	Surface / Surface	Diameter: 17.7 in (45 cm); Length: 140 in (360 cm); Weight: 845 lb (383 kg)	118 lb (54 kg); Guncotton	Air-flask Brotherhood pattern engine	Speed: 26.5 kn (49.1 km/h); Range: 800 yd (730 m)
Whitehead torpedo Mk.5	US	1910–1922	Surface & Submarine / Surface	Diameter: 17.7 in (45 cm); Length: 204 in (520 cm); Weight: 1,452 lb (659 kg)	200 lb (91 kg); Guncotton	Heated Air-flask Brotherhood pattern engine	Low: 27 kn (50 km/h); Range: 4,000 yd (3,700 m) Medium: 36 kn (67 km/h); Range: 2,000 yd (1,800 m) High: 40 kn (74 km/h); Range: 1,000 yd (910 m)

== See also ==
- American 21-inch torpedo
