= John Adams Howell =

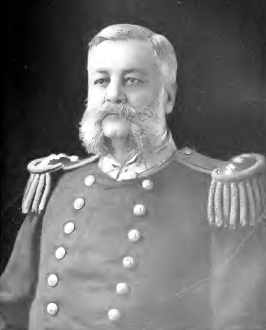
- Born: March 16, 1840; Bath, New York
- Died: January 10, 1918 (aged 77); Warrenton, Virginia
- Spouse: Arabelle E. Krause (m. 1867)
- Military career
- Allegiance: United States of America
- Branch: United States Navy
- Service years: 1858–1902
- Rank: Rear admiral
- Conflicts: American Civil War; Spanish–American War

John Adams Howell (March 16, 1840 – January 10, 1918) was a rear admiral of the United States Navy who served during the American Civil War and the Spanish–American War. He was also a noted inventor.

== Biography ==
Howell was born in Bath, New York, on March 16, 1840, to William and Adelphia Frances Howell. He had four brothers; Edward Augustus Howell, William Howell, Jr., and twins Robert and William Adams, who died before their first birthday. He graduated from the United States Naval Academy in 1858, and was promoted to lieutenant in April 1861. He married Arabelle E. Krause on May 11, 1867, and they had three children: William, Arabella, and Frances.

The American Civil War broke out in April 1861. During the war, Howell served as executive officer of the steam sloop Ossipee at the Battle of Mobile Bay on August 5, 1864, and was honorably mentioned in despatches by his commanding officer .

Howell was promoted to lieutenant commander in March 1865 and to commander on March 6, 1872.

Howell was an assistant in the United States Coast Survey, and the commanding officer of the U.S. Coast Survey steamer USC&GS A. D. Bache in the early 1870s. The Howell Basin, in the Atlantic Ocean east of Cape Cod, Massachusetts, and the Howell Hook, a submerged reef off southern Florida, are named in his honor.

Howell was promoted to captain on March 1, 1884, and in 1887 was a member of the Naval Advisory Board. He was promoted to rear admiral in 1898. During the Spanish–American War of 1898 he commanded a division of the North Atlantic Squadron.

Howell died in Warrenton, Virginia, on January 10, 1918.

== Inventions ==
Howell is remembered less for his wartime achievements than for his innovations in ordnance. He invented the self-steering torpedo – the "Howell torpedo" – and also patented torpedo launchers, gyroscopes for the guidance of torpedoes, explosive shells, a disappearing gun carriage for shore defense emplacement, and an amphibious lifeboat.
