= Whitehead Mark 1B torpedo =

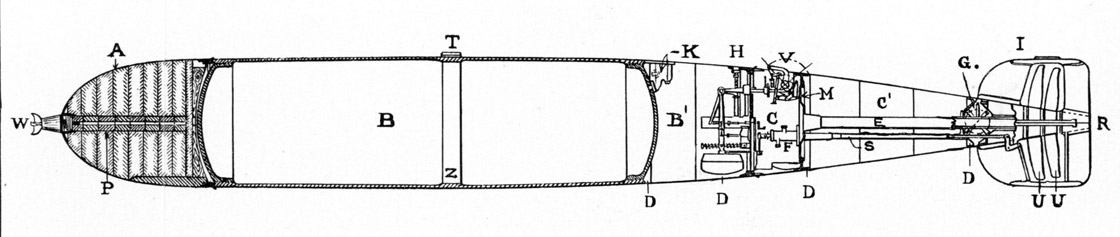
- Whitehead torpedo mechanism, published 1891
- Type: Anti-surface ship torpedo
- Place of origin: Austria-Hungary

Service history
- In service: 1894–1922
- Used by: United States Navy

Production history
- Designer: Robert Whitehead
- Designed: 1892
- Manufacturer: Torpedofabrik Whitehead & Co. E. W. Bliss Company

Specifications
- Mass: 1160 pounds
- Length: 197 inches (5.0 meters)
- Diameter: 17.7 inches (45 centimeters)
- Effective firing range: 800 yards
- Warhead: wet guncotton
- Warhead weight: 220 pounds
- Detonation mechanism: War Nose Mk 1 contact exploder
- Engine: 3-cylinder reciprocating
- Maximum speed: 27.5 knots
- Guidance system: depth control, gyroscope
- Launch platform: battleships and torpedo boats

The Whitehead Mark 1B torpedo, designated as a Torpedo Type B, was a variant of the Whitehead Mark 1 torpedo adopted by the United States Navy for use in an anti-surface ship role after the E. W. Bliss Company of Brooklyn, New York secured manufacturing rights in 1892. The primary differences between the Mark 1 and the Mark 1B were that the Mark 1B was longer, carried a heavier guncotton charge in the warhead and included an improved guidance system.

== Characteristics ==
The Mark 1B was ordinarily assembled into three sections: the warhead, the air flask and the after-body. The warhead carried the explosive charge of wet guncotton. The Mark 1B was a "cold-running" torpedo. The three-cylinder reciprocating engine ran on cold, compressed air which was stored in the air flask at 1350 pounds per square inch. The after-body carried the engine and the tail, which contained the propellers.

The Mark 1B guidance component included the Pendulum-and-hydrostat control device which was called the "Whitehead Secret" and, for the last forty units of the production, the Obry steering gyro for azimuth control. This device reduced the maximum deviation right or left of the target from 24 to 8 yards.

The Mark 1B was launched from battleships and torpedo boats.

== See also ==
- American 18-inch torpedo
