= Jim McCusker (footballer) =

Northern Ireland footballer (1939–2023)

Personal information
- Full name: James McCusker
- Date of birth: 27 December 1939
- Place of birth: Maghera, Northern Ireland
- Date of death: 28 November 2023 (aged 83)
- Position: Goalkeeper

Youth career
- 1956–1957: Bradford City

Senior career*
Years	Team	Apps	(Gls)
1957–1959	Bradford City	7	(0)
1959–1960	Stockport County	2	(0)
- Scarborough
Total		9+	(0+)
- * Club domestic league appearances and goals

James McCusker (27 December 1939 – 28 November 2023) was a Northern Irish professional footballer who played as a goalkeeper.

== Career ==
Born in Maghera, McCusker joined Bradford City as an amateur in December 1956. He joined the first team in February 1957. He made 7 league appearances for the club. He left the club to join Stockport County in August 1959, for whom he made a further 2 league appearances. He later played for Scarborough.

== Death ==
McCusker died on 28 November 2023, at the age of 83.

== Sources ==
- Frost, Terry (1988). Bradford City A Complete Record 1903-1988. Breedon Books Sport. ISBN 0-907969-38-0.
