= James Finney (swimmer) =

British swimmer (1862–1924)

Personal information
- Nationality: British
- Born: June 21, 1862 Stockport, Cheshire
- Died: February 1924 (aged 62)

Sport
- Sport: Swimming

James Finney (21 June 1862 - February 1924) was a top English swimmer in the 1880s. In 1882, he swam underwater for 340 feet, and also held an English record for staying underwater for 4 min 29.25 sec in 1886. Finney toured England and America doing swimming exhibitions through at least 1911, sometimes with his sister Marie, and eventually including his daughters in his performances. He appeared many times at the London Pavilion and elsewhere with his daughters in a tank act. He was the holder of many swimming records. Mr Finney was a popular member of the old Grand Order of Water Rats, and held office in that society. He died in 1924, and his funeral tool place on 9 February 1924. James was 61 years of age.
