= Giovanni Luppis =

Austro-Hungarian Navy officer

Baron Giovani (Ivan) Luppis Frigate captain
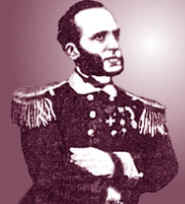
- Born: Giovanni Biagio Luppis von Rammer; 27 August 1813; Fiume, Illyrian Provinces (now Rijeka, Croatia)
- Died: 11 January 1875 (aged 61); Milan, Kingdom of Italy (now Italy)
- Military career
- Allegiance: Austria-Hungary
- Branch: Austro-Hungarian Navy
- Conflicts: Second Italian War of Independence

Giovanni (Ivan) Biagio Luppis, Freiherr von Rammer (27 August 1813 – 11 January 1875), sometimes also known by the Croatian names Lupis and Vukić, was an officer of the Austro-Hungarian Navy who headed a commission to develop the first prototypes of the self-propelled torpedo.

== Early years ==
Giovanni Luppis in his early years

Giovanni Luppis (or Ivan Lupis) was born in the city of Rijeka (then Fiume) in 1813, which was at the time part of the Illyrian Provinces, but soon passed back to Austria. His father was Ferdineo Carlo Lupis or Luppis, whose father in turn had moved to Fiume from Viganj on Pelješac, where the family was ennobled. His mother was Giovanna Parich (Parić or Perić), descended from a noble family of the Republic of Dubrovnik. Because of his mixed Italian-Croatian ancestry, his family was at different times also known as Vukić, a Croatianized variant of the name Lupis (both meaning "wolf"), and he himself is occasionally referred to as Ivan Vukić, especially by Croatians. (Note: Luppis was descended from a branch of the Italian noble family of Luppis, which migrated into Dalmatia around the 13th century from Giovinazzo, in Apulia. This branch moved first to the Republic of Dubrovnik where they were known as Lupis, and over time they Slavicized the name into Vuk, Vukić, or Vukassinovich / Vukašinović, all cognates of lupus, meaning "wolf". When members of the family later moved to Fiume/Rijeka, they Italianized their name back into Luppis.)

In the city of Fiume, Giovanni Luppis's family has been powerful shipowners. Luppis attended a gymnasium in Fiume and the Austrian Naval Cadet School in Venice. Then he married a noblewoman, the Baroness Elisa de Zotti.

He served as an officer in the Austrian Navy (after 1849 the Imperial and Royal Navy, German K.u.K Kriegsmarine), in which he rose to the rank of Frigate Captain (Fregattenkapitan). In 1848/1849 he was an officer on the ships that blockaded Venice.

== The "Salvacoste" (Coastsaver) ==
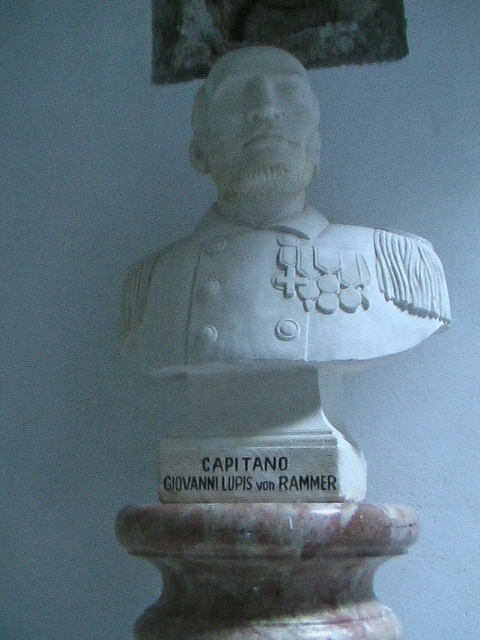
Bust of the Baron Captain Giovanni Luppis von Rammer in the Family Palace in Italy

Luppis came into the possession of the private papers of a then-deceased 18th-century anonymous officer of the Austrian Marine Artillery who conceived the idea of employing a boat carrying explosives remotely steered by cable against enemy ships.

Lupis envisioned a floating device for destroying ships that would be unmanned and controlled from land, while the explosive charges would detonate at the moment of impact. His first prototype was one metre long, had glass wings, and was controlled via long ropes from the coast. It didn't succeed due to it being too cumbersome.

The second model was built with a clock mechanism as the engine for the propeller. The explosives were in the stern and were ignited through a pistol-like control, which in turn was activated through the bow, the sides or the mast. It had two rudders: one turned to the right, the other to the left, that were moved by ropes/wires from land. After numerous experiments, this design, marked '6 m', finally performed but not well enough. He nicknamed it 'Salvacoste', Italian for "Coastsaver".

In 1860, after Luppis had retired from the Navy, he managed to demonstrate the '6 m' design to the Emperor Franz Joseph, but the naval commission refused to accept it without better propulsion and control systems.

== The meeting with Robert Whitehead ==
In Fiume in 1864, the future mayor Giovanni de Ciotta introduced Luppis to the British machine engineer Robert Whitehead, manager of the local factory "Stabilimento Tecnico Fiumano", with whom he signed a contract to develop the 'salvacoste' further.

After looking at Luppis's previous efforts Whitehead built a model but decided that the idea was not viable. Whitehead then significantly altered the previous designs and started to think about the problem of setting off explosive charges remotely below a ship's waterline, this being far more effective than above-water bombardment. Whitehead then made a device running under water and installed an engine running on compressed air, as well as automatic guidances for the depth and direction.

On 21 December 1866 the first automobile torpedo, now named Minenschiff, was officially demonstrated in front of the Austro-Hungarian State Naval Commission for evaluation. This model was 355 mm in diameter and 3.35 m in length, weighing 136 kg with 8 kg of explosives. The naval commission accepted it, and subsequently on 6 March 1867 the government contracted the inventors for a test production and agreed to pay all the production costs.

Whitehead retained the copyrights and even negotiated a new contract with Luppis. This however gave Whitehead full control of all future sales.

On 27 May 1867, the navy paid 200,000 forints in royalties to the inventor (Fiume being located in the Hungarian part of the Empire). The invention was generally regarded as a promising one, but in the first years of production there were not enough orders, so "Stabilimento" went through a crisis and went bankrupt in 1873.

Giovanni Luppis was given the noble title of Baron von Rammer ('the sinker') by Kaiser Franz Josef on 1 August 1869. He died in the borough (frazione) of Torriggia, in the municipality of Laglio, near Como on 11 January 1875.
