= Whitehead Mark 3 torpedo =

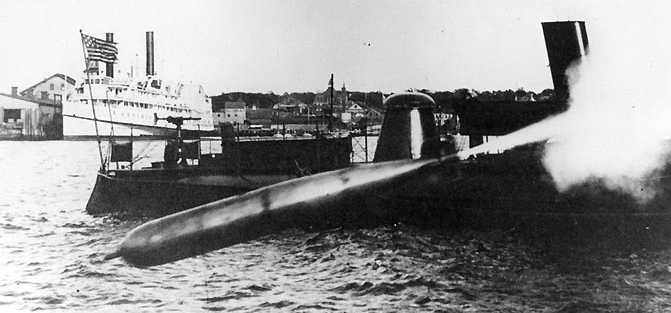
- Mark 3 Whitehead torpedo fired from East Dock, Goat Island, Newport Torpedo Station, Rhode Island, 1894
- Type: Anti-surface ship torpedo
- Place of origin: Austria-Hungary

Service history
- In service: 1898–1922
- Used by: United States Navy

Production history
- Designer: Robert Whitehead
- Designed: 1893
- Manufacturer: Torpedofabrik Whitehead & Co. E. W. Bliss Company

Specifications
- Mass: 845 pounds
- Length: 140 inches (3.55 meters)
- Diameter: 17.7 inches (45 centimeters)
- Effective firing range: 800 yards
- Warhead: wet guncotton
- Warhead weight: 118 pounds
- Detonation mechanism: War Nose Mk 1 contact exploder
- Engine: 3-cylinder
- Maximum speed: 26.5 knots
- Guidance system: gyroscope
- Launch platform: battleships and torpedo boats

The Whitehead Mark 3 torpedo was a Whitehead torpedo adopted by the United States Navy for use in an anti-surface ship role after the E. W. Bliss Company of Brooklyn, New York secured manufacturing rights in 1892.

The primary difference between the Mark 3 and the previous versions of the 3.55-meter Whiteheads was the inclusion of the Obry steering gyro for azimuth control. This device reduced the maximum deviation right or left of the target from 24 to 8 yards. About 100 Mark 3s were purchased from the E. W. Bliss Company; in 1913, these were redesignated Torpedo Type A. They were used on submarines of the A, B, C and D classes. These were withdrawn from service use in 1922 when all torpedoes designed before the Bliss-Leavitt Mark 7 torpedo were condemned.

== Characteristics ==
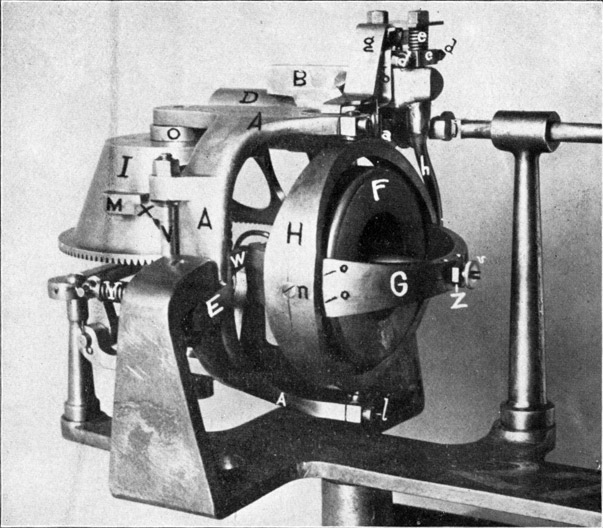
Obry gyroscopic gear installed in the Mark 3; the gyroscope itself is labelled F, G and H

The Mark 3 was ordinarily assembled into three sections: the warhead, the air flask and the after-body. The warhead's charge of wet guncotton weighed 118 pounds. The Mark 3 was what was known as a "cold-running" torpedo. The three-cylinder engine ran on cold, compressed air which was stored in the air flask. The after-body carried the engine and the tail, which contained the propellers.

The Mark 3 was launched from battleships and torpedo boats.

== See also ==
- American 18-inch torpedo
