= Pendulum-and-hydrostat control =

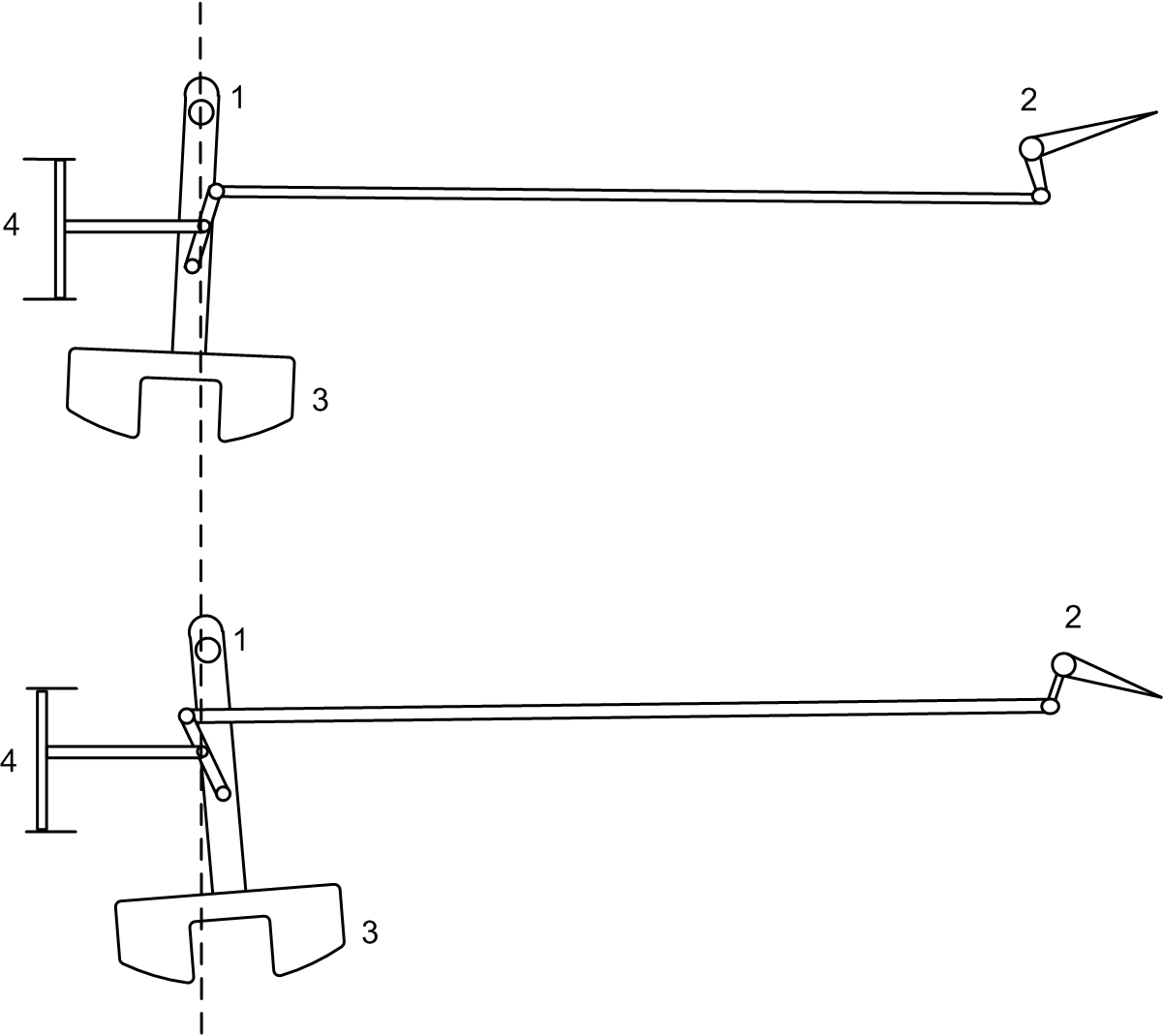
A pendulum-and-hydrostat control: 1. Pendulum pivot; 2. Elevator and fixed pivot; 3. Pendulum weight; 4. Hydrostat pressure valve

Pendulum-and-hydrostat control is a control mechanism developed originally for depth control of the Whitehead torpedo. It is an early example of what is now known as proportional and derivative control.

The hydrostat is a mechanism that senses pressure; the torpedo's depth is proportional to pressure. However, with only a hydrostat controlling the depth fins in a negative feedback loop, the torpedo tends to oscillate around the desired depth rather than settling to the desired depth. The addition of a pendulum allows the torpedo to sense the pitch of the torpedo. The pitch information is combined with the depth information to set the torpedo's depth control fins. The pitch information provides a damping term to the depth control response and suppresses the depth oscillations.

== Operation ==
In control theory the effect of the addition of the pendulum can be explained as turning the simple proportional controller into a proportional-derivative controller since the depth keeping is not controlled by the depth alone anymore but also by the derivative (rate of change) of the depth which is roughly proportional to the angle of the machine. The relative gain of the proportional and derivative functions could be altered by adjusting the linkages.

It was mainly used to control the depth of torpedoes until the end of the Second World War, and it reduced depth errors from ±12 m (40 feet) to as little as ±0.15 m (6 inches).

The pendulum and hydrostat control was invented by Robert Whitehead. It was an important advance in torpedo technology, and it was nicknamed "The Secret".
