= Ludwig Obry =

- Born: 1852
- Died: 1942 (aged 89–90)
- Engineering career
- Significant design: Developed the first gyroscopic device for steering a torpedo

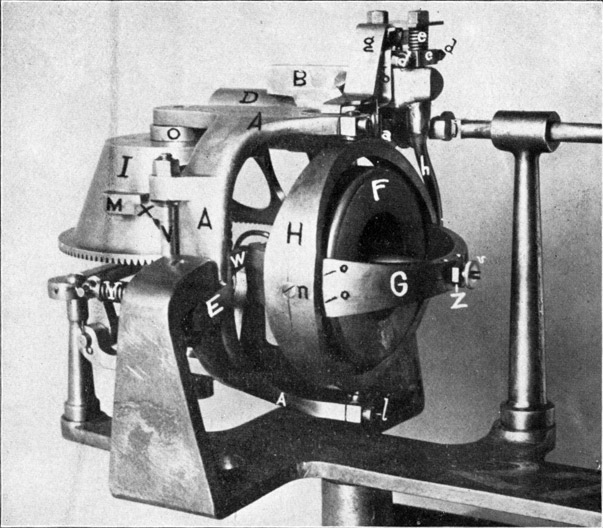
Ludwig Obry's gyroscopic mechanism for steering a Whitehead torpedo, called the "Obry Gear" by the US Navy

Ludwig Obry was an Austrian engineer and naval officer of the Austrian Navy who invented a gyroscopic device for steering a torpedo in 1895.

The gyroscope had been invented by Leon Foucault in 1851, but industry ignored the device for nearly 50 years. In 1895 or 1896, Obry rediscovered Foucault's device and adapted it into a mechanism for steering a torpedo. This increased the weapon's accuracy from hundreds to thousands of yards. Obry then patented his device and sold the rights to Robert Whitehead, who incorporated the mechanism into the Whitehead torpedo. The device consisted of a bronze wheel weighing less than 1.5 pounds that was spun by an air jet.

Obry's device was notable for solving many problems; how to get the gyroscope to begin rotating as quickly as possible, how to direct the vertical rudders and how to maintain the fast rotation of the rotor.
