= Robert Whitehead (engineer) =

English engineer (1823–1905)

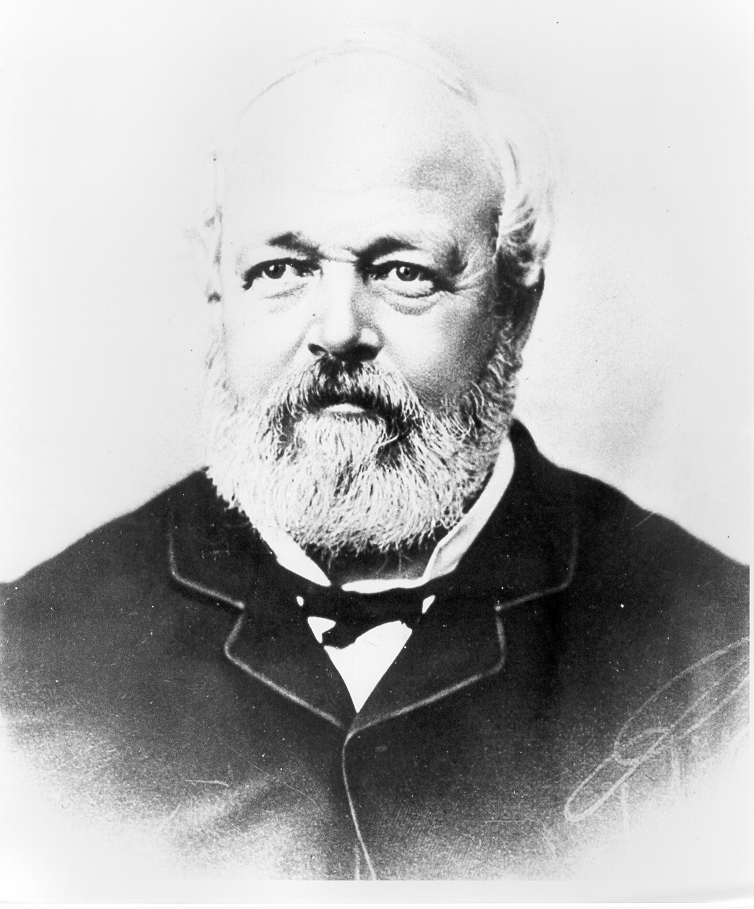
- Born: 3 January 1823; Bolton, Lancashire, England, UK
- Died: 14 November 1905 (aged 82); Shrivenham, Oxfordshire, England, UK
- Citizenship: England
- Spouse: Frances Maria Johnston
- Children: Frances Eleanor Whitehead; Alice C Whitehead; John Whitehead; Sir James Beethom Whitehead; Robert B Whitehead
- Engineering career
- Projects: Developed the first self-propelled torpedo

Robert Whitehead (3 January 1823 – 14 November 1905) was an English engineer who was most famous for developing the first effective self-propelled naval torpedo.

== Early life ==
He was born in Bolton, England, the son of James Whitehead, a cotton-bleacher, and his wife Ellen Whitehead née Swift. He trained as an engineer and draughtsman, and attended the Mechanics' Institute, Manchester.

His first professional employment was at a shipyard in Toulon, France, for Philip Taylor & Sons, and then as a consultant engineer in Milan, Italy. He then moved to Trieste, on the Adriatic coast of Austria.

Whitehead's work in Trieste was noticed by the owners of Fonderia Metalli, a metal foundry in the nearby city of Fiume (today Rijeka, Croatia). In 1856, Whitehead became manager of the company, and changed its name to Stabilimento Tecnico di Fiume (STF). STF produced marine steam boilers and engines, which were the most modern products of that era. The Austrian Navy was a customer.

== Meeting Luppis ==
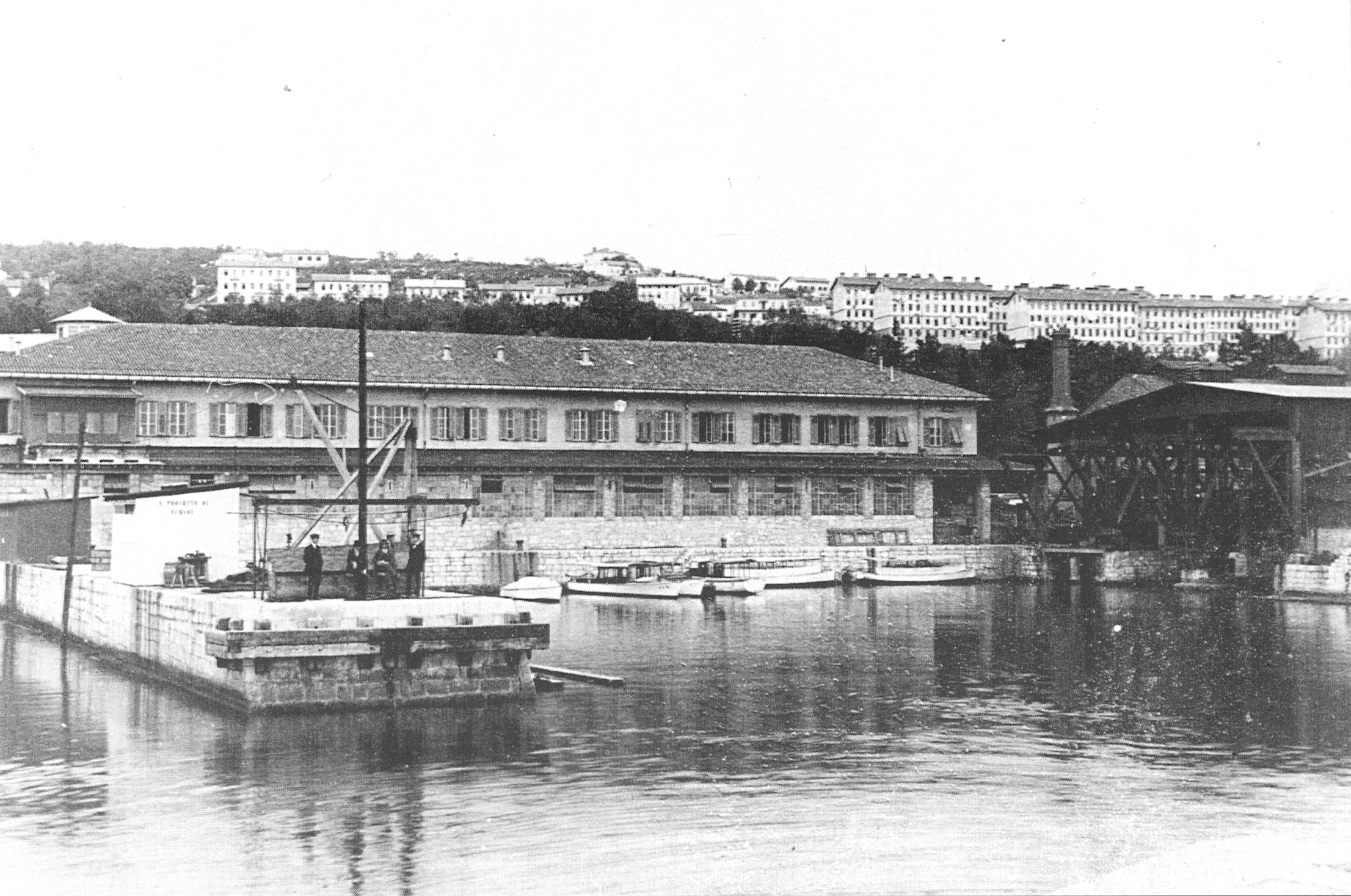
Whitehead Torpedo and Ship-factory in Fiume, 1910

In the early 1860s, Whitehead met engineer Giovanni Luppis, who had recently retired to Trieste from the Austrian Navy. Luppis had produced the first prototypes of a self-propelled torpedo in 1860, which he called the Salvacoste (lit. 'coast saviour'). Luppis' device was a low-profile surface boat, propelled by compressed air, and controlled by ropes from the land. Whitehead and Luppis formed a partnership to perfect the torpedo as an effective weapon.

== The first torpedo ==
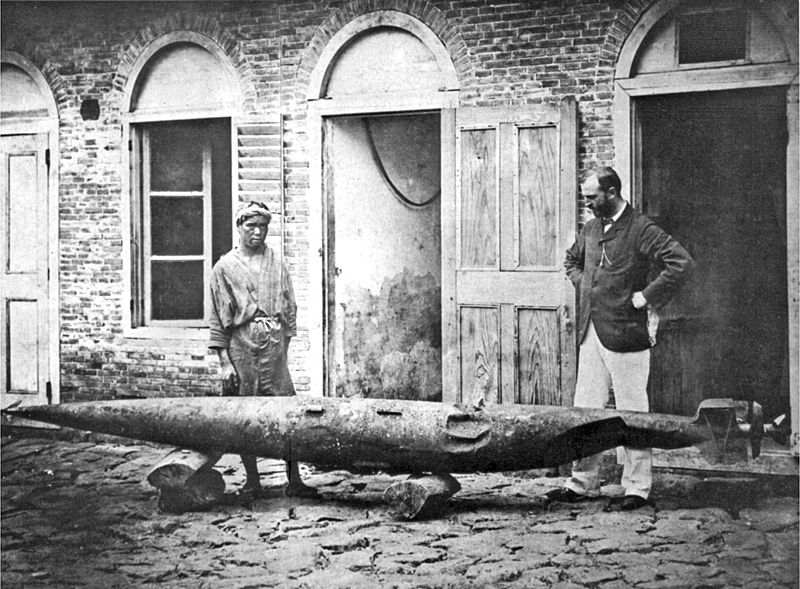
Robert Whitehead (right) and his son (left) with a battered test torpedo in Fiume, Austria-Hungary c.1875

Whitehead's initial torpedo experiments were conducted with the help of his 12-year-old son, John, and a workman, Annibale Ploech. They discarded Luppis' concept of shore launch and control for an unguided weapon launched from a ship on a straight line at the target which became known as the Whitehead torpedo.

This resulted in Minenschiff, the first self-propelled (locomotive) torpedo, officially presented to the Austrian Imperial Naval commission on 21 December 1866. The commission was impressed and the Austrian gunboat Gemse was adapted for launching torpedoes at the Schiavon shipyard in Fiume. The ship was equipped with a launching barrel, which was Whitehead's invention. More than 50 launch trials were performed in front of the factory, in Fiume harbour bay. Gemse's commander, Frigate Lieutenant Count Georg Anton von Hoyos, later married Whitehead's daughter Alice.

By 1870, Whitehead had managed to increase the torpedo's speed to 7 knots (13 km/h) and it could hit a target 700 yards (640 m) away. The torpedo was driven by a small reciprocating engine run by compressed air.

=== Key innovations ===
Whitehead added two important features to the torpedo:

- A self-regulating device that kept the torpedo at a constant preset depth. This consisted of a hydrostatic valve and pendulum balance, connected to a horizontal rudder, which controlled the running depth.
- Gyroscopic stabilisation to fix the torpedo's direction. In 1898, Whitehead purchased the newly invented gyroscope mechanism from Ludwig Obry, who was also a naval officer.

Whitehead fiercely guarded his trade secrets; employees were often sworn to secrecy about the guidance mechanisms employed in his torpedoes.

== Whitehead & Co. ==
Though the product was promising, the torpedo did not produce profits for Stabilimento Tecnico di Fiume, which went bankrupt in 1873. In 1875, Whitehead reorganised the company as Torpedo-Fabrik von Robert Whitehead, later Whitehead & Co., Societa in Azioni, which would maintain a factory in Fiume until 1945.

In 1890 Whitehead opened a UK manufacturing and test site in Portland Harbour, Dorset.

When Whitehead retired, the Whitehead family sold the company to two large British armaments companies, Vickers and Armstrong-Whitworth. Thus the company remained under British control until the First World War.

== UBAG Corporation ==
In 1915, the Whitehead company established one of its largest enterprises, the Hungarian Submarine Building Corporation (German: Ungarische Unterseebootsbau AG, or UBAG) in Rijeka.

SM U-XX, SM U-XXI, SM U-XXII and SM U-XXIII type diesel-electric submarines were produced in Rijeka.

== Use of the torpedo ==
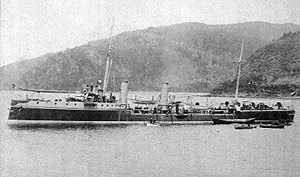
Chilean torpedo gunboat Almirante Lynch

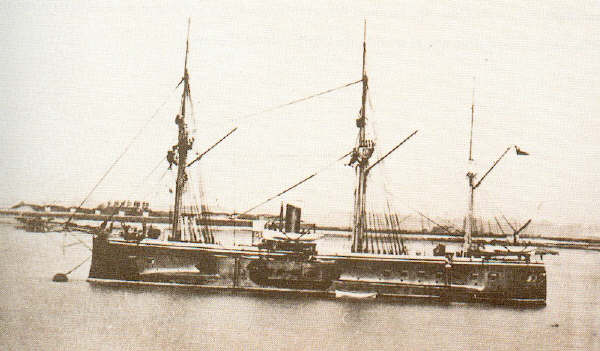
Frigate Blanco Encalada

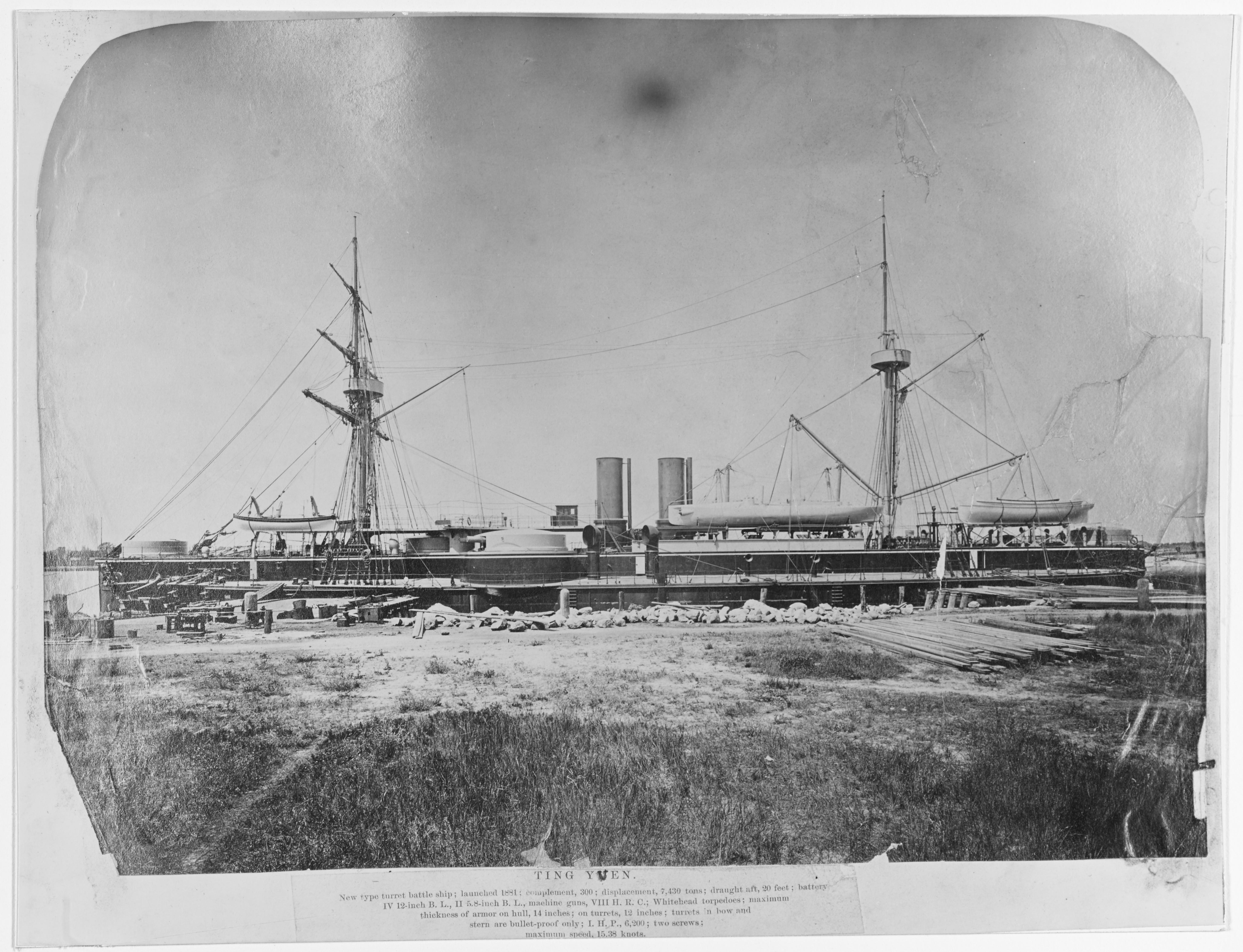
Chinese battleship Dingyuan

Most of the world's major navies took note of the development of this device by the late 1880s. Even the extremely reduced post-Civil War United States Navy was involved in torpedo development; and established a Naval Torpedo Station in Newport, Rhode Island, in 1870.

The first vessel sunk by self-propelled torpedoes was the Turkish steamer Intibah, on 16 January 1878, during the Russo-Turkish War of 1877–78. She was hit by torpedoes launched from torpedo boats operating from the tender Velikiy Knyaz Konstantin under the command of Stepan Osipovich Makarov.

Three naval actions during the late nineteenth century changed the world navies' perception of the torpedo:

1. During the 1891 Chilean Civil War, the Chilean vessel Almirante Lynch, torpedoed and sank in port the rebel frigate Blanco Encalada with a 14-inch (360 mm) Whitehead torpedo at a range of 100 yards.
2. In 1894, in the Revolta da Armada, the rebel Brazilian vessel Aquidaban was torpedoed and sunk at night while moored in a roadstead by the Brazilian torpedo gunboat Gustavo Sampaio with a 14-inch (360 mm) Schwartzkopff torpedo, and was perhaps also torpedoed by the torpedo boat Affonso Pedro.
3. In 1895, during the Sino-Japanese War, the Chinese battleship Dingyuan was put out of action in port by multiple torpedo hits over the course of two nights by several Japanese torpedo boats.

The risks of torpedoes to the ships that carried them were shown, however, at the Battle of Santiago de Cuba, in July 1898, when the Spanish cruiser Vizcaya was severely damaged by a shell hit that detonated one of her internally mounted bow torpedoes while it lay armed in its above-water tube. The USS Texas, which also fought in the battle, had its bow and stern tubes removed before the war under just such a concern. One of the major concerns of the US Navy in the Santiago campaign was Spanish torpedoes. All ships during the blockade of Santiago, despite the heat and to the great discomfiture of their crews, kept their portholes shut to delay sinking if the ships were struck by torpedoes or mines.

During Operation Weserübung in 1940, the German invasion of Denmark and Norway, the German heavy cruiser Blücher, already crippled by fire from shore batteries, was hit by two Whitehead torpedoes launched from fixed, shore-mounted tubes in Oscarsborg Fortress in Norway, and later sank. Whitehead's invention of the torpedo was a key development in naval history.

== Heritage ==
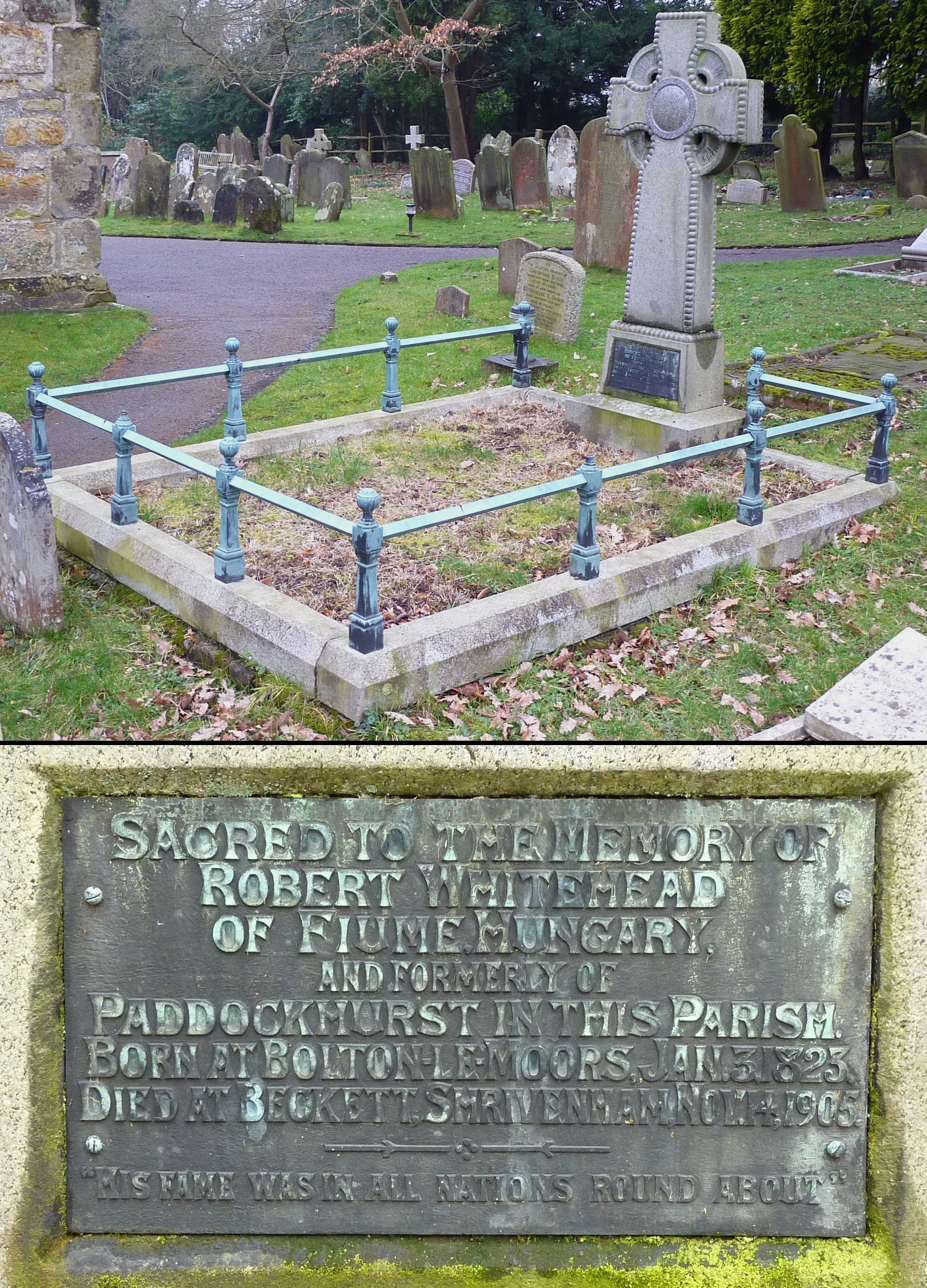
The grave of Robert Whitehead at St Nicholas' Church, Worth, West Sussex, England, pictured in 2013

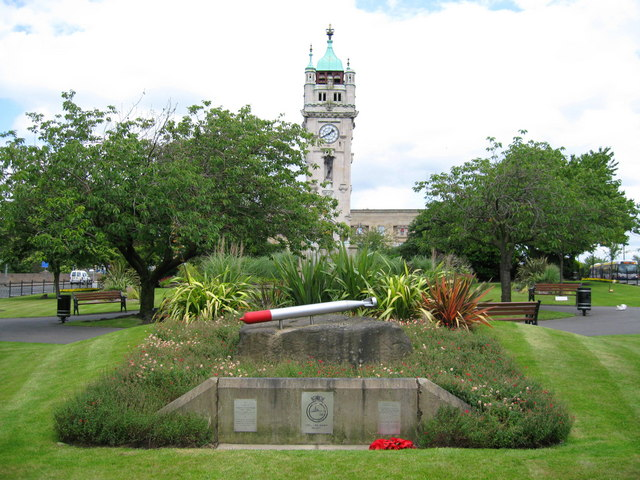
The clock tower commemorating Walter Whitehead in Bury. The torpedo in the foreground commemorates his relative, Robert.

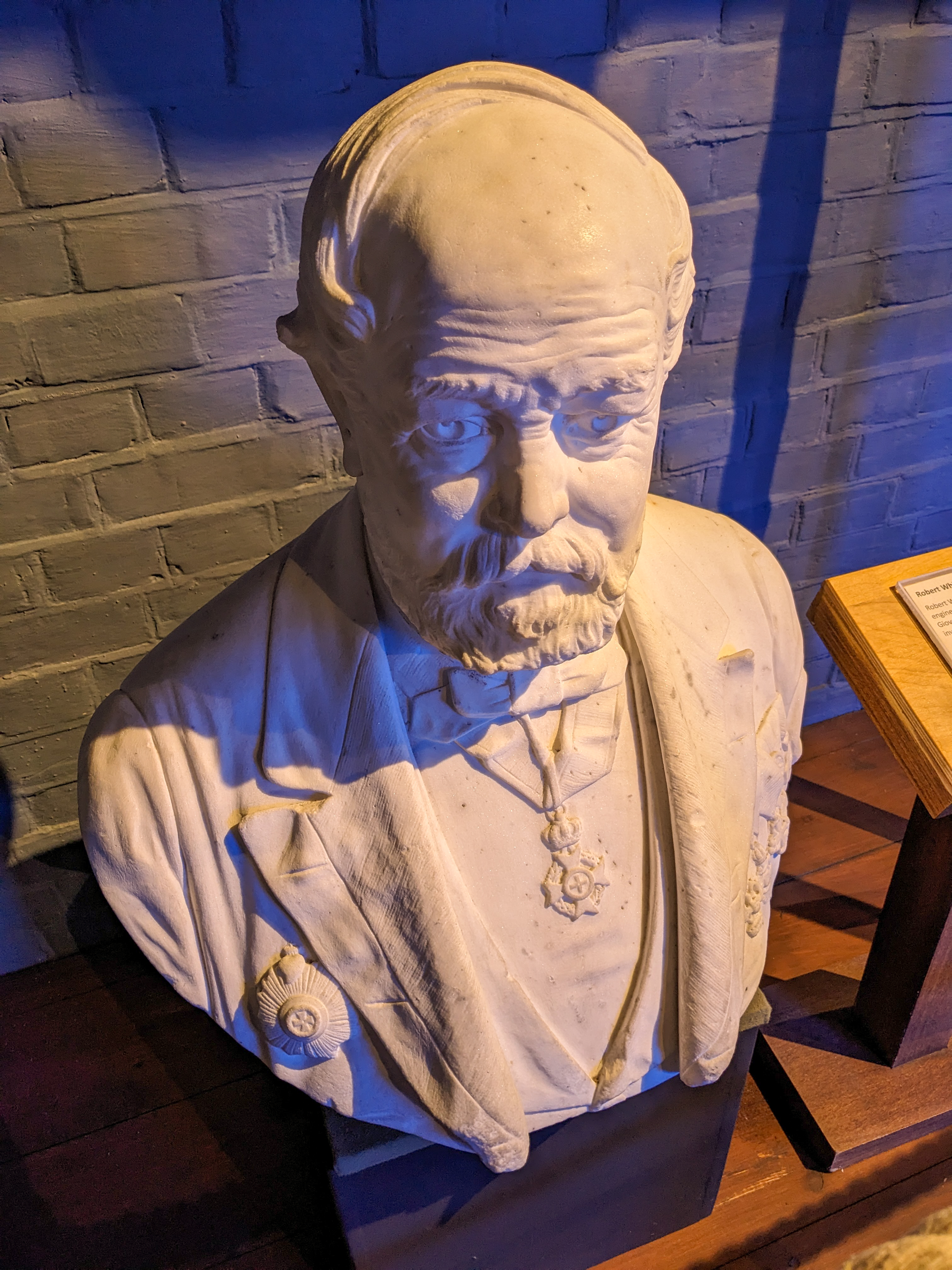
Bust of Robert Whitehead at Explosion Museum of Naval Firepower

Whitehead was a devout Christian and a supporter of the temperance movement. In the early 1880s, he gave £1000 to Agnes Weston, who was attempting to buy and repurpose two public houses in Devonport, expressing his hope that the gift "would knock a hole in one of them". He left his fortune to his granddaughter Agathe Whitehead.

Whitehead is buried at the Parish Church of St Nicholas, Worth in Crawley, West Sussex. His epitaph reads "His fame was in all nations round about". Kozala Cemetery in Rijeka is home to the Whitehead Family Mausoleum.

The Torpedo Research Vessel RMAS Whitehead (built by Scotts, launched 1970, sold 1993) was named in his honour.

== Descendants ==
Whitehead married Frances Maria Johnson (1821–1883), daughter of James Johnson and Ann Boville

He died in 1905 at Beckett Hall, Shrivenham, Berkshire, a country house he had leased from Viscount Barrington.

The couple's children include:

- Alice Whitehead, who married Georg Anton, Count of Hoyos (1842–1904), and had issue.
  - Countess Marguerite of Hoyos married Prince Herbert von Bismarck, and from them descend most of the Bismarck family of today.
  - Alexander, Count of Hoyos.
- Cavaliere (Knight) John Whitehead (1854–1902) married Countess Agathe Gobertina von Breunner (1856–1945), Austro-Hungarian nobility, and had issue:
  - Agathe Whitehead was the heiress of her grandfather's fortune. She had seven children with her husband Georg von Trapp. Captain von Trapp remarried after her death and became famous as the patriarch of the von Trapp Family Singers who were portrayed in the semi-fictional stage play and movie The Sound of Music.
- Sir James Beethom Whitehead (1858–1928), diplomat, who married on 15 April 1896 the Hon. Marian Cecilia Brodrick, youngest daughter of the 8th Viscount Midleton, and had issue seven children including:
  - John William St John Whitehead (1901–1984), stockbroker and pre-WWII amateur aviator
  - Sir Edgar Cuthbert Fremantle Whitehead (1905–1971), who became Prime Minister of Southern Rhodesia
  - Hugh Laurence James Whitehead (d. 27 December 1945 in London).
- Robert Boville Whitehead (1877–1945), who married and had issue
- Frances Eleanor Whitehead (d. 1900) who married Admiral Sir Charles Carter Drury

== See also ==
- Walter Whitehead
