= Speed record =

World record for speed

A speed record is a world record for speed by a person, animal, or vehicle. The function of speed record is to record the speed of moving animate objects such as humans, animals or vehicles.

== Overall speed record ==
Overall speed record is the record for the highest average speed regardless of any criteria, categories or classes that all the more specific records belong to, provided that the route was completed. It helps to compare various performances that differ by the type of the craft, vessel or vehicle, the departure and the arrival points (provided that the distances are comparable), number, age and gender of the crew members, departure date, etc. The distance used for calculating the overall speed record is usually the distance in a straight line. In the case of man-powered races, overall speed record doesn't always reflect the best performance. It is highly dependent on technological advantages generating the speed of the craft, vessel or vehicle.

Term Overall Speed Record is also used to compare the highest momentary speed achieved by a vehicle, vessel or craft in the highest land speed, water speed or air speed contest.

== Vehicle speed records ==
In the air

- Flight airspeed record
- Cross-America flight air speed record
- Manned spacecraft speed record

On land

- Land speed record
- Land speed record for rail vehicles
- List of fastest production cars
- Motorcycle land-speed record
- Fastest speed on a bicycle
- British land speed record

In the water

- Water speed record
- Speed sailing record
- Underwater speed record

== Natural speed records ==
- List of world records in athletics
  - List of speed skating records
  - Fastest known time
- Fastest animals

== See also ==
- Orders of magnitude (speed)
- Transport
- Transportation engineering
- Energy efficiency in transport
