= Underwater speed records =

Underwater speed record include records for submarines, autonomous underwater vehicles, and torpedoes. As these are typically for military vehicles, most are unconfirmed.

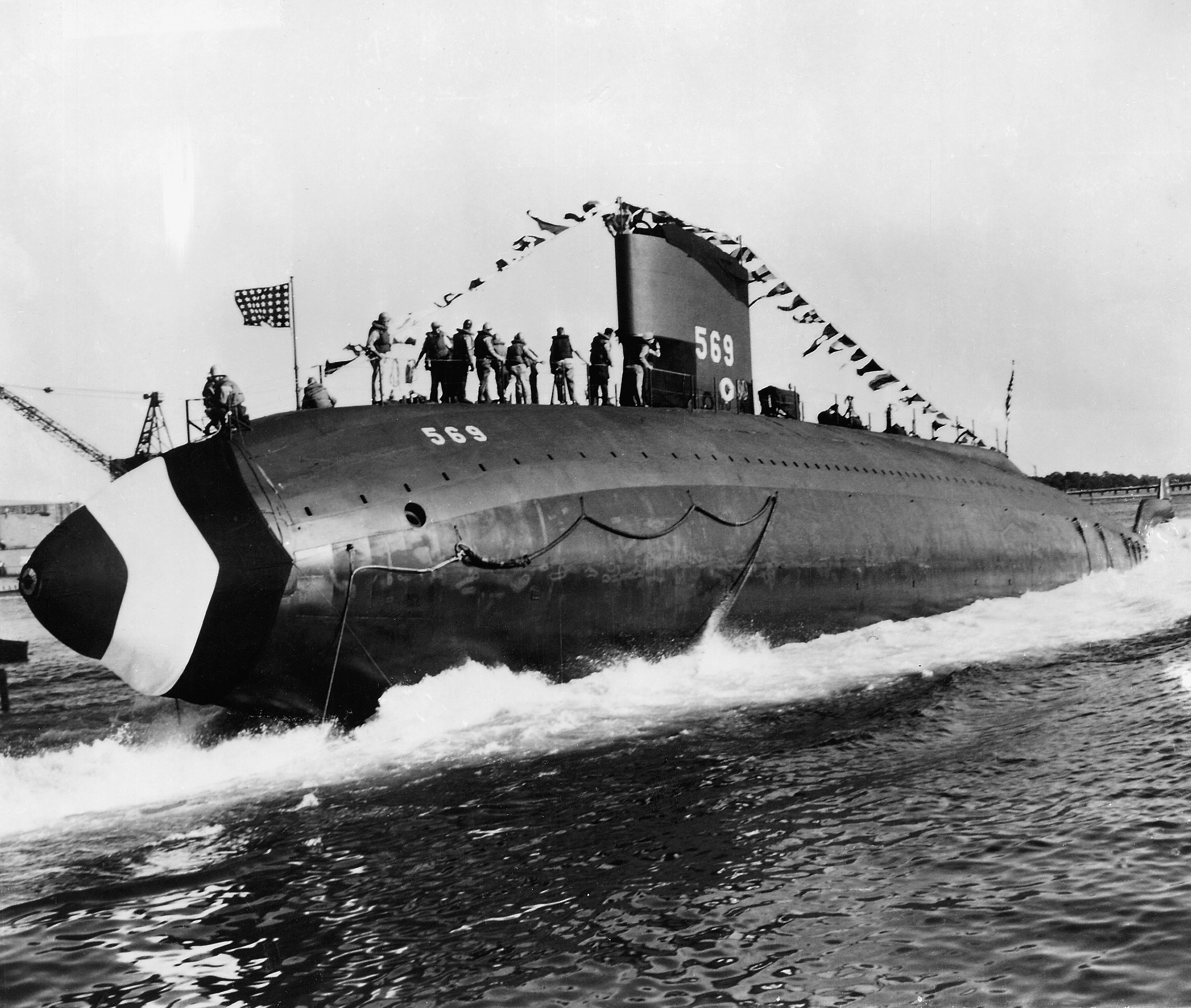
The USS Albacore, with its teardrop hull, is claimed to have reached an underwater speed of 33 knots (61 km/h; 38 mph).

== Submarines ==
Established reports and manufacturer's claims indicate that a handful of submarines are capable of speeds exceeding 30 knots (56 km/h; 35 mph). In 1960, HMS Explorer S30 achieved an underwater speed of over 30 knots. In 1965, the experimental USS Albacore reported a speed of 33 knots (61 km/h; 38 mph). The Soviet November-class submarine was found in 1968 to have a speed of 31 knots (57 km/h; 36 mph). In response the United States Navy developed the Los Angeles-class submarine, with a reported speed of 30–32 knots (56–59 km/h; 35–37 mph). The Akula (Russian: shark)-class vessel is reportedly capable of travelling submerged at 35 knots (65 km/h; 40 mph). Its predecessor, the Alfa class, could attain short speed bursts of 40–45 knots (74–83 km/h; 46–52 mph) while submerged. There are also claims that the Soviet twin-propeller submarine K-222, with titanium inner and outer hulls, reached 44.7 knots (83 km/h; 51 mph), fully submerged, during sea trials in 1969.

== Torpedoes ==
The British Spearfish torpedo, designed to counter high-speed Russian submarines such as the Alfa class, is reputed to reach speeds in excess of 70 knots (130 km/h; 81 mph). The Russian VA-111 Shkval rocket-powered supercavitating torpedo is reportedly capable of speeds over 200 knots (370 km/h; 230 mph). The Germans had a prototype torpedo, Barracuda, allegedly capable of reaching 220 knots (400 km/h).
