= Orders of magnitude (speed) =

Comparison of a wide range of speeds

The orders of magnitude of speed is a comparative list of various speed levels spanning many scales of measurement, ranging from the near-imperceptible expansion of space under Hubble's law to the ultimate physical limit of the speed of light. Speeds across this range are encountered in natural phenomena, human-made objects, biological processes, and fundamental physics. To help compare different orders of magnitude, the following list describes various speed levels between approximately 2.2×10^{−18} m/s and 3.0×10^{8} m/s (the speed of light). The list is organized by orders of magnitude, grouping entries by successive powers of ten. Values in bold are exact.

== List of orders of magnitude for speed ==
Factor (m/s)	Value (m/s)	Value (km/h)	Value (mph)	Value (c)	Item
10^{−18}	2.2×10^{−18}	7.8×10^{−18}	4.9×10^{−18}	7.3×10^{−27}	Expansion rate between 2 points in free space 1 m apart under Hubble's law.
10^{−14}	1.4×10^{−14}	5.0×10^{−14}	3.1×10^{−14}	4.7×10^{−23}	Cave of the Crystals gypsum crystals' growth rate, the slowest directly measured normal growth rate for any crystal growth process.
10^{−14}	3.169×10^{−14}	1.141×10^{−13}	7.089×10^{−14}	1.057×10^{−22}	1 Bubnoff unit (1 μm/yr)
10^{−13}	1×10^{−13}	3×10^{−13}	2×10^{−13}	3×10^{−22}	Rate of erosion of bedrock.
10^{−12}	4.12×10^{−12}	1.48×10^{−11}	9.21×10^{−12}	1.37×10^{−20}	Average growth rate of a limestone stalactite.
10^{−11}	9.8×10^{−11}	3.5×10^{−10}	2.2×10^{−10}	3.2×10^{−19}	Rate of global sea level rise in 1993–2003 (3.1 mm/yr).
10^{−10}	3×10^{−10} to 3×10^{−9}	1×10^{−9} to 1×10^{−8}	7×10^{−10} to 7×10^{−9}	1×10^{−18} to 1×10^{−17}	Typical relative speed of continental drift.
10^{−9}	1.3×10^{−9}	4.7×10^{−9}	2.9×10^{−9}	4.3×10^{−18}	Average rate of the Moon receding from the Earth (approx. 38 mm/yr).
10^{−9}	4.8×10^{−9}	1.7×10^{−8}	1.1×10^{−8}	1.6×10^{−17}	Human hair growth (average rate—note that there is a great range of variation).
10^{−7}	3×10^{−7} to 1.11×10^{−5}	1.08×10^{−6} to 4×10^{−5}	6.7×10^{−7} to 2.5×10^{−5}	1×10^{−15} to 3.7×10^{−14}	Calculated speed of an amoeba.
10^{−6}	1.52×10^{−6}	5.4×10^{−6}	3.4×10^{−6}	5.1×10^{−15}	Speed of a cellular vesicle propelled by a motor protein.
10^{−5}	1.02×10^{−5}	3.67×10^{−5}	2.28×10^{−5}	3.40×10^{−14}	Speed of the tip of a 7 cm (2.8 in)-long hour hand on a clock.
10^{−5}	1.4×10^{−5}	5.0×10^{−5}	3.1×10^{−5}	4.6×10^{−14}	Growth rate of bamboo, the fastest-growing woody plant, over 24 hours.
10^{−4}	4.0×10^{−4}	1.4×10^{−3}	8.9×10^{−4}	1.3×10^{−12}	Speed of Jakobshavn Isbræ, one of the fastest glaciers, in 2003.
10^{−4}	6×10^{−4}	2.2×10^{−3}	1.3×10^{−3}	2×10^{−12}	Typical speed of Thiovulum majus, the fastest-swimming bacterium.
10^{−3}	0.00178	0.00641	0.00398	5.94×10^{−12}	The speed of a particle orbiting a ball of lead of radius 1 meter near its surface under its gravity (that is, the first cosmic speed for this ball).
10^{−3}	0.00275	0.00990	0.00615	9.17×10^{−12}	World record speed of the fastest snail in the Congham, UK.
10^{−2}	0.0476	0.171	0.106	1.58×10^{−10}	Compact cassette tape speed.
10^{−2}	0.080	0.29	0.18	2.6×10^{−10}	The top speed of a sloth.
10^{−1}	0.2778	**1**	0.6214	9.2657×10^{−10}	1 km/h.
10^{−1}	**0.44704**	**1.609344**	**1**	1.4912×10^{−9}	1 mph.
10^{−1}	0.5144	**1.852**	1.151	1.716×10^{−9}	1 knot (nautical mile per hour)
10^{0}	1.2	4.32	2.68	4×10^{−9}	Typical scanning speed of an audio compact disc; the speed of signals (action potentials) traveling along axons in the human cortex.
10^{0}	1–1.5	3.6–5.4	2.2–3.4	3.3–5.0×10^{−9}	Average walking speed—below a speed of about 2 m/s, it is more efficient to walk than to run, but above that speed, it is more efficient to run.
10^{0}	2.39	8.53	5.35	7.97×10^{−9}	Average speed implied by the world record time for the 50-metre freestyle swim.
10^{0}	5.78	20.81	12.93	1.928×10^{−8}	World record time marathon
10^{0}	6–7	20–25	12–15	1.8–2.3×10^{−8}	Comfortable bicycling speed.
10^{1}	10.438	37.578	23.35	3.48×10^{−8}	Average speed of Jamaican athlete Usain Bolt while setting the 100-meter world record in Berlin on 16 August 2009.
10^{1}	12.42	44.72	27.78	4.14×10^{−8}	Top speed reached by Bolt during the same race.
10^{1}	8–14	30–50	18–31	2.7–4.7×10^{−8}	Typical residential speed limit; top speed of a running cat or dog.
10^{1}	14	50	31	4.7×10^{−8}	Typical speed of road-race cyclist.
10^{1}	17	60	37	5×10^{−8}	Typical speed of thoroughbred racehorse or racing greyhound.
10^{1}	5–25	18–90	11–56	1.7–8.3×10^{−8}	Speed of propagation for unmyelinated sensory neurons.
10^{1}	30	110	70	1×10^{−7}	Typical speed of car (freeway); cheetah; sailfish; speed of go-fast boat.
10^{1}	40	140	90	1.3×10^{−7}	Typical peak speed of a local service train (or intercity on lower standard tracks).
10^{1}	40.05	144.17	89.59	1.335×10^{−7}	Land speed record for a human powered vehicle.
10^{1}	54	195	122	1.8×10^{−7}	Maximum speed a human can attain during a face-down free-fall.
10^{1}	67	240	149	2.2×10^{−7}	The top speed of the world's fastest roller coaster, Formula Rossa.
10^{1}	90	320	200	3×10^{−7}	Typical speed of a modern high-speed train (e.g. latest generation of production TGV); a diving peregrine falcon—fastest bird; 320 km/h or 200 mph is a parameter sometimes used in defining a supercar.
10^{1}	91	328	204	3.04×10^{−7}	Fastest recorded ball (a golf ball) in sports.
10^{2}	100.67	362.4	225.18	3.3×10^{−7}	Maximum speed recorded by a MotoGP motorcycle. Set by Johann Zarco during the 2021 Qatar Grand Prix at Losail International Circuit in a Ducati Desmosedici GP21 and Brad Binder during the 2021 Italian Grand Prix at Mugello Circuit in a KTM RC16.
10^{2}	103	370	230	3.44×10^{−7}	Speed of super torpedo VA-111 Shkval.
10^{2}	103.5	372.6	231.5	3.452×10^{−7}	Maximum speed recorded by a Formula One car. Set by Juan Pablo Montoya during the 2005 Italian Grand Prix at Monza in a McLaren MP4-20.
10^{2}	105.5	379.8	236	3.52×10^{−7}	Maximum speed of a Ferrari F50 GT1.
10^{2}	113	408	254	3.77×10^{−7}	Fastest non-tornadic wind gust recorded on Earth - at Barrow Island, Australia on April 10, 1996, during Severe Tropical Cyclone Olivia.
10^{2}	120	432	270	4.0×10^{−7}	Speed of propagation for mammalian motor neurons.
10^{2}	124.219	447.19	277.87	4.1×10^{−7}	Maximum speed of the Koenigsegg Agera RS (currently the fastest production car in the world).
10^{2}	126–143	452–517	281–321	4.2–4.8×10^{−7}	The fastest wind speed ever recorded on Earth, caused by the 1999 Bridge Creek–Moore tornado.
10^{2}	150.6	539	337	5×10^{−7}	Top speed of an internal-combustion-powered NHRA Top Fuel Dragster.
10^{2}	154	554.4	344.5	5.1×10^{−7}	Speed of the fastest crossbow arrow.
10^{2}	156.9	565	351.1	5.2×10^{−7}	Speed of the fastest badminton shuttlecock.
10^{2}	159.7	574.8	357.2	5.3×10^{−7}	Top speed of experimental test TGV train in 2007.
10^{2}	161	580	360	5.4×10^{−7}	Top speed of JR-Maglev in 2003.
10^{2}	250	900	560	8.3×10^{−7}	Typical cruising speed of a modern jet airliner, e.g. an Airbus A380.
10^{2}	314	1,130	702	1×10^{−6}	Top speed of any World War II-era aircraft, the Me 163B V18 set on July 6, 1944.
10^{2}	320	1,200	720	1.07×10^{−6}	The speed of a typical .22 LR bullet.
10^{2}	340.3	1,225	761	1.135×10^{−6}	Speed of sound in standard atmosphere (15 °C and 1 atm).
10^{2}	344.66	1,240.77	770.98	1.15×10^{−6}	Max speed reached by the jet-propelled car ThrustSSC in 1997—Land speed record.
10^{2}	373	1,342.8	833.9	1.2×10^{−6}	Highest speed recorded during a free fall set by Felix Baumgartner.
10^{2}	428	1,540.8	957	1.4×10^{−6}	Max speed of Bell X-1.
10^{2}	464	1,670	1,040	1.55×10^{−6}	Speed of Earth's rotation at the equator.
10^{2}	603	2,170.8	1,350	2×10^{−6}	Speed of the Concorde airliner.
10^{2}	975	3,510	2,180	3.25×10^{−6}	Muzzle velocity of M16 rifle.
10^{2}	981	3,532	2,194	3.27×10^{−6}	SR-71 Blackbird, the fastest aircraft driven by a mechanical jet engine.
10^{3}	1,022	3,679	2,286	3.41×10^{−6}	Mean orbital velocity of the Moon around Earth.
10^{3}	1,400	5,040	3,100	4.6×10^{−6}	Speed of the Space Shuttle when the solid rocket boosters separate.
10^{3}	1,422	5,119.2	3,181.2	4.7×10^{−6}	The speed of fastest commercial cartridge. (.220 Swift, 1.9 grams (29 gr) bullet and 2.7 grams (42 gr) of 3031 powder.)
10^{3}	1,500	5,400	3,400	5×10^{−6}	Speed of sound in water or in soft tissue.
10^{3}	1,789	6,443	4,002	6×10^{−6}	Speed of BrahMos II hypersonic cruise missile
10^{3}	2,000	7,200	4,500	6.7×10^{−6}	Estimated speed of a thermal neutron.
10^{3}	2,019	7,268.4	4,516	6.7×10^{−6}	Speed of the North American X-15 rocket plane.
10^{3}	2,375	8,550	5,345	7.9×10^{−6}	Escape velocity from Moon.
10^{3}	2,700	9,600	6,000	9×10^{−6}	Speed of wind on exoplanet HD 189733 b.
10^{3}	2,885	10,385	6,453	9.6×10^{−6}	Top speed of the fastest rocket sled.
10^{3}	3,373	12,144	7,546	1.125×10^{−5}	Speed of the unmanned X-43 rocket/scramjet plane.
10^{3}	4,500	16,000	10,000	1.5×10^{−5}	A typical value for the specific impulse of current rockets.
10^{3}	7,700	27,700	17,200	2.57×10^{−5}	Speed of International Space Station and typical speed of other satellites such as the Space Shuttle in low Earth orbit.
10^{3}	7,777	28,000	17,400	2.594×10^{−5}	Speed of propagation of the explosion in a detonating cord.
10^{4}	10,600	38,160	23,713.65	0.00004	Speed of propagation of the explosion of Octanitrocubane (ONC).
10^{4}	11,107	39,985.2	24,846	0.00004	Speed of Apollo 10 – high speed record for human-crewed vehicle.
10^{4}	11,200	40,320	25,100	0.00004	Escape velocity from Earth.
10^{4}	16,100	57,900	36,000	0.00005	Fastest projectile velocity (1994).
10^{4}	16,210	58,356	36,261	0.00005	Escape speed from Earth by NASA New Horizons spacecraft—Fastest escape velocity.
10^{4}	17,000	61,000	38,000	0.00006	The approximate speed of the Voyager 1 probe relative to the Sun, when it exited the Solar System.
10^{4}	29,800	107,280	66,700	0.00010	Speed of the Earth in orbit around the Sun.
10^{4}	47,800	172,100	106,900	0.00016	Atmospheric entry speed of the Galileo atmospheric probe—Fastest controlled atmospheric entry for a human-made object.
10^{4}	66,000	240,000	150,000	0.00022	Lower speed bound of the steel plate cap from the Pascal-B nuclear test of Operation Plumbbob.
10^{4}	70,220	252,800	157,100	0.00023	Speed of the Helios 2 solar probe.
10^{4}	73,800	265,000	165,000	0.00023	Estimated top speed of the Juno spacecraft (mass ~3600 kg) relative to Earth before insertion into Jupiter's orbit — second fastest human-made technical object.
10^{5}	100,000	360,000	224,000	0.0003	Dust particles in dust accelerators can exceed this speed.
10^{5}	140,000	540,000	313,170	0.00047	Approaching velocity of Messier 98 to our galaxy.
10^{5}	192,000	690,000	430,000	0.00064	Predicted top speed of the Parker Solar Probe at its closest perihelion in 2024.
10^{5}	200,000	700,000	450,000	0.00070	Orbital speed of the Solar System in the Milky Way galaxy.
10^{5}	308,571	1,080,000	694,288	0.001	Approaching velocity of Andromeda Galaxy to our galaxy.
10^{5}	369,820	1,331,400	827,260	0.0012	Current speed of the Sun, relative to the cosmic microwave background.
10^{5}	440,000	1,600,000	980,000	0.0015	Typical speed of the stepped leader of lightning (cf. return stroke below).
10^{5}	445,000	1,600,000	995,000	0.0015	Max velocity of the remaining shell (mass about 0.1 mg) of an inertial confinement fusion capsule driven by the National Ignition Facility for the 'Bigfoot' capsule campaign. Current fastest macroscopic human-made system.
10^{5}	450,000	1,600,000	1,000,000	0.0015	Typical speed of a particle of the solar wind, relative to the Sun.
10^{5}	552,000	1,990,000	1,230,000	0.0018	Speed of the Milky Way, relative to the cosmic microwave background.
10^{5}	617,700	2,224,000	1,382,000	0.0021	Escape velocity from the surface of the Sun.
10^{6}	1,000,000	3,600,000	2,200,000	0.0030	Typical speed of a Moreton wave across the surface of the Sun.
10^{6}	1,610,000	5,800,000	3,600,000	0.0054	Speed of hypervelocity star PSR B2224+65, which currently seems to be leaving the Milky Way.
10^{6}	5,000,000	18,000,000	11,000,000	0.017	Estimated minimum speed of star S2 at its closest approach to Sagittarius A*.
10^{7}	14,000,000	50,000,000	31,000,000	0.047	Typical speed of a fast neutron.
10^{7}	30,000,000	100,000,000	70,000,000	0.1	Typical speed of an electron in a cathode-ray tube.
10^{8}	100,000,000	360,000,000	220,000,000	0.3	Typical speed of the return stroke of lightning (cf. stepped leader above).
10^{8}	124,000,000	447,000,000	277,000,000	0.4	Speed of light in a diamond (Refractive index 2.417).
10^{8}	150,000,000	540,000,000	330,000,000	0.5	The escape velocity of a neutron star.
10^{8}	200,000,000	720,000,000	440,000,000	0.7	Speed of a signal in an optical fiber.
10^{8}	299,792,456	1,079,252,840	670,615,282	1 − 9×10^{−9}	Speed of the 7 TeV protons in the Large Hadron Collider at full power.
10^{8}	299,792,457.996	1,079,252,848.786	670,616,629.38	1 − 1×10^{−11}	Maximal speed of an electron in LEP (104.5 GeV).
10^{8}	299,792,458 − 1.5×10^{−15}	1,079,252,848.8 − 5.4×10^{−15}	670,616,629.4	1 − 4.9×10^{−24}	Speed of the Oh-My-God particle ultra-high-energy cosmic ray.
10^{8}	**299,792,458**	**1,079,252,848.8**	670,616,629.4	**1**	Speed of light or other electromagnetic radiation in a vacuum or massless particles.
10^{8}	>299,792,458	>1,079,252,848.8	>670,616,629.4	>1	Galaxy recession velocity outside the Hubble sphere

== See also ==
- Typical projectile speeds - also showing the corresponding kinetic energy per unit mass
- Neutron temperature
