= Superkavitierender Unterwasserlaufkörper =

German supercavitating torpedo prototype

Superkavitierender Unterwasserlaufkörper lit. Supercavitating Underwater Running Body Formerly known as Barracuda
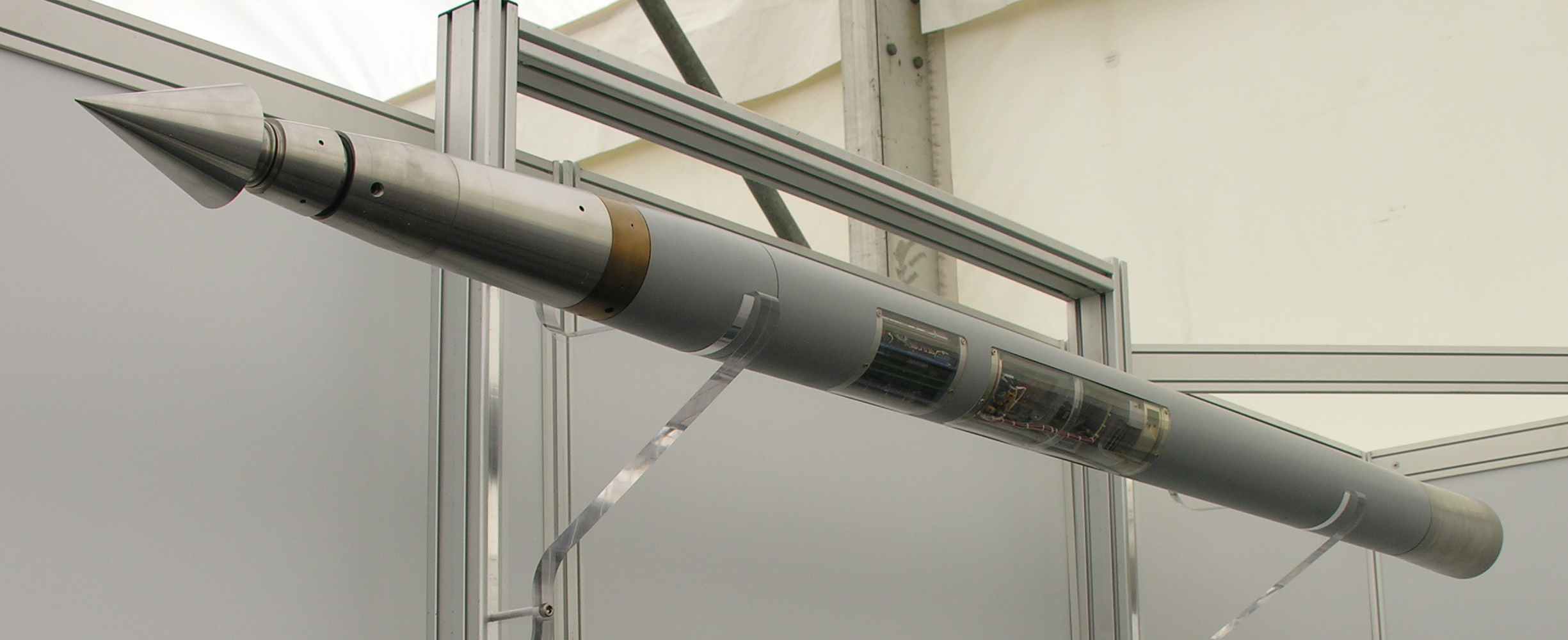
- Type: Supercavitating torpedo
- Place of origin: Germany

Service history
- In service: Prototype-only

Production history
- Designer: Diehl BGT Defence (now Diehl Defence)
- Designed: 2005
- No. built: ~12

Specifications
- Engine: Rocket engine
- Propellant: Solid fuel
- Maximum speed: 400 km/h (250 mph; 220 kn)
- Guidance system: Inertial measurement unit (IMU), sonar
- Steering system: Actuator-based conical tip
- Launch platform: Submarines, surface vessels

The Superkavitierender Unterwasserlaufkörper (lit. Supercavitating Underwater Running Body, formerly known as Barracuda) was a German close-range supercavitating torpedo technology demonstrator designed by the Diehl BGT Defence (now Diehl Defence) and developed in cooperation with the German Navy. The supercavitating torpedo for a "close-range defense of underwater targets" was presented to the public in 2005 as a prototype, but it never went into development and procurement.

This form of torpedo solves the problem of high underwater drag by means of the supercavitation effect, where underwater at a velocity of around 180 km/h (110 mph; 97 kn) a cavity filled with steam surrounds the moving object. Only the tip is in contact with the water, as such the frictional resistance is greatly reduced. The propulsion of such a torpedo can no longer be done by a propeller but requires a rocket engine.

Guidance is based on an inertial measurement unit (IMU) and a sonar antenna array integrated into the structure of the cavitation-forming conical tip located in the head section of the torpedo. Steering is performed by an autopilot that pivots this conical tip using actuators.

If the torpedo rises or falls, the water pressure acting on it also changes, and the cavitation bubble changes. When sinking, the water pressure increases and the bubble is compressed; when the torpedo rises, the pressure drops and the bubble gets bigger. To maintain the integrity of the bubble in response to increasing water pressure, the torpedo begins to pump a greater volume of gas.

According to the manufacturer, the torpedo reaches a speed of over 400 km/h (250 mph; 220 kn) underwater. It is not dependent on the launch from submarines but can dive into the water from the air and continue its supercavitation trip from there.

== See also ==
- VA-111 Shkval — comparable Soviet torpedo from 1977.
- Hoot — Iranian model reverse-engineered from the Soviet Shkval.
