= Seabright =

== Places ==
- Seabright, Nova Scotia
- Sea Bright, New Jersey

== People ==
- Charley Seabright (1918-1981), American Football player from Wheeling, West Virginia
- Paul Seabright, professor of Economics at the University of Toulouse, France
- John Michael Seabright (born 1959), United States federal judge
- Henry Seabright, magazine and children's book illustrator

== Things ==
- Seabright Lawn Tennis and Cricket Club
- Sea Bright (boat)
