= Vortex (sailboat) =

High performance sailing dinghy

The Laser Vortex is a high performance sailing dinghy designed by Jo Richards and awarded the "Sailboat of the Year" title on its introduction in 2000. It is a tunnel hulled single hander that has a trapeze and an optional asymmetrical spinnaker. It is manufactured by White Formula UK Ltd under licence from a consortium headed up by Jonathan Carter. Jo Richard remains the owner of the design. Laser Performance are no longer involved with the Vortex. In 2013 the decision was made to drop 'Laser' from the name, the boat is now known only as the Vortex.

The development of the Asymmetric 'kit' by Association Chairman and Vortex enthusiast Keith Escritt has brought new life to the class, with over 100 boats now flying the asymmetric option.

In handicap racing the Vortex sails off a Portsmouth Yardstick of 925 in the UK (960 without spinnaker) and 86.8 in the USA .
