= Jersey Skiff =

Boat used for sport fishing

The Jersey Skiff is a boat that was once popular for sport fishing in the United States. They were introduced by fishermen on the Jersey Shore, and were originally designed to be launched from the beach through the surf, so they could tend their fishing nets offshore.

They first appeared around the end of the 19th century. There were two distinct versions, along the Northern Jersey Shore, The Sea Bright, and the Southern Shore, Jersey Skiff. In the early 20th century Jersey Skiffs were employed by early coast guardsmen and lifeguards. The boats had evolved into wreckage and salvage work as well as fishing uses. The primary difference between the two boats is the addition of a board on the side of the Jersey Skiff for slightly greater freeboard. Also the hull is slightly narrower for better rowing. And the transom of Jersey Skiff is more of a wine glass shape which integrates into the skeg, whereas The Sea Bright transom does not. The skeg can be added as an additional board.

The design characteristics of the boat, are a stem that is slightly raked, less than a Dory and more than a Whitehall Rowboat. The stern was in a heart or wine glass shape with a rake toward the center of the boat. This allows the boat to be retrieved through the surf bow first. Although it is reported that in rougher conditions the boat is beached stern first. The boats are of fairly shallow draft and have a narrow flat bottom which is useful for sitting on the beach. Although the sides are generally rounded, without a keel but with a small skeg for tracking.

The boats were generally outfitted with a sprit or lug sailing rig and a small jib. The mast was generally unstayed. Early fisherman used an oar to steer with rather than bring a separate rudder. Modern sailing versions come with a separate rudder. But an oarlock can be mounted on the transom for use with an oar as a steering device.

The first trans Atlantic passage by a rowboat was made by George Herbo and Frank Samuelson on an 18-foot Jersey skiff (named Fox) on June 6, 1896. The voyage left from New York and arrived in England on July 31, 1896.

== Prohibition ==
The boat during prohibition was modified into a speedboat but there are still some builders making traditional boats in fiberglass.

With the start of Prohibition Captain William McCoy began to bring rum from Bimini and the Bahamas into south Florida through Government Cut. The Coast Guard soon caught up with him, so they began to bring the illegal goods to just outside the U.S. territorial waters and let smaller boats and other captains such as Habana Joe take the risk of bringing it into shore. By far the biggest Rum Row was in the New York/Philadelphia area off the New Jersey coast, where as many as 60 ships were seen at one time. One of the most notable New Jersey rum runners was Habana Joe, who could be seen at night running into remote areas in Raritan Bay with his flat-bottom skiff for running up on the beach, making his delivery, and speeding away.

== See also ==
- Go-fast boat
