= Supercavitating propeller =

Marine propeller designed to operate with a full cavitation bubble

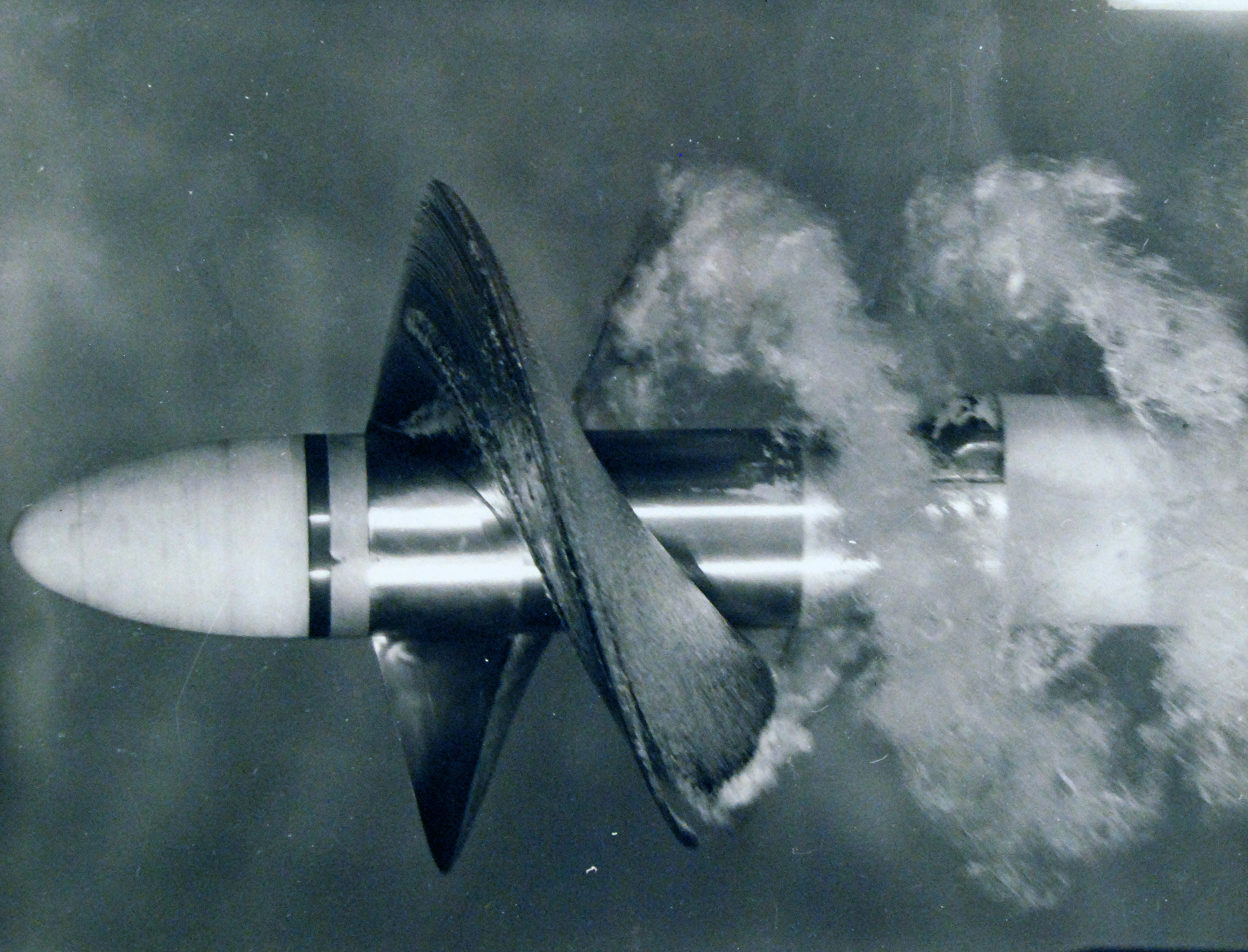

The supercavitating propeller is a variant of a propeller for propulsion in water, where supercavitation is actively employed to gain increased speed by reducing friction. They are being used for military purposes and for high performance racing boats as well as model racing boats.

This article distinguishes a supercavitating propeller from a subcavitating propeller running under supercavitating conditions. In general, subcavitating propellers become less efficient when they are running under supercavitating conditions.

The supercavitating propeller operates submerged with the entire diameter of the blade below the water line. Its blades are wedge-shaped to force cavitation at the leading edge and to avoid water skin friction along the whole forward face. As the cavity collapses well behind the blade, the supercavitating propeller avoids the spalling damage due to cavitation that is a problem with conventional propellers.

An alternative to the supercavitating propeller is the surface piercing, or ventilated propeller. These propellers are designed to intentionally leave the water and entrain atmospheric air to fill the void, which means that the resulting gas layer on the forward face of the propeller blade consists of air instead of water vapour. Less energy is thus used, and the surface-piercing propeller generally enjoys lower drag than the supercavitating principle. The surface-piercing propeller also has wedge-shaped blades, and propellers may be designed that can operate in both supercavitating and surface-piercing mode.

Supercavitating propellers were developed to usefulness for very fast military vessels by Vosper & Company.

The pioneer of this technology and other high speed offshore boating technologies was Albert Hickman (1877–1957), early in the 20th century. His Sea Sled designs used a surface piercing propeller.

== See also ==
- Axial fan design
- Boston Whaler
- Cathedral hull
- Supercavitating torpedo
