= Harpoon 6.2 =

Sailboat class

Development
- Designer: [[C&C Design (Robert W. Ball)]]
- Location: United States
- Year: 1979
- No. built: 150
- Builder: Boston Whaler
- Role: Racer

Boat
- Displacement: 1,700 lb (771 kg)
- Draft: 3.50 ft (1.07 m)

Hull
- Type: monohull
- Construction: fiberglass
- LOA: 20.33 ft (6.20 m)
- LWL: 15.83 ft (4.82 m)
- Beam: 8.00 ft (2.44 m)
- Engine: outboard motor

Hull appendages
- Keel: fin keel
- Ballast: 550 lb (249 kg)
- Rudder: transom-mounted rudder

Rig
- Rig type: Bermuda rig
- I foretriangle height: 19.25 ft (5.87 m)
- J foretriangle base: 7.67 ft (2.34 m)
- P mainsail luff: 22.50 ft (6.86 m)
- E mainsail foot: 10.25 ft (3.12 m)

Sails
- Sailplan: fractional rigged sloop
- Mainsail area: 115.31 sq ft (10.713 m^{2})
- Jib/genoa area: 73.82 sq ft (6.858 m^{2})
- Total sail area: 189.14 sq ft (17.572 m^{2})

Racing
- PHRF: 234

The Harpoon 6.2 is an American trailerable sailboat that was designed by C&C Design of Canada, as a racer and first built in 1979.

== Production ==
The design was built by Boston Whaler in the United States between 1979 and 1983, with 150 boats completed, but it is now out of production.

== Design ==
The Harpoon 6.2 is a recreational keelboat, built predominantly of fiberglass, with wood trim. The construction was fiberglass over a thick foam core for stiffness and which also renders the boat unsinkable. It has a fractional sloop rig, a raked stem, a plumb transom, a transom-hung rudder controlled by a tiller and a fixed fin keel. It displaces 1,700 lb (771 kg) and carries 550 lb (249 kg) of ballast.

The boat has a draft of 3.50 ft (1.07 m) with the standard fin keel and is normally fitted with a small 2 to 4 hp (1 to 3 kW) outboard motor for docking and maneuvering.

The design has sleeping accommodation for two people, with a double "V"-berth in the bow cabin. The galley is located on both sides just forward of the companionway ladder. The galley is equipped with a two-burner stove on the starboard side and a sink to port. An anchor locker is provided in the bow. Cabin headroom is 51 in (130 cm).

For sailing downwind the design may be equipped with a symmetrical spinnaker.

The design has a PHRF racing average handicap of 234 and a hull speed of 5.3 kn (9.8 km/h).

== Operational history ==
In a 2010 review Steve Henkel wrote, "for a few years in the early 1980s, Boston Whaler went into she sailboat business, producing a '5.2' (17 feet long) and '6.2' ... Best features: The Harpoon 6.2 comes close to the best racing sailers among her comp[etitor]s, the Antrim 20 and the Mystic Mini-Ton 21, but we don't think she makes the grade in terms of beauty or grace. Worst features: A short waterline and relatively shallower and lighter ballast keeps her racing performance from equalling the Antrim or the Mini-Ton. Space below is equal to the roomy Antrim, but is not laid out as well—and includes only two berths, not four as with all her comp[etitor]s. Prices for used boats may be higher than what may seem rational, based on the hypnotic drawing power of the Boston Whaler name."

== See also ==
- List of sailing boat types
