= Juliet Marine Systems Ghost =

Advanced super-cavitating stealth ship

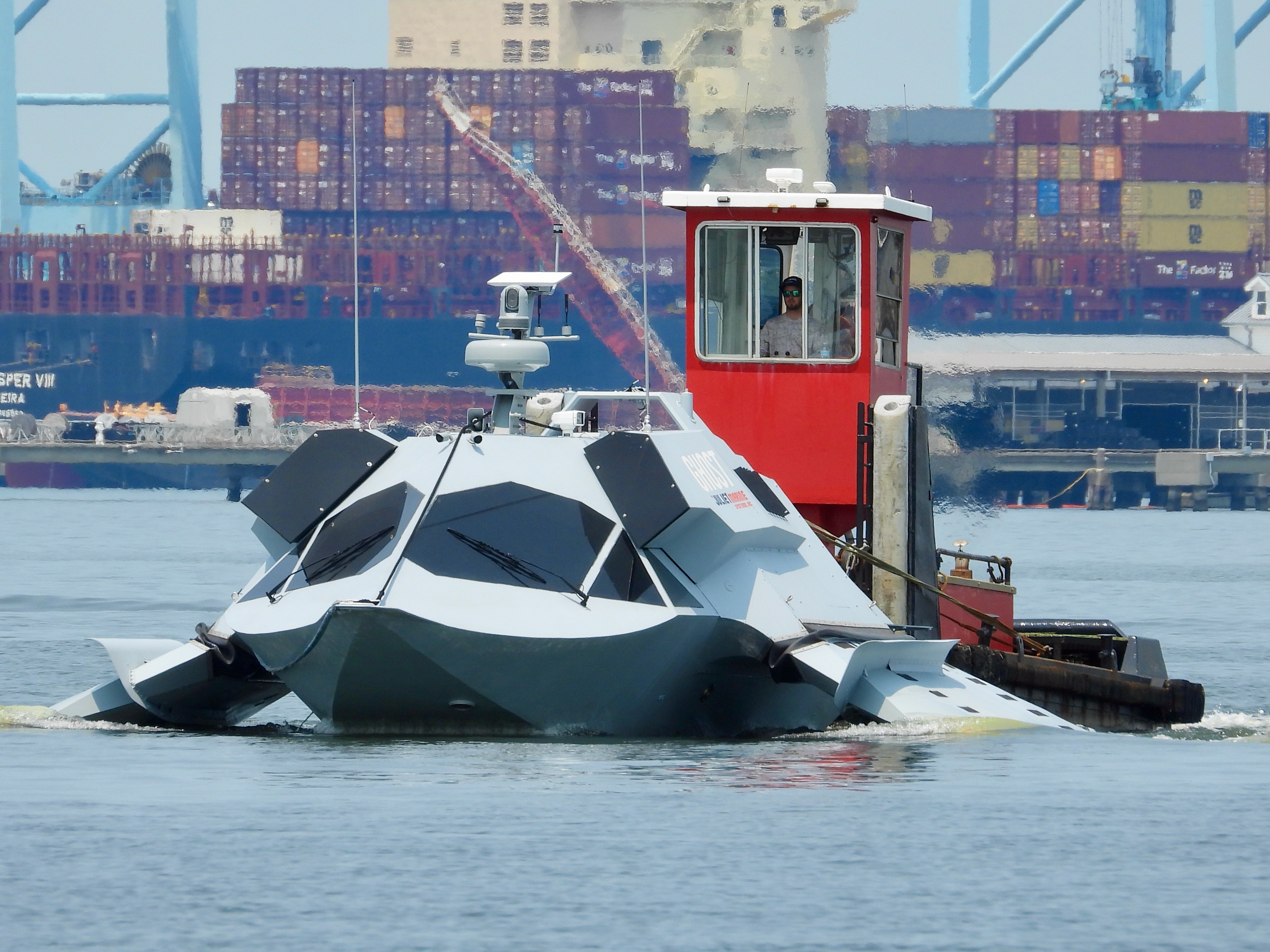
Ghost prototype being pushed by a tug in Norfolk harbor in 2025

Juliet Marine Systems Ghost is a super-cavitating stealth ship. The ship's experimental hull design can reduce hull friction to 1/900th that of conventional watercraft. Ghost was designed, developed, and built by the private American company Juliet Marine Systems.

== History ==
Inventor Gregory Sancoff had decided to focus on small watercraft following the attack on USS Cole in 2000, after which he recalled saying: "Some yahoo terrorists in a cheap little boat and $500 worth of explosives can kill 17 sailors on a billion-dollar ship?" He also came across a 630-page United States Navy report on an exercise called Juliet, where the Navy attacked an enemy force of small, high-speed boats; after two days, the Navy had suffered over 20,000 simulated casualties. Sancoff gathered information on marine technology, including hydroplane racing boats and high-speed super-cavitating torpedoes.

In 2007, Sancoff founded Juliet Marine Systems, named after the Navy exercise that inspired him, and began work on a plywood hull mock-up at Portsmouth, New Hampshire. In October 2009, Sancoff's patent attorney received a letter from the United States Patent and Trademark Office, with a recommendation from the Office of Naval Research (ONR), enforcing a secrecy order forbidding Juliet Marine from filing its patents internationally or speaking about its technology; the secrecy orders were lifted in 2011.

Prototype trial runs were conducted at night, with the main hull section failing to lift out of the water on the first dozen runs. it first successfully lifted in 2011, reaching roughly 4 ft (1.2 m) high. Trials revealed the vessel's smoothness, traversing 8–10 ft (2.4–3.0 m) high waves without the crew feeling much motion sickness, unlike those on board an accompanying chase boat.

In 2014, Sancoff declared he was "aware" of the Department of Defense's apprehension of working with startup companies. The Navy has a policy of only buying technologies of an announced interest and cannot procure a system without established requirements. In 2009, the Defense Advanced Projects Research Agency (DARPA) expressed interest in funding Ghost; Sancoff rejected this to retain the patent rights. The ONR reportedly produced feedback declaring a lack of trust in the design. He also voiced concerns over potential theft of the design as the patents are publicly available, and repeated attempts to breach the company's computer systems. U.S. allies have expressed interest in Ghost, and Sancoff has said he is willing to make a foreign sale. In September 2014, the United States Department of State permitted Foreign Military Sales discussions with South Korea about Ghost.

One impediment to U.S. Navy procurement of Ghost is a preference of senior leaders for large-hulled oceangoing vessels that can also perform inshore operations, instead of smaller craft specialized for inshore missions.

In 2024, General Dynamics partnered with Juliet Marine Systems to develop the Ghost as an optionally crewed unmanned surface vehicle.

== Design ==
Ghost uses a dual-pontoon super-cavitating hull, known as the small waterplane-area twin-hull (SWATH), to run at top speed through 10 ft (3.0 m) seas. It is gyro-stabilized; control is provided by 22 underwater control surfaces. Below eight knots, Ghost sits in the water on its centerline, 38 ft (12 m) - long module; faster than this, the marine aluminum buoyant hulls lifts the main hull out of the water by two 12 ft (3.7 m) - long struts, achieving full stability and reducing the amount of area resisting the water. Each strut is attached to a 62 ft (19 m) - long underwater tube that contains the engines. Four propellers are at the front of the tubes, which is more stable and allows for better control at high speeds; the propellers funnel air down through the struts, creating a gas bubble around each tube (the cavitation effect) for reduced drag and smooth motion. Propulsion on the prototype is provided by two T53-703 turboshaft engines providing 2,000 horsepower; there are plans to later adopt the General Electric T700 turboshaft engine. Since the tubes that contain the engines, fuel, and most computing systems are underwater, this lessens vulnerability because critical systems are protected by the water itself. The aircraft-style cockpit is outfitted with large windshields fashioned from two inch-thick glass; steering is provided via a throttle and joystick arrangement. Ghost has achieved speeds of over 30 knots, and is being tested to 50 knots.

It is called Ghost in recognition of its design, which bears a marked resemblance to the Lockheed F-117 Nighthawk, making the craft virtually invisible to radar detection. It can perform several types of missions, including anti-surface warfare (ASuW), anti-submarine warfare (ASW), and mine countermeasures (MCM): ASuW armament consists of the M197 20mm rotary cannon and launch tubes that expel exhaust downward between the struts of the SWATH hulls, concealing and dissipating the thermal signature of the launch for BGM-176B Griffin missiles and Advanced Precision Kill Weapon System rockets, with an electro-optical/infrared (EO/IR) sensor and radar. An ASW version could be equipped with an EO/IR sensor, radar, sonobuoy launch tubes, a dipping sonar, and four aft-firing torpedo tubes; an MCM version could be equipped with a towing boom to lower and raise two towed mine-hunting sonars, such as the Kline 5000 or Raytheon AN/AQS-20A.

The current Ghost costs $10 million per copy, is crewed by 3-5 sailors, has an endurance of 3 days, and can be partially disassembled to fit in a Boeing C-17 Globemaster III for transport if needed. There is room for 16 passengers with two 6 in (15 cm) - diameter round windows in the hull.
