= W. Albert Hickman =

Canadian inventor

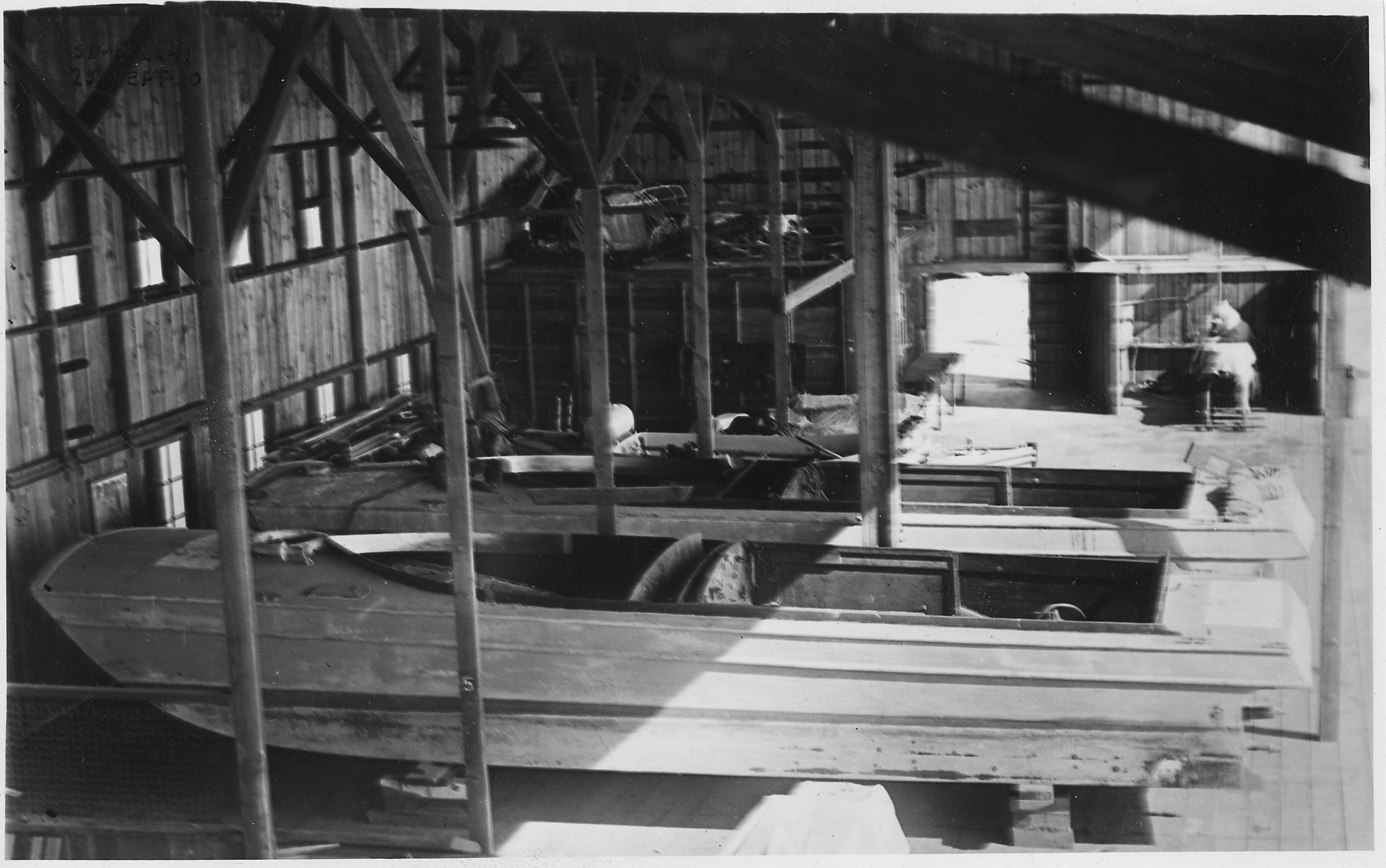
Hickman sea sled

William Albert Hickman (22 December 1878 in New Brunswick – 10 September 1957) was a Canadian designer and manufacturer of innovative fast boats. He is best known as the inventor of the Hickman Sea Sled.

== Biography ==
Born in Dorchester, New Brunswick, Hickman grew up in Pictou, Nova Scotia, as part of a wealthy shipbuilding family. He earned a degree in marine engineering from Harvard University in 1899. He was later a Commissioner of New Brunswick, a lecturer for the Government, a Fellow of the Royal Colonial Institute and a successful novelist.

He was highly intelligent but, openly, did not suffer fools gladly and was forever irritating his contemporaries in the marine business. This probably contributed to the low coverage of his ideas in the boating press.

A 1940s promotional brochure which was in other respects conventional sales material included this banner heading which revealed the man: "Truth is like unto a star, appearing somewhat small, but bright and secure".

== Hickman sea sled ==
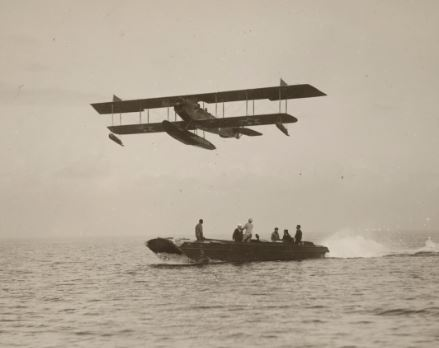
N9 and 32 foot Sea Sled NAS Pensacola, Jan 26, 1918. NARA collection.

He was the inventor of the inverted vee planing hull known as the Hickman sea sled.

A new type of vessel, which promises to revolutionize water craft and which takes the same place on the water that the automobile does on land - Scientific American 26 September 1914. In September 1914, a 54 foot Sea Sled design, with an internal steel frame designed by Hickman's Chief Engineer E. F. Tomlinson, four surface piecing propellers, a single 18" torpedo, 3 pound Hotchkiss gun, and was proposed to the US Navy as the first high speed motor torpedo boat, the forerunner of the famous World War 2 PT boat. This vessel was later built in 1918 as US Navy vessel C-378 but was cancelled following the end of World War 1 after completing initial high speed trials recording a top speed of 37 knots at 1400 HP and a sustained speed of 34.5 knots in a winter northeaster storm with 12 to 14 foot seas. Various version of these steel framed Sea Sleds were used by both the US Navy and Army as rescue boats starting in 1913 up through the Second World War.

Along with the Sea Sled, a direct forefather of the modern high speed catamaran, or tunnel hull, he is credited with producing the first surface propellers, working out that they produced lift and patenting ideas for lifting strakes, sponsons, anti-trip chines and prop-riding craft. These are all well known and widely used principles today.

== Selected works ==
Like the story-telling narrator of An Unofficial Love-Story, who admits at the beginning of his fiction, "I was but an onlooker on the far outside," Albert Hickman became a kind of literary bystander, observing literature from a distance and Canadian literature, in particular, from an American vantage point. But his fiction continues to stand, albeit in a small corner in need of more light.

- 1900 – Handbook of New Brunswick
- 1903 – The Canadian West and Northwest
- 1903 – The Sacrifice of the Shannon 2003 ISBN 978-0-88780-542-4
- 1909 – An Unofficial Love Story
- 1914 – Canadian Nights

== See also ==
- Supercavitation propeller
