= Go-fast boat =

Type of boat

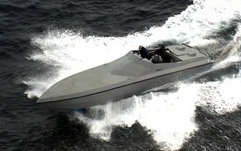
A "go-fast" is a preferred boat for smugglers

A go-fast boat is a small, fast powerboat designed with a long, narrow platform and a planing hull. Depending on definitions used, it is either a speedboat (synonymously) or a certain type of speedboat.

When the United States banned the sale of alcohol in the early twentieth century, these boats were used in "rum-running", transferring illegal liquor from larger vessels waiting outside US territorial waters to the mainland. Their high speed enabled them to avoid interception by law enforcement. The present conception of such boats is based largely on designs by Donald Aronow for offshore powerboat racing in the 1960s. During this period, these boats were also used by drug smugglers to transfer drugs across the Caribbean to the United States.

== Name ==
Go-fast boats are also called cigarette boats or cigar boats—references to their hull shape, to the items that they are (archetypally) used to smuggle (see Illicit cigarette trade and Cuban cigar), or both.

The term "cigarette boat" is especially popular because it is a brand name for a line of go-fast boats that popularized and largely defined the class in the 1960s, made by Don Aronow's Cigarette Racing Team. "Cigar boat" is often preferred because it avoids confusion with that brand.

Although modern go-fast boats postdate the fleet that was used for rum-running during the Great Depression, some of those boats were small and extremely fast, a theme that is shared with later smuggling (such as drug smuggling); thus, go-fast boats are sometimes informally (jocularly) called rum-runners.

== Construction ==
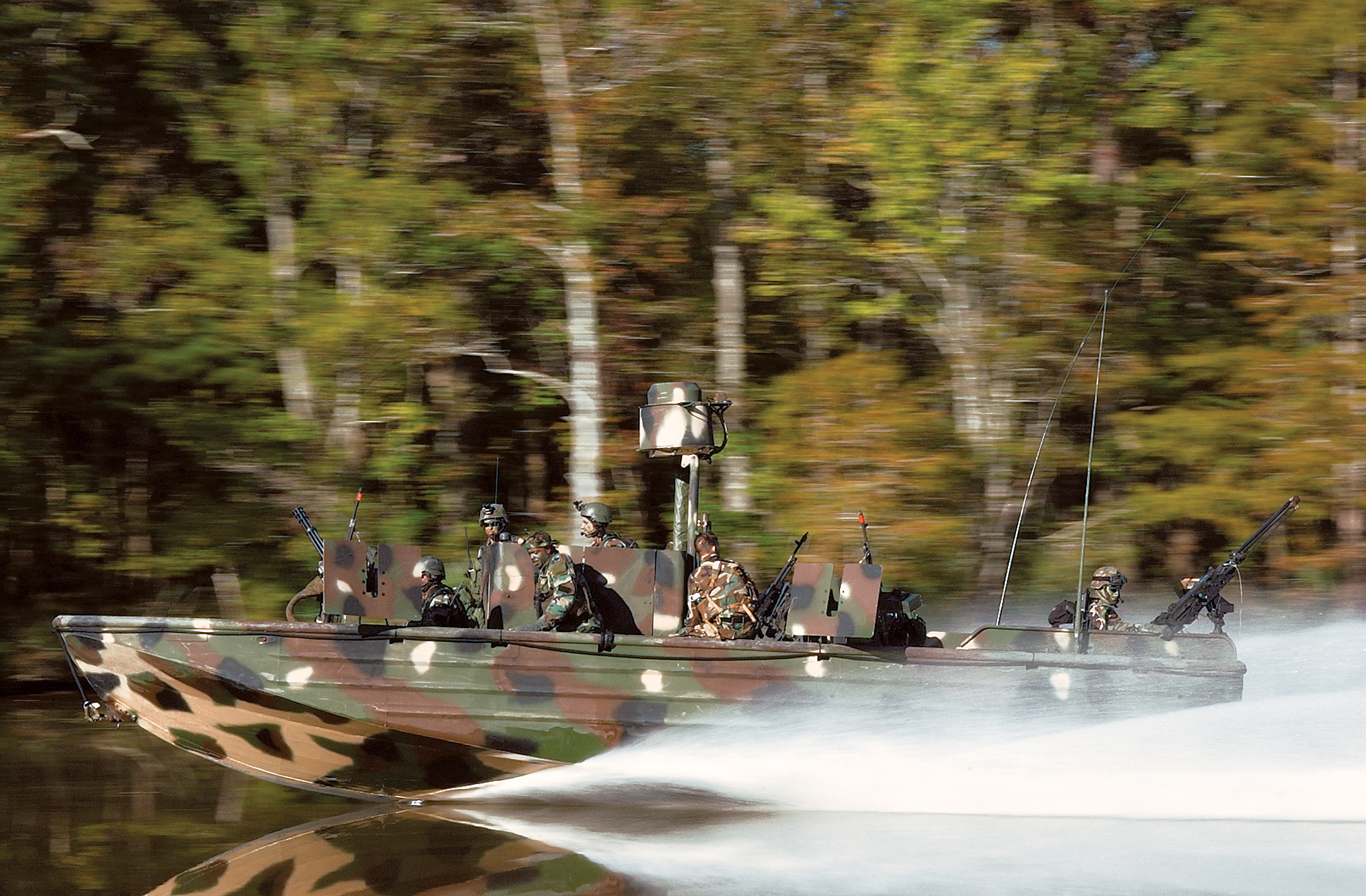
US Navy SWCCs train with a modified go-fast boat during a training exercise in Mississippi

A typical go-fast is laid-up using a combination of fibreglass, kevlar and carbon fibre, using a deep "V" style offshore racing hull ranging from 6.1 to 15.2 metres (20 to 50 ft) long, narrow in beam, and equipped with two or more powerful engines, often totalling more than 750 kilowatts (1,000 hp). The boats can typically travel at speeds over 80 knots (150 km/h; 92 mph) in calm waters, over 50 knots (93 km/h) in choppy waters, and maintain 25 knots (46 km/h; 29 mph) in the average 1.5-to-2.1-metre (5 to 7 ft) Caribbean seas. They are heavy enough to cut through higher waves, albeit slower in such conditions.

== Use ==
Reflecting their racing heritage, accommodations on these five-or-fewer-passenger boats are minimal. A small low cabin under the foredeck is typical, much smaller than a typical motor yacht of similar size. In addition to racing, most buyers buy these boats for their sleek design, power, performance, and mystique.

== Illegal use ==
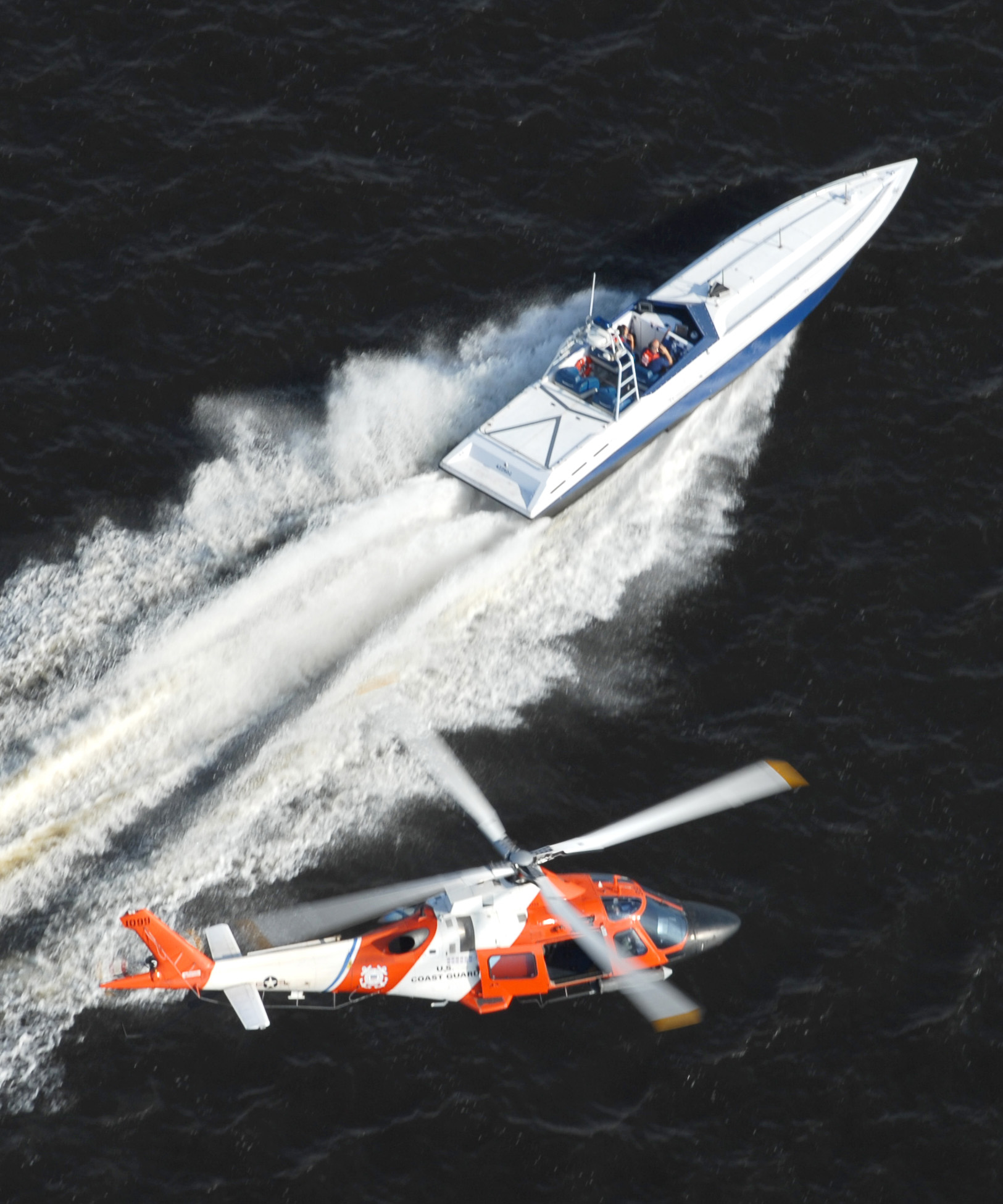
A helicopter from the US Coast Guard's Helicopter Interdiction Tactical Squadron pursues a go-fast boat during training

These boats are difficult to detect by radar except on flat calm seas or at close range. The United States Coast Guard and the DEA found them to be stealthy, fast, seaworthy, and very difficult to intercept using conventional craft. Due to this, coast guards have developed their own high-speed craft and use helicopters equipped with anti-materiel rifles used to disable engines of fleeing boats. The US Coast Guard go-fast boat is a rigid-hulled inflatable boat (RHIB) equipped with radar and powerful engines. The RHIB is armed with several types of non-lethal weapons and an M240 machine gun.

== Media portrayal ==
In the 2006 film Miami Vice, go-fast boats are used to smuggle drugs for cartels.

In the 1990s TV series Thunder in Paradise, starring Hulk Hogan, two mercenary heroes use a high-tech go-fast boat to fight criminals and villains.

== See also ==
- Jersey Skiff
- Narco-submarine
- Night Train seizure, one of the largest drug seizures in history.
- Supercavitating propeller
- Tunnel hull
