= Hickman sea sled =

Type of boat hull

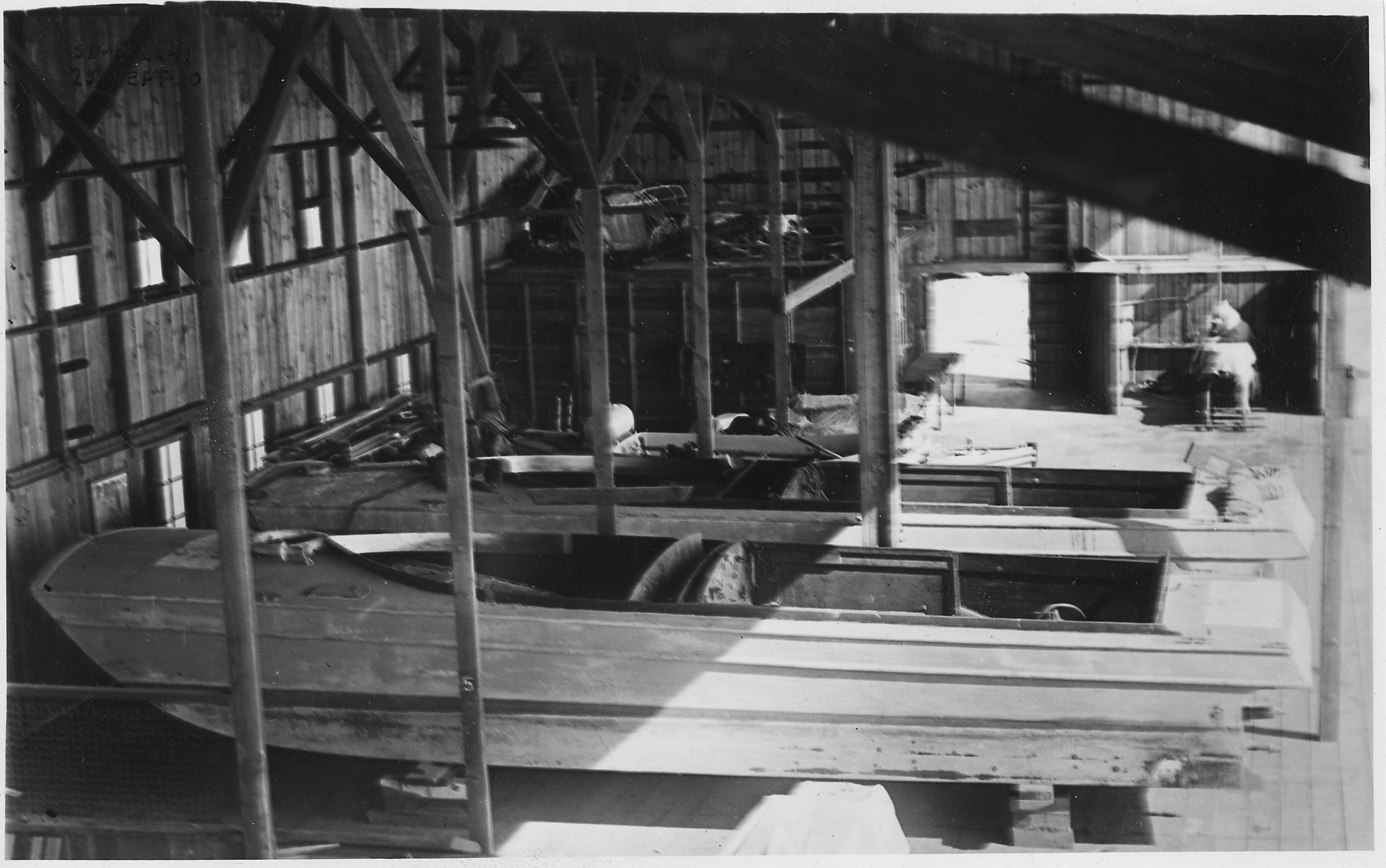
Hickman Sea Sled

The Hickman Sea Sled is an inverted vee planing hull invented by Albert Hickman. The Sea Sled is a direct forerunner of the modern high speed catamaran or tunnel hull. The reduced friction is due to a "trapped" gas film between the hull surface and water. A similar effect is seen in super-cavitating torpedoes where a gas generator creates a film separation to water friction.

"A new type of vessel, which promises to revolutionize water craft and which takes the same place on the water that the automobile does on land" - Scientific American 26 September 1914

== See also ==
- Cathedral hull
- Boston Whaler
- Supercavitation propeller
