= Edmond Pope =

Retired American spy

Edmond D. Pope
- Occupation(s): Businessman, retired naval captain
- Spouse: Cheri
- Website: Official website

Edmond D. Pope (Russian: Эдмонд Поуп) is a retired American intelligence officer-turned-businessman, convicted by a Russian court in 2000 on charges of spying for the U.S. Defense Intelligence Agency (DIA). He was sentenced to 20 years in prison for buying up and smuggling classified military equipment out of the country as scrap metal. (Note: Allegedly, FSB General General Nikolai Oleshko (Russian: Николая Олешко) headed the first department of the Investigative Directorate of the FSB, which handled the Edmond Pope case, with Yuri Plotnikov (Russian: Юрий Плотников) as an investigator and his father Oleg Plotnikov (Russian: Олег Плотников) as a prosecutor in court.) 253 days into his custody, Pope was pardoned by the newly elected Russian President Vladimir Putin as US government claimed that Pope had a rare form of bone cancer. Pope has always maintained his innocence and continues to assert that the Russian authorities used him as a scapegoat for their broken system.

In an interview with CNN, Pope spoke of a plot by unspecified people in the US, as well as the KGB and the Russian mafia, as a part of which Pope was being slowly poisoned in the Lefortovo Prison. Pope asserted that this was done with the hopes that he would eventually have to be transferred to a hospital, abducted on his way, and smuggled out of the country. Pope claims that Congressman John E. Peterson and Pope's wife "learned of this plot and put a stop to it before it was carried out," for which he was grateful.

== Book ==
A book recounting his experience was published in 2001.

== See also ==
- VA-111 Shkval
