= Hoot (torpedo) =

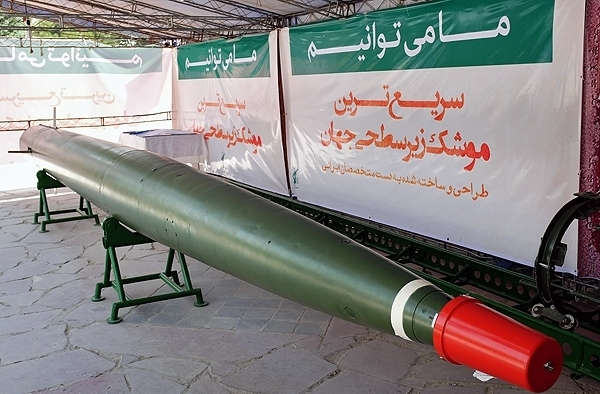
- Type: Supercavitation Torpedo

Service history
- In service: 2006–present
- Used by: Iran

Specifications
- Warhead: High explosive
- Engine: Solid-fuel rocket
- Operational range: 6 miles
- Maximum speed: 360 km/h (220 mph) 100 meters per second

The Hoot (Persian: حوت; Whale) is an Iranian supercavitation torpedo claimed to travel at approximately 360 km/h (220 mph), several times faster than a conventional torpedo. It was claimed to have been successfully test-fired from a surface ship against a dummy submarine during the Iranian military exercise "Great Prophet" (پيامبر اعظم) on 2 April 2006 and 3 April 2006. Iran test-fired the torpedo within its territorial waters in the Strait of Hormuz in May 2017.

The official Iranian news agency IRNA claims the torpedo was produced and developed by the Islamic Revolutionary Guard Corps (سپاه پاسداران انقلاب اسلامی). Most military and industry analysts have concluded that the Hoot is reverse engineered from the Russian VA-111 Shkval supercavitation torpedo which travels at the same speed.

== See also ==
- List of supercavitating torpedoes
