= Cathedral hull =

Boat hull shape

A cathedral hull, seen from below, with a simple platform for the rest of the boat.

A cathedral hull is a hull shape used in modern boats, usually power-driven. It has sponsons which extend almost as far forward as the main hull. The airspace between the hulls may be very small or nonexistent.

Depending on the proportions of the sponsons and the depth of the main hull, the cathedral hull can approach the handling characteristics of either the Hickman sea sled, or the vee hull. The naval architect first credited with the successful use of the deep-vee hull form, C. Raymond Hunt, was involved in the design of the original 13’ Boston Whaler. It is cathedral hulled forward, but nearly a flat-bottomed scow at the stern.

The term "cathedral hull" refers to the resemblance of a section through an inverted boat to that of a medieval cathedral.

== Characteristics ==
The cathedral hull configuration tends to result in a very broad bow; many such boats are completely rectangular. This provides the maximum cargo or working space for a given length and beam. The hull shape is also very stable compared to a conventional v-shaped bottom, and in either light chop conditions or above 40 knots (45 mph; 75 km/h) or so in certain conditions can be faster than a flat bottom, for the same weight, length and beam.

Cathedral hulls became popular in the 1960s and 1970s, when the use of fiberglass made economical production of this hull-form possible. The undesirable aspects of the cathedral hull are greater weight and cost, pounding in rough water, and a boxy appearance. Their advantages include high waterplane area at rest (good initial stability) a dry ride in light chop, and reasonable fuel economy at planing speeds. In exposed waters this hull form has been almost totally replaced by the modified-V and deep-V hull forms. After a period of reduced popularity, they live on in modified form as "deck boats" which are very popular in the inland lakes and rivers.

The cathedral hull design was originated by naval architect Richard C. Cole for Thunderbird boats in North Miami, Florida, in 1958.

== See also ==
- Tunnel hull
- Supercavitation propeller
- Hull
