= Night Train seizure =

1977 seizure of marijuana off the coast of Florida

The Night Train drug seizure was a December 1977 seizure of 54 tons of marijuana by the United States Coast Guard off the southeastern coast of Florida which marked the beginning of Operation Stopgap, a United States federal law enforcement inter-agency drug interdiction operation focusing on interdicting drugs from Colombian cartels and other illicit Central and South American drug sources. The Night Train seizure was the largest single drug seizure in history at the time it occurred, and it remains one of the largest marijuana seizures made in the territorial waters of the United States.

Operation Stopgap was one of the first inter-agency law enforcement efforts focused on the interdiction of illegal drugs from Central and South America, and it featured personnel of the Coast Guard, DEA and US Federal Marshals Service working together, as well as the resources of the Intelligence Section of the Drug Enforcement Administration and Coast Guard Intelligence (CGI).

The Night Train was a 189-foot coastal cargo vessel that had become legendary in the law enforcement community and smuggling circles due to its repeated ability to elude US law enforcement for nearly two years before being captured off the coast of West Palm Beach as the first seizure of Stopgap. Operation Stopgap was but the first of a number of highly successful inter-agency intelligence and interdiction operations that led to a large number of successful seizures and prosecutions in the late 1970s and early 1980s, garnering the U.S. Coast Guard considerable press coverage during this period as seizure records continued to be broken. Stopgap was also one of the earliest interdiction operations to effectively use satellite technology in the pursuit and interdiction of drug smugglers.

== See also ==
- Coast Guard Investigative Service
- Go-fast boat
- United States Coast Guard Legal Division
