= Metre per second =

SI derived unit of speed and velocity

metre per second
- Unit system: SI
- Unit of: speed
- Symbol: m/s

Conversions
| 1 m/s in ... | ... is equal to ... |
- km/h: 3.6
- mph: 2.2369
- kn: 1.9438
- ft/s: 3.2808

The metre per second (alternatively spelled meter per second) is the unit of both speed (a scalar quantity) and velocity (a vector quantity, which has direction and magnitude) in the International System of Units (SI), equal to the speed of a body covering a distance of one metre in a time of one second. As the base unit for speed in the SI, it is commonly used in physics, mechanics, and engineering contexts. It represents both scalar speed and vector velocity, depending on context. According to the definition of metre, 1 m/s is exactly 1/299792458 of the speed of light.

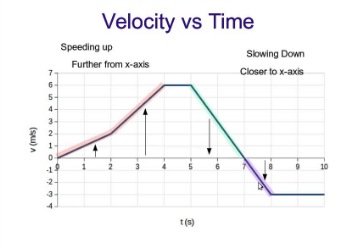
A velocity(In vector metres per second) versus time chart. It shows how the unit metre per second is often used in scientific and educational occasions.

The SI unit symbols are m/s, m·s^{−1}, m s^{−1}, or m/s.

== Conversions ==
1 m/s is equivalent to:

= 3.6 km/h (exactly)
≈ 3.2808 feet per second (approximately)
≈ 2.2369 miles per hour (approximately)
≈ 1.9438 knots (approximately)

1 foot per second = 0.3048 m/s (exactly)

1 mile per hour = 0.44704 m/s (exactly)

1 km/h = 0.27777.... m/s (exactly)

== History and Standardization ==
The metre per second became the official SI derived unit for both speed and velocity with the establishment of the International System of Units (SI) in 1960 by the General Conference on Weights and Measures (CGPM). Prior to this, various units such as feet per second, miles per hour, and knots were more commonly used, depending on the region and application.

The unit derives from the SI base units of metre (length) and second (time), both of which were defined more precisely in the 20th century. The metre was originally based on the dimensions of the Earth, but is now defined by the distance light travels in vacuum in 1/299792458 of a second. The second is defined using the vibration frequency of caesium atoms (9192631770 oscillations per second). Because of its accuracy, simplicity and preciseness, this unit is adopted as the official unit of speed and velocity and is almost always used as the unit of speed and velocity in scientific occasions.

== Relation to other measures ==
The benz, named in honour of Karl Benz, has been proposed as a name for one metre per second. Although it has seen some support as a practical unit, primarily from German sources, it was rejected as the SI unit of velocity and has not seen widespread use or acceptance.

The square of metres per second, or square metre per square second, is used as a unit of gravitational potential.

== Unicode character ==
The "metre per second" symbol is encoded by Unicode at code point U+33A7 ㎧ SQUARE M OVER S.

== See also ==
- Orders of magnitude (speed)
- Metre per second squared
- Metre
