= Boston Whaler =

American boat manufacturer

- Founded: June 5, 1958
- Founder: Dick Fisher
- Headquarters: Edgewater, Florida, United States
- Products: Fiberglass boats
- Parent: Brunswick Boat Group

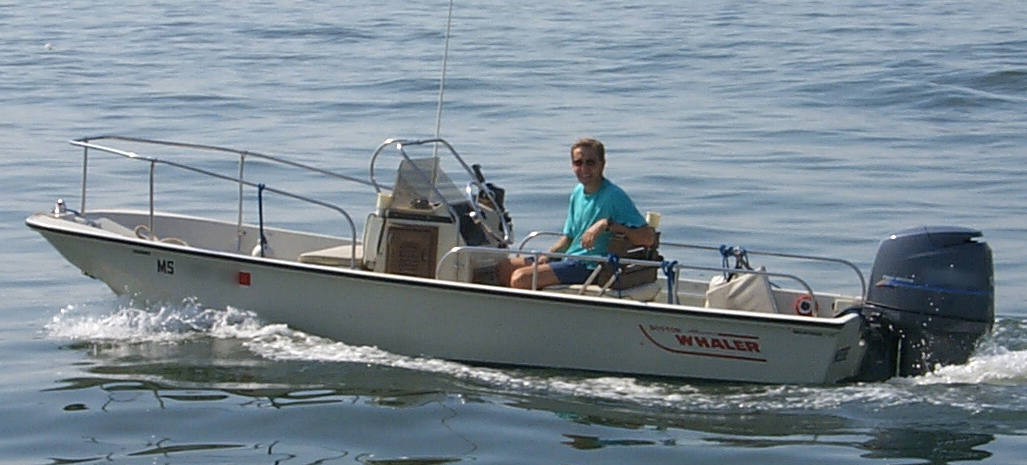
17-foot (5.2 m) Boston Whaler Montauk in 2002

Boston Whaler is an American boat manufacturer. It is a subsidiary of the Brunswick Boat Group, a division of the Brunswick Corporation. Boston Whalers were originally produced in Massachusetts, hence the name, but today are manufactured in Edgewater, Florida.

== History ==
Richard "Dick" Fisher graduated from Harvard University in 1936. He ran a company building small, lightweight boats out of balsa wood. He designed a rowboat and got the materials to build it, but he never completed it.

In the 1950s, polyurethane foam, a stiff, lightweight, buoyant material, was invented. Fisher imagined it as a replacement for the lightweight balsa used in small boat construction, and in 1954 he constructed a small sailing dinghy filled with the foam, with a design similar to the Sunfish. He showed the finished product to his friend, naval architect C. Raymond Hunt. Hunt recognized potential in the process, however he did not feel the design was particularly suited to sailboats. Instead, he created a design based on the Hickman Sea Sled featuring a cathedral hull.

Fisher built a prototype out of Styrofoam and Epoxy. "It had two keels," said Fisher, "one inverted V between the runners and an anti-skid, anti-trip chine." Fisher tested the boat all that summer and thought it was "the greatest thing ever". That fall, Fisher started running the boat in rough weather, and found that the hull displayed issues with handling and cavitation. Under heavy load, and off-plane, the cavity in the middle of the hull forced air into the water, and then back into the prop. Fisher approached Hickman, the original designer of the wooden Sea Sled for a solution. However, Hickman thought his design needed no modifications. Fisher contemplated putting "some stuff on the bottom to move that airy water out of there." He used a method of trial and error, laying fiberglass on the bottom of the hull in the morning and running the boat behind his house when the glass cured. If the design did not work, he would bring it back to his house and start over.

This prototype boat began to have a slight V bottom and the two runners on the sides. Fisher then approached Hunt to examine the design changes. Hunt added his own design changes to the prototype; most notably, a third runner in the center of the hull. Fisher then built a prototype based on this new design to serve as a plug for the production mold.

Fisher and Hunt then took the boat on sea trials. One of these tests was to run the 13-foot (4.0 m) boat from Cohasset, Massachusetts to New Bedford and back, which is roughly 120 miles (190 km). During these sea trials, Fisher found another small flaw in the boats design: it was "wetter than hell." "A lot wetter," he said, "than the other boat had been." The reason for this, according to him, was the 9-inch-wide (23 cm) sole throwing spray into the boat. Since the mold was already made, it was modified by adding to the flat center between the three chines, turning it into a V-shape. In 1956, this design became the original Boston Whaler 13.

In 1958, boats made by the Fisher-Pierce manufacturing company were first marketed and sold under the brand name Boston Whaler. The boat was very stable and had great carrying capacity. These two features, along with great performance and rough weather handling made it very desirable. Also since the Whaler was so light in weight compared to the other boats at the time, it could be propelled by lower horsepower engines. Thru the late 1980s, the classic 13 ft 4 in (4.06 m) Whaler, and the 16 ft 7 in (5.05 m) Montauk were the most popular models in terms of sales. Gradually though the company moved away from these designs to a more conventional deep-vee hull, and after 1996 no more of the classic tri-hull boats were manufactured.

In 1969 the Boston Whaler boat operation of Fisher-Pierce was sold to the CML Group, whose portfolio would eventually include brands such as NordicTrack and The Nature Company. In 1989, amidst financial problems, the CML Group sold Boston Whaler to the Reebok Corporation, where, despite several advertising campaigns and new hull designs, it did relatively poorly, and was sold to Meridian Sports in 1994. Two years later in 1996 Brunswick Corporation purchased Boston Whaler for $27.4 million in cash and debt.

== Users ==
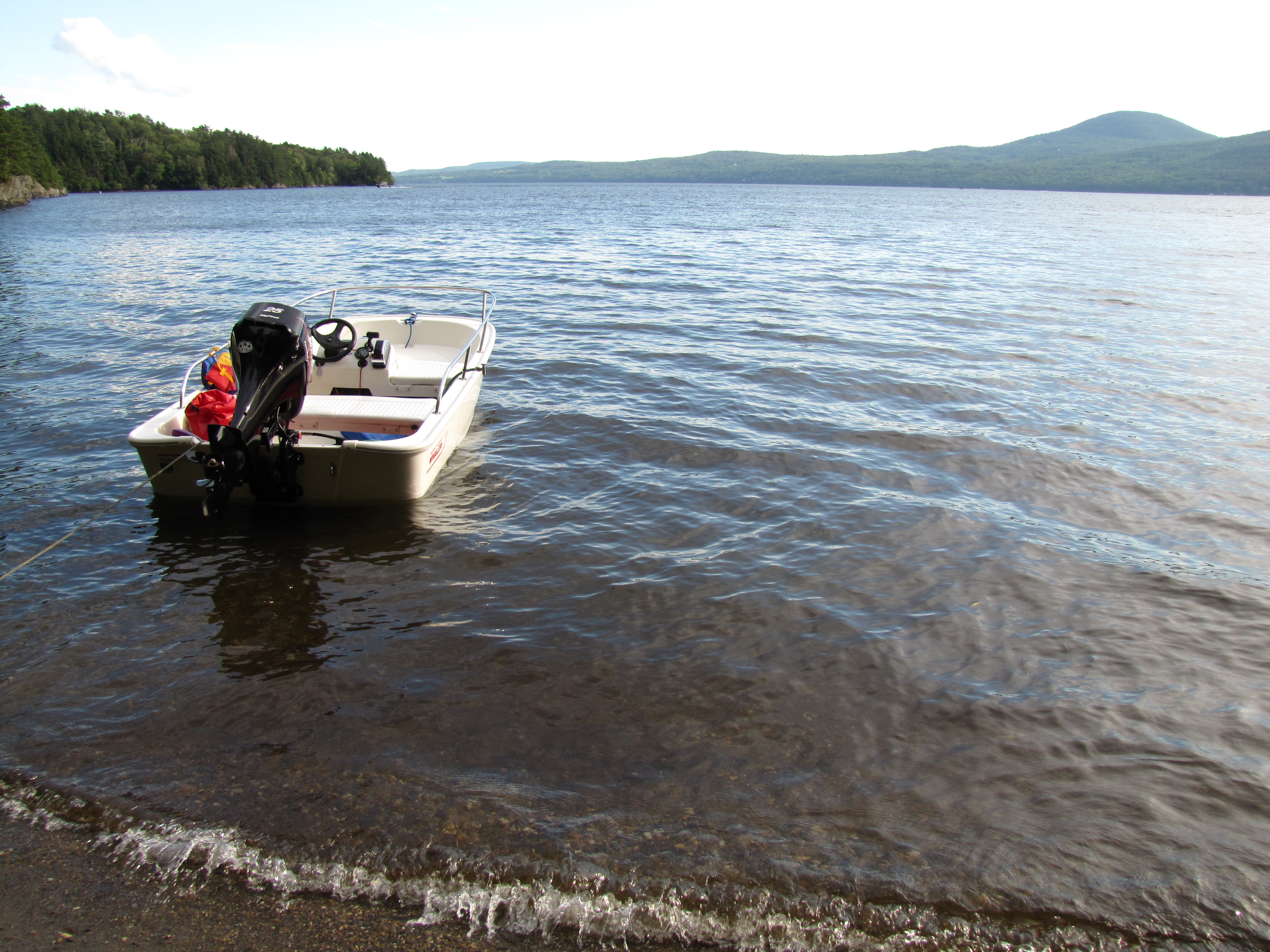
The 110 Sport

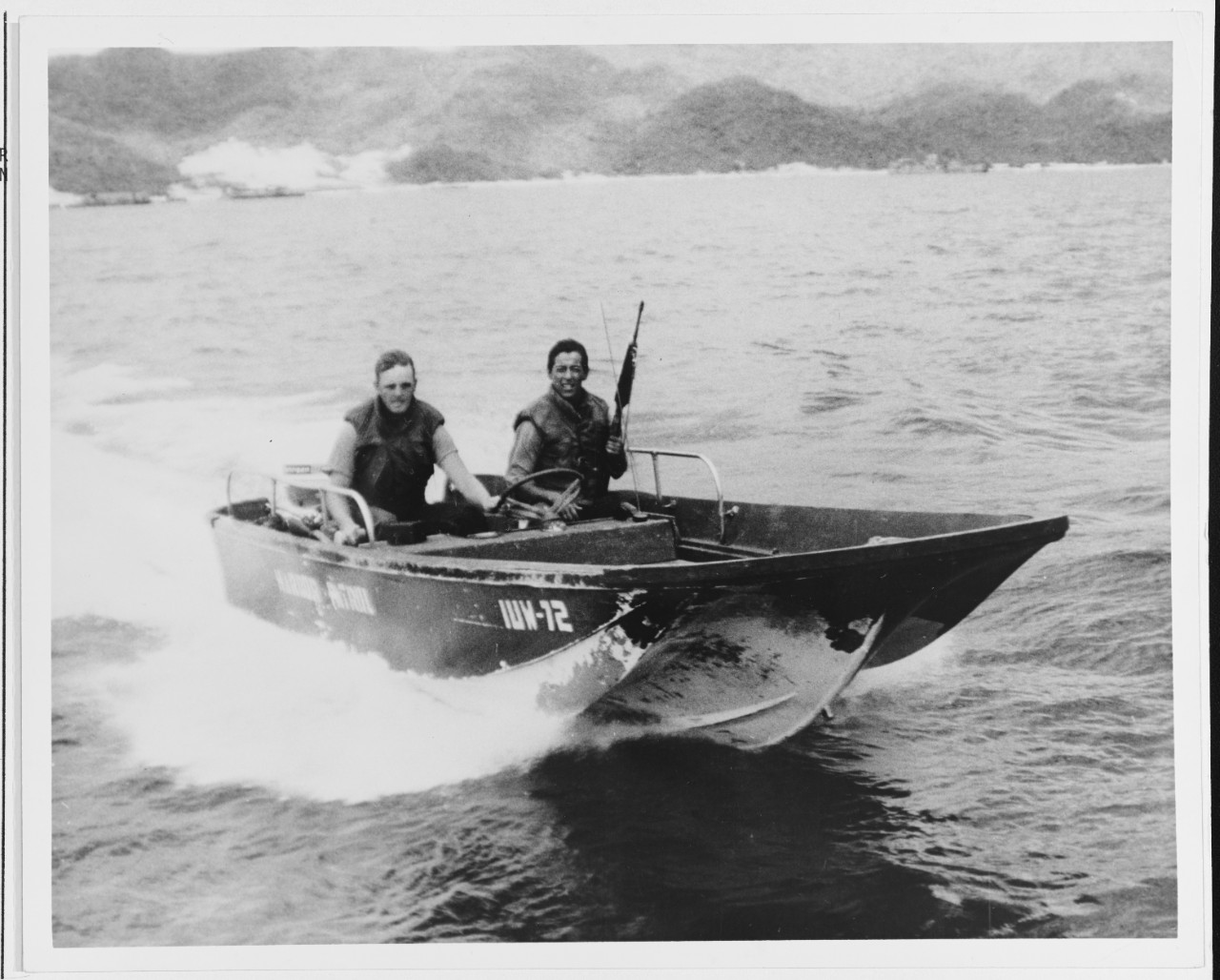
Boston Whaler on harbor defense in Danang Harbor, South Vietnam, August 1966

Although Boston Whalers are primarily seen as recreational boats, Brunswick Boats maintains a commercial division that sells Boston Whalers to coast guard and naval units worldwide. Boston Whalers were used in the Vietnam War by both the Navy SEALs and the United States Coast Guard in rescue and river patrol missions.

== Current models ==
Current production models range in length from 11.3 to 42.5 feet (3.4 to 13.0 meters). Brunswick also owns Mercury Marine; as a result, new Boston Whalers, like all other Brunswick boats, ship from the factory already equipped with Mercury engines. Models include:

Current Recreational Models
Name	Length	Layout	Min HP	Max HP
Tender	11.3 feet (3.4 m)	Skiff	5	15
Sport	<11.3 feet (3.4 m)	Skiff	5	25
Super Sport	13 feet (4.0 m)	Skiff	25	40
Super Sport	16 feet (4.9 m)	Skiff	75	90
Montauk	15.4 feet (4.7 m)	Center Console	40	60
Montauk	17.3 feet (5.3 m)	Center Console	90	115
Montauk	19.3 feet (5.9 m)	Center Console	115	150
Montauk	21.3 feet (6.5 m)	Center Console	150	200
Dauntless	17 feet (5.2 m)	Center Console	90	115
Dauntless	18 feet (5.5 m)	Center Console	135	150
Dauntless	21 feet (6.4 m)	Center Console	150	200
Dauntless	24.6 feet (7.5 m)	Center Console	250	350
Dauntless	27.8 feet (8.5 m)	Center Console	350	600
Outrage	18.8 feet (5.7 m)	Center Console	115	200
Outrage	23 feet (7.0 m)	Center Console	250	350
Outrage	25.4 feet (7.7 m)	Center Console	350	450
Outrage	28 feet (8.5 m)	Center Console	500	800
Outrage	33 feet (10 m)	Center Console	500	800
Outrage	35.7 feet (10.9 m)	Center Console	750	1,200
Outrage	38 feet (12 m)	Cuddy Cabin	900	1,600
Outrage	42.5 feet (13.0 m)	Cuddy Cabin	1,200	1,675
Vantage	23 feet (7.0 m)	Center Console	250	350
Vantage	28 feet (8.5 m)	Center Console	400	600
Vantage	33.5 feet (10.2 m)	Cuddy Cabin	500	800
Conquest	27.8 feet (8.5 m)	Cuddy Cabin	450	500
Conquest	32.2 feet (9.8 m)	Cuddy Cabin	600	800
Conquest	36 feet (11 m)	Cuddy Cabin	750	1,200
Conquest	41.3 feet (12.6 m)	Cuddy Cabin	1,200	1,600
Realm	35.5 feet (10.8 m)	Cuddy Cabin	750	1,200
Realm	38 feet (12 m)	Cuddy Cabin	1,200	1,600

Commercial Models
Name	Based On	Length	Layout	Min HP	Max HP	Status
Guardian	Montauk	15 feet (4.6 m)	Center Console	40	60	defunct
Guardian	Montauk	17 feet (5.2 m)	Center Console	80	100	defunct
Guardian	Outrage	18 feet (5.5 m)	Center Console	90	200	defunct
Guardian	Outrage	19 feet (5.8 m)	Center Console	115	200	defunct
Guardian	Outrage	21.3 feet (6.5 m)	Center Console	85	240	current
Guardian	Outrage	25.6 feet (7.8 m)	Center Console	115	300	current
Guardian	Outrage	27 feet (8.2 m)	Center Console	300	600	defunct
Justice	Conquest	20 feet (6.1 m)	Center Console	135	250	defunct
Justice	Conquest	25.41 feet (7.74 m)	Center Console	200	400	current
Justice	Conquest	28.41 feet (8.66 m)	Center Console	400	500	current
Justice	Conquest	32 feet (9.8 m)	Center Console	400	600	defunct
Justice	Conquest	37 feet (11 m)	Center Console	750	900	defunct
Challenger	Conquest	27 feet (8.2 m)	Cuddy Cabin	300	600	defunct
Challenger	Conquest	35 feet (11 m)	Cuddy Cabin	300	600	defunct
Vigilant	Conquest	27 feet (8.2 m)	Cuddy Cabin	400	450	defunct
Protector Impact		25 feet (7.6 m)	Center Console		450	current
Protector Impact		30.3 feet (9.2 m)	Center Console		900	current

== Advertising and unsinkability claim ==
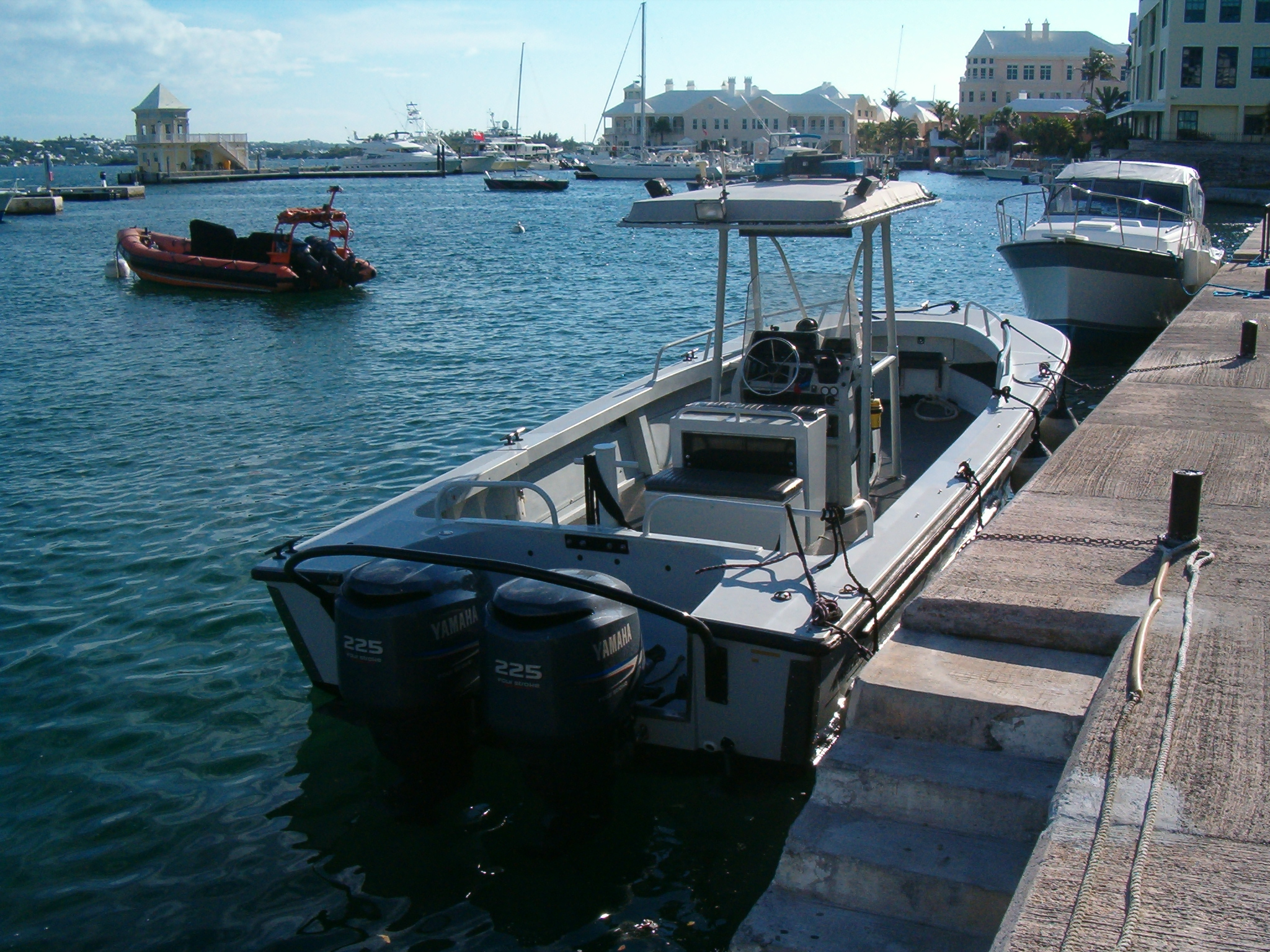
A Boston Whaler of the Bermuda Police Service

Boston Whaler has, for many years, sawn boats in half to illustrate their durability, performance, smooth ride and "unsinkability". The original 1961 Life magazine ad pictured Dick Fisher sitting in a floating 13-foot (4.0 m) Whaler with a crosscut saw halfway through the hull. After the cut was completed, Fisher used the stern section to tow the bow section back to shore. Modern Whaler advertising uses a chain saw. Due to the foam core construction, the Whaler will remain afloat when sawed completely in half. Boston Whaler boats also remain afloat when completely swamped (full of water). Because of these attributes, Boston Whaler's trademarked sales line is "the unsinkable legend."

Today, this "unsinkable" attribute is not exclusive to Boston Whalers. All motorboats (and certain other boat types) under 20 feet (6.1 m), manufactured for sale in the United States are required by law to have positive flotation, such that a completely swamped boat will still float. This is accomplished through the use of closed cell foam, or other non-permeable material. Boston Whaler, however, does claim to exceed the Coast Guard requirements.

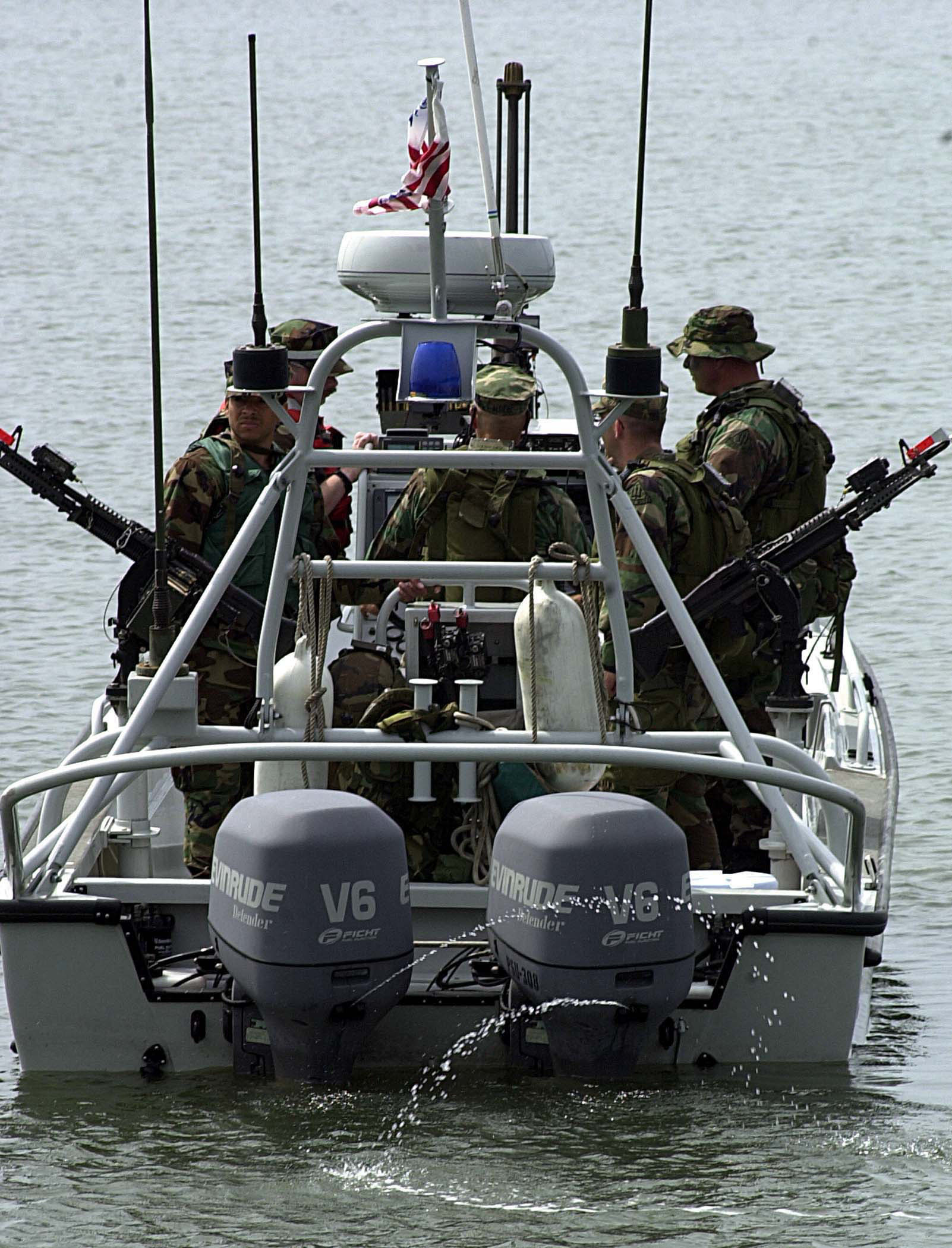
A 25-foot (7.6 m) Boston Whaler and its U.S. Coast Guard crew takes off from the coast of Mile Hammock Bay near Camp Lejeune, North Carolina

== See also ==
Designs

- Harpoon 6.2

Other

- Tunnel hull
