= Supercavitation =

Use of a cavitation bubble to reduce skin friction drag on a submerged object

An object (black) encounters a liquid (blue) at high speed. The fluid pressure behind the object is lowered below the vapour pressure of the liquid, forming a bubble of vapour (a cavity) that encompasses the object and reduces drag.

In hydrodynamic engineering, supercavitation is the artificial generation of a cavitation bubble to reduce skin friction drag on a submerged object and enable high-speed travel. Applications include torpedoes and propellers, but in theory, the technique could be extended to an entire underwater vessel.

== Physical principle ==
Cavitation is the internal boiling of a liquid caused by rapid flow around an object. Fluid flow around sharp corners requires very large pressure gradients, and in particular very low pressures "past the corner". In those areas, the pressure can drop below the vapor pressure, at which point the liquid boils.

Cavitation potential is measured by the nondimensional cavitation number, which is equal to the difference between local pressure and vapor pressure, divided by dynamic pressure. At increasing depths (or pipe pressures), the potential for cavitation is lower because the local pressure is much further from the vapor pressure.

Cavitation is typically considered a nuisance in hydrodynamic engineering, as cavitation bubbles released from the surface subsequently implode. The implosion generates small concentrated impulses that may damage surfaces like ship propellers and pump impellers.

A supercavitating object is a high-speed submerged object that is designed to initiate and maintain a cavitation bubble at its nose. The bubble extends (either naturally or augmented with internally generated gas) past the aft end of the object and prevents contact between the sides of the object and the liquid. This separation substantially reduces the skin friction drag on the supercavitating object.

A key feature of the supercavitating object is the nose, which typically has a sharp edge around its perimeter to form the cavitation bubble. The nose may be articulated and shaped as a flat disk or cone. The shape of the supercavitating object is generally slender so the cavitation bubble encompasses the object. If the bubble is not long enough to encompass the object, especially at slower speeds, the bubble can be enlarged and extended by injecting high-pressure gas near the object's nose.

The very high speed required for supercavitation can be temporarily reached by underwater-fired projectiles and projectiles entering water. For sustained supercavitation, rocket propulsion is used, and the high-pressure rocket gas can be routed to the nose to enhance the cavitation bubble.

The key engineering difficulty in supercavitation design is stability: because a supercavitating vehicle fully encased in bubble is no longer submerged, it experiences no buoyant force. One alternative only partially contains the vehicle in the bubble, supported by a submerged rear, but such situations trade off between support and increased drag.

In principle, supercavitating objects can be maneuvered using various methods, including the following:

- Drag fins that project through the bubble into the surrounding liquid
- A tilted object nose
- Gas injected asymmetrically near the nose to distort the cavity's geometry
- Vectoring rocket thrust through gimbaling for a single nozzle
- Differential thrust from multiple nozzles

== Applications ==
The main applications of supercavitation are supercavitating propellers and the supercavitating torpedo.

Supercavitating propellers are fitted on military boats, high-performance racing boats, and model racing boats. They are shaped to force cavitation on the entire forward face at high speed. The cavity collapses far behind the blade, avoiding the spallation observed when conventional propellers accidentally cavitate.

Supercavitating torpedoes have seen use in at least the Soviet (and Russian), US, German, and Iranian navies. On the small scale, supercavitating ammunition is used with German and Russian underwater firearms, and other similar weapons.

The Soviet Navy developed the first large-scale supercavitating torpedo, the VA-111 "Shkval". The Shkval uses rocket propulsion to achieve a maximum velocity of 386 kilometres per hour (240 mph; 208 kn), exceeding the speed of conventional torpedoes by at least a factor of five. It began development in 1960 under the code name "Шквал" (Squall). The VA-111 Shkval has been in service (exclusively in the Soviet, then Russian Navy) since 1977 with mass production starting in 1978. Several models were developed, with the most successful, the M-5, completed by 1972. From 1972 to 1977, over 300 test launches were conducted (95% of them on Issyk Kul lake).

In 1994, the United States Navy began development of the Rapid Airborne Mine Clearance System (RAMICS), a sea mine clearance system invented by C Tech Defense Corporation. C Tech proposed a supercavitating projectile stable in both air and water. In 2000 at Aberdeen Proving Ground, RAMICS projectiles fired from a hovering Sea Cobra gunship successfully destroyed a range of live underwater mines. In March 2009, Northrop Grumman completed the initial phase of RAMICS testing for introduction into the fleet.

The USA also released information about supercavitating antiship torpedoes in 2004, prompting several navies to fast-follow. In 2006, German weapons manufacturer Diehl BGT Defence announced their own supercavitating torpedo, the Barracuda, now officially named Superkavitierender Unterwasserlaufkörper (English: supercavitating underwater projectile). According to Diehl, it reaches speeds greater than 400 kilometres per hour (250 mph; 220 kn). The same year, Iran claimed to have successfully tested its first supercavitation torpedo, the Hoot (Whale), on 2–3 April 2006. Some sources have speculated it is based on the Russian VA-111 Shkval supercavitation torpedo, which travels at the same speed. Russian Foreign Minister Sergey Lavrov denied supplying Iran with the technology.

In 2004, the US DARPA also announced the Underwater Express program, a research and evaluation program to demonstrate the use of supercavitation for a high-speed underwater craft application. The US Navy's ultimate goal is a new class of underwater craft for littoral missions that can transport small groups of navy personnel or specialized military cargo at speeds up to 100 knots. DARPA awarded contracts to Northrop Grumman and General Dynamics Electric Boat in late 2006, although Electric Boat struggled to build even a scale model. By 2014, Juliet Marine Systems had a prototype ship named the Ghost, a supercavitating catamaran, prompting the Chinese Navy to attempt to build their own. Two years later, R&D continued in the US.

In 2025, the South Korean ADD began trials of their own supercavitating underwater vehicle.

== Alleged incidents ==
The Kursk submarine disaster was initially thought to have been caused by a faulty Shkval supercavitating torpedo, though later evidence points to a faulty 65-76 torpedo.

It is suspected that the sinking of the Russian cargo ship MV Ursa Major 16 nautical miles (30 km) off the coast of Spain 23 December 2024 was due to a supercavitating torpedo; a 50 centimetres (20 in) hole was punched in the hull. The ship was carrying nuclear reactor components to North Korea, and the party responsible is not known.

== See also ==
- APS amphibious rifle
- SPP-1 underwater pistol
- Supercavitating propeller
