= Tunnel hull =

A tunnel hull is a type of boat hull that uses two typically planing hulls with a solid centre that traps air. This entrapment then creates aerodynamic lift in addition to the planing (hydrodynamic) lift from the hulls. Many times this is attributed to ground effect. Theoretical research and full-scale testing of tunnel hulls has demonstrated the dramatic contributions of 'close-proximity ground effect' on enhanced aerodynamic lift/drag in operation of performance tunnel hull designs.

Tunnel hulls are distinguishable from other catamarans by the typical close hull spacing and solid deck in between the hulls.

Formula 1 powerboats have a tunnel hull catamaran design allowing them to go faster. Tunnel hulls are a common design in offshore powerboat racing.

== See also ==
- Cathedral hull
- Hickman sea sled
- Boston Whaler
- Supercavitation propeller
- Offshore Powerboat Racing
