= Thiovulum majus =

Scientific classification
- Domain: Bacteria
- Kingdom: Pseudomonadati
- Phylum: Campylobacterota
- Class: "Campylobacteria"
- Order: Campylobacterales
- Family: Helicobacteraceae
- Genus: Thiovulum
- Species: T. majus

Binomial name
- Thiovulum majus Hinze 1913 (Approved Lists 1980)

Species of bacterium

Thiovulum majus is a species of bacteria and a member of the phylum Campylobacterota. This sulfide-oxidizing species has been observed to swim at speeds as high as 615 micrometers per second, faster than those recorded for any other bacterial species.
