= Sea Bright Skiff =

Skiff design

The Sea Bright Skiff is a box-skegged skiff developed on the northern shore of New Jersey. It was used for fishing, by being launched through the surf, sailed to the fishing grounds, and returned through the surf.

== Description ==
The boat is quite different from the Jersey Skiff, being more round-sided, with less freeboard, and the distinct "box skeg" that proved particularly useful when engines were adopted. The boat has a nearly straight stem, rounded sides, a narrow flat bottom that becomes the bottom of the skeg, and a heart shaped transom. The boat was usually rigged with a spritsail mainsail and small jib with an unstayed mast. The early fishing versions used an oar as the rudder, more modern versions, however, have a regular rudder & tiller.

The larger pound boat, built to the same lines, was generally around 30 feet, but could run to 50 feet in length, 10 foot beam. It was used to carry to shore fish caught in offshore weirs. Like sardine carriers and oyster buy-boats, it was heavily laden on return, with very little freeboard.

This boat has nearly disappeared from the shores of New Jersey except as used by lifeguards (rowing configuration only).

A short video on the skiff can be found here.
