= VA-111 Shkval =

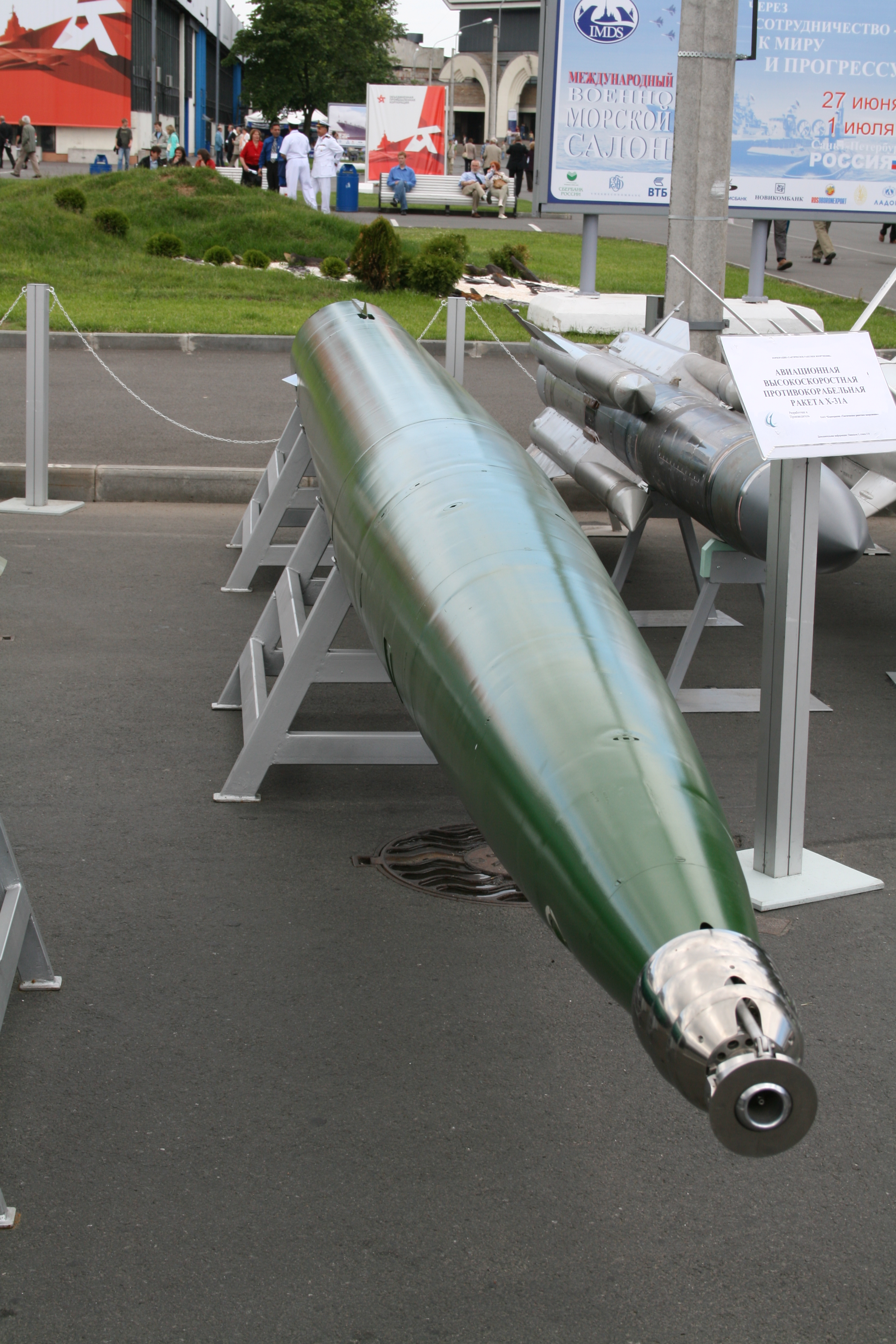
- VA-111 Shkval
- Type: Supercavitating torpedo
- Place of origin: Soviet Union

Service history
- In service: 1977–present
- Used by: Russian Navy and Iranian Navy

Production history
- Designer: NII-24 research institute
- Designed: 1960s–70s
- Manufacturer: Tactical Missiles Corporation
- Produced: 1977–present
- Variants: Shkval 2, Shkval-E

Specifications
- Mass: 2,700 kg (6,000 lb)
- Length: 8,200 mm (26 ft 11 in)
- Diameter: 533 mm (21 in)
- Effective firing range: Shkval: 7 km (4.3 mi); Shkval 2: From 11–15 km (6.8–9.3 mi)
- Warhead: Conventional explosive or nuclear
- Warhead weight: 210 kg (460 lb)
- Engine: Solid-fuel rocket
- Propellant: Solid-fuel
- Maximum speed: Launch speed: 50 knots (93 km/h; 58 mph); Maximum speed: in excess of 200 knots (370 km/h; 230 mph)
- Guidance system: GOLIS autonomous inertial guidance
- Launch platform: 533 mm (21 in) torpedo tubes

The VA-111 Shkval (from Russian: шквал, squall) torpedo and its descendants are supercavitating torpedoes originally developed by the Soviet Union. They are capable of speeds in excess of 200 knots (370 km/h or 230 miles/h).

== Design and capabilities ==
Design began in the 1960s when the NII-24 research institute was ordered to produce a new weapon capable of engaging nuclear submarines. The merger of the institute and GSKB-47 created the Research Institute of Applied Hydromechanics, who continued with the design and production of the Shkval.

Previously operational as early as 1977, the torpedo was announced as being deployed in the 1990s. The Shkval is intended as a countermeasure against torpedoes launched by undetected enemy submarines.

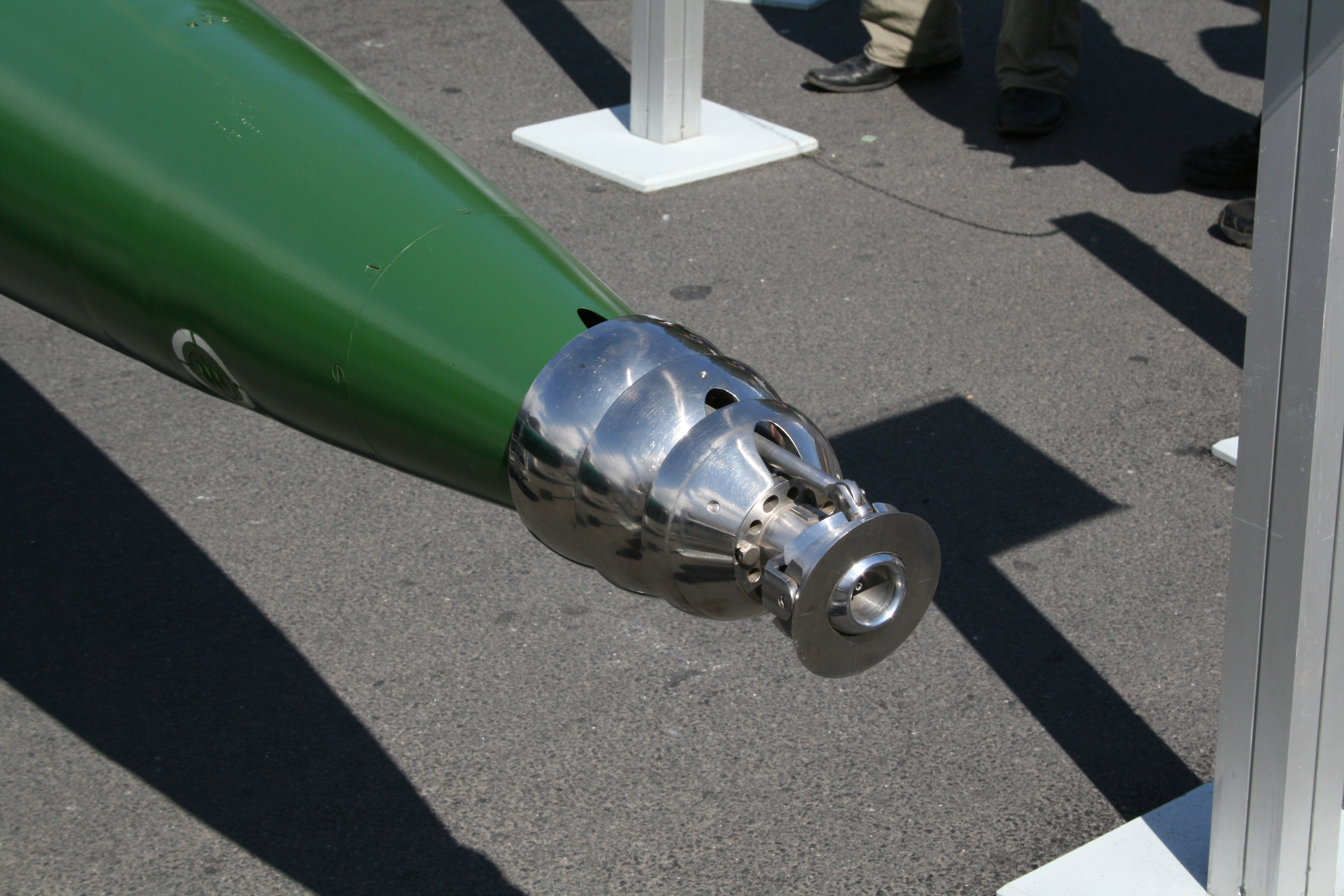
Shkval nose cone

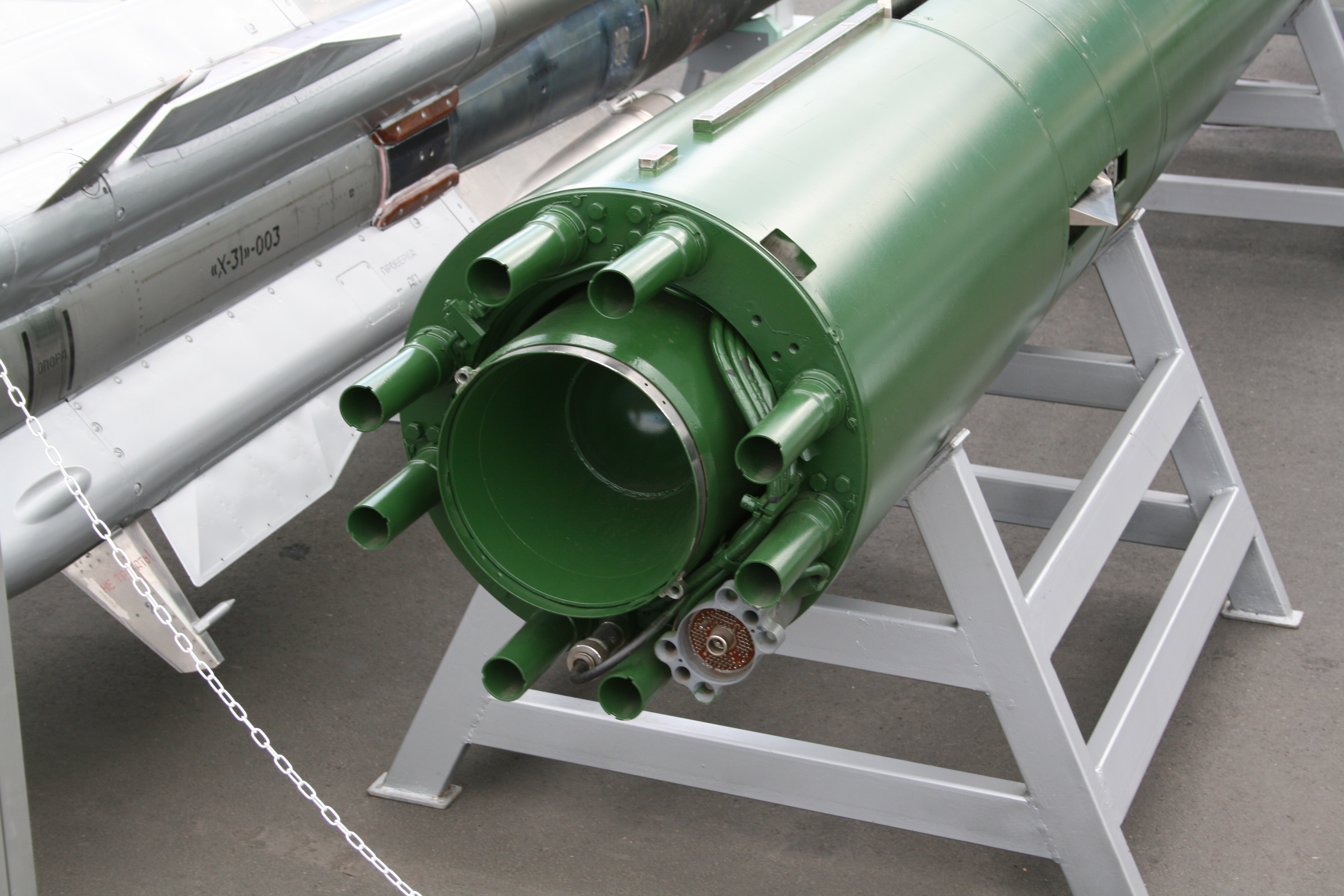
Shkval rear, showing the guidance fins and the electronics connector

The VA-111 is launched from 533 mm (21 in) torpedo tubes at 50 kn (93 km/h; 58 mph). A solid-fuel rocket accelerates it to cavitation speed, with a combined-cycle gas turbine in the nose creating the required gas bubble. Once accelerated, speed is maintained by an underwater ramjet fueled by hydroreactive metals using seawater as both reactant and the source of oxidizer; the torpedo travels at around 200 kn (370 km/h; 230 mph).

Some reports indicate that the VA-111 possibly exceeds speeds of 250 kn (460 km/h; 290 mph), and that work on a 300 kn (560 km/h; 350 mph) version was underway.

The high speed is made possible by supercavitation, whereby a gas bubble surrounding the torpedo is created by outward deflection of water by its specially-shaped nose cone and the expansion of gases from its engine and the gas generator in the nose. This minimizes water contact with the torpedo, significantly reducing drag.

Early designs may have relied solely on an inertial guidance system. The initial design was intended for nuclear warhead delivery. Later designs reportedly include terminal guidance and conventional warheads.

The torpedo steers using four fins that skim the inner surface of the supercavitation gas bubble. To change direction, the fin(s) on the inside of the desired turn are extended, and the opposing fins are retracted.

In 2016, KTRV was upgrading Shkval.

== Manufacture ==
The torpedo is manufactured in Kyrgyzstan by the "Dastan" state-owned factory. In 2012 the Russian government asked for a 75% ownership of the factory in exchange for writing off $180 million Kyrgyz debt to Russia.

== Espionage ==
In 2000, former U.S. Naval intelligence officer and an alleged Defense Intelligence Agency (DIA) spy Edmond Pope (Captain, USN, retired) was held, tried, and convicted in Russia of espionage related to information he obtained about the Shkval weapon system. Russian President Vladimir Putin pardoned Pope in December 2000 on humanitarian grounds because he had bone cancer.

== Operators ==
- Iran
  - Islamic Republic of Iran Navy
- Russia
  - Russian Navy
- Vietnam
  - Vietnam People's Navy

== Variants ==
There are at least three variants:

- VA-111 Shkval – Original variant; GOLIS autonomous inertial guidance.
- "Shkval 2" – Current variant; believed to have additional guidance systems, possibly via the use of vectored thrust, and with a much longer range.
- A less capable version currently being exported to foreign naval forces. The export version is referred to as "Shkval-E".

All current versions are believed to be fitted only with conventional explosive warheads, although the original design used a nuclear warhead.

== Specifications ==
- Length: 8.2 m (26 ft 11 in)
- Diameter: 532 mm (21 in)
- Weight: 2,700 kg (6,000 lb)
- Warhead weight: 210 kg (460 lb)
- Speed
  - Launch speed: 50 knots (93 km/h; 58 mph)
  - Maximum speed: 200 knots (370 km/h; 230 mph) or greater
- Range: Around 11–15 km (6.8–9.3 mi) (new version). Older versions only 7 km (4.3 mi)

== Sources ==
- Polmar, Norman (2004). Cold War Submarines: The Design and Construction of U.S. and Soviet Submarines. Dulles: Potomac Books. ISBN 978-1-57488-594-1.
- Garanin, I. V. (2009). "The Hydro-Reacting Marine Solid Fuel Rocket Engines". In Favorsky, Oleg N. (ed.). Thermal to Mechanical Energy Conversion :Engines and Requirements. Vol. II. Oxford, United Kingdom: EOLSS Publications. pp. 201–238. ISBN 978-1-84826-022-1.
- Baker, A. D. III, ed. (2000). Combat Fleets of the World 2000–2001: Their Ships, Aircraft, and Systems. Annapolis, Maryland: Naval Institute Press.
