= Submarine =

Watercraft capable of independent underwater operation

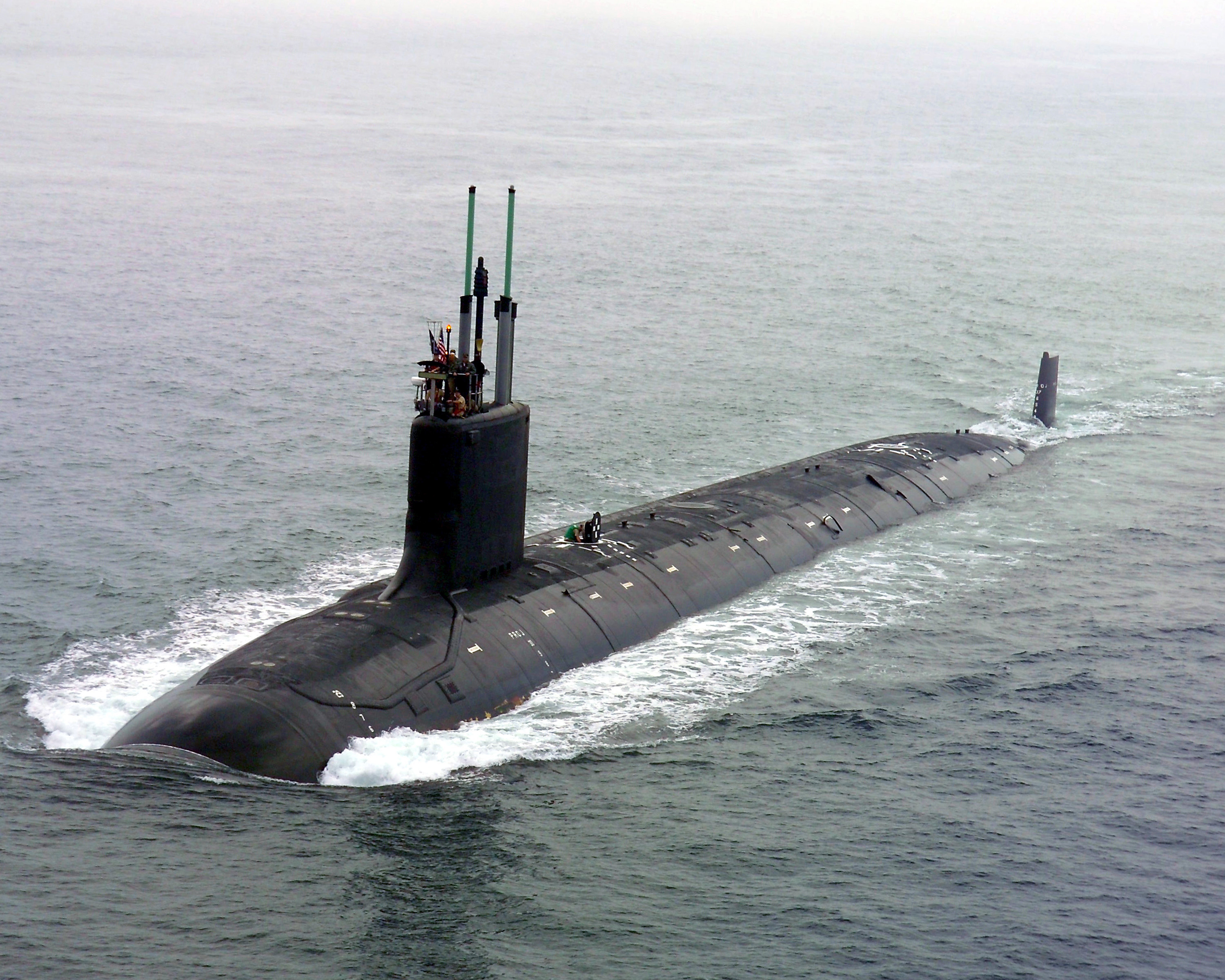
- US Virginia-class submarine underway in Groton, Connecticut, July 2004
- Classification: Watercraft
- Industry: Arms
- Application: Underwater warfare
- Inventor: Cornelis Drebbel
- Invented: 1620 (406 years ago)

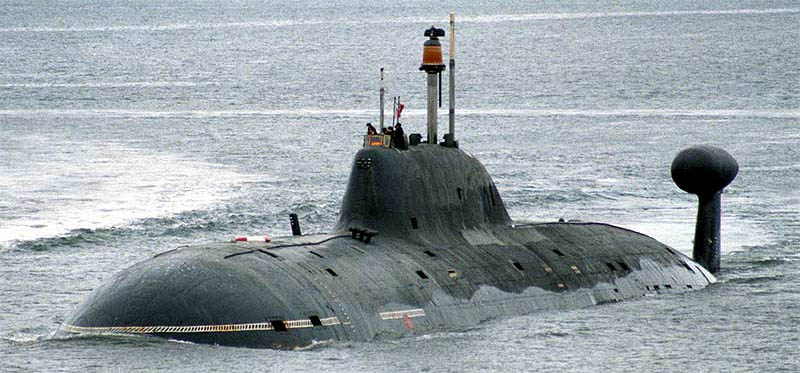
Russian Akula-class submarine of the Northern Fleet, in 2008

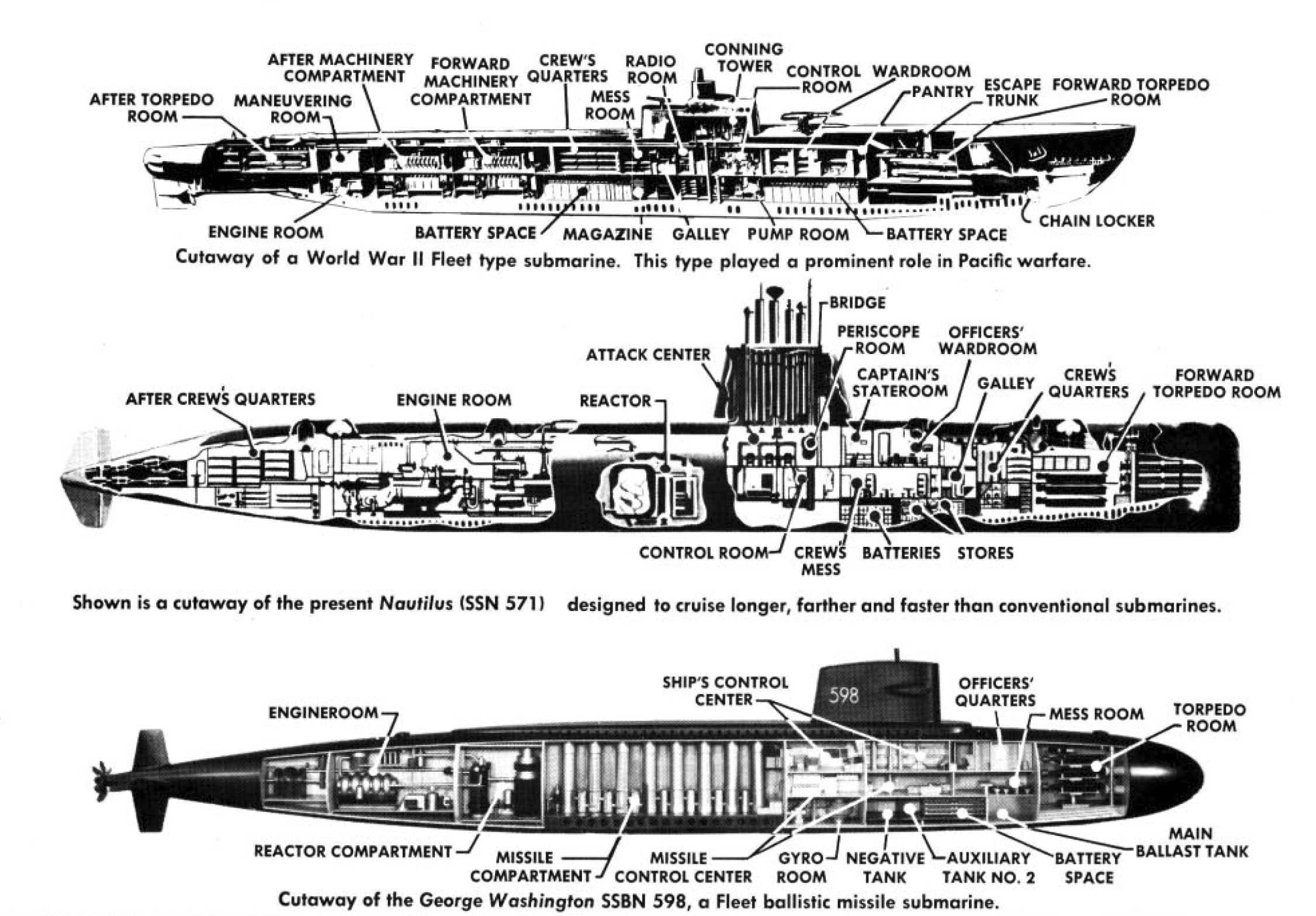
World War II fleet submarine (Gato, Balao or Tench class), commissioned 1941–1945; The first nuclear-powered submarine USS Nautilus (SSN-571), commissioned 1954; The ballistic missile submarine USS George Washington (SSBN-598), commissioned 1959

A submarine (often shortened to sub) is a watercraft capable of independent operation underwater. (It differs from a submersible, which has more limited underwater capability.) The term "submarine" is also sometimes used historically or informally to refer to remotely operated vehicles and robots, or to medium-sized or smaller vessels (such as the midget submarine and the wet sub). Submarines are referred to as boats rather than ships regardless of their size.

Although experimental submarines had been built earlier, submarine design took off during the 19th century, and submarines were adopted by several navies. They were first used widely during World War I (1914–1918), and are now used in many navies, large and small. Their military uses include: attacking enemy surface ships (merchant and military) or other submarines; aircraft carrier protection; blockade running; nuclear deterrence; stealth operations in denied areas when gathering intelligence and doing reconnaissance; denying or influencing enemy movements; conventional land attacks (for example, launching a cruise missile); and covert insertion of frogmen or special forces. Their civilian uses include: marine science; salvage; exploration; and facility inspection and maintenance. Submarines can be modified for specialized functions such as search-and-rescue missions and undersea cable repair. They are also used in the tourism industry and in undersea archaeology. Modern deep-diving submarines derive from the bathyscaphe, which evolved from the diving bell.

Most large submarines consist of a cylindrical body with hemispherical (or conical) ends and a vertical structure, usually located amidships, which houses communications and sensing devices as well as periscopes. In modern submarines, this structure is called the "sail" in American usage and "fin" in European usage. A feature of earlier designs was the "conning tower": a separate pressure hull above the main body of the boat that enabled the use of shorter periscopes. There is a propeller (or pump jet) at the rear, and various hydrodynamic control fins. Smaller, deep-diving, and specialty submarines may deviate significantly from this traditional design. Submarines dive and resurface by using diving planes and by changing the amount of water and air in ballast tanks to affect their buoyancy.

Submarines encompass a wide range of types and capabilities. They range from small, autonomous examples, such as one- or two-person subs that operate for a few hours, to vessels that can remain submerged for six months, such as the Russian Typhoon class (the biggest submarines ever built). Submarines can work at depths that are greater than what is practicable (or even survivable) for human divers. More countries are building and operating submarines today than ever before in modern history, and China is leading the construction surge.

== History ==
=== Etymology ===
The word submarine means 'underwater' or 'under-sea' (as in submarine canyon, submarine pipeline) though as a noun it generally refers to a vessel that can travel underwater. The term is a contraction of submarine boat and occurs as such in several languages, e.g. French (sous-marin), and Spanish (submarino), although others retain the original term, such as Dutch (Onderzeeboot), German (Unterseeboot), Swedish (Undervattensbåt), and Russian (подводная лодка: podvodnaya lodka), all of which mean 'submarine boat'. By naval tradition, submarines are usually referred to as boats rather than as ships, regardless of their size. Although referred to informally as boats, U.S. submarines employ the designation USS (United States Ship) at the beginning of their names, such as USS Alabama. In the Royal Navy, the designation HMS can refer to "His Majesty's Ship" or "His Majesty's Submarine", though the latter is sometimes rendered "HMS/m". (Note: For example, see HMS/m Tireless, at IWM, HMS/m A.1 at Historic England)

=== Early human-powered submersibles ===
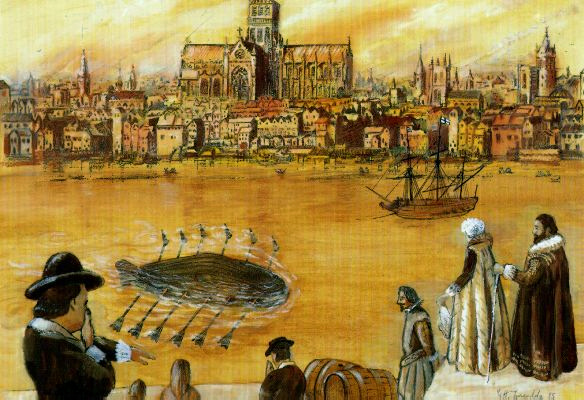
An early submersible craft, built by Cornelis Drebbel, propelled by oars

==== 16th and 17th centuries ====
According to a report in Opusculum Taisnieri published in 1562:

Two Greeks submerged and surfaced in the river Tagus near the City of Toledo several times in the presence of The Holy Roman Emperor Charles V, without getting wet and with the flame they carried in their hands still alight.

In 1578, the English mathematician William Bourne recorded in his book Inventions or Devises one of the first plans for an underwater navigation vehicle. A few years later the Scottish mathematician and theologian John Napier wrote in his Secret Inventions (1596) that "These inventions besides devises of sayling under water with divers other devises and strategems for harming of the enemyes by the Grace of God and worke of expert Craftsmen I hope to perform." It is unclear whether he carried out his idea.

Jerónimo de Ayanz y Beaumont (1553–1613) created detailed designs for two types of air-renovated submersible vehicles. They were equipped with oars, autonomous floating snorkels worked by inner pumps, portholes and gloves used for the crew to manipulate underwater objects. Ayanaz planned to use them for warfare, using them to approach enemy ships undetected and set up timed gunpowder charges on their hulls.

The first submersible of whose construction there exists reliable information was designed and built in 1620 by Cornelis Drebbel, a Dutchman in the service of James I of England. It was propelled by means of oars.

==== 18th century ====
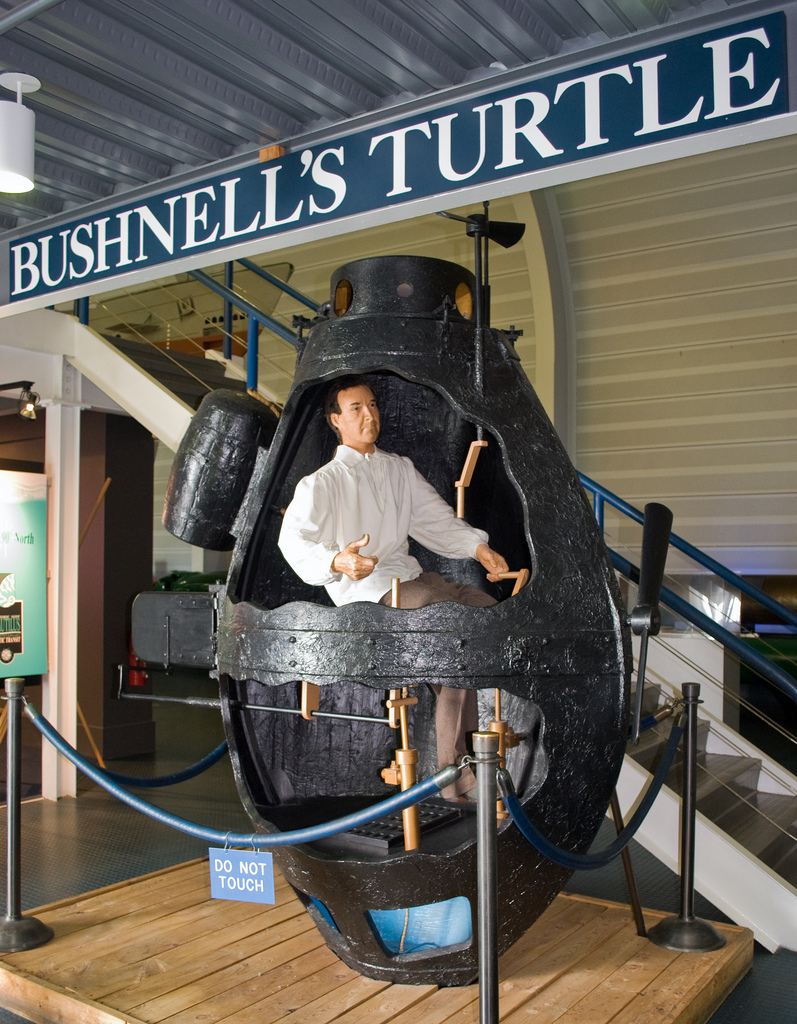
Cutaway replica of Bushnell's "Turtle" at the Submarine Force Library and Museum, Groton, Connecticut

By the mid-18th century, over a dozen patents for submarines/submersible boats had been granted in England. In 1747, Nathaniel Symons patented and built the first known working example of the use of a ballast tank for submersion. His design used leather bags that could fill with water to submerge the craft. A mechanism was used to twist the water out of the bags and cause the boat to resurface. In 1749, the Gentlemen's Magazine reported that a similar design had initially been proposed by Giovanni Borelli in 1680. Further design improvement stagnated for over a century, until application of new technologies for propulsion and stability.

The first military submersible was Turtle (1775), a hand-powered acorn-shaped device designed by the American David Bushnell to accommodate a single person. It was the first verified submarine capable of independent underwater operation and movement, and the first to use screws for propulsion.

==== 19th century ====
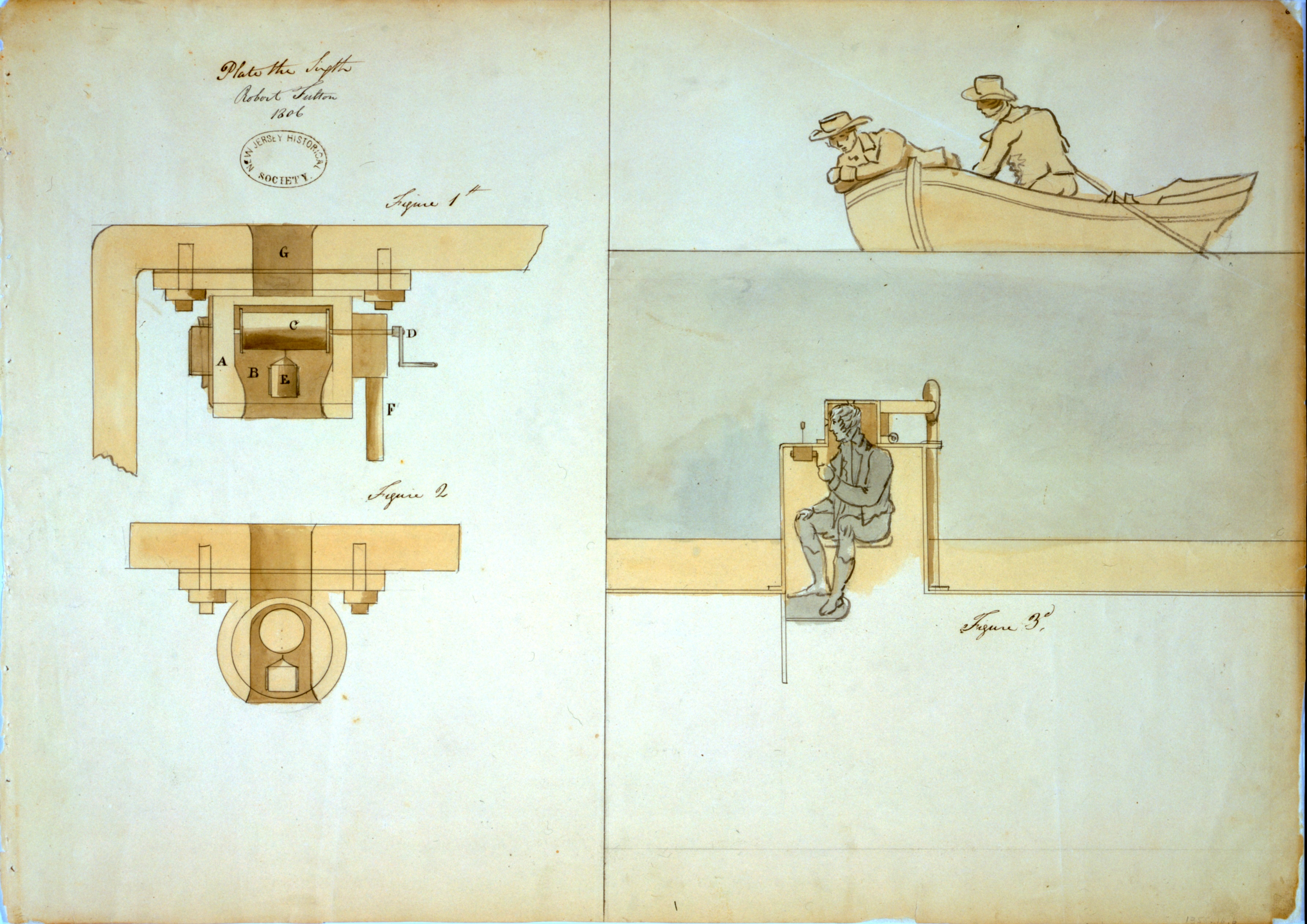
1806 illustration by Robert Fulton showing a "plunging boat"

In 1800, France built Nautilus, a human-powered submarine designed by American Robert Fulton. They gave up on the experiment in 1804, as did the British, when they reconsidered Fulton's submarine design.

In 1850, Wilhelm Bauer's Brandtaucher was built in Germany. It remains the oldest known surviving submarine in the world.

In 1864, late in the American Civil War, the Confederate navy's H. L. Hunley became the first military submarine to sink an enemy vessel, the Union sloop-of-war USS Housatonic, using a gun-powder-filled keg on a spar as a torpedo charge. The Hunley also sank. The explosion's shock waves may have killed its crew instantly, preventing them from pumping the bilge or propelling the submarine.

In 1866, Sub Marine Explorer was the first submarine to successfully dive, cruise underwater, and resurface under the crew's control. The design by German American Julius H. Kroehl (in German, Kröhl) incorporated elements that are still used in modern submarines.

In 1866, Flach was built at the Chilean government's request by Karl Flach, a German engineer and immigrant. It was the fifth submarine built in the world and, along with a second submarine, was intended to defend the port of Valparaíso against attack by the Spanish Navy during the Chincha Islands War.

=== Mechanically powered submarines ===
Submarines could not be put into widespread or routine service use by navies until suitable engines were developed. The era from 1863 to 1904 marked a pivotal time in submarine development, and several important technologies appeared. A number of nations built and used submarines. Diesel electric propulsion became the dominant power system and equipment such as the periscope became standardized. Countries conducted many experiments on effective tactics and weapons for submarines, which led to their large impact in World War I.

==== 1863–1904 ====
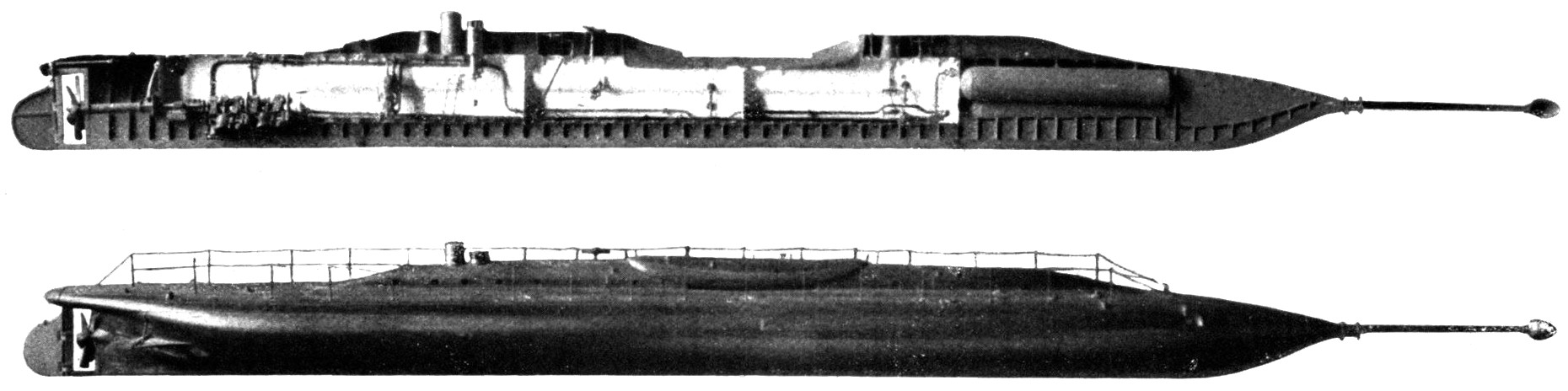
The French submarine Plongeur

The first submarine not relying on human power for propulsion was the French Plongeur (Diver), launched in 1863, which used compressed air at 1,200 kPa (180 psi). Narcís Monturiol designed the first air-independent and combustion-powered submarine, Ictíneo II, which was launched in Barcelona, Spain in 1864.

The submarine became feasible as potential weapon with the development of the Whitehead torpedo, designed in 1866 by British engineer Robert Whitehead, the first practical self-propelled torpedo. The spar torpedo that had been developed earlier by the Confederate States Navy was considered to be impracticable, as it was believed to have sunk both its intended target, and H. L. Hunley, the submarine that deployed it.

The Irish inventor John Philip Holland built a model submarine in 1876 and in 1878 demonstrated the Holland I prototype. This was followed by a number of unsuccessful designs. In 1896, he designed the Holland Type VI submarine, which used internal combustion engine power on the surface and electric battery power underwater. Launched on 17 May 1897 at Navy Lt. Lewis Nixon's Crescent Shipyard in Elizabeth, New Jersey, Holland VI was purchased by the United States Navy on 11 April 1900, becoming the Navy's first commissioned submarine, christened USS Holland.

Discussions between the English clergyman and inventor George Garrett and the Swedish industrialist Thorsten Nordenfelt led to the first practical steam-powered submarines, armed with torpedoes and ready for military use. The first was Nordenfelt I, a 56-tonne, 19.5-metre (64 ft) vessel similar to Garrett's ill-fated Resurgam (1879), with a range of 240 kilometres (130 nmi; 150 mi), armed with a single torpedo, in 1885.

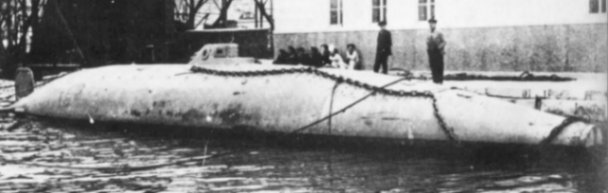
Peral at Cartagena, 1888

A reliable means of propulsion for the submerged vessel was only made possible in the 1880s with the advent of the necessary electric battery technology. The first electrically powered boats were built by Isaac Peral y Caballero in Spain (who built Peral), Dupuy de Lôme (who built Gymnote) and Gustave Zédé (who built Sirène) in France, and James Franklin Waddington (who built Porpoise) in England. Peral's design featured torpedoes and other systems that later became standard in submarines.

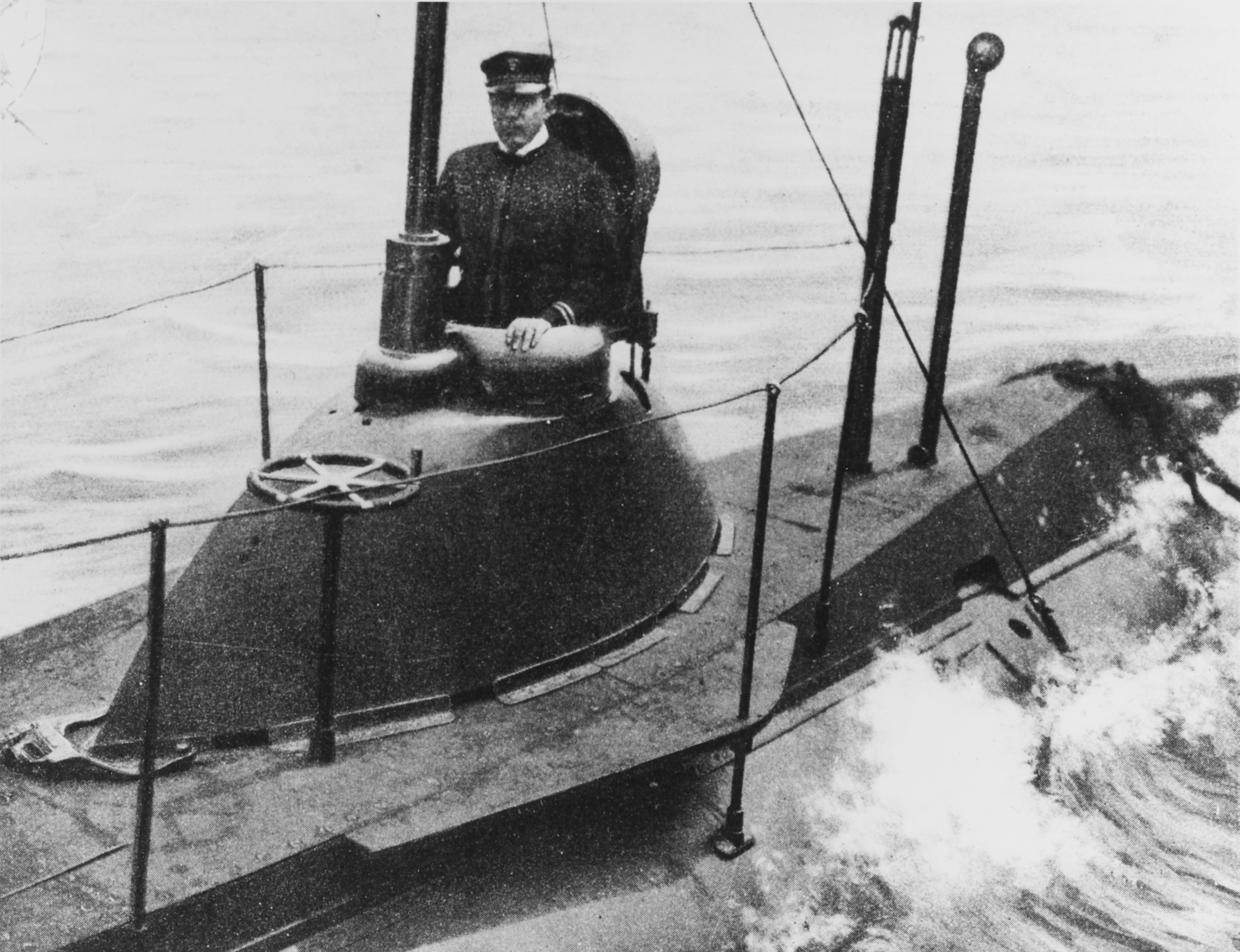
USS Plunger, launched in 1902

Commissioned in June 1900, the French steam and electric Narval employed the now typical double-hull design, with a pressure hull inside the outer shell. These 200-ton ships had a range of over 160 km (100 mi) underwater. The French submarine Aigrette in 1904 further improved the concept by using a diesel rather than a gasoline engine for surface power. Large numbers of these submarines were built, with seventy-six completed before 1914.

The Royal Navy commissioned five Holland-class submarines from Vickers, Barrow-in-Furness, under licence from the Holland Torpedo Boat Company from 1901 to 1903. Construction of the boats took longer than anticipated, with the first only ready for a diving trial at sea on 6 April 1902. Although the design had been purchased entirely from the US company, the actual design used was an untested improvement to the original Holland design using a new 180 horsepower (130 kW) petrol engine.

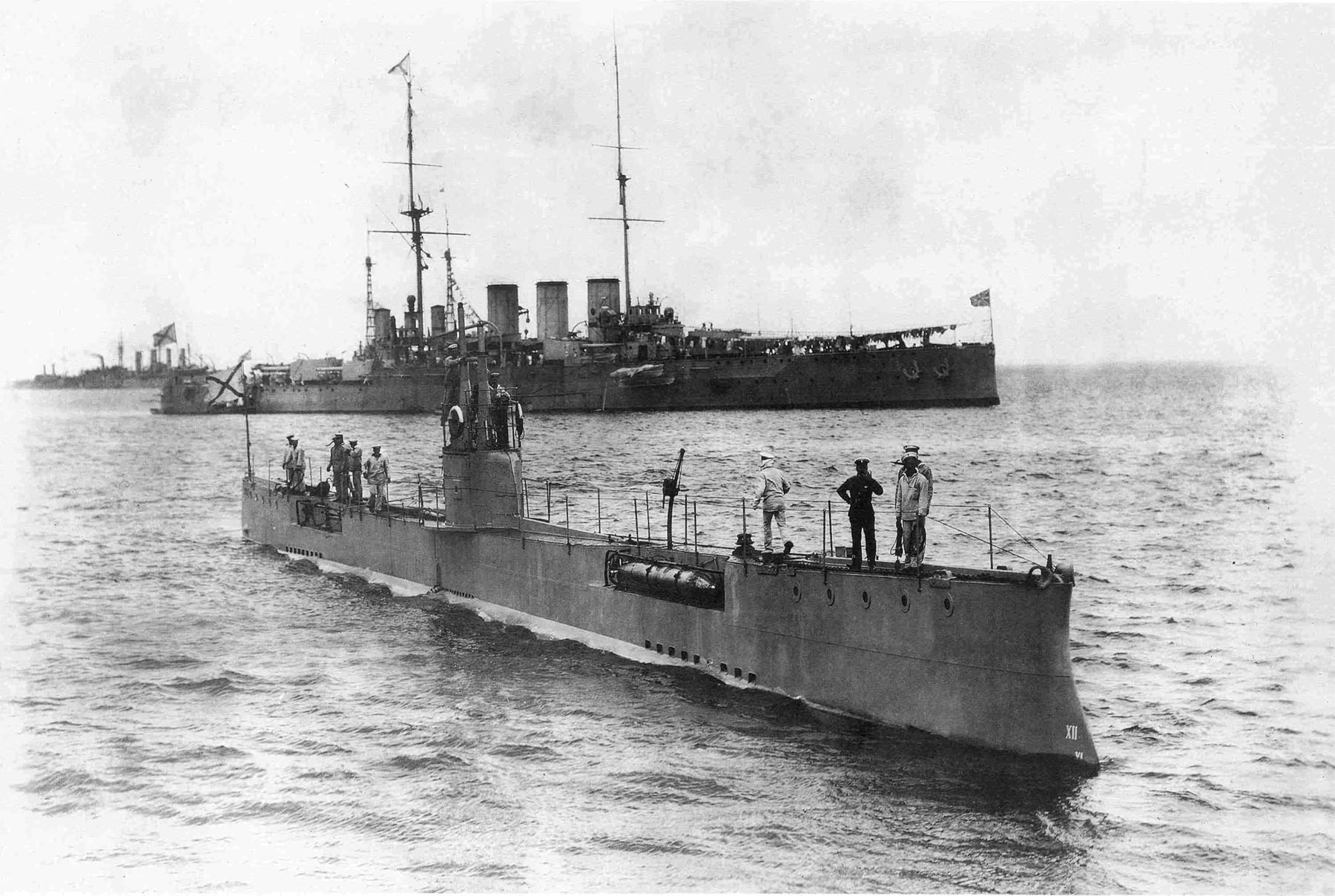
Akula (launched in 1907) was the first Russian submarine able to cruise long distances.

These types of submarines were first used during the Russo-Japanese War of 1904–05. Due to the blockade at Port Arthur, the Russians sent their submarines to Vladivostok, where by 1 January 1905 there were seven boats, enough to create the world's first "operational submarine fleet". The new submarine fleet began patrols on 14 February, usually lasting for about 24 hours each. The first confrontation with Japanese warships occurred on 29 April 1905 when the Russian submarine Som was fired upon by Japanese torpedo boats, but then withdrew.

==== World War I ====
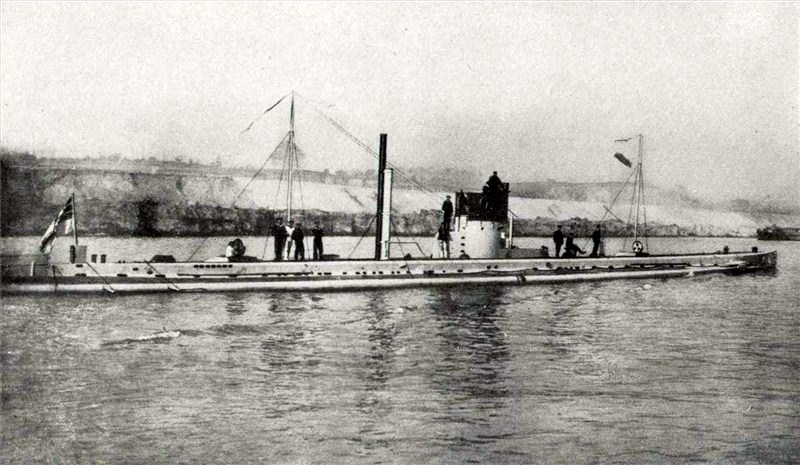
The German submarine SM U-9, which sank three British cruisers in less than an hour in September 1914

Military submarines first made a significant impact in World War I. Forces such as the U-boats of Germany saw action in the First Battle of the Atlantic, and were responsible for sinking RMS Lusitania, which was sunk as a result of unrestricted submarine warfare and is often cited among the reasons for the entry of the United States into the war.

At the outbreak of the war, Germany had only twenty submarines available for combat, although these included vessels of the diesel-engined U-19 class, which had a sufficient range of 5,000 miles (8,000 km) and speed of 8 knots (15 km/h) to allow them to operate effectively around the entire British coast. By contrast, the Royal Navy had a total of 74 submarines, though of mixed effectiveness. In August 1914, a flotilla of ten U-boats sailed from their base in Heligoland to attack Royal Navy warships in the North Sea in the first submarine war patrol in history.

The U-boats' ability to function as practical war machines relied on new tactics, their numbers, and submarine technologies such as combination diesel–electric power system developed in the preceding years. More submersibles than true submarines, U-boats operated primarily on the surface using regular engines, submerging occasionally to attack under battery power. They were roughly triangular in cross-section, with a distinct keel to control rolling while surfaced, and a distinct bow. During World War I more than 5,000 Allied ships were sunk by U-boats.

The British responded to the German developments in submarine technology with the creation of the K-class submarines. However, these submarines were notoriously dangerous to operate due to their various design flaws and poor maneuverability.

==== World War II ====
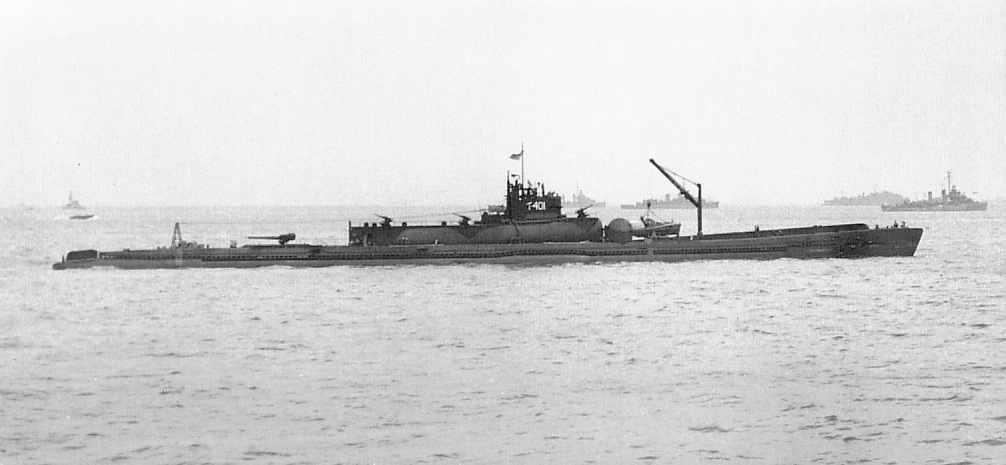
The Imperial Japanese Navy's I-400-class submarine, the largest submarine type of WWII

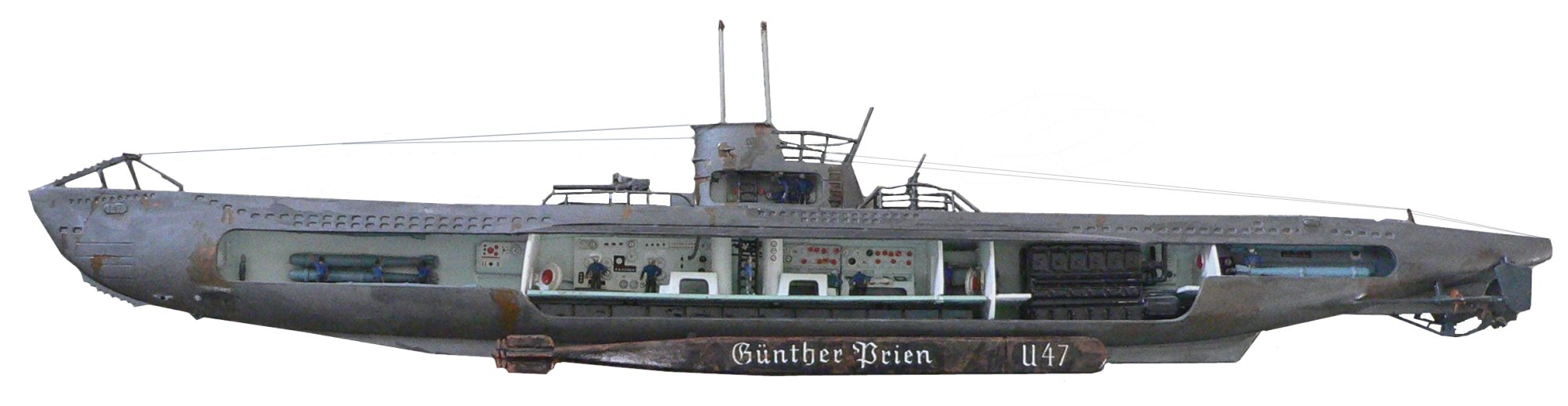
A model of Günther Prien's U-47, German WWII Type VII diesel–electric hunter

During World War II, Germany used submarines to devastating effect in the Battle of the Atlantic, where it attempted to cut Britain's supply routes by sinking more merchant ships than Britain could replace. These merchant ships were vital to supply Britain's population with food, industry with raw material, and armed forces with fuel and armaments. Although the U-boats had been updated in the interwar years, the major innovation was improved communications, encrypted using the Enigma cipher machine. This allowed for mass-attack naval tactics (Rudeltaktik, commonly known as "wolfpack"), which ultimately ceased to be effective when the U-boat's Enigma was cracked. By the end of the war, almost 3,000 Allied ships (175 warships, 2,825 merchantmen) had been sunk by U-boats. Although successful early in the war, Germany's U-boat fleet suffered heavy casualties, losing 793 U-boats and about 28,000 submariners out of 41,000, a casualty rate of about 70%.

The Imperial Japanese Navy operated the most varied fleet of submarines of any navy, including Kaiten crewed torpedoes, midget submarines (Type A Ko-hyoteki and Kairyu classes), medium-range submarines, purpose-built supply submarines and long-range fleet submarines. They also had submarines with the highest submerged speeds during World War II (I-201-class submarines) and submarines that could carry multiple aircraft (I-400-class submarines). They were also equipped with one of the most advanced torpedoes of the conflict, the oxygen-propelled Type 95. Nevertheless, despite their technical prowess, Japan chose to use its submarines for fleet warfare, and consequently were relatively unsuccessful, as warships were fast, maneuverable and well-defended compared to merchant ships.

The submarine force was the most effective anti-ship weapon in the American arsenal. Submarines, though only about 2 percent of the U.S. Navy, destroyed over 30 percent of the Japanese Navy, including 8 aircraft carriers, 1 battleship and 11 cruisers. US submarines also destroyed over 60 percent of the Japanese merchant fleet, crippling Japan's ability to supply its military forces and industrial war effort. Allied submarines in the Pacific War destroyed more Japanese shipping than all other weapons combined. This feat was considerably aided by the Imperial Japanese Navy's failure to provide adequate escort forces for the nation's merchant fleet.

During World War II, 314 submarines served in the US Navy, of which nearly 260 were deployed to the Pacific. When the Japanese attacked Hawaii in December 1941, 111 boats were in commission; 203 submarines from the Gato, Balao, and Tench classes were commissioned during the war. During the war, 52 US submarines were lost to all causes, with 48 directly due to hostilities. US submarines sank 1,560 enemy vessels, a total tonnage of 5.3 million tons (55% of the total sunk).

The Royal Navy Submarine Service was used primarily in the classic Axis blockade. Its major operating areas were around Norway, in the Mediterranean (against the Axis supply routes to North Africa), and in the Far East. In that war, British submarines sank 2 million tons of enemy shipping and 57 major warships, the latter including 35 submarines. Among these is the only documented instance of a submarine sinking another submarine while both were submerged. This occurred when HMS Venturer engaged U-864; the Venturer crew manually computed a successful firing solution against a three-dimensionally maneuvering target using techniques which became the basis of modern torpedo computer targeting systems. Seventy-four British submarines were lost, the majority, forty-two, in the Mediterranean.

==== Cold-War military models ====
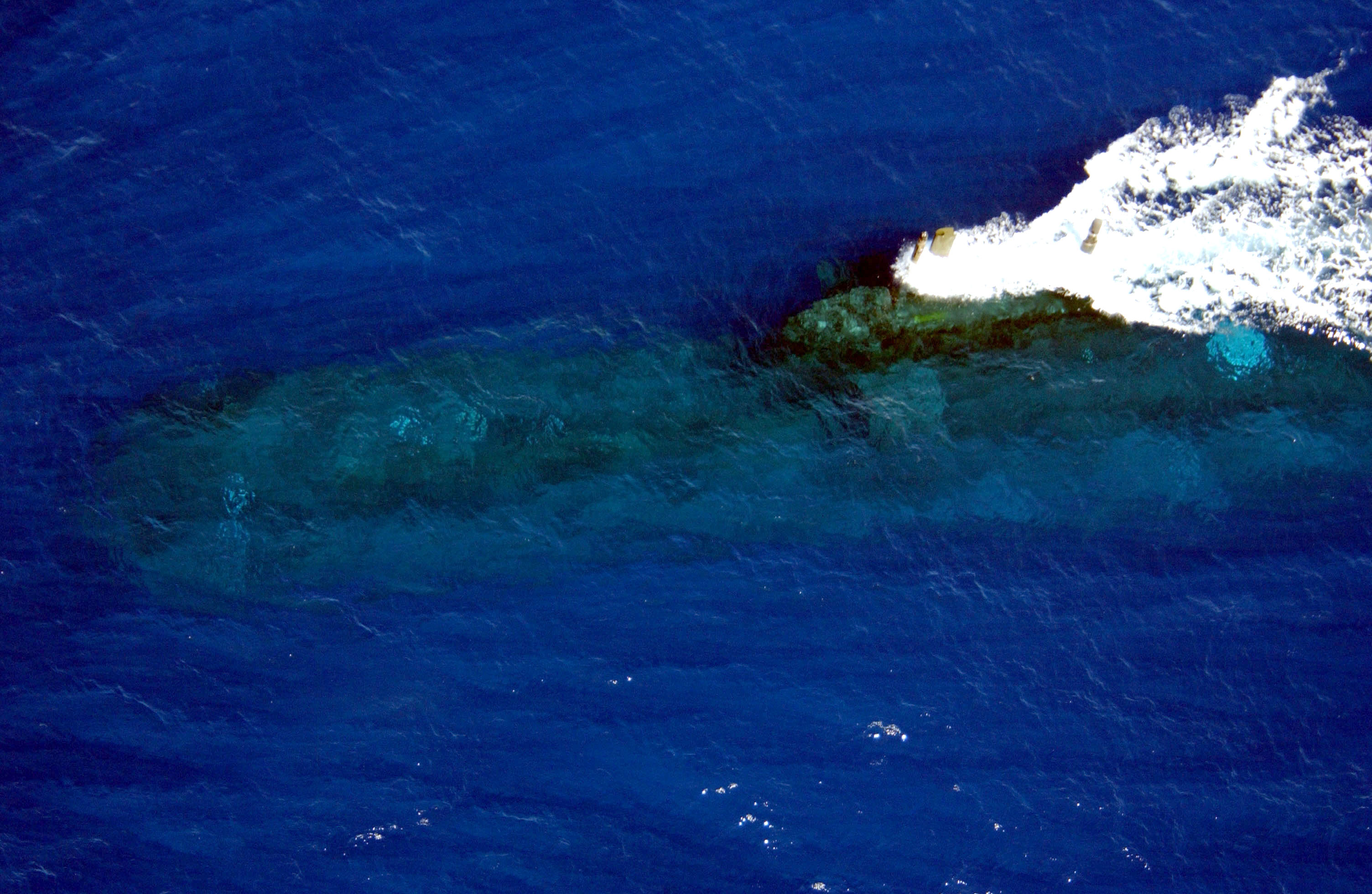
HMAS Rankin, a Collins-class submarine at periscope depth

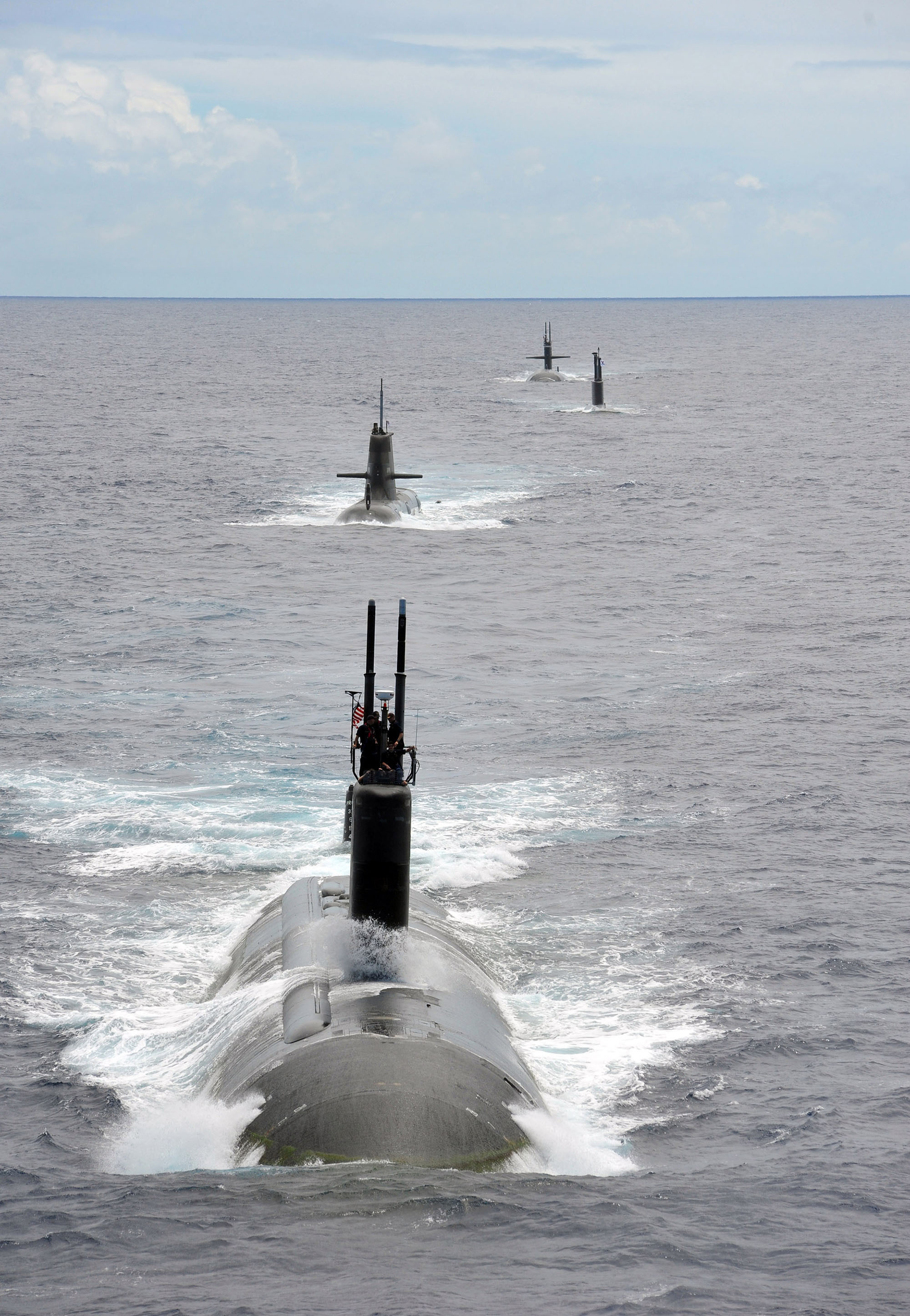
USS Charlotte, a Los Angeles-class submarine runs with submarines from partner nations during RIMPAC 2014.

The first launch of a cruise missile (SSM-N-8 Regulus) from a submarine occurred in July 1953, from the deck of USS Tunny, a World War II fleet boat modified to carry the missile with a nuclear warhead. Tunny and its sister boat, Barbero, were the United States' first nuclear deterrent patrol submarines. In the 1950s, nuclear power partially replaced diesel–electric propulsion. Equipment was also developed to extract oxygen from sea water. These two innovations gave submarines the ability to remain submerged for weeks or months. Most of the naval submarines built since that time in the US, the Soviet Union (now Russia), the UK, and France have been powered by a nuclear reactor.

In 1959–1960, the first ballistic missile submarines were put into service by both the United States (George Washington class) and the Soviet Union (Golf class) as part of the Cold War nuclear deterrent strategy.

During the Cold War, the US and the Soviet Union maintained large submarine fleets that engaged in cat-and-mouse games. The Soviet Union lost at least four submarines during this period: K-129 was lost in 1968 (a part of which the CIA retrieved from the ocean floor with the Howard Hughes-designed ship Glomar Explorer), K-8 in 1970, K-219 in 1986, and Komsomolets in 1989 (which held a depth record among military submarines—1,000 m (3,300 ft)). Many other Soviet subs, such as K-19 (the first Soviet nuclear submarine, and the first Soviet sub to reach the North Pole) were badly damaged by fire or radiation leaks. The US lost two nuclear submarines during this time: USS Thresher due to equipment failure during a test dive while at its operational limit, and USS Scorpion due to unknown causes.

During the Indo-Pakistani War of 1971, the Pakistan Navy's Hangor sank the Indian frigate INS Khukri. This was the first sinking by a submarine since World War II. During the same war, Ghazi, a Tench-class submarine on loan to Pakistan from the US, was sunk by the Indian Navy. It was the first submarine combat loss since World War II. In 1982 during the Falklands War, the Argentine cruiser General Belgrano was sunk by the British submarine HMS Conqueror, the first sinking by a nuclear-powered submarine in war. Some weeks later, on 16 June, during the Lebanon War, an unnamed Israeli submarine torpedoed and sank the Lebanese coaster Transit, which was carrying 56 Palestinian refugees to Cyprus, in the belief that the vessel was evacuating anti-Israeli militias. The ship was hit by two torpedoes, managed to run aground but eventually sank. There were 25 dead, including her captain. The Israeli Navy disclosed the incident in November 2018.

== Usage ==
=== Military ===
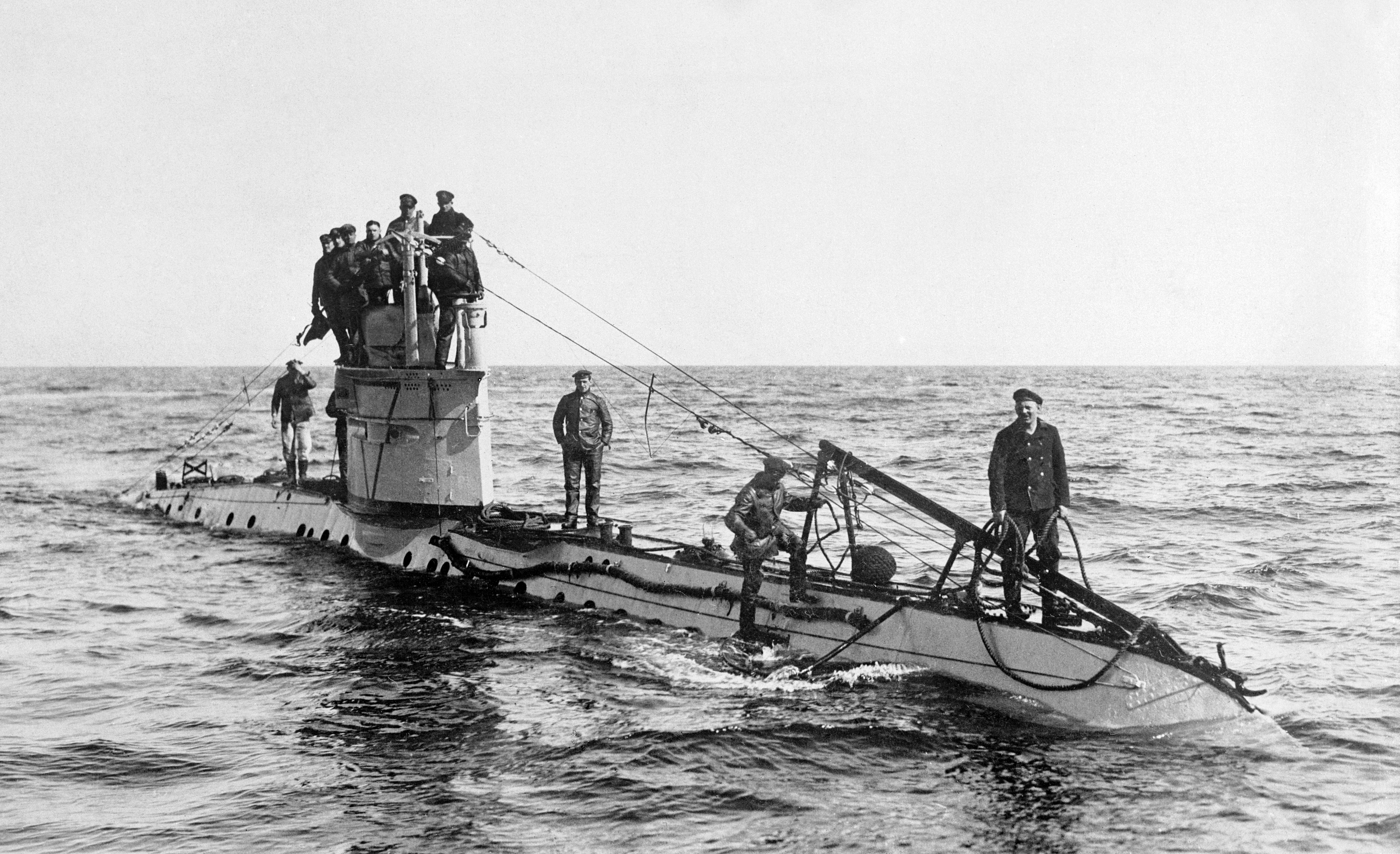
German UC-1-class World War I submarine. The wires running up from the bow to the conning tower are the jumping wires

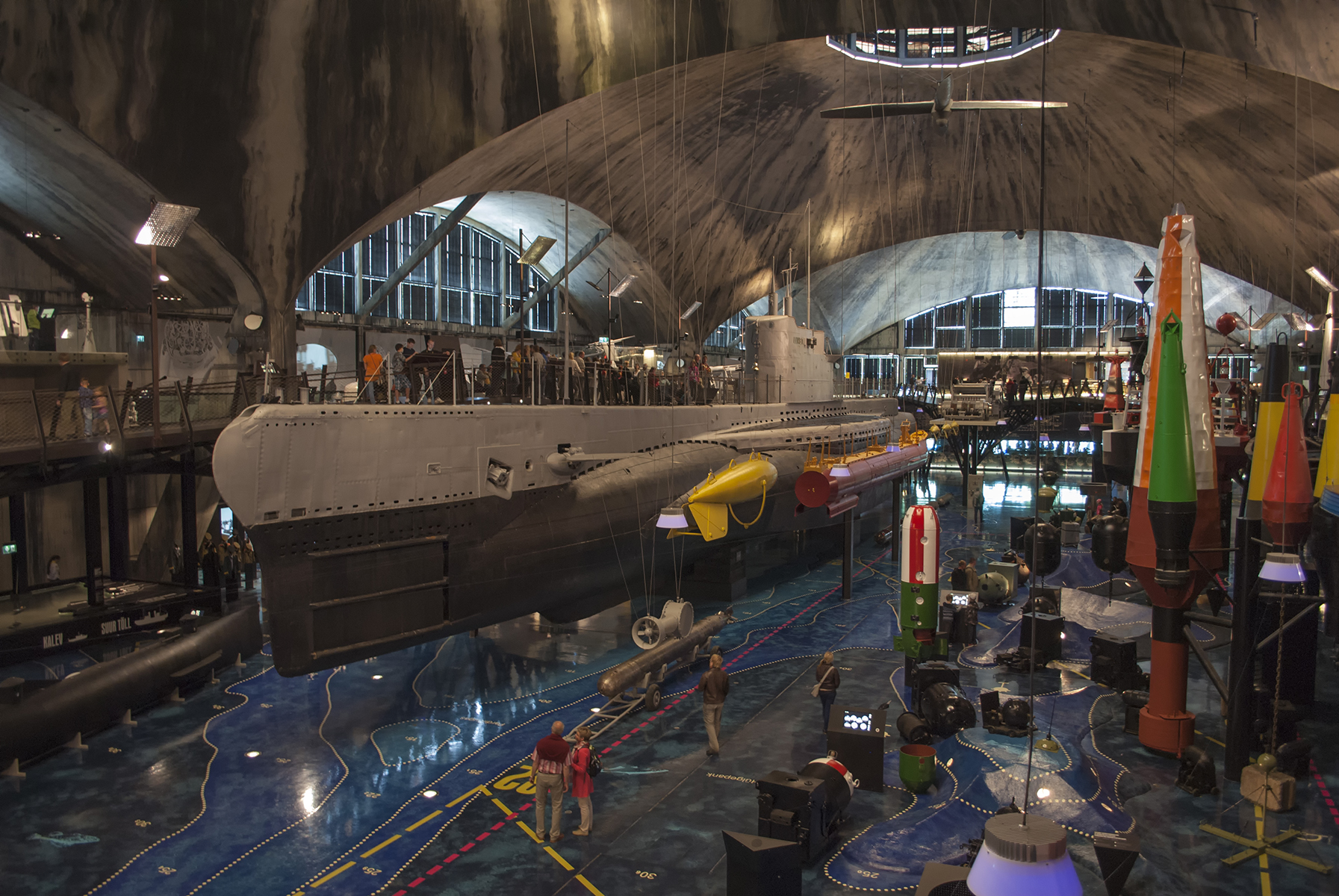
EML Lembit in the Estonian Maritime Museum. The Lembit is the only minelayer submarine of its series left in the world.

Before and during World War II, the primary role of the submarine was anti-surface ship warfare. Submarines would attack either on the surface using deck guns, or submerged using torpedoes. They were particularly effective in sinking Allied transatlantic shipping in both World Wars, and in disrupting Japanese supply routes and naval operations in the Pacific in World War II.

Mine-laying submarines were developed in the early part of the 20th century. The facility was used in both World Wars. Submarines were also used for inserting and removing covert agents and military forces in special operations, for intelligence gathering, and to rescue aircrew during air attacks on islands, where the airmen would be told of safe places to crash-land so the submarines could rescue them. Submarines could carry cargo through hostile waters or act as supply vessels for other submarines.

Submarines could usually locate and attack other submarines only on the surface, although HMS Venturer managed to sink U-864 with a four torpedo spread while both were submerged. The British developed a specialized anti-submarine submarine in WWI, the R class. After WWII, with the development of the homing torpedo, better sonar systems, and nuclear propulsion, submarines also became able to hunt each other effectively.

The development of submarine-launched ballistic missile and submarine-launched cruise missiles gave submarines a substantial and long-ranged ability to attack both land and sea targets with a variety of weapons ranging from cluster bombs to nuclear weapons.

The primary defense of a submarine lies in its ability to remain concealed in the depths of the ocean. Early submarines could be detected by the sound they made. Water is an excellent conductor of sound (much better than air), and submarines can detect and track comparatively noisy surface ships from long distances. Modern submarines are built with an emphasis on stealth. Advanced propeller designs, extensive sound-reducing insulation, and special machinery help a submarine remain as quiet as ambient ocean noise, making them difficult to detect. It takes specialized technology to find and attack modern submarines.

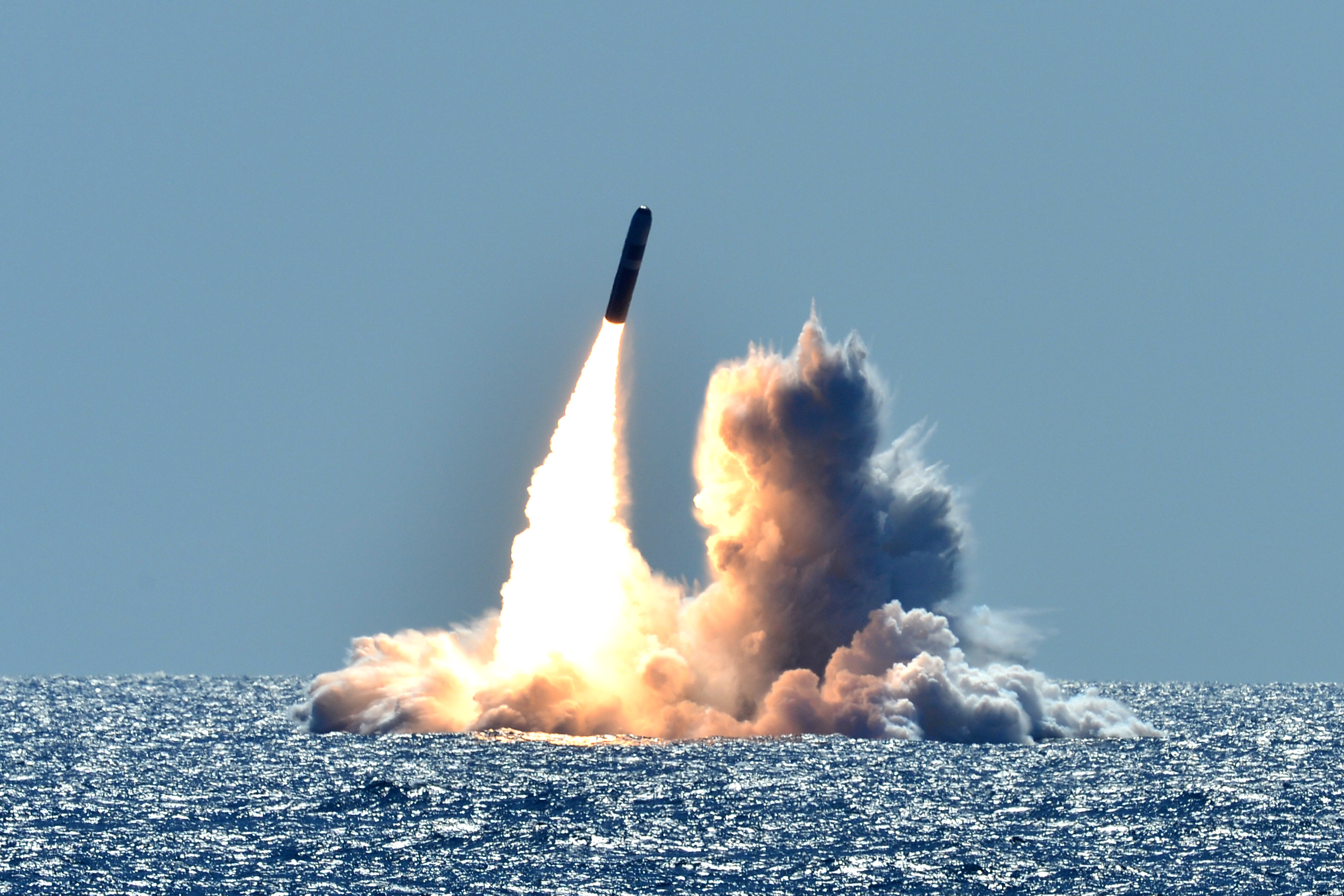
Trident II D5 is one of the most advanced submarine-launched ballistic missiles

Active sonar uses the reflection of sound emitted from the search equipment to detect submarines. It has been used since WWII by surface ships, submarines and aircraft (via dropped buoys and helicopter "dipping" arrays), but it reveals the emitter's position, and is susceptible to counter-measures.

A concealed military submarine is a real threat, and because of its stealth, can force an enemy navy to waste resources searching large areas of ocean and protecting ships against attack. This advantage was vividly demonstrated in the 1982 Falklands War when the British nuclear-powered submarine HMS Conqueror sank the Argentine cruiser General Belgrano. After the sinking the Argentine Navy recognized that they had no effective defense against submarine attack, and the Argentine surface fleet withdrew to port for the remainder of the war. An Argentine submarine remained at sea, however.

=== Civilian ===
Although the majority of the world's submarines are military, there are some civilian submarines, which are used for tourism, exploration, oil and gas platform inspections, and pipeline surveys. Some are also used in illegal activities.

The Submarine Voyage ride opened at Disneyland in 1959, but although it ran under water, it was not a true submarine, as it ran on tracks and was open to the atmosphere. The first tourist submarine was Auguste Piccard, which went into service in 1964 at Expo64. By 1997, there were 45 tourist submarines operating around the world. Submarines with a crush depth in the range of 400–500 feet (120–150 m) are operated in several areas worldwide, typically with bottom depths around 100 to 120 feet (30 to 37 m), with a carrying capacity of 50 to 100 passengers.

In a typical operation a surface vessel carries passengers to an offshore operating area and loads them into the submarine. The submarine then visits underwater points of interest such as natural or artificial reef structures. To surface safely without danger of collision the location of the submarine is marked with an air release and movement to the surface is coordinated by an observer in a support craft.

A recent development is the deployment of so-called narco-submarines by South American drug smugglers to evade law enforcement detection. Although they occasionally deploy true submarines, most are self-propelled semi-submersibles, where a portion of the craft remains above water at all times. In September 2011, Colombian authorities seized a 16-meter-long submersible that could hold a crew of 5, costing about $2 million. The vessel belonged to FARC rebels and had the capacity to carry at least 7 tonnes of drugs.

Civilian submarines

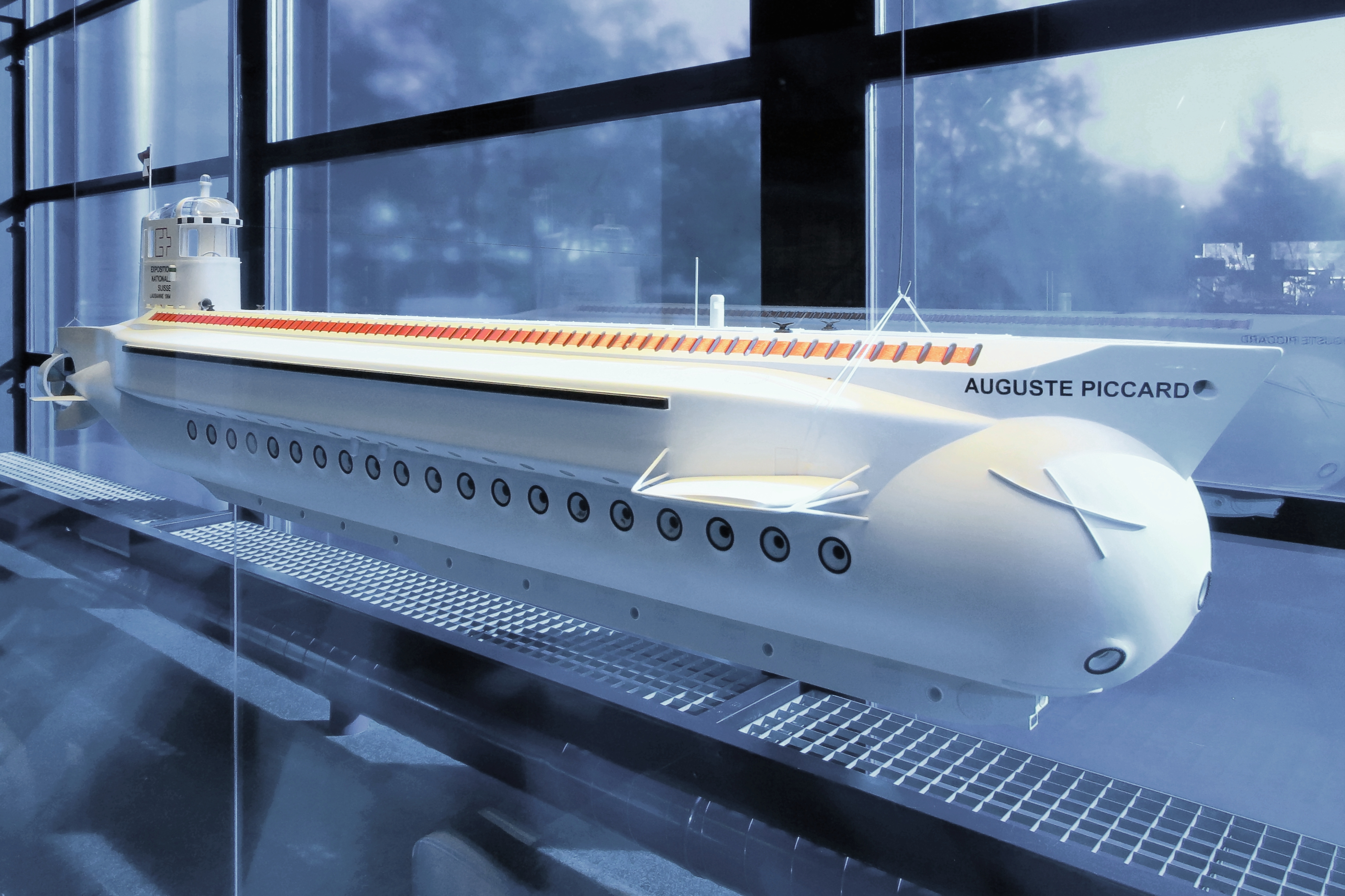
Model of the Mésoscaphe Auguste Piccard

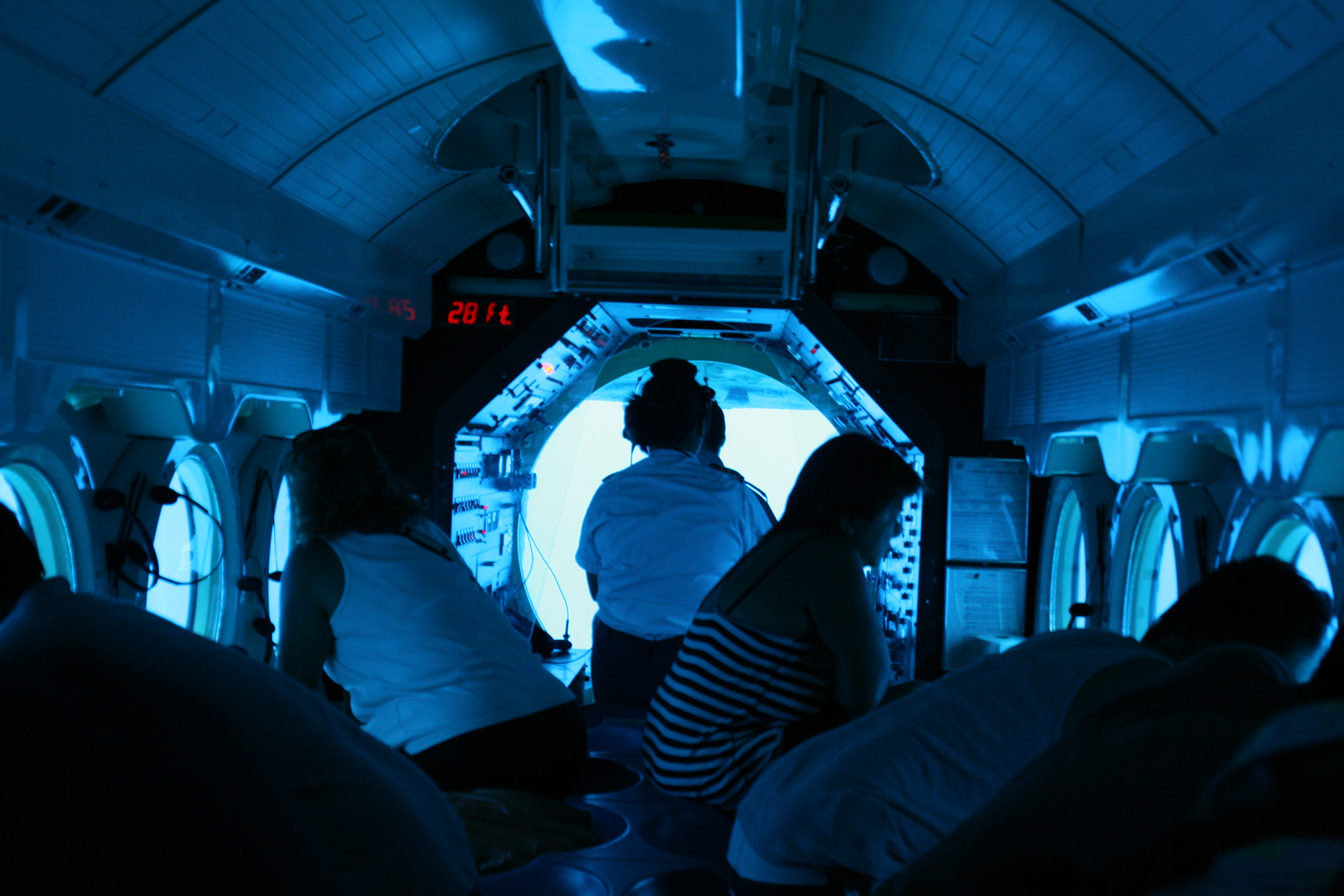
Interior of the tourist submarine Atlantis whilst submerged

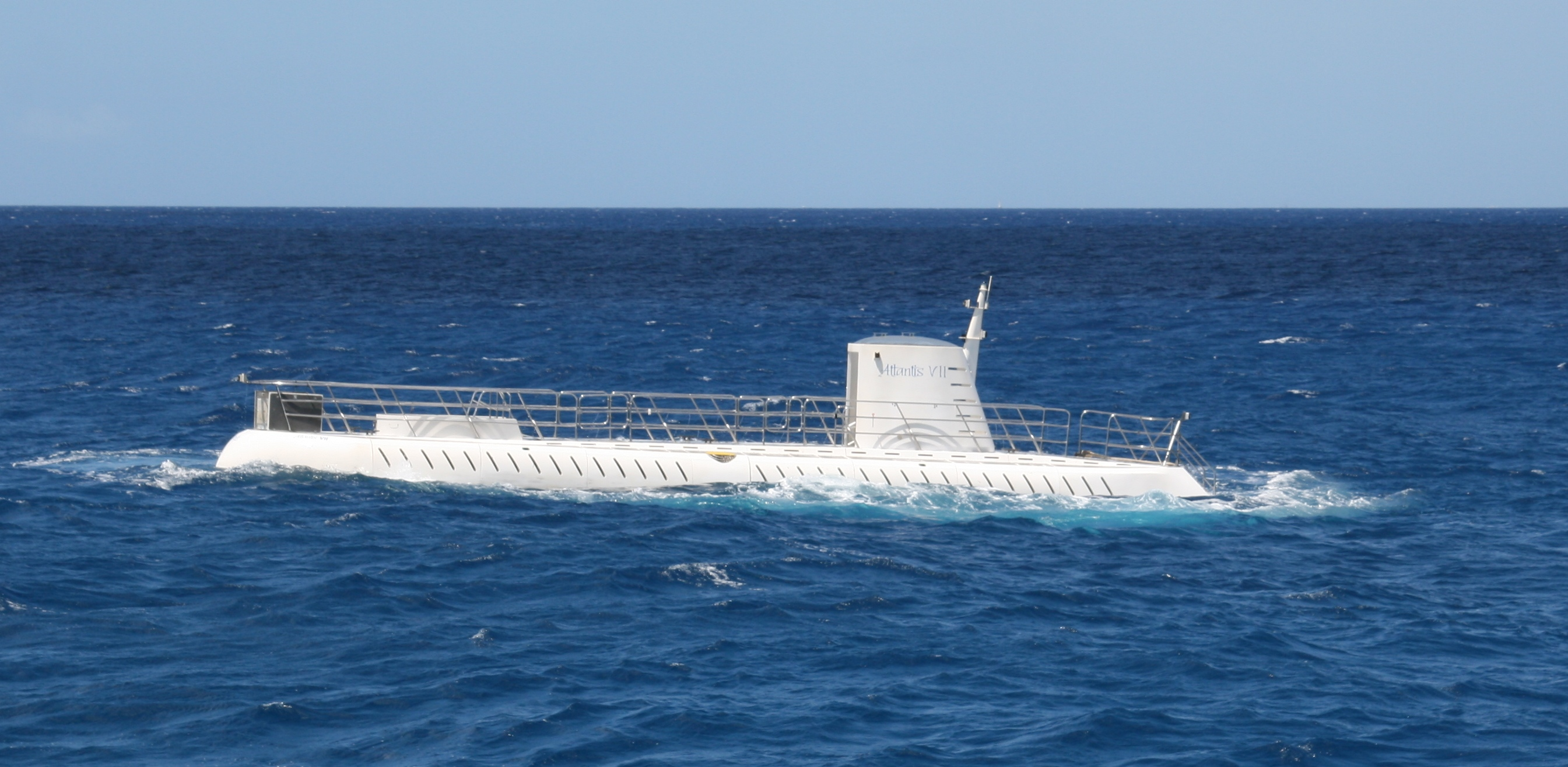
Tourist submarine Atlantis

=== Polar operations ===
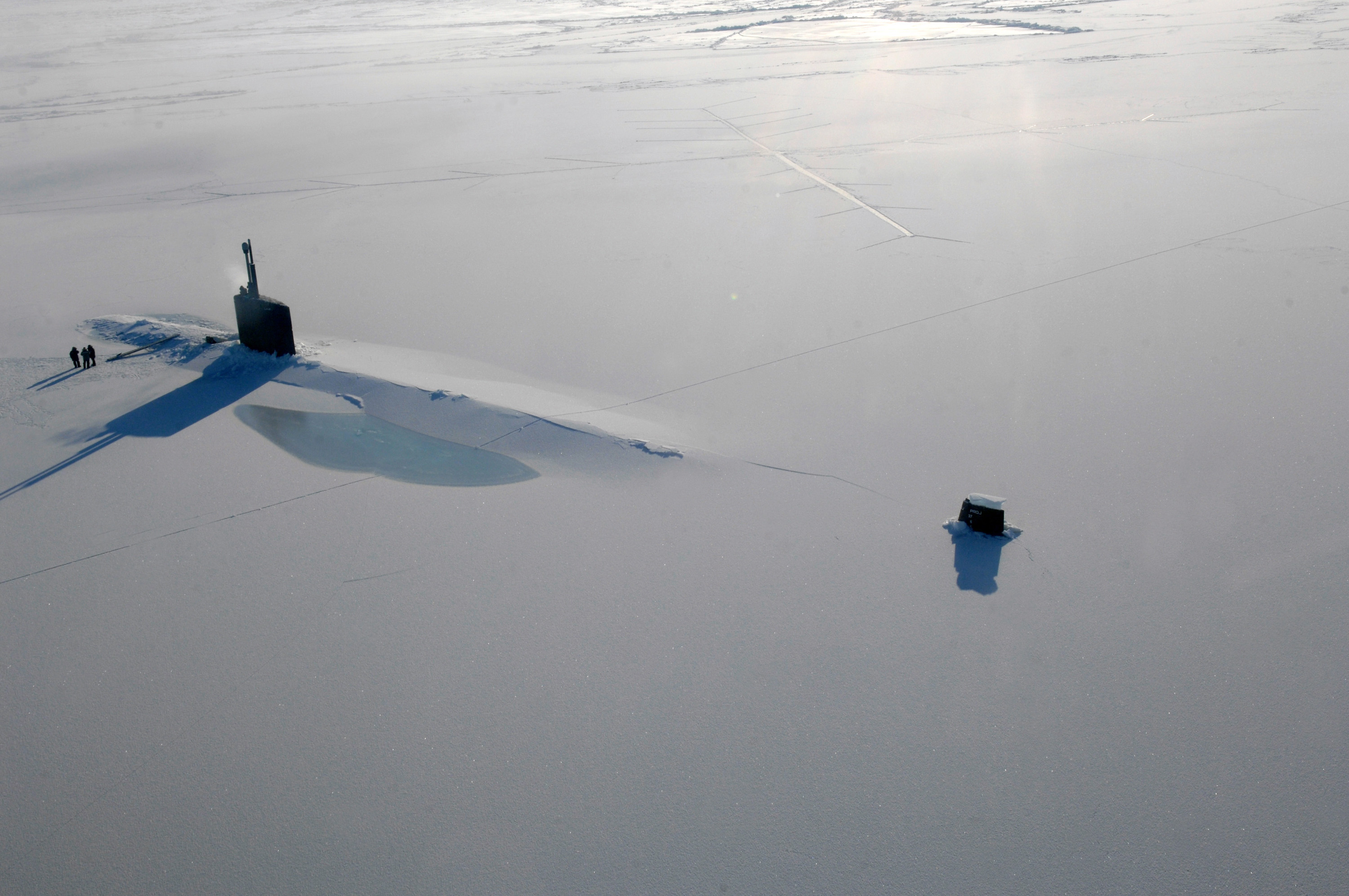
US Navy attack submarine USS Annapolis rests in the Arctic Ocean after surfacing through one metre of ice during Ice Exercise 2009 on 21 March 2009.

- 1903 – Simon Lake submarine Protector surfaced through ice off Newport, Rhode Island.
- 1930 – USS O-12 operated under ice near Spitsbergen.
- 1937 – Soviet submarine Krasnogvardeyets operated under ice in the Denmark Strait.
- 1941–45 – German U-boats operated under ice from the Barents Sea to the Laptev Sea.
- 1946 – USS Atule used upward-beamed fathometer in Operation Nanook in the Davis Strait.
- 1946–47 – USS Sennet used under-ice sonar in Operation High Jump in the Antarctic.
- 1947 – USS Boarfish used upward-beamed echo sounder under pack ice in the Chukchi Sea.
- 1948 – USS Carp developed techniques for making vertical ascents and descents through polynyas in the Chukchi Sea.
- 1952 – USS Redfish used an expanded upward-beamed sounder array in the Beaufort Sea.
- 1957 – USS Nautilus reached 87 degrees north near Spitsbergen.
- 3 August 1958 – Nautilus used an inertial navigation system to reach the North Pole.
- 17 March 1959 – USS Skate surfaced through the ice at the north pole.
- 1960 – USS Sargo transited 900 miles (1,400 km) under ice over the shallow (125 to 180 feet or 38 to 55 metres deep) Bering-Chukchi shelf.
- 1960 – USS Seadragon transited the Northwest Passage under ice.
- 1962 – Soviet November-class submarine K-3 Leninsky Komsomol reached the north pole.
- 1970 – USS Queenfish carried out an extensive undersea mapping survey of the Siberian continental shelf.
- 1971 – HMS Dreadnought reached the North Pole.
- USS Gurnard conducted three Polar Exercises: 1976 (with US actor Charlton Heston aboard); 1984 joint operations with USS Pintado; and 1990 joint exercises with USS Seahorse.
- 6 May 1986 – USS Ray, USS Archerfish and USS Hawkbill meet and surface together at the Geographic North Pole. First three-submarine surfacing at the Pole.
- 19 May 1987 – HMS Superb joined USS Billfish and USS Sea Devil at the North Pole.
- March 2007 – USS Alexandria participated in the Joint US Navy/Royal Navy Ice Exercise 2007 (ICEX-2007) in the Arctic Ocean with the Trafalgar-class submarine HMS Tireless.
- March 2009 – USS Annapolis took part in Ice Exercise 2009 to test submarine operability and war-fighting capability in Arctic conditions.

== Technology ==
=== Buoyancy and trim ===
An illustration showing submarine control surfaces and trim tanks

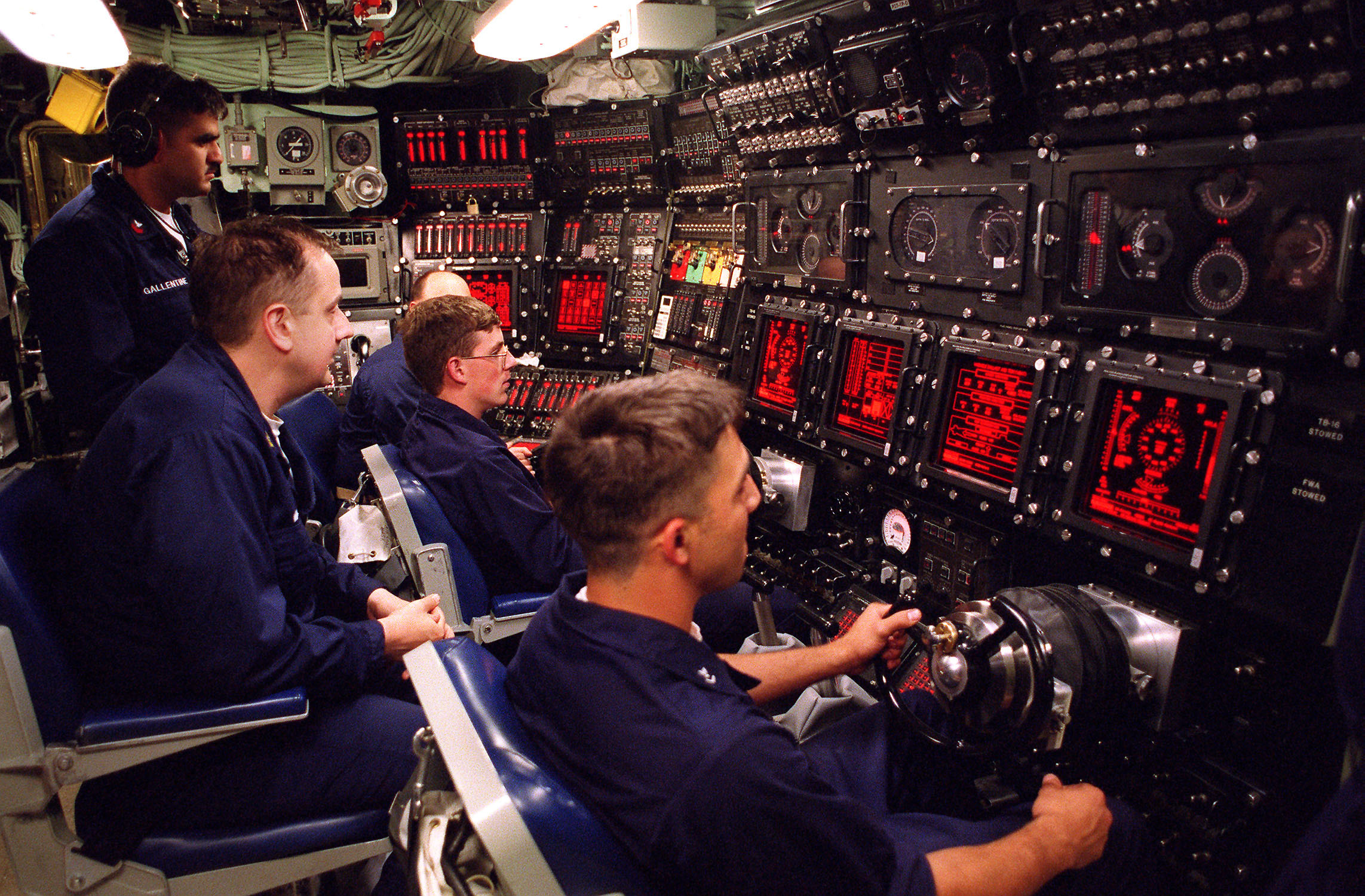
USS Seawolf (SSN-21) Ship Control Panel, with yokes for control surfaces (planes and rudder), and Ballast Control Panel (background), to control the water in tanks and ship's trim

All surface ships, as well as surfaced submarines, are in a positively buoyant condition, weighing less than the volume of water they would displace if fully submerged. To submerge hydrostatically, a ship must have negative buoyancy, either by increasing its own weight or decreasing its displacement of water. To control their displacement and weight, submarines have ballast tanks, which can hold varying amounts of water and air.

For general submersion or surfacing, submarines use the main ballast tanks (MBTs), which are ambient pressure tanks, filled with water to submerge or with air to surface. While submerged, MBTs generally remain flooded, which simplifies their design, and on many submarines, these tanks are a section of the space between the light hull and the pressure hull. For more precise control of depth, submarines use smaller depth control tanks (DCTs)—also called hard tanks (due to their ability to withstand higher pressure) or trim tanks. These are variable buoyancy pressure vessels, a type of buoyancy control device. The amount of water in depth control tanks can be adjusted to hydrostatically change depth or to maintain a constant depth as outside conditions (mainly water density) change. Depth control tanks may be located either near the submarine's center of gravity, to minimise the effect on trim, or separated along the length of the hull so they can also be used to adjust static trim by transfer of water between them.

When submerged, the water pressure on a submarine's hull can reach 4 MPa (580 psi) for steel submarines and up to 10 MPa (1,500 psi) for titanium submarines like K-278 Komsomolets, while interior pressure remains relatively unchanged. This difference results in hull compression, which decreases displacement. Water density also marginally increases with depth, as the salinity and pressure are higher. This change in density incompletely compensates for hull compression, so buoyancy decreases as depth increases. A submerged submarine is in an unstable equilibrium, having a tendency to either sink or float to the surface. Keeping a constant depth requires continual operation of either the depth control tanks or control surfaces.

Submarines in a neutral buoyancy condition are not intrinsically trim-stable. To maintain desired longitudinal trim, submarines use forward and aft trim tanks. Pumps move water between the tanks, changing weight distribution and pitching the sub up or down. A similar system may be used to maintain transverse trim.

=== Control surfaces ===
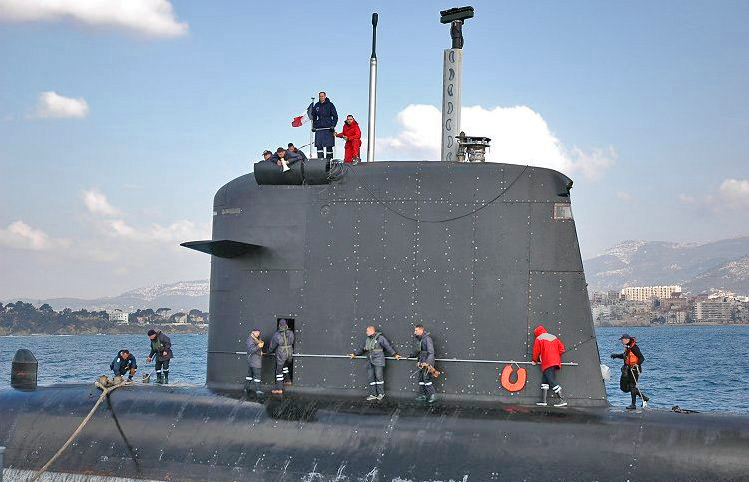
Sail of the French nuclear submarine Casabianca; note the diving planes, camouflaged masts, periscope, electronic warfare masts, hatch, and deadlight.

The hydrostatic effect of variable ballast tanks is not the only way to control the submarine underwater. Hydrodynamic maneuvering is done by several control surfaces, collectively known as diving planes or hydroplanes, which can be moved to create hydrodynamic forces when a submarine moves longitudinally at sufficient speed. In the classic cruciform stern configuration, the horizontal stern planes serve the same purpose as the trim tanks, controlling the trim. Most submarines additionally have forward horizontal planes, normally placed on the bow until the 1960s but often on the sail on later designs, where they are closer to the center of gravity and can control depth with less effect on the trim.

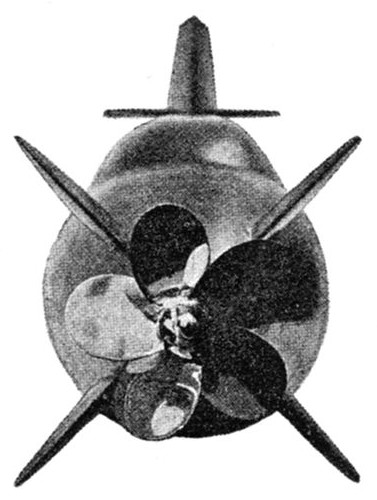
Rear view of a model of Swedish submarine HMS Sjöormen, the first production submarine to feature an x-stern

An obvious way to configure the control surfaces at the stern of a submarine is to use vertical planes to control yaw and horizontal planes to control pitch, which gives them the shape of a cross when seen from astern of the vessel. In this configuration, which long remained the dominant one, the horizontal planes are used to control the trim and depth and the vertical planes to control sideways maneuvers, like the rudder of a surface ship.

Alternatively, the rear control surfaces can be combined into what has become known as an X-stern or an X-form rudder. Although less intuitive, such a configuration has turned out to have several advantages over the traditional cruciform arrangement. First, it improves maneuverability, horizontally as well as vertically. Second, the control surfaces are less likely to get damaged when landing on, or departing from, the seabed as well as when mooring and unmooring alongside. Finally, it is safer in that one of the two diagonal lines can counteract the other with respect to vertical as well as horizontal motion if one of them accidentally gets stuck.

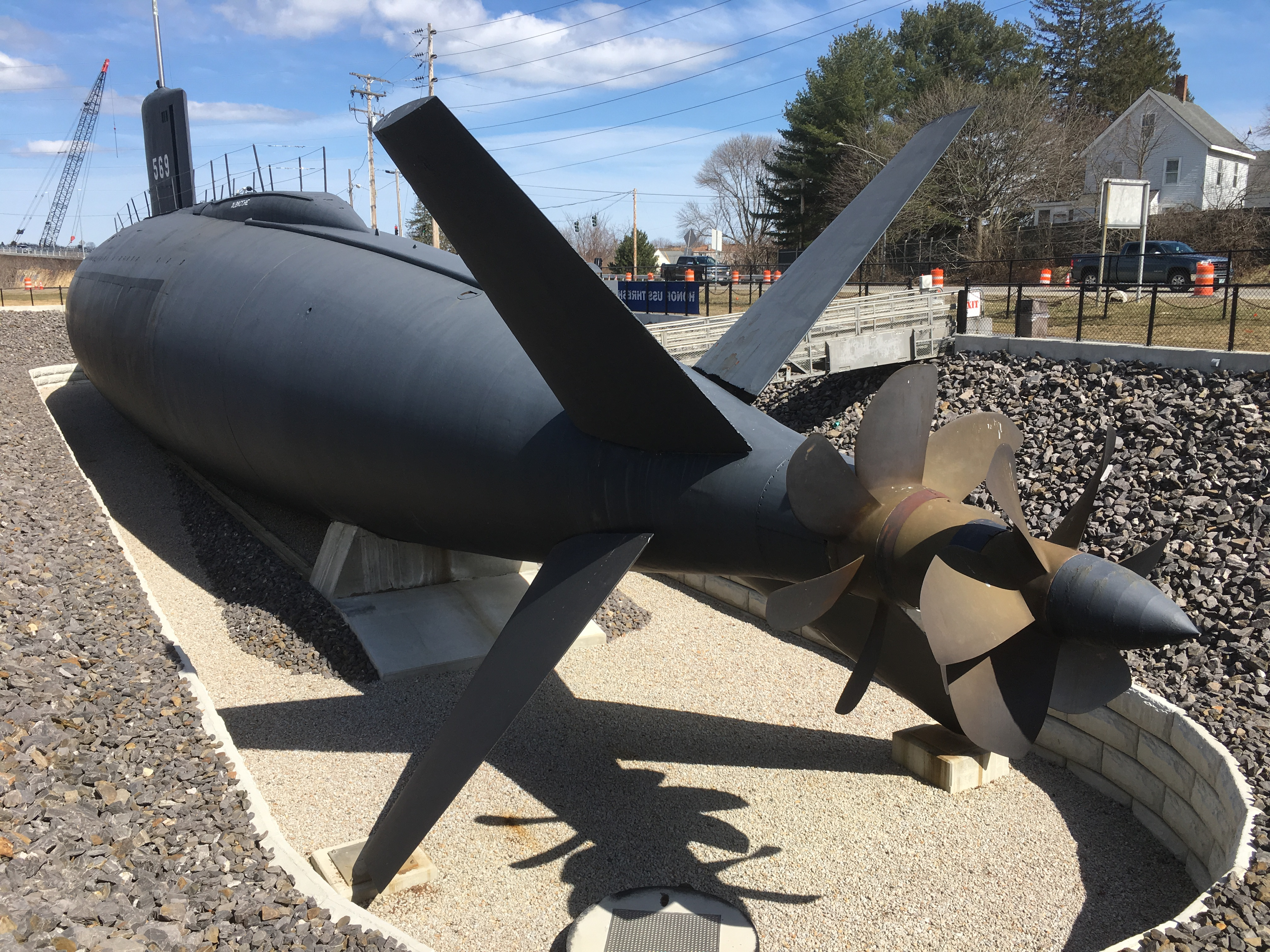
USS Albacore, the first submarine to use an x-rudder in practice, now on display in Portsmouth, New Hampshire

The x-stern was first tried in practice in the early 1960s on the USS Albacore, an experimental submarine of the US Navy. While the arrangement was found to be advantageous, it was nevertheless not used on US production submarines that followed due to the fact that it requires the use of a computer to manipulate the control surfaces to the desired effect. Instead, the first to use an x-stern in standard operations was the Swedish Navy with its Sjöormen class, the lead submarine of which was launched in 1967, before the Albacore had even finished her test runs. Since it turned out to work very well in practice, all subsequent classes of Swedish submarines (Näcken, Västergötland, Gotland, and Blekinge class) have or will come with an x-rudder.

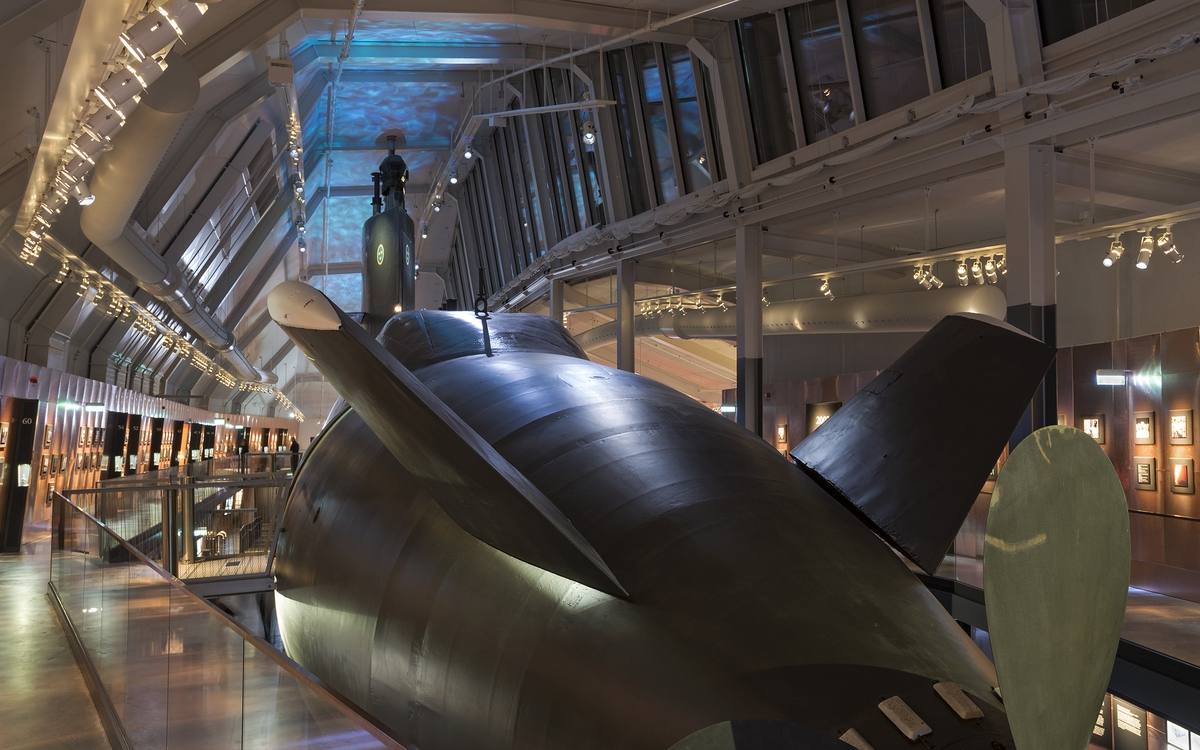
The x-rudder of HMS Neptun, a Näcken-class submarine in service with the Swedish Navy 1980–1998, now on display at Marinmuseum in Karlskrona

The Kockums shipyard responsible for the design of the x-stern on Swedish submarines eventually exported it to Australia with the Collins class as well as to Japan with the Sōryū class. With the introduction of the type 212, the German and Italian Navies came to feature it as well. The US Navy with its Columbia class, the British Navy with its Dreadnought class, and the French Navy with its Barracuda class are all about to join the x-stern family. Hence, as judged by the situation in the early 2020s, the x-stern is about to become the dominant technology.

When a submarine performs an emergency surfacing, all depth and trim control methods are used simultaneously, together with propelling the boat upwards. Such surfacing is very quick, so the vessel may even partially jump out of the water, potentially damaging submarine systems.

=== Hull ===
==== Overview ====
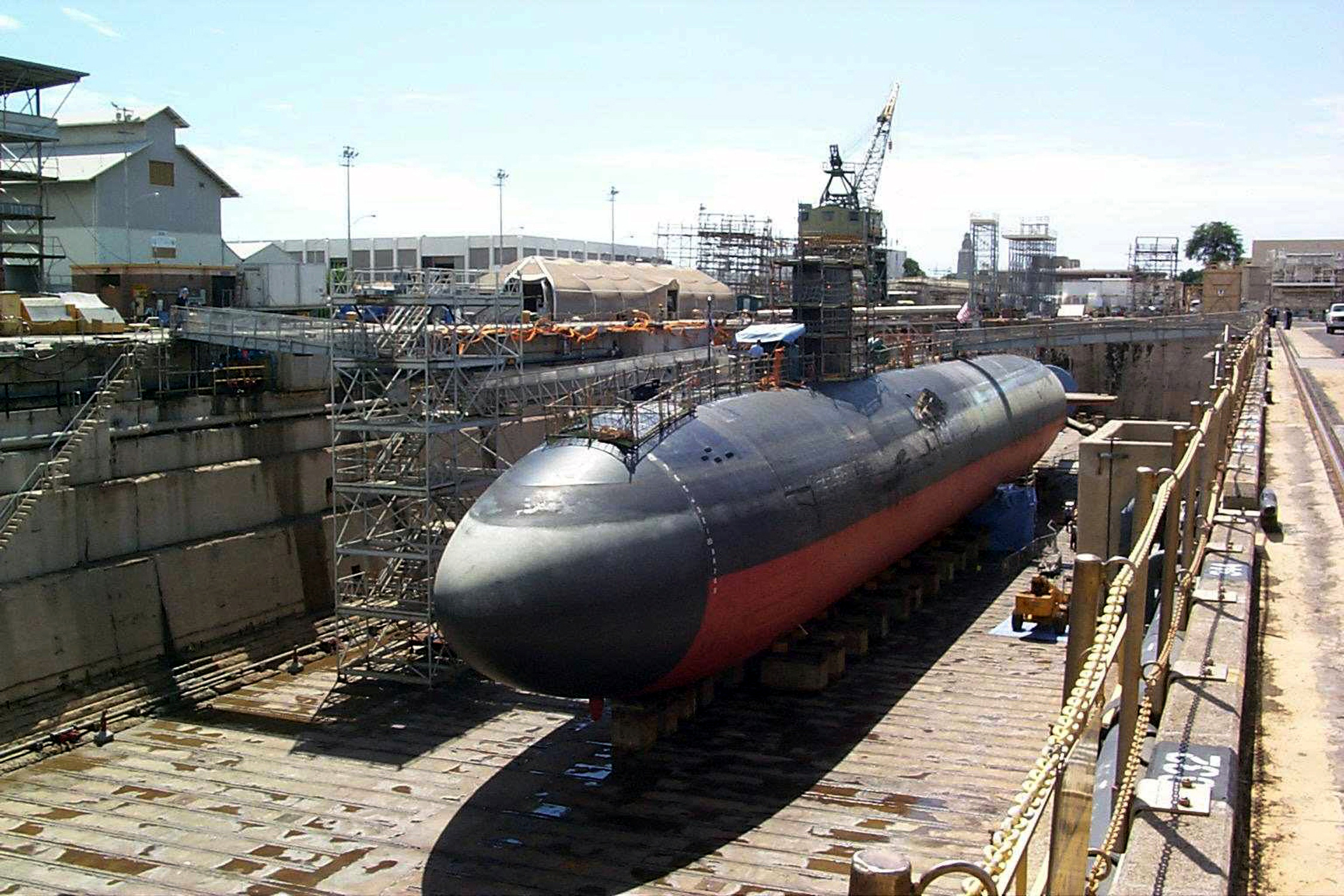
The US Navy Los Angeles-class USS Greeneville in dry dock, showing cigar-shaped hull

Modern submarines are cigar-shaped. This design, also used in very early submarines, is sometimes called a "teardrop hull". It reduces hydrodynamic drag when the sub is submerged, but decreases the sea-keeping capabilities and increases drag while surfaced. Since the limitations of the propulsion systems of early submarines forced them to operate surfaced most of the time, their hull designs were a compromise. Because of the slow submerged speeds of those subs, usually well below 10 kt (18 km/h), the increased drag for underwater travel was acceptable. Late in World War II, when technology allowed faster and longer submerged operation and increased aircraft surveillance forced submarines to stay submerged, hull designs became teardrop shaped again to reduce drag and noise. USS Albacore (AGSS-569) was a unique research submarine that pioneered the American version of the teardrop hull form (sometimes referred to as an "Albacore hull") of modern submarines. On modern military submarines the outer hull is covered with a layer of sound-absorbing rubber, or anechoic plating, to reduce detection.

The occupied pressure hulls of deep-diving submarines such as DSV Alvin are spherical instead of cylindrical. This allows a more even distribution of stress and efficient use of materials to withstand external pressure as it gives the most internal volume for structural weight and is the most efficient shape to avoid buckling instability in compression. A frame is usually affixed to the outside of the pressure hull, providing attachment for ballast and trim systems, scientific instrumentation, battery packs, syntactic flotation foam, and lighting.

A raised tower on top of a standard submarine accommodates the periscope and electronics masts, which can include radio, radar, electronic warfare, and other systems. It might also include a snorkel mast. In many early classes of submarines (see history), the control room, or "conn", was located inside this tower, which was known as the "conning tower". Since then, the conn has been located within the hull of the submarine, and the tower is now called the "sail" or "fin". The conn is distinct from the "bridge", a small open platform in the top of the sail, used for observation during surface operation.

"Bathtubs" are related to conning towers but are used on smaller submarines. The bathtub is a metal cylinder surrounding the hatch that prevents waves from breaking directly into the cabin. It is needed because surfaced submarines have limited freeboard, that is, they lie low in the water. Bathtubs help prevent swamping the vessel.

==== Single and double hulls ====
U-995, Type VIIC/41 U-boat of World War II, showing the ship-like lines of the outer hull for surface travel, blended into the cylindrical pressure hull structure

Modern submarines and submersibles usually have, as did the earliest models, a single hull. Large submarines generally have an additional hull or hull sections outside. This external hull, which actually forms the shape of submarine, is called the outer hull (casing in the Royal Navy) or light hull, as it does not have to withstand a pressure difference. Inside the outer hull there is a strong hull, or pressure hull, which withstands sea pressure and has normal atmospheric pressure inside.

As early as World War I, it was realized that the optimal shape for withstanding pressure conflicted with the optimal shape for seakeeping and minimal drag at the surface, and construction difficulties further complicated the problem. This was solved either by a compromise shape, or by using two layered hulls: the internal strength hull for withstanding pressure, and an external fairing for hydrodynamic shape. Until the end of World War II, most submarines had an additional partial casing on the top, bow and stern, built of thinner metal, which was flooded when submerged. Germany went further with the Type XXI, a general predecessor of modern submarines, in which the pressure hull was fully enclosed inside the light hull, but optimized for submerged navigation, unlike earlier designs that were optimized for surface operation.

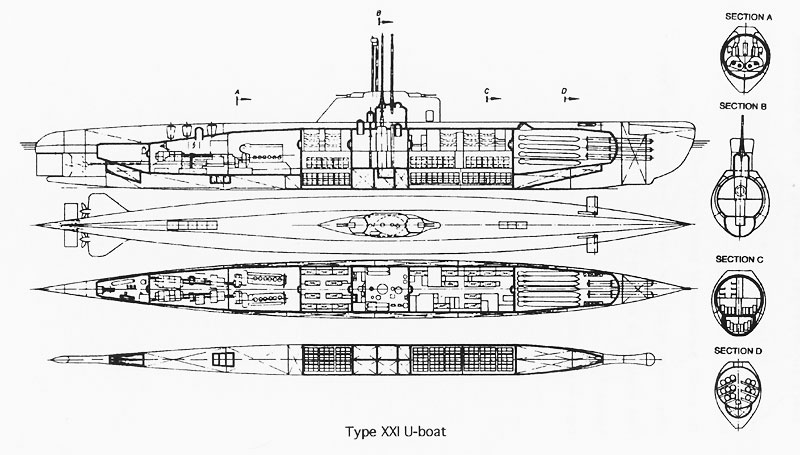
Type XXI U-boat, late World War II, with pressure hull almost fully enclosed inside the light hull

After World War II, approaches split. The Soviet Union changed its designs, basing them on German developments. All post-World War II heavy Soviet and Russian submarines are built with a double hull structure. American and most other Western submarines switched to a primarily single-hull approach. They still have light hull sections in the bow and stern, which house main ballast tanks and provide a hydrodynamically optimized shape, but the main cylindrical hull section has only a single plating layer. Double hulls are being considered for future submarines in the United States to improve payload capacity, stealth and range.

==== Pressure hull ====
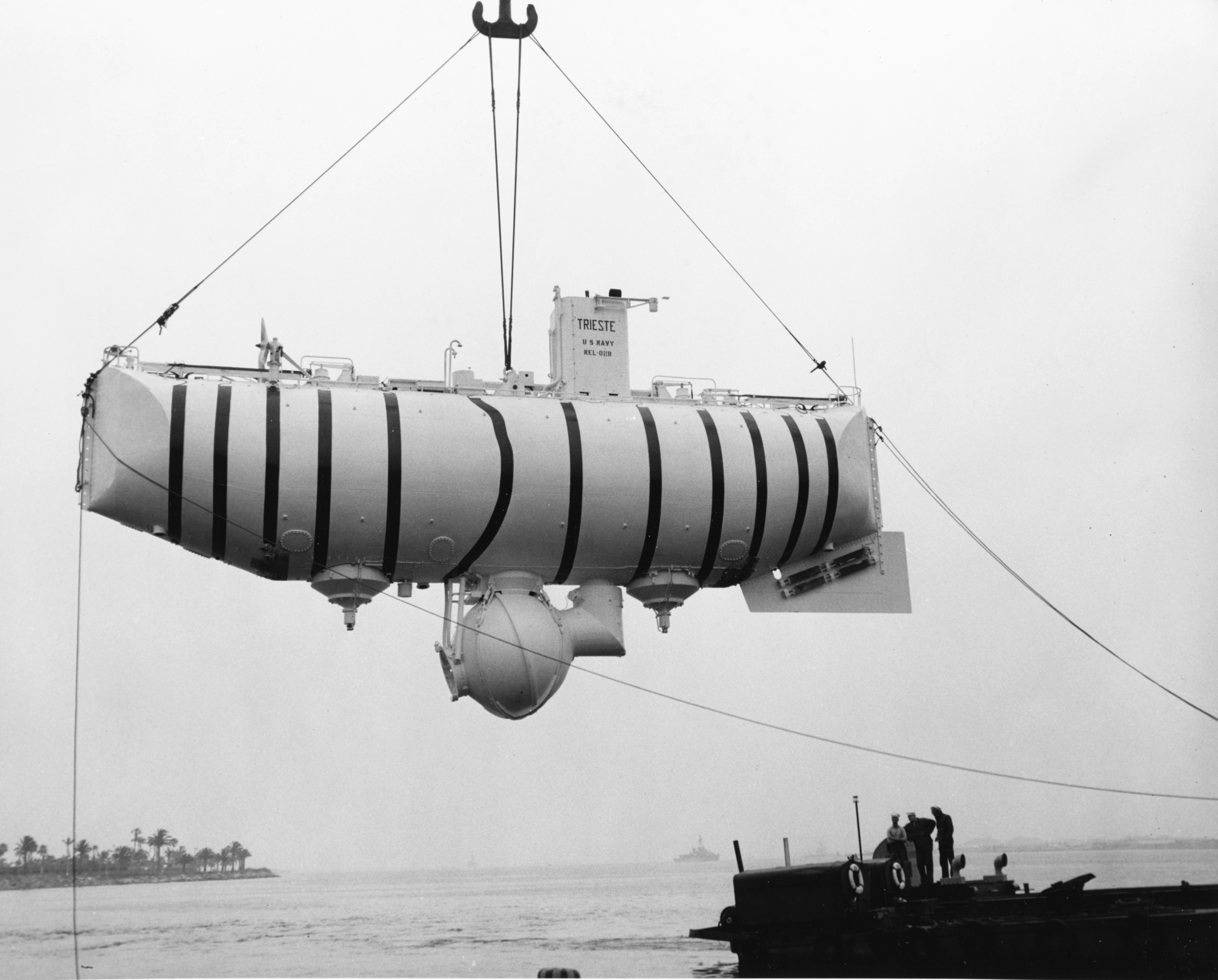
In 1960, Jacques Piccard and Don Walsh were the first people to explore the deepest part of the world's ocean, and the deepest location on the surface of the Earth's crust, in the Bathyscaphe Trieste designed by Auguste Piccard.

The pressure hull is generally constructed of thick high-strength steel with a complex structure and high strength reserve, and is separated by watertight bulkheads into several compartments. There are also examples of more than two hulls in a submarine, like the Typhoon class, which has two main pressure hulls and three smaller ones for control room, torpedoes and steering gear, with the missile launch system between the main hulls, all surrounded and supported by the outer light hydrodynamic hull. When submerged the pressure hull provides most of the buoyancy for the whole vessel.

The dive depth cannot be increased easily. Simply making the hull thicker increases the structural weight and requires reduction of onboard equipment weight, and increasing the diameter requires a proportional increase in thickness for the same material and architecture, ultimately resulting in a pressure hull that does not have sufficient buoyancy to support its own weight, as in a bathyscaphe. This is acceptable for civilian research submersibles, but not military submarines, which need to carry a large equipment, crew, and weapons load to fulfill their function. Construction materials with greater specific strength and specific modulus are needed.

WWI submarines had hulls of carbon steel, with a 100-metre (330 ft) maximum depth. During WWII, high-strength alloyed steel was introduced, allowing 200-metre (660 ft) depths. High-strength alloy steel remains the primary material for submarines today, with 250–400-metre (820–1,310 ft) depths, which cannot be exceeded on a military submarine without design compromises. To exceed that limit, a few submarines were built with titanium hulls. Titanium alloys can be stronger than steel, lighter, and most importantly, have higher immersed specific strength and specific modulus. Titanium is also not ferromagnetic, important for stealth. Titanium submarines were built by the Soviet Union, which developed specialized high-strength alloys. It has produced several types of titanium submarines. Titanium alloys allow a major increase in depth, but other systems must be redesigned to cope, so test depth was limited to 1,000 metres (3,300 ft) for the Soviet submarine K-278 Komsomolets, the deepest-diving combat submarine, though continuous operation at such depths would produce excessive stress on many submarine systems. Titanium does not flex as readily as steel, and may become brittle after many dive cycles. Despite its benefits, the high cost of titanium construction led to the abandonment of titanium submarine construction as the Cold War ended. Deep-diving civilian submarines have used thick acrylic pressure hulls. Although the specific strength and specific modulus of acrylic are not very high, the density is only 1.18g/cm^{3}, so it is only very slightly denser than water, and the buoyancy penalty of increased thickness is correspondingly low.

The deepest deep-submergence vehicle (DSV) to date is Trieste. On 5 October 1959, Trieste departed San Diego for Guam aboard the freighter Santa Maria to participate in Project Nekton, a series of very deep dives in the Mariana Trench. On 23 January 1960, Trieste reached the ocean floor in the Challenger Deep (the deepest southern part of the Mariana Trench), carrying Jacques Piccard (son of Auguste) and Lieutenant Don Walsh, USN. This was the first time a vessel, crewed or uncrewed, had reached the deepest point in the Earth's oceans. The onboard systems indicated a depth of 11,521 metres (37,799 ft), although this was later revised to 10,916 metres (35,814 ft) and more accurate measurements made in 1995 have found the Challenger Deep slightly shallower, at 10,911 metres (35,797 ft).

Building a pressure hull is difficult, as it must withstand pressures at its required diving depth. When the hull is perfectly round in cross-section, the pressure is evenly distributed, and causes only hull compression. If the shape is not perfect, the hull deflects more in some places and buckling instability is the usual failure mode. Inevitable minor deviations are resisted by stiffener rings, but even a one-inch (25 mm) deviation from roundness results in over 30 percent decrease of maximal hydrostatic load and consequently dive depth. The hull must therefore be constructed with high precision. All hull parts must be welded without defects, and all joints are checked multiple times with different methods, contributing to the high cost of modern submarines. (For example, each Virginia-class attack submarine costs US$2.6 billion, over US$200,000 per ton of displacement.)

=== Propulsion ===
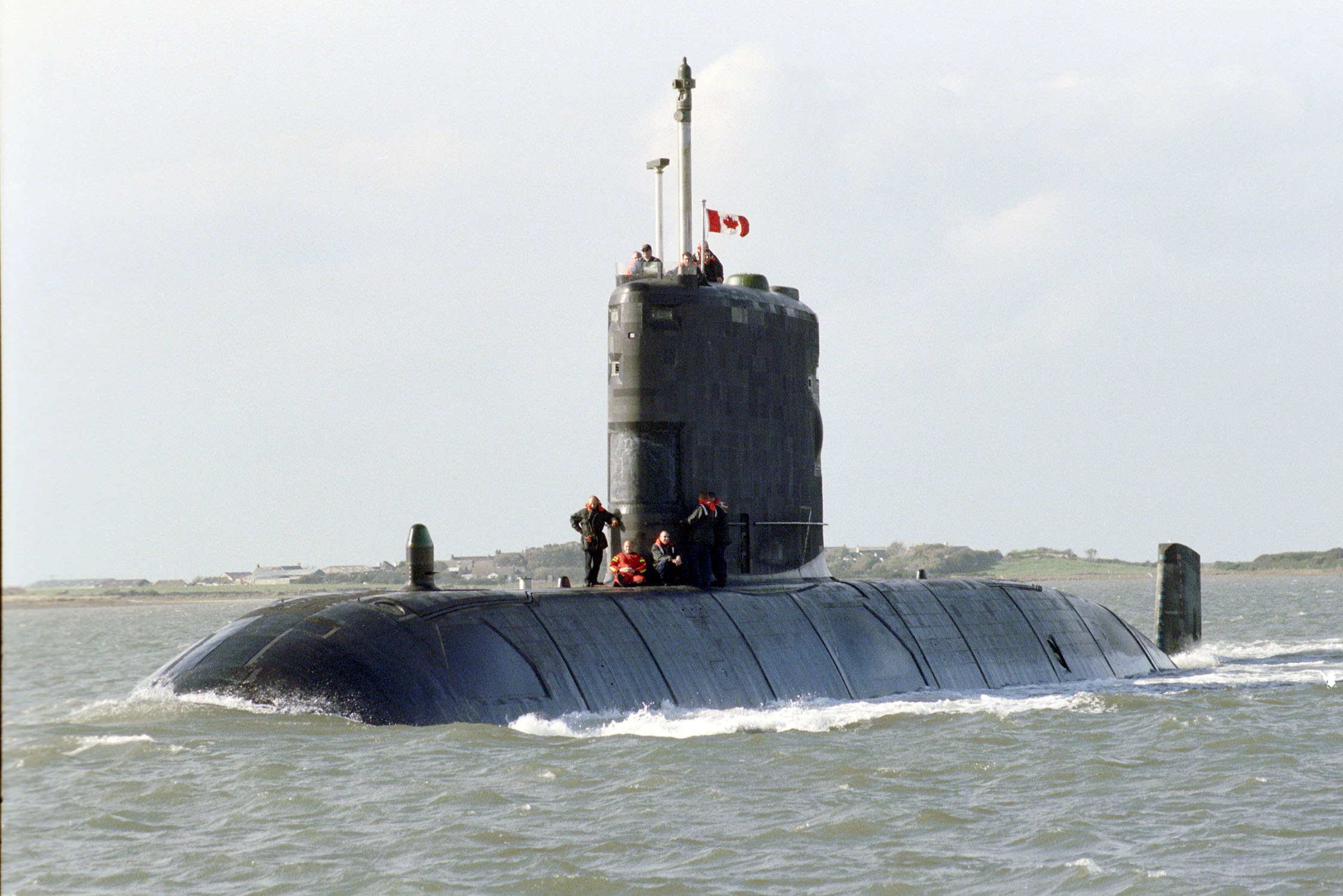
HMCS Windsor, a Royal Canadian Navy Victoria-class diesel–electric hunter-killer submarine

The first submarines were propelled by humans. The first mechanically driven submarine was the 1863 French Plongeur, which used compressed air for propulsion. Anaerobic propulsion was first employed by the Spanish Ictineo II in 1864, which used a solution of zinc, manganese dioxide, and potassium chlorate to generate sufficient heat to power a steam engine, while also providing oxygen for the crew. A similar system was not employed again until 1940 when the German Navy tested a hydrogen peroxide-based system, the Walter turbine, on the experimental V-80 submarine and later on the naval U-791 and type XVII submarines; the system was further developed for the British Explorer-class, completed in 1958.

Until the advent of nuclear marine propulsion, most 20th-century submarines used electric motors and batteries for running underwater and combustion engines on the surface, and for battery recharging. Early submarines used gasoline (petrol) engines but this quickly gave way to kerosene (paraffin) and then diesel engines because of reduced flammability and, with diesel, improved fuel-efficiency and thus also greater range. A combination of diesel and electric propulsion became the norm.

Initially, the combustion engine and the electric motor were in most cases connected to the same shaft so that both could directly drive the propeller. The combustion engine was placed at the front end of the stern section with the electric motor behind it followed by the propeller shaft. The engine was connected to the motor by a clutch and the motor in turn connected to the propeller shaft by another clutch.

With only the rear clutch engaged, the electric motor could drive the propeller, as required for fully submerged operation. With both clutches engaged, the combustion engine could drive the propeller, as was possible when operating on the surface or, at a later stage, when snorkeling. The electric motor would in this case serve as a generator to charge the batteries or, if no charging was needed, be allowed to rotate freely. With only the front clutch engaged, the combustion engine could drive the electric motor as a generator for charging the batteries without simultaneously forcing the propeller to move.

The motor could have multiple armatures on the shaft, which could be electrically coupled in series for slow speed and in parallel for high speed (these connections were called "group down" and "group up", respectively).

==== Diesel–electric transmission ====
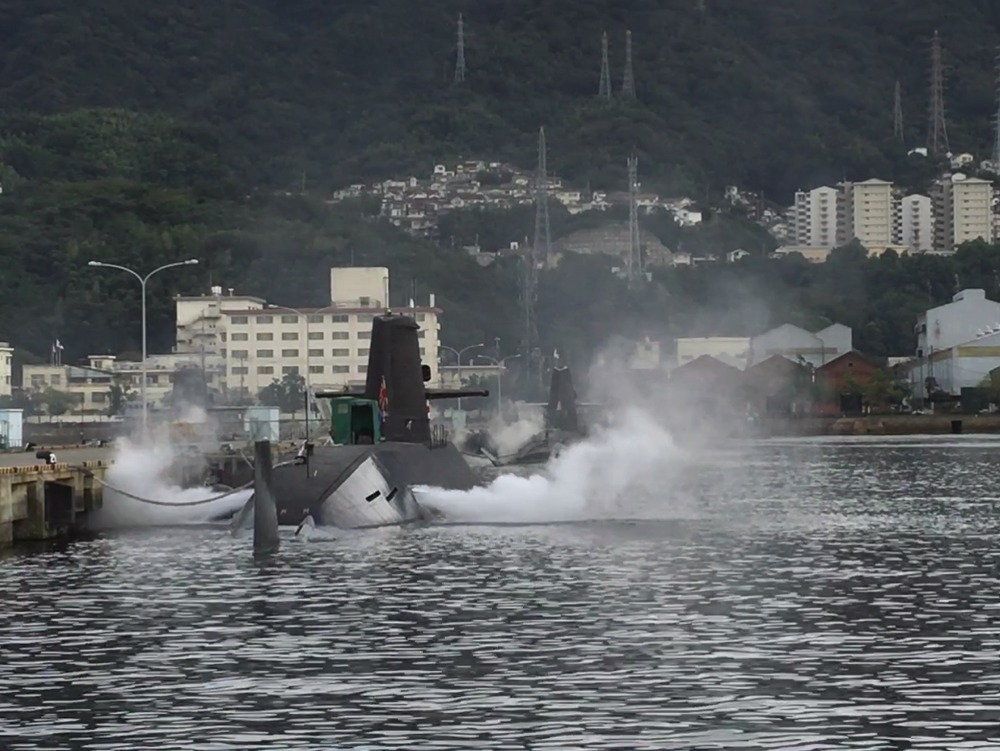
Recharging battery (JMSDF)

While most early submarines used a direct mechanical connection between the combustion engine and the propeller, an alternative solution was considered as well as implemented at a very early stage. That solution consists in first converting the work of the combustion engine into electric energy via a dedicated generator. This energy is then used to drive the propeller via the electric motor and, to the extent required, for charging the batteries. In this configuration, the electric motor is thus responsible for driving the propeller at all times, regardless of whether air is available so that the combustion engine can also be used or not.

Among the pioneers of this alternative solution was the very first submarine of the Swedish Navy, HSwMS Hajen (later renamed Ub no 1), launched in 1904. While its design was generally inspired by the first submarine commissioned by the US Navy, USS Holland, it deviated from the latter in at least three significant ways: by adding a periscope, by replacing the gasoline engine by a semidiesel engine (a hot-bulb engine primarily meant to be fueled by kerosene, later replaced by a true diesel engine) and by severing the mechanical link between the combustion engine and the propeller by instead letting the former drive a dedicated generator. By so doing, it took three significant steps toward what was eventually to become the dominant technology for conventional (i.e., non-nuclear) submarines.

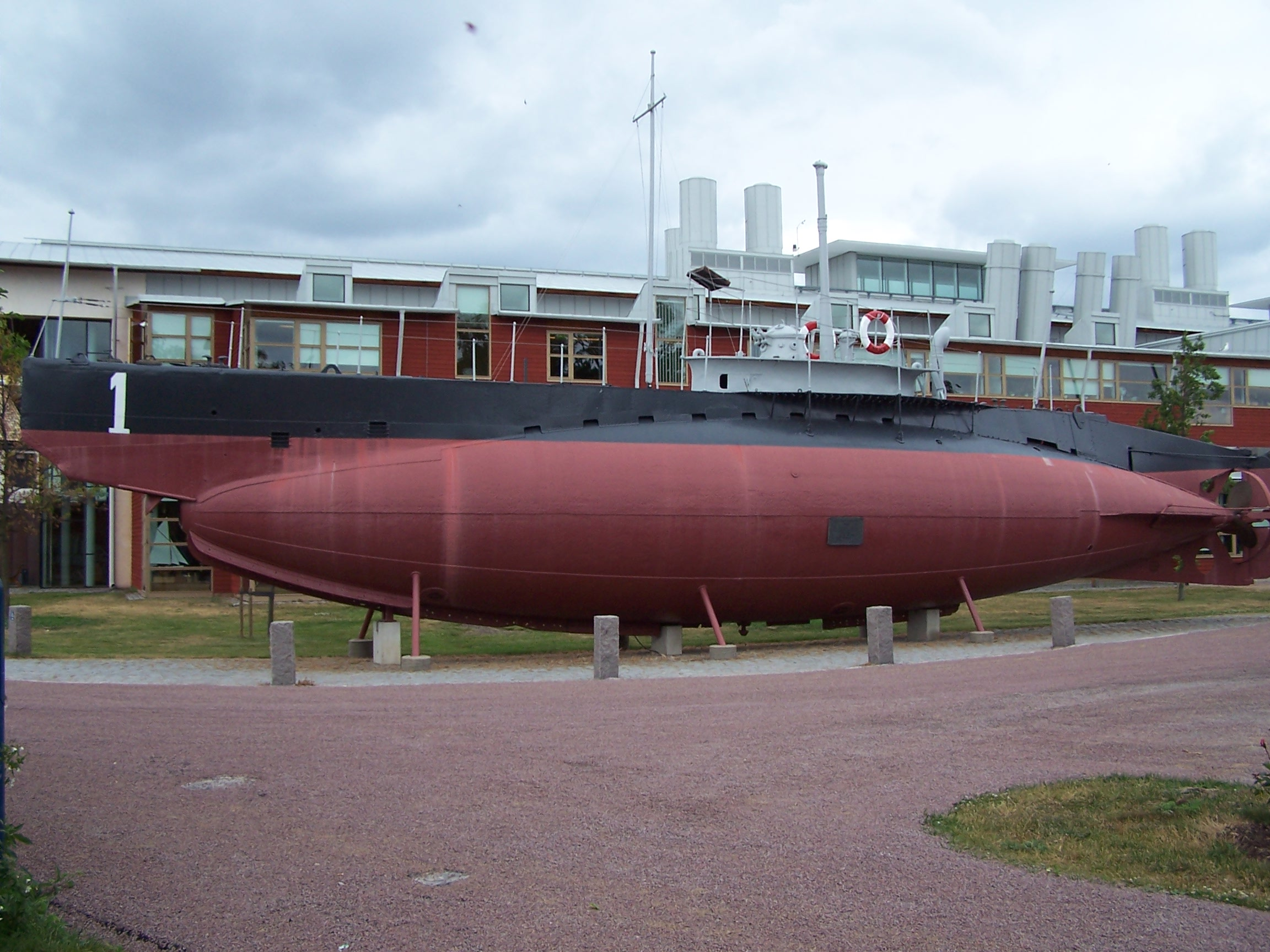
One of the first submarines with diesel–electric transmission, HMS Hajen, on display outside Marinmuseum in Karlskrona

In the following years, the Swedish Navy added another seven submarines in three different classes (Undervattensbåten No 2, Laxen, and Abborren class) using the same propulsion technology but fitted with true diesel engines rather than semidiesels from the outset. Since by that time, the technology was usually based on the diesel engine rather than some other type of combustion engine, it eventually came to be known as diesel–electric transmission.

Like many other early submarines, those initially designed in Sweden were quite small (less than 200 tonnes) and thus confined to littoral operation. When the Swedish Navy wanted to add larger vessels, capable of operating further from the shore, their designs were purchased from companies abroad that already had the required experience: first Italian (Fiat-Laurenti) and later German (A.G. Weser and IvS). As a side-effect, the diesel–electric transmission was temporarily abandoned.

However, diesel–electric transmission was immediately reintroduced when Sweden began designing its own submarines again in the mid-1930s. From that point onwards, it has been consistently used for all new classes of Swedish submarines, albeit supplemented by air-independent propulsion (AIP) as provided by Stirling engines beginning with HMS Näcken in 1988.

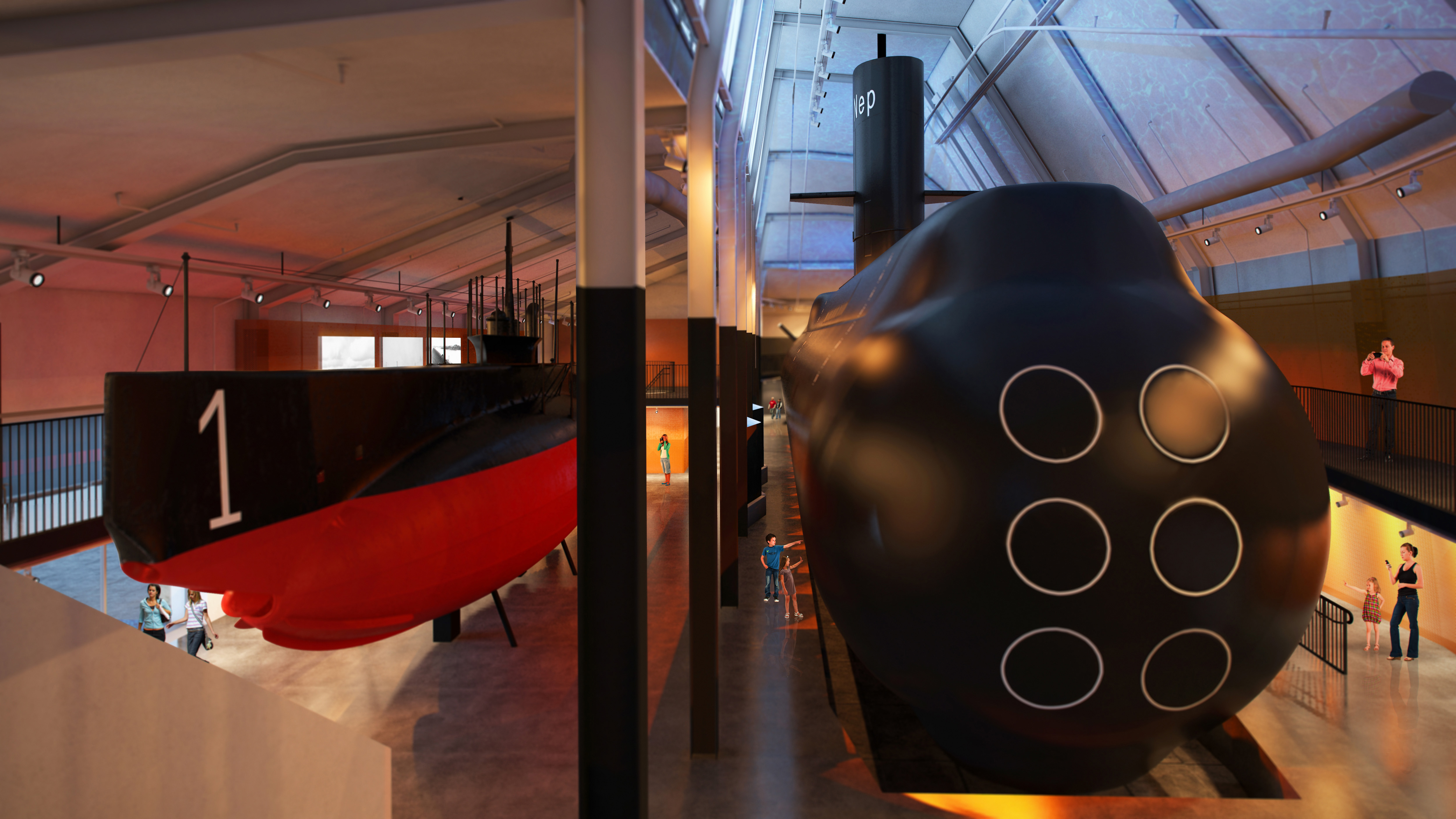
Two widely different generations of Swedish submarines but both with diesel–electric transmission: HSwMS Hajen, in service 1905–1922, and HMS Neptun, in service 1980–1998

Another early adopter of diesel–electric transmission was the US Navy, whose Bureau of Engineering proposed its use in 1928. It was subsequently tried in the S-class submarines S-3, S-6, and S-7 before being put into production with the Porpoise class of the 1930s. From that point onwards, it continued to be used on most US conventional submarines.

Apart from the British U-class and some submarines of the Imperial Japanese Navy that used separate diesel generators for low speed running, few navies other than those of Sweden and the US made much use of diesel–electric transmission before 1945. After World War II, by contrast, it gradually became the dominant mode of propulsion for conventional submarines. However, its adoption was not always swift. Notably, the Soviet Navy did not introduce diesel–electric transmission on its conventional submarines until 1980 with its Paltus class.

If diesel–electric transmission had only brought advantages and no disadvantages in comparison with a system that mechanically connects the diesel engine to the propeller, it would undoubtedly have become dominant much earlier. The disadvantages include the following:

- It entails a loss of fuel-efficiency as well as power by converting the output of the diesel engine into electricity. While both generators and electric motors are known to be very efficient, their efficiency nevertheless falls short of 100 percent.
- It requires an additional component in the form of a dedicated generator. Since the electric motor is always used to drive the propeller it can no longer step in to take on generator service as well.
- It does not allow the diesel engine and the electrical motor to join forces by simultaneously driving the propeller mechanically for maximum speed when the submarine is surfaced or snorkeling. This may, however, be of little practical importance inasmuch as the option it prevents is one that would leave the submarine at a risk of having to dive with its batteries at least partly depleted.

The reason why diesel–electric transmission has become the dominant alternative in spite of these disadvantages is of course that it also comes with many advantages and that, on balance, these have eventually been found to be more important. The advantages include the following:

- It reduces external noise by severing the direct and rigid mechanical link between the relatively noisy diesel engine(s) on the one hand and the propeller shaft(s) and hull on the other. With stealth being of paramount importance to submarines, this is a very significant advantage.
- It increases the readiness to dive, which is of course of vital importance for a submarine. The only thing required from a propulsion point of view is to shut down the diesel(s).
- It makes the speed of the diesel engine(s) temporarily independent of the speed of the submarine. This in turn often makes it possible to run the diesel(s) at close to optimal speed from a fuel-efficiency as well as durability point of view. It also makes it possible to reduce the time spent surfaced or snorkeling by running the diesel(s) at maximum speed without affecting the speed of the submarine itself.
- It eliminates the clutches otherwise required to connect the diesel engine, the electric motor, and the propeller shaft. This in turn saves space, increases reliability and reduces maintenance costs.
- It increases flexibility with regard to how the driveline components are configured, positioned, and maintained. For example, the diesel no longer has to be aligned with the electric motor and propeller shaft, two diesels can be used to power a single propeller (or vice versa), and one diesel can be turned off for maintenance as long as a second is available to provide the required amount of electricity.
- It facilitates the integration of additional primary sources of energy, beside the diesel engine(s), such as various kinds of air-independent power (AIP) systems. With one or more electric motors always driving the propeller(s), such systems can easily be introduced as yet another source of electric energy in addition to the diesel engine(s) and the batteries.

==== Snorkel ====
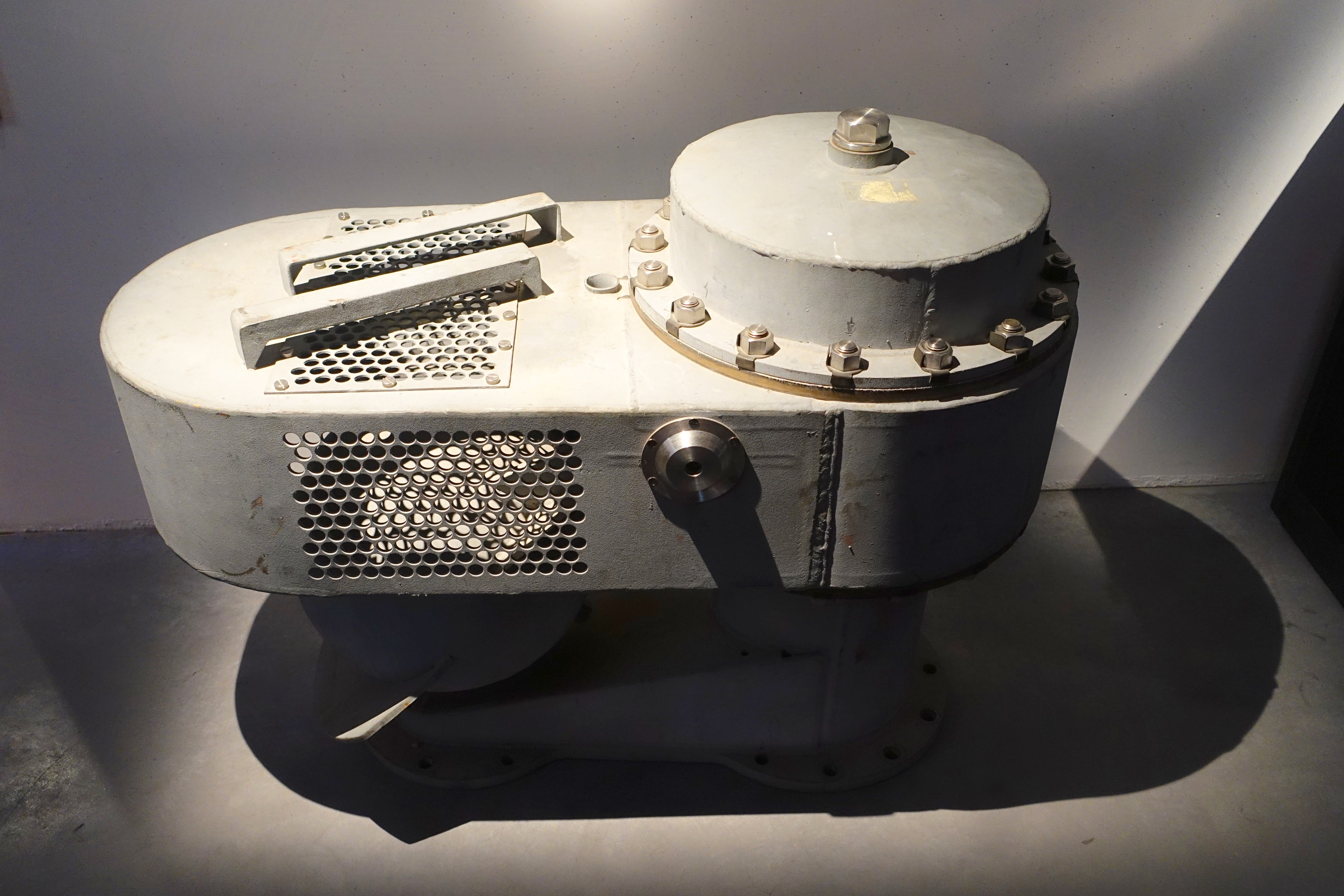
Head of the snorkel mast from German type XXI submarine U-3503, scuttled outside Gothenburg on 8 May 1945 but raised by the Swedish Navy and carefully studied for the purpose of improving future Swedish submarine designs

During World War II the Germans experimented with the idea of the schnorchel (snorkel) from captured Dutch submarines but did not see the need for them until rather late in the war. The schnorchel is a retractable pipe that supplies air to the diesel engines while submerged at periscope depth, allowing the boat to cruise and recharge its batteries while maintaining a degree of stealth.

Especially as first implemented however, it turned out to be far from a perfect solution. There were problems with the device's valve sticking shut or closing as it dunked in rough weather. Since the system used the entire pressure hull as a buffer, the diesels would instantaneously suck huge volumes of air from the boat's compartments, and the crew often suffered painful ear injuries. Speed was limited to 8 knots (15 km/h), lest the device snap from stress. The schnorchel also created noise that made the boat easier to detect with sonar, yet more difficult for the on-board sonar to detect signals from other vessels. Finally, allied radar eventually became sufficiently advanced that the schnorchel mast could be detected beyond visual range.

In clear weather, diesel exhausts can be seen on the surface to a distance of about three miles, while "periscope feather" (the wave created by the snorkel or periscope moving through the water) is visible from far off in calm sea conditions. Modern radar is also capable of detecting a snorkel in calm sea conditions.

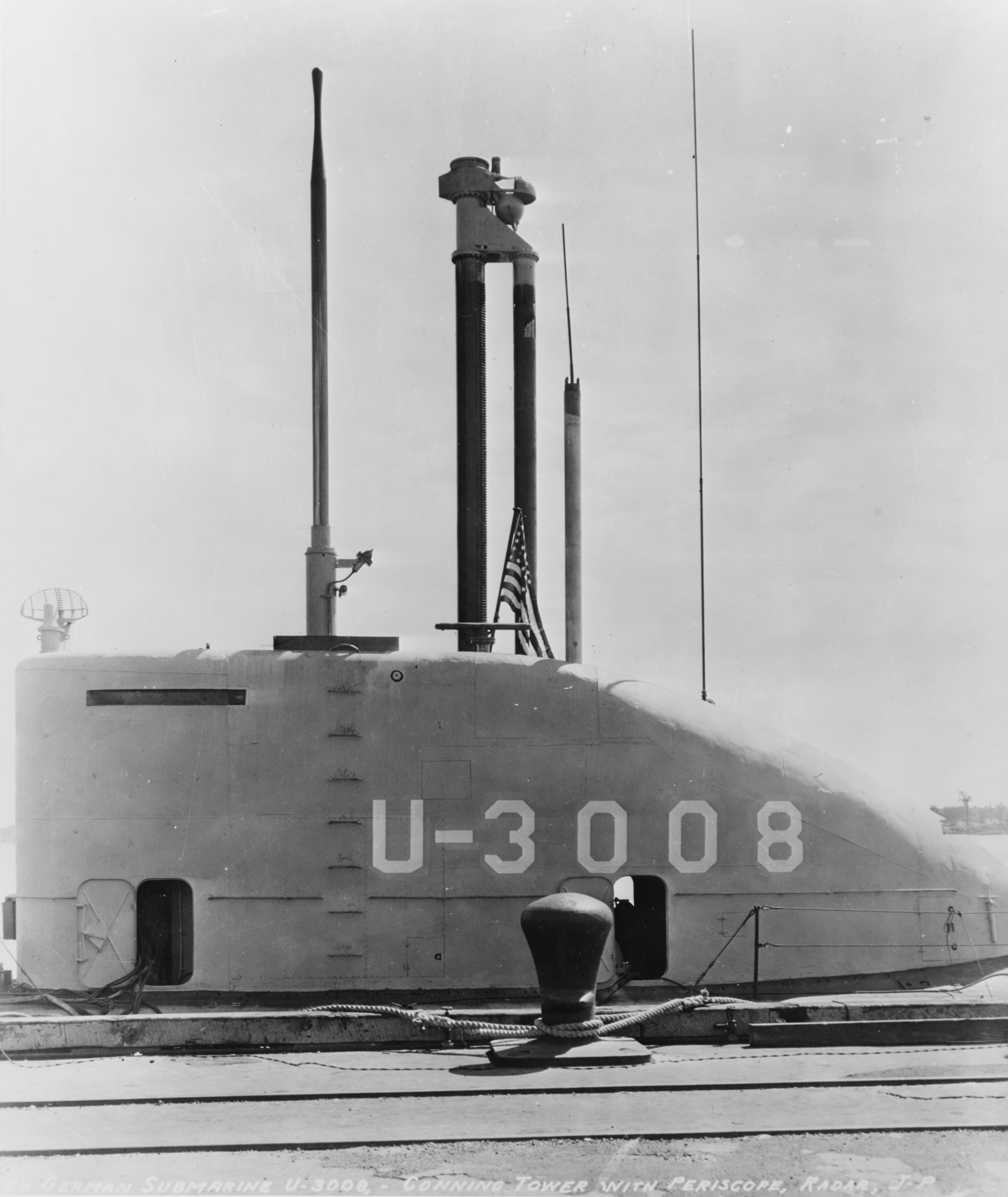
USS U-3008 (former German submarine U-3008) with her snorkel masts raised at Portsmouth Naval Shipyard, Kittery, Maine

The problem of the diesels causing a vacuum in the submarine when the head valve is submerged still exists in later model diesel submarines but is mitigated by high-vacuum cut-off sensors that shut down the engines when the vacuum in the ship reaches a pre-set point. Modern snorkel induction masts have a fail-safe design using compressed air, controlled by a simple electrical circuit, to hold the "head valve" open against the pull of a powerful spring. Seawater washing over the mast shorts out exposed electrodes on top, breaking the control, and shutting the "head valve" while it is submerged. US submarines did not adopt the use of snorkels until after WWII.

==== Air-independent propulsion ====
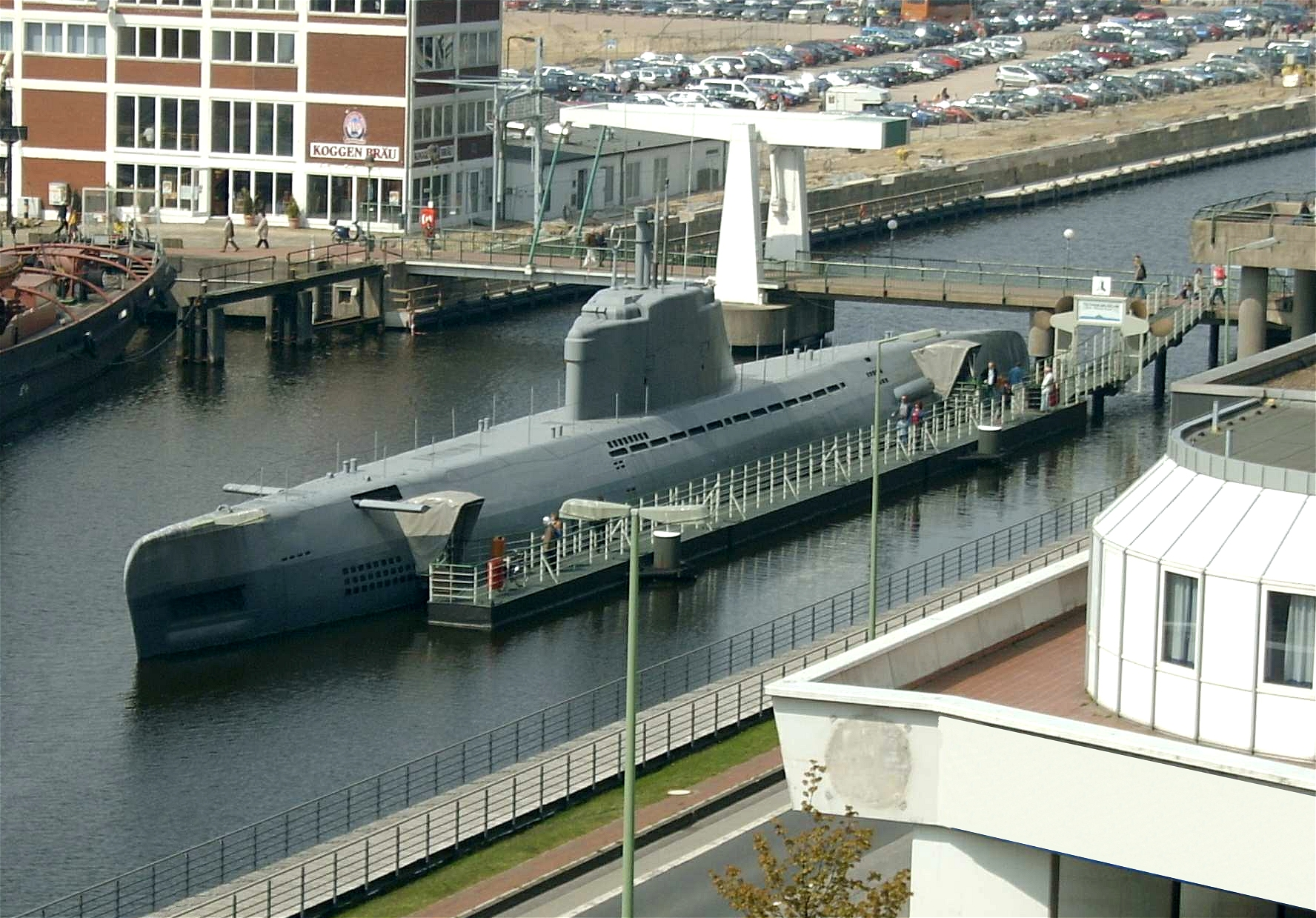
German Type XXI submarine

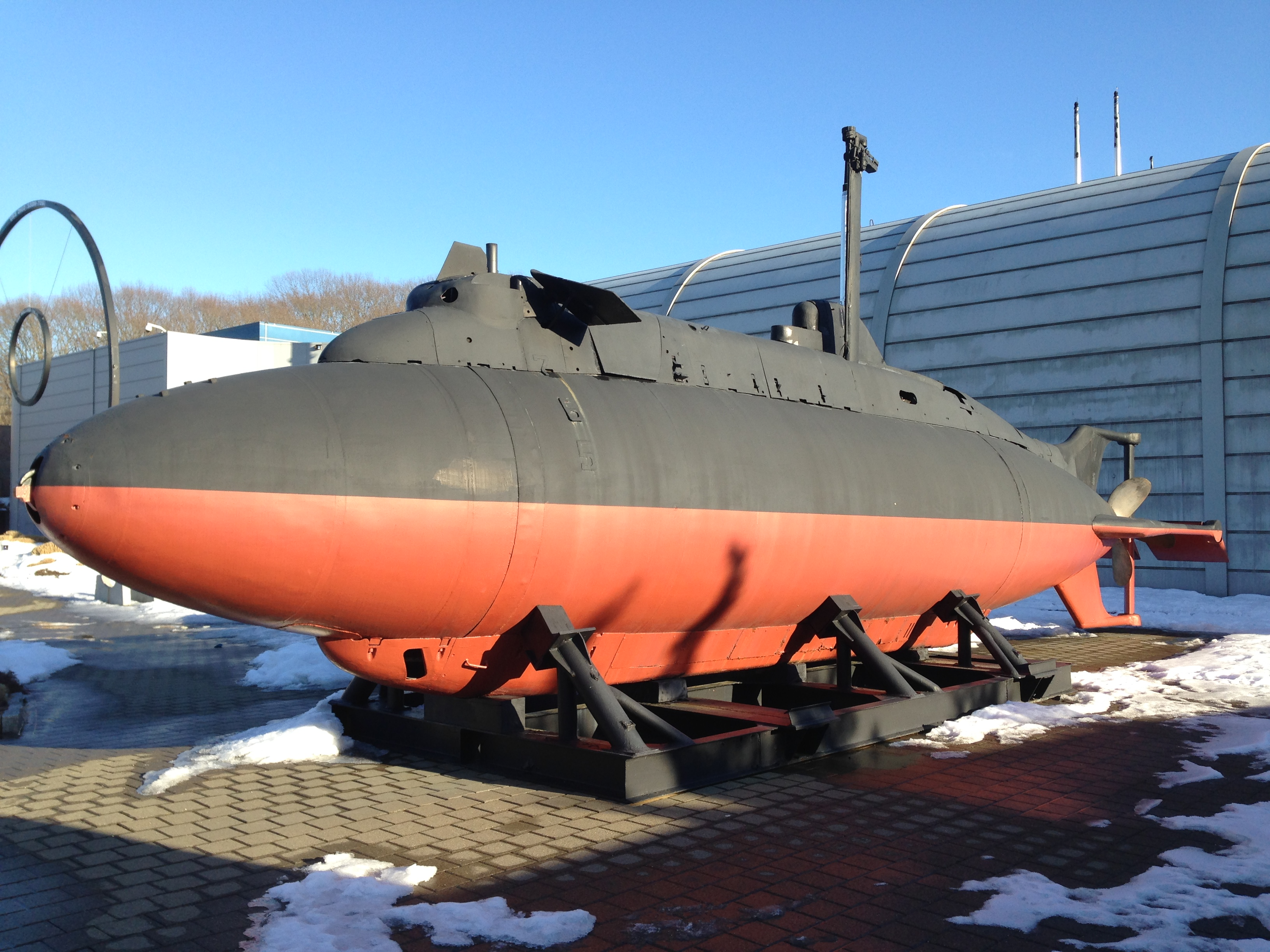
American X-1 Midget Submarine

During World War II, German Type XXI submarines (also known as "Elektroboote") were the first submarines designed to operate submerged for extended periods. Initially they were to carry hydrogen peroxide for long-term, fast air-independent propulsion, but were ultimately built with very large batteries instead. At the end of the War, the British and Soviets experimented with hydrogen peroxide/kerosene (paraffin) engines that could run surfaced and submerged. The results were not encouraging. Though the Soviet Union deployed a class of submarines with this engine type (codenamed Quebec by NATO), they were considered unsuccessful.

The United States also used hydrogen peroxide in an experimental midget submarine, X-1. It was originally powered by a hydrogen peroxide/diesel engine and battery system until an explosion of her hydrogen peroxide supply on 20 May 1957. X-1 was later converted to use diesel–electric drive.

Today several navies use air-independent propulsion. Notably Sweden uses Stirling technology on the Gotland-class and Södermanland-class submarines. The Stirling engine is heated by burning diesel fuel with liquid oxygen from cryogenic tanks. A newer development in air-independent propulsion is hydrogen fuel cells, first used on the German Type 212 submarine, with nine 34 kW or two 120 kW cells. Fuel cells are also used in the new Spanish S-80-class submarines although with the fuel stored as ethanol and then converted into hydrogen before use.

==== Nuclear power ====
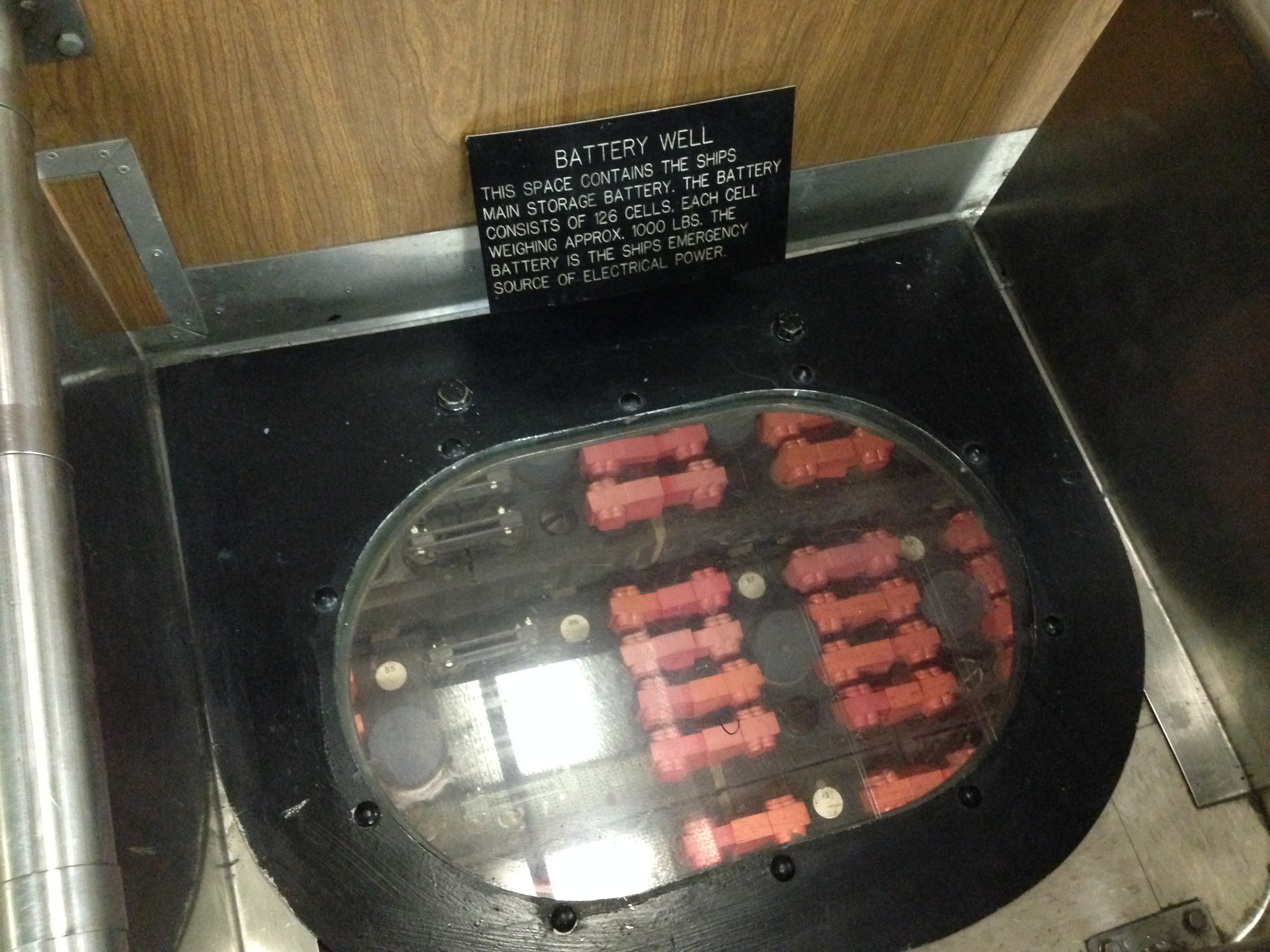
Battery well containing 126 cells on USS Nautilus, the first nuclear-powered submarine

Steam power was resurrected in the 1950s with a nuclear-powered steam turbine driving a generator. By eliminating the need for atmospheric oxygen, the time that a submarine could remain submerged was limited only by its food stores, as breathing air was recycled and fresh water distilled from seawater. More importantly, a nuclear submarine has unlimited range at top speed. This allows it to travel from its operating base to the combat zone in a much shorter time and makes it a far more difficult target for most anti-submarine weapons. Nuclear-powered submarines have a relatively small battery and diesel engine/generator powerplant for emergency use if the reactors must be shut down.

Nuclear power is now used in all large submarines, but due to the high cost and large size of nuclear reactors, smaller submarines still use diesel–electric propulsion. The ratio of larger to smaller submarines depends on strategic needs. The US Navy, French Navy, and the British Royal Navy operate only nuclear submarines, which is explained by the need for distant operations. Other major operators rely on a mix of nuclear submarines for strategic purposes and diesel–electric submarines for defense. Most fleets have no nuclear submarines, due to the limited availability of nuclear power and submarine technology.

Diesel–electric submarines have a stealth advantage over their nuclear counterparts. Nuclear submarines generate noise from coolant pumps and turbo-machinery needed to operate the reactor, even at low power levels. Some nuclear submarines such as the American Ohio class can operate with their reactor coolant pumps secured, making them quieter than electric subs. A conventional submarine operating on batteries is almost completely silent, the only noise coming from the shaft bearings, propeller, and flow noise around the hull, all of which stops when the sub hovers in mid-water to listen, leaving only the noise from crew activity. Commercial submarines usually rely only on batteries, since they operate in conjunction with a mother ship.

Several serious nuclear and radiation accidents have involved nuclear submarine mishaps. The Soviet submarine K-19 reactor accident in 1961 resulted in 8 deaths and more than 30 other people were over-exposed to radiation. The Soviet submarine K-27 reactor accident in 1968 resulted in 9 fatalities and 83 other injuries. The Soviet submarine K-431 accident in 1985 resulted in 10 fatalities and 49 other radiation injuries.

==== Alternative ====
Oil-fired steam turbines powered the British K-class submarines, built during World War I and later, to give them the surface speed to keep up with the battle fleet. The K-class subs were not very successful, however.

Toward the end of the 20th century, some submarines—such as the British Vanguard class—began to be fitted with pump-jet propulsors instead of propellers. Though these are heavier, more expensive, and less efficient than a propeller, they are significantly quieter, providing an important tactical advantage.

=== Armament ===
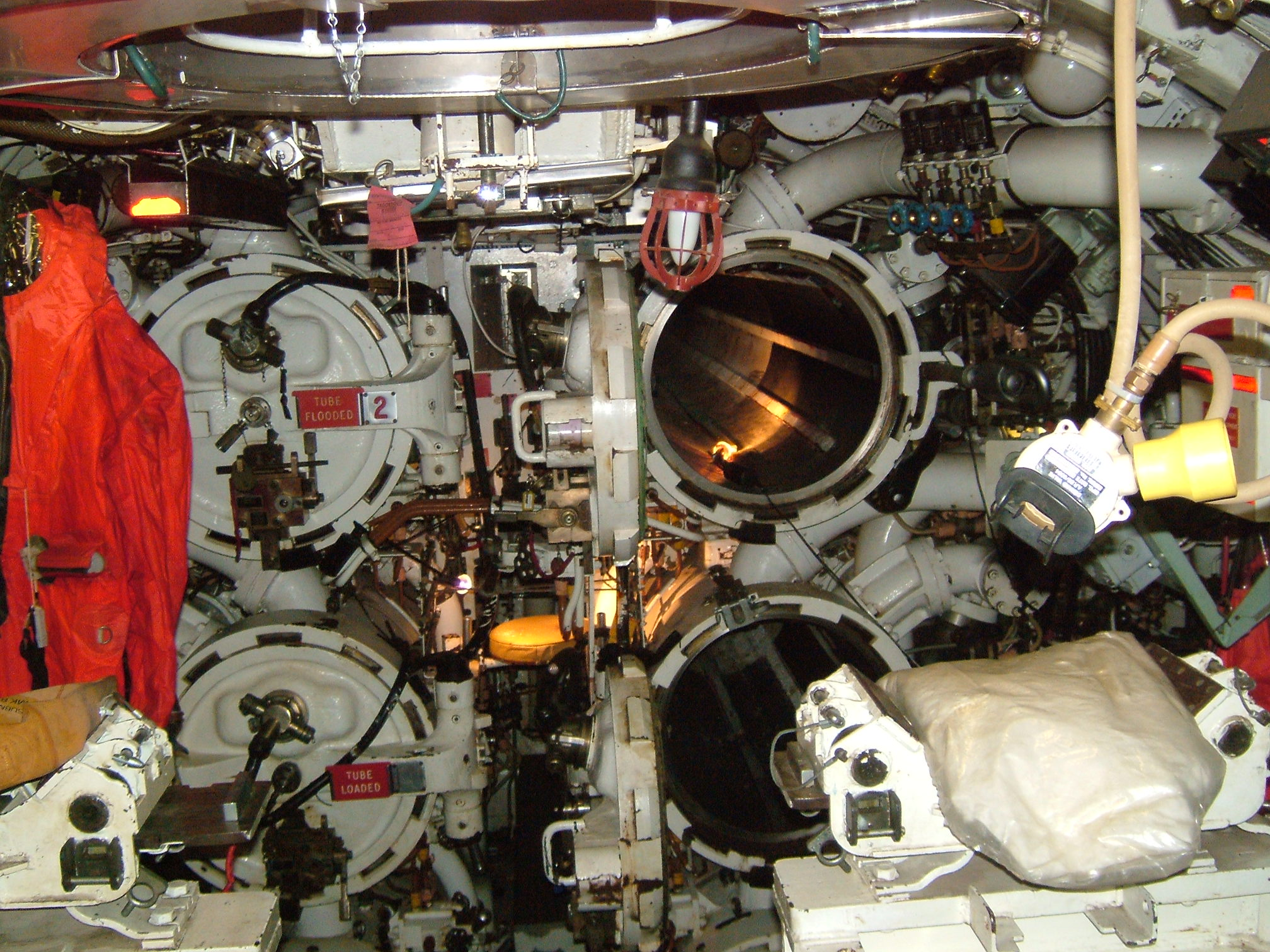
The forward torpedo tubes in HMS Ocelot

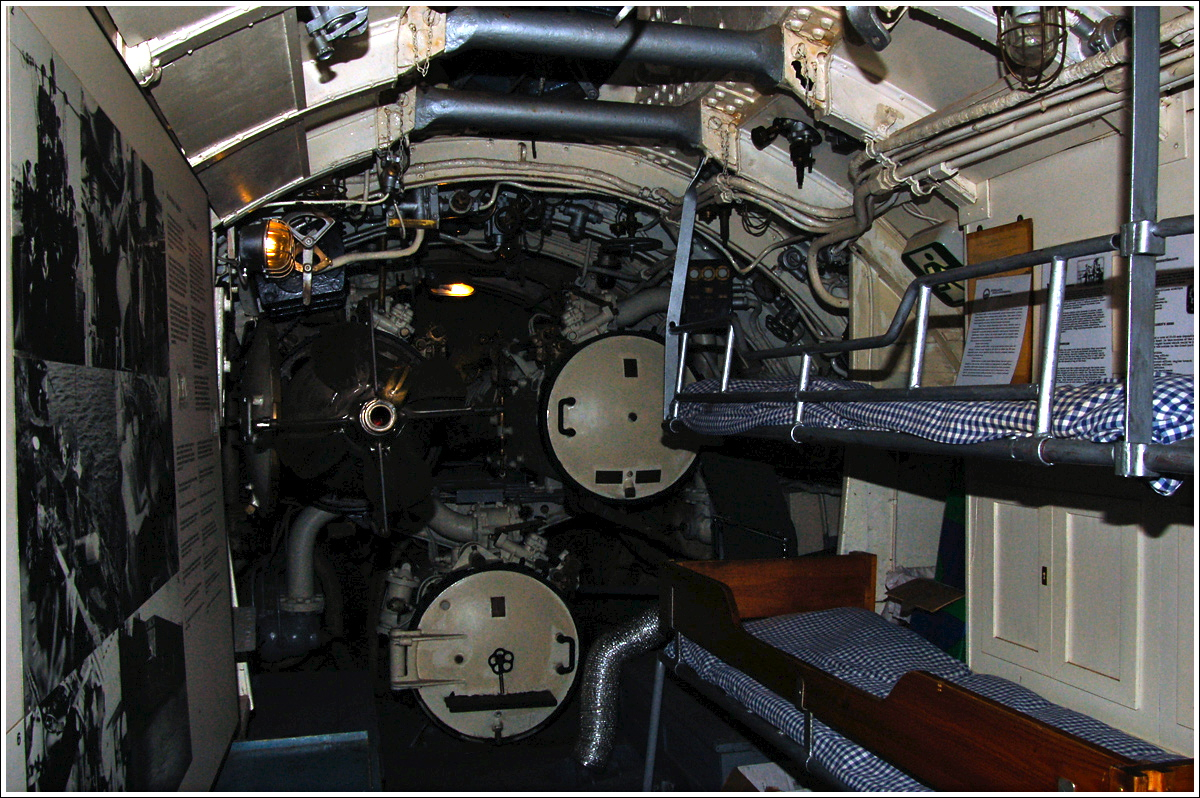
The torpedo room of Vesikko

The success of the submarine is inextricably linked to the development of the torpedo, invented by Robert Whitehead in 1866. His invention (essentially the same now as it was 140 years ago), allowed the submarine make the leap from novelty to a weapon of war. Prior to the development and miniaturization of sonar sensitive enough to track a submerged submarine, attacks were exclusively restricted to ships and submarines operating near or at the surface. Targeting of unguided torpedoes was initially done by eye, but by World War II analog targeting computers began to proliferate, being able to calculate basic firing solutions. Nonetheless, multiple "straight-running" torpedoes could be required to ensure a target was hit. With at most 20 to 25 torpedoes stored on board, the number of attacks a submarine could make was limited. To increase combat endurance starting in World War I submarines also functioned as submersible gunboats, using their deck guns against unarmed targets, and diving to escape and engage enemy warships. The initial importance of these deck guns encouraged the development of the unsuccessful Submarine Cruiser such as the French Surcouf and the Royal Navy's X1 and M-class submarines. With the arrival of anti-submarine warfare (ASW) aircraft, guns became more for defense than attack. A more practical method of increasing combat endurance was the external torpedo tube, loaded only in port.

The ability of submarines to approach enemy harbours covertly led to their use as minelayers. Minelaying submarines of World War I and World War II were specially built for that purpose. Modern submarine-laid mines, such as the British Mark 5 Stonefish and Mark 6 Sea Urchin, can be deployed from a submarine's torpedo tubes.

After World War II, both the US and the USSR experimented with submarine-launched cruise missiles such as the SSM-N-8 Regulus and P-5 Pyatyorka. Such missiles required the submarine to surface to fire its missiles. They were the forerunners of modern submarine-launched cruise missiles, which can be fired from the torpedo tubes of submerged submarines, for example, the US BGM-109 Tomahawk and Russian RPK-2 Viyuga and versions of surface-to-surface anti-ship missiles such as the Exocet and Harpoon, encapsulated for submarine launch. Ballistic missiles can also be fired from a submarine's torpedo tubes, for example, missiles such as the anti-submarine SUBROC. With internal volume as limited as ever and the desire to carry heavier warloads, the idea of the external launch tube was revived, usually for encapsulated missiles, with such tubes being placed between the internal pressure and outer streamlined hulls. Guided torpedoes also proliferated extensively during and after World War II, even further increasing the combat endurance and lethality of submarines and allowing them to engage other submarines at depth (with the latter now being one of the primary missions of the modern attack submarine).

The strategic mission of the SSM-N-8 and the P-5 was taken up by submarine-launched ballistic missile beginning with the US Navy's Polaris missile, and subsequently the Poseidon and Trident missiles.

Germany is working on the torpedo tube-launched short-range IDAS missile, which can be used against ASW helicopters, as well as surface ships and coastal targets.

=== Sensors ===
A submarine can have a variety of sensors, depending on its missions. Modern military submarines rely almost entirely on a suite of passive and active sonars to locate targets. Active sonar relies on an audible "ping" to generate echoes to reveal objects around the submarine. Active systems are rarely used, as doing so reveals the sub's presence. Passive sonar is a set of sensitive hydrophones set into the hull or trailed in a towed array, normally trailing several hundred feet behind the sub. The towed array is the mainstay of NATO submarine detection systems, as it reduces the flow noise heard by operators. Hull mounted sonar is employed in addition to the towed array, as the towed array can not work in shallow depth and during maneuvering. In addition, sonar has a blind spot "through" the submarine, so a system on both the front and back works to eliminate that problem. As the towed array trails behind and below the submarine, it also allows the submarine to have a system both above and below the thermocline at the proper depth; sound passing through the thermocline is distorted resulting in a lower detection range. Global climate change and warmer oceans may complicate detecting submarines at depth in most places in the world.

Submarines also carry radar equipment to detect surface ships and aircraft. Submarine captains are more likely to use radar detection gear than active radar to detect targets, as radar can be detected far beyond its own return range, revealing the submarine. Periscopes are rarely used, except for position fixes and to verify a contact's identity.

Civilian submarines, such as the DSV Alvin or the Russian Mir submersibles, rely on small active sonar sets and viewing ports to navigate. The human eye cannot detect sunlight below about 300 feet (91 m) underwater, so high intensity lights are used to illuminate the viewing area.

=== Navigation ===
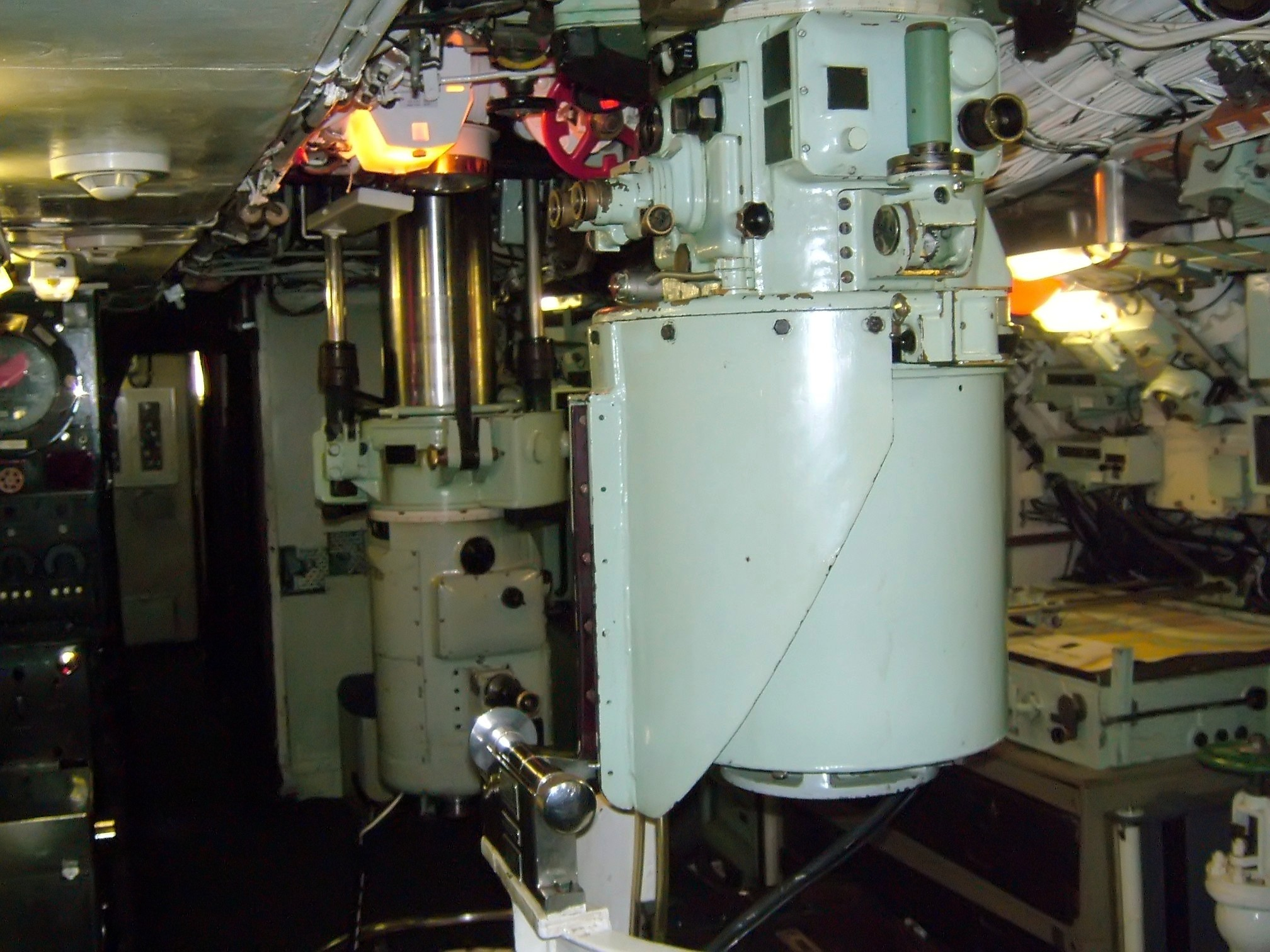
The larger search periscope, and the smaller, less detectable attack periscope on HMS Ocelot

Early submarines had few navigation aids, but modern subs have a variety of navigation systems. Modern military submarines use an inertial guidance system for navigation while submerged, but drift error unavoidably builds over time. To counter this, the crew occasionally uses the Global Positioning System to obtain an accurate position. The periscope—a retractable tube with a prism system that provides a view of the surface—is only used occasionally in modern submarines, since the visibility range is short. The Virginia-class and Astute-class submarines use photonics masts rather than hull-penetrating optical periscopes. These masts must still be deployed above the surface, and use electronic sensors for visible light, infrared, laser range-finding, and electromagnetic surveillance. One benefit to hoisting the mast above the surface is that while the mast is above the water the entire sub is still below the water and is much harder to detect visually or by radar.

=== Communication ===
Military submarines use several systems to communicate with distant command centers or other ships. One is VLF (very low frequency) radio, which can reach a submarine either on the surface or submerged to a fairly shallow depth, usually less than 250 feet (76 m). ELF (extremely low frequency) can reach a submarine at greater depths, but has a very low bandwidth and is generally used to call a submerged sub to a shallower depth where VLF signals can reach. A submarine also has the option of floating a long, buoyant wire antenna to a shallower depth, allowing VLF transmissions by a deeply submerged boat.

By extending a radio mast, a submarine can also use a "burst transmission" technique. A burst transmission takes only a fraction of a second, minimizing a submarine's risk of detection.

To communicate with other submarines, a system known as Gertrude is used. Gertrude is basically a sonar telephone. Voice communication from one submarine is transmitted by low power speakers into the water, where it is detected by passive sonars on the receiving submarine. The range of this system is probably very short, and using it radiates sound into the water, which can be heard by the enemy.

Civilian submarines can use similar, albeit less powerful systems to communicate with support ships or other submersibles in the area.

=== Life support systems ===
With nuclear power or air-independent propulsion, submarines can remain submerged for months at a time. Conventional diesel submarines must periodically resurface or run on snorkel to recharge their batteries. Most modern military submarines generate breathing oxygen by electrolysis of fresh water (using a device called an "Electrolytic Oxygen Generator"). Emergency oxygen can be produced by burning sodium chlorate candles. Atmosphere control equipment includes a Carbon dioxide scrubber, which uses a spray of monoethanolamine (MEA) absorbent to remove the gas from the air, after which the MEA is heated in a boiler to release the CO_{2} which is then pumped overboard. Emergency scrubbing can also be done with lithium hydroxide, which is consumable. A machine that uses a catalyst to convert carbon monoxide into carbon dioxide (removed by the CO_{2} scrubber) and bonds hydrogen produced from the ship's storage battery with oxygen in the atmosphere to produce water, is also used. An atmosphere monitoring system samples the air from different areas of the ship for nitrogen, oxygen, hydrogen, R-12 and R-114 refrigerants, carbon dioxide, carbon monoxide, and other gases. Poisonous gases are removed, and oxygen is replenished by use of an oxygen bank located in a main ballast tank. Some heavier submarines have two oxygen bleed stations (forward and aft). The oxygen in the air is sometimes kept a few percent less than atmospheric concentration to reduce fire risk.

Fresh water is produced by either an evaporator or a reverse osmosis unit. The primary use for fresh water is to provide feedwater for the reactor and steam propulsion plants. It is also available for showers, sinks, cooking and cleaning once propulsion plant needs have been met. Seawater is used to flush toilets, and the resulting "blackwater" is stored in a sanitary tank until it is blown overboard using pressurized air or pumped overboard by using a special sanitary pump. The blackwater-discharge system requires skill to operate, and isolation valves must be closed before discharge. The German Type VIIC boat U-1206 was lost with casualties because of human error while using this system. Water from showers and sinks is stored separately in "grey water" tanks and discharged overboard using drain pumps.

Trash on modern large submarines is usually disposed of using a tube called a Trash Disposal Unit (TDU), where it is compacted into a galvanized steel can. At the bottom of the TDU is a large ball valve. An ice plug is set on top of the ball valve to protect it, the cans atop the ice plug. The top breech door is shut, and the TDU is flooded and equalized with sea pressure, the ball valve is opened and the cans fall out assisted by scrap iron weights in the cans. The TDU is also flushed with seawater to ensure it is completely empty and the ball valve is clear before closing the valve.

== Crew ==
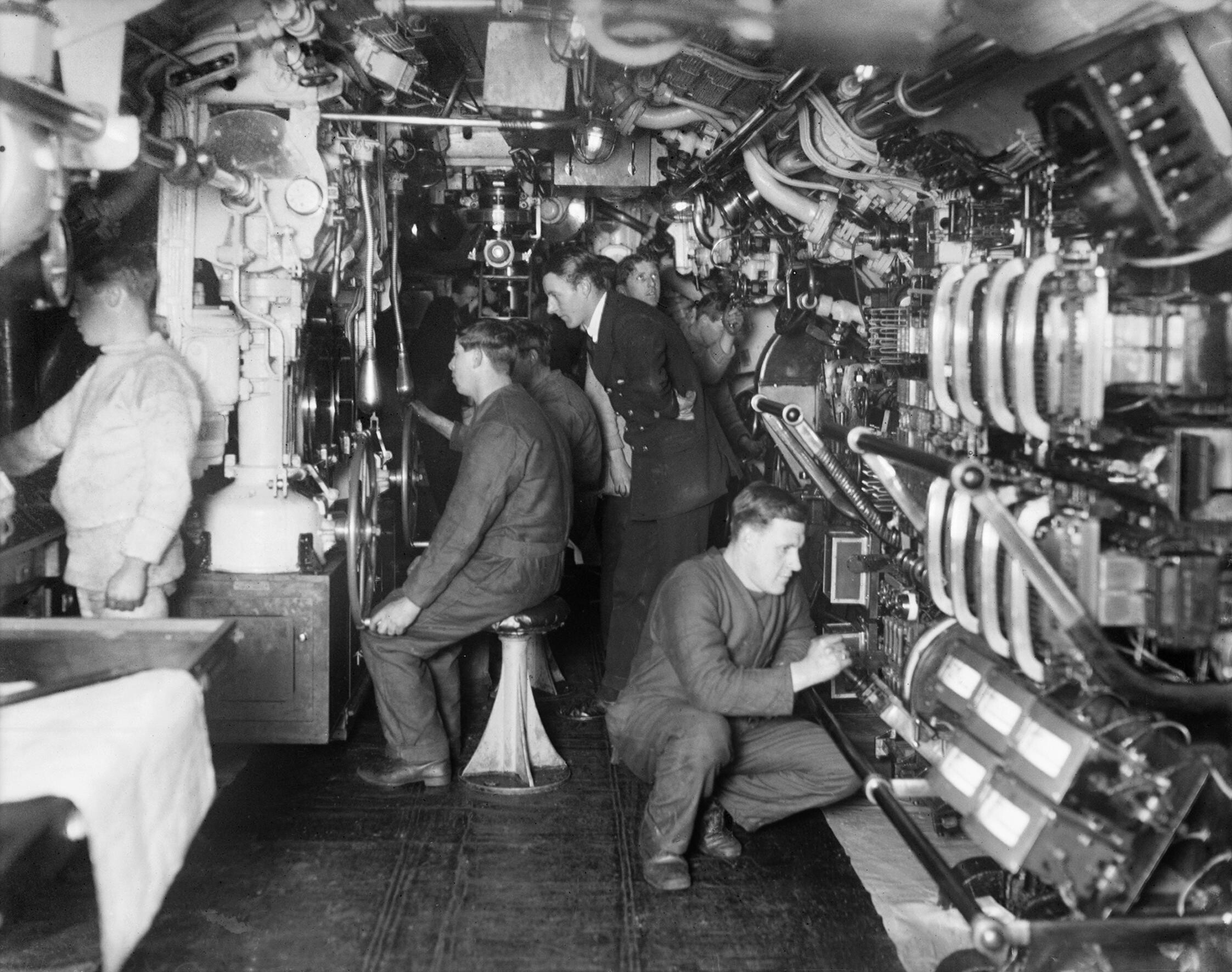
The interior of a British E-class submarine. An officer supervises submerging operations, c. 1914–1918.

A typical nuclear submarine has a crew of over 80; conventional boats typically have fewer than 40. The conditions on a submarine can be difficult because crew members must work in isolation for long periods of time, without family contact, and in cramped conditions. Submarines normally maintain radio silence to avoid detection. Operating a submarine is dangerous, even in peacetime, and many submarines have been lost in accidents.

=== Women ===
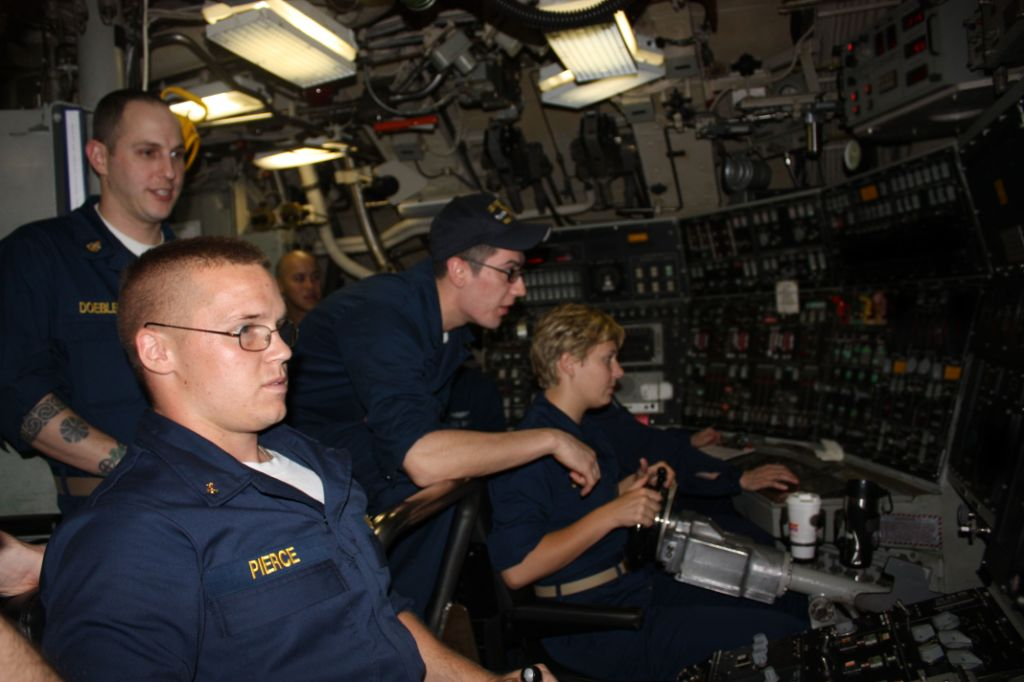
Midshipmen learn to pilot USS West Virginia (2010)

Most navies prohibited women from serving on submarines, even after they had been permitted to serve on surface warships. The Royal Norwegian Navy became the first navy to allow women on its submarine crews in 1985. The Royal Danish Navy allowed female submariners in 1988. Others followed suit including the Swedish Navy (1989), the Royal Australian Navy (1998), the Spanish Navy (1999), the German Navy (2001) and the Canadian Navy (2002). In 1995, Solveig Krey of the Royal Norwegian Navy became the first female officer to assume command on a military submarine, HNoMS Kobben.

On 8 December 2011, British Defence Secretary Philip Hammond announced that the UK's ban on women in submarines was to be lifted from 2013. Previously there were fears that women were more at risk from a build-up of carbon dioxide in the submarine. But a study showed no medical reason to exclude women, though pregnant women would still be excluded. Similar dangers to the pregnant woman and her fetus barred women from submarine service in Sweden in 1983, when all other positions were made available for them in the Swedish Navy. Today, pregnant women are still not allowed to serve on submarines in Sweden. However, the policymakers thought that it was discriminatory with a general ban and demanded that women should be tried on their individual merits and have their suitability evaluated and compared to other candidates. Further, they noted that a woman complying with such high demands is unlikely to become pregnant. In May 2014, three women became the RN's first female submariners.

Women have served on US Navy surface ships since 1993, and as of 2011–2012, began serving on submarines for the first time. Until presently, the Navy allowed only three exceptions to women being on board military submarines: female civilian technicians for a few days at most, women midshipmen on an overnight during summer training for Navy ROTC and Naval Academy, and family members for one-day dependent cruises. In 2009, senior officials, including then-Secretary of the Navy Ray Mabus, Joint Chief of Staff Admiral Michael Mullen, and Chief of Naval Operations Admiral Gary Roughead, began the process of finding a way to implement women on submarines. The US Navy rescinded its "no women on subs" policy in 2010.

Both the US and British navies operate nuclear-powered submarines that deploy for periods of six months or longer. Other navies that permit women to serve on submarines operate conventionally powered submarines, which deploy for much shorter periods—usually only for a few months. Prior to the change by the US, no nation using nuclear submarines permitted women to serve on board.

In 2011, the first class of female submarine officers graduated from Naval Submarine School's Submarine Officer Basic Course (SOBC) at the Naval Submarine Base New London. Additionally, more senior ranking and experienced female supply officers from the surface warfare specialty attended SOBC as well, proceeding to fleet Ballistic Missile (SSBN) and Guided Missile (SSGN) submarines along with the new female submarine line officers beginning in late 2011. By late 2011, several women were assigned to the Ohio-class ballistic missile submarine USS Wyoming. On 15 October 2013, the US Navy announced that two of the smaller Virginia-class attack submarines, USS Virginia and USS Minnesota, would have female crew-members by January 2015.

In 2020, Japan's national naval submarine academy accepted its first female candidate.

=== Abandoning the vessel ===
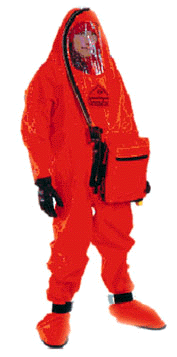
Submarine Escape Immersion Equipment suit Mk 10

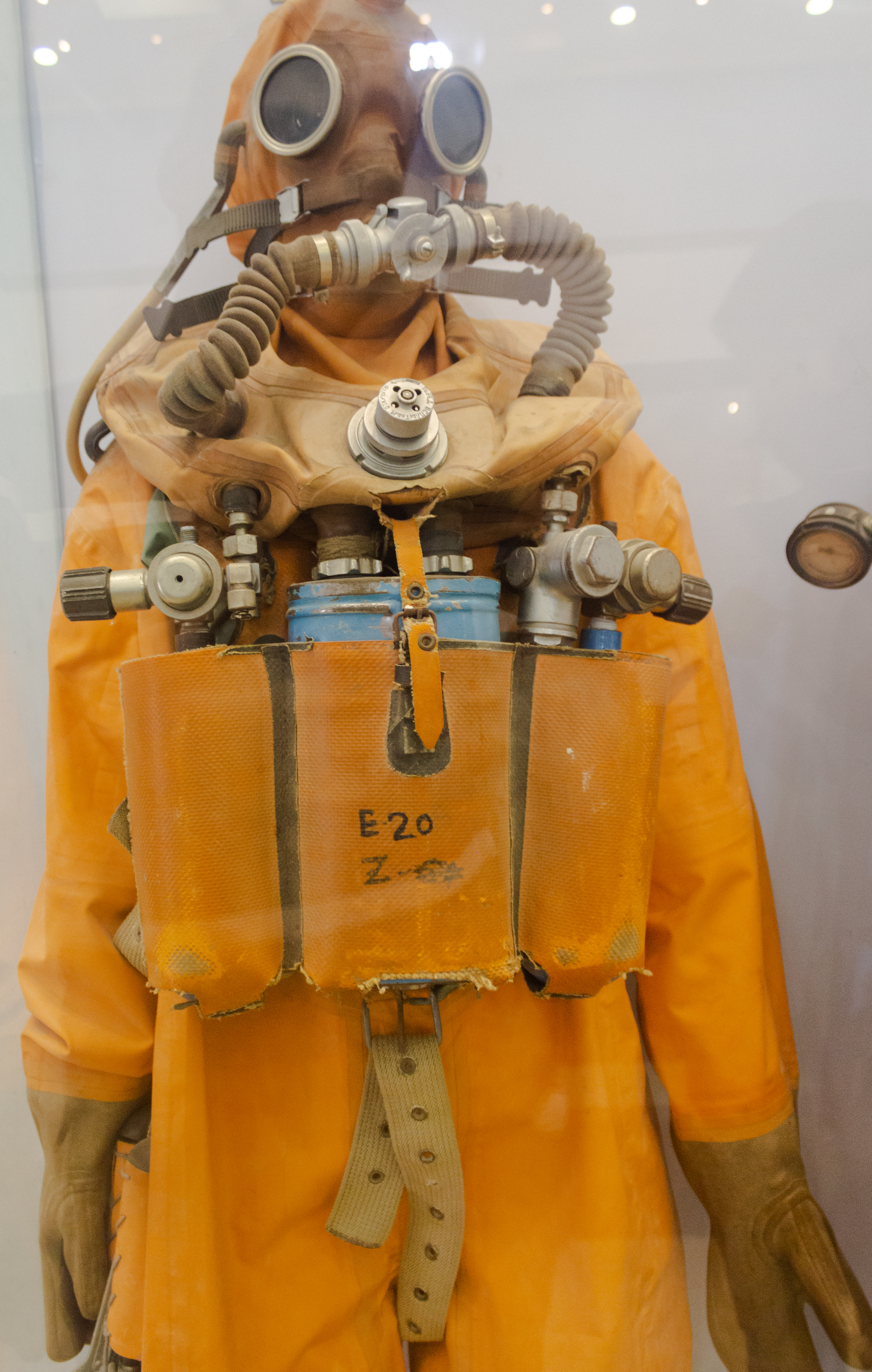
A submarine escape suit with rebreather

In an emergency, submarines can contact other ships to assist in rescue, and pick up the crew when they abandon ship. The crew can use escape sets such as the Submarine Escape Immersion Equipment to abandon the submarine via an escape trunk, which is a small airlock compartment that provides a route for crew to escape from a downed submarine at ambient pressure in small groups, while minimising the amount of water admitted to the submarine. The crew can avoid lung injury from over-expansion of air in the lungs due to the pressure change known as pulmonary barotrauma by maintaining an open airway and exhaling during the ascent. Following escape from a pressurized submarine, in which the air pressure is higher than atmospheric due to water ingress or other reasons, the crew is at risk of developing decompression sickness on return to surface pressure.

An alternative escape means is via a deep-submergence rescue vehicle that can dock onto the disabled submarine, establish a seal around the escape hatch, and transfer personnel at the same pressure as the interior of the submarine. If the submarine has been pressurised the survivors can lock into a decompression chamber on the submarine rescue ship and transfer under pressure for safe surface decompression.

== See also ==
- Autonomous underwater vehicle
- Coastal submarine
- Columbia-class submarine
- Depth charge
- Fictional submarines
- Flying submarine
- List of ships sunk by submarines by death toll
- List of submarine actions
- List of submarine classes
- List of submarine incidents since 2000
- List of submarine museums
- List of submarines of World War II
- List of specifications of submarines of World War II
- List of sunken nuclear submarines
- Merchant submarine
- Nuclear navy
- Semi-submersible naval vessel
- Submarine films
- Submarine power cable
- Submarine simulator, a computer game genre
- Supercavitation
- Unmanned underwater vehicle

=== By country ===
- List of submarine operators
- Australia – Collins-class submarine
- Bangladesh – Submarines of the Bangladesh Navy
- China – Submarines of the People's Liberation Army Navy
- France – Submarines in the French Navy, List of submarines of the French Navy, List of French submarine classes and types
- Germany – List of U-boats of Germany
- India – Submarines of the Indian Navy
- Israel – Dolphin-class submarine
- Japan – Imperial Japanese Navy submarines, List of combatant ship classes of the Japan Maritime Self-Defense Force § SS : Submarine
- The Netherlands – List of submarines of the Netherlands
- Pakistan – List of active Pakistan Navy ships § Submarines
- Poland – List of ships of the Polish Navy § Submarine fleet
- Romania – Romanian submarines of World War II
- Russia – List of Soviet and Russian submarine classes, Future Russian submarines
- Soviet Union – List of ships of the Soviet Navy § Submarines
- Spain – List of submarines of the Spanish Navy
- Singapore – Republic of Singapore Navy § Submarines
- Turkey – List of submarines of the Turkish Navy
- United Kingdom – List of submarines of the Royal Navy, List of submarine classes of the Royal Navy
- United States – Submarines in the US Navy, List of submarines of the US Navy, List of US submarine classes, Naval Submarine Medical Research Laboratory

== Bibliography ==
General history

- Mathey, Jean-Marie; Sheldon-Duplaix, Alexandre (2002). Histoire des sous-marins: des origines à nos jours. Boulogne-Billancourt: ETAI.
- DiMercurio, Michael; Benson, Michael (2003). The Complete Idiot's Guide to Submarines. Alpha. ISBN 978-0-02-864471-4. OCLC 51747264.
- Delgado, James P. (2011). Silent Killers: Submarines and Underwater Warfare. Oxford: Osprey Publishing. ISBN 978-1-84908-860-2.
- Fontenoy, Paul E. (2007). Submarines: An Illustrated History of Their Impact. Weapons and Warfare. Santa Barbara: ABC-CLIO. ISBN 978-1-85109-563-6.

Culture

- Redford, Duncan (2010). The Submarine: A Cultural History From the Great War to Nuclear Combat. I.B. Tauris. p. 322.

Submarines before 1914

- Gardiner, Robert (1992). Steam, Steel and Shellfire: The Steam Warship 1815–1905. Annapolis, Maryland: Naval Institute Press. ISBN 978-1-55750-774-7. OCLC 30038068.

1900/Russo-Japanese War 1904–1905

- Jentschura, Hansgeorg; Jung, Dieter; Mickel, Peter (1977). Warships of the Imperial Japanese Navy 1869–1945. Annapolis, Maryland: Naval Institute Press. ISBN 978-0-87021-893-4.
- Olender, Piotr (2010). Russo-Japanese Naval War 1904–1905 Vol. 2: Battle of Tsushima. Sandomierz, Poland: Stratus s.c. ISBN 978-83-61421-02-3.
- Showell, Jak (2006). The U-Boat Century: German Submarine Warfare 1906–2006. Great Britain: Chatham Publishing. ISBN 978-1-86176-241-2.
- Simmons, Jacques (1971). A Grosset All-Color Guide: Warships. USA: Grosset & Dunlap, Inc. ISBN 978-0-448-04165-0.
- Watts, Anthony J. (1990). The Imperial Russian Navy. London: Arms and Armour Press. ISBN 978-0-85368-912-6.

World War II

- Blair, Clay (1975). Silent Victory: The U.S. Submarine War Against Japan. Philadelphia: Lippincott. ISBN 978-0-397-00753-0. OCLC 821363.
- Lockwood, Charles A. (1951). Sink 'Em All: Submarine Warfare in the Pacific. New York: Dutton. OCLC 1371626.
- O'Kane, Richard H. (1977). Clear the Bridge!: The War Patrols of the USS Tang. Chicago: Rand McNally. ISBN 978-0-528-81058-9. OCLC 2965421.
- O'Kane, Richard H. (1987). Wahoo: The Patrols of America's Most Famous World War II Submarine. Novato, California: Presidio Press. ISBN 978-0-89141-301-1. OCLC 15366413.
- Werner, Herbert A. (1999). Iron Coffins: A Personal Account of the German U-Boat Battles of World War II. London: Cassell Military. ISBN 978-0-304-35330-9. OCLC 41466905.
- Beach, Edward L. (1952). Submarine!. H. Holt. OCLC 396382.

Cold War

- Huchthausen, Peter; Sheldon-Duplaix, Alexandre (2008). Hide and Seek: The Untold Story of Cold War Espionage at Sea. Hoboken, NJ: J. Wiley & Sons. ISBN 978-0-471-78530-9.
- McHale, Gannon (2008). Stealth Boat: Fighting the Cold War in a Fast Attack Submarine. Naval Institute Press. ISBN 978-1-59114-502-8. OCLC 216938657.
