= List of pre-20th century submarines =

This list of pre-20th century submarines includes those pioneering submarines constructed prior to the turn of the 20th century, which marks the point when the submarine became a viable weapon of war. This saw the advent of such vessels as the American USS Holland and the French Narval, which set the pattern for submarine design for much of the 20th century.

== List ==
Name	Builder	Launched	Lost or disposed	Notes
Drebbel	Cornelis Drebbel	1620	?	Propelled by oars.
Papin	Denis Papin	1690	?	
Nikonov	Yefim Nikonov (ru)	1720	?	Build for Peter the Great in Russia.
Turtle	David Bushnell	1775	1777	First submarine vessel used in attempted combat.
Nautilus	Robert Fulton	1797	1802	Built for the French Navy.
Villeroi	Brutus de Villeroi	August 1832	?	Demonstrated at Noirmoutier in France.
Schilder (ru)	Karl Schilder (ru)	1834	?	Demonstrated to Tsar Nicholas I in Russia.
Hipopótamo (es)	Jose Rodriguez Lavandera (es)	18 Sep 1837	?	Tested in Ecuador.
Brandtaucher	Wilhelm Bauer	1850	1 Feb 1851	Sank during trials, model displayed in the Bundeswehr Military History Museum in Dresden.
Gern	Ottomar Gern	1854	?	Fate unknown.
Ictineo I	Narcís Monturiol	1859	January 1862	Destroyed in an accident, completed 50 dives before loss. Replica in Maritime Museum in Barcelona.
Salvage	Brutus de Villeroi	1859	1862	Built at Philadelphia, it was the basis for the USS Alligator. Seized by police in 1862.
Garcibuzo (es)	Cosme García Sáez	1860	?	Test dived at Alicante. Garcia was unable to find a buyer and the boat was scuttled.
Bayou St. John submarine	Unknown	1861	1863	First submarine built for the Confederate States Navy of America. On display at the Capitol Park Museum - Baton Rouge.
Pioneer	Horace Lawson Hunley	Feb 1862	25 Apr 1862	Built for the Confederate States Navy. A replica is at the Warren Lasch Conservation Center.
USS Alligator	Neafie & Levy	1 May 1862	2 Apr 1863	First United States Navy of America submarine.
American Diver	Horace Lawson Hunley	Jan 1863	Feb 1863	Built for the Confederate States Navy, also known as Pioneer II. It sank in Mobile Bay.
Plongeur	Siméon Bourgois	16 Apr 1863	2 Feb 1872	Built for the French Navy, converted to water tanker in 1873 and sold for scrap in 1937.
H. L. Hunley	Horace Lawson Hunley	Jul 1863	17 Feb 1864	Built for the Confederate States Navy, first combat submarine to sink a warship and then sank. Located at the Warren Lasch Conservation Center in Charleston, South Carolina.
Intelligent Whale	Price and Bushnell	1863	Sep 1872	On exhibit at the National Guard Militia Museum of New Jersey.
Ictíneo II	Narcís Monturiol	20 May 1864	Dec 1867	Intended for the Spanish Navy, sold for scrap, replica on display at harbor of Barcelona.
Alexandrovski	Ivan Alexandrovski (ru)	1865	?	Demonstrated to Tsar Alexander II in Russia.
Sub Marine Explorer	Patterson and Kroehl	1865	1869	Abandoned on shore of the island of San Telmo in the Pearl Islands.
Flach	Karl Flach (es)	1866	3 May 1866	Built for Chile, lost in the bay of Valparaíso.
Heyermann	Gustavo Heyermann	1866	?	Built for Chile, sank on its maiden voyage.
Gryparis	Gryparis	1875	1886	Possibly available to the Hellenic Navy.
Drzewiecki	Stefan Drzewiecki	1877	?	Human powered, model in the National Maritime Museum in Gdansk.
Holland I	John Philip Holland	22 May 1878	1878	Scuttled and raised in 1927, it is on display at the Paterson Museum in New Jersey.
Resurgam I	George Garrett	1878	?	Fate unknown.
Drzewiecki	Stefan Drzewiecki	1879	?	Converted from human powered to electric propulsion by Drzewiecki in 1884, it is on display in the Central Naval Museum in Saint Petersburg.
Resurgam II	George Garrett	26 Nov 1879	25 Feb 1880	Sank in Liverpool Bay, replica on display near Woodside terminal of Mersey Ferry.
Toro Submarino	Blume and Peruvian Navy	1879	16 Jan 1881	Scuttled to avoid capture.
Drzewiecki submarine series (ru)	Stefan Drzewiecki	1881	1891	A class of 50 boats built for harbour defence and withdrawn from service in 1891.
Fenian Ram (Holland II)	John Philip Holland	1881	1883	On display at the Paterson Museum in New Jersey.
Holland III	John Philip Holland	1881	Nov 1883	Stolen and sunk in Hudson river.
Nordenfelt I	Thorsten Nordenfelt	1885	1901	Sold to the Hellenic Navy and named Pireas, proved a failure and was scrapped in 1901.
Zalinski Boat (Holland IV)	John Philip Holland	Sep 1885	1886	Funded by Edmund Zalinski and sold in 1886.
Nautilus	Ash and Campbell	1886	?	Became stuck in the mud during trials and was discontinued.
Porpoise	James Franklin Waddington	1886	?	Never sold and broken up for scrap.
Abdül Hamid (Nordenfelt II)	Barrow shipyard	6 Sep 1886	1910	Nordenfelt class, first submarine attempt to launch a live torpedo underwater and then sank, proved a failure and was scrapped.
Abdül Mecit (Nordenfelt III)	Barrow shipyard	1886	1910	Nordenfelt class, proved a failure and was scrapped.
Vuteas	Vuteas	1886	?	Possibly available to the Hellenic Navy.
Nordenfelt IV	Thorsten Nordenfelt	1887	1887	Sold to the Russian government, proved a failure and was scrapped.
Gymnote	Zédé & Krebs	24 Sep 1888	1908	A research submarine that completed over 2,000 dives and then was scrapped.
Peral	Isaac Peral	1888	1890	Build for the Spanish Navy, On display at Cartagena Naval Museum.
Delfino	Giacinto Pullino (it)	1890	1919	Built for the Italian Regia Marina, it was stricken in 1919.
Gustave Zédé	Zédé & Romazzotti	1893	1911	One of the world's earliest effective naval submarines.
Vodobronnogo	Stefan Drzewiecki	1893	?	
Argonaut Junior	Simon Lake	1894	1895	
Argonaut 1 & Argonaut 2	Simon Lake	1897	1901	The Argonaut 2 was an enlarged reconstruction of the Argonaut 1.
Plunger (Holland V)	John Philip Holland	7 Aug 1897	1899	Scrapped in 1917.
USS Holland (SS-1) (Holland VI)	John Philip Holland	1897	1910	Commissioned in 1900 and decommissioned in 1905.
Versuchs-U-Boot (de)	Karl Leps	1897	1898	Scrapped in 1902
Morse	Gaston Romazzotti	1899	1909	Stricken following an accident at sea.
Narval	Maxime Laubeuf	1899	1920	First double hulled dual propulsion boat, archetype for most European submarine designs in 20th century.
Fulton	Crescent shipyard	1901	1905	A prototype of the Plunger-class, also known as A-class. It was sold to Russia in 1905.
Protector	Simon Lake	1901	1904	Sold to Russia in 1904.

== See also ==
- List of submarines of the United States Navy
- List of submarines of the Royal Navy
