= Holland IV =

Early test submarine of the United States

- Holland IV , also called the Zalinski Boat in 1885

History

United States
- Name: Holland Boat No. IV
- Namesake: John Philip Holland
- Builder: John Philip Holland
- Launched: September 4, 1885
- Fate: Sold for scrap after testing at the end of 1886
- Notes: Wooden hull with iron supports

General characteristics
- Type: Submarine
- Length: 50 ft (15 m)
- Beam: 8 ft (2.4 m)
- Propulsion: 1 × 4 hp (3 kW) Brayton petroleum engine; 1 screw
- Speed: 7.8 knots (14.4 km/h; 9.0 mph)
- Crew: 1

The Holland IV , also called the Zalinski Boat, was an experimental submarine built by Irish marine engineer John Philip Holland and financed by United States Army Lieutenant Edmund Zalinski in 1885. For the project Holland and Zalinski founded the Nautilus Submarine Boat Company (1885-1886).

== History ==
Edmund Zalinski wanted a vessel for the Zalinski dynamite gun. John Philip Holland was a submarine engineer and inventor. Edmund Zalinski and some of his friends and employees put in the funds for the prototype submarine. Holland designed a one-man submarine 50 feet long and 8 feet in diameter built with a wooden hull on an iron frame. On September 4, 1885, the Holland IV was seriously damaged during a launch. The launch wood ship way broke as the sub was being launched. Holland IV then smashed into pier pilings. The Holland IV was raised, repaired and taken to Fort Hamilton in Brooklyn, New York. The operator of the Holland IV would stand in the center of the vessel and was able to look out glass windows to maneuver the submarine. The submarine has a single propeller powered by a Brayton cycle gasoline engine. To dive and surface the sub had vertical and horizontal rudders movable by the operator. The Holland IV used compressed air to surface the submarine. Holland IV has a top speed of 9 mph. Initial tests at Hendrick's Reef, near Fort Lafayette, New York, were good as the submarine was able to successfully dive and surface. For safety, Holland had designs so the operator could depart the submarine.

  - The Holland IV was designed to have three modes of attacking other vessels:
- Zalinski dynamite gun, to be placed at the bow of the submarine.
- Maneuver the submarine under a vessel and detach buoyant cartridges charge. Then move the submarine away from the charge and detonate the explosive charge using electricity over wires.
- Fire a steel-pointed cartridge explosive charge into the bottom of a vessel. Then move the submarine away from the charge and detonate the explosive charge using electricity over wires.

== Background ==
Holland's first submarine was the Holland I built and tested in 1878. Holland's second submarine was the Fenian Ram also called the Holland II, built and tested in 1881. The Holland III was built and tested in 1883. The most successful submarine Holland VI, was launched May 17, 1897, later sold to the United States Navy and renamed USS Holland (SS-1). The Holland Torpedo Boat Company was founded 1893.

== See also ==
- Peral Submarine Spanish submarine of 1888
- Gymnote French submarine
- History of submarines
- Plunger (1897)
- Holland I
- Holland II
- Holland III
