= Zalinski (surname) =

Zalinski is a surname. Notable people with the surname include:

- Edmund Zalinski (1849–1909), Polish-born American soldier, military engineer, and inventor
- Henryk Żaliński (born 1938), Polish historian
- Wojciech Żaliński (born 1988), Polish volleyball player
