= Harry Cunningham (activist) =

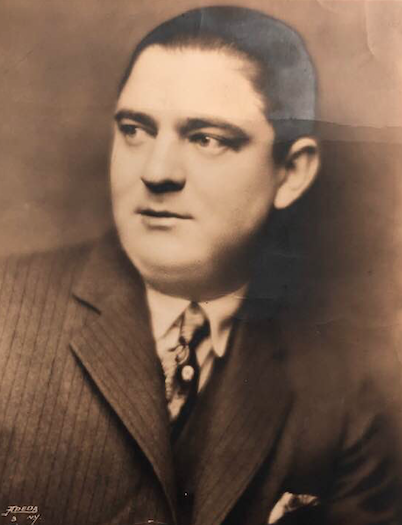
- Born: Henry Conaghan; 1891; County Donegal, Ireland
- Died: 1938 (aged 46–47); Bronx, New York, United States
- Occupation: Irish-American activist

Harry Cunningham (1891–1938) was an early 20th century Irish-American activist. He held executive positions in several New York-based Irish-American cultural and political organizations, many of which were focused on mobilizing materiel support to the fight for an independent Irish republic. He was a close friend and confidant of John Devoy, long-time leader of the Clan-na-Gael organization, especially in Devoy's later years as his health declined. Though active in many aspects of early 20th century New York Irish-American life, Cunningham is best known for saving John Holland's Fenian Ram, the world's first functioning submarine and symbol of Irish-American ingenuity, from destruction in 1927.

== Early life and immigration ==
Harry Cunningham was born Henry Conaghan in 1891 in Mountcharles, County Donegal, Ireland, to farmers John and Winifred Campbell Conaghan. As a young man, he anglicized his name to Cunningham. In 1909, he departed for the United States and settled in New York City; first in Manhattan, later in the Bronx. He became a naturalized US citizen in 1914.

== Organizations ==
=== Clan-na-Gael ===
A successor to the 19th century Fenian Brotherhood, the Clan-na-Gael (Family of the Gaels) was a quasi-clandestine Irish republican organization that operated as a US-based adjunct to the Ireland-based underground Irish Republican Brotherhood. Led by John Devoy, Clan-na-Gael orchestrated a wide range of schemes and programs designed to aid the Irish republican cause from across the ocean. The date of Cunningham's affiliation is not known. Nevertheless, he quickly developed a close rapport with Devoy—according to a press account; "he never failed in any task assigned to him by Mr. Devoy, regardless of the personal risk or the intelligence required to complete it successfully".

=== Friends of Irish Freedom ===
Cunningham served on the National Council of the Friends of Irish Freedom, and also held the post of national solicitor for the organization. Established in 1916 in the months prior to the Easter Rising, the FOIF was a large-scale, overt advocacy group designed to propagandize on behalf of Irish independence, and marshal the resources of the sizeable Irish-American population for the fight against British rule in Ireland. In 1919, when Irish provisional government Finance Minister Michael Collins developed the "Dáil bonds" program to raise money for the administration, FOIF mobilized over $5 million in American investment. Devoy's Clan-na-Gael dominated FOIF executive positions.

== First voyage to Ireland ==
The August 1922 assassination of Michael Collins during the Irish Civil War was a shock to the Irish-American community. Cunningham, speaking in part on behalf of the FOIF, offered the following statement to the New York Tribune:

The real friends of Ireland deplore the irreparable loss she has suffered in the slaying of Michael Collins, the fearless, courageous leader of the Irish people. Only madmen could have been guilty of such an outrage which has shocked the entire civilized world. But the cause for which Collins was fighting will live.

During the Irish Civil War, the Devoy-led organizations in the United States supported the Irish Free State government over the Anti-Treaty forces led by Eamon de Valera. Once the war ended, Devoy was invited to tour Ireland as the invited guest of President William T. Cosgrave. Cunningham served as Devoy's personal escort throughout the six-week tour, meeting with senior government officials and other notable personalities - among them Foreign Minister Desmond Fitzgerald and Mrs. Mary Collins Powell, sister of the deceased Michael Collins, who greeted them upon arrival in Cobh, Cork.

== Saving the Fenian Ram ==
Cunningham was keen on preserving artifacts of the Irish-American experience. The Fenian Ram was an experimental submarine designed and built by Irish immigrant inventor John P. Holland. John Devoy and the Clan-na-Gael financed its construction in 1879-80, with the idea that it would sink British shipping during a future Irish uprising. The vessel never saw combat and ultimately became an exhibit on the campus of Clason Point Military Academy in the Bronx, New York. On May 27, 1927, the Academy, preparing to move its campus to Long Island, sold the hull to a junk dealer for $100.

The transaction was reported in the press, leaving many astounded that this historical artifact was destined for destruction. Upon learning the news, Holland's son Joseph stated he would have purchased it himself, if only to give the vessel a proper burial at sea than to face demolition. Similarly, a newspaper from Holland's hometown of Paterson, New Jersey—where Holland conducted his initial submarine trials on the Passaic River—called for the return of the submarine’s engine that had been built there. However, Cunningham moved first – on June 25, 1927 he purchased the Fenian Ram from the junkyard for $650.

Suddenly, other buyers were interested, among them the American Irish Historical Society, the Board of Directors of Celtic Park (Queens, New York), the Smithsonian Institution, and industrialist Henry Ford, who operated his own museum of industrial innovations and artifacts. Ford reportedly sent a representative to Cunningham's residence in the Bronx with a blank check hoping to make a quick purchase; however, Cunningham was away at the hospital, tending to his 12-year old daughter Catherine, then terminally ill.

On behalf of Clan-na-Gael, Cunningham held title to the submarine for a little over 2 months. On September 9, 1927, he sold the Fenian Ram to Edward A. Browne, an automobile dealer from Paterson. The details of the transaction between Cunningham and Browne are not known. Browne donated the hull to the Paterson city parks commission as a memorial to John Holland who made so many engineering achievements in the city. Today, the submarine is on display at the Paterson Museum in Paterson.

== Second voyage to Ireland ==
By September 1928, Devoy—now 86 years old—was in failing health, and Cunningham brought him to Atlantic City for convalescence. On September 29, Devoy died in his hotel room in Cunningham's presence. As executor of his estate, Cunningham prepared for a second trip to Ireland, this time to escort Devoy's remains to Dublin for burial.

Prior to departure, Cunningham corresponded with Irish President Cosgrave via the President’s aide-de-camp Col. Joseph Reilly regarding the purchase of the burial plot and other details of the funeral arrangements. On June 5, 1929, Cunningham—as leader of the American escort party—departed Hoboken, New Jersey with the body of John Devoy, destined for Ireland. On June 16, Devoy was interred in Glasnevin Cemetery alongside other prominent figures of the Irish revolutionary period. He was afforded a state funeral with full honors. Cunningham funded the plot and headstone at Glasnevin.

Later, on June 25, Cunningham was the guest of honor at a luncheon hosted by President Cosgrave in the Shelbourne Hotel, Dublin. Several government ministers, members of Dáil Éireann (Irish parliament) and other senior officials were also in attendance.

== Other activities ==
Cunningham was a sports enthusiast, and served for a time as President of the Irish-American Athletic Club. He also held executive positions in the Thomas J. Clarke club, the American Irish Historical Society, and the New York Philo-Celtic Society. He was an active member of the Irish Republican Brotherhood Veterans Association and the Ancient Order of Hibernians.

== Later years and death ==
After a long illness, Harry Cunningham died on August 23, 1938, at the House of Calvary Hospital (today Calvary Hospital), in the Bronx, New York. His requiem Mass, con-celebrated by five priests and two deacons, was held at the Church of St. Vincent Ferrer, in the Lenox Hill section of Manhattan.

== Personal ==
Upon first arrival in New York, Cunningham worked as an ice delivery truck driver. Later, he worked as a real estate appraiser in the New York City Office of the Comptroller. On April 2, 1913, he married Teresa McMahon (1886–1968), an immigrant from County Monaghan, Ireland. After the wedding, the couple returned to Ireland for a month to visit family.

Harry and Teresa had three children: Catherine (who died in adolescence), John, and Alice. In 1916, at the height of the World War I German submarine scare, Teresa embarked with infant Catherine for a visit to Ireland that would last 18 months, during which time she gave birth to John. Whether she was carrying out an assignment on behalf of her husband, recovering from giving birth to John, or simply unable to secure timely safe passage back to America due to the wartime emergency, has not been determined.
