= USS Vesuvius (1888) =

American ship

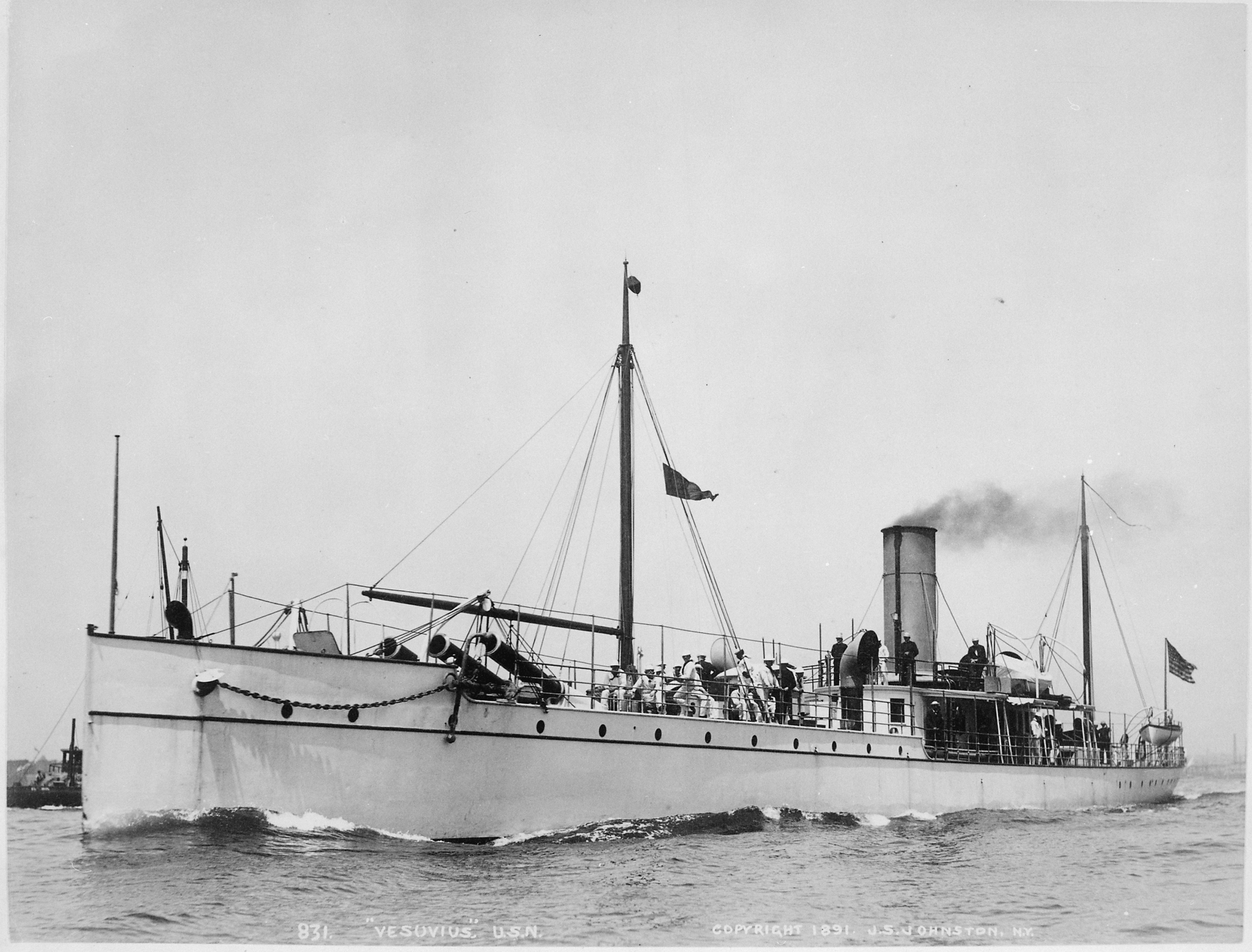
- Vesuvius in 1891

History

United States
- Name: USS Vesuvius
- Namesake: Mount Vesuvius
- Ordered: 3 August 1886
- Builder: William Cramp & Sons, Philadelphia
- Yard number: 256
- Laid down: September 1887
- Launched: 28 April 1888
- Commissioned: 3 June 1890
- Decommissioned: 21 October 1921
- Stricken: 21 April 1922
- Fate: Sold for scrapping

General characteristics
- Type: Dynamite gun cruiser
- Displacement: 930 long tons (945 t)
- Length: 246 ft 3 in (75.06 m)
- Beam: 26 ft 6 in (8.08 m)
- Draft: 9 ft (2.7 m)
- Depth: 14 ft (4.3 m)
- Propulsion: 2 × 2,183 hp (1,628 kW) 4-cylinder triple-expansion steam engines
- Speed: 21 knots (39 km/h; 24 mph)
- Complement: 70 officers and enlisted
- Armament: 3 × 15 in (380 mm) pneumatic guns; 3 × 3-pounder guns

USS Vesuvius, the third ship of the United States Navy named for the Italian volcano, was a unique vessel in the Navy inventory which marked a departure from more conventional forms of main battery armament. She is considered a dynamite gun cruiser and was essentially an operational testbed for large dynamite guns.

Vesuvius was laid down in September 1887 at Philadelphia by William Cramp & Sons Ships and Engine Building Company, subcontracted from the Pneumatic Dynamite Gun Company of New York City. She was launched on 28 April 1888 sponsored by Miss Eleanor Breckinridge and commissioned on 2 June 1890 at the Philadelphia Navy Yard with Lieutenant Seaton Schroeder in command.

== Dynamite guns ==
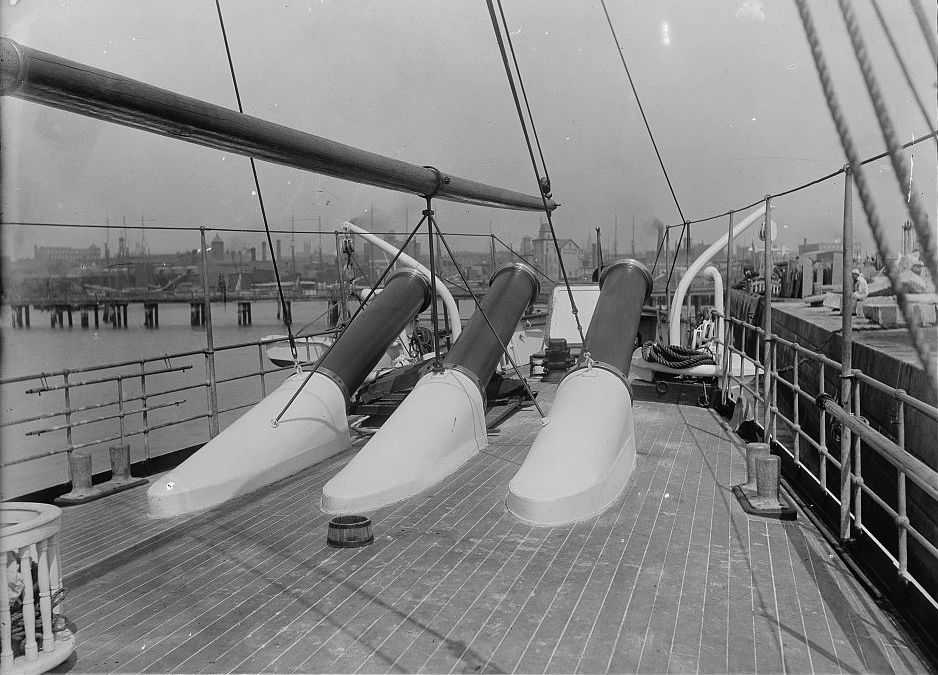
Dynamite gun muzzles on Vesuvius

Vesuvius carried three 15-inch (38 cm) cast-iron pneumatic guns, invented by D. M. Medford and developed by Edmund Zalinski, a retired officer of the United States Army. They were mounted forward side by side at a fixed elevation of 16 degrees. Gun barrels were 55 feet (17 meters) long with the muzzles extending 15 feet (4.6 meters) through the deck 37 feet (11 meters) abaft the bow. In order to train these weapons, the ship had to be aimed, like a gun, at its target. Compressed air from a 1000 psi (70 atm) reservoir projected the shells from the dynamite guns. Two air compressors were available to recharge the reservoir.

The shells fired from the guns were steel or brass casings 7 feet (2.1 meters) long with the explosive contained in the conical forward part of the casing and spiral vanes on the after part to rotate the projectile. The explosive used in the shells themselves was actually a "desensitized blasting gelatin" composed of nitrocellulose and nitroglycerin. It was less sensitive to shock than regular dynamite, but still sensitive enough that compressed air, rather than powder, had to be utilized as the propellant. Shells containing 550 pounds (250 kg) of explosive had a maximum range of 1 mile (1.6 km), but range could be extended to 4,000 yards (3.7 km) by reducing projectile weight to 200 pounds (91 kg). Maximum muzzle velocity was 800 feet (240 meters) per second. Range could be reduced by releasing less compressed air from the reservoir. Ten shells per gun were carried on board, and 15 shells were fired in 16 minutes 50 seconds during an 1889 test. The shells employed an electrical fuze which could be either set to explode on contact or delayed to explode underwater.

== Service history ==
=== Shakedown cruise ===
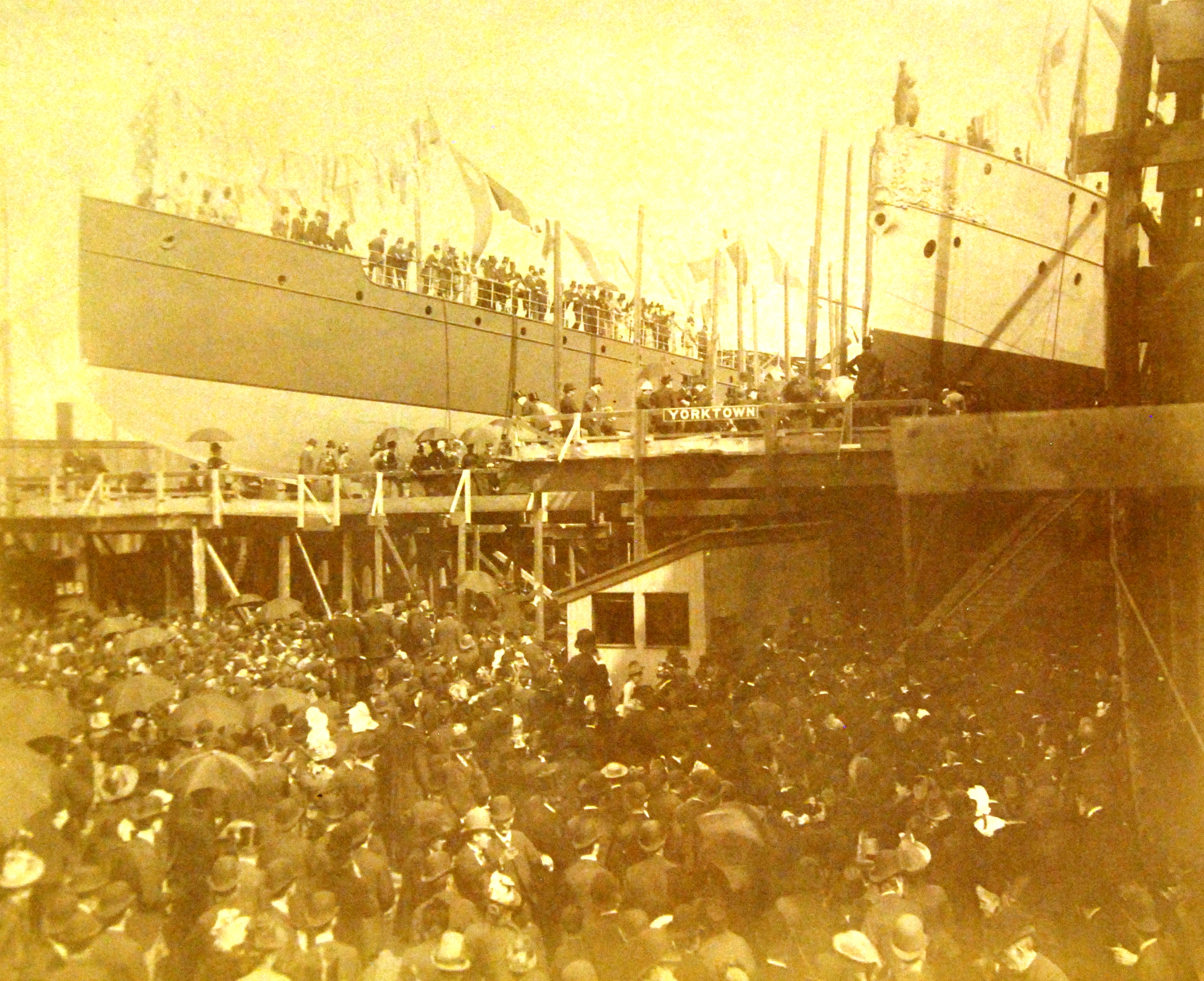
Vesuvius (left) and Yorktown being launched in Philadelphia, 28 April 1888

Vesuvius sailed for New York shortly after commissioning and then joined the Fleet at Gardiner's Bay, New York, on 1 October 1890. She operated off the east coast with the North Atlantic Squadron into 1895. Highlights of this tour of duty included numerous port visits and participation in local observances of holidays and festivals, as well as gunnery practice and exercises. Experience showed that the ship's unique main battery had two major drawbacks: first, the range was too short; second, the method of aiming was crude and inaccurate.

=== Spanish–American War ===
Decommissioned on 25 April 1895 for major repairs, Vesuvius re-entered service on 12 January 1897 with Lieutenant Commander John E. Pillsbury in command. The ship got underway from Philadelphia Navy Yard, bound for Florida, and operated off the east coast through the spring of the following year, 1898. By this time, American relations with Spain were worsening. The American Fleet gathered in Florida waters, and Vesuvius hurried south from Newport, Rhode Island, and arrived at Key West, Florida, on 13 May. She remained there until 28 May, when she headed for blockade duty in Cuban coastal waters. Vesuvius performed special duties at the discretion of the Fleet Commander in Chief and served as a dispatch vessel between Cuba and Florida into July 1898.

On 13 June, Vesuvius conducted the first of eight shore bombardment missions against Santiago, Cuba. The cruiser stealthily closed with the shore under cover of darkness, loosed a few rounds of her 15-inch dynamite charges, and then retired to sea. Psychologically, Vesuvius's bombardment caused great anxiety among the Spanish forces ashore, for her devastating shells came in without warning, unaccompanied by the roar of gunfire usually associated with a bombardment. Admiral Sampson wrote accordingly, that Vesuvius bombardments had "great effect." Although the dynamite guns were relatively quiet, detonation of their large high explosive shells sounded different from contemporary gunpowder-filled artillery shells; and soldiers observed the explosions "made holes like the cellar of a country house."

=== Post-war conversion ===
After hostilities with Spain ended later that summer, Vesuvius sailed north and called at Charleston, South Carolina, New York, and Newport, before reaching Boston, Massachusetts. Taken out of active service on 16 September 1898, Vesuvius remained at the Boston Navy Yard until 1904, when she began conversion to a torpedo-testing vessel. Vesuvius lost her unique main battery and acquired four torpedo tubes — three 18 inch (450 mm) and one 21-inch. Recommissioned on 21 June 1905, Vesuvius soon sailed for the Naval Torpedo Station in Newport, Rhode Island to begin her new career.

She conducted torpedo experiments at the station for two years until decommissioned on 27 November 1907 for repairs. Recommissioned again on 14 February 1910, Vesuvius remained at Newport for the next 11 years, on occasion serving as station ship, into 1921.

In May 1913, a torpedo fired from Vesuvius ran a circular course and punctured the hull of the ship. Damage control efforts by her crew and the quick judgment of her commanding officer, Chief Gunner Thomas Smith, prevented her from sinking before she was intentionally run aground on Prudence Island in Narragansett Bay.

She was decommissioned and ordered appraised for sale on 21 April 1922 to J. Lipsitz and Company of Chelsea, Massachusetts.

The ship's bell of Vesuvius is on display in the administration building of the Rhode Island Veterans Home in Bristol, Rhode Island.

== Awards ==
- Sampson Medal
- Spanish Campaign Medal
- World War I Victory Medal

== See also ==
- USS Vesuvius (AE-15)
- USS Katahdin
- Bomb vessels – similarly designed vessels from the Age of Sail.

== Bibliography ==
- R. Busetto, La USS Vesuvius, in Rivista Marittima, 1997, vol. 507, p. 81
- Johnson, Harold (September 2017). "Question 30/53". Warship International. LIV (3): 192–193. ISSN 0043-0374.
- The White Squadron. [Toledo, Ohio]: Woolson Spice Co., 1891. OCLC 45112425
