= Winfield Scott Sims =

American inventor (1844–1918)

Winfield Scott Sims (April 6, 1844 – January 7, 1918) was an American inventor.

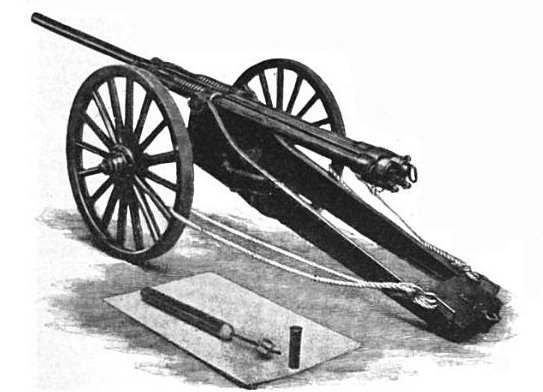
Sims-Dudley 4 Inch Dynamite Gun on field mount

Sims was born in New York City, son of Lindsay D. and Catherine B. Sims. Sims attended the public schools of Newark, New Jersey. He had just graduated from the high school when the American Civil War broke out. He enlisted in the 37th Regiment New Jersey Volunteers and served until 1864. Sims has specialized in the application of electric power to marine vehicles and in the invention of high power war weapons. He was the first to apply electricity to the propulsion of torpedoes.

Among his inventions is a submarine boat with a cylindrical hull of copper having conical ends and with a screw propeller and rudder operated by electric power generated on shore or on ship board, by means of which the torpedo is propelled, guided and exploded. Among Sims’ earlier inventions were various devices in electromagnets and the construction of an electric motor, weighing 45 pounds for light work, with a battery of twenty half gallon Bensen cells that propelled an open boat sixteen feet long with six persons on it, at the rate of four miles an hour. His invention of the submarine torpedo boat was followed by the devising of a boat with a speed of 22 miles an hour to carry a 500-pound charge of dynamite.

He invented also a wireless dirigible torpedo for the Japanese Government in 1907. The Sims-Dudley dynamite gun, also of his invention, was used by the Cuban insurgents, and, at the battle of Santiago by the "Rough Riders". Others of his designs are a dynamite gun for use with dirigible war ships and an aeroplane dynamite gun.

Sims was president of the New York Ordnance Company. He died in Newark in 1918.
