= C.B.S. Secondary School Ennistymon =

Coordinates: 52°56′30.21″N 9°17′21.21″W

CBS Ennistymon
- Meanscoil na mBraithre, Inis Diomáin
- Ennistymon, County Clare, Ireland

Information
- Established: 1824; 202 years ago
- Principal: Mary Lyons
- Staff: 24
- Enrollment: c. 220
- Website: www.cbsennistymon.com

CBS Ennistymon is an all-boys secondary school located in Ennistymon, County Clare. It was founded in 1824 by Edmund Ignatius Rice and is one of the oldest Christian Brothers schools in Ireland. It is also the only all-boys school in County Clare. The last brother to be principal (Brother Ned Hayden) left the school in 1996; Micheál Ó Maolchaoin was acting principal for 2 years and then became the first lay principal of the school. The current secondary school was built in 1974; a primary school was opened in 1939 and was closed in early 2000.

== History ==
The school was founded by Edmund Ignatius Rice in 1824, when two Christian Brothers arrived in Ennistymon. An old chapel which was built in 1812 was renovated and transformed into a brothers' residence and a secondary and primary school. From 1824 to 1930 the primary school and secondary school were all located in the same room. A primary school was built in the rear in the 1930s; it closed in the early 2000s and the building is now part of the secondary school, who use it as Technical Graphics and Woodwork rooms.

The original school building was used up to 1974, when the school's Superior, Br. Sheehan, had the hill above the monastery cleared and a new secondary school and playing field built. Until 1972 the school operated totally through the medium of Irish. The school's original name was Mount St. Joseph's Secondary and Primary School or Meanscoil na mBráithre.

== Sport ==
The senior hurling and football teams were crowned County Champions in 2017, the U16.5 and U15 hurling teams winning out their Munster campaigns in the school year 2017/2018 and in 2014/15 the Seniors enjoyed the same success. The basketballers were crowned Regional Cup champions in 2019/20.

The Physical Education programme includes many other strands such as soccer, gymnastics, athletics, volleyball, health related activity and the school hopes to introduce tug of war training this coming year.

== The Creative Arts ==
An annual Arts Week takes place since 2017, led by the Creative Arts Committee. Each year the school creates an event for national Culture Night. An annual Christmas Variety Show is always well attended.

The school band has been in place for over twenty years and is currently mentored by a past pupil.

Each year Transition Year students take part in Creative Engagement, which is sponsored by the National Association of Principals and Deputy Principals. Artists in residence for this programme have included Luka Bloom. Original songs have been produced each year.

== Notable alumni ==
- John Philip Holland, inventor of the first submarine, attended the school in 1858.
- Aidan McCarthy, a hurler
- The Walls
