= Holland I =

Type of prototype submarine

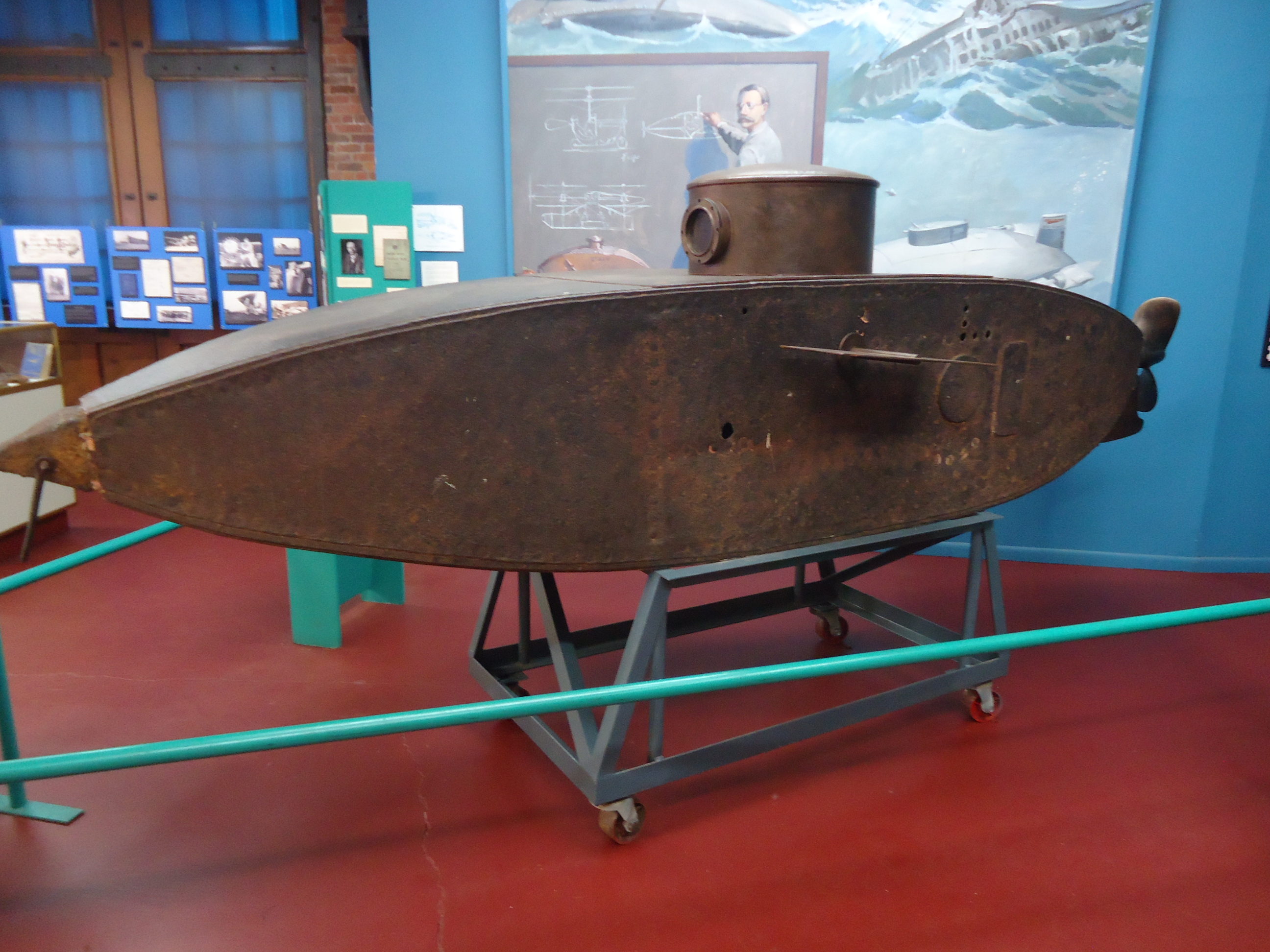

History

United States
- Name: Holland Boat No. I
- Namesake: John Philip Holland
- Launched: 22 May 1878
- Fate: Scuttled, 1878; Raised, 1927, now a museum exhibit

General characteristics
- Type: Submarine
- Displacement: 2.25 long tons (2 t)
- Length: 14 ft (4.3 m)
- Beam: 3 ft (0.91 m)
- Propulsion: 1 × 4 hp (3 kW) Brayton ready motor petroleum engine; 1 screw
- Speed: 3.5 knots (6.5 km/h; 4.0 mph)(surfaced); 2.5 miles per hour (4.0 km/h)
- Endurance: 1 hour
- Test depth: 12 ft (3.7 m)
- Crew: 1

Holland Boat No. I was a prototype submarine designed and operated by Irish marine engineer John Philip Holland.

== Construction ==
Work on the vessel began at the Albany Iron Works in New York City, moving to Paterson, New Jersey, in early 1878. The boat was launched on 22 May 1878. It was 14 feet long, weighed 2.25 tons, and was powered by a 4-horsepower Brayton Ready Motor petroleum engine driving a single screw. The boat was operated by Holland himself.

== Testing ==
After several tests, on 6 June Holland conducted his first proper trial. The boat ran on the surface at approximately 3.5 knots, then submerged to a depth of 12 feet, before eventually surfacing. However, problems with the engine, meant that Holland eventually connected the engine, by a flexible hose, to a steam engine in an accompanying launch and powered the boat externally. In a second trial, Holland remained submerged for an hour. Holland eventually stripped the boat of usable equipment and scuttled it in the Passaic River.

These trials impressed Holland's backers, the Fenian Brotherhood, who on the strength of this success financed the Holland Boat No. II, which became known as the Fenian Ram.

The vessel was recovered in 1927 and is now on display at the Paterson Museum in New Jersey.

== See also ==
- Holland Torpedo Boat Company
- Submarine Force Library and Museum
- History of submarines
- Holland II
- Holland III
- Holland IV
