= Fenian Ram =

Submarine designed for use by the Fenian Brotherhood

Coordinates: 40.91371°N 74.17923°W

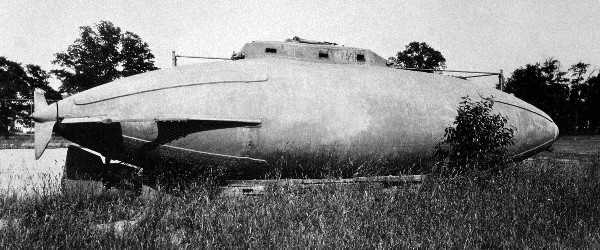
- Fenian Ram at the Clason Point Military Academy, Bronx, NY, some time between 1916 and 1927

History

United States
- Name: Holland Boat No. II
- Owner: Fenian Brotherhood
- Builder: DeLamater Iron Works, New York City for John Philip Holland
- Launched: 1881
- Nickname(s): Fenian Ram
- Status: Museum ship

General characteristics
- Type: Submarine
- Displacement: 19 long tons (19 t)
- Length: 9.4 m (30 ft 10 in)
- Beam: 1.8 m (5 ft 11 in)
- Height: 1.8 m (5 ft 11 in)
- Propulsion: 1 × 15 hp (11 kW) Brayton piston engine, single screw
- Test depth: 18 m (59 ft)
- Complement: 3 (operator, engineer, gunner)
- Armament: 1 × 9 in (230 mm) pneumatic gun

Fenian Ram is a submarine designed by John Philip Holland for use by the Fenian Brotherhood, the American counterpart to the Irish Republican Brotherhood, against the British. It was powered by a double acting Brayton Ready Motor which used kerosene fuel. It was able to dive and submerge successfully. The Ram's construction and launching in 1881 by the DeLamater Iron Company in New York was funded by the Fenians' Skirmishing Fund. Officially Holland Boat No. II, the role of the Fenians in its funding led the New York Sun newspaper to name the vessel the Fenian Ram.

== Design ==
Fenian Ram's design was partly modelled on the Whitehead torpedo, and it had similar cruciform control fins near the tail. The boat did not simply take on ballast until she sank like other contemporary submarines; she maintained a slightly positive buoyancy, and tilted her horizontal planes so that her forward motion forced her under.

Fenian Ram was armed with a 9-inch (229 mm) pneumatic gun some 11 feet (3.4 m) long, mounted along the boat's centerline and firing forward out of her bow. It operated like modern submarine torpedo tubes: a watertight bow cap was normally kept shut, allowing the 6-foot-long (1.8 m) dynamite-filled steel projectiles to be loaded into the tube from the interior of the submarine. The inner door was then shut and the outer door opened by a remote mechanism. Finally, 400 psi (2.8 MPa) air was used to shoot the projectile out of the tube. To reload, the outer door was again shut and the water in the tube was blown into the surrounding ballast tank by more compressed air. It was powered by a 15 hp (11 kW) Brayton piston engine.

== Ship history ==
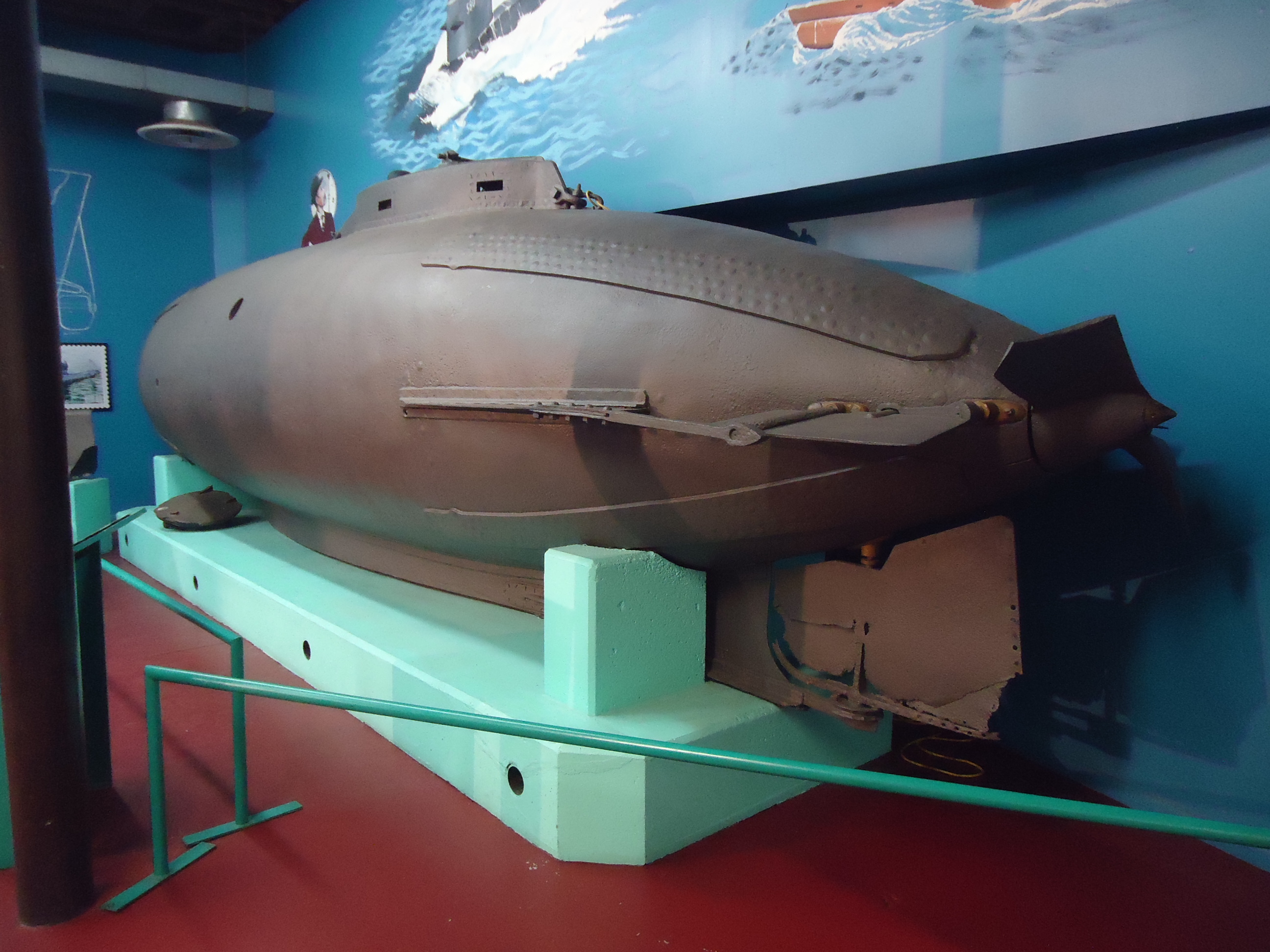
The submarine on display at the Paterson Museum, New Jersey (2016)

During extensive trials, Holland made numerous dives and test-fired the gun using dummy projectiles. However, due to funding disputes within the IRB and disagreement over payments from the IRB to Holland, the IRB stole Fenian Ram and the Holland III prototype in November 1883. Although Holland III accidentally sank in the East River, the Fenians took the Fenian Ram to New Haven, Connecticut, but discovered that no one knew how to operate it. Holland refused to help. Unable to use or sell the boat, the Brotherhood had the Ram hauled into a shed on the Mill River.

In 1916, Fenian Ram was exhibited in Madison Square Garden to raise funds for victims of the Easter Rising. Afterwards, she was moved to Clason Point Military Academy, Bronx, NY. In 1927, the Academy relocated to Long Island and the hull was sold for scrap. Prior to demolition, Irish-American activist Harry Cunningham intervened and purchased the Fenian Ram from the junkyard in order to preserve it as a symbol of Irish-American ingenuity. In September, 1927, Cunningham sold the submarine to Edward Browne of Paterson, NJ, who offered the vessel to the City of Paterson as a memorial to Holland's work. Today, she can still be seen at the Paterson Museum.

Holland started the Holland Torpedo Boat Company in 1896 after the US Navy showed interest in the design.

== Gallery ==
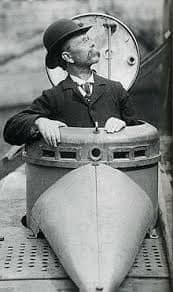

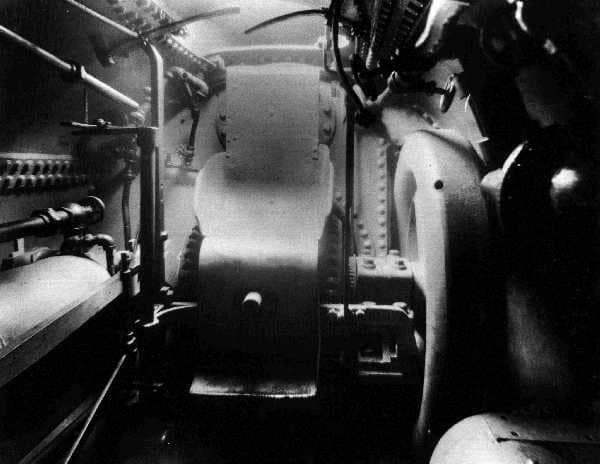

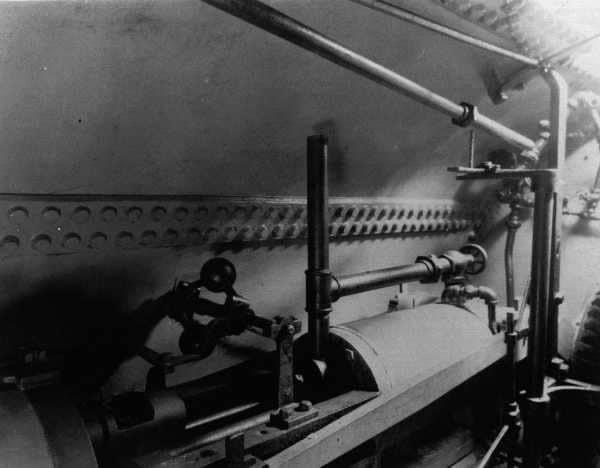

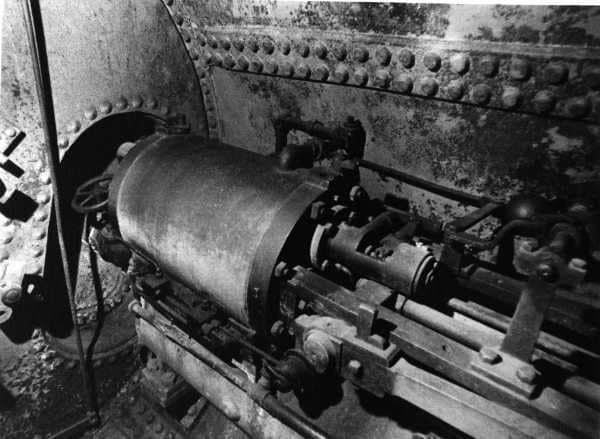

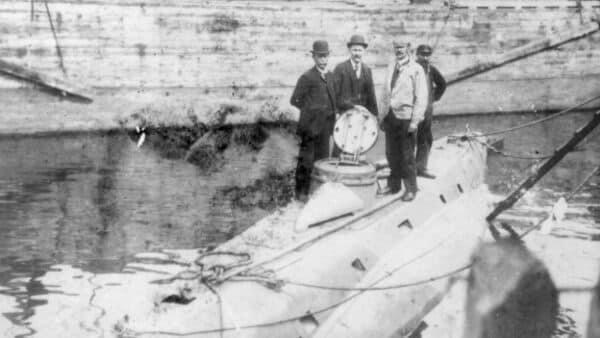

== See also ==
- History of submarines
- Holland I
- Holland III
- Holland IV

== Bibliography ==
- Gray, Paul (March 2018). "The Fenian Ram". Warship International. LV (January 2018): 31–34. ISSN 0043-0374.
