= Fort Lafayette =

Former island fortification in the Narrows of New York Harbor

- Hendricks Reef, offshore of Long Island, New York City, (borough of Brooklyn / Kings County), New York
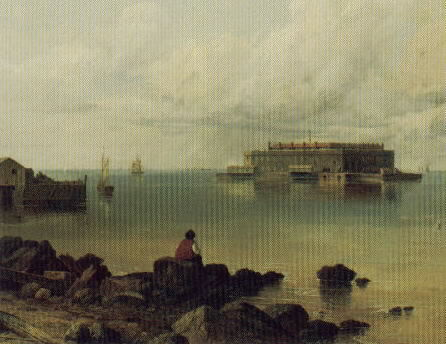
- Fort Lafayette, seen from the Brooklyn / Long Island / east shore with Denyse's Wharf to the left

Location
- Location within New York City Location within New York Location within the United States
- Coordinates: 40°36′30″N 74°02′19″W

Site history
- Built: 1815–1822
- Built by: United States Army / United States Army Corps of Engineers
- In use: 1822–1946 (ammunition storage after 1897)
- Materials: sandstone, brick, mortar, iron
- Fate: demolished 1960

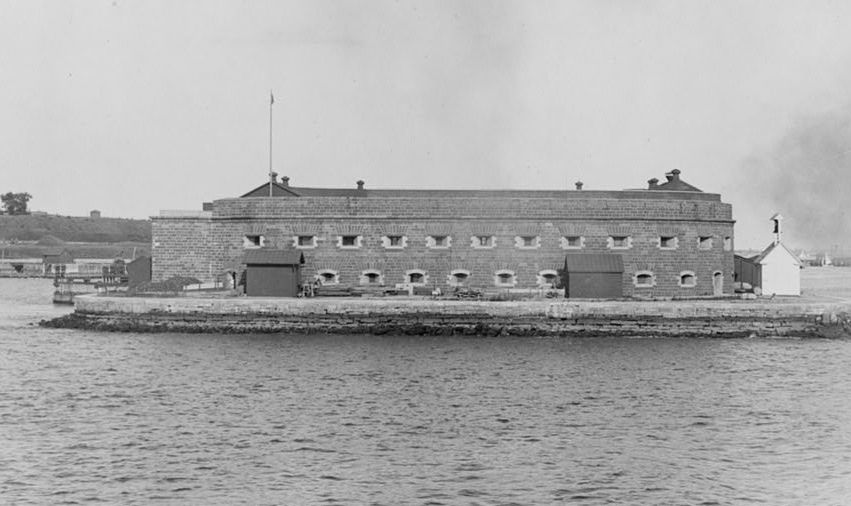
Fort Lafayette in 1904

Fort Lafayette was an island coastal fortification in The Narrows of New York Harbor (New York Bay), built offshore from nearby Fort Hamilton at the southern tip of what is now the Bay Ridge neighborhood in the New York City borough of Brooklyn at the western end of Long Island. The fort was built on a natural off-shore island shoal, known as Hendrick's Reef. Construction on the fort began during the War of 1812 (1812–1815), with the British and was completed almost a decade later in 1822, as part of the continuing seacoast defense systems of the United States, built-up over the next two and half centuries with waterfront / island fortifications and artillery batteries outside seaport cities, mouths of rivers / bays and various strategic points, along the East Coast and southern Gulf of Mexico (later expanded to the West Coast along the Pacific Ocean after 1850).

The fort, originally named Fort Diamond after its shape, was renamed to celebrate the Marquis de La Fayette (1757–1834), of France, a hero of the American Revolutionary War (1775–1783), (commissioned a General in the Continental Army aide to commanding General George Washington and veteran of numerous battles), who would soon four decades later, commence a famous long sojourning visit and grand tour of the enlarged United States during 1824–1825.

A half-century later, during the American Civil War (1861–1865), the island New York fort became a prison, mostly for civilians viewed as disloyal to the federal Union; the fort became known as the "American Bastille" (along with Fortress Monroe in the Hampton Roads harbor of Virginia, Fort McHenry of Baltimore, Fort Warren outside Boston in Boston Harbor, and Fort Delaware, below Philadelphia and Wilmington in the Delaware River and Bay).

The historic fort for greater New York was modified several times in subsequent decades and wars by the United States Department of War and its United States Army with additional armaments and improvements, but was unfortunately one of the few American historical coastal forts / batteries to be demolished 145 years later in 1960, to make room for the construction of the Verrazzano–Narrows Bridge; the eastern (Brooklyn / Long Island-side) bridge suspension tower now occupies the Lafayette fort's former foundation site.

== Construction ==
Fort Lafayette was in the form of a square set on end, hence its first name of "Fort Diamond". It held approximately 72 cannon (references vary) in three tiers, two in casemates and one in barbette mountings on the roof. The design allowed all the cannon in the southwest front to engage any attacking enemy ships entering the Narrows from the south in the Atlantic Ocean, with the northwest front also engaging if ships passed the fort. The fort was designed, after the experiences of the American Revolutionary War (1775–1783), resulting in the First System of American seacoast defense in the later independence era of the 1780s and 1790s at the end of the 18th century.

The Second System of U.S. defensive seacoast fortifications and batteries following 1800 in the decades of the early 19th century, and is not fully characteristic of either the later completed Second System or the following Third System which followed the lessons learned in the War of 1812 (1812–1815) and parallel Napoleonic Wars in Europe, up to the mid-1800s and the ensuing conflict of the American Civil War (1861–1865).

The fort was built of sandstone, brick and mortar walls. The fort was, however, vulnerable to bombardment and attack from its landward side on the east of Brooklyn / Long Island, and so nearby Fort Hamilton was subsequently built a decade later, circa 1830 to guard against and prevent this weakness. In the following 1840s, as a then captain in the United States Army Corps of Engineers, the future famous military officer and Confederate States Army General Robert E. Lee (1807–1870), worked on repairs and improvements to the New York fort, along with several others on the Atlantic Ocean coast.

== Civil War prison ==
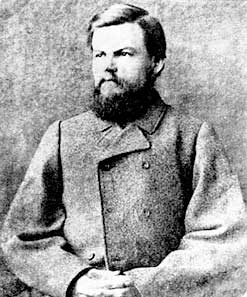
Robert Cobb Kennedy, hanged at Fort Lafayette for arson, 1865

Before 1861, the fort's 72 heavy cannon commanded the primary approaches to the harbor, but during the Civil War, the casemates were used to house Confederate prisoners of war and politicians opposed to the administration's policies, detained under Abraham Lincoln's selective suspension of the writ of habeas corpus. Fort Lafayette came to be known as the "American Bastille" to some.

Robert Cobb Kennedy, formerly a captain in the 1st Louisiana Regular Infantry (CSA), was one of the Confederate conspirators in the plot to burn New York on Thanksgiving Day, November 25, 1864, and was the only one caught. He was imprisoned, court-martialed, and hanged at the fort on March 25, 1865. The plot to burn New York was in retaliation for Sherman burning Atlanta. Several hotels and P. T. Barnum's museum were set on fire.

Francis Key Howard, grandson of Francis Scott Key, was a newspaper editor of the Baltimore Exchange, a newspaper sympathetic to the southern cause. He was arrested on September 13, 1861, by U.S. Major General Nathaniel Prentice Banks on the direct orders of General George B. McClellan, enforcing the policy of President Abraham Lincoln. The basis of his arrest was for writing a critical editorial in his newspaper on Lincoln's suspension of the writ of habeas corpus, and the fact that the Lincoln administration had declared martial law in Baltimore and imprisoned numerous persons without due process, including George William Brown, mayor of Baltimore, Congressman Henry May, the police commissioners of Baltimore, and the entire city council. Howard was then transferred to Fort Lafayette and from there to Fort Warren in Boston harbor.

== Later use ==
Rebuilt after a catastrophic fire in 1868, the fort was used in 1883 by Edmund Zalinski for experiments with his dynamite gun, which was briefly adopted by both the US Army and US Navy. The fort was used by the Navy for ammunition storage and transfer from 1898 to 1946. It was demolished in 1960 when the island was used for the base of the Brooklyn tower of the Verrazzano–Narrows Bridge.
