= USS Holland (SS-1) =

Submarine of the United States

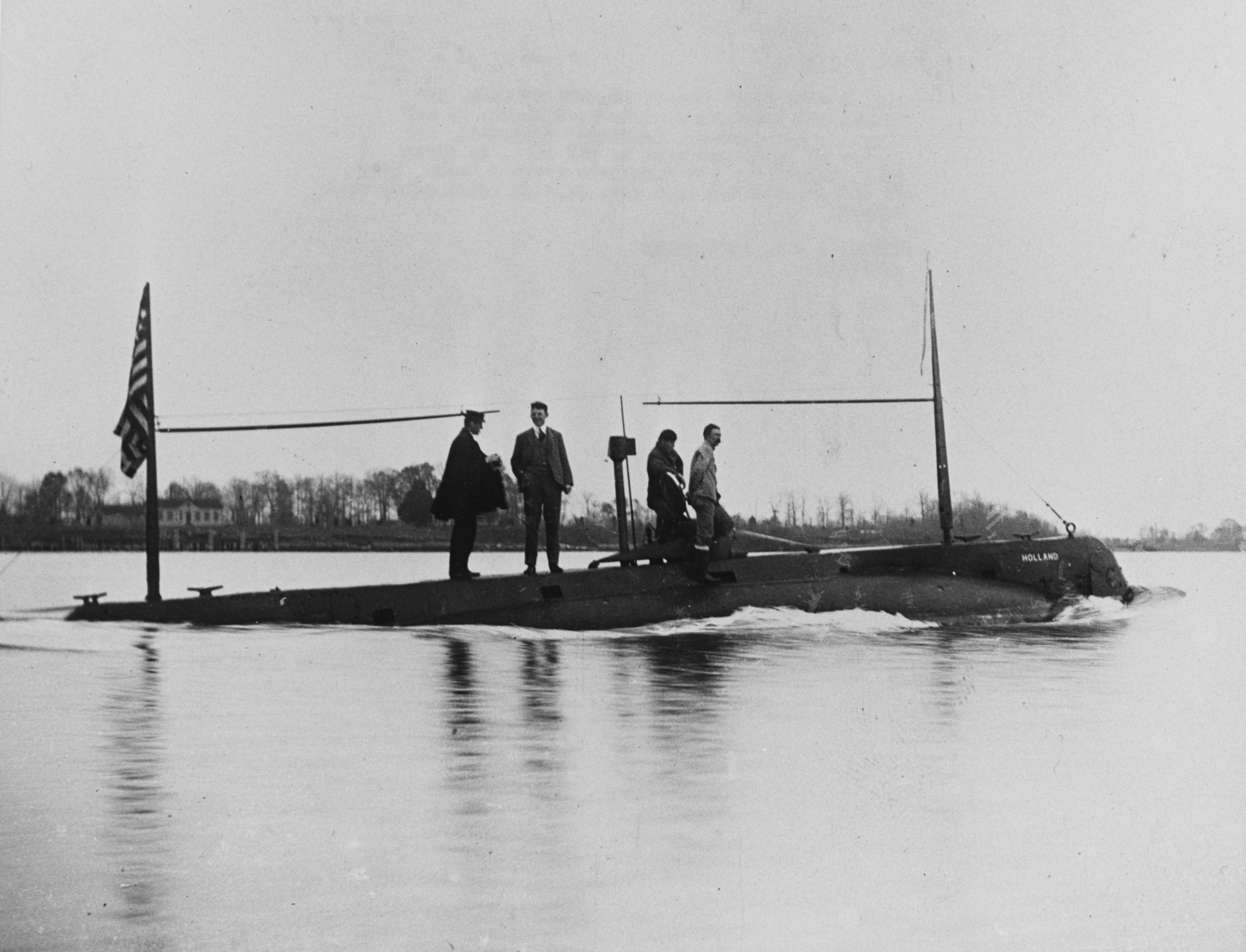
- USS Holland (SS-1) under way

Class overview
- Operators: United States Navy
- Preceded by: none
- Succeeded by: Plunger class

History

United States
- Name: Holland VI (1897–1900); Holland (1900–)
- Namesake: John Philip Holland
- Builder: Crescent Shipyard, Elizabeth, New Jersey
- Laid down: November 1896
- Launched: 17 May 1897
- Acquired: 11 April 1900
- Commissioned: 12 October 1900
- Decommissioned: 17 July 1905
- Stricken: 21 November 1910
- Identification: Hull symbol: SS-1 (15 July 1920); Call sign: NHB
- Fate: Sold 18 June 1913; on display in a park in Paterson, New Jersey, until sold for scrap, 1932

General characteristics
- Class & type: Holland-class submarine
- Displacement: 64 long tons (65 t) surfaced; 74 long tons (75 t) submerged
- Length: 63 ft 10 in (19.46 m) LOA
- Beam: 10 ft 4 in (3.15 m) extreme
- Draft: 8 ft 6 in (2.59 m)
- Installed power: 45 bhp (34 kW) surfaced; 55 bhp (41 kW) submerged
- Propulsion: 1 × Otto Gas Engine Works gas engine; 1 × Electro Dynamic electric motor; 66-cell battery; 1 × shaft
- Speed: 6 knots (11 km/h; 6.9 mph) surfaced; 5.5 knots (10.2 km/h; 6.3 mph) submerged
- Range: 200 nmi (370 km; 230 mi) at 6 kn (11 km/h; 6.9 mph) surfaced; 30 nmi (56 km; 35 mi) at 5.5 kn (10.2 km/h; 6.3 mph) submerged
- Test depth: 100 ft (30 m)
- Complement: 7
- Armament: 1 × 17.7 in (450 mm) "18-in" torpedo tube (3 torpedoes); 1 × 8 in (200 mm) dynamite gun

USS Holland (SS-1) was the United States Navy's first submarine, although not its first underwater watercraft, which was the 1775 submersible Turtle.

== Design and construction ==
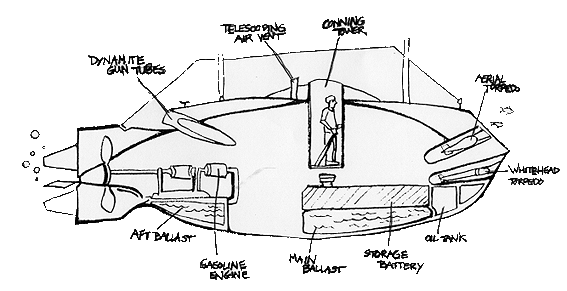
Rough sketch of Holland (not to scale: Length 64' Beam 10')

The boat was originally laid down as Holland VI at the Crescent Shipyard, in Elizabeth, New Jersey, for John Philip Holland's, Holland Torpedo Boat Company. She was launched on 17 May 1897. She was acquired by the US Navy, on 11 April 1900, and commissioned, on 12 October 1900.

Holland was built at former Navy Lieutenant Lewis Nixon's Crescent Shipyard, of Elizabeth, New Jersey for John Holland's Holland Torpedo Boat Company, which became the Electric Boat company in 1899. The vessel was built under the supervision of John Philip Holland, who designed the vessel and her details. Holland's keel was laid at Nixon's Crescent Shipyard with both men present. The two men worked together using many of John Holland's proven concepts and patents to make the submarine a reality, each man complementing the other's contributions to the development of the modern submarine. John Holland was the inventor for US Patent 702,729 for the design of a submarine boat. Testing and training first took place at the Holland Torpedo Boat Station from 1899 to 1900. Important contributions were also made by Arthur L. Busch (or Du Busc), Crescent's superintendent.

Holland VI included many features that submarines of the early 20th century would exhibit, albeit in later, more advanced forms. There was a conning tower from which the boat, and her weapons, could be directed. Also, she had all the necessary ballast and trim tanks to make precise changes in depth and attitude underwater. Her crew was six men and maximum diving depth was 75 feet (23 m).

For armament, she had a reloadable 18-inch (450 mm) torpedo tube with three Whitehead Mark 2 torpedoes and an 8.425 in (214.0 mm) pneumatic dynamite gun in the bow (the dynamite gun's projectiles were called "aerial torpedoes"). A second dynamite gun in the stern was removed in 1900, to make room for an improved engine exhaust, prior to delivery to the Navy.

She had both an internal combustion engine (specifically, a 4-stroke Otto gasoline engine of 45 bhp (34 kW)) for running on the surface and charging batteries, and an Electro Dynamic electric motor of 50 shp (37 kW) for submerged operation, with one shaft. A 66-cell Exide battery powered the electric motor when submerged. This allowed speeds of 6 kn (11 km/h; 6.9 mph) surfaced and 5.5 kn (10.2 km/h; 6.3 mph) submerged. Surfaced range was 200 nmi (370 km; 230 mi) at 6 knots, while submerged range was 30 nmi (56 km; 35 mi) at 5.5 kn (10.2 km/h; 6.3 mph). There is significant variation in references as to the vessel's horsepower and speed, for example, the Register of Ships of the U. S. Navy gives horsepower figures of 45 bhp (34 kW) surfaced and 75 shp (56 kW) submerged, with 8 kn (15 km/h; 9.2 mph) surfaced and 5 kn (9.3 km/h; 5.8 mph) submerged.

== Service history ==
Holland VI eventually proved her worthiness as a warship and was ultimately purchased by the US government for the sum of $150,000, on 11 April 1900. She was considered by many of the armies and navies of nations to be a very successful submarine, especially because of the technology used by her. The United States Government soon ordered more submarines from Holland's company, which were to be known as the Plunger class. These became America's first fleet of underwater naval vessels.

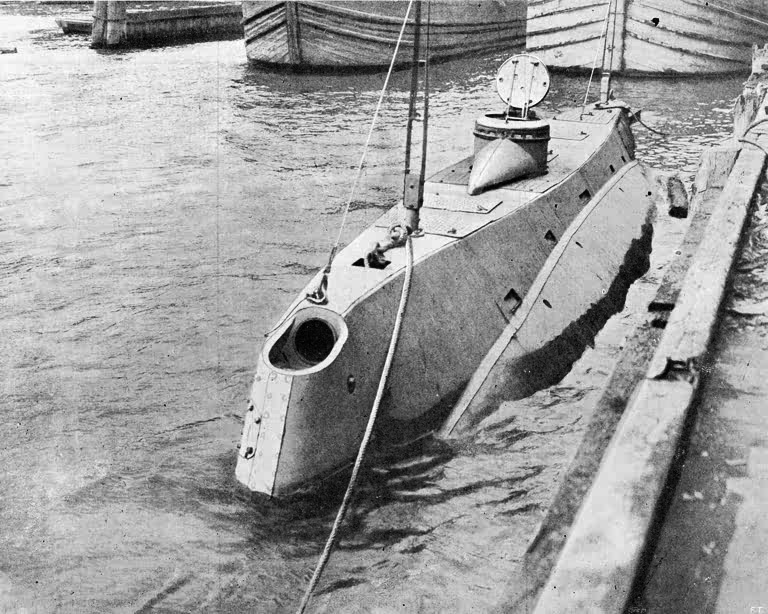
USS Holland (SS-1) from Scientific American 1898. The muzzle door of the bow dynamite gun is open.

Holland VI was modified after her christening, and was renamed United States Submarine Torpedo Boat Holland (Submarine-1) when she was commissioned by the US Navy on 12 October 1900, at Newport, Rhode Island.

During her commissioned life in the Navy, Holland did not carry the hull designation SS-1. The designation system currently in use was placed into Naval Regulations, on 17 July 1920. Holland would never been referred to as SS-1, while in service, she would have been designated Submarine-1, or simply S-1, under the system in place between 1895 and 1920. Most historians, including official Navy sources, have retroactively applied both the prefix USS and the designation SS-1 to avoid confusion.

Holland was the first commissioned submarine in the US Navyand is the first of the unbroken line of submarines in the Navy. She was the fourth submarine to be owned by the Navy, however. The first submarine was Propeller (also known as Alligator), the second was Intelligent Whale and the third was Plunger, an experimental submarine, built in 1895, which is not to be confused with Plunger (SS-2).

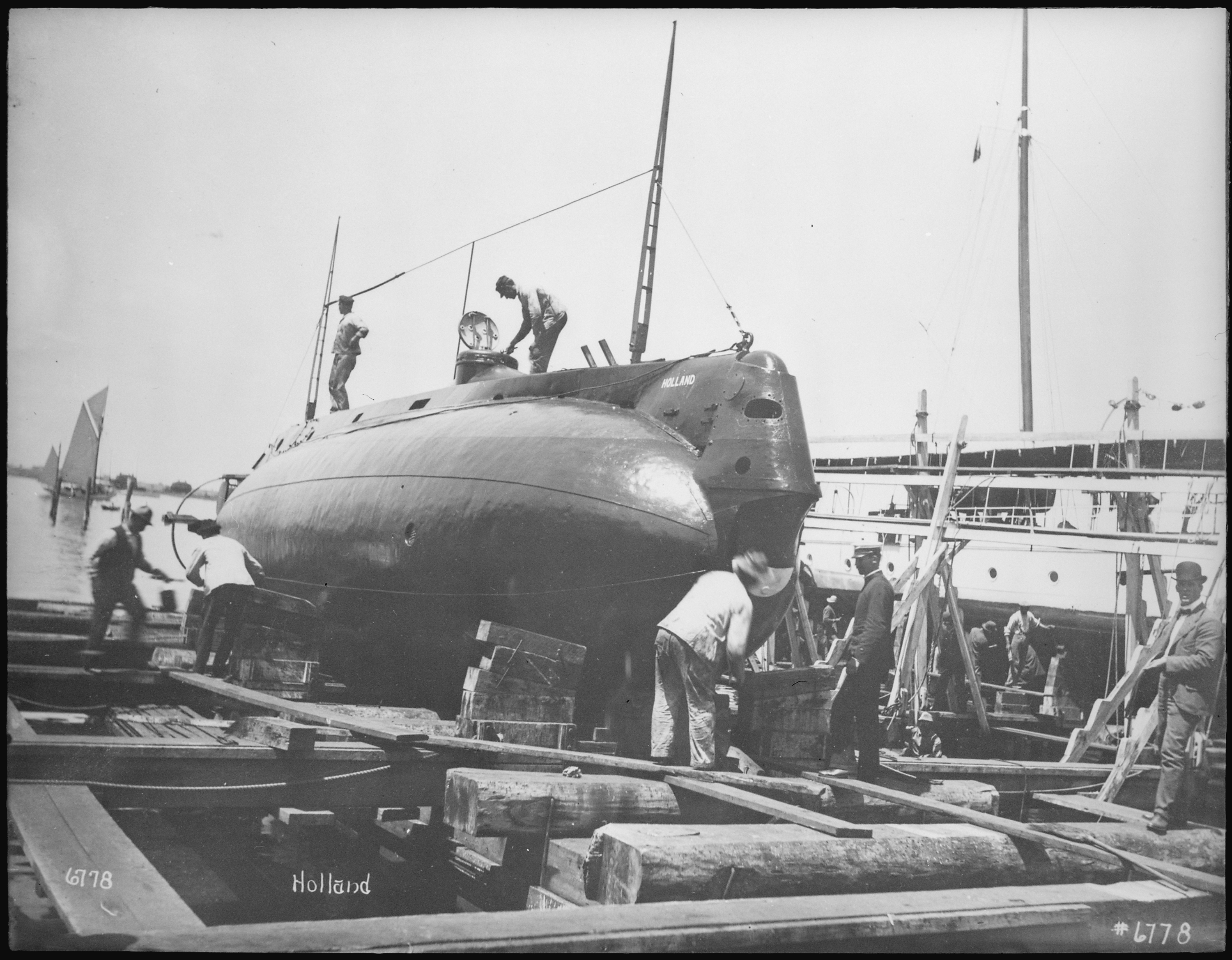
Holland under construction, 1900

On 16 October 1900, in order to be kept serviceable throughout the winter, Holland left Newport, under tow of the tug Leyden for Annapolis, Maryland, where she was used to train midshipmen of the United States Naval Academy, as well as officers and enlisted men ordered there to receive training vital in preparing for the operation of other submarines being built for the Fleet.

Holland proved valuable for experimental purposes in collecting data for submarines under construction or contemplation. Her 166 nmi (307 km; 191 mi) surface run, from Annapolis to Norfolk, from 8–10 January 1901, provided useful data on her performance underway over an extended period.

Holland, briefly in 1899, on trials, and five Plunger-class Holland-type submarines, were based in New Suffolk, New York, on the North Fork of Long Island, from 1899 to 1905, prompting the hamlet to claim to be the first submarine base in the United States.

Except for the period from 15 June to 1 October 1901, which was passed training cadets at the Naval Torpedo Station, Newport, Rhode Island, Holland remained at Annapolis, as a training submarine until 17 July 1905, when she was decommissioned.

== Fate ==
Holland finished her career in reserve at Norfolk. Her name was struck from the Naval Vessel Register on 21 November 1910. This revolutionary submarine was sold as scrap to Henry A. Hitner & Sons, of Philadelphia, on 18 June 1913, for $100. Her purchaser was required to put up $5,000 bond as assurance that the submarine would be broken up and not used as a ship.

About 1915, the hulk of Holland, stripped of her external fittings, was sold to Peter J. Gibbons. As of October 1916, she was on display in Philadelphia. In May 1917, she was moved to the Bronx, New York, as a featured attraction at the Bronx International Exposition of Science, Arts and Industries.

Holland was on display for several years in Paterson, New Jersey, until in 1930, she was sold as scrap to the Brooklyn Navy yard, and in 1932 was scrapped.

== See also ==
- History of submarines
- Plunger (1897)
- Holland-class submarine
- Submarines of the Imperial Japanese Navy
- Gustave Zédé

== Bibliography ==
- "Holland I (Submarine No. 1)". Dictionary of American Naval Fighting Ships. Naval History and Heritage Command. 10 September 2024. This article incorporates text from this source, which is in the public domain.
- Mohl, Michael. "Holland (SS-1)". Navsource.net.
- Bauer, K. Jack; Roberts, Stephen S. (1991). Register of Ships of the U.S. Navy, 1775-1990: Major Combatants. Westport, Connecticut: Greenwood Press. ISBN 0-313-26202-0.
- Friedman, Norman (1995). U.S. Submarines Through 1945: An Illustrated Design History. Annapolis, Maryland: Naval Institute Press. pp. 285–304. ISBN 1-55750-263-3.
- "Crescent Shipyard". GlobalSecurity.org.
- Gardiner, Robert; Gray, Randal (1985). Conway's All the World's Fighting Ships 1906-1921. London: Conway Maritime Press. ISBN 0-85177-245-5.
- Morris, Richard Knowles (1998). John P. Holland, 1841–1914: Inventor of the Modern Submarine. University of South Carolina Press. ISBN 978-1-57003-236-3.
- Holland, John Philip (5 October 1900). "Patent US702729A (Submarine boat.)".
- Derdahl, Guy; DiGiulian, Tony (21 August 2025). "USN Ship Designations". NavWeaps.
- "History of Cutchogue-New Suffolk". cutchoguenewsuffolk.org. Archived from the original on 29 April 2006.
- Whelan, Jeff (12 April 2000). "The 'silent service" began in Elizabeth". The Star-Ledger. p. 57.
