= Holland III =

1883 American submarine prototype

History
- Name: Holland III
- Namesake: John Philip Holland
- Builder: John Holland, Jersey City
- Launched: 1883
- Fate: Sunk in the East River, November 1883

General characteristics
- Displacement: 1 t (1.1 tons)
- Length: 16 ft 4 in (4.98 m)
- Beam: 2 ft 4 in (0.71 m)
- Draft: 2 ft 4 in (0.71 m)

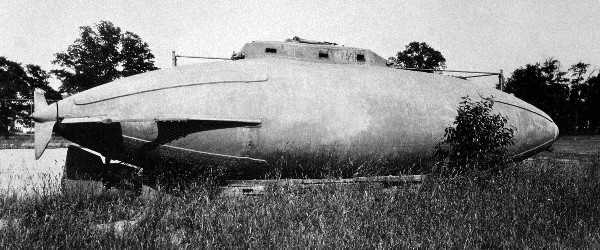
Photo of the Fenian Ram, the Holland III was a scaled-down version of the Fenian Ram

The Holland III was an early prototype submarine made by John Holland. The 16-foot 1-ton model was a scaled-down version of the Fenian Ram intended for experiments to help him improve navigation.

In a dispute over money, the prototype was stolen from its slip in the Morris Canal Basin, on the Hudson River in Jersey City, New Jersey, by members of the Fenian Brotherhood in November, 1883. The theft also included the Fenian Ram, a successful submarine they had commissioned. The Fenian Brotherhood took the two stolen submarines up the East River in New York City. The Fenian Ram was tied to their boat, and the Holland III was tied to the Ram. Near Whitestone Point in Queens, New York, the Holland III started to take on water through her turret, causing her to slow down, stretching and subsequently breaking the rope between it and the Fenian Ram. The prototype soon sank in 110 feet of water, and has not been recovered, despite efforts, most recently by the National Underwater and Marine Agency.

The Fenians had been planning to use it to fight Britain for the independence of Ireland.

== See also ==
- Holland Torpedo Boat Company
- Submarine Force Library and Museum
- History of submarines
- Holland I
- Holland II
- Holland IV
