= Henryk Żaliński =

Polish historian

- Born: 9 December 1938 (age 87); Działoszyce, Poland
- Education: Pedagogical University of Cracow
- Occupation: Historian

Henryk Żaliński (born 9 December 1938 in Działoszyce) is a Polish historian, professor at the Pedagogical University of Cracow. He is specializing in the history of Poland in the 19th century.

He graduated from the National Higher College of Teacher Training in Cracow (now Pedagogical University of Cracow). He passed his habilitation in 1991. On 25 September 2009 he gained the title of professor.

== Works ==
- Kształt polityczny Polski w ideologii Towarzystwa Demokratycznego Polskiego (1832-1946) (1976)
- Stracone szanse : Wielka Emigracja o powstaniu listopadowym (1982)
- Poglądy Hotelu Lambert na kształt powstania zbrojnego 1832-1846 (1990)
- Kraj, emigracja, niepodległość: studia i szkice (2006)
