= Dynamite gun =

Class of artillery pieces (1883- c. 1904)

A dynamite gun is any of a class of artillery pieces that use compressed air to propel an explosive projectile (such as one containing dynamite). Dynamite guns were in use for a brief period from the 1880s to the beginning of the twentieth century.

Because of the instability of early high explosives, it was impractical to fire an explosive-filled shell from a conventional explosive-fired gun. The violent deflagration of the propellant charge and the sudden acceleration of the shell would set off the explosive in the barrel of the weapon. By using compressed air, the dynamite gun was able to accelerate the projectile more gradually through the length of the barrel.

Guns for naval use were supplied with air from shipboard compressors. A small model for field use by land forces employed a powder charge to drive a piston down a cylinder, compressing air that was then fed into the gun barrel. This field model was famously used by Theodore Roosevelt's Rough Riders during the Spanish–American War, but had actually been used previously by Cuban insurgents against Spanish forces.

The guns fired a relatively lightweight shell; necessarily the guns had a low muzzle velocity, requiring a high angle of fire even at short ranges. This increased the flight time of the shell, resulting in a loss of accuracy.

By 1900, the availability of stable high explosives, the longer range of conventional artillery, the gun's mechanical complexity, and its inherent limitations made the dynamite gun obsolete.

== History ==
=== The Zalinski dynamite gun ===
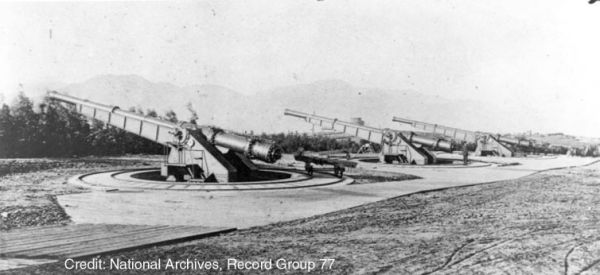
Zalinski guns at Battery Dynamite, Fort Winfield Scott, San Francisco

The original invention of a gun to fire an explosive charge with compressed air was the work of D. M. Medford of Chicago, Illinois. His prototype was demonstrated in 1883 at Fort Hamilton, New York. Edmund Zalinski, an American artillery officer, saw the demonstration, and over the next few years improved the design, building and demonstrating a series of prototypes. Some of his work took place at Fort Lafayette, New York.

The Navy was impressed, and commissioned the construction of a specialized "dynamite gun cruiser." The USS Vesuvius, launched in 1888, was armed with three fifteen-inch pneumatic guns capable of firing an explosive projectile 1.5 miles (2.4 km), and eventually bombarded Cuba in the Spanish–American War. The projectiles were sometimes called "aerial torpedoes".

In 1897, an 8.4-inch (210 mm) Zalinski dynamite gun was fitted to the first commissioned US submarine USS Holland (SS-1). It was later removed in 1900.

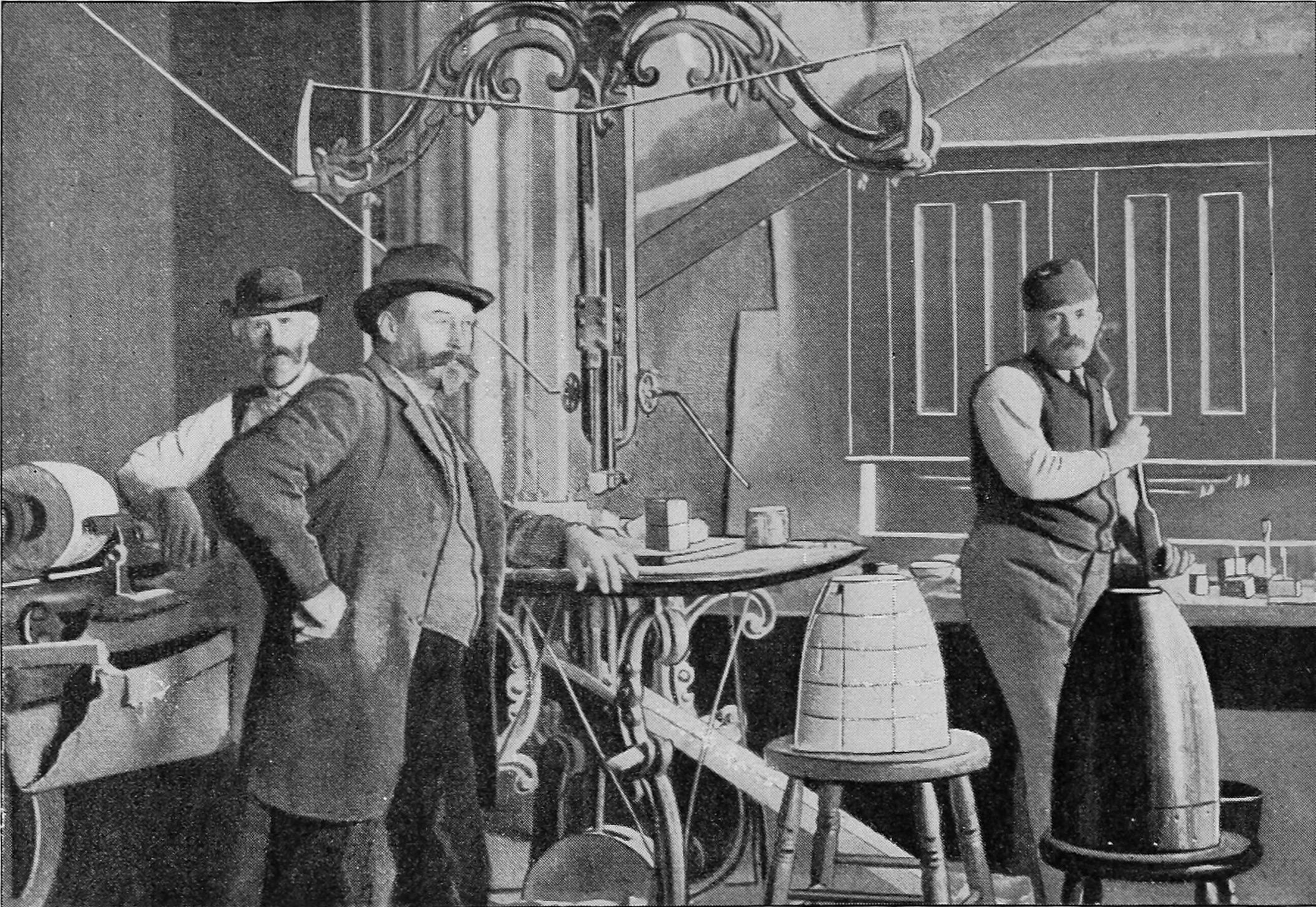
Filling 15" Zalinski brass shells with hand-shaped gun-cotton blocks

From 1894 to 1901, the Army purchased and installed several coastal artillery batteries of 15 inch (381 mm) dynamite guns as part of the coast defense modernization program initiated by the Endicott Board. These could throw an explosive projectile from 2,000 to 5,000 yards (1,800 to 4,600 m) depending on the weight of the projectile, from 500 to 50 pounds (227 to 23 kg). Compressed air at 2,500 psi (17 MPa) was supplied by a steam-driven compressor. In addition to the guns and their ammunition, the steam boiler, compressor, and other equipment necessary to operate the guns weighed over 200 tons. Among other locations, three guns were installed as Battery Dynamite at Fort Winfield Scott, near the Presidio of San Francisco. In 1904 the batteries were decommissioned, and the guns dismounted and scrapped. A bolt circle for a 15-inch dynamite gun remains near the southwest tip of Fisher's Island, New York on the former site of Fort H. G. Wright.

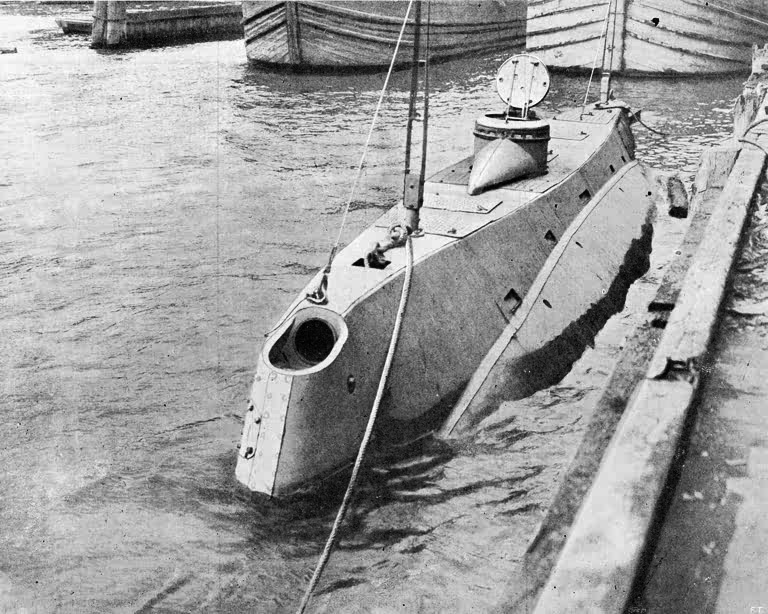
USS Holland at the Holland Torpedo Boat Station in 1898. The muzzle door of the bow dynamite gun is open.

=== The Sims-Dudley dynamite gun ===
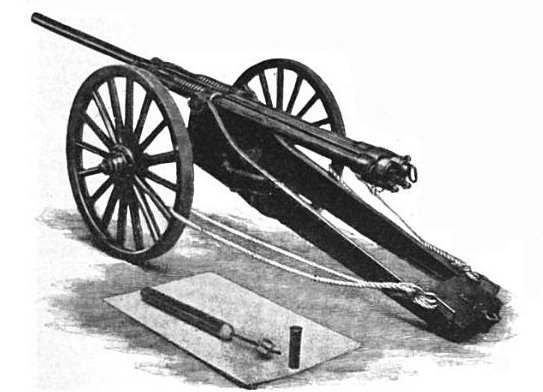
Sims-Dudley 4 Inch Dynamite Gun on Field Mount

Pneumatic guns for shipboard use, or at fixed coastal fortifications, could rely on a steam-driven gas compressor as an air source. For use by troops in the field, this was impractical. The Dudley-Sims dynamite gun used a smokeless powder charge to compress the air. Beneath the gun barrel was a cylinder into which the powder charge was loaded. When fired, the expanding gas from the smokeless powder compressed the air in the cylinder, which was then fed into the gun barrel, accelerating the explosive projectile. The US Army bought sixteen of these guns.

The Sims-Dudley gun weighed about one thousand pounds and had a bore diameter of 2.5 inches (6.4 cm). Its ammunition was not actually dynamite; the shells were filled with a nitrocellulose-based gelatin, and exploded by either a time or percussion fuze. Each round of ammunition weighed about 10 pounds (4.5 kg), 5 pounds (2.3 kg) of which was the explosive filler. It was cylindrical in shape, with a rounded nose, with twisted vanes on its back to provide spin-stabilization during flight.

Roosevelt and his Rough Riders used a Sims-Dudley gun during the siege of Santiago, with mixed results. The gun did work as intended, delivering high-explosive shells on target. Because of its relatively quiet pneumatic operation and smokeless powder charges, it did not betray its presence, and so was not targeted by the Spanish. But it was mechanically unreliable and not very accurate. On balance Roosevelt was not enthusiastic, but found it "more effective than the regular artillery."

== See also ==
- Pneumatic weapon
- Dale Fort
- Air gun
- Spud gun
- FN 303
- Holman Projector
- Steam cannon

== Bibliography ==
- Hansen, David M. "Zalinski's Dynamite Gun." Technology and Culture, 25 Apr 1984
