= John Philip Holland =

Irish-American marine engineer (1841–1914)

- Seán Pilib Ó hUallacháin
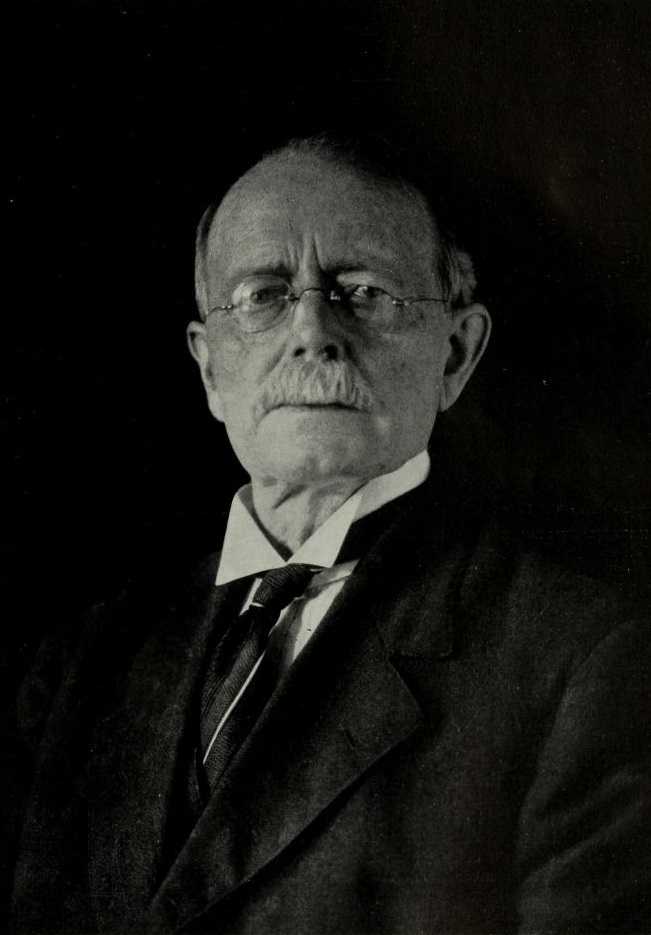
- Born: February 24, 1841; Liscannor, County Clare, Ireland
- Died: August 12, 1914 (aged 73); Newark, New Jersey, U.S.
- Resting place: Holy Sepulchre Cemetery, Totowa, New Jersey
- Education: C.B.S. Secondary School Ennistymon
- Years active: 1878–1914
- Notable work: Holland VI; Holland 1
- Engineering career
- Discipline: Marine engineering
- Employer: Holland Torpedo Boat Company
- Projects: Holland I; Holland II; Holland III; Holland IV; USS Plunger
- Significant advance: Submarine
- Awards: Engineering Heritage Award (2011)

John Philip Holland (Irish: Seán Pilib Ó hUallacháin/Ó Maolchalann; February 24, 1841 – August 12, 1914) was an Irish-American marine engineer who developed the first submarine to be formally commissioned by the US Navy, USS Holland (SS-1) and the first Royal Navy submarine, Holland 1.

== Early life ==
Holland, the second of four siblings, all boys, was born in a coastguard cottage in Liscannor, County Clare, Ireland where his father, John Sr., was a member of the Royal Coastguard Service. His mother, a native Irish speaker from Liscannor, Máire Ní Scannláin (aka Mary Scanlan), was John Holland's second wife; his first, Anne Foley Holland, believed to be a native of Kilkee, died in 1835. The area was heavily Irish-speaking and Holland learned English properly only when he attended the local English-speaking St Macreehy's National School, and from 1858, Irish Christian Brothers school in Ennistymon.

Holland joined the Irish Christian Brothers in Limerick and taught in Limerick (CBS Sexton Street) and many other centres in the country including North Monastery CBS in Cork City, St. Mary's CBS, Portlaoise, St Joseph's CBS (Drogheda) and as the first Mathematics teacher in Colaiste Ris (also Dundalk). Due to ill health, he left the Christian Brothers in 1873. Holland migrated to the United States in 1873. Initially working for an engineering firm, he returned to teaching again for a further six years at St. John's Catholic school in Paterson, New Jersey.

== Development of submarine designs ==
After his arrival in the United States, Holland slipped and fell on an icy Boston street and broke a leg. While recuperating from the injury in a hospital, he used his time to refine his submarine designs and was encouraged by Isaac Whelan, a priest.

In 1875, his submarine designs were submitted for consideration by the US Navy but were turned down as unworkable. The Fenians (Irish revolutionaries), however, continued to fund Holland's research and development expenses at a level that allowed him to resign from his teaching post. In 1878 he demonstrated the Holland I prototype. In 1881, Fenian Ram was launched but, soon after, Holland and the Fenians parted company on bad terms over the issue of payment within the Fenian organisation, and between the Fenians and Holland. The submarine is now preserved at Paterson Museum, New Jersey.

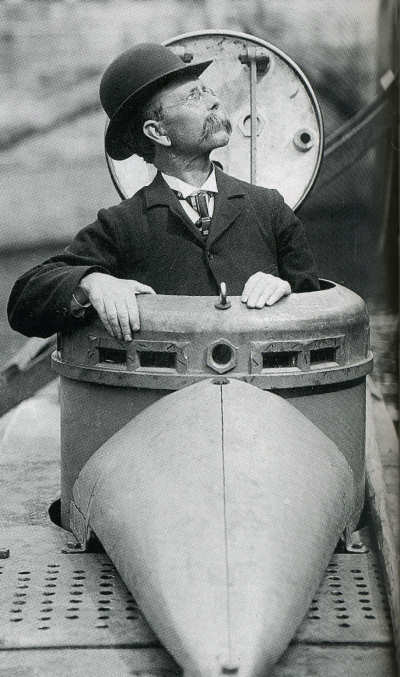
Holland stands in the hatch of a submarine

Holland continued to improve his designs and worked on several experimental boats that were not accepted by the US Navy and founded the Holland Torpedo Boat Company in 1896. He was eventually successful with a privately built type initially named Holland VI, launched on 17 May 1897. This was the first submarine to have power to run submerged for any considerable distance, and the first to combine electric motors for submerged travel and gasoline engines for use on the surface. She was purchased by the US Navy, on 11 April 1900, after rigorous tests and was commissioned on 12 October 1900 as USS Holland. Seven more of her type were ordered, with five built at the Crescent Shipyard in Elizabeth, New Jersey, and two built at Union Iron Works in California. The company that emerged from these developments was called The Electric Boat Company, founded on 7 February 1899. Isaac Leopold Rice became the company's first president, with Elihu B. Frost acting as vice-president and chief financial officer. This company eventually evolved into the major defence contractor General Dynamics.

The USS Holland design was also adopted by others, including the Royal Navy in developing the Holland-class submarine. The first five submarines of the Imperial Japanese Navy used a modified version of the basic design, although these boats were at least 10 feet longer, at about 63 feet. These submarines were also developed at the Fore River Ship and Engine Company in Quincy, Massachusetts. Holland also designed the Holland II and Holland III prototypes. The Royal Navy 'Holland 1' is on display at the Submarine Museum, Gosport, England.

== Death ==
After spending 56 of his 73 years working with submersibles, John Philip Holland died on 12 August 1914, in Newark, New Jersey. He is interred at the Holy Sepulchre Cemetery in Totowa, New Jersey.

== Memorial ==
A monument stands at the gates of Scholars Townhouse Hotel, Drogheda (the former building of the Christian Brothers school where Holland taught) in commemoration of his work. It was unveiled in a ceremony on 14 June 2014 as part of the Irish Maritime Festival. The ceremony was attended by Drogheda Town Council as well as representatives of the US, British and Japanese governments. St. Josephs' Christian Brothers School, where Holland once taught, has been renamed and operates as John P. Holland Charter School in Paterson, New Jersey.

The John P. Holland Centre, a centre dedicated to the life and work of Holland, was opened in 2016 in Liscannor, County Clare.

== Submarines designed by John P. Holland ==
- Holland I – A small unarmed submersible. Now on display at the Paterson Museum.
- Holland II (named Fenian Ram) – Built for Irish revolutionaries; now on display at the Paterson Museum.
- Holland III – Scaled down version of Fenian Ram used for navigation tests.
- Holland IV (known as the Zalinski Boat) – experimental submarine financed by US Army Lieutenant Edmund Zalinski.
- Holland V (named Plunger) – Prototype used to demonstrate the potential of submarines for naval warfare. Launched in 1897 and trialled but was not accepted as an experimental submarine by the US Navy. Returned to the Holland Company in 1903 and scrapped in 1917.
- Holland VI – First modern submarine in the United States Navy built by the Holland Torpedo Boat Company. Launched in 1897. Acquired by the US Navy in 1900 and commissioned in 1900 as USS Holland (SS-1). Decommissioned in 1905.
- HMS Holland 1 – First modern submarine in the Royal Navy.

== Patents ==
- U.S. patent 337,000 Hydrocarbon Engine
- U.S. patent 239,046 Screw Propeller
- U.S. patent 472,670 Submergible
- U.S. patent 491,051 Submarine Gun
- U.S. patent 492,960 Steering Apparatus
- U.S. patent 522,177 Submarine Boat
- U.S. patent 537,113 Submergible Boat
- U.S. patent 681,221 Submarine Boat
- U.S. patent 681,222 Submarine Boat
- U.S. patent 683,400 Submarine Boat
- U.S. patent 684,429 Visual Indicator
- U.S. patent 693,272 Auto Dive Mechanism
- U.S. patent 694,153 Auto Ballast
- U.S. patent 694,154 Submarine Boat
- U.S. patent 694,643 Submarine Boat
- U.S. patent 696,971 Firing Valve
- U.S. patent 696,972 Submarine Boat
- U.S. patent 702,728 Submarine Boat
- U.S. patent 702,729 Submarine Boat
- U.S. patent 706,561 Submarine Boat
- U.S. patent 708,552 Submarine Gun
- U.S. patent 708,553 Submarine Boat
- U.S. patent 815,350 Submarine Boat
- U.S. patent 1,050,654 Flying-machine

== See also ==
- Peral Submarine Spanish submarine of 1888
- Gymnote French submarine

== Sources ==
- John Philip Holland, Encyclopedia of World Biography, 2nd ed. 17 Vols. Gale Research, 1998
- International Directory of Company Histories, Volume 86 under General Dynamics/Electric Boat Corporation, July 2007, St. James Press/Thomposon Gale Group, pp. 136–139
- The Defender, The Story of General Dynamics, by Roger Franklin. Published by Harper & Row 1986.
- The Submarine in War and Peace by Simon Lake (1918), J. B. Lippincott & Co., Philadelphia, PA, pp 113–118
