= USS Alligator (1862) =

Submarine of the United States

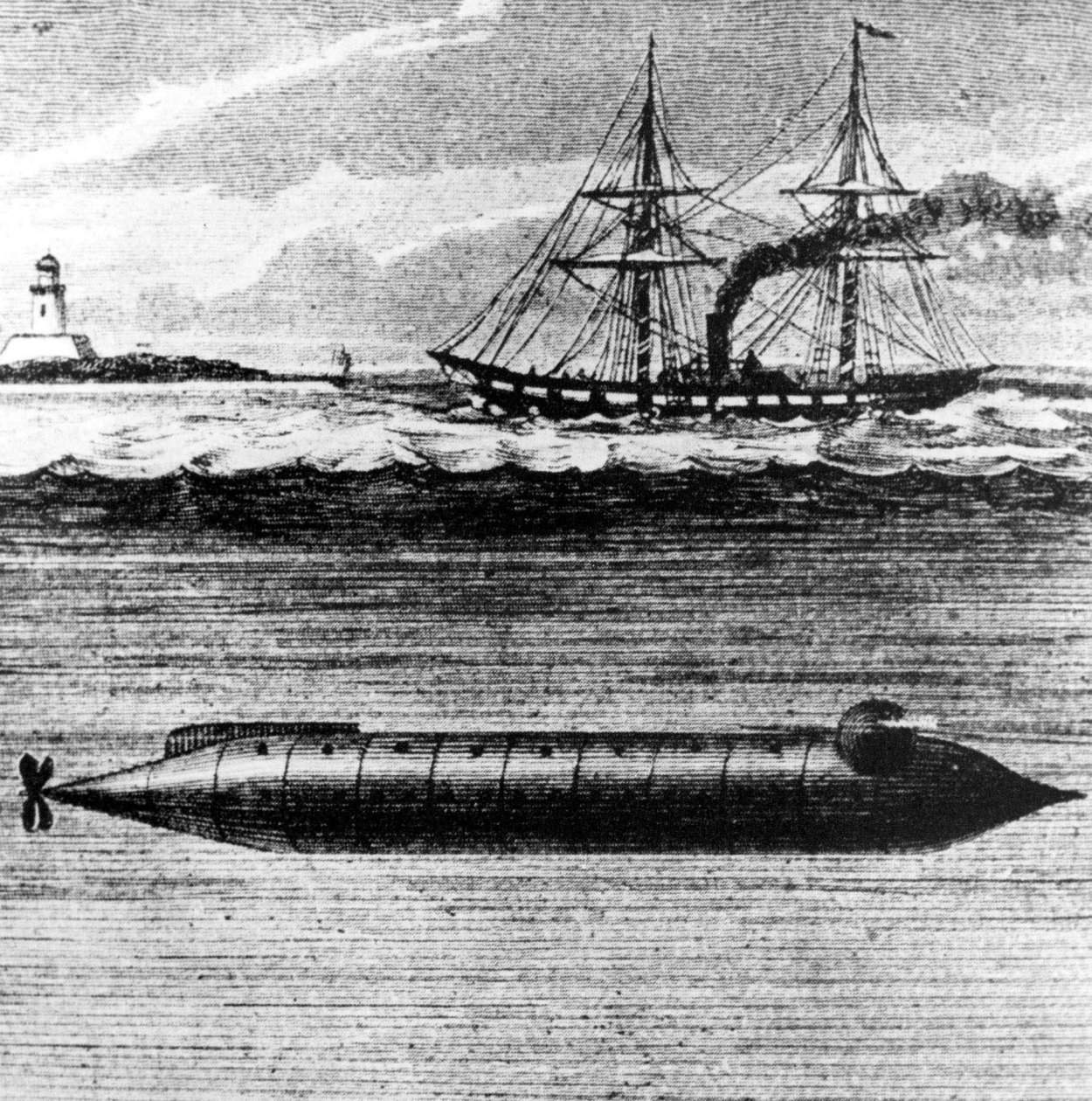
- Contemporary artist's rendering of Alligator

History

United States
- Name: Alligator
- Namesake: Alligator mississippiensis
- Ordered: November 1, 1861
- Builder: Neafie & Levy
- Launched: May 1, 1862
- In service: June 13, 1862
- Fate: Foundered April 2, 1863

General characteristics
- Length: 47 ft (14 m)
- Beam: 4 ft 8 in (1.42 m) (excluding oars); height of hull 5 ft 6 in (1.68 m)
- Propulsion: 1862: 18 × hand-powered oars; 1863: Hand-cranked propeller
- Speed: 1862: 2 knots (3.7 km/h); 1863: 4 knots (7.4 km/h)
- Test depth: 6.8 ft (2.1 m)
- Complement: 12 – One officer, one helmsman, one or two divers, and 8 oarsmen
- Armament: 2 × limpet mines

USS Alligator, the fourth United States Navy ship of that name, is the first known U.S. Navy submarine, and was active during the American Civil War (the first American underwater vehicle was Turtle during the Revolutionary War, and was operated by the Continental Army, rather than the Navy, in 1776 against British vessels in New York harbor). During the Civil War the Confederate States Navy would also build its own submarine, H. L. Hunley.

== Alligator Junior ==
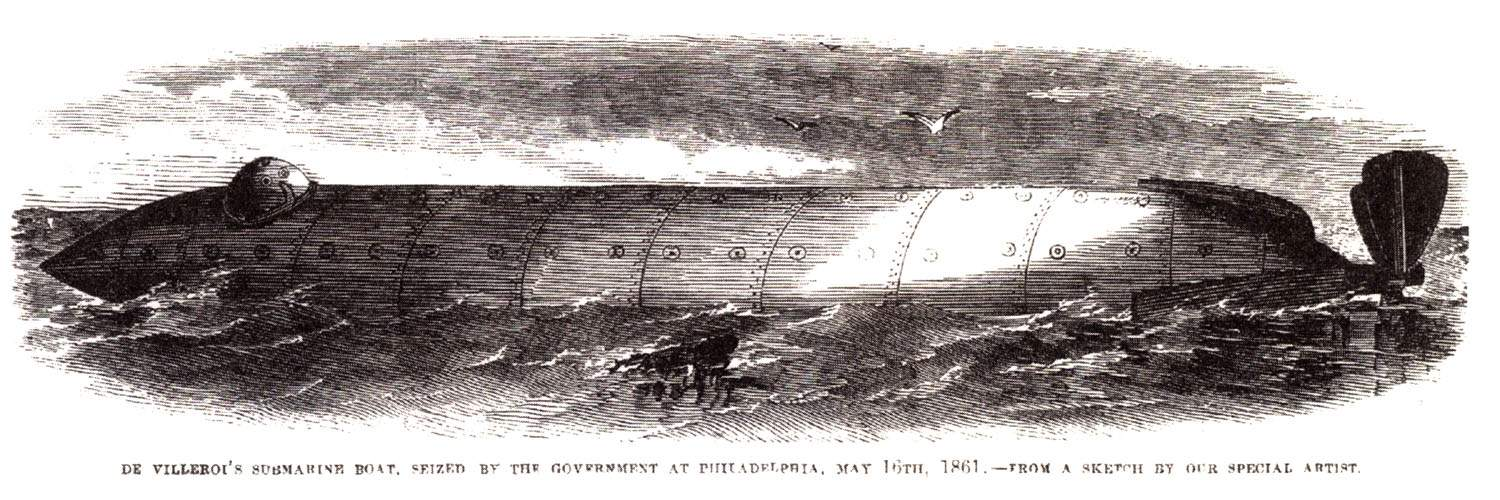
A newspaper illustration of Brutus de Villeroi's submarine seized in May 1861, which served as inspiration for Alligator

Brutus de Villeroi was a French engineer, inventor, and ship designer. Well-regarded in France where he had designed many diving ships, he immigrated to the United States in 1856, where he continued his work in shipbuilding. One of his ships was a salvage ship built in 1859. This ship was later retroactively dubbed the "Alligator Junior" (or Alligator Jr.) due to serving as something of a prototype for the Alligator. It was around 30–35 feet long, a mere 44 inches in diameter, iron-hulled, and weighed several tons. It was powered by a small propeller from the start, rather than the paddles and oars used in earlier designs (and the first version of the Alligator). The crew would pull a leather strap from the inside to turn the propeller. In theory, the boat could sail to a location, dive, rest on sea bottom, then release divers to collect nearby sunken salvage.

de Villeroi provided a public demonstration of the boat on October 2, 1859, near Marcus Hook, Pennsylvania, but the salvage ship appears to have been unused afterward, whether due to some unpublicized problem or lack of a financially sound plan to use the ship. At some point in 1861, the boat was moved across the Delaware River to New Jersey, perhaps to dock the boat more cheaply than in the Philadelphia region. de Villeroi seems to have attempted to sell the ship to the US Navy after the Attack on Fort Sumter, but his attempt was apparently ineffective or lost. The ship was reactivated and sailed the Delaware on the night of May 16 and morning of May 17, 1861; it was spotted by the Harbor Police, the two crewmen were arrested, and the ship was impounded at the Noble Street pier in Philadelphia. The crew's claims of the US Navy having arranged the voyage were quickly proven false. The curiosity drew public attention, speculation, and excitement. Commandant Samuel Francis Du Pont decided that the ship was not a threat, and returned it to its owners after an inspection at the Philadelphia Navy Yard. de Villeroi continued to press for the use of his invention, and Du Pont sent three officers to examine the boat on May 20. Their report in July found the existing ship as not feasible to use as a weapon – it was too slow and operated poorly in inclement weather conditions. de Villeroi offered to sell the ship to the US Navy, but was ignored; he wrote directly to President Lincoln asking that his inventions be given a chance. It was decided that while the old salvage ship was an interesting model but unworkable in practice, a larger and faster diving ship might yet have some potential.

The Alligator Junior seems to have been essentially abandoned afterward; it was probably tied up at the Rancocas Creek in New Jersey, but not maintained. Its position has been lost, although in 2024 a team proposed that they found a deposit of metal that may be the lost ship.

== Construction ==
In the autumn of 1861, the Union Navy asked the firm of Neafie & Levy to construct a small submersible ship designed by de Villeroi, who also acted as a supervisor during the first phase of the construction. The boat was about 47 feet (14 m) long, with a beam of 4 feet 8 inches (1.42 m) and height of 5 feet 6 inches (1.68 m). "It was made of iron, with the upper part pierced for small circular plates of glass, for light, and in it were several water tight compartments". She was designed to carry 18 men. For propulsion, she was equipped with 16 hand-powered paddles protruding from the sides. On July 3, 1862, the Washington Navy Yard had the paddles replaced by a hand-cranked propeller, which improved its speed to about four knots. Air was supplied from the surface by two tubes with floats, connected to an air pump located inside the submarine; it was the first operational submarine to have an air purifying system. The boat had a forward airlock, and was the first operational submarine with the capability for a diver to leave and return while both remained submerged. Divers could affix mines to a target, then return and detonate them by connecting the mine's insulated copper wire to a battery inside the vessel.

The Union Navy wanted such a vessel to counter the threat posed to its wooden-hulled blockaders by the former screw frigate Merrimack which, according to intelligence reports, the Norfolk Navy Yard was rebuilding as an ironclad ram for the Confederacy (CSS Virginia). The Union Navy's agreement with the Philadelphia shipbuilder specified that the submarine was to be finished in not more than 40 days; its keel was laid down almost immediately following the signing on November 1, 1861 of a contract for her construction. Nevertheless, the work proceeded so slowly that more than 180 days had elapsed when the novel craft finally was launched on May 1, 1862.

== Operational history ==
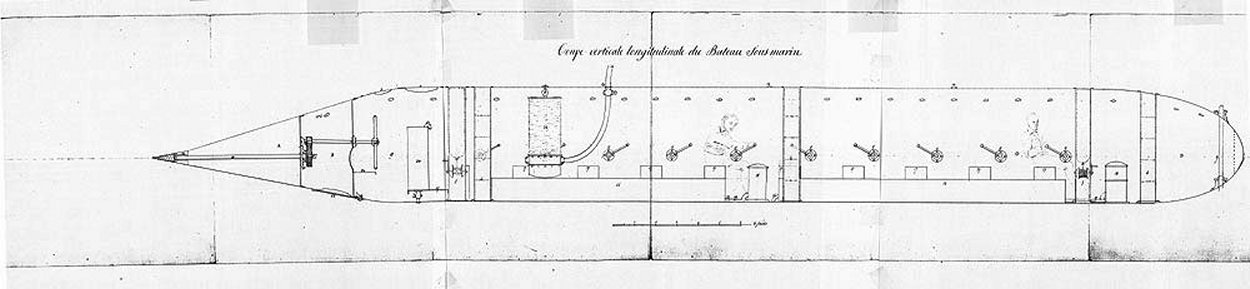
Plan of his submarine, by Brutus de Villeroi, describing the oar arrangement.

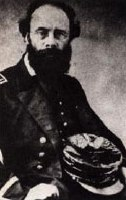
Samuel Eakins, first commander of Alligator

Soon after her launching, she was towed to the Philadelphia Navy Yard to be fitted out and manned. Two weeks later, she was placed under command of a civilian, Mr. Samuel Eakins. On June 13, the Navy formally accepted the boat.

Next, the steam tug Fred Kopp was engaged to tow the submarine to Hampton Roads, Virginia. The two vessels got underway on June 19, and proceeded down the Delaware River to the Delaware and Chesapeake Canal, through which they entered the Chesapeake Bay for the last leg of the voyage, reaching Hampton Roads on the 23rd. At Norfolk, the submarine was moored alongside the sidewheel steamer USS Satellite, which was to act as her tender during her service with the North Atlantic Blockading Squadron. A spring 1862 newspaper report called the vessel Alligator, in part because of its green color, a moniker which soon appeared in official correspondence.

Several tasks were considered for the vessel: destroying a bridge across Swift Creek, a tributary of the Appomattox River; clearing away the obstructions in the James River at Fort Darling, which had prevented Union gunboats from steaming upstream to support General McClellan's drive up the peninsula toward Richmond; and blowing up CSS Virginia II should that ironclad be completed on time and sent downstream to attack Union forces. Consequently, the submarine was sent up the James to City Point where she arrived on the 25th. Commander John Rodgers, the senior naval officer in that area, examined Alligator and reported that neither the James off Fort Darling nor the Appomattox near the bridge was deep enough to permit the submarine to submerge completely. Moreover, he feared that while his theater of operation contained no targets accessible to the submarine, the Union gunboats under his command would be highly vulnerable to her attacks should Alligator fall into enemy hands. He therefore requested permission to send the submarine back to Hampton Roads.

The ship headed downriver on the 29th and then was ordered to proceed to the Washington Navy Yard for more experimentation and testing. In August, Lt. Thomas O. Selfridge Jr. was given command of Alligator and she was assigned a naval crew. The tests proved unsatisfactory, and Selfridge pronounced "the enterprise ... a failure".

On July 3, 1862, the Navy Yard replaced Alligator's oars with a hand-cranked screw propeller, thereby increasing her speed to about 4 knots (7.4 km/h). President Lincoln observed the submarine in operation on March 18, 1863.

About this time, Rear Admiral Samuel Francis du Pont, who had become interested in the submarine while in command of the Philadelphia Navy Yard early in the war, decided that Alligator might be useful in carrying out his plans to take Charleston, South Carolina, the birthplace of secession. Acting Master John F. Winchester, who then commanded Sumpter, was ordered to tow the submarine to Port Royal, South Carolina. The pair got underway on March 31.

The next day, both encountered bad weather which, on April 2, forced Sumpter to cut Alligator adrift off Cape Hatteras. She either immediately sank or drifted for a while before sinking, ending the career of the United States Navy's first submarine. An attempt to find it in 2005 was not successful.

== See also ==
- French weapons in the American Civil War
- H. L. Hunley
- Turtle
