= Paterson Museum =

Museum in Passaic County, New Jersey

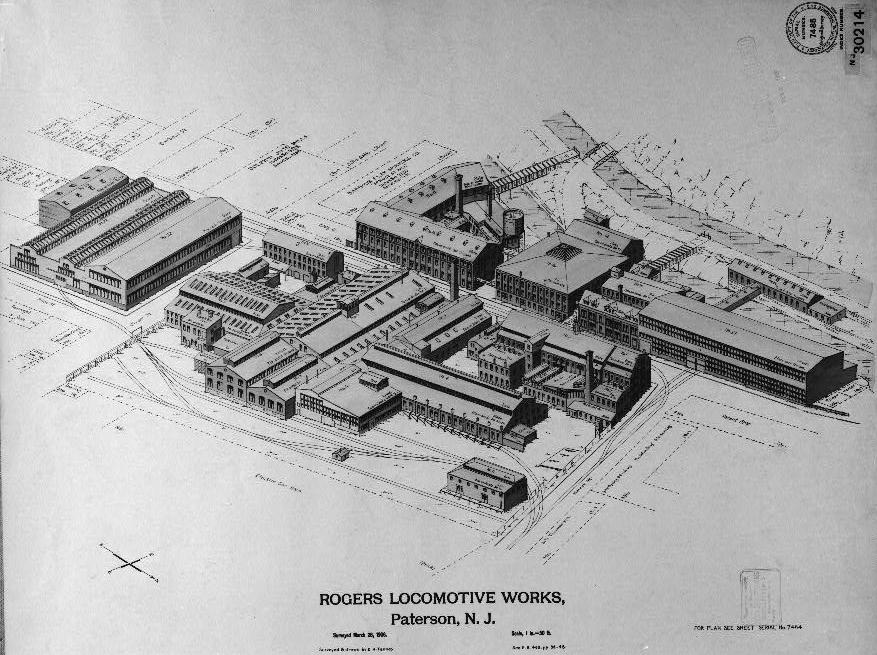
- An aerial-view drawing of the Rogers Locomotive Works plant in 1906
- Established: 1925
- Location: 2 Market Street; Paterson, NJ 07501
- Coordinates: 40.91354°N 74.17895°W
- Type: Industry museum
- Public transit access: Paterson station (rail); NJ Transit 365, 366, 704, 712 (bus)

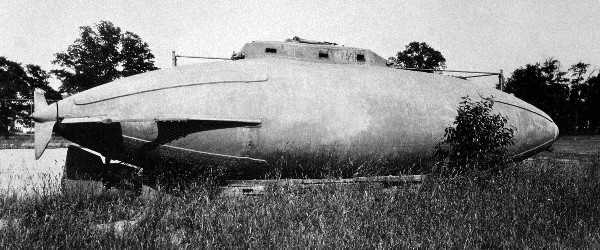
Fenian Ram submarine

Paterson Museum is a museum in Paterson, in Passaic County, New Jersey, in the United States. Founded in 1925, it is owned and run by the city of Paterson and its mission is to preserve and display the industrial history of Paterson. It is located in the Great Falls Historic District.

Since 1982 the museum has been housed in the Thomas Rogers Building on Market Street, the former erecting shop of Rogers Locomotive and Machine Works, a major 19th-century manufacturer of railroad steam locomotives. Prior to 1982 the museum was located in the former carriage house of Nathan Barnert, civic figure and philanthropist.

== Inventory ==
The museum has some notable old-found items. It has a range of old guns, Native American artifacts, to gem stones and old locomotives. Many tours are constantly coming from schools and other towns to inspect and check out these old items. The museum additionally has a beautiful painting collection, although to make room for more 'notable' items, they have put a lot of these paintings into personal hold.

The museum has a vast collection of medicine that was used in the early 1900s, along with beautiful paintings of medicine covers. The number of old medicine caps that they have vary in the hundreds. They also have paintings of old hospital assistants, and how life back in the infirmary was in the early years.

Notable exhibits include the Fenian Ram, the submarine designed by John Philip Holland for use by the Fenian Brotherhood and their earlier Holland I. The museum also houses an archive of Holland's life and work. A large collection of early Colt firearms and the façade of a playhouse built by Lou Costello for his children are also on display. There is a display of industrial equipment from the former silk-weaving factories that used to be a prominent part of Paterson's economy, including automated looms. The museum has a railroad track at its entrance, with live toy-model train going around the track.

== In popular culture ==
The museum's first head curator was James Ferdinand Morton Jr., who held the position from the museum's founding in 1925 until his death in 1941. Morton was friends with author H. P. Lovecraft, and based on this friendship, Lovecraft includes the Paterson Museum in a scene in his famous 1926 short story "The Call of Cthulhu". Lovecraft's 1935 short story "The Haunter of the Dark" includes an artifact called the Shining Trapezohedron; it has been proposed that Lovecraft based this artifact on a trapezoidal piece of almandine on display at the Paterson Museum.

== See also ==
- John P. Holland Centre
