= USS Plunger (1895) =

Submarine of the United States

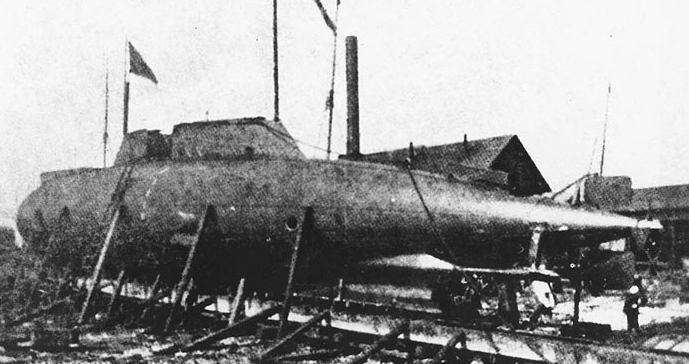
- Plunger while under construction at the Columbian Iron Works, Baltimore, Maryland

History

United States
- Name: USS Plunger - (Holland V)
- Namesake: Plunger, a diver or daring gambler
- Ordered: 13 March 1895
- Builder: Holland Torpedo Boat Company
- Launched: 7 August 1897
- Commissioned: Never
- Fate: Cancelled April 1900 prior to completion, scrapped in 1917

General characteristics
- Type: Submarine
- Displacement: 149 tons (nominal); 168 tons submerged
- Length: 85 ft 3 in (25.98 m)
- Beam: 11 ft 6 in (3.51 m)
- Draft: 11 ft (3.4 m)
- Propulsion: Steam engine
- Speed: 15 knots (28 km/h; 17 mph) surfaced; 8 knots (15 km/h; 9.2 mph) submerged
- Complement: 7
- Armament: 2 × 18-inch (450 mm) torpedo tubes

USS Plunger was an experimental submarine built for the United States Navy. She was ordered in 1895 and launched in 1897, but was never commissioned for active service. She is not to be confused with the later USS Plunger (SS-2), a.k.a. A-1, which served in the Navy from 1903 to 1913.

== Background ==
On 3 March 1893, the United States Congress authorized the first "submarine torpedo boat" to be built for the U.S. Navy. Inventor and submarine pioneer John P. Holland won a Navy design competition in 1895 to build it with his design for a submarine powered by a steam engine. The Navy ordered Holland's design and awarded a contract for her construction on 13 March 1895 to Holland's firm, the Holland Torpedo Boat Company. While building Plunger, Holland concluded that steam power would never be suitable in a submarine, and he abandoned construction of Plunger in favor of the construction of Holland VI, powered by a gasoline engine, which he funded personally. Accordingly, the Navy cancelled the contract for Plunger's construction in April 1900; the money paid towards her was credited to her successor USS Plunger (SS-2). That same month, it purchased Holland VI and commissioned her as its first submarine in November 1900 as USS Holland (SS-1).

== Experimental Plunger ==
The first Plunger (also called Holland V) was an experimental submarine which was evaluated by the United States Navy from 1898 to 1900. It was the fifth submarine designed and built by Irish engineer and inventor John Philip Holland. It was a 149-ton steam-powered submarine which had its design approved in October 1893 and built under a U.S. Navy contract issued in March 1895. Her features included three propellers, a steam engine plant, a retractable smokestack, thrusters to facilitate maneuvering, a camera lucida (an optical device serving as a periscope), and two torpedo tubes.

Plunger was constructed at the Columbia Iron Works in Baltimore, Maryland and launched on August 7, 1897, and the Navy conducted dock trials in 1898. Her complex steam power plant proved impractical for a submarine and the boat was not accepted for service by the Navy. The Navy considered reconstructing Plunger with new engines in July 1899 but decided against it. The contract was canceled between Holland and the Navy in 1900, and the money already outlaid was applied to the cost of purchasing a new submarine which became USS Plunger (SS-2). The original Plunger was kept by the Holland Torpedo Boat Company at its Holland Torpedo Boat Station in New Suffolk on Long Island, New York. She remained unused until she was scrapped in 1917.

Holland applied lessons learned from Plunger to the design of Holland VI, which was accepted by the Navy and commissioned as USS Holland. The name Plunger was given to the lead ship of the first multi-ship class of U.S. Navy submarines.

=== Specifications ===
- Length - 85 feet
- Diameter - 12 feet
- Displacement - 168 tons
- Armament - two torpedo tubes
