= Edmund Zalinski =

Polish-born American soldier and inventor

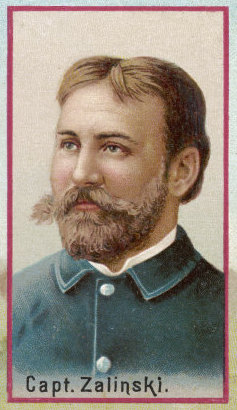
Edmund Zalinski as US Army Captain

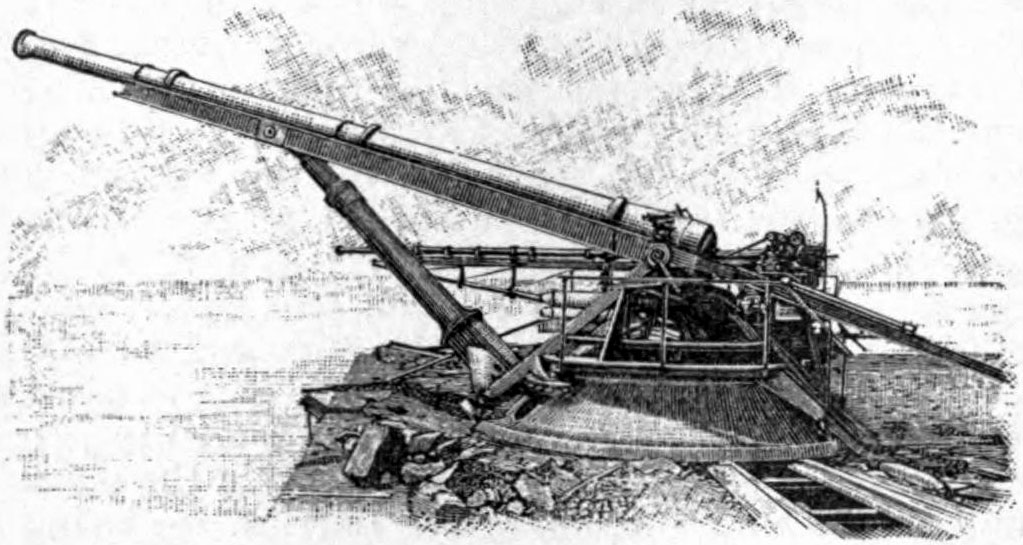
Edmund Zalinski' pneumatic dynamite torpedo gun

Edmund Louis Gray Zalinski (December 13, 1849 – March 11, 1909) was a Polish-born American soldier of Polish descent, military engineer and inventor. He is best known for the development of the pneumatic dynamite torpedo-gun.

== Early life and military service ==
Zalinski was born to a Jewish family in Kórnik, Prussian Poland on December 13, 1849, and emigrated with his parents to the United States in 1853. He began school in Seneca Falls, New York and attended high school in Syracuse until 1863, when he dropped out at the age of 15.

Lying about his age, Zalinski enlisted in the United States Army, and served during the American Civil War as aide-de-camp on the staff of General Nelson A. Miles from October 1864. In February 1865, he was commissioned a second lieutenant in the Second New York Heavy Artillery Regiment, having been recommended for promotion for gallant and meritorious conduct at the Battle of Hatcher's Run, Virginia. He continued on General Miles's staff until the surrender of General Robert E. Lee in April 1865.

Zalinski was mustered out of the volunteer service in September 1865 and was recommended for an appointment in the regular army. He was commissioned a second lieutenant in the Fifth United States Artillery on February 23, 1866. He was promoted to first lieutenant in January 1867, and finally to captain on December 9, 1887.

In 1867, Lieutenant Zalinski served with the 5th Artillery at the Fort Jefferson military prison, located on the Dry Tortugas islands of the Gulf of Mexico, about 70 miles west of Key West, Florida, and 90 miles north of Havana, Cuba. Four of the prisoners there were Dr. Samuel A. Mudd, Samuel Arnold, Michael O'Laughlen, and Edwin Spangler, who had all been found guilty in the 1865 Lincoln assassination trial. During an 1867 yellow fever epidemic at Fort Jefferson, Dr. Mudd was credited with saving the lives of many of those at the fort. Lieutenant Zalinski authored a petition to President Andrew Johnson, signed by 300 of the soldiers at the fort, to free Dr. Mudd for his heroic service during the epidemic. President Johnson pardoned Dr. Mudd in 1869, citing Lieutenant Zalinski's petition as one of the reasons.

== Academia and military engineering ==
Holland IV , also called the Zalinski Boat in 1885

From 1872 till 1876 Zalinski served at the Massachusetts Institute of Technology as professor of military science. He completed training at the U.S. Army Artillery School at Fort Monroe, on May 1, 1880, and at the school of submarine mining, Willets Point, New York, in July of the same year.

His name became widely known in connection with the invention and development of items of military technology, particularly the pneumatic dynamite torpedo-gun. He also invented the electrical fuse and other devices for the practical application of the weapon, and devised a method for the exact sight allowance to be made for deviation due to wind in the use of rifled artillery and small arms. Other inventions included a modified entrenching tool, a ramrod-bayonet, and a telescopic sight for artillery.

Zalinski also helped John Philip Holland raise money for the development of one of his submarines, which was armed with one of Zalinski's pneumatic guns. The two men having formed the Nautilus Submarine Boat Company, started working on a new submarine in 1884. The so-called "Zalinski Boat" was constructed in Hendrick's Reef (former Fort Lafayette), Bay Ridge in the New York City borough of Brooklyn. "The new, cigar-shaped submarine was 50 feet long with a maximum beam of eight feet. To save money, the hull was largely of wood, framed with iron hoops, and again, a Brayton-cycle engine provided motive power." The project was plagued by a "shoestring budget" and Zalinski mostly rejecting Holland's ideas on improvements. The submarine was ready for launching in September, 1885. "During the launching itself, a section of the ways collapsed under the weight of the boat, dashing the hull against some pilings and staving in the bottom. Although the submarine was repaired and eventually carried out several trial runs in lower New York Harbor, by the end of 1886 the Nautilus Submarine Boat Company was no more, and the salvageable remnants of the Zalinski Boat were sold to reimburse the disappointed investors." Holland would not create another submarine to 1893.

In 1889 and 1890 Zalinski traveled in Europe to study military affairs. He undertook garrison duty at San Francisco, California in 1892, and retired from the Army on February 3, 1894. On April 23, 1904, he was promoted to major on the retired list.

He was a companion of the Military Order of the Loyal Legion of the United States, a military society of officers of the Union armed forces and their descendants.

Zalinski died of pneumonia in Rochester, New York.
