= History of submarines =

The history of the submarine goes back to antiquity. Humanity has employed a variety of methods to travel underwater for exploration, recreation, research and significantly, warfare. While early attempts, such as those by Alexander the Great, were rudimentary, the advent of new propulsion systems, fuels, and sonar, propelled an increase in submarine technology. The introduction of the diesel engine, then the nuclear submarine, saw great expansion in submarine use — and specifically military use — during World War I, World War II, and the Cold War.

The Second World War use of the U-Boat by the Kriegsmarine against the Royal Navy and commercial shipping, and the Cold War's use of submarines by the United States and Russia, helped solidify the submarine's place in popular culture. The latter conflicts also saw an increasing role for the military submarine as a tool of subterfuge, hidden warfare, and nuclear deterrent. The military use of submarines continues to this day, predominantly by North Korea, China, the United States and Russia.

Beyond their use in warfare, submarines continue to have recreational and scientific uses. They are heavily employed in the exploration of the sea bed, and the deepest places of the ocean floor. They are used extensively in search and rescue operations for other submarines, surface vessels, and aircraft, and offer a means to descend vast depths beyond the reach of scuba diving for both exploration and recreation. They remain a focus of popular culture and the subject of numerous books and films.

== Early ==
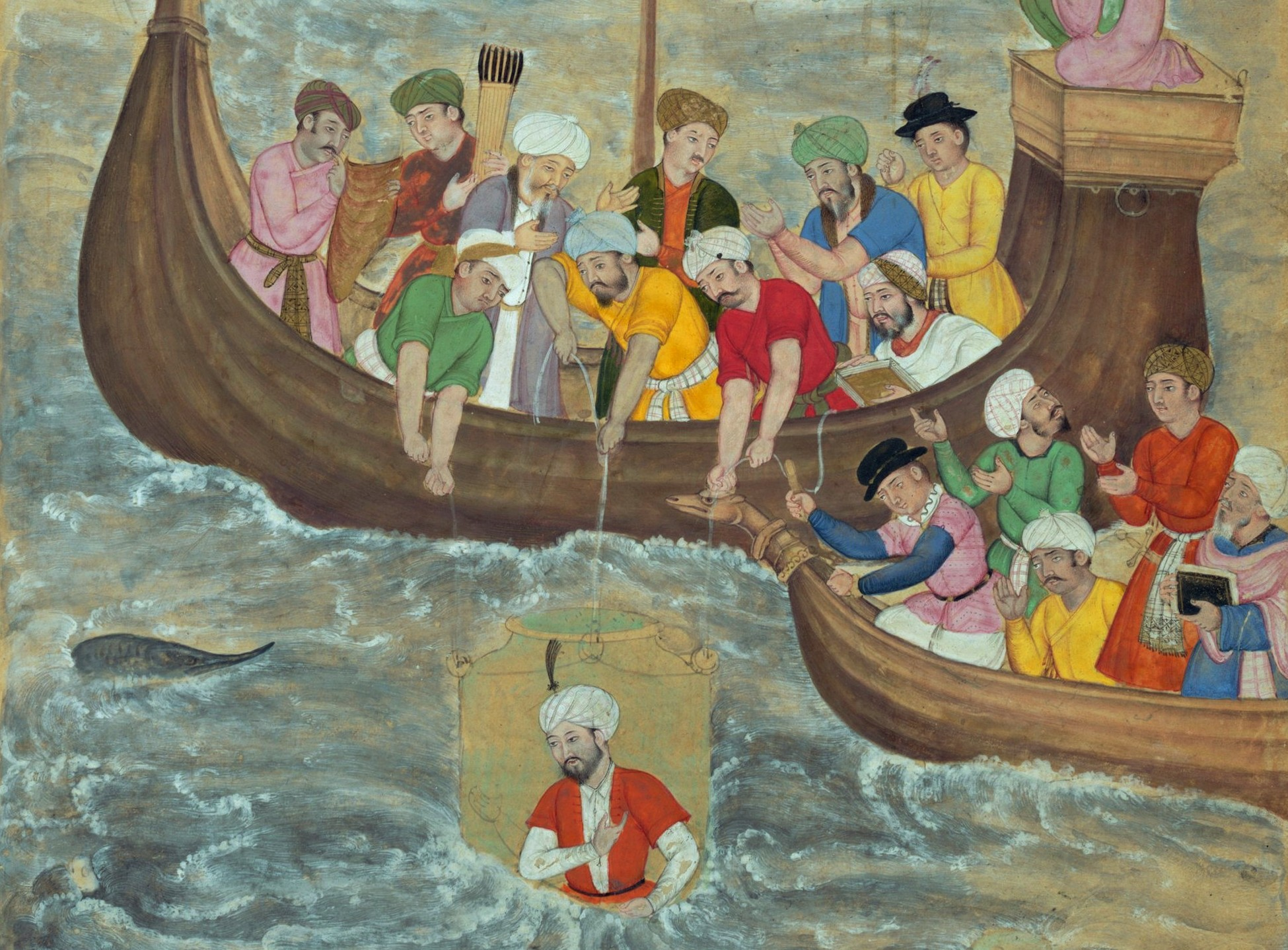
A 16th-century Islamic painting depicting Alexander the Great being lowered in a glass submersible

The concept of underwater transport has roots deep in antiquity. There are images of men using hollow sticks to breathe underwater for hunting at the temples at Thebes, and the first known military use occurred during the siege of Syracuse (415–413 BC), where divers cleared obstructions, according to the History of the Peloponnesian War. At the siege of Tyre (332 BC), Alexander the Great used divers, according to Aristotle. Later legends suggested that Alexander descended into the sea using a primitive submersible in the form of a diving bell, as depicted in a 16th-century illustration in the works of the Mughal poet Amir Khusrau.

According to a report attributed to Tahbir al-Tayseer in Opusculum Taisnieri published in 1562:

two Greeks submerged and surfaced in the river Tagus near the City of Toledo several times in the presence of The Holy Roman Emperor Charles V, without getting wet and with the flame they carried in their hands still alight.

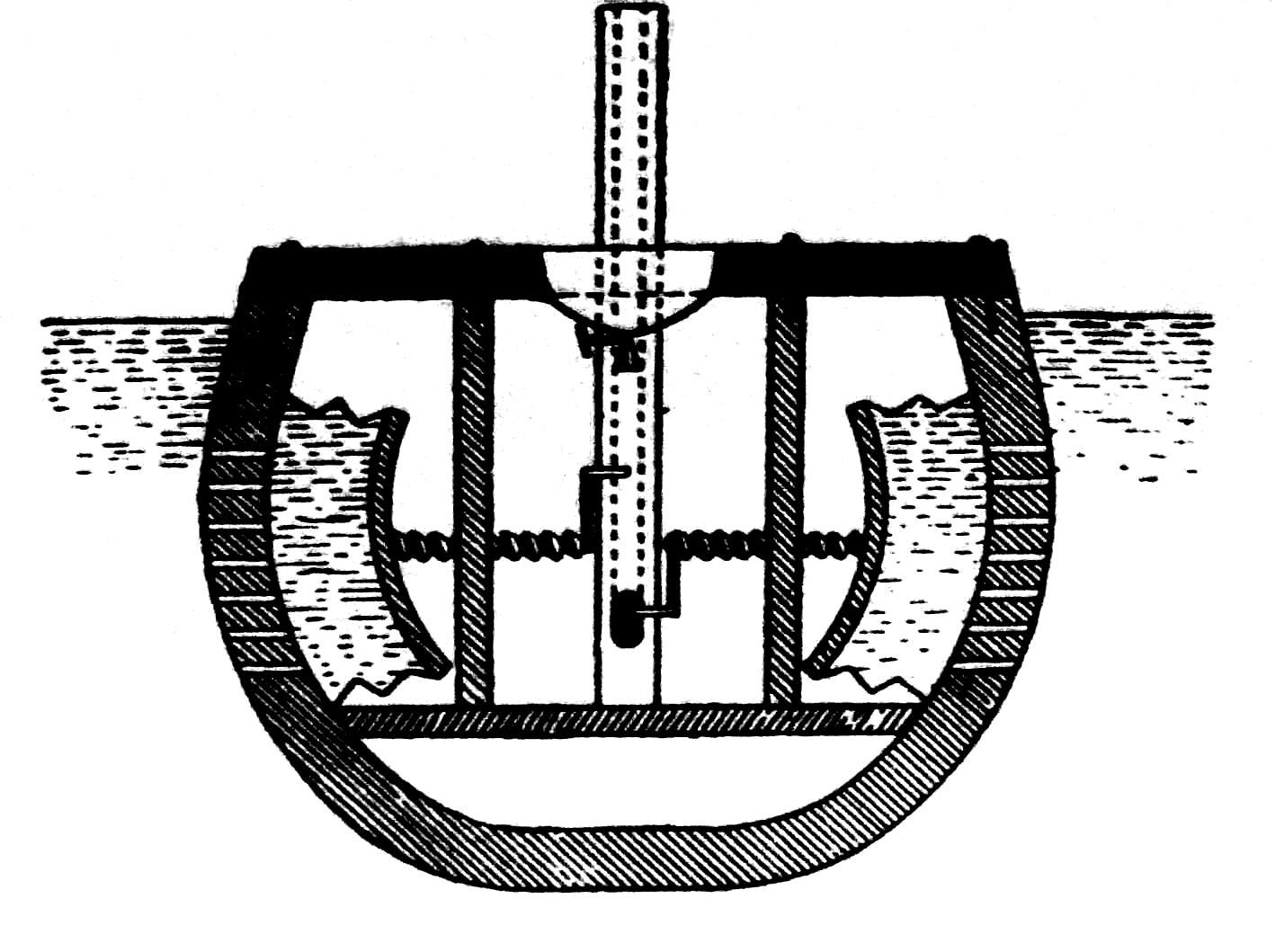
A submarine by William Bourne, in Inventions or devices, 1578.

There were various plans for submersibles or submarines during the Middle Ages. In Eastern Europe the Cossack Zaporozhian Host constructed underwater skiffs for use against Turkish positions. The Englishman William Bourne designed a prototype submarine in 1578. This was to be a completely enclosed boat that could be submerged and rowed beneath the surface. Comprising a completely enclosed wooden vessel sheathed in waterproofed leather, it was to be submerged by using hand-operated wooden screw thread adjustable plungers pressing against flexible leather bags located at the sides to increase or decrease the volume of water to adjust the buoyancy of the craft. The sketch suggests that the depth adjustment was utilizing a crankset projecting above the surface. There is no obvious accommodation for crew.

In 1596 the Scottish mathematician and theologian John Napier wrote in his Secret Inventions the following: "These inventions besides devises of sayling under water with divers, other devises and strategems for harming of the enemyes by the Grace of God and worke of expert Craftsmen I hope to perform." It remains unclear whether or not Napier ever carried out his plans. Henry Briggs, who was professor of mathematics at Gresham College, London, and later at Oxford, was a friend of Napier, whom he visited in 1615 and 1616, and was also an acquaintance of Cornelius Van Drebbel, a Dutchman in the service of James I of England, who designed and built the first successful submarine in 1620. Hence, it is not impossible that it was because of the interest taken by Napier in the submarine that Briggs came in touch with Drebbel.

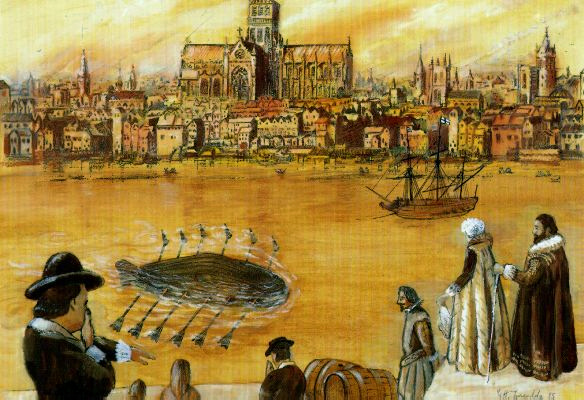
A submarine of Cornelius Jacobszoon Drebbel, 1620 and 1624.

Drebbel's submarine was propelled by oars. The precise nature of this submarine is unclear, it may be possible that it resembled a bell towed by a boat. Two improved types were tested in the River Thames between 1620 and 1624. Of one of these tests Constantijn Huygens reports in his autobiography of 1651 the following:

Worth all the rest put together is the little ship, in which he calmly dived under the water, while he kept the king and several thousand Londoners in the greatest suspense. The great majority of these already thought that the man who had very cleverly remained invisible to them – for three hours, as rumour has it – had perished, when he suddenly rose to the surface a considerable distance from where he had dived down, bringing with him the several companions of his dangerous adventure to witness to the fact that they had experienced no trouble or fear under the water, but had sat on the bottom, when they so desired, and had ascended when they wished to do so; that they had sailed whithersoever they had a mind, rising as much nearer the surface or again diving as much deeper as it pleased them to do, without even being deprived of light; yea, even that they had done in the belly of that whale all the things people are used to do in the air, and this without any trouble. From all this it is not hard to imagine what would be the usefulness of this bold invention in time of war, if in this manner (a thing which I have repeatedly heard Drebbel assert) enemy ships lying safely at anchor could be secretly attacked and sunk unexpectedly utilizing a battering ram – an instrument of which hideous use is made now-a-days in the capturing of the gates and bridges of towns.

On 18 October 1690, his son Constantijn Huygens Jr. commented in his diary on how Drebbel was able to measure the depth to which his boat had descended (which was necessary to prevent the boat from sinking) utilizing a quicksilver barometer:

Old Mistress Kuffler came to see me in the morning. She was still talking about a place at court or elsewhere; I said I could not help her. She said that her father Cornelis Drebbel had a long tube of quicksilver in the boat in which he dived be[sic] under water.

In order to solve the problem of the absence of oxygen, Drebbel was able to extract oxygen from saltpetre to refresh the air in his submarine. An indication of this can be found in Drebbel's own work: On the Nature of the Elements (1604), in the fifth chapter:

Very dry, subtle or warm air, which then very quickly penetrates the coarse, heavy clouds, expands them, makes them subtle and thin, and again changes them into the nature of air, whereby its volume is increased an hundredfold in a moment, which brings forth the terrific motion which, cracking and bursting, sets the air alight and moves it, until volume and density are equal, when there is rest. Thus is the body of the saltpetre broken up and decomposed by the power of the fire and so changed in the nature of the air, or as when a wet hand or cloth is waved about on a hot iron, or molten lead, which by expansion or enlargement due to heat cracks and bursts with a noise like thunder.

The introduction of Drebbel's submarine concept seemed beyond conventional expectations of the capability of contemporary science. Commenting on the scientific basis of Drebbel's claims, renowned German astronomer Johannes Kepler allegedly remarked in 1607: "If [Drebbel] can create a new spirit, by means of which he can move and keep in motion his instrument without weights or propelling power, he will be Apollo in my opinion."

Although the first submersible vehicles were tools for exploring underwater, it did not take long for inventors to recognize their military potential. The strategic advantages of submarines were first set out by Bishop John Wilkins of Chester in Mathematical Magick in 1648:

1. Tis private: a man may thus go to any coast in the world invisibly, without discovery or prevented in his journey.
2. Tis safe, from the uncertainty of Tides, and the violence of Tempests, which do never move the sea above five or six paces deep. From Pirates and Robbers which do so infest other voyages; from ice and great frost, which do so much endanger the passages towards the Poles.
3. It may be of great advantages against a Navy of enemies, who by this may be undermined in the water and blown up.
4. It may be of special use for the relief of any place besieged by water, to convey unto them invisible supplies; and so likewise for the surprisal of any place that is accessible by water.
5. It may be of unspeakable benefit for submarine experiments.

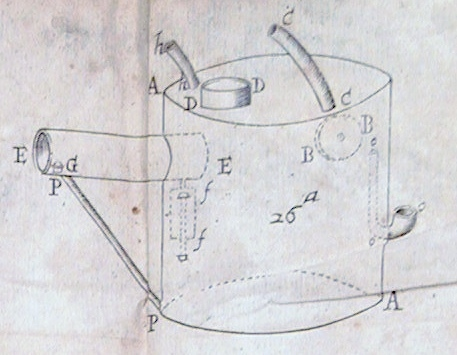
Denis Papin's second submarine design, 1690.

Between 1690 and 1692, the French physicist Denis Papin designed and built two submarines. The first design in 1690 was a strong and heavy metallic square box, equipped with an efficient pump that pumped air into the hull to raise the inner pressure. When the air pressure reached the required level, holes were opened to let in some water. This first machine was destroyed by accident. The second design in 1692 had an oval shape and worked on similar principles. A water pump controlled the buoyancy of the machine. According to some sources, a spy of German mathematician Gottfried Wilhelm Leibniz called Haes reported that Papin had met with some success with his second design on the River Lahn.

The Russian autodidact Yefim Nikonov designed and built military submarines in the decade from 1718 to 1728.

By the mid 18th century, over a dozen patents for submarines/submersible boats had been granted in England. In 1747, Nathaniel Symons patented and built the first known working example of the use of a ballast tank for submersion. His design used leather bags that could fill with water to submerge the craft. A mechanism twisted the water out of the bags and caused the boat to resurface. In 1749, the Gentlemen's Magazine reported that a similar design had been proposed by Giovanni Borelli in 1680. At this point of development, further improvement in design stagnated for over a century, until new industrial technologies for propulsion and stability emerged.

== Early modern ==
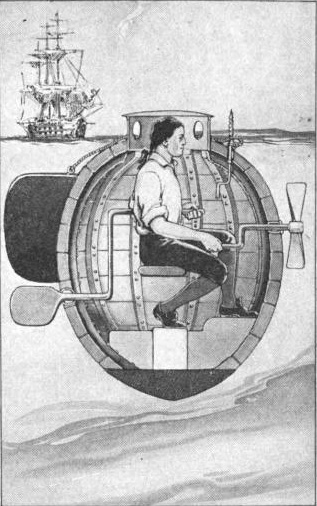
A cutaway depiction of David Bushnell's Turtle, 1776. Its paddle propeller has a different appearance than Archimedes' screw.

The first American military submarine was Turtle in 1776, a hand-powered egg-shaped (or acorn-shaped) device designed by the American David Bushnell, to accommodate a single man. It was the first submarine capable of independent underwater operation and movement, and the first to use screws for propulsion. However, according to British naval historian Richard Compton-Hall, the problems of achieving neutral buoyancy would have rendered the vertical propeller of the Turtle useless. The route that Turtle had to take to attack its intended target, HMS Eagle, was slightly across the tidal stream which would, in all probability, have resulted in Ezra Lee becoming exhausted. There are also no British records of an attack by a submarine during the war. In the face of these and other problems, Compton-Hall suggests that the entire story around the Turtle was fabricated as disinformation and morale-boosting propaganda, and that if Ezra Lee did carry out an attack, it was in a covered rowing boat rather than in Turtle. Replicas of Turtle have been built to test the design. One replica (Acorn), constructed by Duke Riley and Jesse Bushnell (claiming to be a descendant of David Bushnell), used the tide to get within 200 feet (61 m) of the RMS Queen Mary 2 in New York City (a police boat stopped Acorn for violating a security zone). Displays of replicas of Turtle which acknowledge its place in history appear in the Connecticut River Museum, the U.S. Navy's Submarine Force Library and Museum, Britain's Royal Navy Submarine Museum and Monaco's Oceanographic Museum.

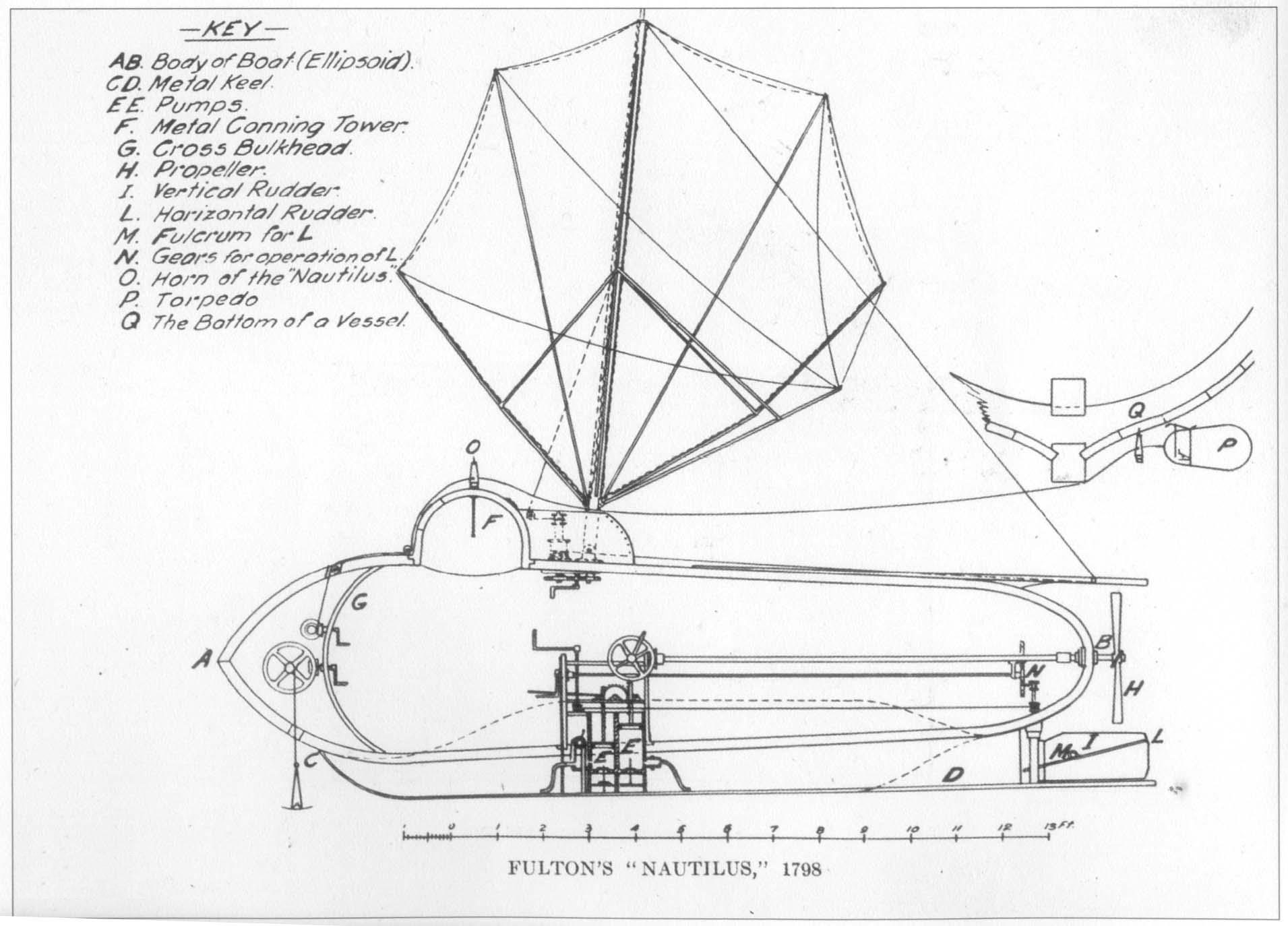
The Nautilus (1800), built in France by Robert Fulton.

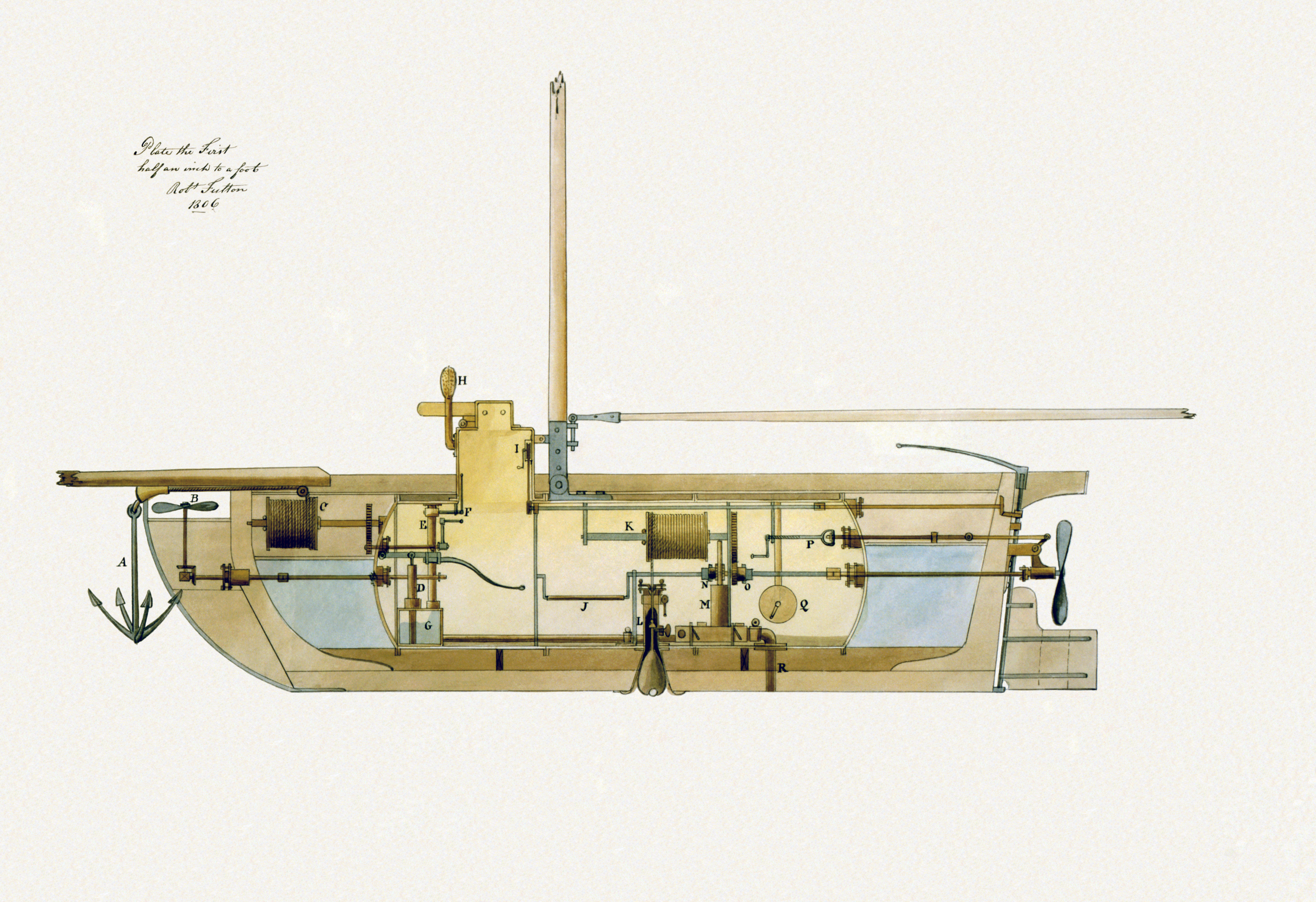
An 1806 submarine design by Robert Fulton.

In 1800, the French Navy built a human-powered submarine designed by Robert Fulton, the Nautilus. It also had a sail for use on the surface and so exhibited the first known use of dual propulsion on a submarine. It proved capable of using mines to destroy two warships during demonstrations. The French eventually gave up on the experiment in 1804, as did the British, when Fulton later offered them the submarine design.

In 1834 the Russian Army General Karl Andreevich Shilder demonstrated the first rocket-equipped submarine to Emperor Nicholas I.

The Submarino Hipopótamo, the first submarine built in South America, underwent testing in Ecuador on 18 September 1837. Its designer, Jose Rodriguez Lavandera, successfully crossed the Guayas River in Guayaquil accompanied by Jose Quevedo. Rodriguez Lavandera had enrolled in the Ecuadorian Navy in 1823, becoming a Lieutenant by 1830. The Hipopotamo crossed the Guayas on two more occasions, but it was abandoned because of lack of funding and interest from the government.

In 1851 a Bavarian artillery corporal, Wilhelm Bauer, took a submarine designed by him called the Brandtaucher (fire-diver) to sea in Kiel Harbour. Built by August Howaldt and powered by a treadwheel, Brandtaucher sank, but the crew of three managed to escape.

During the American Civil War both sides made use of submarines. Examples were the Alligator, for the Union, and the Hunley, for the Confederacy. The Hunley was the first submarine to successfully attack and sink an opposing warship. (see below)

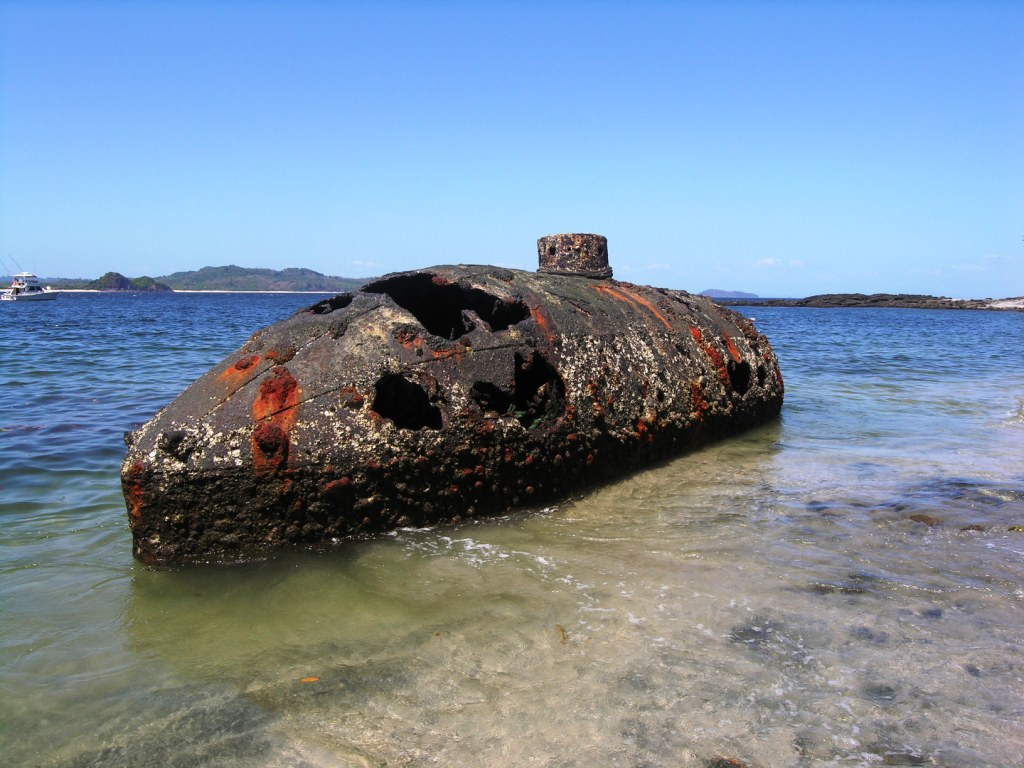
Wreck of Sub Marine Explorer in 2007

In 1863 the Sub Marine Explorer was built by the German American engineer Julius H. Kroehl, and featured a pressurized work chamber for the crew to exit and enter underwater. This pre-figured modern diving arrangements such as the lock-out dive chamber, though the problems of decompression sickness were not well understood at the time. After its public maiden dive in 1866, the Sub Marine Explorer was used for pearl diving off the coast of Panama. It was capable of diving deeper than 31 m (102 ft), deeper than any other submarine built before.

The Chilean government commissioned the Flach in 1865, during the Chincha Islands War (1864–1866) when Chile and Peru fought against Spain. Built by the German engineer Karl Flach, the submarine sank during tests in Valparaíso Bay on 3 May 1866, with the entire eleven-man crew.

During the War of the Pacific in 1879, the Peruvian government commissioned and built a submarine, the Toro Submarino design by the Peruvian engineer Federico Blume and built in Paita, Peru. It is considered the first operational submarine or submersible in Latin America. With 48 feet (15 meters) long and manually operate by a crew of 11 persons, it could submerge to a depth of 12 ft (3.7 m) with a ventilation system a speed of 3 kn (5.6 km/h; 3.5 mph) and a maximum dive of 72 feet (22 meters). Being fully operational, waiting for its opportunity to attack with naval mines during the Blockade of Callao, it was scuttled to avoid its capture by Chilean troops on 17 January 1881, before the imminent occupation of Lima.

== Mechanical power ==
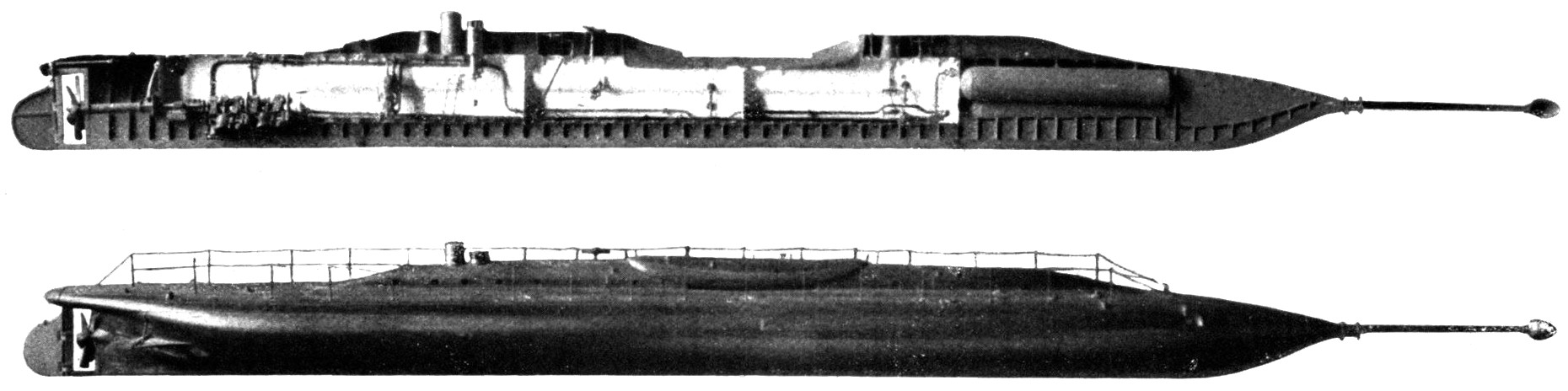
Plongeur, the first submarine that did not rely on human power for propulsion.

The first submarine that did not rely on human power for propulsion was the French Navy submarine Plongeur, launched in 1863, and equipped with a reciprocating engine using compressed air from 23 tanks at 180 psi (1,200 kPa). In practice, the submarine was virtually unmanageable underwater, with very poor speed and maneouverability.

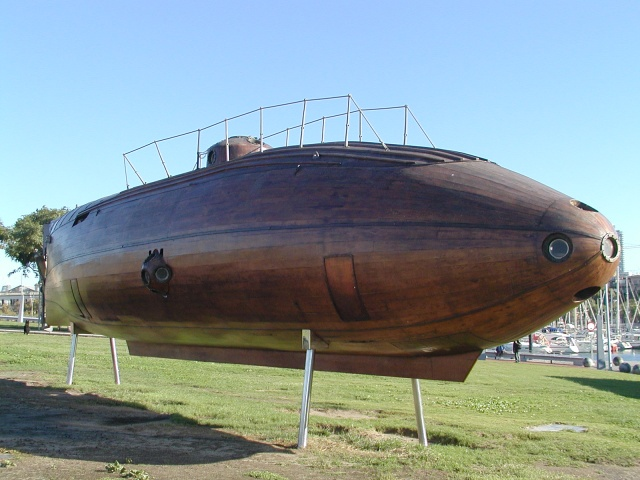
A replica of Monturiol's wooden Ictineo II stands near Barcelona harbor.

The first air independent and combustion powered submarine was the Ictineo II, designed by the Spanish engineer Narcís Monturiol. Originally launched in 1864 as a human-powered vessel, propelled by 16 men, it was converted to peroxide propulsion and steam in 1867. The 14 meters (46 feet) craft was designed for a crew of two, could dive to 30 metres (98 feet), and demonstrated dives of two hours. On the surface, it ran on a steam engine, but underwater such an engine would quickly consume the submarine's oxygen. To solve this problem, Monturiol invented an air-independent propulsion system. As the air-independent power system drove the screw, the chemical process driving it also released oxygen into the hull for the crew and an auxiliary steam engine. Apart from being mechanically powered, Monturiol's pioneering double-hulled vessels also solved pressure, buoyancy, stability, diving and ascending problems that earlier designs had encountered.

The submarine became a potentially viable weapon with the development of the first practical self-propelled torpedoes. The Whitehead torpedo was the first such weapon, and was designed in 1866 by British engineer Robert Whitehead. His 'mine ship' was an 11-foot (3.4 m) long, 14-inch (36 cm) diameter torpedo propelled by compressed air and carried an explosive warhead. The device had a speed of 7 knots (13 km/h) and could hit a target 700 yards (640 m) away. Many naval services procured the Whitehead torpedo during the 1870s and it first proved itself in combat during the Russo-Turkish War when, on 16 January 1878, the Turkish ship Intibah was sunk by Russian torpedo boats carrying Whiteheads.

During the 1870s and 1880s, the basic contours of the modern submarine began to emerge, through the inventions of the English inventor and curate, George Garrett, and his industrialist financier Thorsten Nordenfelt, and the Irish inventor John Philip Holland.

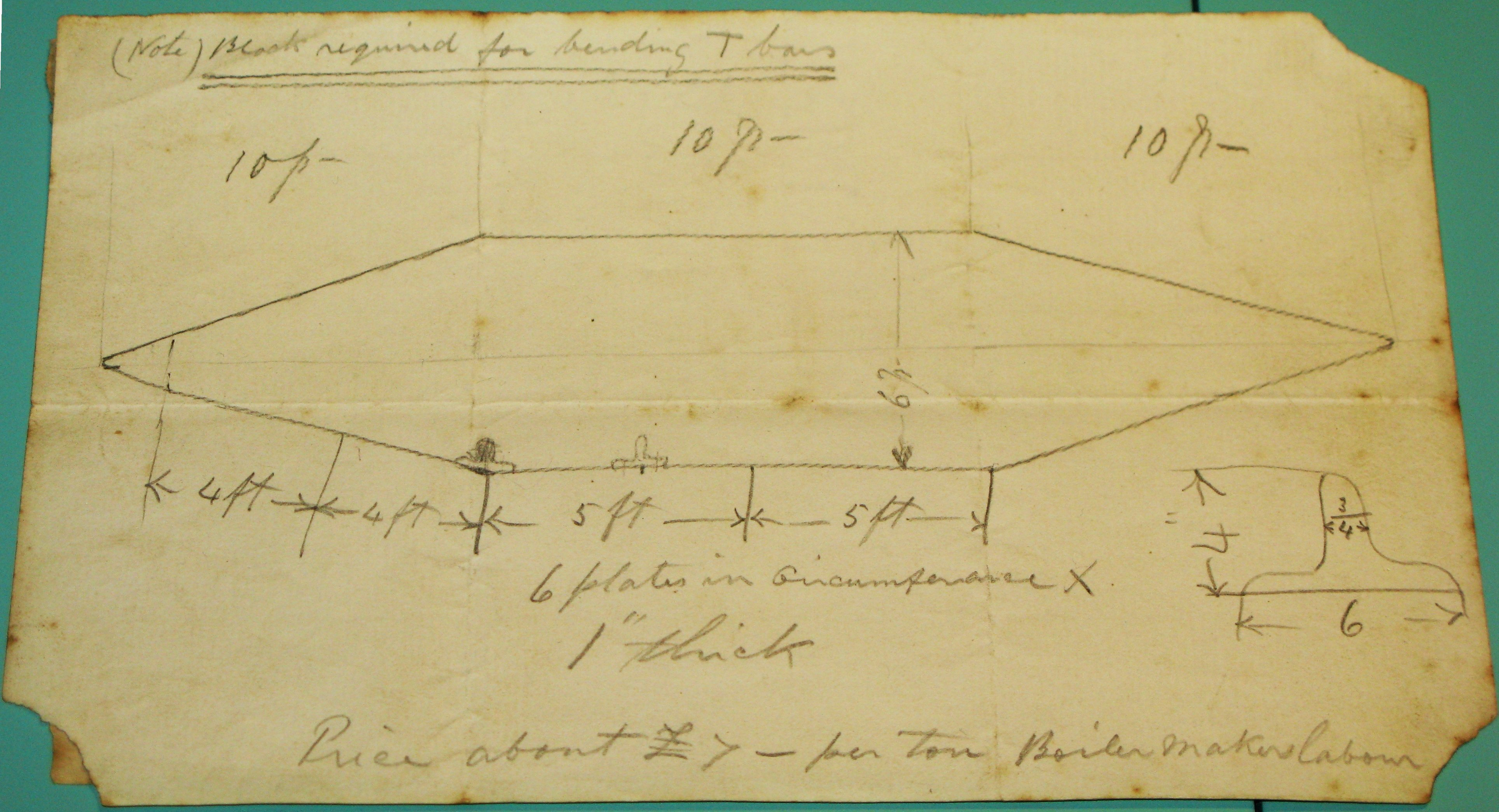
Sketch of the design of Resurgam II by George Garrett.

In 1878, Garrett built a 14-foot (4.3 m) long hand-cranked submarine of about 4.5 tons, which he named the Resurgam. This was followed by the second (and more famous) Resurgam of 1879, built by Cochran & Co. at Birkenhead, England. The construction was of iron plates fastened to iron frames, with the central section of the vessel clad with wood secured by iron straps. As built, it was 45 feet (14 m) long by 10 feet (3.0 m) in diameter, weighed 30 long tons (30 t), and had a crew of 3. Resurgam was powered by a closed cycle steam engine, which provided enough steam to turn the single propeller for up to 4 hours. It was designed to have positive buoyancy, and diving was controlled by a pair of hydroplanes amidships. At the time it cost £1,538.

Although his design was not very practical – the steam boiler generated intense heat in the cramped confines of the vessel, and it lacked longitudinal stability – it caught the attention of the Swedish industrialist Thorsten Nordenfelt. Discussions between the two led to the first practical steam-powered submarines, armed with torpedoes and ready for military use.

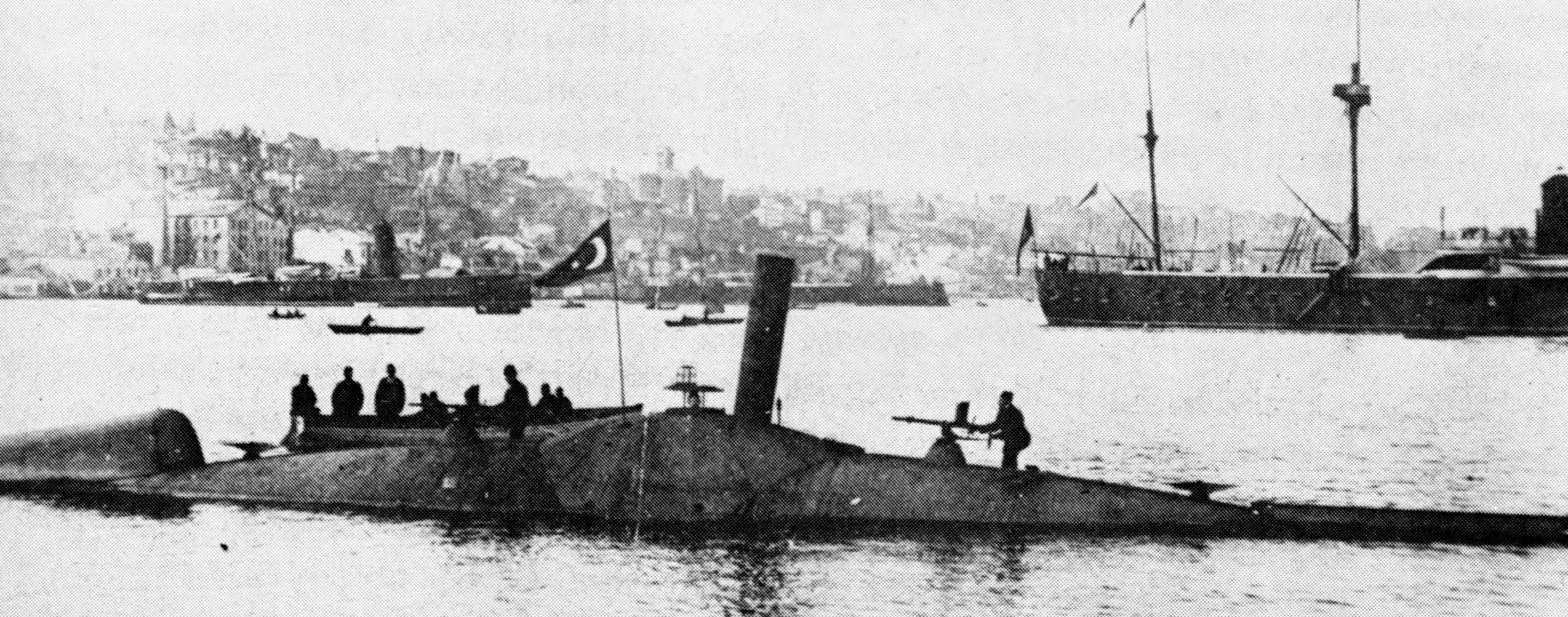
The Nordenfelt-designed, Ottoman submarine Abdül Hamid

The first such boat was the Nordenfelt I, a 56 tonne, 19.5 metres (64 feet) vessel similar to Garret's ill-fated Resurgam, with a range of 240 kilometres (150 miles; 130 nautical miles), armed with a single torpedo, in 1885. Like Resurgam, Nordenfelt I operated on the surface by steam, then shut down its engine to dive. While submerged, the submarine released pressure generated when the engine was running on the surface to provide propulsion for some distance underwater. Greece, fearful of the return of the Ottomans, purchased it. Nordenfelt commissioned the Barrow Shipyard in England in 1886 to build Nordenfelt II (Abdül Hamid) and Nordenfelt III (Abdül Mecid) in 1887. They were powered by a coal-fired 250 hp (190 kW) Lamm steam engine turning a single screw, and carried two 356mm torpedo tubes and two 35mm machine guns. They were loaded with a total of 8 tons of coal as fuel and could dive to a depth of 160 feet (49 m). It was 30.5m long and 6m wide, and weighed 100 tons. It carried a normal crew of 7. It had a maximum surface speed of 6 knots (11 km/h), and a maximum speed of 4 knots (7.4 km/h) while submerged. Abdülhamid became the first submarine in history to fire a torpedo submerged.

Nordenfelt's efforts culminated in 1887 with Nordenfelt IV, which had twin motors and twin torpedoes. It was sold to the Russians, but soon ran aground and was scrapped. Garrett and Nordenfelt made significant advances in constructing the first modern, militarily capable submarines and fired up military and popular interest around the world for this new technology. However, the solution to fundamental technical problems, such as propulsion, quick submergence, and the maintenance of balance underwater was still lacking, and would only be solved in the 1890s.

== Electric power ==
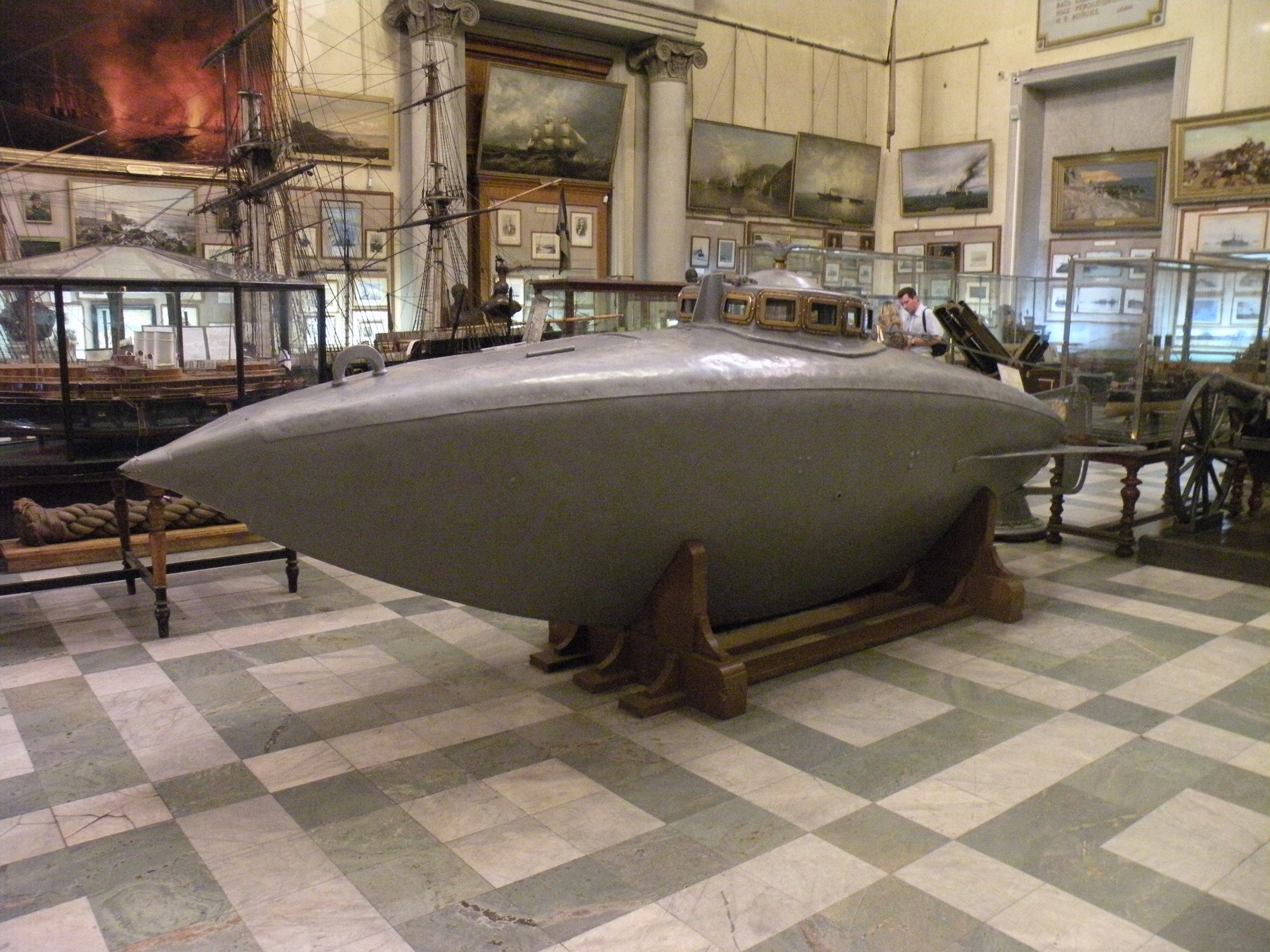
Drzewiecki-designed submarine built in 1881 and now in the Central Naval Museum, Saint Petersburg

A reliable means of propulsion for submerged vessels was only made possible in the 1880s with the advent of the necessary electric battery technology. The first electrically powered submarines were built by the Polish engineer Stefan Drzewiecki in 1881, he designed and constructed the world's first submarine in Russia, and later other engineers used his design in their constructions, they were James Franklin Waddington and the team of James Ash and Andrew Campbell in England, Dupuy de Lôme and Gustave Zédé in France and Isaac Peral in Spain.

In 1884, Drzewiecki converted 2 mechanical submarines, installing in each a 1 hp (0.75 kW) engine with a new, at the time, source of energy – batteries. In tests, the submarines travelled under the water against the flow of the Neva River at a rate of 4 knots (7.4 km/h). They were the first submarines in the world with electric propulsion. Ash and Campbell constructed their craft, the Nautilus, in 1886. It was 60 feet (18 m) long with a 9.7 kW (13 hp) engine powered by 52 batteries. It was an advanced design for the time, but became stuck in the mud during trials and was discontinued. Waddington's Porpoise vessel showed more promise. Waddington had formerly worked in the shipyard in which Garrett had been active. Waddington's vessel was similar in size to the Resurgam and its propulsion system used 45 accumulator cells with a capacity of 660 ampere hours each. These were coupled in series to a motor driving a propeller at about 750 rpm, giving the ship a sustained speed of 13 km/h (8 mph) for at least 8 hours. The boat was armed with two externally mounted torpedoes as well as a mine torpedo that could be detonated electronically. Although the boat performed well in trials, Waddington was unable to attract further contracts and went bankrupt.

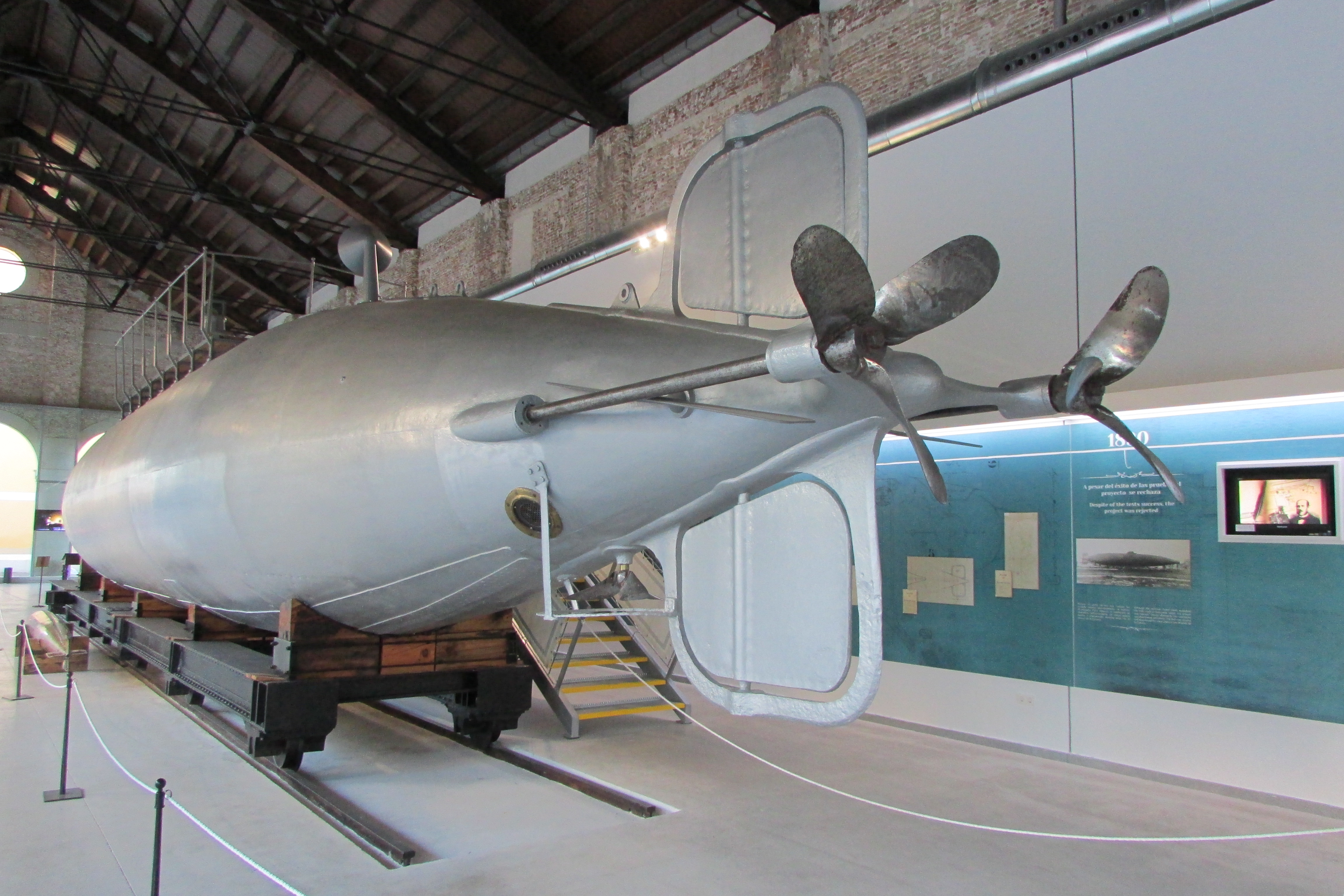
The Peral Submarine, one of the first electrical powered submarines. Built in 1888, now preserved and restored in 2013 in Cartagena Naval Museum.

In France, the early electric submarines Goubet I and Goubet II were built by the civil engineer, Claude Goubet. These boats were also unsuccessful, but they inspired the renowned naval architect Dupuy de Lôme to begin work on his submarine – an advanced electric-powered submarine almost 20 metres long. He didn't live to see his design constructed, but the craft was completed by Gustave Zédé in 1888 and named the Gymnote. It was one of the first truly successful electrically powered submarines, and was equipped with an early periscope and an electric gyrocompass for navigation. It completed over 2,000 successful dives using a 204-cell battery. Although the Gymnote was scrapped for its limited range, its side hydroplanes became the standard for future submarine designs.

The Peral Submarine, constructed by Isaac Peral, was launched by the Spanish Navy in the same year, 1888. It had three Schwartzkopff torpedoes 14 inches (360 mm) and one torpedo tube in the bow, new air systems, hull shape, propeller, and cruciform external controls anticipating much later designs. Peral was an all-electrical powered submarine with an underwater speed of 3 kn (5.6 km/h; 3.5 mph). After two years of trials the project was scrapped by naval officialdom who cited, among other reasons, concerns over the range permitted by its batteries.

Many more designs were built at this time by various inventors, but submarines were not put into service by navies until the turn of the 20th century.

== Modern ==
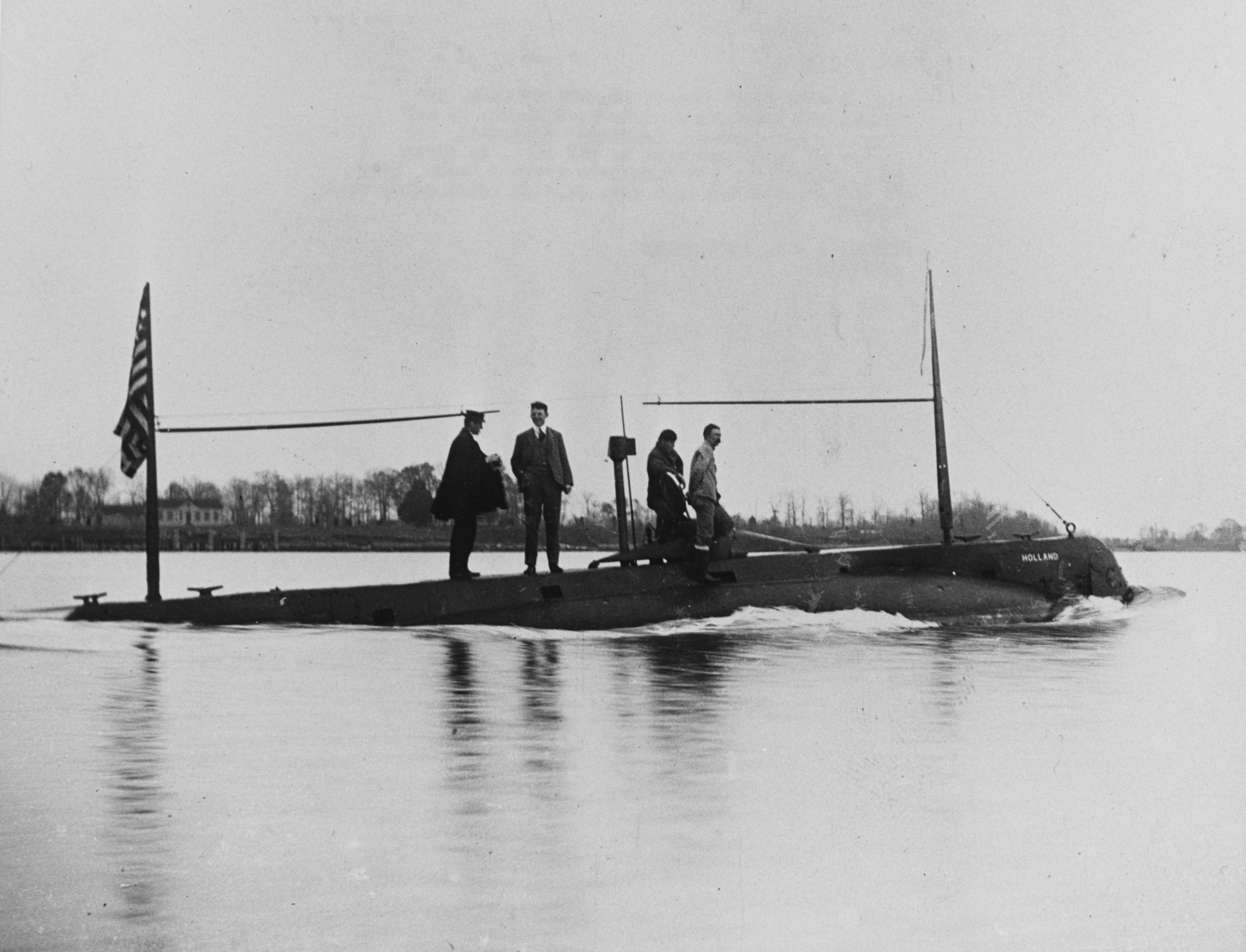
USS Holland was commissioned into the U.S. Navy in 1900 at the Holland Torpedo Boat Station.

The turn of the 20th century marked a pivotal time in the development of submarines, with a number of important technologies making their debut, as well as the widespread adoption and fielding of submarines by a number of nations. Diesel electric propulsion would become the dominant power system and instruments such as the periscope would become standardized. Batteries were used for running underwater and gasoline (petrol) or diesel engines were used on the surface and to recharge the batteries. Early boats used gasoline, but quickly gave way to kerosene, then diesel, because of reduced flammability. Effective tactics and weaponry were refined in the early part of the century, and the submarine would have a large impact on 20th century warfare.

The Irish inventor John Philip Holland built a model submarine in 1876 and a full scale one in 1878, followed by a number of unsuccessful ones. In 1896, he designed the Holland Type VI submarine. This vessel made use of internal combustion engine power on the surface and electric battery power for submerged operations. Launched on 17 May 1897 at Navy Lt. Lewis Nixon's Crescent Shipyard in Elizabeth, New Jersey, the Holland VI was purchased by the United States Navy on 11 April 1900, becoming the United States Navy's first commissioned submarine and renamed USS Holland.

A prototype version of the A-class submarine (Fulton) was developed at Crescent Shipyard under the supervision of naval architect and shipbuilder from the United Kingdom, Arthur Leopold Busch, for the newly reorganized Electric Boat Company in 1900. The Fulton was never commissioned by the United States Navy and was sold to the Imperial Russian Navy in 1905. The submarines were built at two different shipyards on both coasts of the United States. In 1902, Holland received U.S. patent 708,553 for his relentless pursuit to perfect the modern submarine craft. Many countries became interested in Holland's (weapons) product and purchased the rights to build them during this time.

The Royal Navy commissioned the Holland-class submarine from Vickers, Barrow-in-Furness, under licence from the Holland Torpedo Boat Company during the years 1901 to 1903. Construction of the boats took longer than anticipated, with the first only ready for a diving trial at sea on 6 April 1902. Although the design had been purchased entirely from the US company, the actual design used was an untested improved version of the original Holland design using a new 180 hp (130 kW) petrol engine.

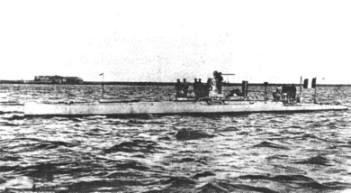
The 1900 French submarine Narval.

Meanwhile, the French steam and electric Narval was commissioned in June 1900 and introduced the classic double-hull design, with a pressure hull inside the outer shell. These 200-ton ships had a range of over 100 miles (160 km) underwater. The French submarine Aigrette in 1904 further improved the concept by using a diesel rather than a gasoline engine for surface power. Large numbers of these submarines were built, with seventy-six completed before 1914.

By 1914, all the main powers had submarine fleets, though the development of a strategy for their use lay in the future.

At the start of World War I, the Royal Navy had the world's largest submarine service by a considerable margin, with 74 boats of the B, C and D classes, of which 15 were oceangoing, with the rest capable of coastal patrols. The D-class, built 1907–1910, were designed to be propelled by diesel motors on the surface to avoid the problems with petrol engines experienced with the A class. These boats were designed for foreign service with an endurance of 2,500 nmi (4,600 km) at 10 knots (19 km/h) on the surface and much-improved living conditions for a larger crew. They were fitted with twin screws for greater maneuverability and with innovative saddle tanks. They were also the first submarines to be equipped with deck guns forward of the conning tower. Armament also included three 18-inch (46 cm) torpedo tubes (two vertically in the bow and one in the stern). D-class was also the first class of submarine to be equipped with standard wireless transmitters. The aerial was attached to the mast of the conning tower that was lowered before diving. With their enlarged bridge structure, the boat profile was recognisably that of the modern submarine. The D-class submarines were considered to be so innovative that the prototype D1 was built in utmost secrecy in a securely guarded building shed.

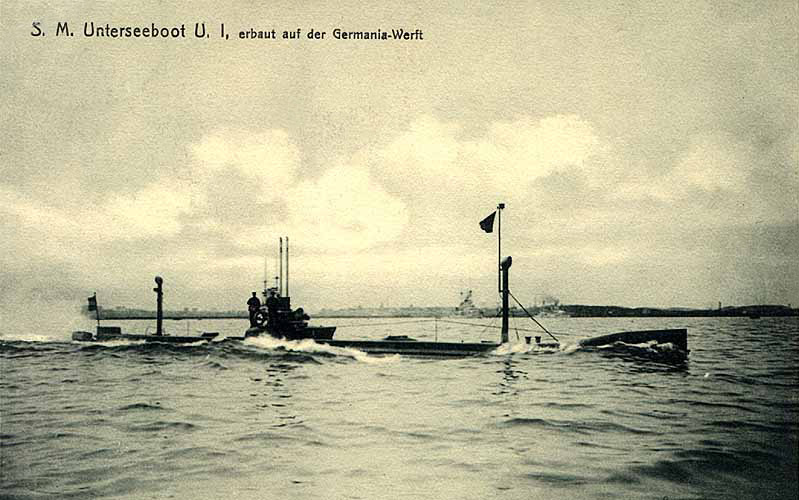
The U-1 became the Kaiserliche Marine's first commissioned submarine in 1906.

The British also experimented with other power sources. Oil-fired steam turbines powered the British "K" class submarines built during the First World War and in following years, but these were not very successful. The aim was to give them the necessary surface speed to keep up with the British battle fleet.

The Germans were slower to recognize the importance of this new weapon. A submersible was initially ordered by the Imperial Russian Navy from the Kiel shipyard in 1904, but cancelled after the Russo-Japanese War ended. One example was modified and improved, then commissioned into the Imperial German Navy in 1906 as its first U-boat, U-1. It had a double hull, was powered by a Körting kerosene engine and was armed with a single torpedo tube. The fifty percent larger SM U-2 had two torpedo tubes. A diesel engine was not installed in a German navy boat until the U-19 class of 1912–13. At the start of World War I, Germany had 20 submarines of 13 classes in service with more under construction.

== Interwar ==
Diesel submarines needed air to run their engines, and so carried very large batteries for submerged travel. These limited the speed and range of the submarines while submerged.

An early submarine snorkel was designed by James Richardson, an assistant manager at Scotts Shipbuilding and Engineering Company, Greenock, Scotland, as early as 1916. The snorkel allowed the submarine to avoid detection for long periods by travelling under the water using non-electric powered propulsion. Although the company received a British Patent for the design, no further use was made of it—the British Admiralty did not accept it for use in Royal Navy submarines.

The first German U-boat to be fitted with a snorkel was U-58, which experimented with the equipment in the Baltic Sea during the summer of 1943. The technology was based on pre-war Dutch experiments with a device named a snuiver (sniffer). As early as 1938, a simple pipe system was installed on the submarines HNLMS O 19 and O 20 that enabled them to travel at periscope depth operating on its diesels with almost unlimited underwater range while charging the propulsion batteries. U-boats began to use it operationally in early 1944. By June 1944, about half of the boats stationed in the French bases were fitted with snorkels.

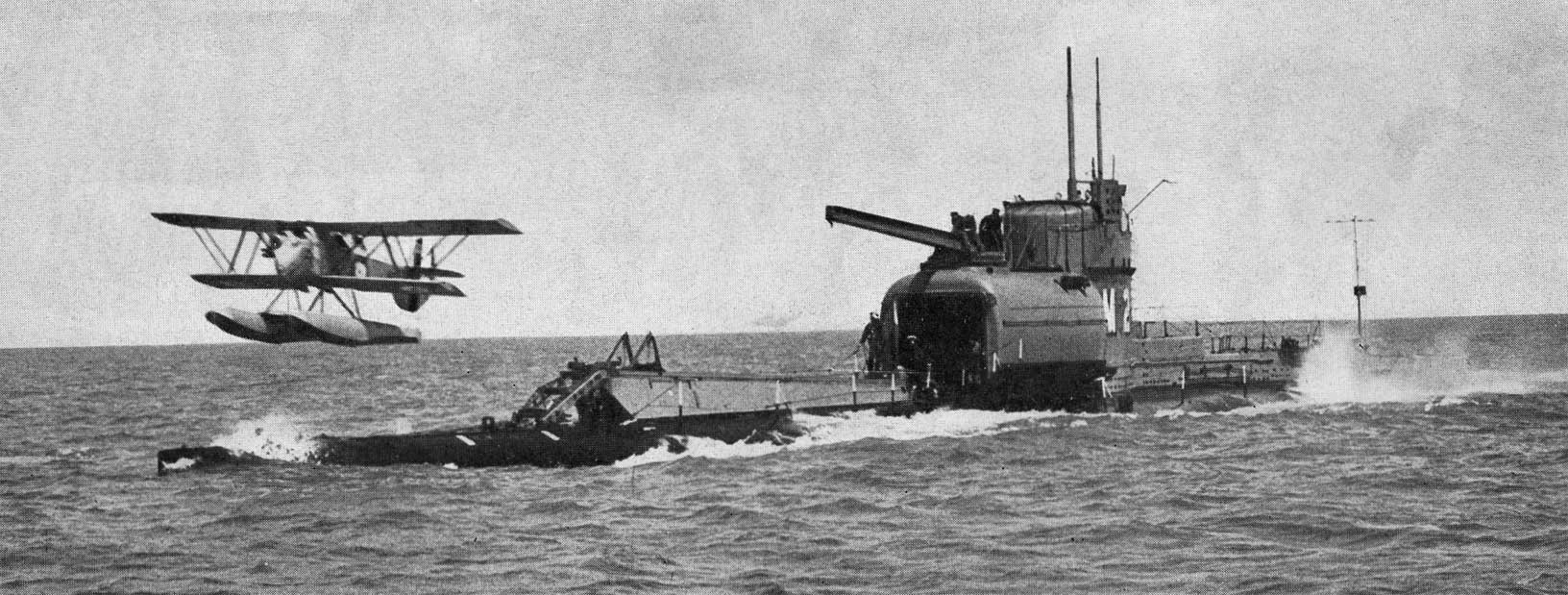
HMS M2 launches a specially designed Parnall Peto seaplane. It sank accidentally in 1932.

Various new submarine designs were developed during the interwar years. Among the most notable were submarine aircraft carriers, equipped with a waterproof hangar and steam catapult to launch and recover one or more small seaplanes. The submarine and its plane could then act as a reconnaissance unit ahead of the fleet, an essential role at a time when radar was not available. The first example was the British HMS M2, followed by the French Surcouf, and numerous aircraft-carrying submarines in the Imperial Japanese Navy.

Early submarine designs put the diesel engine and the electric motor on the same shaft, which also drove a propeller with clutches between each of them. This allowed the engine to drive the electric motor as a generator to recharge the batteries and also propel the submarine as required. The clutch between the motor and the engine would be disengaged when the boat dived so that the motor could be used to turn the propeller. The motor could have more than one armature on the shaft – these would be electrically coupled in series for slow speed and parallel for high speed (known as "group down" and "group up" respectively).

In the 1930s, the principle was modified for some submarine designs, particularly those of the U.S. Navy and the British U class. The engine was no longer attached to the motor/propeller drive shaft, but drove a separate generator, which would drive the motors on the surface and/or recharge the batteries. This diesel-electric propulsion allowed much more flexibility. For example, the submarine could travel slowly whilst the engines were running at full power to recharge the batteries as quickly as possible, reducing time on the surface, or use of its snorkel. Also, it was now possible to insulate the noisy diesel engines from the pressure hull, making the submarine quieter.

An early form of anaerobic propulsion had already been employed by the Ictíneo II in 1864. The engine used a chemical mix containing a peroxide compound, which generated heat for steam propulsion while at the same time solved the problem of oxygen renovation in an hermetic container for breathing purposes. This system was not employed again until 1940 when the German Navy tested a system employing the same principles, the Walter turbine, on the experimental submarine V-80 and later on the naval U-791.

At the end of the Second World War, the British and Russians experimented with hydrogen peroxide/kerosene (paraffin) engines, which could be used both above and below the surface. The results were not encouraging enough for this technique to be adopted at the time, although the Russians deployed a class of submarines with this engine type code named Quebec by NATO. They were considered a failure. Today, several navies, notably Sweden, use air-independent propulsion boats, which substitute liquid oxygen for hydrogen peroxide.

== Nuclear propulsion and missile platforms ==
For further information on nuclear powered submarines, see Nuclear submarine.

The first launch of a cruise missile (SSM-N-8 Regulus) from a submarine occurred in July 1953 from the deck of USS Tunny, a World War II fleet boat modified to carry this missile with a nuclear warhead. Tunny and her sister boat USS Barbero were the United States' first nuclear deterrent patrol submarines. They were joined in 1958 by two purpose-built Regulus submarines, USS Grayback, USS Growler, and, later, by the nuclear-powered USS Halibut. So that no target would be left uncovered, four Regulus missiles had to be at sea at any given time. Thus, Barbero and Tunny, each of which carried two Regulus missiles, patrolled simultaneously. Growler and Grayback, with four missiles, or Halibut, with five, could patrol alone. These five submarines made 40 Regulus strategic deterrent patrols between October 1959 and July 1964. They were replaced by the introduction of a greatly superior system beginning in 1961: the Polaris missile launched from nuclear-powered ballistic missile submarines (SSBNs). The Soviet Navy developed submarine-launched ballistic missiles launched from conventional submarines a few years before the US, and paralleled subsequent US development in this area.

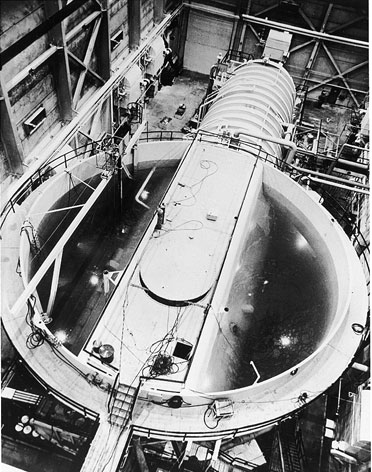
USN Nautilus's reactor core prototype at a facility in Idaho.

In the 1950s, nuclear power partially replaced diesel-electric propulsion. The sailing of the first nuclear-powered submarine, the USN Nautilus in 1955 was soon followed by similar British, French and Russian boats. Equipment was also developed to extract oxygen from sea water. These two innovations, together with inertial navigation systems, gave submarines the ability to remain submerged for weeks or months, and enabled previously impossible voyages such as the crossing of the North Pole beneath the Arctic ice cap by the USS Nautilus in 1958. Most of the naval submarines built since that time in the United States and the Soviet Union and its successor state the Russian Federation have been powered by nuclear reactors. The limiting factors in submerged endurance for these vessels are food supply and crew morale in the space-limited submarine.

The Soviet Navy attempted to use a very advanced lead cooled fast reactor on Project 705 "Lira" (NATO Alfa class) beginning in the 1970s, but its maintenance was considered too expensive, and only six submarines of this class were completed. By removing the requirement for atmospheric oxygen all nuclear-powered submarines can stay submerged indefinitely so long as food supplies remain (air is recycled and fresh water distilled from seawater). These vessels always have a small battery and diesel generator installation for emergency use when the reactors have to be shut down.

While the greater endurance and performance of nuclear reactors mean that nuclear submarines are better for long distance missions or the protection of a carrier battle-force, both countries that do and countries that do not use nuclear power continue to produce conventional diesel-electric submarines, because they can be made stealthier, except when required to run the diesel engine to recharge the ship's battery. Technological advances in sound dampening, noise isolation and cancellation have substantially eroded this advantage. Though far less capable regarding speed and weapons payload, conventional submarines are also cheaper to build. The introduction of air-independent propulsion boats led to increased sales numbers of such types of submarines.

In 1958 the USN carried out a series of trials with the USS Albacore. Various hull and control configurations were tested to reduce drag and so allow greater underwater speed and maneuverability. The results of these trials were incorporated into the Skipjack class and later submarines. From the same era is the first SSBN, the USS George Washington.

== Recent ==
The German Type 212 submarine was the first series production submarine to use fuel cells for air-independent propulsion. It is powered by nine 34-kilowatt hydrogen fuel cells.

Most small modern commercial submarines that are not expected to operate independently and use batteries that can be recharged by a mother-ship after every dive.

Towards the end of the 20th century, some submarines were fitted with pump-jet propulsors, instead of propellers. Although these are heavier, more expensive, and often less efficient than a propeller, they are significantly quieter, giving an important tactical advantage.

A possible propulsion system for submarines is the magnetohydrodynamic drive, or "caterpillar drive", which has no moving parts. It was popularized in the movie version of The Hunt for Red October, written by Tom Clancy, which portrayed it as a virtually silent system. (In the book, a form of propulsor was used rather than an MHD.) Although some experimental surface ships have been built with this propulsion system, speeds have not been as high as hoped. In addition, the noise created by bubbles, and the higher power settings a submarine's reactor would need, mean that it is unlikely to be considered for any military purpose.

== Associated technology ==
=== Sensors ===
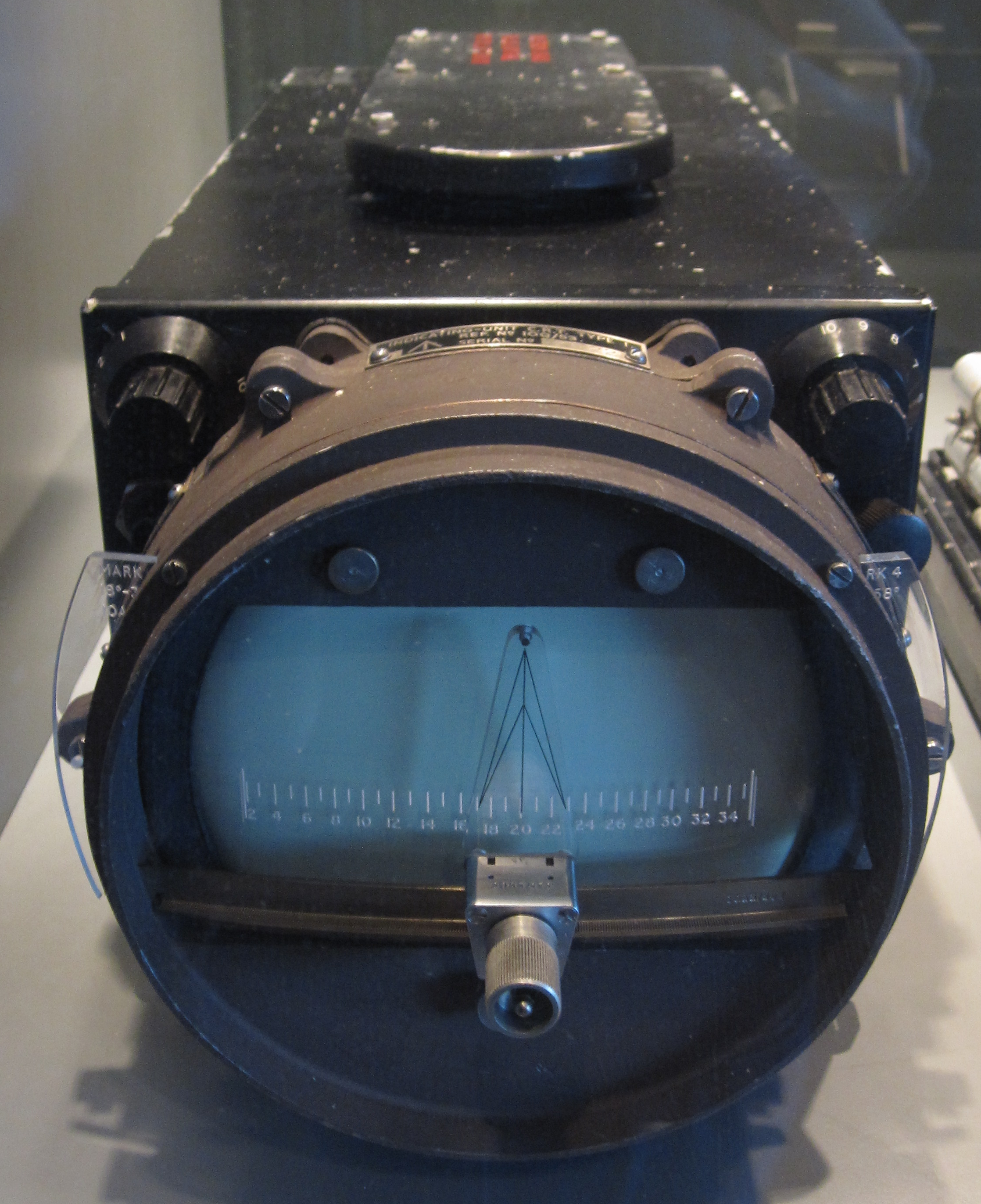
An ASDIC display unit, 1944.

The first submarines had only a porthole to provide a view to aid navigation. An early periscope was patented by Simon Lake in 1893. The modern periscope was developed by the industrialist Sir Howard Grubb in the early 20th century and was fitted onto most Royal Navy designs.

Passive sonar was introduced in submarines during the First World War, but active sonar ASDIC did not come into service until the inter-war period. Today, the submarine may have a wide variety of sonar arrays, from bow-mounted to trailing ones. There are often upward-looking under-ice sonars as well as depth sounders.

Early experiments with the use of sound to 'echo locate' underwater in the same way as bats use sound for aerial navigation began in the late 19th century. The first patent for an underwater echo ranging device was filed by English meteorologist Lewis Fry Richardson a month after the sinking of the Titanic. The First World War stimulated research in this area. The British made early use of underwater hydrophones, while the French physicist Paul Langevin worked on the development of active sound devices for detecting submarines in 1915 using quartz.

In 1916, under the British Board of Invention and Research, Canadian physicist Robert William Boyle took on the active sound detection project with A B Wood, producing a prototype for testing in mid-1917. This work, for the Anti-Submarine Division of the British Naval Staff, was undertaken in utmost secrecy, and used quartz piezoelectric crystals to produce the world's first practical underwater active sound detection apparatus.

By 1918, both France and Britain had built prototype active systems. The British tested their ASDIC on HMS Antrim in 1920, and started production in 1922. The 6th Destroyer Flotilla had ASDIC-equipped vessels in 1923. An anti-submarine school, HMS Osprey, and a training flotilla of four vessels were established on the English Isle of Portland in 1924. The US Sonar QB set arrived in 1931.

=== Weapons and countermeasures ===
Early submarines carried torpedoes mounted externally to the craft. Later designs incorporated the weapons into the internal structure of the submarine. Originally, both bow-mounted and stern-mounted tubes were used, but the latter eventually fell out of favour. Today, only bow-mounted installations are employed. The modern submarine is capable of firing many types of weapon from its launch tubes, including UAVs. Special mine laying submarines were also built. Up until the end of the Second World War, it was common to fit deck guns to submarines to allow them to sink ships without wasting their limited numbers of torpedoes.

To aid in the weapons targeting mechanical calculators were employed to improve the fire control of the on-board weaponry. The firing calculus was determined by the targets' course and speed through measurements of the angle and its range via the periscope. Today, these calculations are achieved by digital computers with display screens providing necessary information on the torpedo status and ship status.

German submarines in World War II had rubber coatings and could launch chemical devices to provide a decoy when the boat came under attack. These proved to be ineffective, as sonar operators learned to distinguish between the decoy and the submarine. Modern submarines can launch a variety of devices for the same purpose.

=== Safety ===
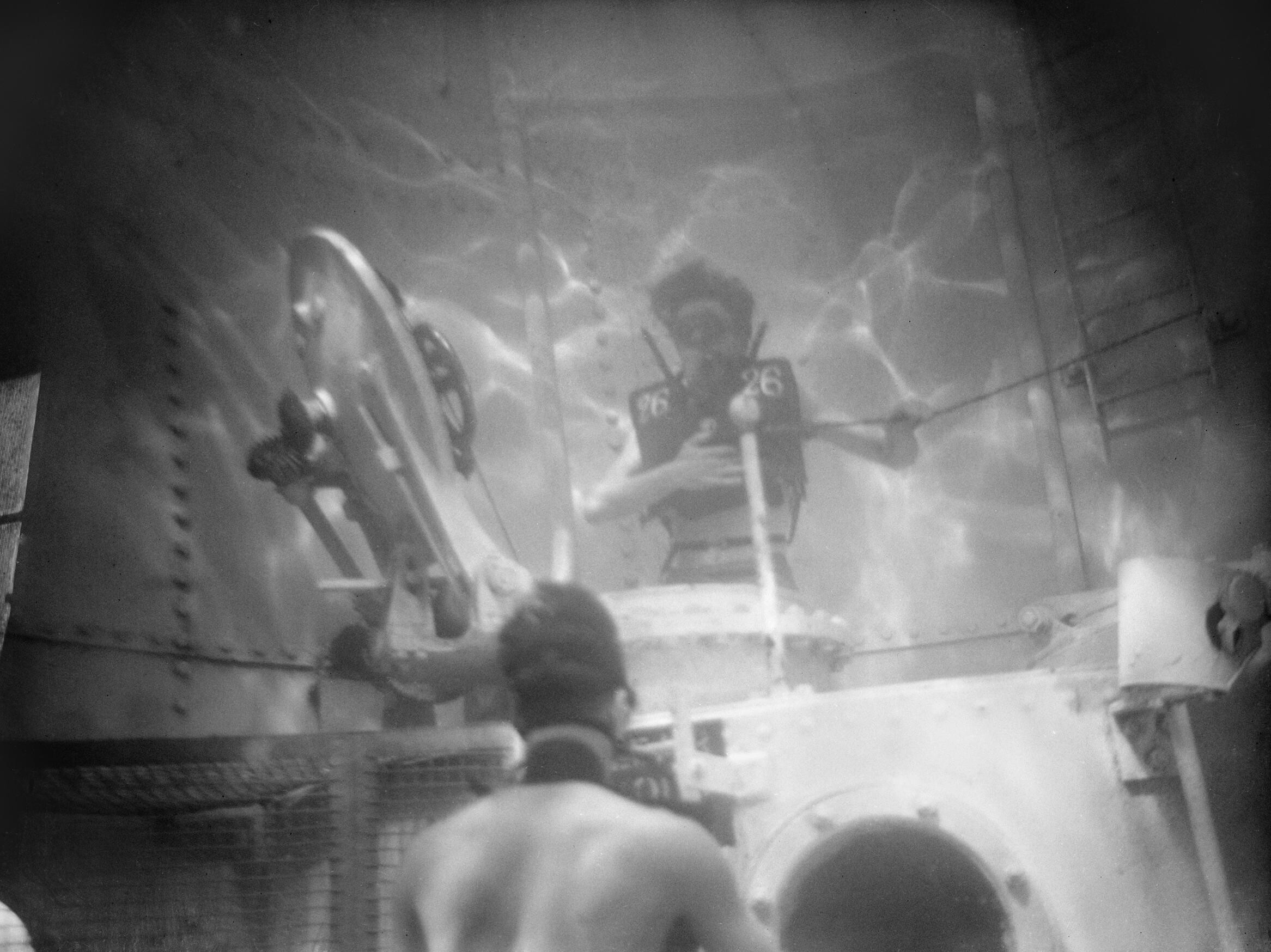
Davis breathing apparatus tested at the submarine escape test tank at HMS Dolphin, Gosport, December 1942

After the sinking of the A1 submarine in 1904, lifting eyes were fitted to British submarines, and in 1908 air-locks and escape helmets were provided. The Royal Navy experimented with various types of escape apparatus, but it was not until 1924 that the "Davis Submerged Escape Apparatus" was developed for crew members. The USN used the similar "Momsen Lung". The French used "Joubert's apparatus" and the Germans used "Draeger's apparatus".

Rescue submarines for evacuating a disabled submarine's crew were developed in the 1970s. A British unmanned vehicle was used for recovering an entangled Russian submarine crew in 2005. A new NATO Submarine Rescue System entered service in 2007.

=== Communication and navigation ===
Wireless was used to provide communication to and from submarines in the First World War. The D-class submarine was the first submarine class to be fitted with wireless transmitters in 1907. With time, the type, range and bandwidth of the communications systems have increased. With the danger of interception, transmissions by a submarine are minimised. Various periscope-mounted aerials have been developed to allow communication without surfacing.

The standard navigation system for early submarines was by eye, with use of a compass. The gyrocompass was introduced in the early part of the 20th century and inertial navigation in the 1950s. The use of satellite navigation is of limited use to submarines, except at periscope depth or when surfaced.

== Military ==
The first military submarine was Turtle in 1776. During the American Revolutionary War, Turtle (operated by Sgt. Ezra Lee, Continental Army) tried and failed to sink a British warship, HMS Eagle (flagship of the blockaders) in New York harbor on 7 September 1776. There is no record of any attack in the ships' logs.

During the War of 1812, in 1814 Silas Halsey died while using a submarine in an unsuccessful attack on a British warship stationed in New London harbour.

=== American Civil War ===
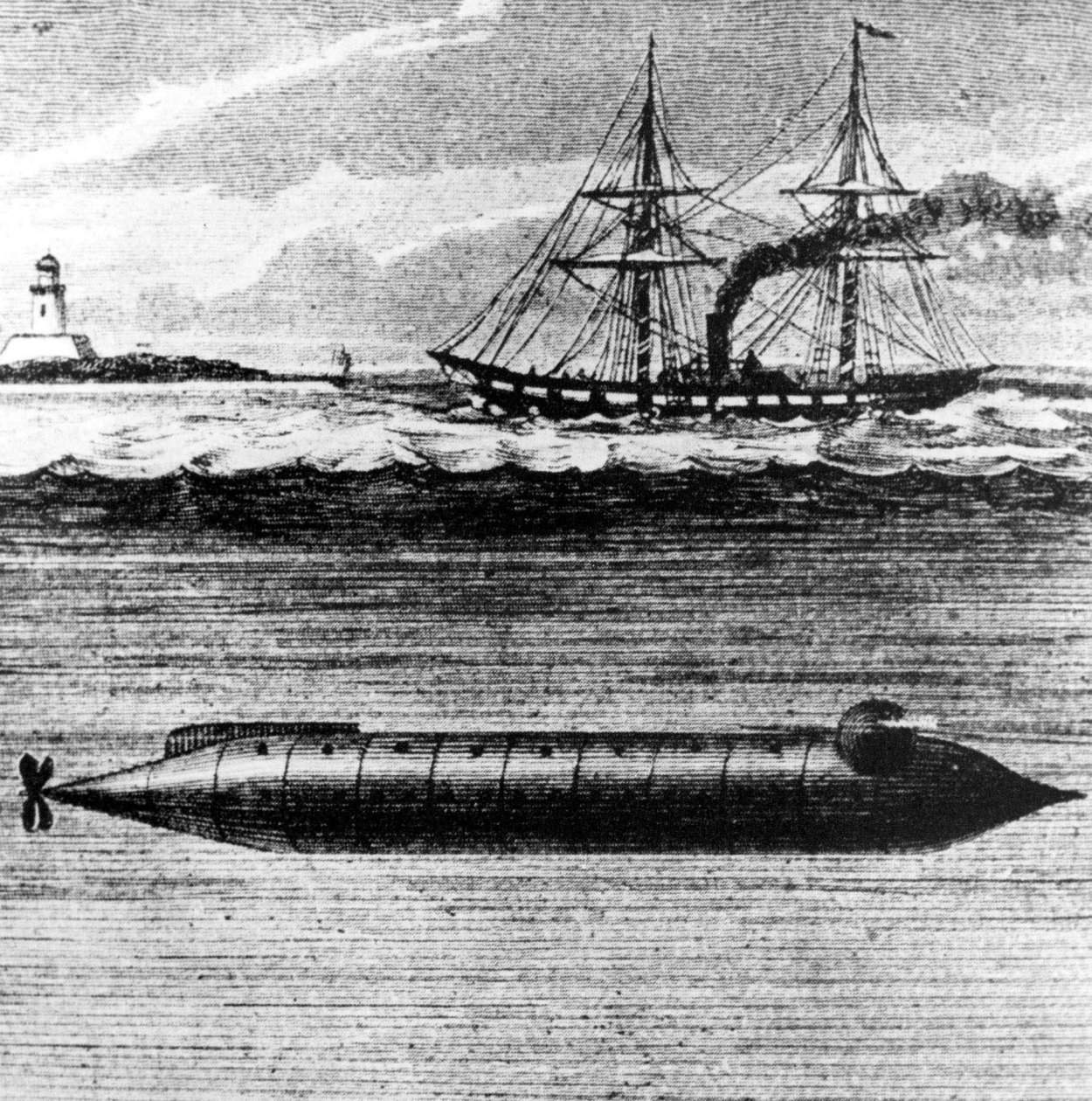
The French-designed 1862 Alligator, first submarine of the U.S. Navy.

During the American Civil War, the Union was the first to field a submarine. The French-designed Alligator was the first U.S. Navy sub and the first to feature compressed air (for air supply) and an air filtration system. It was the first submarine to carry a diver lock, which allowed a diver to plant electrically detonated mines on enemy ships. Initially hand-powered by oars, it was converted after 6 months to a screw propeller powered by a hand crank. With a crew of 20, it was larger than Confederate submarines. Alligator was 47 feet (14 m) long and about 4 feet (1.2 m) in diameter. It was lost in a storm off Cape Hatteras on 1 April 1863 while uncrewed and under tow to its first combat deployment at Charleston.

The Intelligent Whale was built by Oliver Halstead and tested by the U.S. Navy after the American Civil War.

The Confederate States of America fielded several human-powered submarines, including the H. L. Hunley (named for its designer and chief financier, Horace Lawson Hunley). The first Confederate submarine was the 30-foot-long (9.1 m) Pioneer, which sank a target schooner using a towed mine during tests on Lake Pontchartrain, but it was not used in combat. It was scuttled after New Orleans was captured and in 1868 was sold for scrap. The similar Bayou St. John submarine is preserved in the Louisiana State Museum. The Hunley was intended for attacking Union ships that were blockading Confederate seaports. The submarine had a long pole with an explosive charge in the bow, called a spar torpedo.

The sub had to approach an enemy vessel, attach the explosive, move away, and then detonate it. It was extremely hazardous to operate, and had no air supply other than what was contained inside the main compartment. On two occasions, the sub sank; on the first occasion half the crew died, and on the second, the entire eight-man crew (including Hunley himself) drowned. On 17 February 1864, Hunley sank USS Housatonic off the Charleston Harbor, the first time a submarine successfully sank another ship, though it sank in the same engagement shortly after signalling its success. Submarines did not have a major impact on the outcome of the war, but did portend their coming importance to naval warfare and increased interest in their use in naval warfare.

=== Russo-Japanese War ===
On 14 June 1904, the Imperial Japanese Navy (IJN) placed an order for five Holland Type VII submersibles, which were built in Quincy, Massachusetts, at the Fore River Yard, and shipped to Yokohama, Japan in sections. The five machines arrived on 12 December 1904. Under the supervision of naval architect Arthur L. Busch, the imported Hollands were re-assembled, and the first submersibles were ready for combat operations by August 1905, but hostilities were nearing the end by that date, and no submarines saw action during the war.

Meanwhile, the Imperial Russian Navy (IRN) purchased German constructed submersibles built by the Germaniawerft shipyards out of Kiel. In 1903, Germany successfully completed its first fully functional engine-powered submarine, Forelle (Trout), It was sold to Russia in 1904 and shipped via the Trans-Siberian Railway to the combat zone during the Russo-Japanese War.

Due to the naval blockade of Port Arthur, Russia sent their remaining submarines to Vladivostok, and by the end of 1904, seven subs were based there. On 1 January 1905, the IRN created the world's first operational submarine fleet around these seven submarines. The first combat patrol by the newly created IRN submarine fleet occurred on 14 February 1905, and was carried out by Delfin and Som, with each patrol normally lasting about 24 hours. Som first made contact with the enemy on 29 April, when it was fired upon by IJN torpedo boats, which withdrew shortly after opening fire and resulting in no casualties or damage to either combatant. A second contact occurred on 1 July 1905 in the Tartar Strait when two IJN torpedo boats spotted the IRN sub Keta. Unable to submerge quickly enough, Keta was unable to obtain a proper firing position, and both combatants broke contact.

=== World War I ===
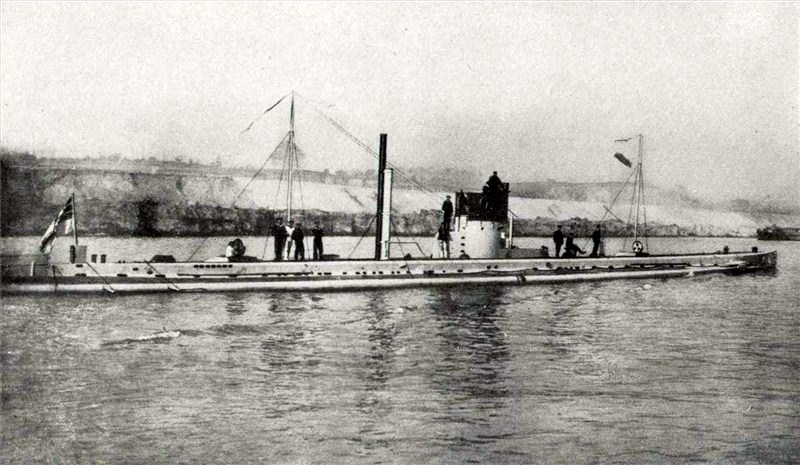
German submarine U9 in 1910. It sank three British cruisers in a few minutes in September 1914.

The first time military submarines had significant impact on a war was in World War I. Forces such as the U-boats of Germany operated against Allied commerce (Handelskrieg); the submarine's ability to function as a practical war machine relied on new tactics, their numbers, and submarine technologies such as combination diesel/electric power system that had been developed in the preceding years. More like submersible ships than the submarines of today, submarines operated primarily on the surface using standard engines, submerging occasionally to attack under battery power. They were roughly triangular in cross-section, with a distinct keel, to control rolling while surfaced, and a distinct bow.

Shortly before the outbreak of World War I, submarines were employed by the Italian Regia Marina during the Italo-Turkish War without seeing any naval action, and by the Greek Navy during the Balkan Wars, where notably the French-built Delfin became the first such vessel to launch a torpedo against an enemy ship (albeit unsuccessfully).

At the start of the war, Germany had 48 submarines in service or under construction, with 29 operational. These included vessels of the diesel-engined U-19 class with the range (5,000 nautical miles, 9,300 km, 5,800 mi) and speed (8 knots, 15 km/h, 9.2 mph) to operate effectively around the entire British coast. Initially, Germany followed the international "Prize Rules", which required a ship's crew to be allowed to leave before sinking their ship. The U-boats saw action in the First Battle of the Atlantic.

After the British ordered transport ships to act as auxiliary cruisers, the German navy adopted unrestricted submarine warfare, generally giving no warning of an attack. During the war, 360 submarines were built, but 178 were lost. The rest were surrendered at the end of the war. A German U-boat sunk RMS Lusitania and is often cited among the reasons for the entry of the United States into the war.

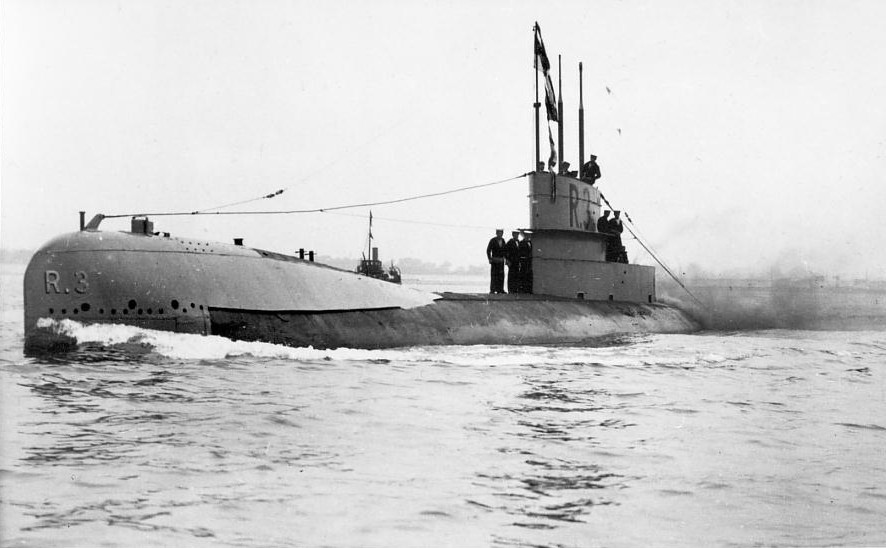
R3 at sea. The R class was the first hunter-killer design, capable of destroying enemy submarines.

In August 1914, a flotilla of ten U-boats sailed from their base in Heligoland to attack Royal Navy warships in the North Sea in the first submarine war patrol in history. Their aim was to sink capital ships of the British Grand Fleet, and so reduce the Grand Fleet's numerical superiority over the German High Seas Fleet. Depending more on luck than strategy, the first sortie was not a success. Only one attack was carried out, when U-15 fired a torpedo (which missed) at HMS Monarch, while two of the ten U-boats were lost.

The SM U-9 had better luck. On 22 September 1914 while patrolling the Broad Fourteens, a region of the southern North Sea, U-9 found three obsolescent British Cressy-class armoured cruisers (HMS Aboukir, Hogue, and Cressy), which were assigned to prevent German surface vessels from entering the eastern end of the English Channel. The U-9 fired all six of its torpedoes, reloading while submerged, and sank the three cruisers in less than an hour.

The British had 77 operational submarines at the beginning of the war, with 15 under construction. The main type was the E class, but several experimental designs were built, including the K class, which had a reputation for bad luck, and the M class, which had a large deck-mounted gun. The R class was the first boat designed to attack other submarines. British submarines operated in the Baltic, North Sea and Atlantic, as well as in the Mediterranean and Black Sea. Over 50 were lost from various causes during the war.

France had 62 submarines at the beginning of the war, in 14 different classes. They operated mainly in the Mediterranean; in the course of the war, 12 were lost. The Russians started the war with 58 submarines in service or under construction. The main class was the Bars class with 24 boats. Twenty-four submarines were lost during the war.

=== World War II ===
==== Germany ====
Although Germany was banned from having submarines in the Treaty of Versailles, construction started in secret during the 1930s. When this became known, the Anglo-German Naval Agreement of 1936 allowed Germany to achieve parity in submarines with Britain.

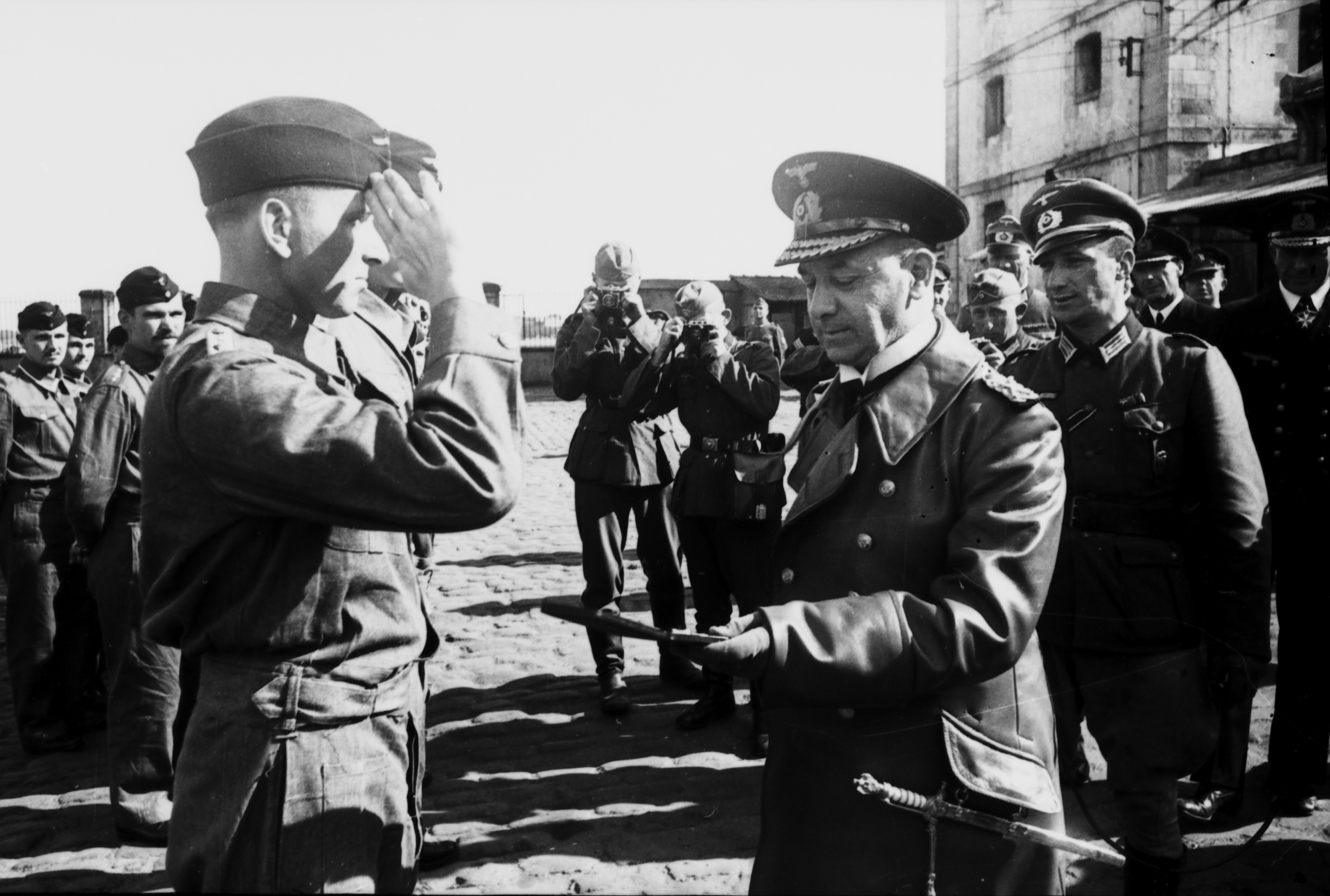
Grand Admiral Erich Raeder with Otto Kretschmer (left), a German U-boat commander, August 1940

Germany started the war with only 65 submarines, with 21 at sea when war broke out. Germany soon built the largest submarine fleet during World War II. Due to the Treaty of Versailles limiting the surface navy, the rebuilding of the German surface forces had only begun in earnest a year before the outbreak of World War II. Having no hope of defeating the vastly superior Royal Navy decisively in a surface battle, the German High Command planned on fighting a campaign of "Guerre de course" (Merchant warfare). They immediately stopped all construction on capital surface ships, except the nearly completed Bismarck-class battleships and two cruisers, and switched the resources to submarines, which could be built more quickly. Though it took most of 1940 to expand production facilities and to start mass production, more than a thousand submarines were built by the end of the war.

Germany used submarines to devastating effect in World War II during the Battle of the Atlantic, attempting but ultimately failing to cut off Britain's supply routes by sinking more ships than Britain could replace. The supply lines were vital to Britain for food and industry, as well as armaments from Canada and the United States. Although the U-boats had been updated in the intervening years, the major innovation was improved communications, encrypted using the famous Enigma cipher machine. This allowed for mass-attack tactics or "wolfpacks" (Rudel), but was also ultimately the U-boats' downfall.

After putting to sea, the U-boats operated mostly on their own, trying to find convoys in areas assigned to them by the High Command. If a convoy was found, the submarine did not attack immediately, but shadowed the convoy and radioed to the German Command to allow other submarines in the area to find the convoy. The submarines were then grouped into a larger striking force and attacked the convoy simultaneously, preferably at night while surfaced to avoid the ASDIC.

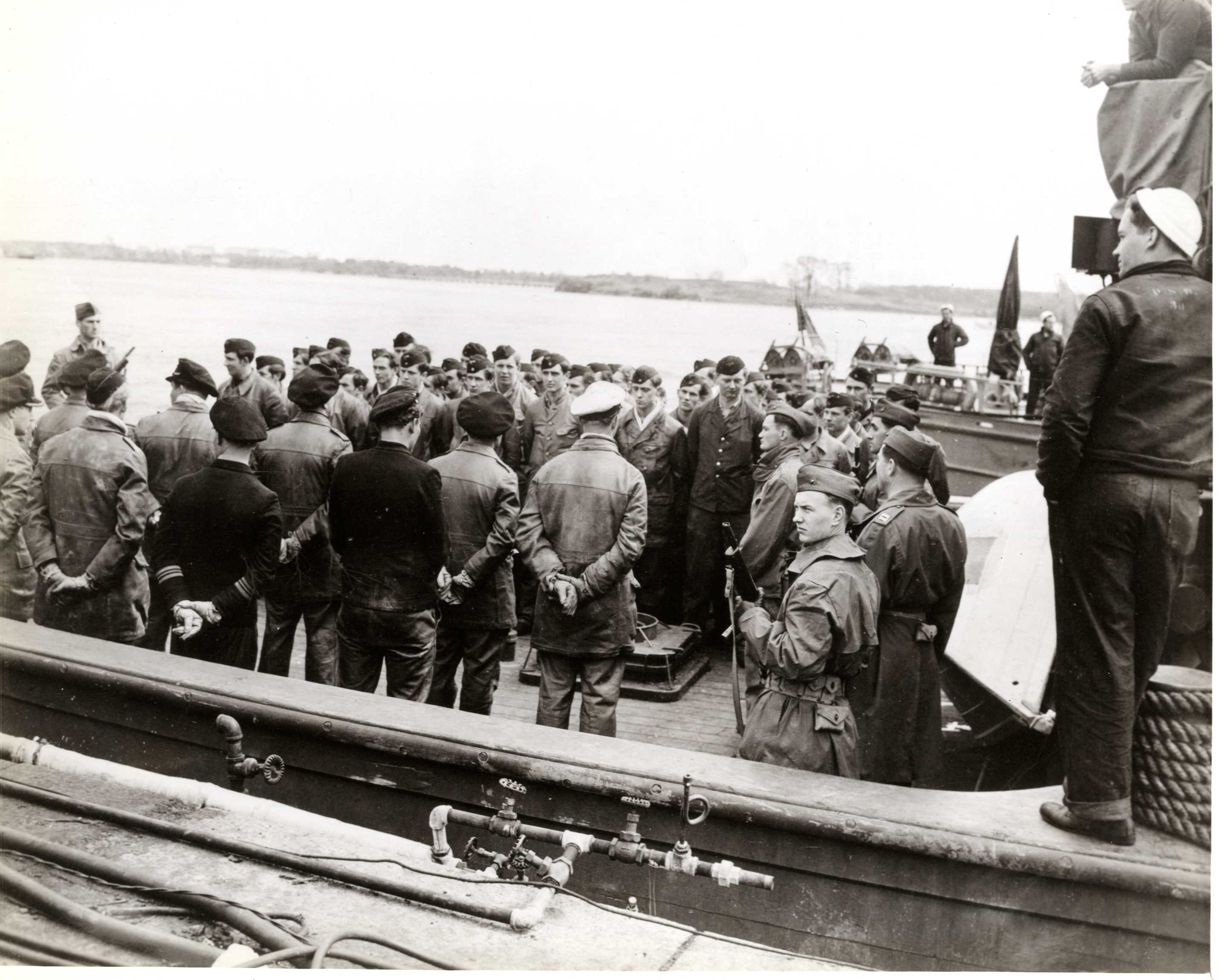
German Prisoners from U-873 at the Portsmouth Navy Yard in New Hampshire, May 1945

During the first few years of World War II, the Ubootwaffe ("U-boat force") scored unprecedented success with these tactics ("First Happy Time"), but were too few to have any decisive success. By the spring of 1943, German U-boat construction was at full capacity, but this was more than nullified by increased numbers of convoy escorts and aircraft, as well as technical advances like radar and sonar. High Frequency Direction Finding (HF/DF, known as Huff-Duff) and Ultra allowed the Allies to route convoys around wolfpacks when they detected radio transmissions from trailing boats.

The results were devastating: from March to July of 1943, over 130 U-boats were lost, 41 in May alone. Concurrent Allied losses dropped dramatically, from 750,000 tons in March to 188,000 in July. Although the Battle of the Atlantic continued to the last day of the war, the U-boat arm was unable to stem the tide of personnel and supplies, paving the way for Operation Torch, Operation Husky, and ultimately, D-Day. Winston Churchill wrote the U-boat "peril" was the only thing to ever give him cause to doubt eventual Allied victory.

By the end of the war, almost 3,000 Allied ships (175 warships, 2,825 merchantmen) were sunk by U-boats. Of the 40,000 men in the U-boat service, 28,000 (70%) died.

The Germans built some novel submarine designs, including the Type XVII, which used hydrogen peroxide in a Walther turbine (named for its designer, Dr Hellmuth Walther) for propulsion. They also produced the Type XXII, which had a large battery and mechanical torpedo handling.

==== Italy ====
Italy had 116 submarines in service at the start of the war, with 24 different classes. These operated mainly in the Mediterranean theatre. Some were sent to a base at Bordeaux in Occupied France. A flotilla of several submarines also operated out of the Eritrean colonial port of Massawa.

Italian designs proved to be unsuitable for use in the Atlantic Ocean. Italian midget submarines were used in attacks against British shipping near the port of Gibraltar.

==== Britain ====
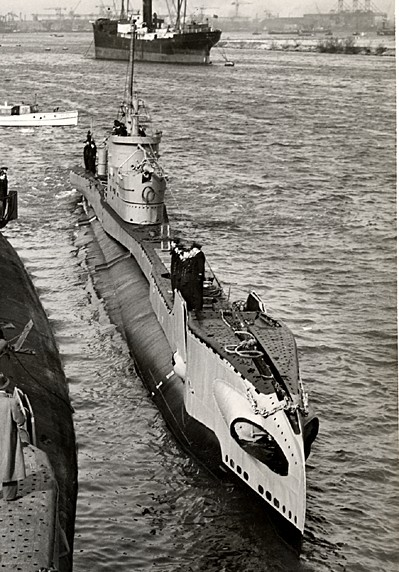
HMS Taurus of the T class.

The Royal Navy Submarine Service had 70 operational submarines in 1939. Three classes were selected for mass production, the seagoing S class and the oceangoing T class, as well as the coastal U class. All of these classes were built in large numbers during the war.

The French submarine fleet consisted of over 70 vessels (with some under construction) at the beginning of the war. After the Fall of France, the French-German Armistice required the return of all French submarines to German-controlled ports in France. Some of these submarines were forcibly seized by British forces.

The main operating theatres for British submarines were off the coast of Norway, in the Mediterranean, where a flotilla of submarines successfully disrupted the Axis replenishment route to North Africa from their base in Malta, as well as in the North Sea. As Germany was a Continental power, there was little opportunity for the British to sink German shipping in this theatre of the Atlantic.

From 1940, U-class submarines were stationed at Malta, to interdict enemy supplies bound for North Africa. Over a period of three years, this force sank over 1 million tons of shipping, and fatally undermined the attempts of the German High Command to adequately support General Erwin Rommel. Rommel's Chief of Staff, Fritz Bayerlein conceded that "We would have taken Alexandria and reached the Suez Canal, if it had not been for the work of your submarines". 45 vessels were lost during this campaign, and five Victoria Crosses were awarded to submariners serving in this theatre.

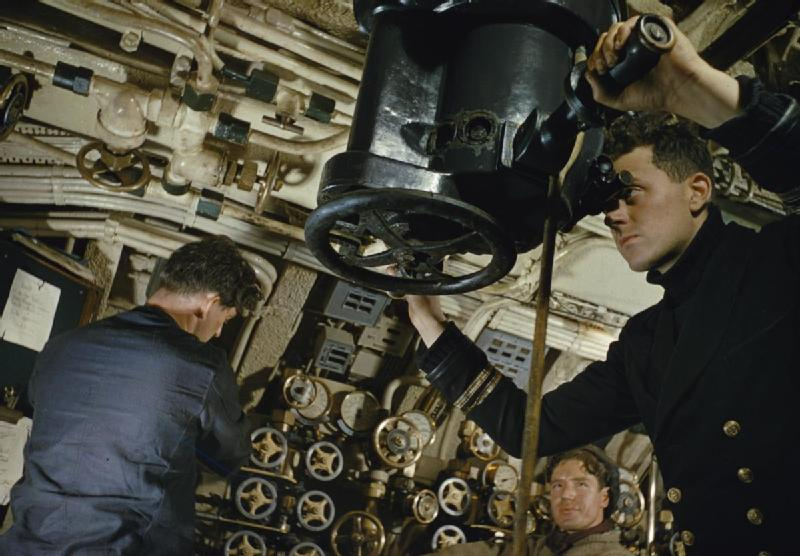
On board HMS Tribune in 1942

In addition, British submarines attacked Japanese shipping in the Far East, during the Pacific campaign. The Eastern Fleet was responsible for submarine operations in the Bay of Bengal, Strait of Malacca as far as Singapore, and the western coast of Sumatra to the Equator. Few large Japanese cargo ships operated in this area, and the British submarines' main targets were small craft operating in inshore waters.

The submarines were deployed to conduct reconnaissance, interdict Japanese supplies travelling to Burma, and attack U-boats operating from Penang. The Eastern Fleet's submarine force continued to expand during 1944, and by October 1944 had sunk a cruiser, three submarines, six small naval vessels, 40,000 long tons (41,000 t) of merchant ships, and nearly 100 small vessels.

In this theatre, the only documented instance of a submarine sinking another submarine while both were submerged occurred. HMS Venturer engaged the U864 and the Venturer crew manually computed a successful firing solution against a three-dimensionally maneuvering target using techniques which became the basis of modern torpedo computer targeting systems.

By March 1945, British boats had gained control of the Strait of Malacca, preventing any supplies from reaching the Japanese forces in Burma by sea. By this time, there were few large Japanese ships in the region, and the submarines mainly operated against small ships which they attacked with their deck guns. The submarine HMS Trenchant torpedoed and sank the heavy cruiser Ashigara in the Bangka Strait, taking down some 1,200 Japanese army troops. Three British submarines (HMS Stonehenge, Stratagem, and Porpoise) were sunk by the Japanese during the war.

==== Japan ====
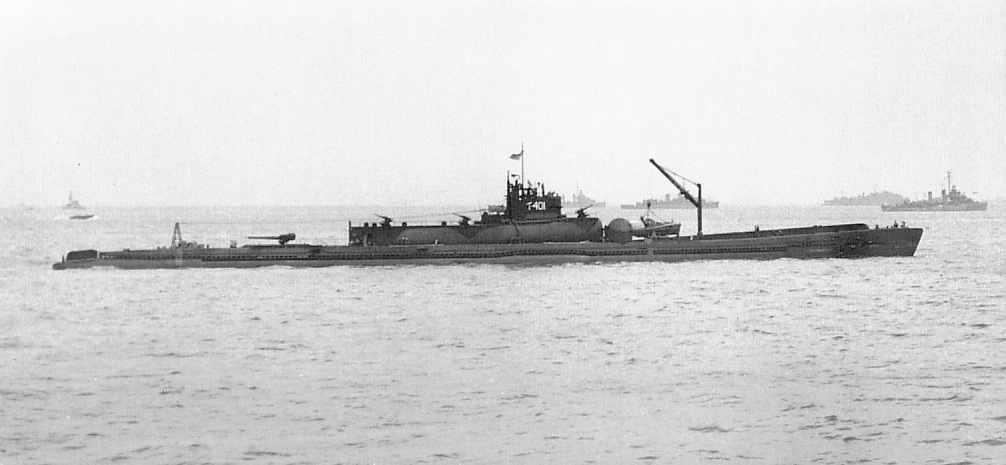
A Japanese I-400-class submarine, the largest submarine built in World War II.

Japan had the most varied fleet of submarines of World War II, including manned torpedoes (Kaiten), midget submarines (Ko-hyoteki, Kairyu), medium-range submarines, purpose-built supply submarines (many for use by the Army), long-range fleet submarines (many of which carried an aircraft), submarines with the highest submerged speeds of the conflict (Sentaka I-200), and submarines that could carry multiple aircraft (World War II's largest submarine, the Sentoku I-400). These submarines were also equipped with the most advanced torpedo of the conflict, the oxygen-propelled Type 95 (what U.S. historian Samuel E. Morison postwar called "Long Lance").

Overall, despite their technical prowess, Japanese submarines – having been incorporated into the Imperial Navy's war plan of "Guerre D' Escadre" (Fleet Warfare), in contrast to Germany's war plan of "Guerre De Course" – were relatively unsuccessful. Japanese submarines were primarily used in offensive roles against warships, which were fast, maneuverable and well-defended compared to merchant ships. In 1942, Japanese submarines sank two fleet aircraft carriers, one cruiser, and several destroyers and other warships, and damaged many others, including two battleships.

They were not able to sustain these results afterward, as Allied fleets were reinforced and became better organized. By the end of the war, submarines were instead often used to transport supplies to island garrisons. During the war, Japan managed to sink about 1 million tons of merchant shipping (184 ships), compared to 1.5 million tons for Great Britain (493 ships), 4.65 million tons for the U.S. (1,079 ships) and 14.3 million tons for Germany (2,840 ships).

Early models were not very maneuverable underwater, could not dive very deep, and lacked radar. Later in the war, units that were fitted with radar were in some instances sunk due to the ability of U.S. radar sets to detect their emissions. For example, USS Batfish sank three such equipped submarines in the span of four days. After the war, several of Japan's most original submarines were sent to Hawaii for inspection in "Operation Road's End" (I-400, I-401, I-201 and I-203) before being scuttled by the U.S. Navy in 1946, when the Soviets demanded access to the submarines as well.

==== United States ====
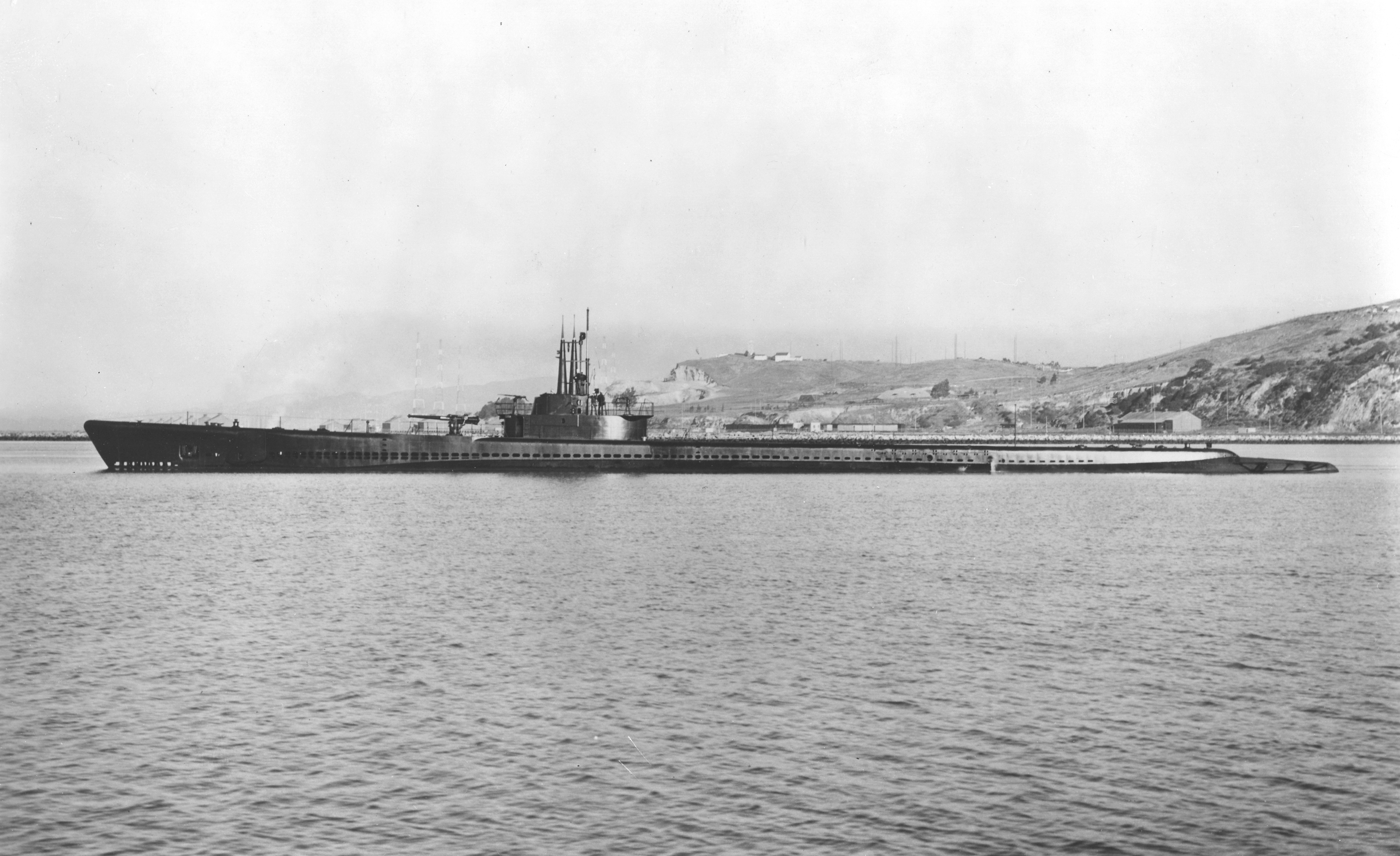
Tang off Mare Island in 1943.

After the attack on Pearl Harbor, many of the U.S. Navy's front-line Pacific Fleet surface ships were destroyed or severely damaged. The submarines survived the attack and carried the war to the enemy. Lacking support vessels, the submarines were asked to independently hunt and destroy Japanese ships and submarines. They did so very effectively.

During World War II, the submarine force was the most effective anti-ship and anti-submarine weapon in the entire American arsenal. Submarines, at about 2 percent of the U.S. Navy, destroyed over 30 percent of the Japanese Navy, including 8 aircraft carriers, 1 battleship and 11 cruisers. U.S. submarines destroyed over 60 percent of the Japanese merchant fleet, crippling Japan's ability to supply its military forces and industrial war effort. Allied submarines in the Pacific War destroyed more Japanese shipping than all other weapons combined. This feat was considerably aided by the Imperial Japanese Navy's failure to provide adequate escort forces for Japan's merchant fleet.

Whereas Japanese submarine torpedoes of the war are considered the best, those of U.S. Navy are considered the worst. For example, the U.S. Mark 14 torpedo typically ran 10 feet (3.0 m) too deep and was tipped with a Mk VI exploder, with both magnetic influence and contact features, neither reliable. The faulty depth control mechanism of the Mark 14 was corrected in August 1942. Field trials for the exploders were ordered in mid-1943, when tests in Hawaii and Australia confirmed the flaws. The Mark 14 sometimes suffered circular runs, which sank at least one U.S. submarine, Tullibee.

Fully operational Mark 14 torpedoes were put in service in September 1943. The Mark 15 torpedo used by U.S. surface combatants had the same Mk VI exploder and were fixed in late 1943. One attempt to correct the problems resulted in a wakeless, electric torpedo (the Mark 18) being placed in submarine service. Tang was lost to a circular run by one of these torpedoes. Given the prevalence of circular runs, there were probably other losses among boats which simply disappeared.

During World War II, 314 submarines served in the United States Navy, of which nearly 260 were deployed to the Pacific. On 7 December 1941, 111 boats were in commission. 203 submarines of the Gato, Balao, and Tench classes were commissioned during the war. During the war, 52 US submarines were lost to all causes, with 48 directly due to hostilities. 3,505 sailors were lost, the highest percentage killed in action of any US service arm in World War II.

U.S. submarines sank 1,560 enemy vessels, a total tonnage of 5.3 million tons, 55% of the total sunk, including 8 aircraft carriers, a battleship, three heavy cruisers, and over 200 other warships, and damaged several other ships including the battleships Yamato (badly damaged by USS Skate) and Musashi (damaged by USS Tunny). The Japanese merchant marine lost 16,200 sailors killed and 53,400 wounded, of some 122,000 at the start of the war, due to submarines.

=== Post-War ===
During the Cold War, the United States and the Soviet Union maintained large submarine fleets that engaged in cat-and-mouse games. This continues today, on a much-reduced scale. The Soviet Union suffered the loss of at least four submarines during this period: K-129 was lost in 1968 (which the CIA attempted to retrieve from the ocean floor with the Howard Hughes-designed ship named Glomar Explorer), K-8 in 1970, K-219 in 1986, and Komsomolets in 1989. Many other Soviet subs, such as K-19 were badly damaged by fire or radiation leaks. The United States lost two nuclear submarines during this time: USS Thresher and Scorpion. The Thresher was lost due to equipment failure, and the exact cause of the loss of the Scorpion is not known.

During the Indo-Pakistani War of 1971, PNS Hangor became the first conventional submarine to sink a ship since WW2. During the same war PNS Ghazi sank under unknown circumstances. This was the first submarine casualty in the South Asian region.

The United Kingdom employed nuclear-powered submarines against Argentina during the 1982 Falklands War. The sinking of the cruiser ARA General Belgrano by HMS Conqueror was the first sinking by a nuclear-powered submarine in war. During this conflict, the conventional Argentinian submarine ARA Santa Fé was disabled by a Sea Skua missile, and the ARA San Luis claimed to have made unsuccessful attacks on the British fleet.

During the 2026 Iran war, USS Charlotte became the first US submarine to sink an enemy vessel with a torpedo since the Pacific theater of World War II, and the second nuclear submarine to do so in history.

== Major incidents ==
There have been a number of accidental sinkings, but also some collisions between submarines. Up to August 1914, there were 68 submarine accidents. There were 23 collisions, 7 battery gas explosions, 12 gasoline explosions, and 13 sinkings due to hull openings not being closed. HMS Affray was lost in the English Channel in 1951 due to the snort mast fracturing. USS Thresher was lost in 1963 due to a pipe weld failure during a test dive. Many other scenarios have been proven to be probable causes of sinking, most notably a battery malfunction causing a torpedo to detonate internally, and the loss of the Russian Kursk in August 2000, probably due to a torpedo explosion. An example of the latter was the incident between the Russian K-276 and the USS Baton Rouge in February 1992.

Since 2000, there have been 9 major naval incidents involving submarines. There were three Russian submarine incidents, in two of which the submarines in question were lost, along with three United States submarine incidents, one Chinese incident, one Canadian, and one Australian incident. In August 2005, AS-28, a Russian Priz-class rescue submarine, was trapped by cables and/or nets off of Petropavlovsk, and saved when a British ROV cut them free in a massive international effort.

== See also ==
- List of submarine actions
- List of submarine museums
- List of sunken nuclear submarines
- Depth charge and Depth charge (cocktail)
- Nuclear navy
- Nuclear submarine
- Attack submarine
- List of countries with submarines

=== Vessels ===
- Nerwin (NR-1)
- Vesikko (museum submarine)
- ORP Orzeł
- Ships named Nautilus
- List of submarines of the Royal Navy
- List of submarines of the United States Navy
- List of Soviet submarines
- List of U-boats of Germany
- Kaikō ROV (deepest submarine dive)
- Bathyscaphe Trieste (deepest manned dive)

=== Classes ===
- List of submarine classes
- List of submarine classes of the Royal Navy
- List of Soviet and Russian submarine classes
- List of United States submarine classes
