= Karl Flach =

German engineer (1821–1866)

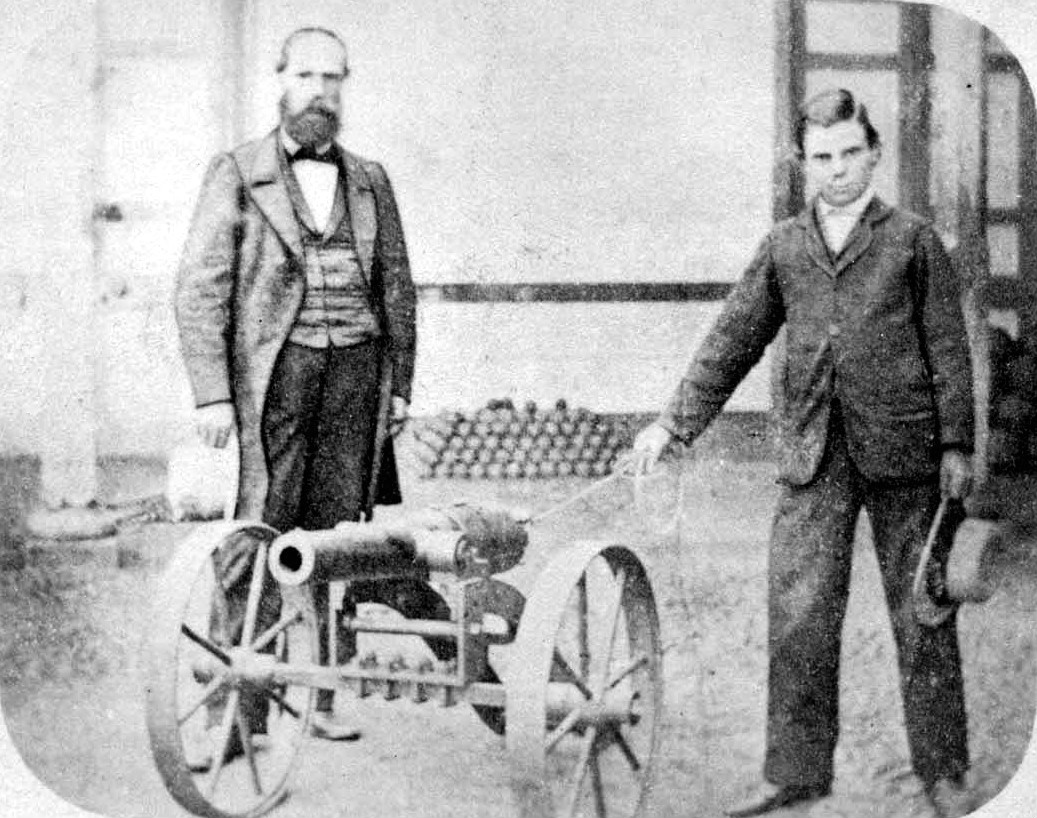
Karl Flach and his son

Karl Flach (Villmar, 15 August 1821 - Bay of Valparaíso, 3 May 1866) was a German mechanic and engineer who designed and built the Flach, the first Chilean submarine.

== Biography ==
Born Johann Anton Flach, he was the son of watchmaker Heinrich Flach and his wife Margaretha. According to another version, originated in the studies of one of his great-grandchildren, Guillermo Stegen Ahumada, his birth name was Gottfried Cornelius. He was forced to change his identity to Karl Flach, the name of a deceased man, after his failed participation in the 1848 revolution that tried to overthrow the Kaiser.

With his wife and son Heinrich (Enrique) Flach, he traveled on the sailboat Australia from Hamburg to Chile on 3 April 1852, where upon arrival he called himself Karl August Flach.

In 1865 and 1866 Karl Flach designed and built the submarine Flach, powered by the force of the crew members and equipped with two guns. The submarine was 12.5 metres (41 ft) long and 2.5 metres (8 ft 2 in) wide, with a speed of 2 knots (3.7 km/h; 2.3 mph) to 3 knots (5.6 km/h; 3.5 mph). The crew was made up of Flach and his 16-year-old son, two Chileans (Adolfo Pulgar and Francisco Rodríguez), five Germans (Valentín Baum, Gustavo Maas, Augusto Warmuth, German Schmidt and Luis Grinewinke) and two French people, totalling 11 people. The submarine had been commissioned by the Chilean government of José Joaquín Pérez who wanted to oppose the Spanish in the Chincha Islands War following the Bombardment of Valparaíso. The submarine, with Karl Flach as captain, carried out several successful test and dive trips. On 3 May 1866, the submarine made a dive without warning. The submarine sank in the Bay of Valparaíso with its eleven-member crew. Rescue attempts were unsuccessful.

In 2018, the wreck of the submarine was allegedly found.
