= Flach (submarine) =

1866 Chilean submarine

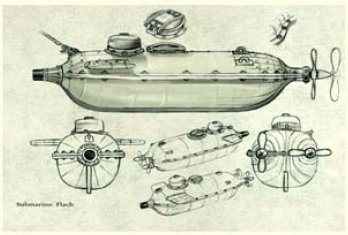

History

Chile
- Name: Flach
- Laid down: 1866
- Fate: Sank in Valparaiso bay on May 3, 1866

General characteristics
- Displacement: ~50 tons
- Length: 12.5 m (41 ft)
- Beam: 2.5 m (8.2 ft)
- Propulsion: pedals
- Complement: 11
- Armament: 2 cannons

Flach was the first submarine designed and built in Chile in 1866. It was lost on a test run the same year, and is believed to lie on the seabed of the bay of Valparaíso.

== History ==
The Flach was built in 1866 at the request of the Chilean government, by Karl Flach, a German engineer and immigrant. It was the fifth submarine built in the world and, along with a second submarine, was intended to defend the port of Valparaíso against attack by the Spanish navy during the Chincha Islands War. (The second vessel, built by Gustavo Heyermann, sank on its maiden voyage.)

=== Loss ===
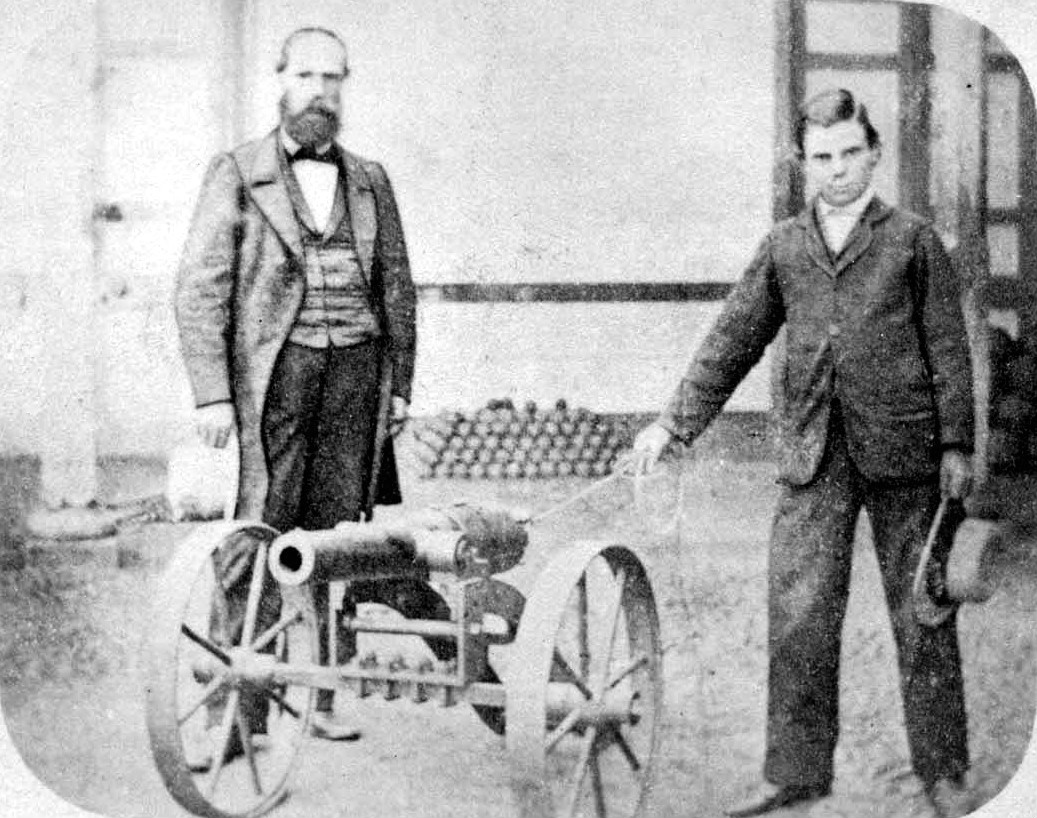
Karl Flach and his son

On 3 May 1866, after several days of successful testing, Karl Flach, his 16-year-old son, and nine other Chilean and German crewmen boarded the submarine for another test run. During the test, the submarine sank for unknown reasons; it is now thought to lie at a depth of about 50 meters (164 feet) within the bay of Valparaíso. The Flach was located two days after the sinking by seamen from the English frigate HMS Leander, and a diver named John Wallace was able to see and draw the wreck, which was buried nose-down in the bay's sediment.

=== Present location ===
The Chilean Navy, with support from others, has searched for the submarine and intends to raise it after finding it, even though there is as yet no agreement on what to do with the remains of the eleven bodies thought to be inside. A finding of an object that appears to be the Flach was reported in El Mercurio de Valparaiso on 25 April 2007. However, the finding has not been confirmed, because, as of August 2007, sediment still has to be cleared away from the object.

== See also ==
- H. L. Hunley (CSA submarine)
- Plongeur (French submarine)
- Toro Submarino (Peruvian submarine)
