= List of shipwrecks in March 1883 =

The list of shipwrecks in March 1883 includes ships sunk, foundered, grounded, or otherwise lost during March 1883.

== 2 March ==
List of shipwrecks: 2 March 1883
Ship	State	Description
Kron Prinz	Germany	The steamship collided with the steamship Arandhu (United Kingdom) and sank in the Atlantic Ocean. Her crew were rescued by Arandhu. 'Kron Prinz was on a voyage from Glasgow, Renfrewshire, United Kingdom to Saigon, French Indo-China.

== 3 March ==
List of shipwrecks: 3 March 1883
Ship	State	Description
Lodore	United Kingdom	The ship departed from Moulmein, Burma for a European port. No further trace, reported missing.

== 4 March ==
List of shipwrecks: 4 March 1883
Ship	State	Description
Glenroy	United Kingdom	The barque foundered 15 nautical miles (28 km) west of the South Stack, Anglesey. Her crew survived. She was on a voyage from Glasgow, Renfrewshire to Buenos Aires, Argentina.
Ruth	United Kingdom	The smack struck the Rattray Briggs, off the coast of Aberdeenshire and foundered. Her crew survived.
Yazoo	United States	The steamship struck a drifting log and sank in the Mississippi River with the loss of twenty of the 31 people on board.

== 5 March ==
List of shipwrecks: 5 March 1883
Ship	State	Description
Ariel Patterson	United States	The pilot boat was sunk in a collision with Commonwealth (United States). The pilot was killed.
Asia	United Kingdom	The steamship departed from Middlesbrough, Yorkshire for Liverpool, Lancashire. No further trace, reported overdue.
Fervent	United Kingdom	The steamship departed from the River Tyne for London. No further trace, reported overdue.
H. D. Pochin	United Kingdom	The steamship departed from West Hartlepool, County Durham for Wismar, Germany. No further trace, reported overdue.
Leamington	United Kingdom	The ship departed from Pensacola, Florida, United States for Liverpool, Lancashire. No further trace, reported missing.

== 6 March ==
List of shipwrecks: 6 March 1883
Ship	State	Description
Abeona	United Kingdom	The schooner ran aground at Slipper Point, Cornwall and was beached at Padstow. She was on a voyage from Padstow to Swansea, Glamorgan.
Active	United Kingdom	The fishing yawl was driven ashore at Scarborough, North Riding of Yorkshire. Her crew were rescued.
Alice G. Wonson	United States	The fishing schooner was lost in Boston Harbor, Massachusetts. Her crew were rescued.
Annie	United Kingdom	The ship was abandoned off Thurso, Caithness. Her crew were rescued by the Thurso Lifeboat.
Catherine Marr	United Kingdom	The schooner ran aground at Bangor, County Antrim and became waterlogged.
Emerald Isle	United Kingdom	The fishing smack was driven ashore and wrecked at Ramsey, Isle of Man. Her crew were rescued by the Ramsey Lifeboat Two Sisters ( Royal National Lifeboat Institution).
Emmanuel	United Kingdom	The steamship collided with the steamship James Shaw (United Kingdom) and sank in the River Tees.
Governor Loch	United Kingdom	The ship was abandoned off Thurso. Her crew were rescued by the Thurso Lifeboat.
Hephzibah	United Kingdom	The ship was driven ashore and wrecked on rocks at "Pennyland", near Thurso. Her five crew were rescued by the Thurso Lifeboat. She was on a voyage from Caernarfon to Newcastle upon Tyne, Northumberland.
Maiden Queen	United Kingdom	The ship was driven ashore and wrecked at Scarborough. Her crew were rescued.
Major	United Kingdom	The Yorkshire Billyboy collided with Gem of the Ocean (United Kingdom) and sank in the River Thames at Woolwich, Kent.
Marie Stewart	United Kingdom	The steamship foundered in the North Sea after 5 March. She was on a voyage from Leith, Lothian to Dunkirk, Nord, France. Wreckage washed ashore at Whitby, Yorkshire.
Mary Tweedlie	United Kingdom	The ketch ran aground and was wrecked off Lindisfarne, Northumberland with the loss of one of her three crew. Survivors were rescued by the Lindisfarne Lifeboat.
Matchless	United Kingdom	The ship was wrecked at Atwick, Yorkshire. She was on a voyage from Seaham, County Durham to London.
May Bird	United Kingdom	The steam trawler was driven ashore and wrecked at Scarborough. Her crew were rescued by rocket apparatus.
Mayflower	United Kingdom	The Humber Keel was driven ashore and wrecked 1 nautical mile (1.9 km) south of the Stallingborough Lighthouse, Lincolnshire. Her crew were rescued.
Naiad	United Kingdom	The sloop was driven ashore and wrecked at Fierceness, Eday, Orkney Islands. Her crew were rescued.
Navarre	United Kingdom	The steamship was disabled by a gale on 5 March and foundered the next day on the Little Fish Bank, in the North Sea. Carrying 81 people, including 50 migrants, she sank before assistance could arrive; 60 people lost their lives. One person was rescued by the smack Florence and Louise, five peeple were rescued by the smack George Killick, and five people were rescued by the smack Sir Stafford Northcote(all United Kingdom). Ten crew were rescued by a Dutch fishing smack.
Peri	United Kingdom	The smack foundered in the North Sea. Her crew were rescued by the smack John Macey (United Kingdom).
Royal Consort	United Kingdom	The crewless ship was driven onto the Boick Rock, off Port Dinorwic, Caernarfonshire and was wrecked.
Vesta	Norway	The ship was driven ashore and wrecked at IJmuiden, North Holland, Netherlands with the loss of her captain. She was on a voyage from Santos, Brazil to Hamburg, Germany.
William and Martha	United Kingdom	The ship was abandoned off Thurso. Her crew were rescued by the Thurso Lifeboat. She was on a voyage from Thurso to Barrow-in-Furness, Lancashire.
Willing Mind	United Kingdom	The ketch was driven ashore and wrecked at Whitby. Her crew were rescued by rocket apparatus.
Unnamed	United Kingdom	The schooner was driven ashore and wrecked at Fraserburgh, Aberdeenshire.
Unnamed	United Kingdom	The fishing smack foundered in the North Sea with the loss of all hands, six or seven lives.

== 7 March ==
List of shipwrecks: 7 March 1883
Ship	State	Description
Bremen	Germany	The steamship was wrecked in the Strait of Messina. All on board were rescued by the steamships Alfredo Cappellini and Leon (both Italy). Bremen was on a voyage from Palermo to Riposto, Sicily, Italy.
Ingomar	United Kingdom	The barque was abandoned in the Pacific Ocean 30 nautical miles (56 km) west of Cape Horn, Chile. Her nine crew were rescued by Lord Kinnaird (United Kingdom). Ingomar was on a voyage from San Francisco, California, United States to Calais, France.
J. W. Sawyer	United States	The schooner was wrecked on Black Ledge, at Bar Harbor, Maine. Three crew were drowned trying to reach Black Ledge. The rest of her crew made it to the ledge, and were rescued on 9 March.
Leon Jamie	France	The fishing boat struck the pier at Dover, Kent, United Kingdom and was beached in a waterlogged condition.
Rogate	Norway	The barque was abandoned in the Dogger Bank. Her crew were rescued by a fishing smack. Rogate was on a voyage from Korsør, Denmark to Kinsale, County Cork, United Kingdom. She was subsequently towed in to Grimsby, Lincolnshire, United Kingdom.
Vicuna	United Kingdom	The ship was driven ashore at Holme-next-the-Sea, Norfolk. Her nine crew were rescued by the Hunstanton Lifeboat.

== 8 March ==
List of shipwrecks: 8 March 1883
Ship	State	Description
Albert Edward	United Kingdom	The steamship ran aground in the Solent off Southsea, Hampshire. Her passengers were taken off by tugs. She was on a voyage from Portsmouth, Hampshire to Ryde, Isle of Wight. She was refloated and taken in to a harbour.
Buenos Ayrean	United Kingdom	The steamship ran aground in the Clyde between Port Glasgow, Renfrewshire and Bowlin, Dunbartonshire. She was refloated.
Circassia	United Kingdom	The steamship ran aground in the Clyde between Bowling and Port Glasgow.
Deepdale	United Kingdom	The steamship ran aground in the Clyde between Port Glasgow and Bowling. She was refloated.
Devonia	United Kingdom	The steamship ran aground in the Clyde between Port Glasgow and Bowling. She was refloated.
Hamburg	Germany	The barque was wrecked on a sandbank in the North Sea off the coast of Nord, France. She was on a voyage from Hamburg to Zanzibar.
Manitoban	United Kingdom	The steamship ran aground in the Clyde between Bowling and Port Glasgow.
Margaret	Norway	The barque was driven ashore and wrecked between Brancaster and Thornham, Norfolk, United Kingdom. Her crew were rescued. She was on a voyage from Christiania to Dover, Kent, United Kingdom.
Nithsdale	United Kingdom	The steamship ran aground in the Clyde between Port Glasgow and Bowling.
SS State of Pennsylvania	United Kingdom	The steamship ran aground in the Clyde between Bowling and Port Glasgow.

== 9 March ==
List of shipwrecks: 9 March 1883
Ship	State	Description
Clan Sinclair, and Margaret	United Kingdom	The steamships collided in the River Thames at Blackwall, Middlesex. Margaret sank. She was on a voyage from Grangemouth, Stirlingshire to London. Margaret was refloated on 18 March and taken in to drydock. Clan Sinclair was severely damaged. She was on a voyage from London to Liverpool, Lancashire and Calcutta, India. She put back to London.
Orpheus	United Kingdom	The steamship collided with the tug Despatch (United Kingdom) and sank in the River Mersey. Orpheus was on a voyage from Liverpool to Birkenhead, Cheshire. She was refloated and taken in to Birkenhead.
Pacific	United Kingdom	The schooner was severely damaged by fire at Galway with the loss of a crew member.
Parklands	United Kingdom	The steamship ran aground at Moulmein, Burma. She was on a voyage from Aden, Aden Settlement to Elephant Point, Burma.
Reclam	Germany	The kuff was abandoned in the North Sea. She came ashore at the Orfordness Lighthouse, Suffolk, United Kingdom.

== 10 March ==
List of shipwrecks: 10 March 1883
Ship	State	Description
Thomas Adams	United Kingdom	The steamship collided with another vessel in the North Sea. She was on a voyage from South Shields, County Durham to Almería, Spain. She put in to Gravesend, Kent.

== 11 March ==
List of shipwrecks: 11 March 1883
Ship	State	Description
Dunelm	United Kingdom	The steam collier collided with HMS Penelope (Royal Navy) at Sheerness, Kent and was severely damaged. Dunelm put in to Rochester, Kent.
Triton	United Kingdom	The steamship ran aground at Gallipoli, Ottoman Empire. She was on a voyage from Odesa, Russia to Falmouth, Cornwall.

== 12 March ==
List of shipwrecks: 12 March 1883
Ship	State	Description
Ary Scheffer	Netherlands	The steamship sprang a leak and sank 25 nautical miles (46 km) south by east of the North Foreland, Kent, United Kingdom with the loss of four of her fourteen crew. Survivors were rescued by the steamship Stanley (United Kingdom).
Atlas	Norway	The schooner was wrecked on the Longscar Rocks, on the coast of County Durham, United Kingdom. Her five crew were rescued by the Seaton Carew lifeboat Job Hindley. She was on a voyage from Drammen to Sunderland, County Durham with a cargo of ice.
Echo	United Kingdom	The ketch struck the wreck of the steamship Teesdale (United Kingdom) and sank of Yarmouth, Isle of Wight. Her four crew survived. Echo was on a voyage from The Needles, Isle of Wight to Emsworth, Hampshire.

== 13 March ==
List of shipwrecks: 13 March 1883
Ship	State	Description
Cyprus	United Kingdom	The ship departed from Newcastle, New South Wales for Bangkok, Siam. No further trace,. reported missing.
Stadacona	United Kingdom	The ship departed from Pensacola, Florida, United States for Newport, Monmouthshire. No further trace, reported missing.

== 14 March ==
List of shipwrecks: 14 March 1883
Ship	State	Description
Amalia and Hedwig	Germany	The barque was abandoned in the Atlantic Ocean. Her crew were rescued by the steamship Sculptor (United Kingdom). Amalia and Hedwig was on a voyage from Newport, Monmouthshire, United Kingdom to the Cape Verde Islands.
Dora Cabler	United States	The steamship was sunk in a collision with the steamship Engineer (United States). One crewman was killed.

== 15 March ==
List of shipwrecks: 15 March 1883
Ship	State	Description
Hannah	(United Kingdom of Great Britain and Ireland) Guernsey	The brig foundered in the English Channel 20 nautical miles (37 km) north east of Les Casquets, off Guernsey. Her crew were rescued. She was on a voyage from Guernsey to London.
To Brodre	Sweden	The ship departed from Falkenberg for Bo'ness, Lothian, United Kingdom. No further trace, reported overdue.

== 16 March ==
List of shipwrecks: 16 March 1883
Ship	State	Description
Punch	United Kingdom	The dandy was driven ashore and wrecked at the Birling Gap, Sussex. She was on a voyage from Newhaven to the Birling Gap.
Wansfell	United Kingdom	The steamship ran aground at Belfast, County Antrim and became waterlogged. She was on a voyage from Ayr to Larne, County Antrim.

== 17 March ==
List of shipwrecks: 17 March 1883
Ship	State	Description
Dunstaffnage	United Kingdom	The ship was driven ashore and wrecked 8 to 10 nautical miles (15 to 19 km) south of Aberdeen with the loss of all 23 crew. She was being towed from Dundee, Forfarshire to Liverpool, Lancashire by the tug Recovery (United Kingdom).
John Bertram	United States	The extreme clipper was abandoned in the Atlantic Ocean. Her crew were rescued by the barque Oxo (Norway). John Bertram was on a voyage from New York to Rotterdam, South Holland, Netherlands.
Mazinthien	United Kingdom	The steam whaler was driven ashore and wrecked at Peterhead, Aberdeenshire. Her crew were rescued by the Coastguard. She was on a voyage from Dundee to Greenland.

== 18 March ==
List of shipwrecks: 18 March 1883
Ship	State	Description
Elsa	(Russian Empire) Grand Duchy of Finland	The barquentine was wrecked on the Black Middens, off the mouth of the River Tyne. Her crew were rescued by the Tynemouth Lifeboat. She was on a voyage from Antwerp, Belgium to the River Tyne.
Nara	Portugal	The schooner was driven ashore and wrecked at Pelotas, Brazil. She was on a voyage from Viera, Florida, United States to Pernambuco, Brazil.
Nora	Norway	The schooner was wrecked at Wilkhaven, Ross-shire, United Kingdom. Four crew were rescued.

== 19 March ==
List of shipwrecks: 19 March 1883
Ship	State	Description
Gelszein	Netherlands	The galiot was abandoned in the North Sea. Her five crew were rescued by the fishing smack Spitfire (United Kingdom).

== 20 March ==
List of shipwrecks: 20 March 1883
Ship	State	Description
Pride of Quitta	United Kingdom	The schooner was wrecked at Grand Popo, Dahomey.

== 22 March ==
List of shipwrecks: 22 March 1883
Ship	State	Description
Lagos	Germany	The steamship was wrecked at Lagos with the loss of two of her crew.

== 23 March ==
List of shipwrecks: 23 March 1883
Ship	State	Description
Aberfoyle, and Renown	United Kingdom	The steamships collided at South Shields, County Durham. Both vessels were severely damaged. Aberfoyle lost a crew member and was beached. She subsequently sank.
Clapeyron	United Kingdom	The steamship was driven ashore at Penarth, Glamorgan. She was on a voyage from Havre de Grâce, Seine-Inférieure, France to Penarth.
Cornishman	United Kingdom	The steamship ran aground at Damietta, Egypt. She was on a voyage from Cardiff, Glamorgan to Port Said, Egypt.
Orienten	Norway	The schooner was discovered derelict in the North Sea. She was beached at Great Yarmouth, Norfolk, United Kingdom.
HMS TB.73	Royal Navy	The torpedo boat sank at Portsmouth, Hampshire. She was refloated the next day.

== 24 March ==
List of shipwrecks: 24 March 1883
Ship	State	Description
Adela	France	The brig ran aground on the Newcombe Sand, in the North Sea off the coast of Norfolk, United Kingdom. She was on a voyage from Newcastle upon Tyne, Northumberland, United Kingdom to the West Indies. She was later refloated and assisted in to Lowestoft, Suffolk, United Kingdom by a tug.
Macedon	Western Australia	The steamship struck a rock and was wrecked at Rottnest Island. All on board were rescued.
Wild Rose	United Kingdom	The steamship sank at Cardiff, Glamorgan.

== 26 March ==
List of shipwrecks: 26 March 1883
Ship	State	Description
City of Rotterdam	United Kingdom	The steamship ran aground at Maassluis, South Holland, Netherlands. Her crew were rescued. She was on a voyage from Maryport, Cumberland to Rotterdam, South Holland. She broke in two on 29 March and was a total loss.
Dan	Denmark	The steamship ran aground at Saltholm. She was refloated and towed in to Copenhagen.
Ecliptic	United Kingdom	The ship departed from Dysart, Fife for Danzig, Germany. No further trace, reported missing.
Unnamed	Flag unknown	The ship capsized in the English Channel off Dymchurch, Kent, United Kingdom.

== 27 March ==
List of shipwrecks: 27 March 1883
Ship	State	Description
California	Russia	The barque was driven ashore and severely damaged at Tayabas, Spanish East Indies. She was on a voyage from Tayabas to Barcelona, Spain. She was refloated.
Castlefield	United Kingdom	The steamship ran aground near the Dog Rock, off Malta. She was on a voyage from Odesa, Russia to Liverpool, Lancashire.
Eagle	United Kingdom	The steamship foundered off St. Abbs Head, Berwickshire with the loss of three of her crew.
Julie	Germany	The brig was wrecked at Johanna, South Australia. Her crew were rescued. She was on a voyage from Mauritius to Johanna.

== 28 March ==
List of shipwrecks: 28 March 1883
Ship	State	Description
Nestor	United Kingdom	The ship was driven ashore in the Krishna River.
Unnamed	Flag unknown	The schooner collided with the barque Meropi (Netherlands) in the English Channel 10 nautical miles (19 km) south west of Dungeness, Kent, United Kingdom. Presumed foundered, nothing was seen of her after the collision.

== 30 March ==
List of shipwrecks: 30 March 1883
Ship	State	Description
Alarm	United Kingdom	The schooner was driven ashore and wrecked near Polperro, Cornwall with the loss of five of her eight crew.
Queen	United Kingdom	The schooner was wrecked near Aberdeen.
Sarah	United Kingdom	The schooner was wrecked on Rattray Briggs, off the coast of Aberdeenshire. Her crew were rescued by rocket apparatus. She was on a voyage from Sunderland, County Durham to Peterhead, Aberdeenshire.
Tom Duff	United Kingdom	The schooner was wrecked near Aberdeen.
Yanyan	United Kingdom	The steamship ran aground on the Black Middens, off the mouth of the River Tyne and was wrecked. Her crew were rescued by the Tynemouth Lifeboat. She was on a voyage from London to Dundee, Forfarshire.

== 31 March ==
List of shipwrecks: 31 March 1883
Ship	State	Description
Susan	Sweden	The abandoned schooner was discovered in the North Sea by the fishing smack Venus (United Kingdom). She was towed in to Hull, Yorkshire, United Kingdom.

== Unknown date ==
List of shipwrecks: Unknown date in March 1883
Ship	State	Description
Alarm	(United Kingdom of Great Britain and Ireland) Guernsey	The schooner was wrecked in Sandwith Bay, Cornwall with the loss of five lives.
Algonda	Norway	The schooner was abandoned in the North Sea on or before 16 March. Her crew were rescued. Shew as on a voyage from Porsgrund to West Hartlepool, County Durham, United Kingdom.
Andromeda	Sweden	The ship was wrecked at "Ulloa", British Honduras.
Angelo	Italy	The barque was driven ashore and wrecked at Cape Hatteras, North Carolina, United States. Her crew survived. She was on a voyage from Cartagena, Spain to Baltimore, Maryland, United States.
Avondale	United Kingdom	The steamship was driven ashore and wrecked on the coast of Nova Scotia, Canada. She was on a voyage from "Coosaw" to London.
Brothers	United Kingdom	The barque was driven ashore and wrecked near Barrington, Nova Scotia. She was on a voyage from Holyhead, Anglesey to Yarmouth, Nova Scotia.
Carnaquheen	United Kingdom	The barque was abandoned in the Atlantic Ocean before 29 March. Her crew were rescued by the barque Harmonia (Portugal). Carnaquheen was on a voyage from Newport, Monmouthshire to Montevideo, Uruguay.
Ceara	Germany	The ship ran aground on the Gelbsand and sank. She was on a voyage from Africa to Harburg.
City of Lincoln	United Kingdom	The steamship was driven ashore at New York. She had been refloated by 14 April.
Dea	Italy	The barque was abandoned in the Adriatic Sea. Her crew survived. She was subsequently towed in to Fiume, Austria-Hungary by the steamship Prinz Heinrich (Germany).
Dee	United Kingdom	The schooner was wrecked on the coast of Mozambique. The wreck was plundered by the local inhabitants.
De Concey	United Kingdom	The barque was driven ashore on Santa Rosa Island, Florida, United States.
Edith	United Kingdom	The steam trawler departed from Scarborough, Yorkshire in early March. No further trace, presumed foundered with the loss of all five crew.
Emmanuel	United Kingdom	The schooner was driven ashore and wrecked 5 nautical miles (9.3 km) south of Scarborough. Her crew were rescued. She was on a voyage from Husum, Germany to a Scottish port.
Galilei	Denmark	The barque was wrecked at Lemvig. Her crew were rescued. She was on a voyage from Leith, Lothian, United Kingdom to Copenhagen.
Gesina	Germany	The galiot foundered at sea. Her crew survived. She was on a voyage from Hamburg to Perth, United Kingdom.
Globe	United Kingdom	The barquentine ran aground on the Middle Ground, off the coast of Sierra Leone before 24 March. She was on a voyage from Liverpool, Lancashire to Sierra Leone.
Ho Hoang	United Kingdom	The schooner was driven ashore at Flamborough Head, Yorkshire. Her crew were rescued by a fishing vessel. She was on a voyage from London to Fraserburgh, Aberdeenshire.
Ifigenia	Austria-Hungary	The barque foundered at sea before 10 March. Her crew were rescued by the barque Mirzapore (France).
Ihana	Russia	The barque ran aground at Key West, Florida, United States. She was on a voyage from Pascagoula, Mississippi, United States to Brake, Germany.
Jane Grey	United Kingdom	The barque was driven ashore and wrecked at Tunis, Tunisia before 17 March. Her crew were rescued.
Johan Brolin	Sweden	The ship was wrecked at "Little Manga". She was on a voyage from Haiti to Havre de Grâce, Seine-Inférieure, France.
Klio	Germany	The barque was driven ashore and wrecked at Thisted, Denmark.
Lady of Avenel	United Kingdom	The ship ran aground on the Middle Mouse. She was on a voyage from Runcorn, Cheshire to Newcastle upon Tyne, Northumberland. She was refloated and towed in to Holyhead, Anglesey.
Maasvinding	Netherlands	The fishing smack was abandoned in the North Sea with the loss of six of her twelve crew. Survivors were rescued by Emerald (United Kingdom), which lost a crew member effecting the rescue. Maasvinding was subsequently towed in to Great Yarmouth, Norfolk, United Kingdom in a derelict condition by the smack Queen of the Fleet (United Kingdom).
Magata	Norway	The ship was wrecked on the Rattray Briggs, off the coast of Aberdeenshire with the loss of her captain. Three survivors were rescued. She was on a voyage from Langesund to Wick, Caithness, United Kingdom.
Margaret West	United Kingdom	The schooner was driven ashore at Folkestone, Kent. She was later refloated and taken in to Dover, Kent with the assistance of a tug.
Marie	Germany	The brig was abandoned in the Atlantic Ocean before 28 March. She was on a voyage from Galveston, Texas, United States to Queenstown, County Cork, United Kingdom.
Monjuich	Spain	The schooner collided with the steamship Tropigne (France) and sank at Montevideo with the loss of a crew member.
Niord	Norway	The schooner was wrecked at "Tarbetners", Ross-shire, United Kingdom with the loss of a crew member.
Novo Feliz	Portugal	The schooner struck a floating object and foundered. Her crew were rescued. She was on a voyage from Málaga, Spain to Gibraltar.
Protègé de Marie	France	The lugger was wrecked in the Îles de Glénan, Finistère. She was on a voyage from Cardiff, Glamorgan, United Kingdom to Nantes, Loire-Inférieure.
Redcoat	New South Wales	The schooner was driven ashore and wrecked in the Fiji Islands before 27 March.
Rosa	Norway	The barque was abandoned at sea by all but her captain and a sailor. The sailor was rescued by the fishing smack No. 626 (France but her captain was crushed between the two vessels. Rosa was subsequently towed in to Boulogne, Pas-de-Calais, France.
Ruth	United Kingdom	The full-rigged ship was driven ashore and wrecked at Cap Gris-Nez, Pas-de-Calais. Her crew were rescued. She was on a voyage from London to Dunkirk, Nord, France.
Sigrid	United States	The ship was driven ashore at Philadelphia, Pennsylvania. She was on a voyage from Matanzas, Cuba to Philadelphia.
Stjernen	Norway	The ship was wrecked at Cap-Haïtien, Haiti. Her crew were rescued.
Unicorn	United Kingdom	The schooner was driven ashore on Coney Island, County Sligo. She was on a voyage from Sligo to Garston, Lancashire.
Wave Queen	United Kingdom	The fishing smack was driven ashore at Fleet Haven, Lincolnshire.
Wolverton	United Kingdom	The ship was driven ashore and wrecked at Chincoteague, Virginia, United States. Her crew were rescued. She was on a voyage from Cárdenas, Cuba to New York.
HMS Wye	Royal Navy	The store ship ran aground in the Gulf of Suez. She was refloated.
Wykeham	United Kingdom	The ship steamship foundered in the Atlantic Ocean after 15 March with the loss of all 22 people on board, possibly having collided with another vessel. She was on a voyage from Cardiff to Port Said, Egypt. Wreckage from the ship washed up on the coast of Portugal.
Two unnamed vessels	United Kingdom	The brigs were driven ashore at Spurn Point, Yorkshire, with the loss of one life.
Unnamed	United Kingdom	The ketch struck rocks and foundered off Start Point, Devon. Her crew survived.
