= Pacific Pearl =

Pacific Pearl may refer to:

- Pacific Pearl Airways, an airline established in 2006 and operating in the Philippines
- Pacific Pearl Company, a United States pearling company established in 1863 and dissolved in 1924
- MV Pacific Pearl, a cruise ship launched in 1988 and operated by P&O Cruises Australia, sold to Cruise & Maritime Voyages in 2017 and renamed MV Columbus, and subsequently scrapped in 2021 during the COVID-19 pandemic.
