= SS Yankee Blade =

Three-masted side-wheel steamship

History

United States
- Name: Yankee Blade
- Builder: Perrine, Patterson & Stack
- Launched: November 11, 1853
- Fate: Wrecked October 1, 1854

General characteristics
- Class & type: steamship
- Tonnage: 1767-tons TM
- Length: 274 ft 4 in (83.62 m)
- Beam: 39 ft 0 in (11.89 m)
- Depth: 22 ft 0 in (6.71 m)
- Propulsion: 75 inch cylinder, 11 feet stroke engine by Allaire Iron Works

Yankee Blade was a three-masted sidewheel paddle steamer belonging to the Independent Line (a holding of Cornelius Vanderbilt). Yankee Blade was one of the first steamships built to transport gold, passengers, and cargo between Panama and San Francisco, California, during the California Gold Rush. The ship was wrecked in fog off Point Arguello in Southern California on October 1, 1854. The shipwreck cost an estimated 30 to 40 lives.

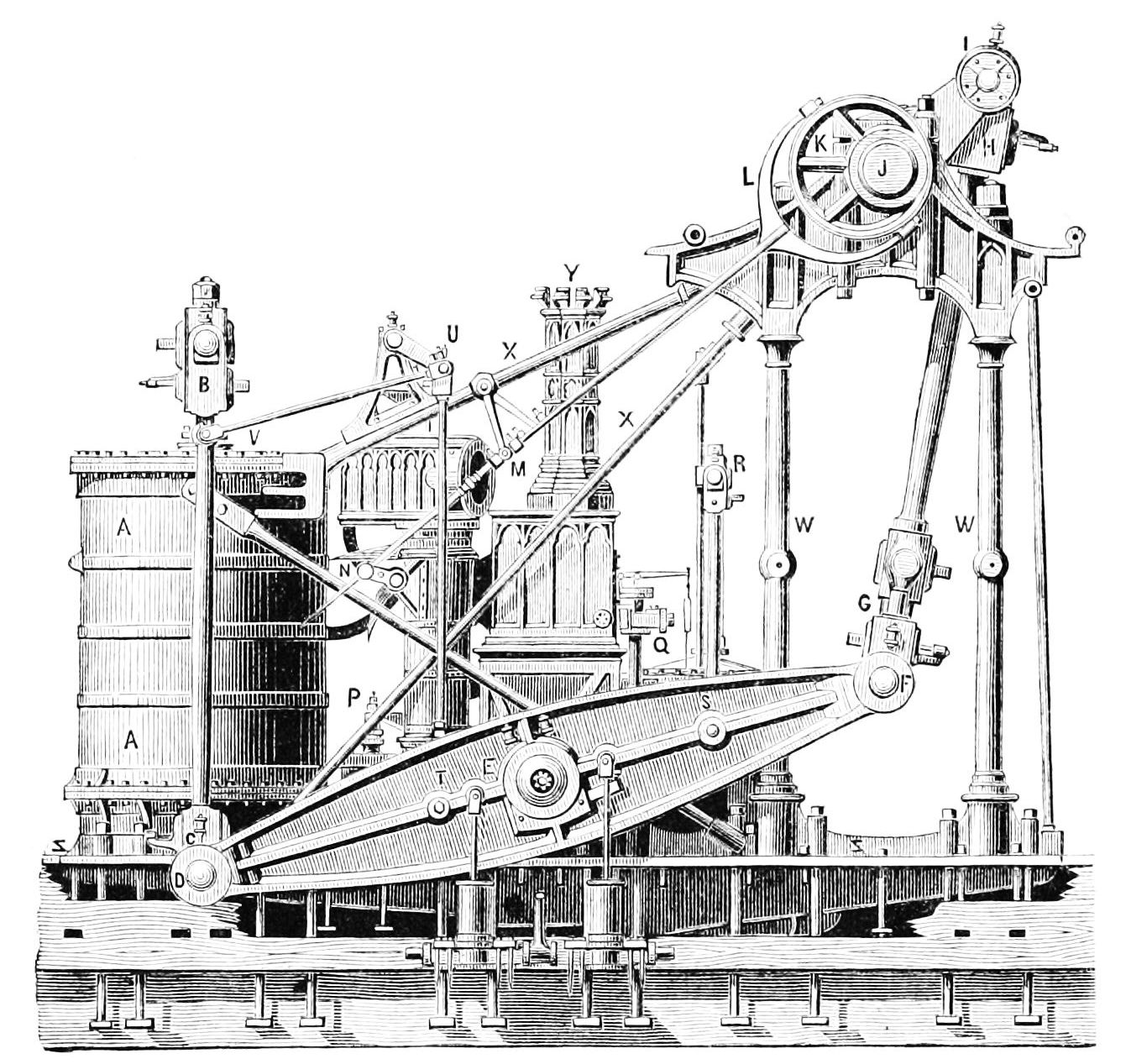
A side-lever engine powered Yankee Blade.

== Transit routes during the California Gold Rush ==
As soon as the discovery of gold at Sutter's Mill became known in 1848, many people wished to travel to California to mine for gold. At that time, there were three main routes for people from the eastern United States to travel to California. The first route was via overland travel, which was expensive, dangerous, and took a long time. Another route involved sailing approximately fourteen thousand miles (12,000 nmi; 23,000 km) around Cape Horn in South America. Though this way was faster and sometimes less expensive, the route was no less dangerous, as the weather in the Southern Ocean was often harsh and unforgiving. In addition to the dangers present on both routes, the journey by land could very often take over six months, and the sea route, though faster, could still take over three months to complete.

The third and fastest route involved traveling via steamship to Panama, hiking through the jungle on the Isthmus of Panama, and then traveling by sea again from the coast of Panama to San Francisco. Though this route cut the time of the sea journey down to less than six weeks, the lack of ships operating between Panama and San Francisco could often lead to significant waiting times for passengers in Panama. It was to fill this untapped market of transportation between Panama and California that the Yankee Blade was built.

== Construction and design ==
SS Yankee Blade was built by Perrine, Patterson & Stack in 1853 and launched on November 11, 1853. Her engine was constructed by Allaire Iron Works. She was one of the first steamships built to carry gold, passengers, and cargo on the second leg of the journey between New York City and San Francisco via the Isthmus of Panama. She was built as one of the most luxurious ships in the Independent Line fleet, with larger, square portholes, bathrooms, and a ship's surgeon whose services were free for the passengers. The ship was built as one of the fastest of the time, her side-lever steam engine, a more powerful but less efficient design than the less compact walking beam-type engines, propelled the ship to a cruising speed of around thirteen knots (24 km/h; 15 mph).

Yankee Blade was commanded by Captain Henry Randall, who had worked for a competitor of the Independent Line, the Pacific Mail Steamship Company, until his retirement two years before in 1852. Randall was in command of Yankee Blade for her entire life.

== Last voyage ==
Yankee Blade left San Francisco for Panama on what would be her final voyage on September 30, 1854. The ship held an estimated US$153,000 worth of gold as well as additional valuables passengers had entrusted to the ship's purser. The official ship's manifest stated that there were 819 passengers aboard, although due to tickets purchased at the last minute and the presence of stowaways, the true number of people on-board was much higher, with estimates of up to 1,200 people.

Also leaving San Francisco for Panama was the steamship Sonora, with whom it is probable the captain of the Yankee Blade was engaged in an unofficial race. On the previous day, the Daily Alta California had an advertisement alleging a $5,000 bet that Yankee Blade would beat Sonora to Panama. Once both ships left the confines of the San Francisco Bay, Sonora headed out to sea to take the longer but safer route well offshore, away from any dangerous navigational hazards. Meanwhile, Yankee Blade set off on a route which hugged the California coast, a route that was far more dangerous due to the high risk of striking various hazards along the coast.

As Yankee Blade steamed down the coast, she passed the coastal steamer Southerner, which was headed for San Francisco. Concerned with the apparently reckless course taken by Yankee Blade, the captain of Southerner hailed Captain Haley of the steam tug Goliah, requesting that Goliah watch for Yankee Blade in case Yankee Blade ran aground and required assistance. Goliah began following Yankee Blade′s path, but soon encountered thick fog banks and reduced speed for safety.

Yankee Blade also soon encountered thick fog, but unlike Captain Haley, Captain Randall did not order a change in speed or course. About 12:00 p.m. on Sunday, October 1, 1854, Yankee Blade struck a rock pinnacle approximately 1 nautical mile (1.9 km; 1.2 mi) offshore. The resulting collision tore a 12-foot (3.7 m) gash in the ship's hull beneath the waterline near the stern. Firmly wedged on the rock, the forward part of the ship was driven almost 60 feet (18 m) from the water by the force of the collision. However, the stern of the ship was underwater and under constant pounding from the surf, causing a fear among the ship's officers that the ship could break in two.

Soon the ship's lifeboats were lowered with the task of ferrying the passengers to shore. In a move that was later found to be very controversial, Captain Randall himself took command of one of the lifeboats, leaving his unqualified teenage son in charge of the ship. Though Captain Randall would later claim to have been seeking a safe landing for the passengers, conflicting claims create confusion as to whether Captain Randall returned to the wreck. It is known that he spent the night on shore while most passengers were still aboard the wreck.

== Rescue ==
The next day, Goliah still was progressing slowly along the coast when she came upon the forward section of Yankee Blade, still filled with the great majority of the ship's passengers. At great danger to his own ship, Captain Haley positioned Goliah as close as possible to the remains of Yankee Blade. A line was set up between the two ships, and a lifeboat from Goliah soon was ferrying the survivors from the wreck, a process which took the majority of the day. Soon after the last survivor was removed, the remains of the bow of Yankee Blade slipped from the rock and sank. Due to the lack of space on board, Goliah was forced to leave around 300 survivors ashore, where they joined the others. Goliah then dropped off its passengers in Santa Barbara, San Pedro, and San Diego, California. She ran aground off San Diego, delaying her, and it was two days before she returned to retrieve the rest of the survivors and return them to San Francisco.
