= Sub Marine Explorer =

Early submarine craft

Coordinates: 8.28158°N 78.8459°W

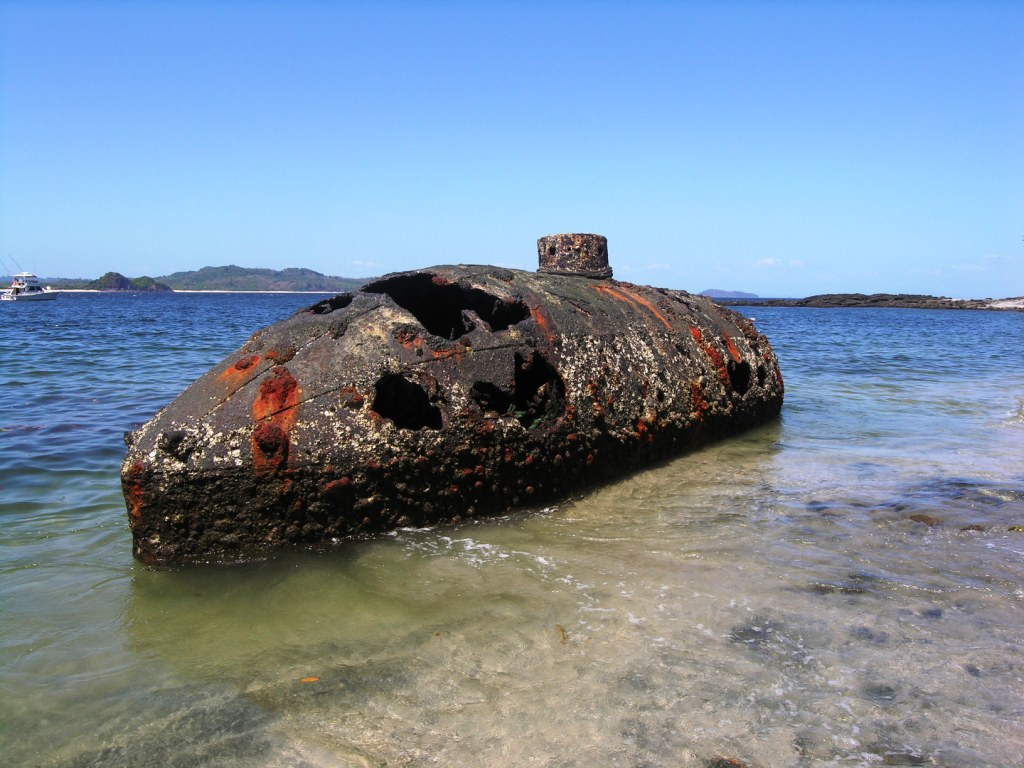
- Hull of the Sub Marine Explorer on the shore of Panama's Pearl Islands

History
- Name: Sub Marine Explorer
- Builder: Julius H. Kroehl and Ariel Patterson
- Laid down: 1863
- Launched: 1865
- Acquired: 1865
- In service: 1866
- Out of service: 1869
- Fate: Abandoned

General characteristics
- Displacement: 80 tons
- Length: 12.0 m (39.4 ft)
- Beam: 3.3 m (11 ft)
- Propulsion: single propeller
- Speed: 4 knots (7.4 km/h; 4.6 mph)
- Complement: 3 to 6

Sub Marine Explorer is a submersible built between 1863 and 1866 by Julius H. Kroehl and Ariel Patterson in Brooklyn, New York for the Pacific Pearl Company. It was hand powered and had an interconnected system of a high-pressure air chamber or compartment, a pressurized working chamber for the crew, and water ballast tanks. Problems with decompression sickness and overfishing of the pearl beds led to the abandonment of Sub Marine Explorer in Panama in 1869 despite publicized plans to shift the craft to the pearl beds of Baja California.

== Construction ==
Sub Marine Explorer had an external high air pressure chamber which was filled with compressed air at a pressure of up to 200 pounds per square inch (1,400 kPa) by a steam pump mounted on an external support vessel. Water ballast tanks were flooded to make the vessel submerge. Pressurized air was then released into the vessel to build up enough pressure so it would be possible to open two hatches on the underside, while keeping water out. This meant that air pressure inside the submarine had to equal water pressure at diving depth, exposing the crew to high pressure, making them susceptible to decompression sickness, which was unknown at the time. To surface, more of the pressurized air was used to empty the ballast tanks of water. A contemporary (August 1869) newspaper account of dives in Sub Marine Explorer off Panama documents 11 days of diving to 103 feet (31 m), spending four hours per dive, and ascending with a quick release of the pressure to ambient (sea level) pressure. Modern reconstruction of Explorer's systems suggests an ascension rate of 1 foot per second (0.30 m/s), or a rise to the surface in just under two minutes. The problems of decompression do not appear to have been clearly understood; the contemporary reference notes that at the conclusion of the dives, "all the men were again down with fever; and, it being impossible to continue working with the same men for some time, it was decided, the experiment having proved a complete success, to lay the machine up in an adjacent cove...."(The New York Times, August 29, 1869).

The basic premise of Sub Marine Explorer was based on an earlier 1858 patent by Van Buren Ryerson of New York for a diving bell also named "Sub Marine Explorer." Ryerson and Kroehl had worked together, Kroehl using Ryerson's bell to blast and partially clear Diamond Reef in New York harbor. Kroehl, working with Brooklyn shipbuilder Ariel Patterson, extensively modified Ryerson's design, extending the hull form to a 12 m-long (39 ft), 3.3 m-diameter (11 ft) craft of intricate design. While some have termed Kroehl's Sub Marine Explorer a "glorified diving bell," its sophisticated systems of ballast, pressurization and propulsion make it a nineteenth-century antecedent to more modern "lock out" dive systems and subs.

== History ==
After construction, the Sub Marine Explorer was partially disassembled and transported to Panama in December 1866, where she was reassembled to harvest oysters and pearls in the Pearl Islands. Experimental dives with the Sub Marine Explorer in the Bay of Panama ended in September 1867 when Kroehl died of "fever". The craft languished on the beach until 1869, when a new engineer and crew took it to the Pearl Islands to harvest oyster shells and pearls. The 1869 dives, with known depths and dive profiles that would have inevitably led to decompression sickness, resulted in the entire crew succumbing to what was described as "fever". Because of this, the craft was laid up in a cove on the shores of the island of San Telmo in the Pearl Islands.

The submarine's rusting hull was well known to locals, but they had presumed it to be a remnant of World War II. In 2001, after many years of misidentification, the remains of the Sub Marine Explorer piqued the interest of archaeologist James P. Delgado of the Institute of Nautical Archaeology. Identification of the craft, with the assistance of submarine historians Richard Wills and Eugene Canfield, led to four archaeological expeditions to the Explorer in 2002, 2004, 2006, and 2008. Documentation of the Sub Marine Explorer has resulted in detailed plans, including interpretive reconstructions of the craft, scientific study of its environment and interaction with the surrounding water, bathymetric assessment, scientific analysis of rates of corrosion, and considerable historical research. Work in 2006 was funded by the National Oceanic and Atmospheric Administration through the Office of Ocean Exploration. The 2008 expedition was funded by the Waitt Institute for Discovery of La Jolla. The vessel is now included in the Historic American Engineering Record of the U.S. National Park Service. A report from 2007 summarizes preservation options for the submarine for the Panamanian government and recommends the recovery, preservation and public display of the craft in Panama. Metal analysis confirms that the craft is in a critical stage and faces irreversible deterioration and loss.

The Sub Marine Explorer is the subject of two documentary films; the first was an episode of the "Sea Hunters" that aired on National Geographic International Television in 2004, and the second, by Der Spiegel, which aired in Europe and in the US on the Smithsonian channel in 2010.

== See also ==
- H. L. Hunley (submarine)
- Alligator (submarine)
