= Ariel Patterson =

Dennison J. Lawlor, Shipbuilder, Chelsea, Massachusetts

Ariel Patterson shipbuilder
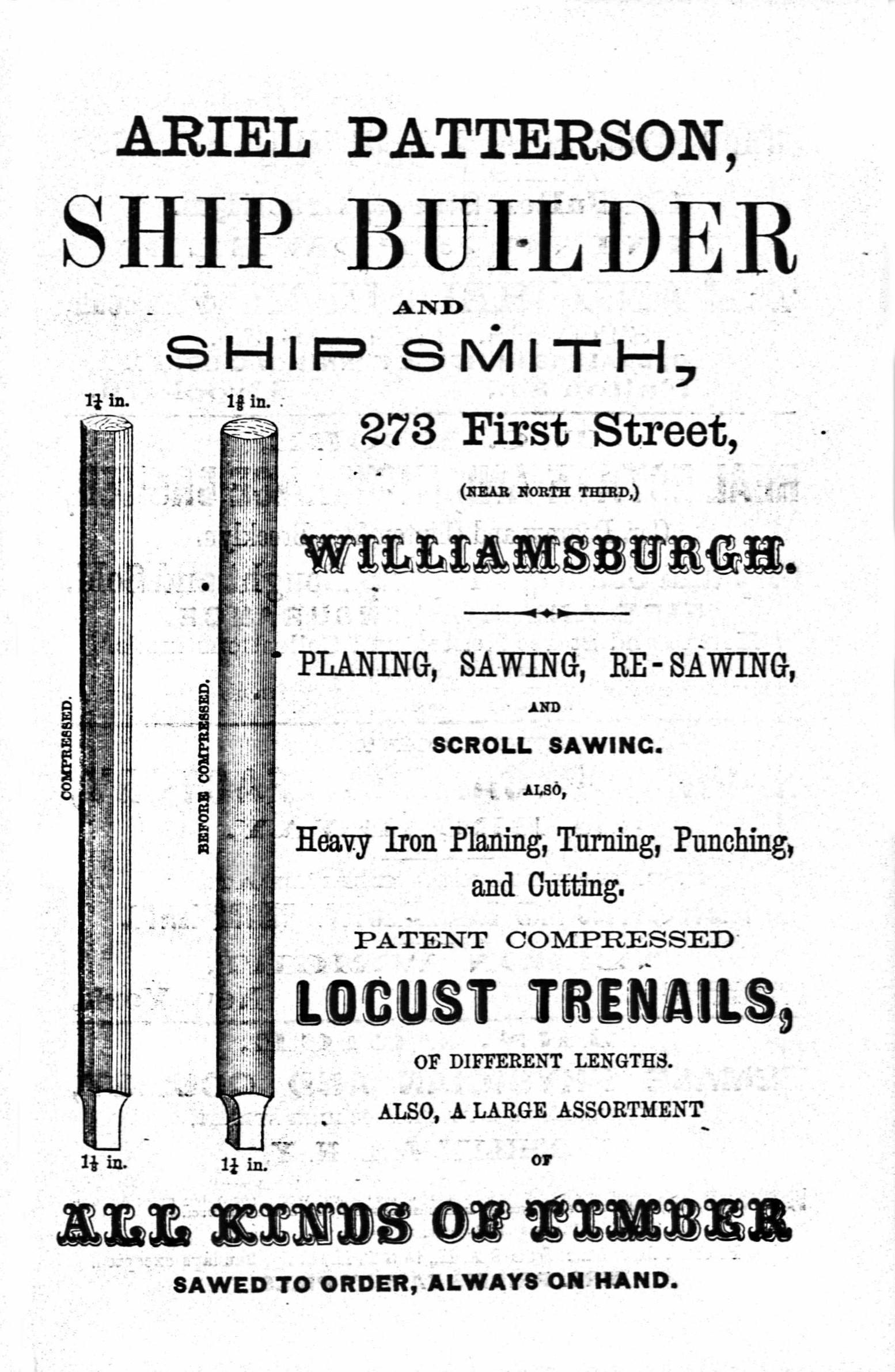
- Ariel Patterson shipbuilding advertisement, 1865.
- Born: September 1, 1807; Brockville, Canada
- Died: April 23, 1877 (aged 69); Chelsea, Massachusetts, US
- Occupation: shipbuilder
- Years active: 1825–1867
- Spouse: Helen Ayres
- Children: 9

Ariel Patterson, (September 1807 – 23 April 1877) was a 19th-century American shipbuilder. He apprenticed under shipbuilder Perrine, Patterson, and Stack in Williamsburg, Brooklyn. Patterson had his own shipyard, building and designing for 40 years some of the finest steamships. The most notable were the steamer Ericsson, which had the first Hot air engine invented by John Ericsson and the three-masted side-wheel SS Yankee Blade, one of the first steamships to trade between to New York and San Francisco. In 1863, Patterson bought property at the foot of North Third Street, where he started a shipbuilding, dockage and a sawing and planing mill. He died in Brooklyn, New York in 1877.

== Early life ==
Ariel Patterson was born at Brockville, Canada in September 1807.

== Career ==
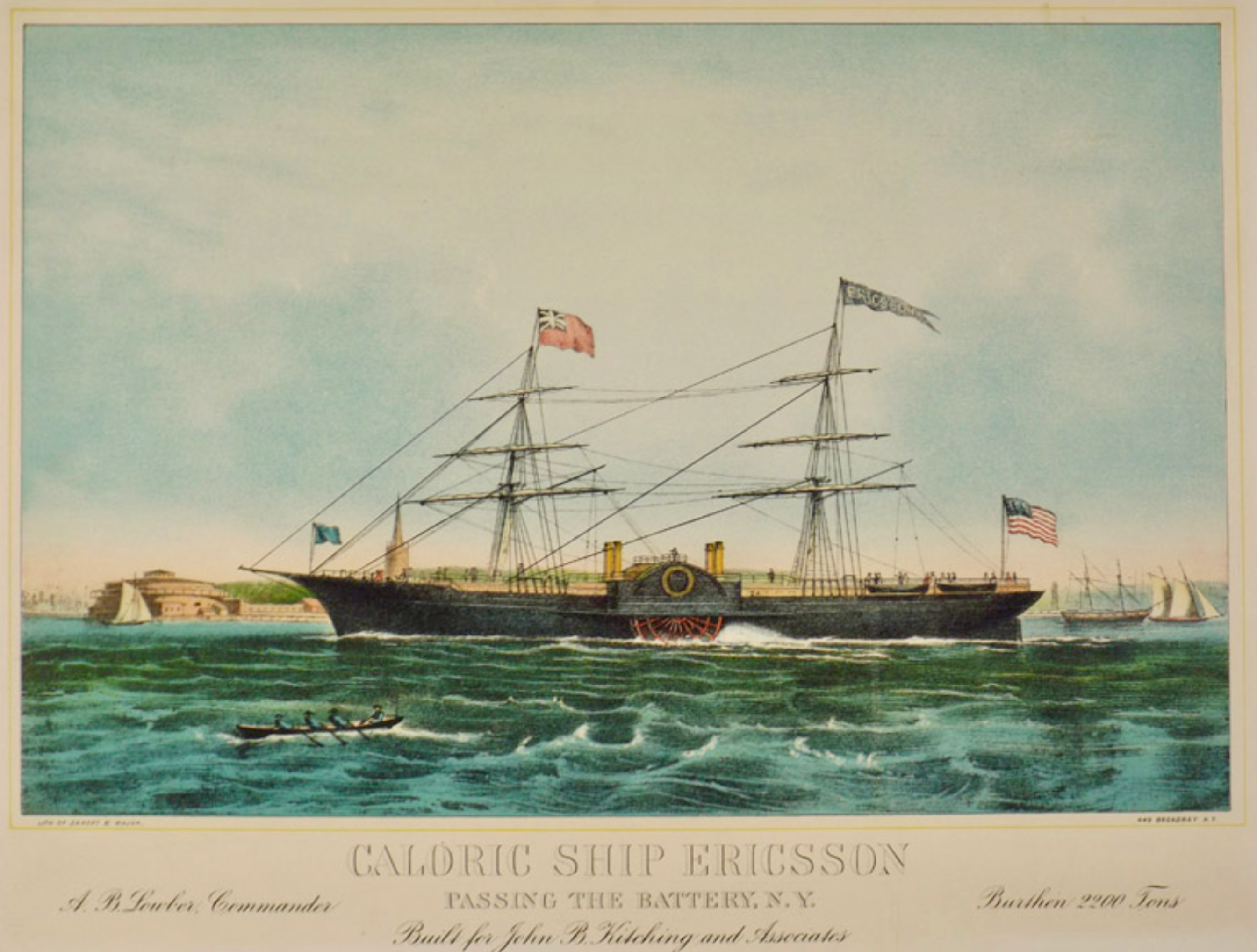
Steamship Ericsson (1852).

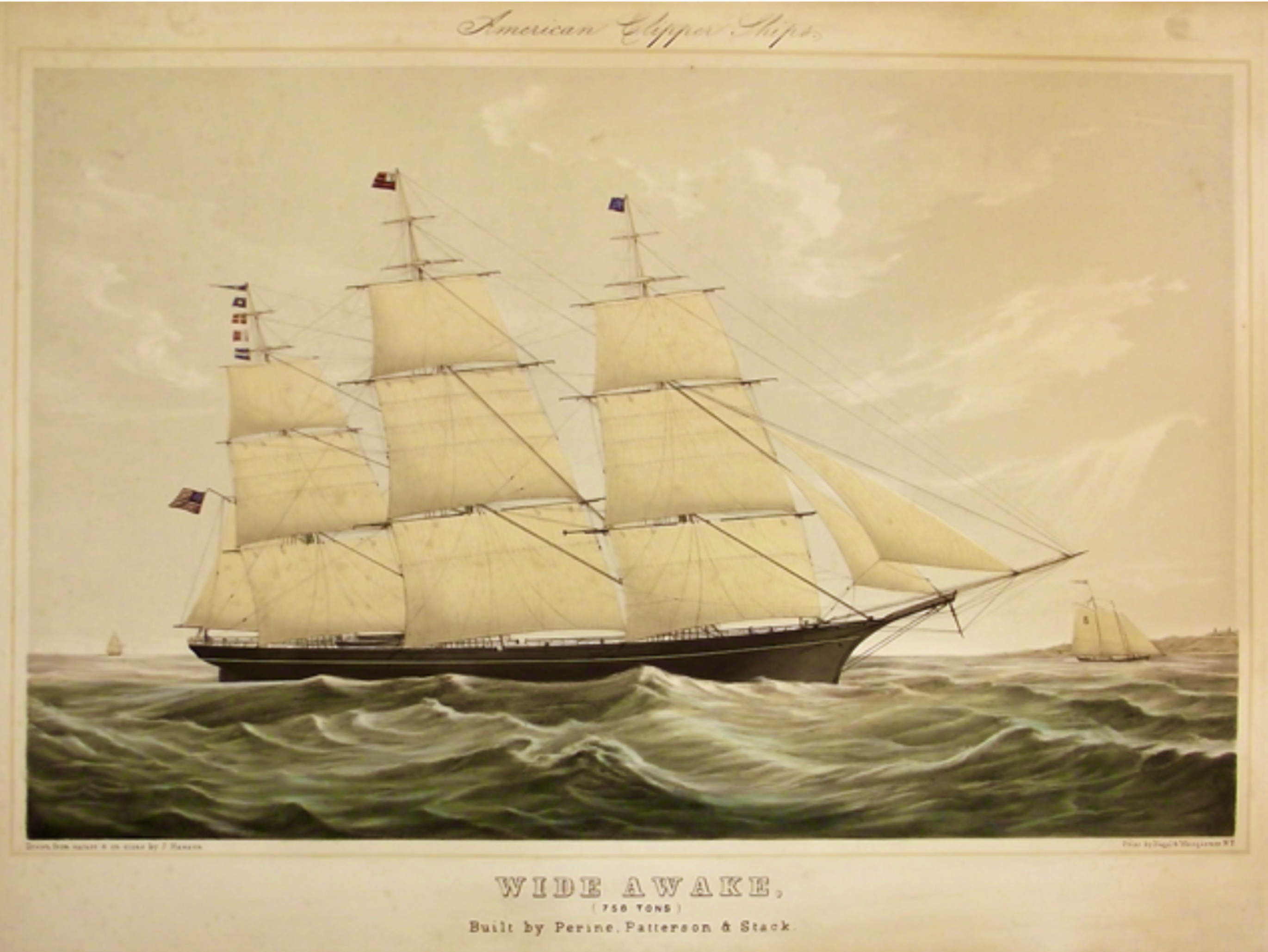
Clipper ship Wide Awake (1853).

Ariel Patterson was a well-known resident of Brooklyn, New York who had a good reputation for his work as a shipbuilder. He became a member of the firm Perrine, Patterson, and Stack in Williamsburg, Brooklyn, at the foot of North Second and North Sixth Streets. There he constructed the celebrated steamer Ericsson, which had the first hot air engine invented by John Ericsson in 1852. He also built the three-masted side-wheel SS Yankee Blade, one of the first steamships to trade between to New York and San Francisco. When the firm went out of business in 1853, Patterson continued in shipbuilding at the foot of North Eighth Street, next to the shipyard of Perrine & Stack. The shipyard launched in 1853 the sloop Margaret Ann Lake (80-tons); brig Flying Cloud (400-tons); schooner Fidelia (90-tons); ship Wide Awake (900-tons); schooner Heloise (450-tons); brig Bonito (400-tons); and the bark Velocity (350-tons).

On March 27, 1854, Patterson along with 36 other shipbuilders, signed a document that was published in the New York Daily Herald. The document was the result of a meeting that was held at the office of William H. Webb between the shipbuilders of the port of New York. They resolved that they have a high respect for labor; that they do not support an increase of wages from $2.50 to $3.00 per day; and that they should not strike for the higher wages.

On June 29, 1854, Patterson launched the ship Francis B. Cutting. She was 1,000-tons and owned by E. D. Hurlbut & Co., for the Antwerp trade. In May he launched the three-decked ship Jeremiah Thompson. She was 1,818-tons for S. Thompson & Nephew's line of packets. At this time he was still building the ship City of New York of 1,818-tons for Kingsland & Sutton; and a schooner of 250-tons for Minor H. Keath.

On July 10, 1863, Patterson purchased the half blocks at the foot of North 3rd Street, Brooklyn, New York for shipbuilding and dockage. He was associated with Commodore Vanderbilt, George Law, A. A. Low and other large shipowners with the intention of erecting the largest sectional dock in the county. On May 11, 1864, Patterson planned to expand the dock, made of iron, 400 feet where the water is 50 feet deep to accommodate large vessels. Patterson also created a sawing and planing mill for shipbuilding at the North 3rd Street location.

During the American Civil War, Patterson undertook shipbuilding for the US Government at his shipyard. He did all of the woodwork in the USS Dictator in 1863. A new pilot-boat Ariel Patterson, No. 12, was launched on November 23, 1864 at the Ariel Patterson shipyard and named in his honor.

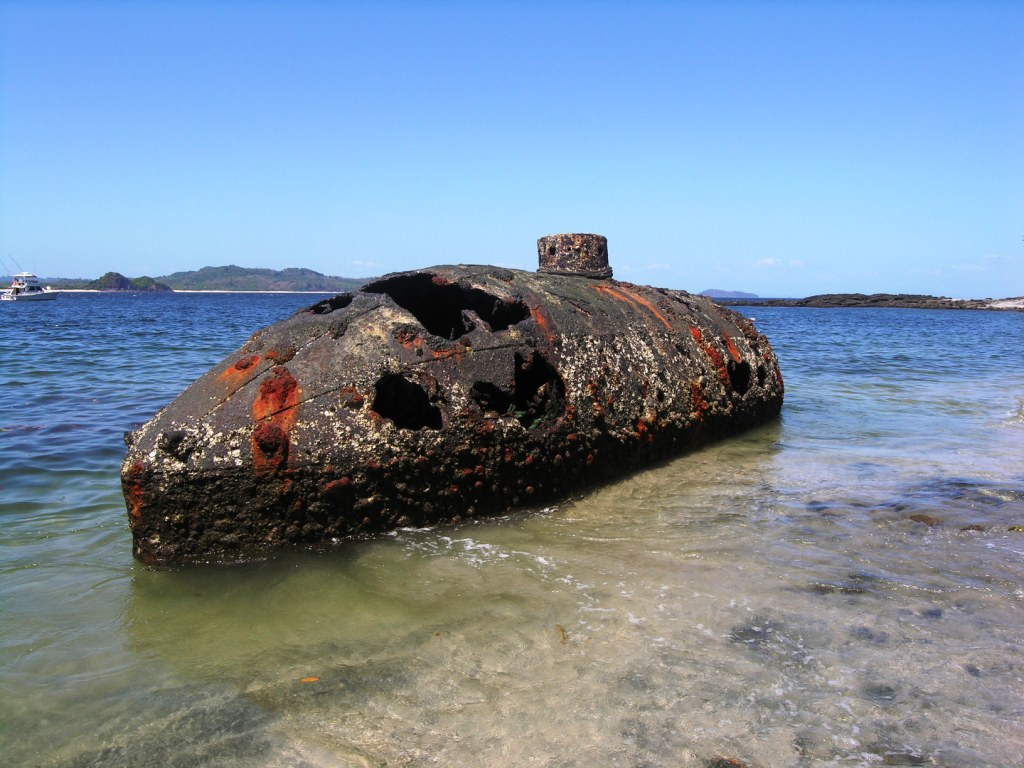
Sub Marine Explorer Wreck

In 1865, Patterson worked with Julius H. Kroehl to produce the Sub Marine Explorer submarine based on a modified design of a 1858 patent by Van Buren Ryerson. They extended the hull form to a 12 m-long (39 ft), 3.3 m-diameter (11 ft) craft. Kroehl used the submarine to blast and partially clear Diamond Reef in New York harbor.

Patterson retired from the trade in 1867 after the postwar shipbuilding decline.

== Death ==
Patterson died on April 23, 1877. His funeral took place at his son's residence in Brooklyn. Reverend W. H. Johnson officiated. He was buried at the Evergreens Cemetery in Brooklyn. At his death he left three daughters and four sons. His wife died in July 1863.

== See also ==
- List of Northeastern U. S. Pilot Boats
- List of sailboat designers and manufacturers
