= Pacific Pearl Company =

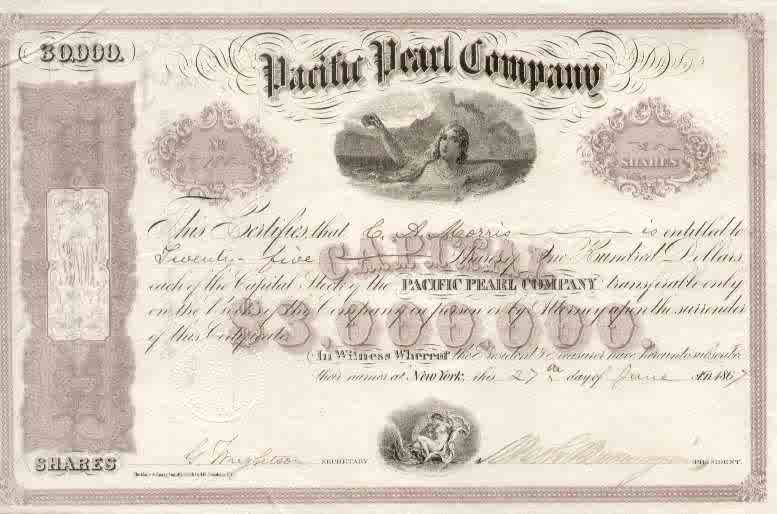
Stock certificate for the Pacific Pearl Company

The Pacific Pearl Company was incorporated in the American state of New York on November 18, 1863. Principal officers included John Chadwick as president, George Wrightson as treasurer, and Julius H. Kroehl as chief engineer. Other shareholders included William Henry Tiffany, Charles D. Poston and William M. B. Hartley. The company was a venture to harvest pearls and pearl shells in the Pacific Ocean. The first site chosen was Panama, in particular the Pearl Islands. After Kroehl recovered sufficiently from malaria he contracted while serving the Union Navy during the Vicksburg Campaign, he began designing and building a vessel at Ariel Patterson's Shipyard near the Brooklyn Navy Yard. Also being built nearby was the Intelligent Whale under the direction of Scovel S. Merriam. There were many companies active in submarine salvage at this time.

The vessel Kroehl built was later known as Sub Marine Explorer. It operated as a diving bell, but was autonomous as a submarine propeller. It held its fourth test dive on May 31, 1866, receiving notice in many newspapers.

In August 1866, the company held a meeting to raise funds by selling stock. At this time, Mark Brumagim became president of the company. But the submarine was not dispatched to Panama until December 1866. Whether this was due to insufficient funds, the political situation in Panama, or technical problems with the vessel is unknown at this time.

After arriving at Aspinwall, the vessel was transported via railroad to the city of Panama. It was reassembled, tested, and then shipped to the island of St. Elmo (San Telmo). During a test run around the island, the submarine while skimming the bottom at 30 feet, went over a submarine cliff going down to 75 feet. However, the relative lightness was no problem, and the crew managed to make it back to the surface unscathed.

Harvesting continued through the summer, resulting in thousands of pounds of pearl shells and many pearls. As the crew was staying in Panama to return the season's harvest, Kroehl had a fatal recurrence of malaria. He died on 9 September 1867. With no funds to continue harvesting, and without Kroehl's leadership, the crew returned to the New York.

The Company continued to retell the story of the success of the harvest in 1868, and later in 1870. But one newspaper account in 1868 noted that the submarine lay derelict for a year and that Kroehl was dead.

"What has become of the Pacific Pearl Company? Their little submarine boat, which cost one way or another nearly one hundred thousand dollars, has been lying neglected on the sand beach at one of the islands in the Bay of Panama for almost a year past. When its unfortunate builder, Mr. Kroehl, was alive there was a fair prospect of its being a success if funds had been supplied to him to work it, but now it looks as if the boat were entirely abandoned, or if it is not it will very soon, if not already, prove entirely useless."

— Philadelphia Inquirer, p. 2, August 24, 1868

In 1869, the company resumed its work, with Henry A. Dingee in charge of the operation. In August of that year, the company reported a harvest of pearls and pearl shells. But many workers became ill and died while working the submarine, probably from the effects of decompression sickness.

There was interest to harvest pearls in Baja California using the Sub Marine Explorer, and that the "Engineer" was scouting a position. However, the company recorded no further accomplishments. In 1924, the company was quietly dissolved by the New York registrar of companies.

There are two other companies that operated at different times with the same name, but have no relation with this company. One was a British company which was active around the 1820s and undertook a commercial expedition to New South Wales, Australia. The other was a Japanese company active during the second half of the 20th century.

== Sources ==
- Delgado, James P. (2012). Misadventures of a Civil War Submarine: Iron, Guns, and Pearls. Texas A&M University Press. ISBN 978-1603444729.
