= Goliah (1849 tugboat) =

American Tugboat

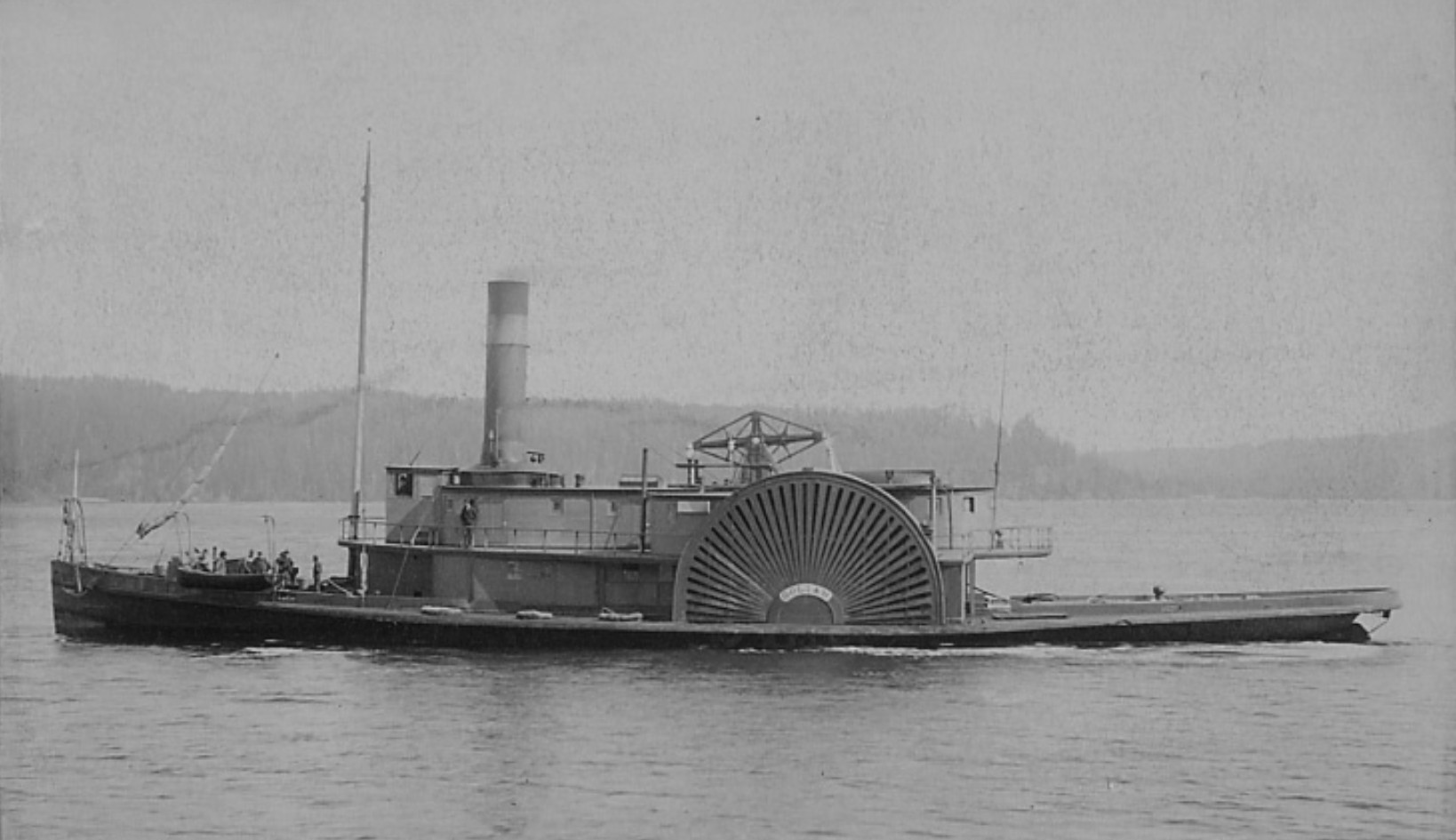
- Goliah in California service as a towboat

History
- Name: Goliah
- Route: Puget Sound
- In service: 1849
- Out of service: 1894
- Fate: Scrapped 1899, hull burned for metal

General characteristics
- Tonnage: 235.86-gross tons
- Length: 154 ft (46.9 m) over hull, 51 ft (16 m)
- Beam: 30 ft (9.1 m) over hull, 51 ft (16 m)
- Depth: 9.75 ft (3.0 m) depth of hold
- Installed power: 1 × 250 hp vertical beam; 50 in bore by 8 ft stroke
- Propulsion: sidewheels
- Speed: 13 kn (24 km/h) maximum

Goliah was a large sidewheel tugboat built in New York in 1849, and only the second purpose-built tug ever built in the United States, previous tugs having been converted from old passenger-freight steamboats. The long service life of this vessel caused it to become known as the "everlasting" Goliah.

Shortly after completion Goliah was sold to California parties, and made the long trip around Cape Horn to California, where the vessel would spend the remainder of its career. After arrival, the tug alternated between service as a towboat and passenger-freight service. At one point, it was rebuilt as a passenger-freight steamer and ran on the Sacramento River under the name Defender.

The tug was eventually shortened and reconverted for use as a towboat under its original name. Goliah would serve at various points along the California coast for the remainder of its career. The vessel was broken up in 1898.

== Construction ==
Goliah was built in New York City. William H. Webb built the wooden hull and T.F. Secor built the engine. The original purpose for Goliah was to tow sailing vessels in and out of New York Harbor. Previous steamers, which had not been purpose-built for the task, had been underpowered and many ships had been lost as a result.

== Transfer to California ==
On completion Webb sold the vessel to parties who intended to enter it into the Sacramento River trade, then booming because of the California Gold Rush. The new owners ran into financial difficulties, and the Goliah was seized by marshals acting on behalf of their creditors. Regardless of this, on April 1, 1850, Goliah's owners took the vessel out of the harbor, quite illegally, and without any coal. They then set out for California, which in that time required a voyage around Cape Horn, at the southern tip of South America.

Goliah managed to reach St. Thomas (then not U.S. Territory, but rather part of the Danish West Indies, where fuel and provisions were secured. Goliah arrived in San Francisco, after 279 days, on January 21, 1851, carrying 13 passengers from Panama City. Within days of its arrival, Charles Minturn, sent Goliah with passengers to the Gold Bluffs, on the northwest coast of California. Meanwhile, four days later, Minturn advertised a quarter share of ownership in the Goliah, for sale. Shortly after its return from the Gold Bluffs on February, Goliah was advertised for service doing what it was designed to do, towing ships from the sea to any point on San Francisco Bay. On March 3, Goliah carried a whaling expedition to the Farallon Islands. It also made occasional runs back and forth to Sacramento, From April 2 it began making runs to Oregon by way of Trinidad, and it became a direct run from April 21. From May 17, 1851, the Goliah was put in regular service as a passenger/freight steamer down the coast of California to San Diego, stopping at intermediate ports of Monterey, San Luis Obispo, Santa Barbara and San Pedro. The Daily Alta California of July 14, 1851 reported it made the trip in 6 days and eighteen hours. Goliah was withdrawn from this coastal run at the end of September 1851.

The vessel was lengthened and ran as a passenger boat on the Sacramento under the name of Defender. During this time, Goliah was engaged in fierce competition with the New World, another steamer brought around from the East Coast in defiance of creditors. At one point, this competition produced gunfire between the passengers and crews of the two steamboats when Goliah, or so it is alleged, attempted to ram and sink the New World.

Goliah was soon bought off by the California Steam Navigation Company, which was building a monopoly on Sacramento river shipping, and as a result was then placed on the ocean routes. Capt. George Flavel (1823–1893) ran the vessel. up north. Goliah later made runs along the coast of California under the command of Capt. Robert Haley. In the spring of 1854, Goliah rescued the passengers of the steamship Yankee Blade which had wrecked off Point Concepcion.

Goliah was subsequently shortened, and ran for many years as a towboat in San Francisco harbor, finally passing into the hands of the Wrights, a family of ship and riverboat captains. The Wrights again lengthened Goliah and placed the vessel on the route from San Francisco to Humboldt County. After a short time in this service she was abandoned and laid over on the Mission Bay mudflats in San Francisco until 1864, when Captain James Griffiths (1840–1887) fixed the steamer up as a towboat once more.

== Puget Sound service ==
Goliah was bought by Pope & Talbot in 1871, and arrived at Port Gamble on 22 March 1871, in charge of Capt. William Hayden, who ran the vessel for a while and was succeeded by Captain Noyes and Capt. J. A. McCoy, who in turn gave way to Capt. S. D. Libby, who remained in command for twelve years.

From the time the vessel arrived on Puget Sound until 1876, when the tug Tacoma appeared, Goliah towed more than half of the vessels that entered the Strait of Juan de Fuca bound for Nanaimo, and nearly all of those bound for the American side.

In 1877 Goliah was extensively repaired, and a new boiler provided, which cost nearly £15,000, its dimensions being, width 14.5 ft (4.4 m), length, 17 ft (5.2 m), diameter, 12 ft (3.7 m). This a "low-pressure" boiler which drove a walking beam steam engine on steam at 18 pound pressure. The engine was a single-cylinder type, 50 inches in diameter with a stroke of 96 inches.

== Later years ==
After Captain Libby left, the vessel was laid up at Port Ludlow for four years. Capt. William Selby then ran the tug for a year and a half, and Ed. Clements took charge of the vessel for a short time. He was succeeded by Capt. William Williamson, who continued in command for six years, until July 27, 1894, when Goliah was again laid up at Port Ludlow. The recently formed Puget Sound Tug Boat Company had deployed a powerful fleet of newer, powerful propeller-driven steam tugs, and Goliah could not compete with them.

In 1895 the Goliah's hull below the water line was said to have been still in excellent condition, and it was further said with mechanical repairs, Goliah might be able to outlast the pioneer steamship Beaver, which had served 53 years until finally wrecked. With the loss of Beaver, Goliah then became the oldest steam vessel afloat on the Pacific Coast.

After being idle from 1894 on, Goliah was deliberately burned at Duwamish Head by the scrapping firm of O.A. Bennett to recover the vessel's metal fittings. The old sidewheel tug S.L. Mastick was burned at the same time with Goliah.
