= Ariel Patterson (pilot boat) =

New York Pilot boat

History

United States
- Name: Ariel Patterson
- Namesake: Ariel Patterson, shipbuilder
- Owner: New York Pilots: Eugene H. Sulivan, John Canvin Sr., John Canvin Jr., and John W. Stanton
- Operator: John W. Stanton, John Canvin Sr., John Canvin Jr., John Campbell
- Builder: Ariel Patterson shipyard
- Cost: $10,000
- Launched: 23 November 1864
- Out of service: 5 March 1883
- Stricken: Commonwealth
- Fate: Sank

General characteristics
- Class & type: schooner
- Tonnage: 84-tons TM
- Length: 71 ft 0 in (21.64 m)
- Beam: 19 ft 0 in (5.79 m)
- Depth: 8 ft 0 in (2.44 m)
- Propulsion: Sail

The Ariel Patterson was a 19th-century Sandy Hook pilot boat built in 1864 for a group of New York Pilots. She was built by the shipbuilder Ariel Patterson. After nineteen years of service, she was struck and sank off Sea Bright, New Jersey by the steamer Commonwealth in 1883. She was raised and purchased by the Coast Wreaking Company.

== Construction and service ==
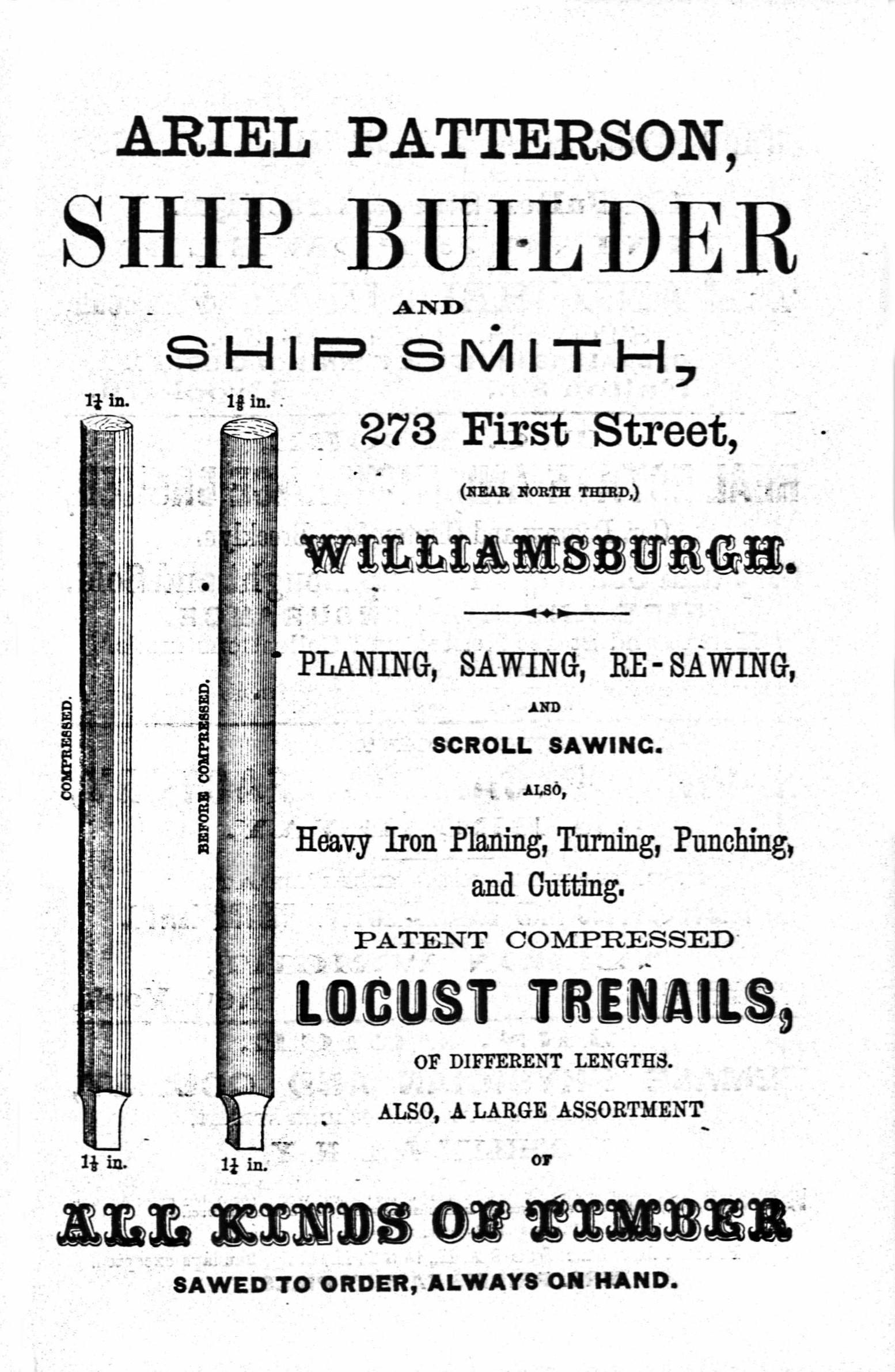
Ariel Patterson shipbuilding advertisement, 1865

The New York pilot-boat Ariel Patterson, No. 12, was built during the American Civil War, when building of new pilot boats became necessary. She was launched on November 23, 1864, by the Ariel Patterson shipyard at the foot of North Third Street, Brooklyn, New York. The Ariel Patterson was named in honor of the shipbuilder Ariel Patterson, founder of the shipyard.

The Ariel Patterson was formerly named the Christianberg. She was the oldest pilot-boat in the service. Sandy Hook pilot Camille Lavand and Captain Jacob Britton, were pilots on the pilot-boat Christianberg.

The Ariel Patterson was registered with Record of American and Foreign Shipping from 1879 to 1885. Her owners were the New York Pilots, belonging to the port of New York. Pilot John W. Stanton was the ship Captain. Her dimensions were 75 ft. in length; 28 ft. breadth of beam; 7 ft. in depth; and 54-tons burthen. The boat number "12" was painted in black on her mainsail to distinguish her from other pilot-boats.

== End of service ==
On 5 March 1883, the pilot-boat Ariel Patterson, No. 12, was run down and sank off Sea Bright, New Jersey, by the steamer Commonwealth. Pilot John Campbell, of Staten Island, went down with the ship. His body, was found off Cape Henlopen. John Canvin Sr., John Canvin Jr. and the rest of the crew were rescued by the Commonwealth and brought to port. The Ariel Patterson had on board pilots, John W. Stanton, John Canvin Sr., John Canvin Jr., and John Campbell; Boatkeeper Alexander Cochran, a cook and four sailors. She was owned by a company of New York pilots, including Eugene H. Sulivan, John Canvin Sr., John Canvin Jr., and John W. Stanton. The boat was worth $10,000 and was insured.

The Ariel Patterson was raised and purchased by the Coast Wrecking Company. She was lifted by the use of tugs and pontoons. The Ariel Patterson was then towed to Gowanus, Brooklyn.

== See also ==
- List of Northeastern U. S. Pilot Boats
