= Julius H. Kroehl =

German American inventor and engineer

Julius Hermann Kroehl
- Born: 1820; Memel in East Prussia (in present-day Lithuania)
- Died: September 9, 1867 (aged 46–47); Panama City, Panama
- Engineering career
- Significant design: Sub Marine Explorer; Mount Morris Fire Watchtower; Flange forming machine; dome for the New York Crystal Palace

Julius Hermann Kroehl (in German, Kröhl) (1820 – September 9, 1867) was a German American inventor and engineer. He invented and built the first submarine able to dive and resurface on its own, the Sub Marine Explorer, technically advanced for its era. His achievements in architecture, civil engineering, and mechanical engineering were also significant.

== Early life ==
Kröhl was born in 1820, in Memel, East Prussia (today Klaipėda, Lithuania). His family moved to Berlin, Kingdom of Prussia around 1828.

On 29 July 1844, he arrived in New York City on board the Fairfield. While residing in New York City, he became an American citizen on October 26, 1849, formally renouncing any loyalty to the King of Prussia and taking on the duties of American citizenship. During his civilian employment with the United States Navy, he was referred to as "captain." Using the honorific title of "captain" was usually indicative of holding an officer's commission in foreign army or having served as an officer in a volunteer militia or fire company. In his letter of introduction to Brigadier General Jacob Lauman, his qualifications were described as having served "in the artillery abroad."

== Family ==
His father was Jacob Kroehl. He was a merchant in Memel. From 1829 to 1833, the family residence was listed as Hausvogteiplatz 11, Berlin, suggesting that the family relocated to the Prussian capital around that time. His mother, Johann Philipine Dorothea, later immigrated to the United States in 1848, but as the wife of a British merchant, John Heanes.

His brother Henry (1819–1890) left to the U.S. in 1838. He had established himself as a merchant, with a business in New York City, and later resided in Asbury Park, New Jersey, after 1870. He was a partner with Otto Dill, until he died in 1861. Henry was married to the former Cornelia Rogers Turfler. Their bodies were buried at Green-Wood Cemetery. Passenger lists and passport records suggest that Henry made a few trips to Germany throughout his life. No other siblings have been identified to this article at this time.

William John Kroehl (1816–1879) resided in England from 1836 through the remainder of his life. UK marriage records show a different father; his citizenship petition showed that he came from Memel, and is likely a cousin. He was naturalised a British citizen on 23 January 1849.

Otto Sackersdorff (1820–1879) also resided in New York City. Julius Kroehl thought highly of him as evidenced by his will in bequeathing many of his papers and reference books. Otto served in the United States Coast Survey around 1854, was active in city politics, and served as an officer of the 5th New York State Militia in 1861 for the protection of the nation's capital during its three-month mobilization. He later served as a surveyor for New York City until the end of his life.

== Marriage ==
Julius married Sophia Rosa Lueber on November 25, 1858, at Holy Trinity Church of Georgetown in Washington, DC. She was born on August 27. 1832, and was a native of Frederick, Maryland. Her father, Francis Lueber (1791–1852), emigrated from Austria, and was a well-to-do merchant; her mother, Hellen Maria Simpson (1809–1890) came from the District of Columbia and was descended from the original English settlers in Maryland. Julius and Sophia had no children. After Julius' death, his widow did not remarry, but continued to live in Georgetown with her widowed mother, sisters, and brother until her death on September 29, 1916, and is buried in Holy Rood Cemetery in Washington, D.C.

Sophia was the niece of the American portrait artist, James Alexander Simpson, and first cousin to another portrait artist, Charles S. Hein, and his brother, Lt. Col. Otto L. Hein. She was also a distant relative of Raphael Semmes and Mary Jenkins Surratt.

Records of the Mount Morris Fire Watchtower also refer to a Nina Kroehl, of unknown relation to Julius.

== Political activity ==
In late 1853, the Koszta Affair had militated many Americans to form societies supporting the U.S. government's interest against the claims of the Austrian Empire. One such committee, the Society of Universal Democratic Republicanism, grew out of a movement to present Capt. Duncan Ingraham, USN, a medal for protecting Kostza in the port of Smyrna, Turkey. Many members were Forty-Eighters as well as native-born nationalists. One of the aims of the society was to monitor political situations around Europe through committees of correspondence, and note any violation of the rights of naturalized American citizens. Kroehl brought to the attention of the society that one Henry von Rensche was arrested by Prussian authorities for crimes against the Crown despite being a naturalized citizen. The Society of Universal Democratic Republicanism included Charles F. Henningsen, Hugh Forbes and Henry H. Morange as members.

== Engineering and New York City ==
Kroehl listed himself as a "submarine engineer" on Broad Street in Lower Manhattan during the 1850s. At this time, the term "submarine" referred to anything underwater, and not exclusively to diving vessels. During this time, he was involved in several engineering and technical projects.

=== Photography ===
An 1851 article in Scientific American magazine describes the Fair of the American Institute. One exhibit was of colored photographs by Messrs. Kroehl & Vetter, of No. 499 Broad Street. This does not necessarily mean this was Julius Kroehl. However, when Kroehl was ordered to support Union forces during the Vicksburg Campaign of 1863, he was directed to bring with him photographic equipment after spending one month being trained on their use by members of the U.S. Coast Survey in Washington, DC. His personal effects enumerated at the time of his death included photographic supplies. His proficiency in photographic uses in 1851 was possible. No works are known to have survived.

=== New York Crystal Palace ===
From 1852 to 1853, Kroehl was employed as an assistant engineer during the construction of the New York Crystal Palace. Several assistant engineers were employed to oversee the construction of certain parts of this exhibition hall. He was responsible for the construction of the dome, the building's central feature. For three years after, he was noted as the "engineer of the Crystal Palace."

=== Flange forming machine ===
Kroehl applied for a patent around March 1854 for a flange forming machine. It is described in Scientific American as

an improvement in machinery for bending flanges on wrought iron beams. There is a pair of horizontal, and a pair of vertical rollers; the former pair has one roller with a face of the full depth of the beam, and the other has its face the depth of the beam minus the thickness of the flanges. The vertical rollers are both alike, and are of a width a little greater than the extreme width of the flanges. They are arranged opposite the space between the horizontal ones, and work in close contact with the sides of the roller. In order to give the flanges and their beams, a taper or an elliptic, or other curved form, the vertical rollers have flanges, whose faces bear on the edges of the flanges of the beam, and cause the said rollers to receive such a movement in the direction of their axes, and apply such a force I that direction as bends the flanges of the beam to the desired form.

Kroehl secured the patent as #12,133 on January 2, 1855.

=== Mount Morris Fire Watchtower ===
The City of New York, in order to improve safety during its growth, laid out a series of fire watch towers. James Bogardus, an innovator of cast iron houses, introduced the first of these towers. One was needed in the Harlem district, which would be situated on an outcropping of rock. On January 14, 1856, the Commissioner of Repairs and Supplies received two bids. Bogardus submitted his usual design at a bid of $5,750, but Kroehl and his partner Peter V. Husted (H&K) won the contract with a lower bid of $2,300; H&K pointed out that the tower need not be as tall, thus saving material and labor. This tower still stands in what is now Marcus Garvey Memorial Park.

Comparing the structure and techniques of this tower with those designed and constructed by Bogardus show many similarities, especially in the method of bolting joints together. In April 1857, Bogardus sued the Mayor, Aldermen and Commonalty of the City of New York, claiming a patent infringement (#7,337). He cited that he was entitled to a royalty payment of $289, plus actual damages of $20,000. The jury agreed that he was entitled to the royalty payment, but not to the damages. Bogardus appealed the ruling to the U.S. Supreme Court, but Supreme Court Chief Justice Roger B. Taney upheld the ruling on appeal.

=== Vanderbilt Rock ===
On 21 May 1853, Cornelius Vanderbilt's yacht, the North Star, ran aground on Corlear's Hook and had to go back to dry dock for repairs, though no material damage was sustained. The area was then called "Vanderbilt Rock" with the expectation that City and State officials would arrange its removal as a hazard to navigation. For over a year, no action was taken. Later, H&K received a contract and they promptly removed the obstruction.

=== Diamond Reef ===
The maritime hazard of Diamond Reef lies at the entrance to the East River between Governor's Island and Lower Manhattan. Benjamin Maillefert was favored to win the contract based on his experience with underwater demolition and salvage. He attempted in 1851 to reduce this underwater obstacle by blasting. This effort was accomplished by lowering a canister of powder onto the rock at flood tide, then backing away a safe distance, detonating it with a galvanic battery. However, this was not yet deemed sufficient, and another bid was undertaken a few years later. Kroehl & Husted was one among five bidders. The Common Council awarded the contract to H&K, but Mayor Fernando Wood vetoed the contract on August 7, 1855, citing that the Council did not have the authority to award contracts, since such authority resides with the Street Commissioner. After appeals and new bidding, H&K was awarded the contract without further dispute, and proceeded to remove the underwater hazard. Blasting operations continued every year, except during the winter months, until 1860.

=== Merlin Rock ===
Peter Cooper, as president of the New York and Newfoundland Telegraph Company, hired H&K to blast Merlin Rock, which lies at the western end of the narrows in St. John's Harbor, in June 1855. They were successful in accomplishing the work by August of that year, to the contracted clearance of 27 feet.

=== Outfitting the Paraguay Expedition of 1858 ===
During the demolition of Diamond Reef, H&K provided underwater explosives to the U.S. Navy for clearing obstructions in the Platte, Parana and Paraguay Rivers, should the ships encounter any. The items were provided to the steamer USS Memphis.

=== Norfolk Navy Yard ===
On 1 July 1859, F.W. Parmenter, a machinist from Troy, New York, contracted with the Navy Department to construct, erect and complete an iron roof for the victualling house at Norfolk Naval Shipyard in the amount of $18,000. Julius H. Kroehl and Sidney D. Roberts served as sureties for the contract. However, monies appropriated for the project were spent elsewhere, so worked dragged through 1861, with work being performed with the assurance that the U.S. Congress will appropriate supplemental funds. But the seizure of Norfolk by Confederate forces in April 1861 forestalled final completion of the project, with an amount owed to Parmenter. In 1874 and 1876, House Committee reports for private relief recommended that the outstanding amounts be paid.

== American Civil War ==
Julius Hermann Kroehl served in the Union Navy during the American Civil War.

=== Corps of Pontoniers ===
In May 1861, Alexander Asboth proposed to the War Department for the formation of an all-arms brigade consisting of infantry, cavalry, artillery, engineers and pontoniers. The main portion would have consisted of d'Utassy's 39th New York Volunteer Infantry Regiment – the Garibaldi Guards – and von Steinwehr's 29th New York Volunteer Infantry Regiment – the Astor Rifles – along with a corps of engineers and another of pontoniers. Julius Kroehl was proposed as the captain of the corps of pontoniers. However, Asboth's proposal was not accepted and the venture went no further.

=== Locomotive No. 160 ===
After the Union Army occupied Alexandria, Virginia in May 1861, military authorities requested the transfer of locomotives to that town in support of the upcoming campaign in northern Virginia. The Pennsylvania Railroad contributed six locomotives. These had to be ferried on a barge from Washington, DC, to Alexandria. In June 1861, Locomotive No. 160 and its tender fell into the Potomac River near Alexandria in 40 feet of water when a sudden squall caused the barge to shift its cargo. In early July 1861, Julius Kroehl, representing his firm of H&K, successfully recovered the locomotive and its tender.

=== New Orleans ===
Kroehl's first service for the Union was not as a soldier, but as a civilian contractor. On February 2, 1862, he received a contract to perform minesweeping in the Lower Mississippi River. His primary task was to remove the chain barrier stretching between Fort Jackson and Fort St. Philip. This was not successful, due to trying to move the bomb-vessel upstream against a strong current. After the fall of New Orleans, his services were dismissed on May 20, 1862 He provided a report to Navy Secretary Gideon Welles on submarine operations on June 2, 1862, after his return to New York City.

=== James River and Cape Fear ===
His services were still in demand. First, he demonstrated the use of electric torpedoes (mines) to be used in the James River. Later, both Admirals David Dixon Porter and Samuel P. Lee requested his services. He received a commission as an Acting Volunteer Lieutenant in the United States Navy on December 12, 1862. He was first assigned to Admiral Lee's North Atlantic Blockading Squadron off Wilmington, North Carolina. Attempts to use his torpedoes either to remove obstructions near Fort Caswell or supplement the blockade were stillborn. On January 1, 1863, he received orders to report to Admiral Porter for service in the Mississippi River Squadron.

=== Mississippi River and the Vicksburg Campaign ===
Kroehl served as a member of Admiral Porter's personal staff aboard the USS Black Hawk. His duties appear to be varied, responding to Porter's needs at the time: First, working with the U.S. Coast Survey in developing navigation charts of the Mississippi to support naval operations. Second, developing strategies to use torpedoes to destroy enemy vessels and underwater obstructions. During the Steele's Bayou Expedition he sank a coal barge on his own initiative which allowed the Union ships to retreat from a tenuous position. Later, he was assigned to work with the U.S. Artillery of Lauman's division during the siege of Vicksburg (June 6, 1863) until the end of the siege on July 4, 1863. During this time, he contracted malaria, and was honorably discharged on August 8, 1863, after being sent back to New York City by way of Cairo, Illinois. He recuperated at his brother's home. He recovered well enough to continue his civilian occupation as a submarine engineer, but was still suffering from it when he left for Central America.

== Pearl fishing in Panama ==
1864 Kroehl became chief engineer and shareholder of the Pacific Pearl Company. He built the Sub Marine Explorer in 1865. He successfully tested his craft in May 1866 at the Brooklyn Navy Yard. Later, in March 1867, he, with his crew and submarine, shipped out to Panama. He supervised its transport by rail once at Aspinwall (now Colón), and the vessel's reassembly at the Pacific side of the country.

Kroehl died on September 9, 1867, in Panama City, Panama, United States of Colombia, with death being attributed to "fever," and was buried there. It has been speculated that he died of decompression sickness, during experimental dives with the Sub Marine Explorer. However, the symptoms of decompression sickness do not match that of malaria. His widow, Sophia, argued that his death was from service-related malaria, citing witnesses who knew him during the Vicksburg campaign as well as medical statements.

Kroehl's body was buried in the Cementerio de Extranjeros (Foreigners' Cemetery), located in the Chorrillo district of Panama City, Republic of Panama. These cemeteries are reserved for Protestants, and Freemasons of any religious affiliation. Thomas Kilby Smith was the United States Consul who inventoried his possessions and reported the death.

On October 11, 2018, Kroehl's remains were exhumed to confirm his identity and the reason for his death. As a Civil War veteran, his remains are expected to be re-interred in the Corozal American Cemetery, near the Panama Canal.

== Widow's pension ==
Sophia was in a financially desperate situation. With over $40,000 tied up in a submarine that was left on Isla San Telmo, there was essentially no income. Any royalties from patents were expiring. She wrote to Admiral Porter for assistance. He provided her a letter of introduction, which probably resulted in her employment with the U.S. Department of the Treasury. However, attempts to collect on a pension for widows were thwarted by the circumstances of Julius' death.

The Pension Bureau assumed that the death was a result of the Panamanian environment. Sophia had to prove that the death was malaria, and that the malaria resulted from his military service. Attempts in 1880 and 1890 generated much paperwork, with sworn statements from neighbors attesting to their marriage and that she had not remarried, from Henry Kroehl about Julius' condition upon his discharge, a doctor's statement that he was diagnosed with malaria, and a statement from Alexander Strausz who served with him at Vicksburg. On top of that, she even had Archbishop John Ireland of the Roman Catholic Archdiocese of St. Paul, Minnesota, to lobby personally with the bureau. At first, the Bureau turned down the appeals. However, a few months before she died, her pension was increased substantially, indicating that she at one time proved her case.

== Conclusion ==
While researching records about Kroehl, statements about him have varied from being "a good officer, and a fine man, and under any circumstances would have sacrificed his life in the cause of his country" (Admiral Porter in widow's pension application) to being a "failure" (Admiral David Farragut). He had been cited in several Northern newspapers from the 1850s until his death.

== See also ==
- German inventors and discoverers
