= List of ship launches in 1901 =

The list of ship launches in 1901 includes a chronological list of ships launched in 1901. In cases where no official launching ceremony was held, the date built or completed may be used instead.

Date	Ship	Class and type	Builder	Location	Country	Notes
23 January	Osetr	Vnimatelni-class Destroyer	Forges et Chantiers de la Méditerranée	Le Havre	France	For the Imperial Russian Navy
29 January	Français	Français-class submarine	Arsenal de Cherbourg	Cherbourg	France	For the French Navy
19 February	Russell	Duncan-class battleship	Palmers	Jarrow	United Kingdom	
21 February	La Touques	Paddle Steamer	Forges et Chantiers de la Méditerranée	Le Havre	France	For: Cie. Normande de Navigation à Vapeur
23 February	Tsesarevich	Battleship	Forges et Chantiers de la Méditerranée	La Seyne	France	For the: Imperial Russian Navy
5 March	Albemarle	Duncan-class battleship	Chatham Dockyard	Chatham, Kent	United Kingdom	
5 March	Montagu	Duncan-class battleship	Devonport Dockyard	Plymouth	United Kingdom	
20 March	Algérie	Steamship	Forges et Chantiers de la Méditerranée	Le Havre	France	For Soc. Générale de Transports Maritimes à Vapeur
21 March	Duncan	Duncan-class battleship	Thames Ironworks	Leamouth	United Kingdom	
22 March	Barwon	Cargo ship	Blyth Shipbuilding & Dry Docks Co. Ltd	Blyth	United Kingdom	For Huddart Parker & Co. Pty. Ltd.
23 March	Simoun	Siroco-class seagoing torpedo boat	Forges et Chantiers de la Méditerranée	Le Havre	France	For the French Navy
30 March	Kronprinz Wilhelm	Passenger ship	AG Vulcan	Stettin	Germany|	
4 April	Celtic	Ocean liner; one of the "Big Four"	Harland & Wolff	Belfast	United Kingdom	For White Star Line.
16 April	Andrios	Cargo ship	Napier & Miller	Yoker	United Kingdom	
20 April	Hélène	Steam yacht	Forges et Chantiers de la Méditerranée	Le Havre	France	For Paul Mirabaud
25 April	Algérien	Français-class submarine	Arsenal de Cherbourg	Cherbourg	France	For the French Navy
4 May	Sirène	Sirène-class submarine	Arsenal de Cherbourg	Cherbourg	France	For the French Navy
17 May	Farfadet	Farfadet-class submarine	Arsenal de Rochefort	Rochefort	France	For the French Navy
18 May	Ryndam	Passenger ship	Harland & Wolff	Belfast	United Kingdom	For Holland America Line.
18 May	Ohio	Maine-class battleship	Union Iron Works	San Francisco, California	United States	
18 May	Lahaina	barquentine	W. A. Boole & Son	Oakland, California	United States	yard's first
29 May	Wasa	Äran-class coastal defence ship	Bergsunds Shipyard,	Stockholm	Sweden	For the Royal Swedish Navy
30 May	Regina Margherita	Regina Margherita-class battleship	La Spezia Naval Base	La Spezia	Italy	For the Regia Marina
4 June	Sully	Gloir-class cruiser	Forges et Chantiers de la Méditerranée	La Seyne	France	For the French Navy
6 June	Chauncy Maples			Lake Nyasa	Nyasaland|	Launched on Lake Nyasa having been transported from Scotland and reassembled
6 June	Wettin	Wittelsbach-class battleship	Schichau-Werke	Danzig	Germany	
7 June	Wisbech	Cargo ship	Blyth Shipbuilding & Dry Docks Co. Ltd	Blyth	United Kingdom	For Wisbech Steamship Co. Ltd.
12 June	Zähringen	Wittelsbach-class battleship	Germaniawerft	Kiel	Germany	
15 June	Typhon	Siroco-class seagoing torpedo boat	Forges et Chantiers de la Méditerranée	Le Havre	France	For the French Navy
22 June	Prinz Adalbert	Prinz Adalbert-class cruiser	Kaiserliche Werft Kiel	Kiel	Germany	
24 June	Princess Beara	Steam cutter	George Brown and Company	Greenock	United Kingdom	For Bantry Bay Steamship Co. The first vessel launched by George Brown and Company
6 July	United Kingdom	Harland & Wolff	Belfast	Walmer Castle	Passenger ship	For Union-Castle Line.
13 July	Triton	Sirène-class submarine	Arsenal de Cherbourg	Cherbourg	France	For the French Navy
13 July	United Kingdom	Thames Ironworks	Leamouth	Cornwallis	Duncan-class battleship	
16 July	Torpilleur N° 243	Experimetal turbine type torpedo boat	Forges et Chantiers de la Méditerranée	Le Havre	France	For the French Navy
16 July	United Kingdom	Armstrong Whitworth	Newcastle upon Tyne	Bantu	Cargo ship	Built for Bucknall Steamship Lines Ltd
16 July	United Kingdom	Allsup & Co. Ltd.	Preston	Seagull	Lightship	For Commissioners of Irish Lights.
17 July	Amiral Fourichon	Steamship	Forges et Chantiers de la Méditerranée	Le Havre	France	For Cie. Française de Navigation à Vapeur Chargeurs Réunis
22 July	United States	Crescent Shipyard	Elizabethport, New Jersey	Adder	Plunger-class submarine	
27 July	United States	William Cramp & Sons	Philadelphia, Pennsylvania	Maine	Maine-class battleship	
14 August	Sweden	Lindholmens Shipyard	Lindholmen	Äran	Äran-class coastal defence ship	For the Royal Swedish Navy
14 August	Roma	Steamship	Forges et Chantiers de la Méditerranée	La Seyne	France	For Cie. Française de Navigation à Vapeur
15 August	United Kingdom	Blyth Shipbuilding & Dry Docks Co. Ltd	Blyth	Battenhall	Cargo ship	For Lombard Steamship Co. Ltd.
16 August	Torpilleur N° 253	37‑metre type Normand (1899 tranche)	Forges et Chantiers de la Méditerranée	Le Havre	France	For the French Navy
17 August	United Kingdom	Harland & Wolff	Belfast	Athenic	Passenger ship	For White Star Line
19 August	Germany	Kaiserliche Werft Wilhelmshaven	Wilhelmshaven	Schwaben	Wittelsbach-class battleship	
20 August	United States	Crescent Shipyard	Elizabethport, New Jersey	Moccasin	Plunger-class submarine	Sponsored by Mrs. Rice
31 August	United Kingdom	Laird Brothers	Birkenhead	Exmouth	Duncan-class battleship	
31 August	Espadon	Sirène-class submarine	Arsenal de Cherbourg	Cherbourg	France	For the French Navy
11 September	Austria-Hungary	Stabilimento Tecnico Triestino	Trieste	Árpád	Habsburg-class battleship	For the Austro-Hungarian Navy
23 September	United States	Crescent Shipyard	Elizabethport, New Jersey	Porpoise	Plunger-class submarine	Sponsored by Mrs. E. B. Frost
25 September	Norway	Royal Norwegian Navy Shipyard	Horten	Sæl	1.-class torpedo boat	
28 September	United Kingdom	Harland & Wolff	Belfast	Noordam	Passenger ship	For Holland America Line.
28 September	Torpilleur N° 254	37‑metre type Normand (1899 tranche)	Forges et Chantiers de la Méditerranée	Le Havre	France	For the French Navy
30 September	United Kingdom	William Denny & Brothers	Dumbarton	Santhia	Passenger ship	For the British-India Steam Navigation Company
19 October	United States	Crescent Shipyard	Elizabethport	Shark	Plunger-class submarine	For the United States Navy; sponsored by Mrs. Walter Stevens Turpin
29 October	Silure	Sirène-class submarine	Arsenal de Cherbourg	Cherbourg	France	For the French Navy
29 October	Amiral Hamelin	Steampship	Forges et Chantiers de la Méditerranée	Le Havre	France	For Cie. Française de Navigation à Vapeur Chargeurs Réunis
31 October	Torpilleur N° 255	37‑metre type Normand (1899 tranche)	Forges et Chantiers de la Méditerranée	Le Havre	France	For the French Navy
7 November	Sweden	Kockums Shipyard	Malmö	Tapperheten	Äran-class coastal defence ship	For the Royal Swedish Navy
7 November	Italy	Castellammare Royal Dockyard	Castellammare di Stabia	Benedetto Brin	Regina Margherita-class battleship	For the Regia Marina
9 November	Germany	AG Vulcan	Stettin	Mecklenburg	Wittelsbach-class battleship	
14 November	United Kingdom	Blyth Shipbuilding & Dry Docks Co. Ltd	Blyth	Lady Mildred	Cargo ship	For Exchange Steamship Co. Ltd.
27 November	Kefal	Vnimatelni-class Destroyer	Forges et Chantiers de la Méditerranée	Le Havre	France	For the Imperial Russian Navy
28 November	United Kingdom	Harland & Wolff	Belfast	Warwickshire	Passenger ship	For Bibby Steamship Co.
29 November	Torpilleur N° 256	37‑metre type Normand (1899 tranche)	Forges et Chantiers de la Méditerranée	Le Havre	France	For the French Navy
12 December	United Kingdom	Harland & Wolff	Belfast	Minnetonka	Passenger ship	For Atlantic Transport Co.
23 December	United States	Maryland Steel Company	Sparrows Point, Maryland	Shawmut	Cargo ship	For Boston Steamship Company, later renamed Ancon.
28 December	United States	Newport News Shipbuilding	Newport News, Virginia	Missouri	Maine-class battleship	
28 December	Jeanne Cordonnier	Sailing barque	Forges et Chantiers de la Méditerranée	Le Havre	France	For Soc. des Voiliers Français
Unknown date	United Kingdom	John Bowden	Porthleven	Ada	Steam drifter	For Northern Steam Herring Fisheries Ltd.
Unknown date	United Kingdom	John Bowden	Porthleven	Clara	Steam drifter	For Northern Steam Herring Fisheries Ltd.
Unknown date	United Kingdom	John Bowden	Porthleven	Glentana	Steam drifter	For Steam Herring Fleet Ltd.
Unknown date	United Kingdom	William Denny and Brothers	Dumbarton	King Edward	Passenger ship	For private owner.
Unknown date	United Kingdom	Beeching Brothers Ltd.	Great Yarmouth	King Edward	Steam drifter	For John Moore.
Unknown date	United Kingdom	Allsup & Co. Ltd.	Preston	Lord Kitchener	Steamboat	For David & William Monk.
Unknown date	United Kingdom	Beeching Brothers Ltd.	Great Yarmouth	Queen Alexandra	Steam drifter	For William Clowes.
Unknown date	United Kingdom	Beeching Brothers Ltd.	Great Yarmouth	Snowdrop	Steam drifter	For Pitchers Ltd.
Unknown date	United Kingdom	Beeching Brothers Ltd.	Great Yarmouth	Star of the Sea	Steam drifter	For James Murray.
Unknown date	United Kingdom	T. Scott & Company	Goole	Sudan	Steamship	For private owner.
Unknown date	United Kingdom	Beeching Brothers Ltd.	Great Yarmouth	Sunflower	Steam drifter	For John Salmon.
Unknown date	United States	J. M. Bayles and Sons	Port Jefferson, New York	Zoraya	Armed yacht	Built as a private vessel, leased for World War I service by the U.S. Navy in 1917, returned to its owner in 1919.
