= List of ship commissionings in 1903 =

The list of ship commissionings in 1903 is a chronological list of ships commissioned in 1903. In cases where no official commissioning ceremony was held, the date of service entry may be used instead.

Date	Operator	Ship	Class and type	Notes
January 12	United States Navy	Adder	Plunger-class submarine	
January 17	United States Navy	Moccasin	Plunger-class submarine	
February 17	Imperial German Navy	Frauenlob	Gazelle-class cruiser	
February 19	Royal Navy	Russell	Duncan-class battleship	
April (unknown date)	Swedish Navy	Tapperheten	Äran-class coastal defence ship	
May 12	Imperial German Navy	Arcona	Gazelle-class cruiser	
May 25	Imperial German Navy	Mecklenburg	Wittelsbach-class battleship	
May 28	United States Navy	Grampus	Plunger-class submarine	
May 28	United States Navy	Pike	Plunger-class submarine	
June 2	Royal Navy	Exmouth	Duncan-class battleship	
June 10	Spanish Navy	Princesa de Asturias	Princesa de Asturias-class armored cruiser	
June 15	Austro-Hungarian Navy	Árpád	Habsburg-class battleship	
July 28	Royal Navy	Montagu	Duncan-class battleship	
September 19	United States Navy	Plunger	Plunger-class submarine	
September 19	United States Navy	Porpoise	Plunger-class submarine	
September 19	United States Navy	Shark	Plunger-class submarine	
October 8	Royal Navy	Duncan	Duncan-class battleship	
November 3	United States Navy	Abarenda	collier	
November 12	Royal Navy	Albemarle	Duncan-class battleship	
December 1	United States Navy	Missouri	Maine-class battleship	
December 12	Imperial German Navy	Friedrich Carl	Prinz Adalbert-class cruiser	
