= List of ship commissionings in 1908 =

The list of ship commissionings in 1908 includes a chronological list of ships commissioned in 1908. In cases where no official commissioning ceremony was held, the date of service entry may be used instead.

Date	Operator	Ship	Pennant	Class and type	Notes
9 January	French Navy	Démocratie		Liberté-class battleship	
1 February	United States Navy	Mississippi	BB-23	Mississippi-class battleship	sold to Greece, 8 July 1914
1 February	Imperial German Navy	Stuttgart		Königsberg-class cruiser	
6 March	Imperial German Navy	Gneisenau		Scharnhorst-class cruiser	
19 March	United States Navy	New Hampshire	BB-25	Connecticut-class battleship	
1 April	United States Navy	Idaho	BB-24	Mississippi-class battleship	sold to Greece, 8 July 1914
7 April	Spanish Navy	Cataluña		Princesa de Asturias-class armored cruiser	Sold 1930; scrapped
10 April	Imperial German Navy	Nürnberg		Königsberg-class cruiser	
13 April	French Navy	Liberté		Liberté-class battleship	
15 April	French Navy	Justice		Liberté-class battleship	
5 May	Imperial German Navy	Schlesien		Deutschland-class battleship	
8 June	United States Navy	Pike	Submarine Torpedo Boat No. 6	Plunger-class submarine	recommissioned
13 June	United States Navy	Grampus	Submarine Torpedo Boat No. 4	Plunger-class submarine	recommissioned from reserve at Mare Island Navy Yard
25 June	Royal Navy	Agamemnon		Lord Nelson-class battleship	
25 June	Royal Navy	Indomitable		Invincible-class battlecruiser	
6 July	Imperial German Navy	Schleswig-Holstein		Deutschland-class battleship	
14 August	United States Navy	Shark	Submarine Torpedo Boat No. 8	Plunger-class submarine	recommissioned at Cavite, Philippines
11 September	French Navy	Vérité		Liberté-class battleship	
20 October	Royal Navy	Inflexible		Invincible-class battlecruiser	
14 November	Imperial German Navy	Dresden		Dresden-class cruiser	
20 November	United States Navy	Porpoise	Submarine Torpedo Boat No. 7	Plunger-class submarine	recommissioned at Cavite, Philippines
1 December	Royal Navy	Lord Nelson		Lord Nelson-class battleship	
