= USS Plunger (SS-2) =

Submarine of the United States

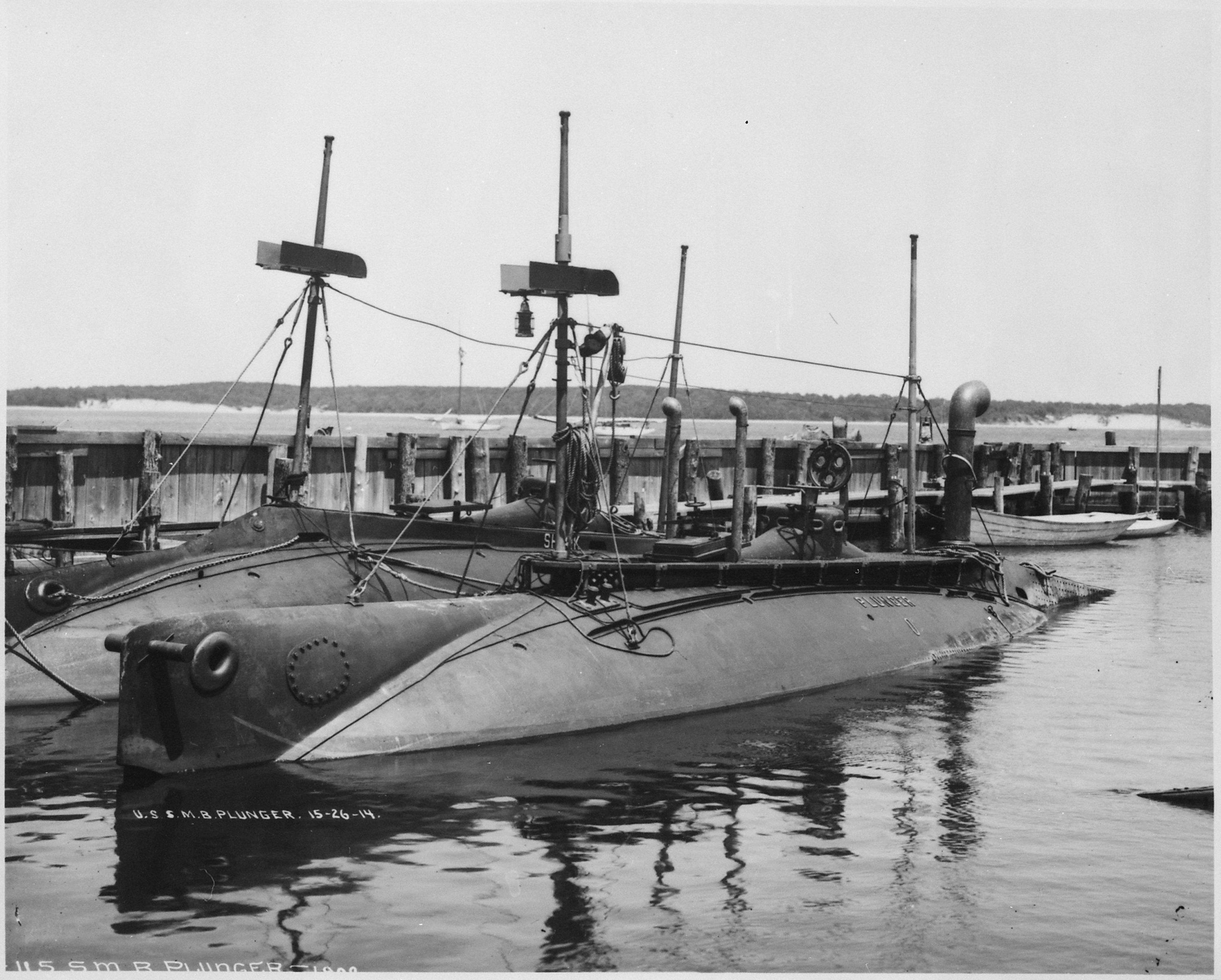
- USS Plunger in 1902

History

United States
- Name: Plunger
- Namesake: A diver or daring gambler
- Builder: Crescent Shipyard, Elizabeth, New Jersey
- Laid down: 21 May 1901
- Launched: 1 February 1902
- Sponsored by: Miss Ernestine Wardwell
- Commissioned: 19 September 1903
- Decommissioned: 3 November 1905
- Recommissioned: 23 February 1907
- Renamed: A-1 (Submarine Torpedo Boat No.2), 17 November 1911
- Stricken: 24 February 1913
- Identification: Hull symbol: SS-2 (17 July 1920); Call sign: NQE
- Fate: Sold for scrapping, 26 January 1922

General characteristics
- Class & type: Plunger-class submarine
- Displacement: 107 long tons (109 t) surfaced; 123 long tons (125 t) submerged
- Length: 63 ft 10 in (19.46 m)
- Beam: 11 ft 11 in (3.63 m)
- Draft: 10 ft 7 in (3.23 m)
- Installed power: 160 bhp (120 kW) surfaced; 150 bhp (110 kW) submerged
- Propulsion: 1 × Otto Gas Engine Works gas engine; 1 × Electro Dynamic electric motor; 60-cell battery; 1 × shaft
- Speed: 8 kn (15 km/h; 9.2 mph) surfaced; 7 kn (13 km/h; 8.1 mph) submerged
- Test depth: 150 ft (46 m)
- Complement: 1 officer; 6 enlisted
- Armament: 1 × 17.7 in (450 mm) "18-in" torpedo tube (5 torpedoes)

USS Plunger/A-1 (SS-2) was one of the earliest submarines of the United States Navy. She was the lead boat of Plunger class and later renamed A-1 when she was designated an A-type submarine. She is not to be confused with the experimental submarine Plunger (1897) which was evaluated by the US Navy from 1898 to 1900, but not accepted or commissioned.

== Design ==
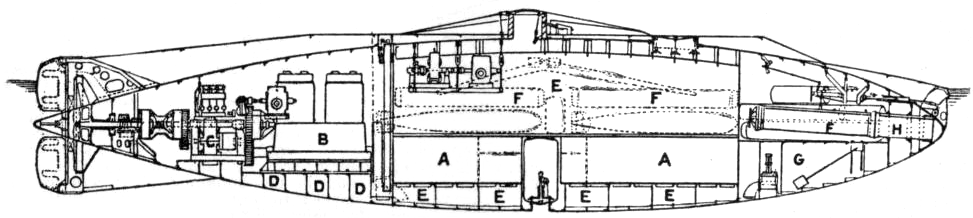
Plan of Plunger-class. A, storage batteries; B, gas-engine; C, dynamo and motor; D, water-tight compartments; E, main ballast tanks; F, air-flasks; G, gasolene tank; H, expulsion tube.

The Plunger-class submarines were enlarged and improved versions of the preceding Holland, the first submarine in the USN. They had a length of 63 ft 10 in (19.5 m) overall, a beam of 11 ft 11 in (3.6 m) and a mean draft of 10 ft 7 in (3.2 m). They displaced 107 long tons (109 t) on the surface and 123 long tons (125 t) submerged. The Plunger-class boats had a crew of one officer and six enlisted men. They had a diving depth of 150 feet (45.7 m).

For surface running, they were powered by one 180-brake-horsepower (134 kW) gasoline engine that drove the single propeller. When submerged the propeller was driven by a 70-horsepower (52 kW) electric motor. The boats could reach 8 kn (15 km/h; 9.2 mph) on the surface and 7 kn (13 km/h; 8.1 mph) underwater.

The Plunger-class boats were armed with one 18-inch (457 mm) torpedo tube in the bow. They carried four reloads, for a total of five torpedoes.

== Construction ==
Plunger was laid down on 21 May 1901, at Elizabethport, New Jersey, at Lewis Nixon's Crescent Shipyard, a subcontractor for the John P. Holland's Holland Torpedo Boat Company. She was launched on 1 February 1902; sponsored by Miss Ernestine Wardwell, of Baltimore, Maryland; and commissioned at the Holland Torpedo Boat Company yard, at New Suffolk, New York, on 19 September 1903.

== Service history ==
Assigned to the Naval Torpedo Station at Newport, Rhode Island, for experimental torpedo work, Plunger operated locally from that facility for the next two years, a period of time broken only by an overhaul at the Holland yard, at New Suffolk, from March to November 1904. Besides testing machinery, armament and tactics, the submarine torpedo boat also served as a training ship for the crews of new submersibles emerging from the builder's yards.

In August 1905, Plunger underwent two weeks of upkeep before leaving the yard on 22 August. She was towed by the tug Apache to New York City, where Plunger conducted trials near the home of President Theodore Roosevelt. Upon the submarine's arrival that afternoon, she moored alongside the tug and prepared for a visit from the President.

=== Roosevelt visit ===
The following morning, Plunger charged her batteries and made a series of five short dives before returning alongside Apache to recharge. Later that afternoon, Roosevelt boarded Plunger and stayed aboard for almost two hours while she made another series of dives before returning to moor alongside the tug. Roosevelt spent almost another hour on board the submarine before he disembarked.

Roosevelt's novel voyage prompted significant interest. On 6 September, Roosevelt wrote from Oyster Bay, to Hermann Speck von Sternburg: "I myself am both amused and interested as to what you say about the interest excited about my trip in the Plunger. I went down in it chiefly because I did not like to have the officers and enlisted men think I wanted them to try things I was reluctant to try myself. I believe a good deal can be done with these submarines, although there is always the danger of people getting carried away with the idea and thinking that they can be of more use than they possibly could be." To another correspondent he declared that never in his life had he experienced "such a diverting day ... nor so much enjoyment in so few hours."

== Later service ==
Decommissioned on 3 November 1905, Plunger remained inactive until she was recommissioned on 23 February 1907, she was assigned to the First Submarine Flotilla, based at the New York Navy Yard, joining sister ships Porpoise and Shark. On 3 May 1909, Ensign Chester Nimitz, the future fleet admiral who would say he considered the submarines of the time "a cross between a Jules Verne fantasy and a humpbacked whale", assumed command of Plunger. That September, the submarine torpedo boat visited New York City to take part in the Hudson-Fulton celebrations. Nimitz commanded Plunger until he assumed command of Snapper (later renamed C-5), when that submarine was commissioned on 2 February 1910.

Reassigned to the Charleston Navy Yard, Plunger reached that port on 24 October 1909, and moored alongside the gunboat Castine, the tender for the Atlantic Submarine Flotilla. Shortly thereafter, Castine's medical officer, Assistant Surgeon Micajah Boland, inspected Plunger and two other submarine torpedo boats. His report graphically described living conditions on these boats. He found "their sanitary condition to be far from satisfactory, notwithstanding the fact that they had been at sea only about forty-five hours."

"One officer and a crew of 10 or 12 men, had been living, that is, sleeping, cooking, eating, and answering the calls of nature aboard each of these boats in addition to performing their duty navigating them. Being small, they pitch and roll considerably in a smooth sea, and about half the crew become seasick, due largely to the foul air in the boats; when the sea is moderately rough, practically the whole crew is seasick. Food has to be carried in crates and, when preparing for a cruise of several days, cramps very much the already overcrowded boat; even the cooked meats soon spoil, increasing the foulness of the air, and the use of the toilet, which is only screened off, adds to the unpleasant odor. The small electric stoves with which the boats are supplied can not furnish heat enough, hence they are cold and damp at certain seasons of the year and, in rough weather when water is shipped down the conning tower hatch, which must be kept open, they are wet and extremely uncomfortable. These conditions are a serious menace to the health of the members of the crew; there seems to be no remedy for them on prolonged cruises."

Surgeon Boland recommended that cruises be limited to 36 hours and that when not underway the crews of the submarines, "except those absolutely necessary to be on the boats", live on board the "parent ship."

== Fate ==
Assigned to the Reserve Torpedo Division on 12 April 1910, Plunger was renamed A-1 on 17 November 1911. She was stricken from the Naval Vessel Register on 24 February 1913.

On 29 August 1916, A-1 had been authorized for use as an "experimental target, designated 'Target E'". Approximately 22 March 1918, she sank at New Suffolk. Raised and sent to the Salvage Diving School at New London, Connecticut, she was ultimately hoisted on board the hulk of the former monitor Puritan and authorized for sale in 1921, on an "as is, where is" basis. She was sold for scrapping on 26 January 1922.

== Bibliography ==
- Mohl, Michael. "Plunger (SS-2)". Navsource.net.
- Evans, Mark L. (25 June 2018). "Plunger I (Submarine Torpedo Boat No. 2)". Dictionary of American Naval Fighting Ships. Navy Department, Naval History and Heritage Command. This article incorporates text from this source, which is in the public domain.
- Friedman, Norman (1995). U.S. Submarines Through 1945: An Illustrated Design History. Annapolis, Maryland: Naval Institute Press. ISBN 1-55750-263-3.
- Gardiner, Robert & Gray, Randal, eds. (1985). Conway's All the World's Fighting Ships 1906–1921. Annapolis, Maryland: Naval Institute Press. ISBN 0-85177-245-5.
- "Teddy Roosevelt trip aboard Plunger". militaryhonors.sid-hill.us. Archived from the original on 10 March 2018.
- "Records of the T. A. Scott co". mysticseaport.org. 20 May 2016. Archived from the original on 16 April 2021.
