= List of ship decommissionings in 1921 =

The list of ship commissionings in 1921 is a chronological list of ships commissioned in 1921. In cases where no official commissioning ceremony was held, the date of service entry may be used instead. For ships lost at sea, see list of shipwrecks in 1921 instead.

Date	Operator	Ship	Pennant	Class and type	Notes
May 9	Royal Navy	Tristram		Modified R-class destroyer	Scrapped
July 17	United States Navy	A-3	SS-4	Plunger-class submarine	at Cavite Navy Yard, Philippines, disposed of as a target ship and stricken in 1922
July 25	United States Navy	A-5	SS-6	Plunger-class submarine	at Cavite Navy Yard, Philippines, disposed of as a target ship and stricken in 1922
October 6	United States Navy	Aramis	SP-418	Patrol vessel	Tender and houseboat 1924-1933; Sold 1933
November 15	Royal Navy	Tirade		Modified R-class destroyer	Scrapped
December 1	French Navy	Foudre		Seaplane tender and training ship	date stricken; later scrapped
December 12	Royal Australian Navy	Australia		Indefatigable-class battlecruiser	Scuttled in 1924
unknown date	United States Navy	Ardent	SP-680	Patrol vessel/minesweeper	Sold
