= List of ship decommissionings in 1913 =

The list of ship decommissionings in 1913 includes a chronological list of ships decommissioned in 1913. In cases where no official decommissioning ceremony was held, the date of withdrawal from service may be used instead. For ships lost at sea, see list of shipwrecks in 1913 instead.

Date	Operator	Ship	Pennant	Class and type	Fate and other notes
24 February	United States Navy	USS Plunger	SS-2	Plunger-class submarine	sold for scrap

== Bibliography ==
- Silverstone, Paul H. (2006). The New Navy 1883–1922. The U.S. Navy Warship Series. New York: Routledge. ISBN 978-0-415-97871-2.
