= USS Hector (AC-7) =

Collier of the United States Navy

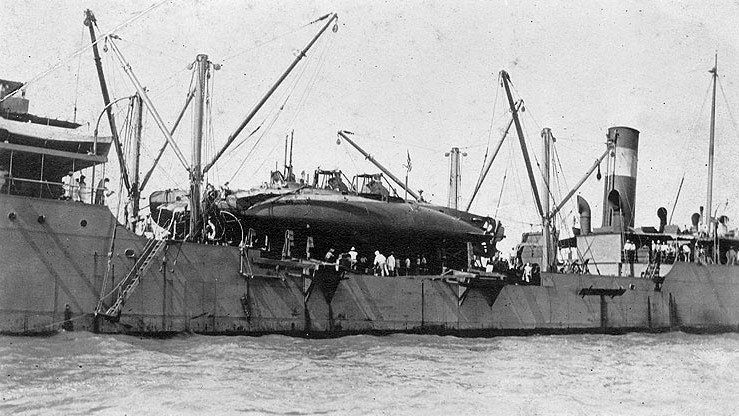
- Off the Cavite Navy Yard, Philippine Islands, circa March 1915, with submarines A-3, A-5 and B-1 on deck, after transporting them out from the United States. - B-1 is on Hector's starboard side. The two A-boats are in the center and port side cradles.

History

United States
- Name: USS Hector
- Namesake: Hector
- Builder: Maryland Steel Company, Sparrows Point, Maryland
- Launched: 3 July 1909
- Commissioned: 22 October 1909
- Stricken: 1916 (est.)
- Home port: Norfolk, Virginia
- Fate: Wrecked off the Atlantic coast, 14 July 1916; Sank three days later

General characteristics
- Type: Collier
- Displacement: 11,230 long tons (11,410 t)
- Length: 403 ft (123 m)
- Beam: 53 ft (16 m)
- Draft: 24 ft 8 in (7.52 m)
- Propulsion: Steam engine
- Speed: 12 knots (22 km/h; 14 mph)
- Complement: 82 officers and enlisted

USS Hector (AC-7) was a collier acquired by the United States Navy prior to World War I. She carried coal to those ships still using it as fuel to build up steam for their engines, and continued that service until her wrecking and sinking in 1916. She was the sister ship of USS Mars.

== Construction and career ==
Hector — the second ship to be so named by the U.S. Navy — was launched on 3 July 1909 by the Maryland Steel Company, Sparrows Point, Maryland and commissioned on 22 October 1909.

She was on special service with the Atlantic Fleet from commissioning through 1913, when she was stationed at Norfolk, Virginia. From there, Hector served as a fuel ship, ferrying freight and fuel up the U.S. East Coast and down to the Caribbean, especially Guantánamo Bay and Santo Domingo.

=== Sinking of Hector ===
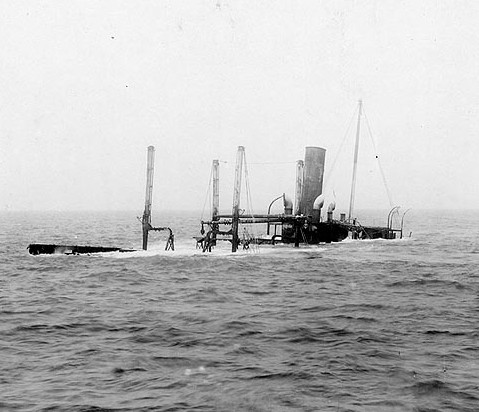
After part of the ship, photographed from her forward part, some time after she was wrecked off the U.S. Atlantic Coast on 14 July 1916.

Hector was battered by winds of 100–120 mph (160–190 km/h) for 16 hours during the Charleston Hurricane of 1916 while at sea in the Atlantic Ocean off South Carolina. She was disabled when hatches gave way and her boiler room flooded. The ship was wrecked on a reef off Point Romaine, South Carolina on 14 July 1916, breaking in two and sank three days later.
