= Plunger-class submarine =

United States Navy submarine class

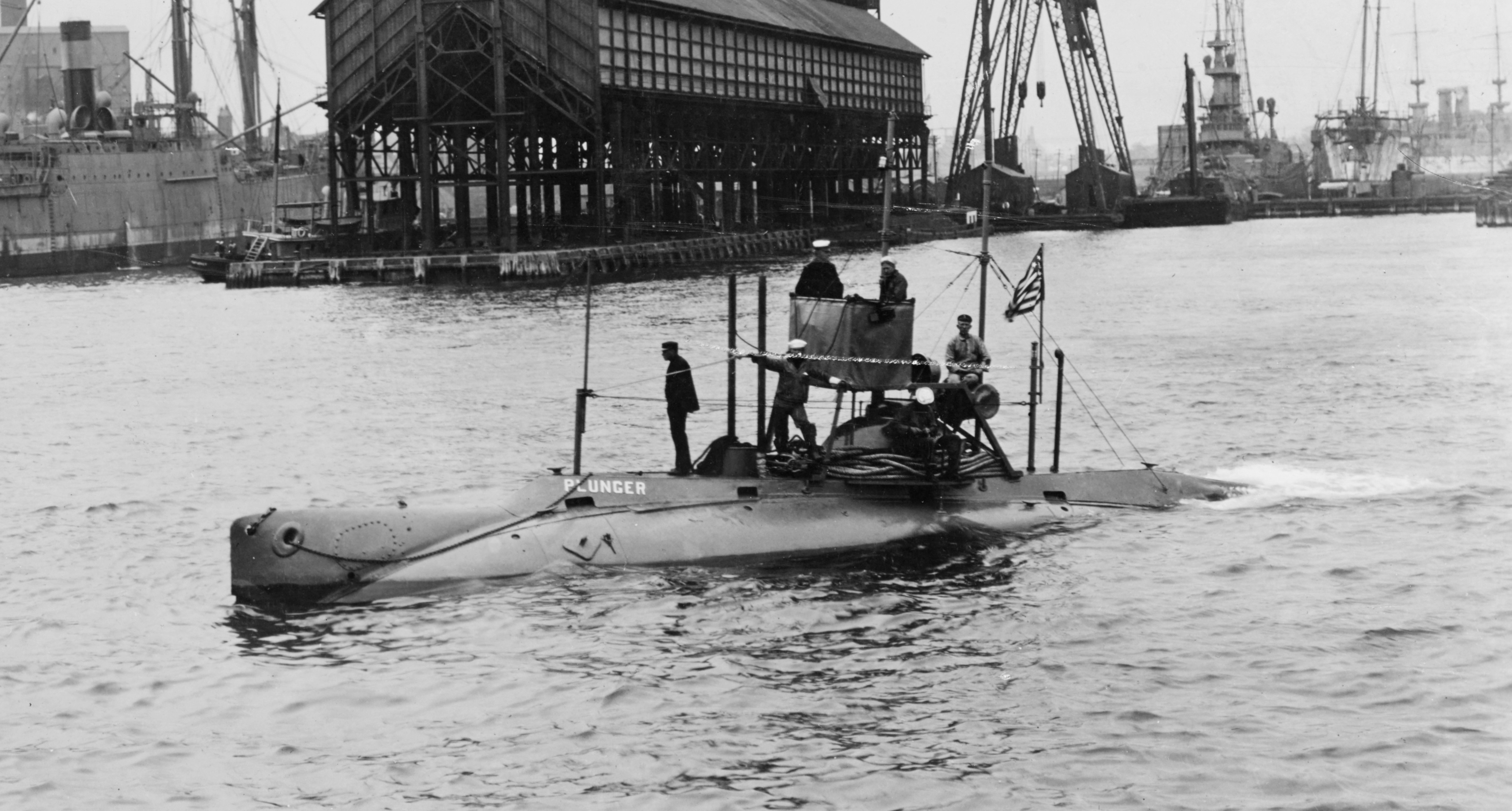
- USS Plunger (SS-2)

Class overview
- Builders: Electric Boat (design); Crescent Shipyard (SS-2, -3, -5, -7, -8); Union Iron Works (SS-4, SS-6)
- Operators: United States Navy
- Preceded by: USS Holland
- Succeeded by: B class
- Built: 1900–1903
- In commission: 1903–1921
- Completed: 7
- Retired: 7

General characteristics
- Type: midget submarine
- Displacement: 107 long tons (109 t) surfaced; 123 long tons (125 t) submerged
- Length: 63 ft 10 in (19.46 m)
- Beam: 11 ft 11 in (3.63 m)
- Draft: 10 ft 7 in (3.23 m)
- Installed power: 160 bhp (120 kW) surfaced; 150 bhp (110 kW) submerged
- Propulsion: 1 × Otto Gas Engine Works gas engine; 1 × Electro Dynamic electric motor; 60-cell battery; 1 × shaft
- Speed: 8 kn (15 km/h; 9.2 mph) surfaced; 7 kn (13 km/h; 8.1 mph) submerged
- Test depth: 150 ft (46 m)
- Complement: 1 officer; 6 enlisted
- Armament: 1 × 18-inch (450 mm) torpedo tube (3 long or 5 short torpedoes)

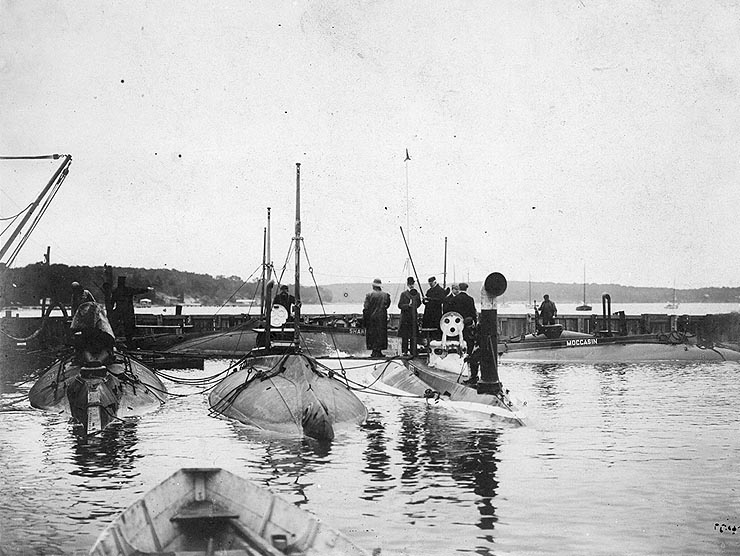
Plunger, Adder, Moccasin, Porpoise, and Shark at New Suffolk, New York circa 1903.

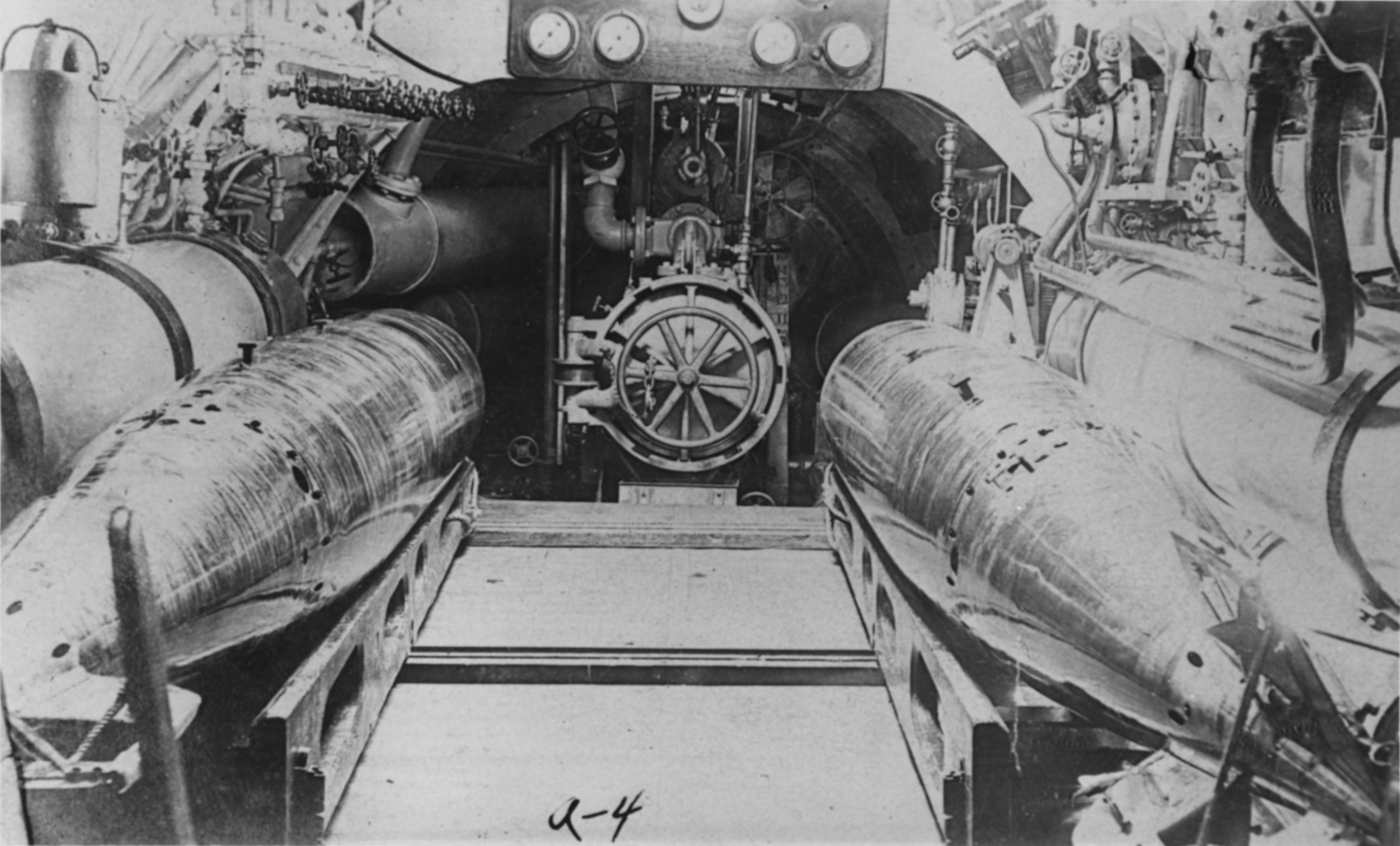
A 1912 view of the breech of the sole torpedo tube of USS Moccasin / A-4. Two torpedoes are on wooden skids in the foreground. The skids slid across the deck for loading.

The Plunger class was an early class of United States Navy submarines. In the first years of their service, they were used primarily as training and experimental vessels for the newly formed "silent service" to familiarize naval personnel with the performance and operations of such craft. They were known as the "A class" after being renamed to A-type designations (A-1 through A-7) on 17 November 1911. All except Plunger ended up being stationed in the Philippines, an American possession, prior to the outbreak of World War I. They were shipped there on colliers (coal-carrying ships) and formed an integral part of the harbor defense system for Manila. In some instances, this class of submarines is referred to as the Adder class, as USS Adder was the first boat of the class to be completed.

== Design and construction ==
These boats were essentially an enlarged and improved version of the Holland, with a much more powerful 4-cylinder, 160 bhp (120 kW) Otto engine and an enlarged battery. Their increased size allowed a crewman to stand upright inside the boat. They were designed by Electric Boat under the direct supervision of John Philip Holland and were known to the company as design EB 7. The design was considered such an advance over the Holland that the company took the unusual step of ordering a prototype of the class using internal company funds. The prototype, named Fulton, was built at Lewis Nixon's Crescent Shipyard, in New Jersey. It was a fortunate move, as the Fulton's company trials turned up numerous deficiencies that needed to be corrected. These trials, along with the need to correct the noted deficiencies delayed the building of the Plungers. On average the boats were delivered to the Navy two years late. Although Fulton eventually did quite well on trials, proving the capabilities of the Plungers, there were no approved appropriations from the Navy to purchase her so she was sold to the Russian Navy, and renamed Som.

A single hull design, all ballast and fuel tanks were located internally. The battery had 60 cells located underneath the torpedo reloads and was 24% more powerful than the one installed on Holland. The battery was open-topped, and when the decking was removed the battery acid could be seen sloshing around inside the cells. The top was shellacked wooden planks, with a layer of rubber above and finally a shellacked canvas covering. Holland's emphasis was on optimizing underwater performance, and thus the boats had very little superstructure topside and a very small conning tower. Since these boats were intended for harbor defense and would be operating in relatively calm waters, this was not initially considered a problem. They were not internally subdivided, there was essentially one large compartment from bow to stern. One man, a very busy Commanding Officer, stood on a raised platform amidships with his head up inside the conning tower so he could see out of the small deadlight windows there. Initially there were no periscopes. Several wheels and control levers were within reach of this station, with the Commanding Officer acting as both a helmsman and a diving plane operator. He kept track of his bearings and any potential target by periodically broaching the boat so he could see out of the deadlights. The designed test depth was 100 ft (30 m), although Porpoise survived an accidental grounding at 144 ft (44 m) in 1904.

Builder's and Navy trials of the class noted several defects that needed to be corrected. Ventilation of the gasoline engine was poor, the main switchboard needed to be relocated, the 30-foot-long (9.1 m) depth gauge was inadequate, the torpedo tube muzzle door was awkward to use, and periscopes were highly desired. Most notably, the lack of superstructure and the short conning tower made these boats prone to flooding when surfaced in even a moderate sea state. A modification program was drawn up and approved by the Navy and starting in January 1905, the boats were taken in hand for the needed work. Eventually most of the boats were fitted with two fixed height periscopes, with a taller conning tower that had a large fairwater built around it. A removeable bow fairing was put in place to increase seaworthiness, helping to push the bow wake away from the conning tower. Since the boats found themselves spending more time on the surface than originally thought, a surface steering station was added forward of the conning tower fairwater, connected by a shaft to the main steering mechanism below. A small, metal framework and canvas bridge structure could be erected topside for extended surface transits. It had to be disassembled and taken below before diving. The diving process was quite lengthy and complicated, taking several minutes from being fully surfaced to fully submerged. The tactical environment that these boats operated in did not necessitate quick dives, thus the lengthy dive process was not seen as a liability.

At this point in their corporate history, Electric Boat was a design and engineering firm only. They did not have their own shipyard and thus sub-contracted out the construction of all their boats. The Plunger class was built at two different locations on both coasts of the United States. Five were built at the Crescent Shipyard, in Elizabethport, New Jersey, while two more were built at Union Iron Works, in San Francisco.

== Service ==
The five East Coast boats were based at the Holland Torpedo Boat Station, at New Suffolk, New York, from 1903 until 1905, allowing New Suffolk to claim to be the first submarine base in the United States. As of January 1905, Grampus and Pike were at the Mare Island Navy Yard, Plunger, Porpoise, and Shark were at the New York Navy Yard, and Adder and Moccasin were assigned to Reserve Torpedo Flotilla, in Norfolk, Virginia.

In 1908, Adder, Moccasin, Porpoise, and Shark, were moved on ships to Subic Bay, in the Philippines, where they served through the First World War. They were joined in 1915, by A-3, ex-Grampus, and A-5, ex-Pike. Plunger (A-1) served at Charleston, South Carolina, until she was decommissioned in 1913.

After the initial deficiencies were worked out these boats served the Navy quite well for their entire service lives. They were considered pathfinders in submarine technology, and the design drew great interest from foreign navies. A slightly modified design, EB 7P, formed the basis for the first submarines of the British Royal Navy, and the navies of Japan, the Netherlands, and Imperial Russia. However, the rapidly advancing military technology of the early 20th century quickly made these boats obsolescent, and by the end of World War I they were completely outmoded. A-2, A-4, A-6, and A-7 were all decommissioned in December 1919.

The class was given alphanumeric hull classification symbols (SS-2, SS-3, etc.) on 17 July 1920, after all but A-3 (SS-4) and A-5 (SS-6) had been decommissioned. A-3 and A-5 were decommissioned in July 1921. All boats in the class, except A-1, were used as targets. They were stricken from the Naval Vessel Register on 16 January 1922 and sold for scrap.

== Boats in class ==
Plunger / A-1
Designation:	Submarine Torpedo Boat No. 2, SS-2
Builders:	Crescent Shipyard in Elizabethport, New Jersey
Laid down:	21 May 1901
Launched:	1 February 1902 (List)
Operator:	United States Navy
Commissioned:	19 September 1903 (List)
Decommissioned:	24 February 1913 (List)
Fate:	Sold for scrap 26 January 1922
Operations:	Torpedo testing, training, Theodore Roosevelt tour. Second US Navy submarine to be decommissioned.

Adder / A-2
Designation:	Submarine Torpedo Boat No. 3, SS-3
Builders:	Crescent Shipyard in Elizabethport, New Jersey
Laid down:	3 October 1900
Launched:	22 July 1901 (List)
Operator:	United States Navy
Commissioned:	12 January 1903 (List)
Decommissioned:	12 December 1919 (List)
Fate:	Sunk as a target ship
Operations:	Torpedo testing, training, peace time patrol. Moved to Philippines in 1909.

Grampus / A-3
Designation:	Submarine Torpedo Boat No. 4, SS-4
Builders:	Union Iron Works in San Francisco, California
Laid down:	10 December 1900
Launched:	31 July 1902 (List)
Operator:	United States Navy
Commissioned:	28 May 1903 (List)
Decommissioned:	25 July 1921 (List)
Fate:	Struck 16 January 1922 and sunk as a target ship
Operations:	San Francisco earthquake of 1906 relief efforts. Moved to Philippines in 1915.

Moccasin / A-4
Designation:	Submarine Torpedo Boat No. 5, SS-5
Builders:	Crescent Shipyard in Elizabethport, New Jersey
Laid down:	8 November 1900
Launched:	20 August 1901 (List)
Operator:	United States Navy
Commissioned:	17 January 1903 (List)
Decommissioned:	12 December 1919 (List)
Fate:	Target ship
Operations:	Training, trials, peacetime patrol. Moved to Philippines in 1909.

Pike / A-5
Designation:	Submarine Torpedo Boat No. 6, SS-6
Builders:	Union Iron Works in San Francisco, California
Laid down:	10 December 1900
Launched:	14 January 1903 (List)
Operator:	United States Navy
Commissioned:	28 May 1903 (List)
Decommissioned:	25 July 1921 (List)
Fate:	Sold for scrap 26 January 1922
Operations:	San Francisco earthquake of 1906 recovery efforts, training & trials, harbor patrol. Moved to Philippines in 1915.

Porpoise, A-6
Designation:	Submarine Torpedo Boat No. 7, SS-7
Builders:	Crescent Shipyard in Elizabethport, New Jersey
Laid down:	13 December 1900
Launched:	23 September 1901 (List)
Operator:	United States Navy
Commissioned:	19 September 1903 (List)
Decommissioned:	12 December 1919 (List)
Fate:	Target ship
Operations:	Whiting experiment, other trials, harbor patrols. Moved to Philippines in 1908.

USS Shark, A-7
Designation:	Submarine Torpedo Boat No. 8, SS-8
Builders:	Crescent Shipyard in Elizabethport, New Jersey
Laid down:	11 January 1901
Launched:	19 October 1901 (List)
Operator:	United States Navy
Commissioned:	19 September 1903 (List)
Decommissioned:	12 December 1919 (List)
Fate:	Target ship
Operations:	Torpedo and other trials, Manila Bay patrols. Moved to Philippines in 1908.

== See also ==
- Holland-class submarine (British Royal Navy version)

== Bibliography ==
- Bauer, K. Jack; Roberts, Stephen S. (1991). Register of Ships of the U.S. Navy, 1775-1990: Major Combatants. Westport, Connecticut: Greenwood Press. ISBN 0-313-26202-0.
- Friedman, Norman (1995). U.S. Submarines Through 1945: An Illustrated Design History. Annapolis, Maryland: Naval Institute Press. pp. 285–304. ISBN 1-55750-263-3.
- Gardiner, Robert; Gray, Randal (1985). Conway's All the World's Fighting Ships 1906-1921. London: Conway Maritime Press. ISBN 0-85177-245-5.
- Silverstone, Paul H. (1970). U.S. Warships of World War I. London: Ian Allan. ISBN 0-71100-095-6.
- Wright, C. C. (2003). "Question 40/02: Submarines Expended as Targets 1922". Warship International. XL (4): 286–298. ISSN 0043-0374.
- Christley, Jim (2011). US Submarines 1900-35. Great Britain: Osprey Publishing. ISBN 978-1-84908-185-6.
