= USS Marcus =

Clemson-class destroyer

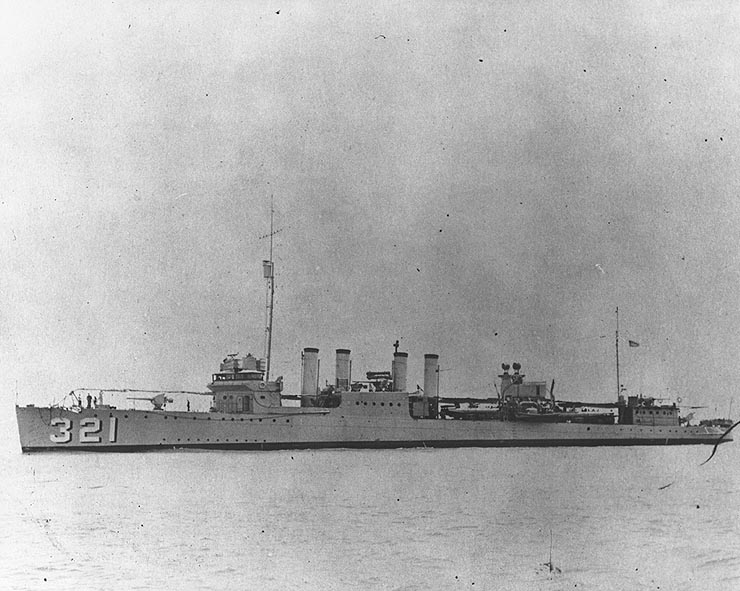
- USS Marcus

History

United States
- Namesake: Arnold Marcus
- Builder: Bethlehem Shipbuilding Corporation, Union Iron Works, San Francisco
- Laid down: 20 May 1919
- Launched: 22 August 1919
- Commissioned: 23 February 1921
- Decommissioned: 31 May 1930
- Stricken: 28 January 1935
- Fate: Sunk as target, 25 June 1935

General characteristics
- Class & type: Clemson-class destroyer
- Displacement: 1,290 long tons (1,311 t) (standard); 1,389 long tons (1,411 t) (deep load)
- Length: 314 ft 4 in (95.8 m)
- Beam: 30 ft 11 in (9.42 m)
- Draught: 10 ft 3 in (3.1 m)
- Installed power: 27,000 shp (20,000 kW); 4 water-tube boilers
- Propulsion: 2 shafts, 2 steam turbines
- Speed: 35 knots (65 km/h; 40 mph) (design)
- Range: 2,500 nautical miles (4,600 km; 2,900 mi) at 20 knots (37 km/h; 23 mph) (design)
- Complement: 6 officers, 108 enlisted men
- Armament: 4 × single 4-inch (102 mm) guns; 2 × single 1-pounder AA guns or; 2 × single 3-inch (76 mm) guns; 4 × triple 21 inch (533 mm) torpedo tubes; 2 × depth charge rails

USS Marcus (DD-321) was a Clemson-class destroyer built for the United States Navy after World War I.

== Namesake ==
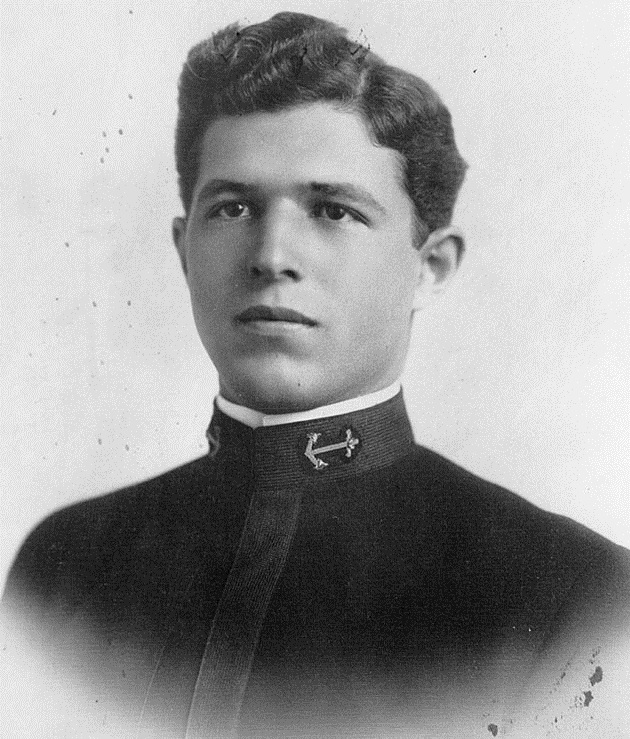
Arnold Marcus as a Midshipman

Arnold Marcus was born on 26 June 1892 in Atlantic City, New Jersey. He was appointed a midshipman on 22 May 1909. He assumed command of the submarine USS Shark on 13 March 1917. On 27 July 1917, Lieutenant (junior grade) Marcus died from injuries suffered during an explosion on Shark, while the submarine was on patrol in Manila Bay, Philippine Islands. He was the last man to leave the ship, remaining on board to ensure the safe evacuation of his crew and to attempt the grounding of his ship to prevent sinking.

== Description ==
The Clemson class was a repeat of the preceding Wickes class although more fuel capacity was added. The ships displaced 1,290 long tons (1,311 t) at standard load and 1,389 long tons (1,411 t) at deep load. They had an overall length of 314 feet 4 inches (95.8 m), a beam of 30 feet 11 inches (9.4 m) and a draught of 10 feet 3 inches (3.1 m). They had a crew of 6 officers and 108 enlisted men.

Performance differed radically between the ships of the class, often due to poor workmanship. The Clemson class was powered by two steam turbines, each driving one propeller shaft, using steam provided by four water-tube boilers. The turbines were designed to produce a total of 27,000 shaft horsepower (20,000 kW) intended to reach a speed of 35 knots (65 km/h; 40 mph). The ships carried a maximum of 371 long tons (377 t) of fuel oil which was intended gave them a range of 2,500 nautical miles (4,600 km; 2,900 mi) at 20 knots (37 km/h; 23 mph).

The ships were armed with four 4-inch (102 mm) guns in single mounts and were fitted with two 1-pounder guns for anti-aircraft defense. In many ships a shortage of 1-pounders caused them to be replaced by 3-inch (76 mm) guns. Their primary weapon, though, was their torpedo battery of a dozen 21 inch (533 mm) torpedo tubes in four triple mounts. They also carried a pair of depth charge rails. A "Y-gun" depth charge thrower was added to many ships.

== Construction and career ==
Marcus, named for Arnold Marcus, was laid down 20 May 1919 by the Bethlehem Shipbuilding Corporation, San Francisco, California; launched 22 August 1919; sponsored by Mrs. Arnold Marcus, widow of Lieutenant (jg.) Marcus; and commissioned 23 February 1921.

Marcus, after completion of her shakedown cruise, was assigned to destroyer squadron duty with the Pacific Fleet. As a unit of Squadron 13, and later Squadron 12, she operated off the West Coast, her cruises ranging from Seattle, Washington to Panama. In early 1924, February–March, she joined other ships of the battle force in fleet maneuvers based on a simulated attack on the Panama Canal. From April through July 1925, she participated in fleet tactical problems in the Hawaiian Islands area. She then returned to her regular operations schedule until 1927. During March and April of that year she again sailed south to take part in Caribbean fleet maneuvers, following which she returned to the West Coast. Between 1927 and 1929, she made several voyages to Honolulu; one, a Naval Reserve training cruise, two others as carrier screen.

In September 1929, Marcus was ordered to San Diego, California where she decommissioned 31 May 1930. Disposed of in accordance with the terms of the London Naval Treaty, she was struck from the Navy list 28 January 1935 and sunk by gunfire 25 June 1935.

As of 2005, no other ships in the United States Navy have been named Marcus.
