= Français-class submarine =

Class overview
- Name: Français class
- Builders: Arsenal de Cherbourg
- Operators: French Navy
- Preceded by: Farfadet class
- Succeeded by: Naïade class
- Built: 1899–1902
- In service: 1902–1914
- Completed: 2
- Scrapped: 2

General characteristics (as built)
- Type: Submarine
- Displacement: 147 t (145 long tons) (surfaced); 153 t (151 long tons) (submerged)
- Length: 36.78 m (120 ft 8 in) (o/a)
- Beam: 2.8 m (9 ft 2 in)
- Draft: 2.9 m (9 ft 6 in) (mean)
- Installed power: 300 CV (220 kW) (electric motors)
- Propulsion: 1 × shaft; 2 × electric motors
- Speed: 10.1 knots (18.7 km/h; 11.6 mph) (surfaced); 8.3 knots (15.4 km/h; 9.6 mph) (submerged)
- Range: 51 nmi (94 km; 59 mi) at 9.5 knots (17.6 km/h; 10.9 mph) (surfaced); 78 nmi (144 km; 90 mi) at 4.7 knots (8.7 km/h; 5.4 mph) (submerged)
- Complement: 13
- Armament: 1 × internal 450 mm (17.7 in) torpedo tube; 2 × external 450 mm (17.7 in) torpedo launchers

The Français class, also known as the Morse class, consisted of two submarines built for the French Navy during the first decade of the 20th century.

== Design and description ==
The two Français-class submarines were purchased by public subscription in 1899 that was organized by the newspaper Le Matin after the humiliation of the Fashoda Crisis in 1898. They were copies of the Morse, except built in steel rather than earlier boat's bronze alloy. The boats displaced 147 metric tons (145 long tons) on the surface and 153 metric tons (151 long tons) submerged. They had an overall length of 36.78 meters (120 ft 8 in), a beam of 2.75 meters (9 ft 0 in), and a draft of 2.9 meters (9 ft 6 in). The crew of all of the submarines numbered 2 officers and 11 enlisted men. The boats were powered by a pair of Sautter-Harlé electric motors designed to provide a total of 300 metric horsepower (296 bhp; 221 kW), both driving the single propeller shaft that was fitted with a variable-pitch propeller. They were designed to reach a maximum speed of 10.1 knots (18.7 km/h; 11.6 mph) on the surface and 8 knots (15 km/h; 9.2 mph) underwater. The Français class had a surface endurance of 51.5 nautical miles (95.4 km; 59.3 mi) at 9.5 knots (17.6 km/h; 10.9 mph) and a submerged endurance of 78 nmi (144 km; 90 mi) at 4.7 knots (8.7 km/h; 5.4 mph).

The boats were armed with 450-millimeter (17.7 in) torpedoes. They had an internal torpedo tube in the bow and two external torpedo launchers positioned on the hull forward of the conning tower.

== Ships ==
Ship	Laid down	Launched	Commissioned
Français (Q11)	about 1899	29 January 1901	1 June 1902
Algérien (Q12)	3 October 1899	25 April 1901	about 1902

== Bibliography ==
- Couhat, Jean Labayle (1974). French Warships of World War I. Ian Allan. ISBN 0-7110-0445-5.
- Garier, Gérard (1995). Du Plongeur (1863) aux Guêpe (1904) [From Plongeur (1863) to Guêpe (1904)]. L'odyssée technique et humaine du sous-marin en France (in French). Vol. 1. Marines édition. ISBN 2-909675-19-X.
- Garier, Gérard (2002). A l'épreuve de la Grande Guerre. L'odyssée technique et humaine du sous-marin en France (in French). Vol. 3–2. Marines édition. ISBN 2-909675-81-5.
- Roberts, Stephen S. (2021). French Warships in the Age of Steam 1859–1914: Design, Construction, Careers and Fates. Seaforth Publishing. ISBN 978-1-5267-4533-0.
- Roche, Jean-Michel (2005). Dictionnaire des bâtiments de la flotte de guerre française de Colbert à nos jours 2, 1870 - 2006. Roche. ISBN 978-2-9525917-0-6. OCLC 165892922.
- Smigielski, Adam (1985). "France". In Gray, Randal (ed.). Conway's All the World's Fighting Ships 1906–1921. Naval Institute Press. pp. 190–220. ISBN 0-87021-907-3.
