= SS Santhia =

Merchant steamship built in the UK in 1901

History
- Name: 1901: Santhia; 1923: Saka Maru
- Owner: 1901: British India SN Co; 1923: Saka Kisen KK
- Port of registry: 1901: (United Kingdom of Great Britain and Ireland) Glasgow; 1923: (Empire of Japan) Dairen
- Builder: William Denny & Bros, Dumbarton
- Cost: £89,420
- Yard number: 648
- Launched: 30 September 1901
- Completed: 7 November 1901
- Identification: UK official number 113988; 1901: code letters STWC; 1923: code letters QBST
- Fate: Scrapped 1935

General characteristics
- Class & type: "S" class cargo liner
- Tonnage: 5,151 GRT, 3,322 NRT, 8,139 DWT
- Length: 411.0 ft (125.3 m)
- Beam: 50.7 ft (15.5 m)
- Draught: 25 ft 2 in (7.67 m)
- Depth: 29.1 ft (8.9 m)
- Decks: 2
- Installed power: 383 NHP, 2,387 ihp
- Propulsion: 1 × triple-expansion engine; 1 × screw
- Speed: 12.3 knots (22.8 km/h)
- Capacity: passengers: 9 × 1st class, 16 × 2nd class, & 1,377 × emigrants or 2,204 × deck class
- Crew: 94

SS Santhia was a steam cargo liner that was launched in Scotland in 1901, renamed Saka Maru in 1923, and scrapped in Japan in 1935. She was one of a class of seven steamships that were built for the British India Steam Navigation Company (BI) in 1901 and 1902.

She was the first of three BI ships to be called Santhia. The second was a steamship that was launched in 1925, burnt out in 1943, and scrapped in 1945. The third was a motor ship that was launched in 1950 and scrapped in 1971.

== Building ==
In 1901 and 1902 BI took delivery of a class of seven new cargo liners. BI gave each ship a name beginning with "S", so they became known as the "S" class. William Denny and Brothers of Dumbarton in Scotland built four of them, including Santhia.

Denny built Santhia as yard number 648 for either £89,420 or £91,000 (sources differ). She was launched on 30 September 1901 and completed on 7 November. Her registered length was 411.0 ft (125.3 m), her beam was 50.7 ft (15.5 m), her depth was 29.1 ft (8.9 m) and her draught was 25 ft 2 in (7.67 m). Her tonnages were 5,151 GRT, 3,322 NRT, and 8,139 DWT.

She had berths for nine passengers in first class and 16 in second class. She could also carry unberthed passengers: either 1,377 emigrants, or 2,204 deck class passengers. She had a crew of 20 officers and 74 ratings.

She had a single screw, driven by a three-cylinder triple-expansion engine built by Denny. It was rated at 383 NHP or 2,387 ihp, and gave her a speed of 12.3 knots (22.8 km/h).

== Santhia ==
BI registered Santhia at Glasgow. Her United Kingdom official number was 113988 and her code letters were STWC.

At first she worked general cargo services, mainly between India and London. Her maiden voyage began from London on 13 December 1901. She sailed to Calcutta via Colombo in Ceylon and Madras (now Chennai).

In 1910 Santhia made two voyages taking indentured labourers from India to Fiji, as shown in the table below.

Fiji voyages
Voyage number	Date of Arrival in Fiji	Number of Passengers
I	22 April 1910	1021
II	8 July 1910	1030

On 26 June 1913, when approaching Calcutta from Singapore, Santhia grounded in the Hooghly River. On 31 March 1915, when approaching Calcutta from Rangoon (now Yangon), she grounded at Hooghly Point. From August 1917 until February 1919 Santhia was requisitioned under the UK's Liner Requisition Scheme.

== Saka Maru ==
On 26 September 1923 Saka Kisen KK bought Santhia for £14,300. She was renamed Saka Maru and registered at Dairen in the Kwantung Leased Territory. Her code letters were QBST. She was scrapped in Japan in 1934 or 1935.

== Bibliography ==
- Haws, Duncan (1987). British India S.N. Co. Merchant Fleets. Vol. 11. Burwash: Travel Creatours Ltd Publications. ISBN 0-946378-07-X.
- Laxon, WA; Perry, FW (1994). B.I. – The British India Steam Navigation Company Limited. Kendal: World Ship Society. ISBN 0-905617-65-7.
- Lloyd's Register of British and Foreign Shipping. Vol. I.–Steamers. London: Lloyd's Register of Shipping. 1902 – via Internet Archive.
- Lloyd's Register of Shipping. Vol. I.–Steamers and Motorships. London: Lloyd's Register of Shipping. 1926 – via Internet Archive.
- Mercantile Navy List. London. 1902 – via Crew List Index Project.
