= French submarine Français =

History

France
- Name: Français
- Ordered: 8 April 1899
- Laid down: about 1899
- Launched: 21 January 1901
- Commissioned: 1 June 1902
- Stricken: 21 May 1914
- Fate: Sold for scrap, 25 May 1921

General characteristics
- Class & type: Français-class submarine
- Displacement: 147 t (145 long tons) (surfaced); 153 t (151 long tons) (submerged)
- Length: 36.8 m (120 ft 9 in) (o/a)
- Beam: 2.8 m (9 ft 2 in)
- Draft: 2.8 m (9 ft 2 in) (mean)
- Installed power: 300 CV (220 kW) (electric motors)
- Propulsion: 1 × shaft; 2 × electric motors
- Speed: 10.1 knots (18.7 km/h; 11.6 mph) (surfaced); 8.3 knots (15.4 km/h; 9.6 mph) (submerged)
- Range: 51 nmi (94 km; 59 mi) at 9.5 knots (17.6 km/h; 10.9 mph) (surfaced); 78 nmi (144 km; 90 mi) at 4.7 knots (8.7 km/h; 5.4 mph) (submerged)
- Complement: 13
- Armament: 1 × internal 450 mm (17.7 in) torpedo tube; 2 × external 450 mm (17.7 in) torpedo launchers

Français (Q11) was one of two Français-class submarines built for the French Navy at the beginning of the 20th century.

== Design and description ==
The Français-class submarines were copies of the Morse, except built in steel rather than earlier boat's bronze alloy. The boats displaced 147 metric tons (145 long tons) on the surface and 153 metric tons (151 long tons) submerged. They had an overall length of 36.78 meters (120 ft 8 in), a beam of 2.75 meters (9 ft 0 in), and a draft of 2.9 meters (9 ft 6 in). The crew of the submarines numbered 2 officers and 11 enlisted men. The boats were powered by a pair of Sautter-Harlé electric motors designed to provide a total of 300 metric horsepower (296 bhp; 221 kW), both driving the single propeller shaft that was fitted with a variable-pitch propeller. They were designed to reach a maximum speed of 10.1 knots (18.7 km/h; 11.6 mph) on the surface and 8 knots (15 km/h; 9.2 mph) underwater. During her sea trials on 26 March 1901, Français reached a speed of 11.2 knots (20.7 km/h; 12.9 mph) on the surface from 307 PS (226 kW). The Français class had a surface endurance of 51.5 nautical miles (95.4 km; 59.3 mi) at 9.5 knots (17.6 km/h; 10.9 mph) and a submerged endurance of 78 nmi (144 km; 90 mi) at 4.7 knots (8.7 km/h; 5.4 mph).

The boats were armed with 450-millimeter (17.7 in) torpedoes. They had an internal torpedo tube in the bow and two external torpedo launchers positioned on the hull forward of the conning tower.

== Construction and career ==
Français was ordered on 8 April 1899 and was laid down later that year at the Arsenal de Cherbourg. She was launched on 29 January 1901 and was commissioned on 1 June 1902.

== Bibliography ==
- Garier, Gérard (1995). Du Plongeur (1863) aux Guêpe (1904) [From Plongeur (1863) to Guêpe (1904)]. L'odyssée technique et humaine du sous-marin en France (in French). Vol. 1. Marines édition. ISBN 2-909675-19-X.
- Roberts, Stephen S. (2021). French Warships in the Age of Steam 1859–1914: Design, Construction, Careers and Fates. Seaforth Publishing. ISBN 978-1-5267-4533-0.
