= USS Grampus (SS-4) =

Plunger-class submarine of the United States

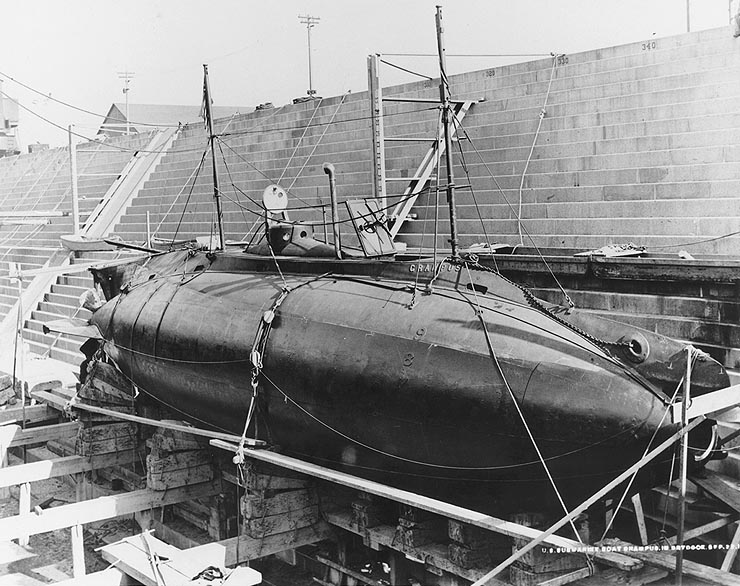
- USS Grampus in dry dock at Mare Island, 1906

History

United States
- Name: Grampus
- Namesake: Grampus griseus
- Builder: Union Iron Works, San Francisco, California
- Laid down: 10 December 1900
- Launched: 31 July 1902
- Sponsored by: Mrs. Marley F. Hay
- Commissioned: 28 May 1903
- Decommissioned: 28 November 1906
- Recommissioned: 13 June 1908
- Decommissioned: 28 June 1912
- Recommissioned: 17 April 1915
- Decommissioned: 25 July 1921
- Renamed: A-3 (Submarine Torpedo Boat No.3), 17 November 1911
- Stricken: 16 January 1922
- Identification: Hull symbol: SS-4 (17 July 1920); Call sign: NGL
- Fate: Dismantled and designated a target

General characteristics
- Class & type: Plunger-class submarine
- Displacement: 107 long tons (109 t) surfaced; 123 long tons (125 t) submerged
- Length: 63 ft 10 in (19.46 m)
- Beam: 11 ft 11 in (3.63 m)
- Draft: 10 ft 7 in (3.23 m)
- Installed power: 160 bhp (120 kW) surfaced; 150 bhp (110 kW) submerged
- Propulsion: 1 × Otto Gas Engine Works gas engine; 1 × Electro Dynamic electric motor; 60-cell battery; 1 × shaft
- Speed: 8 kn (15 km/h; 9.2 mph) surfaced; 7 kn (13 km/h; 8.1 mph) submerged
- Test depth: 150 ft (46 m)
- Complement: 1 officer; 6 enlisted
- Armament: 1 × 17.7 in (450 mm) "18-in" torpedo tube (5 torpedoes)

USS Grampus/A-3 (SS-4), also known as Submarine Torpedo Boat No. 4 and later renamed A-3, was a Plunger-class submarine, and the fourth ship of the United States Navy to be named for a member of the dolphin family, Grampus griseus. She was stationed on the West Coast, assisting in the relief efforts after the San Francisco earthquake of 1906, and was later transported to the Philippines, serving as harbor defense during World War I.

== Design ==
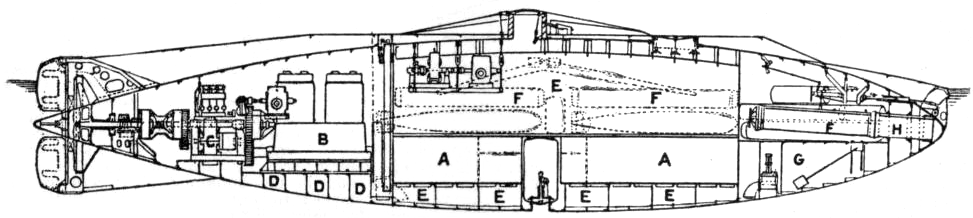
Plan of Plunger-class. A, storage batteries; B, gas-engine; C, dynamo and motor; D, water-tight compartments; E, main ballast tanks; F, air-flasks; G, gasolene tank; H, expulsion tube.

The Plunger-class submarines were enlarged and improved versions of the preceding Holland, the first submarine in the USN. They had a length of 63 ft 10 in (19.5 m) overall, a beam of 11 ft 11 in (3.6 m) and a mean draft of 10 ft 7 in (3.2 m). They displaced 107 long tons (109 t) on the surface and 123 long tons (125 t) submerged. The Plunger-class boats had a crew of one officer and six enlisted men. They had a diving depth of 150 feet (45.7 m).

For surface running, they were powered by one 180-brake-horsepower (134 kW) gasoline engine that drove the single propeller. When submerged the propeller was driven by a 70-horsepower (52 kW) electric motor. The boats could reach 8 kn (15 km/h; 9.2 mph) on the surface and 7 kn (13 km/h; 8.1 mph) underwater.

The Plunger-class boats were armed with one 18-inch (457 mm) torpedo tube in the bow. They carried four reloads, for a total of five torpedoes.

== Construction ==
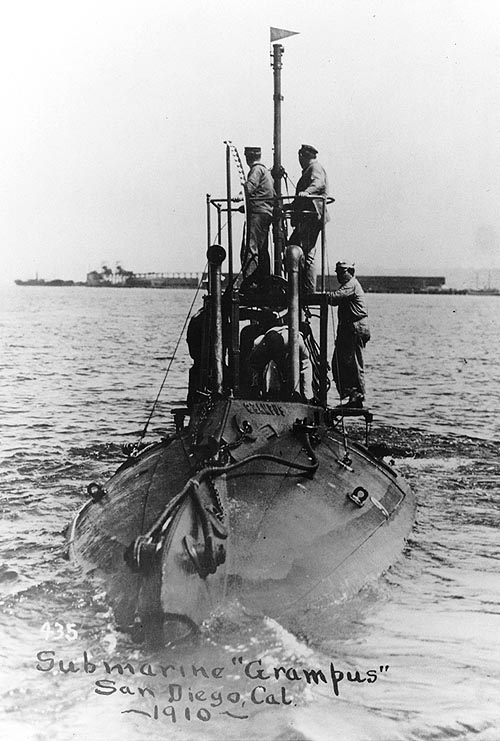
Bow view of Grampus, in San Diego, 1910

Grampus' keel was laid down on 10 December 1900, in San Francisco, California, by the Union Iron Works, a subcontractor for the Holland Torpedo Boat Company, of New York City. She was launched on 31 July 1902; sponsored by Mrs. Marley F. Hay, the wife of the Superintendent of Construction at Union Iron Works; commissioned at the Mare Island Navy Yard on 28 May 1903.

Her christening was marred by a failure of the ribbon from which the champagne was hung, leading some sailors to believe she was cursed.

== Service history ==
Over the next three and a half years, Grampus operated out of the San Francisco area, principally in training and experimental work. On 18 April 1906, men from her crew participated in relief efforts after the devastating San Francisco earthquake of 1906. Decommissioned, for the first time, at Mare Island, on 28 November 1906, Grampus remained inactive until recommissioned on 13 June 1908. Subsequently assigned to the First Submarine Division, Pacific Torpedo Flotilla, in January 1910, and to the Pacific Fleet, in March 1911, the submarine torpedo boat operated locally off the California coast until assigned to the Pacific Reserve Fleet on 28 June 1912. Toward the end of that period of active service, on 17 November 1911, Grampus was renamed A-3.

A-3 remained inactive, at the Puget Sound Navy Yard into 1915. On 16 February 1915, she was hoisted onto the collier Hector, which sailed soon thereafter for the Philippines with A-3 and her sister ship, A-5, ex-Pike, as deck cargo. Hector arrived at Olongapo, site of the Subic Bay Naval Base, on 26 March, and returned A-3 to the water 10 April 1915.

Recommissioned at Olongapo, a week later, on 17 April 1915, A-3 was assigned to the First Submarine Division, Torpedo Flotilla, Asiatic Fleet, and remained in active service with that unit until decommissioned at Cavite, on 25 July 1921. During World War I, A-3 patrolled the waters off the entrance to Manila Bay. On 17 July 1920, A-3 was given the hull number SS-4.

== Fate ==
A-3 was dismantled and used as a target by ships of the Asiatic Fleet, she was stricken from the Naval Vessel Register on 16 January 1922.

== Bibliography ==
- Mohl, Michael. "Grampus / A-3 (SS-4)". Navsource.net.
- "A-3 (Submarine Torpedo Boat No. 4)". Dictionary of American Naval Fighting Ships. Navy Department, Naval History and Heritage Command. 31 August 2016. This article incorporates text from this source, which is in the public domain.
- "Red Light Shows the Grampus Her Way to Waters of the Bay". Vol. XCII, no. 62. San Francisco Call. 1 August 1902. p. 10.
- Friedman, Norman (1995). U.S. Submarines Through 1945: An Illustrated Design History. Annapolis, Maryland: Naval Institute Press. ISBN 1-55750-263-3.
- Gardiner, Robert & Gray, Randal, eds. (1985). Conway's All the World's Fighting Ships 1906–1921. Annapolis, Maryland: Naval Institute Press. ISBN 0-85177-245-5.
