= USS Pike (SS-6) =

Plunger-class submarine of the United States

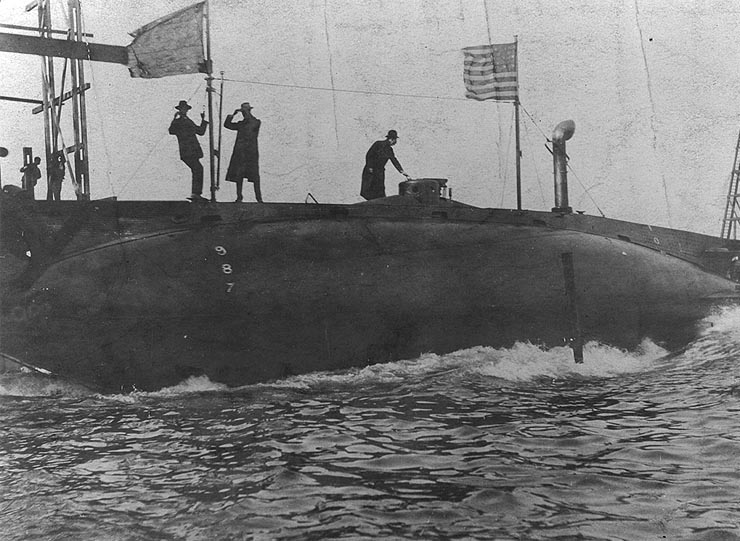
- USS Pike, being launched at the Union Iron Works, San Francisco, California, on 14 January 1903

History

United States
- Name: Pike
- Namesake: The pike
- Builder: Union Iron Works, San Francisco, California
- Laid down: 10 December 1900
- Launched: 14 January 1903
- Commissioned: 28 May 1903
- Decommissioned: 28 November 1906
- Recommissioned: 8 June 1908
- Decommissioned: 28 June 1912
- Recommissioned: 17 April 1915
- Decommissioned: 25 July 1921
- Renamed: A-5 (Submarine Torpedo Boat No.6), 17 November 1911
- Stricken: 16 January 1922
- Identification: Hull symbol: SS-6 (17 July 1920); Call sign: NQC
- Fate: Designated as a target

General characteristics
- Class & type: Plunger-class submarine
- Displacement: 107 long tons (109 t) surfaced; 123 long tons (125 t) submerged
- Length: 63 ft 10 in (19.46 m)
- Beam: 11 ft 11 in (3.63 m)
- Draft: 10 ft 7 in (3.23 m)
- Installed power: 160 bhp (120 kW) surfaced; 150 bhp (110 kW) submerged
- Propulsion: 1 × Otto Gas Engine Works gas engine; 1 × Electro Dynamic electric motor; 60-cell battery; 1 × shaft
- Speed: 8 kn (15 km/h; 9.2 mph) surfaced; 7 kn (13 km/h; 8.1 mph) submerged
- Test depth: 150 ft (46 m)
- Complement: 1 officer; 6 enlisted
- Armament: 1 × 17.7 in (450 mm) "18-in" torpedo tube (5 torpedoes)

The first USS Pike/A-5 (SS-6) also known as "Submarine Torpedo Boat No. 6", was one of seven Plunger-class submarines built for the United States Navy (USN) in the first decade of the 20th century. She was the first boat of the USN named for the pike. She was stationed on the West Coast, assisting in the relief efforts after the San Francisco earthquake of 1906, and was later transported to the Philippines, serving as harbor defense during WWI.

== Design ==
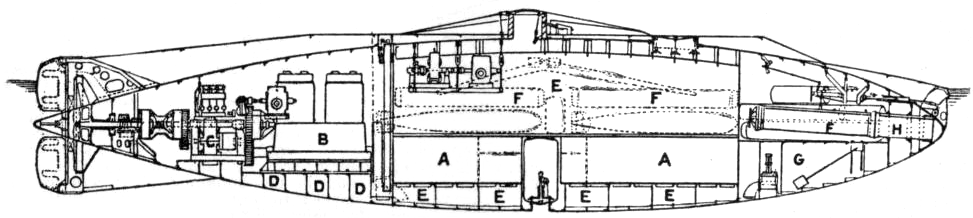
Plan of Plunger-class. A, storage batteries; B, gas-engine; C, dynamo and motor; D, water-tight compartments; E, main ballast tanks; F, air-flasks; G, gasolene tank; H, expulsion tube.

The Plunger-class submarines were enlarged and improved versions of the preceding Holland, the first submarine in the USN. They had a length of 63 ft 10 in (19.5 m) overall, a beam of 11 ft 11 in (3.6 m) and a mean draft of 10 ft 7 in (3.2 m). They displaced 107 long tons (109 t) on the surface and 123 long tons (125 t) submerged. The Plunger-class boats had a crew of one officer and six enlisted men. They had a diving depth of 150 feet (45.7 m).

For surface running, they were powered by one 180-brake-horsepower (134 kW) gasoline engine that drove the single propeller. When submerged the propeller was driven by a 70-horsepower (52 kW) electric motor. The boats could reach 8 kn (15 km/h; 9.2 mph) on the surface and 7 kn (13 km/h; 8.1 mph) underwater.

The Plunger-class boats were armed with one 18-inch (457 mm) torpedo tube in the bow. They carried four reloads, for a total of five torpedoes.

== Construction ==
Pike was laid down on 10 December 1900, in San Francisco, California, by the Union Iron Works, a subcontractor for the Holland Torpedo Boat Company, of New York City. She was launched on 14 January 1903; sponsored by Mrs. Frank Baker Zahm, the wife of the naval constructor at Union Iron Works; and commissioned on 28 May 1903 at the Mare Island Navy Yard.

== Service history ==
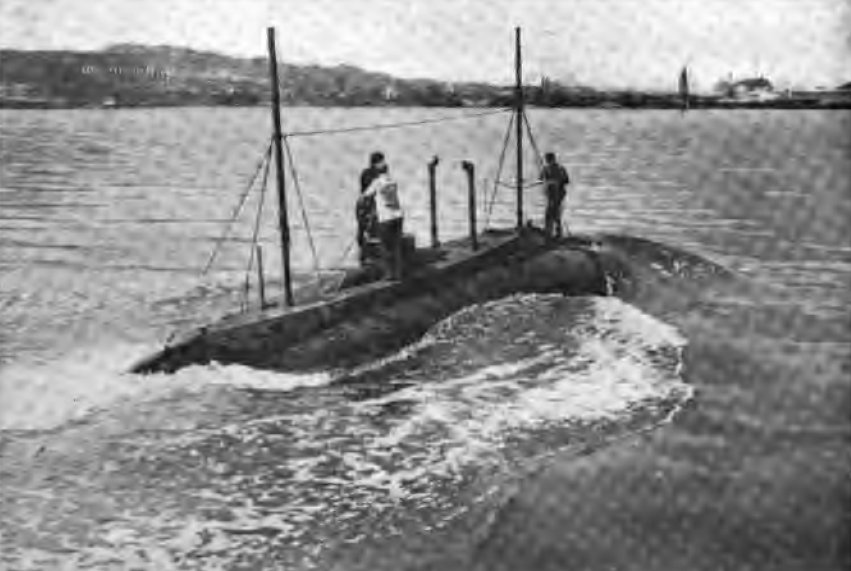
Pike underway

Pike operated out of the Mare Island Navy Yard, for over three years, operating principally in experimental and training roles. Following the earthquake and subsequent fire at San Francisco, on 18 April 1906, members of Pike's crew took part in the relief efforts in the wake of the disaster.

Decommissioned on 28 November 1906, Pike remained inactive until 8 June 1908, when she was recommissioned for local operations with the Pacific Torpedo Flotilla, off the Pacific coast. She remained attached to this unit into June 1912. Pike was renamed A-5, on 17 November 1911.

A-5 arrived at the Puget Sound Navy Yard, on 26 June 1912, and was placed in reserve two days later. Following two and a half years of inactivity there, A-5 was loaded onto the collier Hector, on 15 February 1915, her sister ship A-3, ex-Grampus, was loaded the next day. A-5 made the voyage to the Philippines as deck cargo. She arrived at Olongapo, on 26 March. Relaunched on 13 April, she was recommissioned on 17 April 1915, and assigned to the Asiatic Fleet.

Shortly after the United States entered World War I, A-5 sank while moored at the Cavite Navy Yard, on 15 April 1917; her sinking was attributed to a slow leak in a main ballast tank. She was raised on 19 April, and following reconditioning, returned to active service. Like her sister ships, she patrolled the waters off the entrance to Manila Bay, during the course of the war with the Central Powers.

== Fate ==
A-5, was given the alphanumeric hull number SS-6 on 17 July 1920. She was decommissioned on 25 July 1921. Earmarked as a target vessel, she was struck from the Naval Vessel Register on 16 January 1922.

== Bibliography ==
- Mohl, Michael. "Pike / A-5 (SS-6)". Navsource.net.
- Cressman, Robert J. (4 August 2022). "A-5 (Submarine Torpedo Boat No. 6)". Dictionary of American Naval Fighting Ships. Navy Department, Naval History and Heritage Command. This article incorporates text from this source, which is in the public domain.
- Friedman, Norman (1995). U.S. Submarines Through 1945: An Illustrated Design History. Annapolis, Maryland: Naval Institute Press. ISBN 1-55750-263-3.
- Gardiner, Robert & Gray, Randal, eds. (1985). Conway's All the World's Fighting Ships 1906–1921. Annapolis, Maryland: Naval Institute Press. ISBN 0-85177-245-5.
