= USS Porpoise (SS-7) =

Plunger-class submarine of the United States

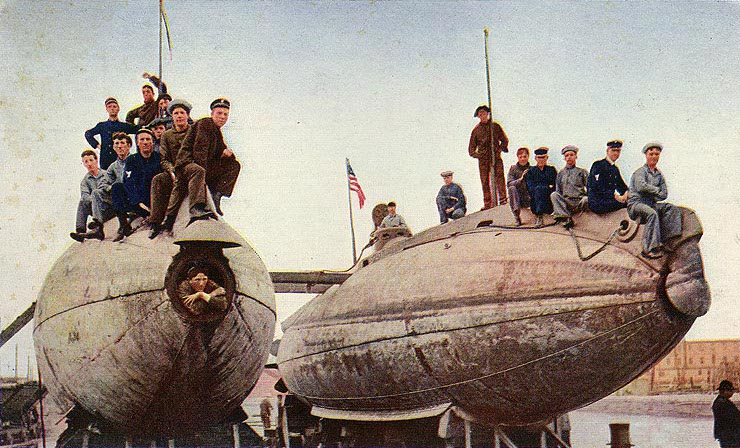
- Postcard of USS Porpoise (right) and sister ship USS Shark, at New York, 1905

History

United States
- Name: Porpoise
- Namesake: The porpoise
- Builder: Crescent Shipyard, Elizabethport, New Jersey
- Laid down: 13 December 1900
- Launched: 23 September 1901
- Commissioned: 19 September 1903
- Decommissioned: 21 April 1907
- Recommissioned: 20 November 1908
- Decommissioned: 12 December 1919
- Renamed: A-6 (Submarine Torpedo Boat No.7), 17 November 1911
- Stricken: 16 January 1922
- Identification: Hull symbol: SS-7 (17 July 1920); Call sign: NKH

General characteristics
- Class & type: Plunger-class submarine
- Displacement: 107 long tons (109 t) surfaced; 123 long tons (125 t) submerged
- Length: 63 ft 10 in (19.46 m)
- Beam: 11 ft 11 in (3.63 m)
- Draft: 10 ft 7 in (3.23 m)
- Installed power: 160 bhp (120 kW) surfaced; 150 bhp (110 kW) submerged
- Propulsion: 1 × Otto Gas Engine Works gas engine; 1 × Electro Dynamic electric motor; 60-cell battery; 1 × shaft
- Speed: 8 kn (15 km/h; 9.2 mph) surfaced; 7 kn (13 km/h; 8.1 mph) submerged
- Test depth: 150 ft (46 m)
- Complement: 1 officer; 6 enlisted
- Armament: 1 × 17.7 in (450 mm) "18-in" torpedo tube (5 torpedoes)

USS Porpoise/A-6 (SS-7), also known as "Submarine Torpedo Boat No. 7", was one of seven Plunger-class submarines built for the United States Navy (USN) in the first decade of the 20th century. She was the third boat in the USN named for the porpoise. Used primarily for training, she was partially disassembled and transported to the Philippines, in 1908. During WWI she was used for harbor defense in Manila Bay.

== Design ==
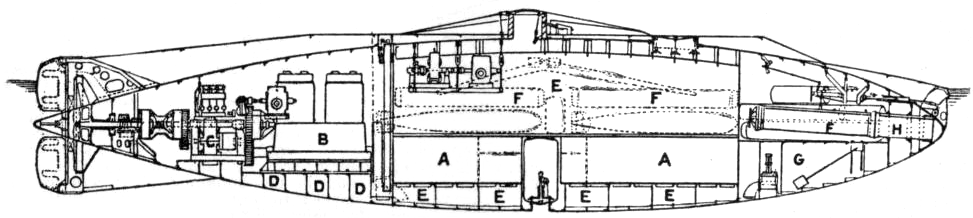
Plan of Plunger-class. A, storage batteries; B, gas-engine; C, dynamo and motor; D, water-tight compartments; E, main ballast tanks; F, air-flasks; G, gasolene tank; H, expulsion tube.

The Plunger-class submarines were enlarged and improved versions of the preceding Holland, the first submarine in the USN. They had a length of 63 ft 10 in (19.5 m) overall, a beam of 11 ft 11 in (3.6 m) and a mean draft of 10 ft 7 in (3.2 m). They displaced 107 long tons (109 t) on the surface and 123 long tons (125 t) submerged. The Plunger-class boats had a crew of one officer and six enlisted men. They had a diving depth of 150 feet (45.7 m).

For surface running, they were powered by one 180-brake-horsepower (134 kW) gasoline engine that drove the single propeller. When submerged the propeller was driven by a 70-horsepower (52 kW) electric motor. The boats could reach 8 kn (15 km/h; 9.2 mph) on the surface and 7 kn (13 km/h; 8.1 mph) underwater.

The Plunger-class boats were armed with one 18-inch (457 mm) torpedo tube in the bow. They carried four reloads, for a total of five torpedoes.

== Construction ==
Porpoise was laid down on 13 December 1900, in Elizabethport, New Jersey, at the Crescent Shipyard, by Lewis Nixon, a subcontractor for the Holland Torpedo Boat Company, New York City; launched on 23 September 1901; sponsored Mrs. E.B. Frost, the wife of E.B. Frost of Crescent Shipyard; and commissioned at the Holland Torpedo Boatyard at New Suffolk, New York on 19 September 1903.

== Service history ==
Assigned initially to the Naval Torpedo Station, at Newport, Rhode Island, for experimental torpedo firing work, Porpoise entered the New York Navy Yard, in September 1904, for repairs and alterations, remaining there until February 1906. Assigned then to the First Torpedo Flotilla, on 7 March 1907, she operated at Annapolis, Maryland, temporarily assigned to the United States Naval Academy, for instruction of future naval officers, until June 1907. Taken subsequently to the New York Navy Yard, she was decommissioned on 21 April 1908. Partially disassembled, she was then loaded onto the after well deck of the collier Caesar, for a voyage to the Philippines, as deck cargo along with her sister ship Shark via the Suez Canal.

Arriving at the Naval Station at Cavite, Porpoise was relaunched on 8 July 1908, and recommissioned on 20 November 1908. Due to the small size of Plunger-class boats, officers and men lived on board the gunboat Elcano.

=== Whiting's experiment ===
In April 1909, Ensign Kenneth Whiting, a future naval aviation pioneer, became the commanding officer of Porpoise. On 15 April, Whiting and his crew of six took the submarine out for what was to be a routine run. Porpoise got underway, cleared the dock and moved out into Manila Bay. She dove soon thereafter, and leveled off at a depth of 20 ft (6.1 m). Only then did Whiting reveal the purpose of the dive.

Convinced that a man could escape from a submarine through the torpedo tube, Whiting determined that he was going to try and test his theory with himself as a guinea pig. Squeezing into the 18-inch diameter tube, he clung to the crossbar which stiffened the outer torpedo tube door, as the crew closed the inner door. When the outer door was opened and water rushed in, Whiting hung onto the crossbar that drew his elbows out of the tube's mouth, and then muscled his way out using his hands and arms, the entire evolution consuming 77 seconds. He then swam to the surface, Porpoise surfacing soon thereafter. Reluctant to speak about the incident in public, he nevertheless informed his flotilla commander, Lieutenant Guy W.S. Castle, who submitted a report on how the feat had been accomplished. In Porpoise's log that day, Whiting had simply commented: "Whiting went through the torpedo tube, boat lying in (the) water in (a) normal condition, as an experiment..."

=== Asiatic fleet and WWI service ===
Subsequently, becoming a unit of the First Submarine Division, Asiatic Torpedo Fleet, United States Asiatic Fleet, on 9 December 1909, Porpoise continued her routine of local operations out of Cavite, for the next decade. Renamed A-6, on 17 November 1911, she patrolled the entrance to Manila Bay, and convoyed vessels out of port during World War I.

== Fate ==
Placed in ordinary, on 1 December 1918, she spent a little over a year in that status, until decommissioned, on 12 December 1919, and turned over to the Commandant of the Naval Station, at Cavite, for disposal. Given the alphanumeric hull number SS-7 on 17 July 1920, A-6 was authorized for use as a target in July 1921, and as of 16 January 1922, was struck from the Naval Vessel Register.

== Bibliography ==
- Mohl, Michael. "Porpoise / A-6 (SS-7)". Navsource.net.
- "A-6 (Submarine Torpedo Boat No. 7)". Dictionary of American Naval Fighting Ships. Navy Department, Naval History and Heritage Command. 31 August 2016. This article incorporates text from this source, which is in the public domain.
- Friedman, Norman (1995). U.S. Submarines Through 1945: An Illustrated Design History. Annapolis, Maryland: Naval Institute Press. ISBN 1-55750-263-3.
- Gardiner, Robert & Gray, Randal, eds. (1985). Conway's All the World's Fighting Ships 1906–1921. Annapolis, Maryland: Naval Institute Press. ISBN 0-85177-245-5.
