= USS Shark (SS-8) =

Plunger-class submarine of the United States

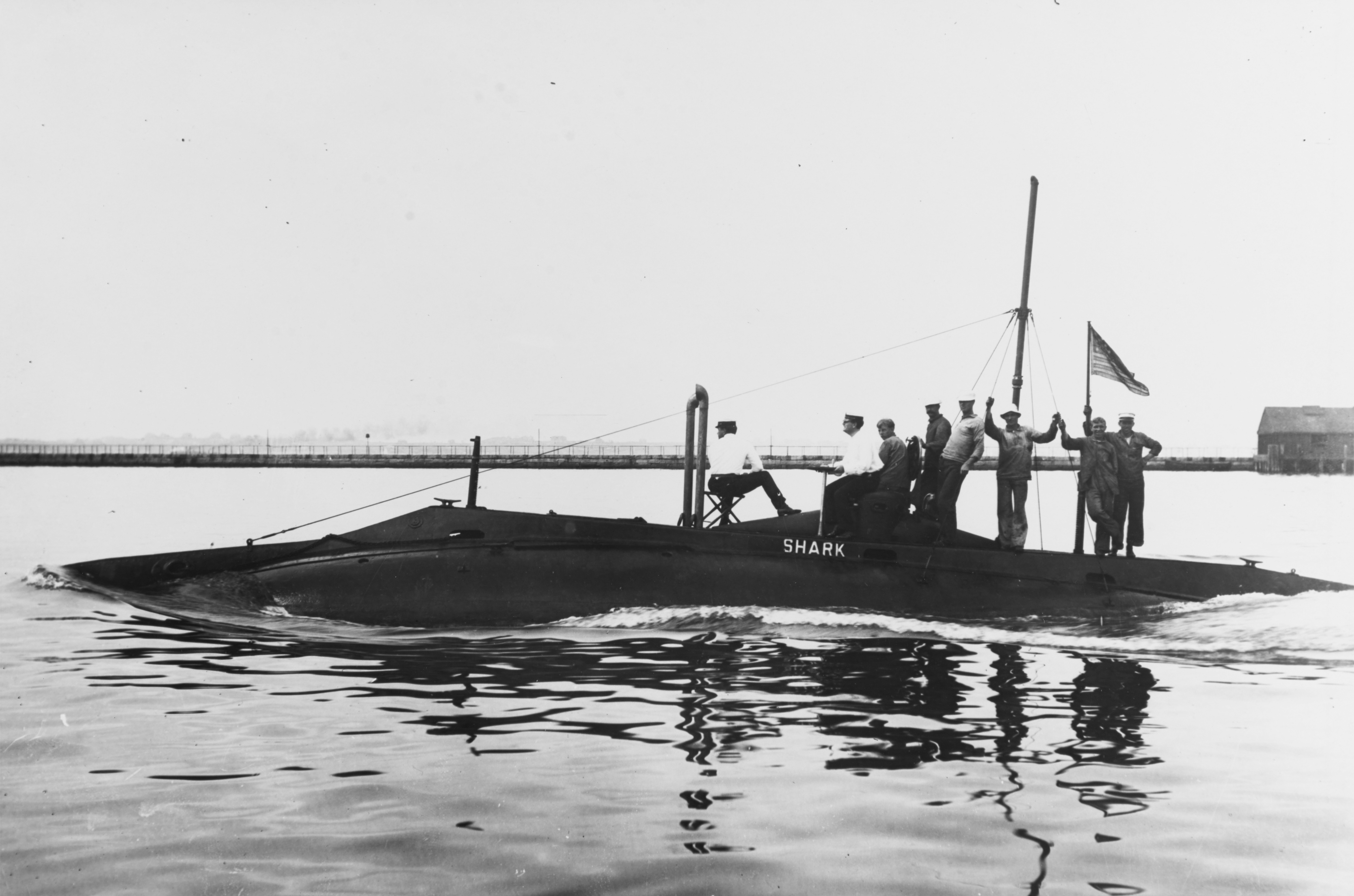
- USS Shark underway, c. 1903–1907

History

United States
- Name: Shark
- Namesake: The shark
- Builder: Crescent Shipyard, Elizabethport, New Jersey
- Laid down: 11 January 1901
- Launched: 19 October 1901
- Commissioned: 19 September 1903
- Decommissioned: 21 April 1908
- Recommissioned: 14 August 1909
- Decommissioned: 12 December 1919
- Renamed: A-7 (Submarine Torpedo Boat No.8), 17 November 1911
- Stricken: 16 January 1922
- Identification: Hull symbol: SS-8 (17 July 1920); Call sign: NSK

General characteristics
- Class & type: Plunger-class submarine
- Displacement: 107 long tons (109 t) surfaced; 123 long tons (125 t) submerged
- Length: 63 ft 10 in (19.46 m)
- Beam: 11 ft 11 in (3.63 m)
- Draft: 10 ft 7 in (3.23 m)
- Installed power: 160 bhp (120 kW) surfaced; 150 bhp (110 kW) submerged
- Propulsion: 1 × Otto Gas Engine Works gas engine; 1 × Electro Dynamic electric motor; 60-cell battery; 1 × shaft
- Speed: 8 kn (15 km/h; 9.2 mph) surfaced; 7 kn (13 km/h; 8.1 mph) submerged
- Test depth: 150 ft (46 m)
- Complement: 1 officer; 6 enlisted
- Armament: 1 × 17.7 in (450 mm) "18-in" torpedo tube (5 torpedoes)

USS Shark/A-7 (SS-8), also known as "Submarine Torpedo Boat No. 8", was one of seven Plunger-class submarines built for the United States Navy (USN) in the first decade of the 20th century. She was the third boat of the USN to be named for the shark. Used primarily for training, she was transported to the Philippines, in 1908. During WWI she served as harbor defense in Manila Bay.

== Design ==
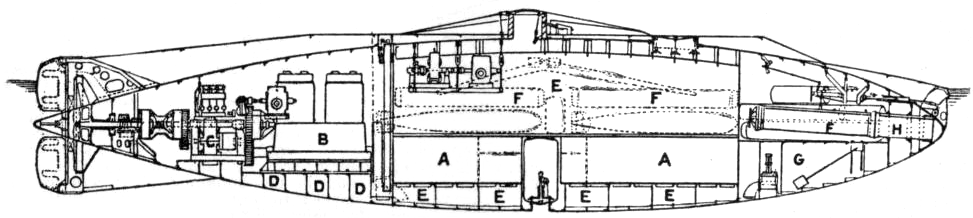
Plan of Plunger-class. A, storage batteries; B, gas-engine; C, dynamo and motor; D, water-tight compartments; E, main ballast tanks; F, air-flasks; G, gasolene tank; H, expulsion tube.

The Plunger-class submarines were enlarged and improved versions of the preceding Holland, the first submarine in the USN. They had a length of 63 ft 10 in (19.5 m) overall, a beam of 11 ft 11 in (3.6 m) and a mean draft of 10 ft 7 in (3.2 m). They displaced 107 long tons (109 t) on the surface and 123 long tons (125 t) submerged. The Plunger-class boats had a crew of one officer and six enlisted men. They had a diving depth of 150 feet (45.7 m).

For surface running, they were powered by one 180-brake-horsepower (134 kW) gasoline engine that drove the single propeller. When submerged the propeller was driven by a 70-horsepower (52 kW) electric motor. The boats could reach 8 kn (15 km/h; 9.2 mph) on the surface and 7 kn (13 km/h; 8.1 mph) underwater.

The Plunger-class boats were armed with one 18-inch (457 mm) torpedo tube in the bow. They carried four reloads, for a total of five torpedoes.

== Construction ==
Shark was laid down on 11 January 1901, in Elizabethport, New Jersey, at the Crescent Shipyard, by Lewis Nixon, a subcontractor for the Holland Torpedo Boat Company, New York City; launched on 19 October 1901; sponsored Mrs. Walter Stevens Turpin, wife of an officer on duty at Crescent Shipyard; and commissioned at the Holland Torpedo Boatyard at New Suffolk, New York on 19 September 1903.

== Service history ==
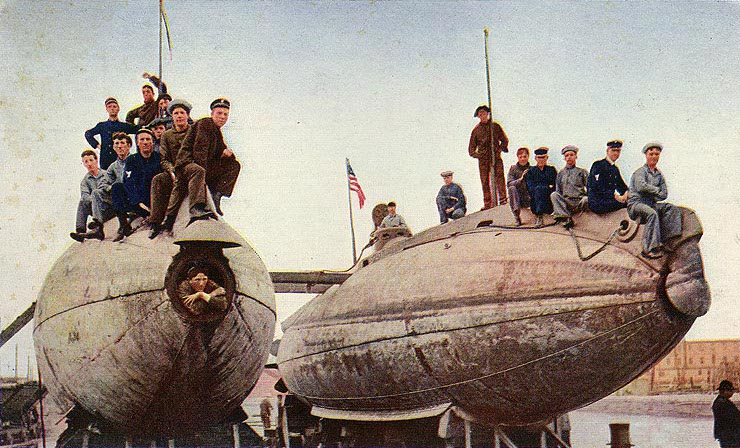
Postcard of Porpoise (right) and sister ship Shark, at New York, 1905

Over the next three and a half years, Shark operated locally at the Naval Torpedo Station, in Newport, Rhode Island, conducting firing tests with torpedoes and participating in early research and development efforts in the field of undersea warfare. Assigned to the First Submarine Flotilla, in March 1907, Shark was stationed at the United States Naval Academy, at Annapolis, Maryland, in the spring of 1907.

In April 1908, Shark was taken to the New York Navy Yard, and decommissioned there on 21 April. Loaded onto the collier Caesar, Shark and her sister ship Porpoise, comprised the auxiliary's deck cargo as she proceeded, via the Suez Canal, to the Philippines. Shark was relaunched soon after her arrival at the Naval Station at Cavite, in July, and was recommissioned on 14 August 1908.

=== Asiatic Fleet and WWI ===
Over the next several years, the submarine torpedo boat operated out of Cavite, interspersing training with periodic upkeep and repair work. On 17 November 1911, Shark was officially renamed A-7.

During World War I, A-7 and her sister ships, were based at Cavite, and carried out patrols of the entrance to Manila Bay.

==== Engine explosion ====
In the early spring of 1917, Lieutenant (jg) Arnold Marcus assumed command of A-7. On 24 July 1917, shortly after her engine had been overhauled, gasoline fumes ignited, causing an explosion and fire while in the course of a patrol in Manila Bay. After Lieutenant Marcus and his men battled the blaze, he ordered the crew topside and into the boats that had been summoned alongside. As the last man to emerge from the interior of the crippled submersible, Marcus sent up distress signals to the nearby monitor Monadnock, then took the helm himself in an attempt to beach the ship. He refused medical treatment until all his men had been attended to and had to be ordered to leave his post. Marcus and six of his crew died the next day, 25 July 1917, from the effects of the explosion and fire that had ravaged A-7. The last remaining member of the crew, Fireman Second Class Arthur M. Jacobs, succumbed to his injuries on 1 August 1917. The Navy recognized Marcus' heroism by naming the destroyer Marcus (DD-321), in his honor.

== Fate ==
Placed in ordinary at Cavite, on 1 April 1918, A-7 was officially decommissioned on 12 December 1919. She was given the alphanumeric hull number SS-8 on 17 July 1920. A-7 was initially advertised for sale in the 16th Naval District. She was subsequently authorized for use as a target in 1921, and struck from the Naval Vessel Register on 16 January 1922.

== Bibliography ==
- Mohl, Michael. "Shark / A-7 (SS-8)". Navsource.net.
- "A-7 (Submarine Torpedo Boat No. 8)". Dictionary of American Naval Fighting Ships. Navy Department, Naval History and Heritage Command. 20 August 2024. This article incorporates text from this source, which is in the public domain.
- Friedman, Norman (1995). U.S. Submarines Through 1945: An Illustrated Design History. Annapolis, Maryland: Naval Institute Press. ISBN 1-55750-263-3.
- Gardiner, Robert & Gray, Randal, eds. (1985). Conway's All the World's Fighting Ships 1906–1921. Annapolis, Maryland: Naval Institute Press. ISBN 0-85177-245-5.
