= Crescent Shipyard =

New Jersey American shipyard company

Coordinates: 40°38′42.06″N 74°11′18.66″W

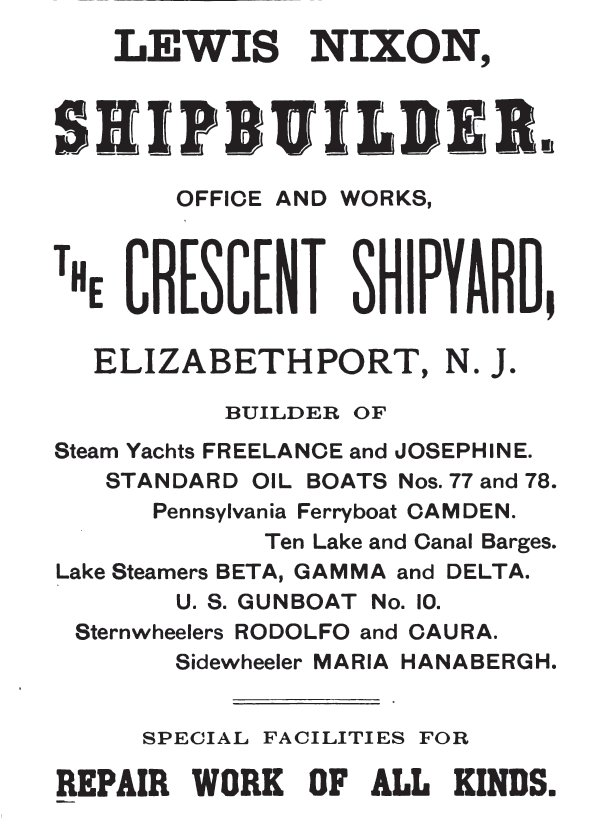
An 1899 advertisement for the Crescent Shipyard

Crescent Shipyard, located on Newark Bay in Elizabeth, New Jersey, built a number of ships for the United States Navy and allied nations as well during their production run, which lasted about ten years while under the Crescent name and banner. Production of these ships began before the Spanish–American War and occurred far before the outbreak of World War I. Arthur Leopold Busch, a recent emigre from Great Britain, started the yard with former Navy Lt. Lewis Nixon in January 1895. Both men previously worked for William Cramp & Sons in Philadelphia. Both Nixon and Busch were regarded to be amongst the best in their respected fields - and what they did at this time - as designers and builders of the latest, most advanced types of ships.

Nixon, a cofounder of Crescent Shipyard was also the lead designer of America's first class of battleships at William Cramp & Sons Shipyard, in Philadelphia. He also built the Anstice yacht (1902) that was renamed the Sandy Hook.

Isaac Rice's Electric Launch Company, which was started to build electrically propelled launches and small craft, also began its operations here..

The Crescent Shipyard was operated by Nixon until 1904. In 1904 Crescent Shipyard was acquired by Bethlehem Steel. Bethlehem Steel leased the yard to John W. Sullivan and part to New Jersey Dry Dock & Transportation Company. In 1916, Bethlehem Steel took over operation of the shipyard. The yard was closed permanently shortly after the conclusion of World War I in 1921.

== Submarine works ==
Busch, as this shipyard's superintendent, supervised several classes of naval ships, including gunboats, monitors, and cruisers in addition to the first commissioned submarine of the United States Navy, USS Holland (SS-1). The Holland is considered technologically revolutionary in several respects. This submarine was considered a historic first, and revolutionary in a timeline of naval innovations in world history. Internationally, many "advanced" industrialized nations around the world took note – almost immediately – and some acquired the rights to build them soon after the purchase of the Holland VI on 11 April 1900.

Busch, as shipyard construction chief and naval architect for Lewis Nixon, went on to supervise the building of the prototype "Fulton", which followed the USS Holland and was used as an example and template in development of America's A-class or Adder-class submarines. Busch reviewed the engineering plans of Fulton with Holland, who approved the works of Busch. These pioneering submarines were built for the Holland Torpedo Boat Company named after this company's founder John Philip Holland. Work on these submarines began at this shipyard in the late fall of 1896 with the keel to the Holland VI being laid down by early December of that year.

Holland's company evolved into the Electric Boat Company after this company was officially incorporated on 7 February 1899. Japan's first five submarines were developed under Busch's direction while working at Fore River Ship and Engine Company in Quincy, Massachutsetts for Electric Boat and Admiral Francis T. Bowles, President of the shipyard in 1904. Electric Boat had subcontracted with the Fore River Shipbuilding yard for some twenty years (since this time) before moving to their present location in Groton, CT.

== Bethlehem Elizabethport ==
Bethlehem Elizabethport built United States Shipping Board cargo Ships, tugboats, reefer ships, tanker ships starting in 1918 for World War I. The ships were part of the Emergency Fleet Corporation program.

The site of the shipyard at Front and Marshall Streets is now Veterans Memorial Waterfront Park.

== John W. Sullivan Company ==
John W. Sullivan Company from 1914 to 1926 built: cargo ships. tungboats, minesweepers, Ferry ships, tankers, fireboats and salvage ship.

== New Jersey Dry Dock & Transportation Company ==
The New Jersey Dry Dock & Transportation Company from 1914 to 1916 built: tugs, a cutter, Fire Boat and a barge.

== Samuel L Moore & Company ==
Samuel L Moore & Company built from 1890 to 1893 tug, gunboat, ferry, lighthouse tender and yacht.

== See also ==
- Calmar Steamship Company and other subsidiaries of the Bethlehem Steel
