= Ottomobile =

Defunct motor vehicle manufacturers of the United States

Otto Gas Engine Works Otto Motor Car Sales Company
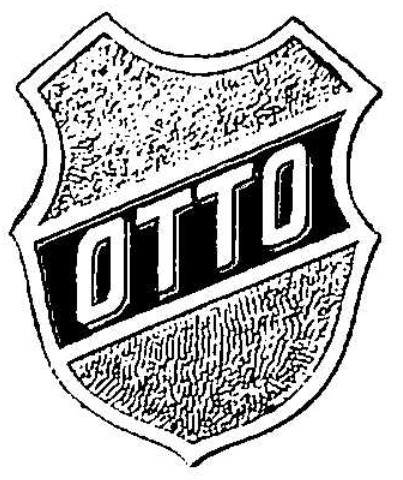
- The Largest and Oldest Builders of Gasoline Engines in the World
- Type: Automobile manufacturer
- Industry: Automotive
- Founded: 1910; 116 years ago
- Defunct: 1912; 114 years ago
- Fate: Closed
- Headquarters: Philadelphia, Pennsylvania, United States
- Key people: Murrell Dobbins, President
- Products: Automobiles
- Brands: Otto, Ottomobiles

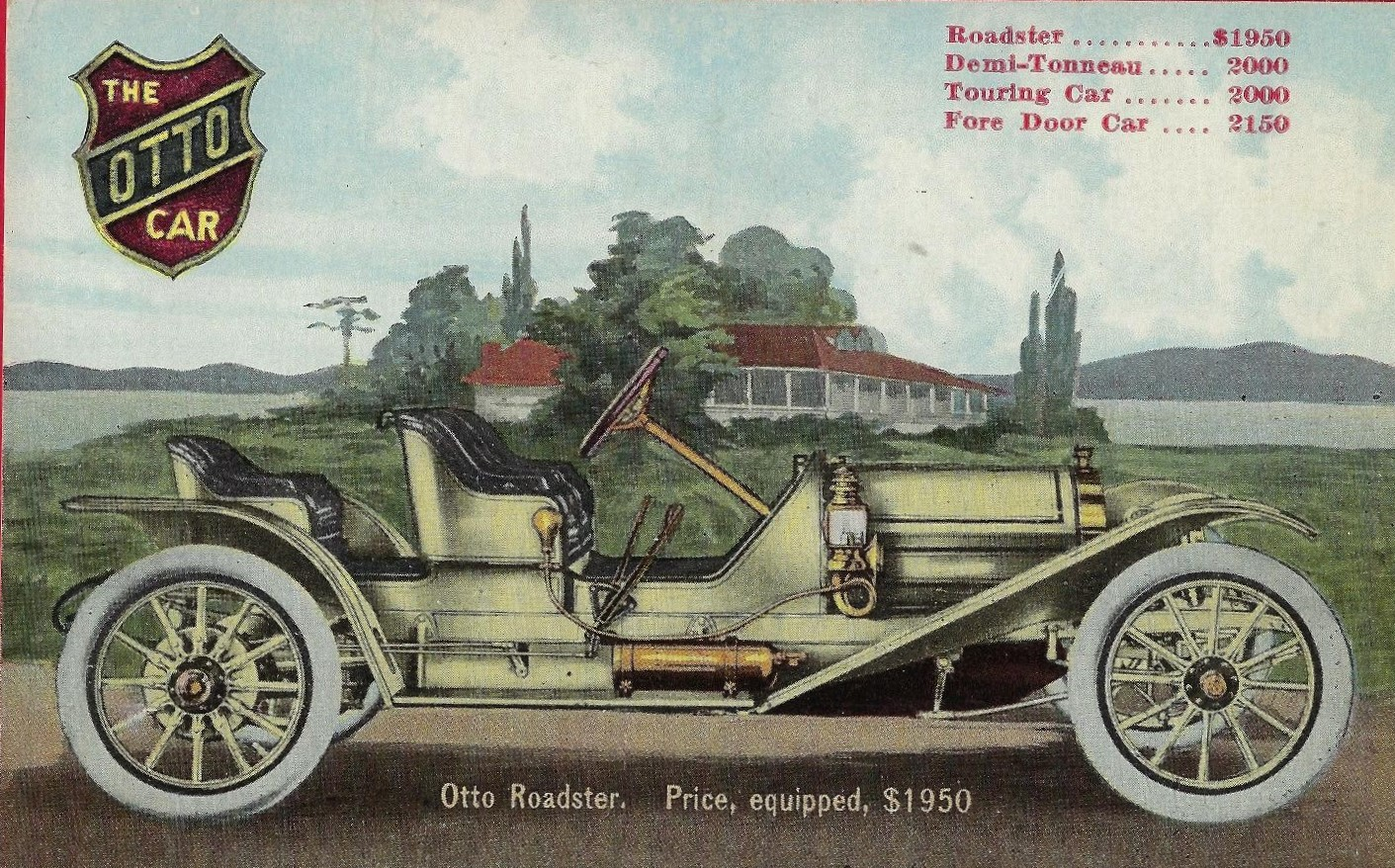
The Otto Car - 1911 postcard

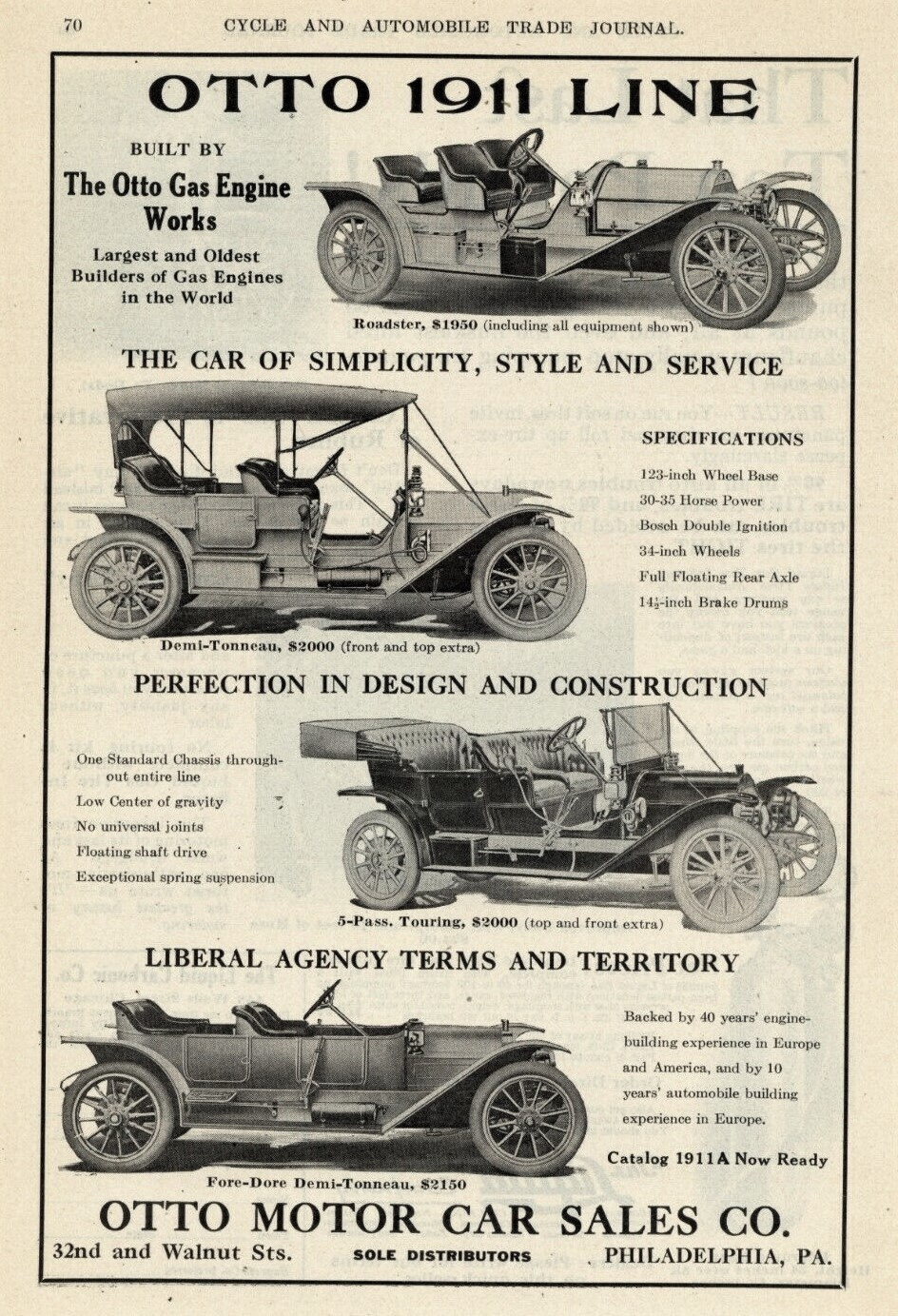
1911 Otto advertisement in Cycle and Automobile Trade Journal

Otto and Ottomobile were brass era automobile marques of the Otto Gas Engine Works of Philadelphia, Pennsylvania from 1910 to 1912.

== History ==
The Otto Gas Engine Works was established by Gas-motoren-Fabrik Deutz as a subsidiary to market the Otto engine in the United States. Based in Philadelphia, Otto Gas Engine experimented with gasoline vehicles resulting in the Otto Tractor in 1896. The primary business was stationary gas engines until 1910 when Otto Gas Engine introduced an automobile equipped with an Otto engine.

The Otto Motor Car Sales Company was set up to market an automobile with a four-cylinder 241 cubic inches (3.95 L) Otto engine on a wheelbase of 123 inches, with Roadster, Demi-Tonneau or Touring body styles. The Otto car was rated at 35-horsepower and was premium priced at $2,000, equivalent to $69,107 in 2025.

In 1911 the styles were expanded to include Victorias, Coupes and Limousines with a 286 cubic inches (4.69 L) or a 318 cubic inches (5.21 L) Otto four-cylinder engine, now rated at 38.9-hp. The Limousine was priced at $3,250, equivalent to $112,299 in 2025. For 1912 the cars were called Ottomobile and Otto Gas Engine decided to expand the factory, styles and open up sales to other automobile dealers. Instead, by late 1912 Otto Gas Engine decided to leave automobile manufacturing.

The Otto Gas Engine branch in France built automobiles from 1900 to 1914. The Otto Gas Engine company in Germany built cars in 1923 and 1924. Leading up to the First World War, Otto Gas Engine Works was required to sever its connection with its German parent company in 1915 and became a branch of Superior Gas Engine Company.
