= Mattituck, New York =

- Hamlet and census-designated place
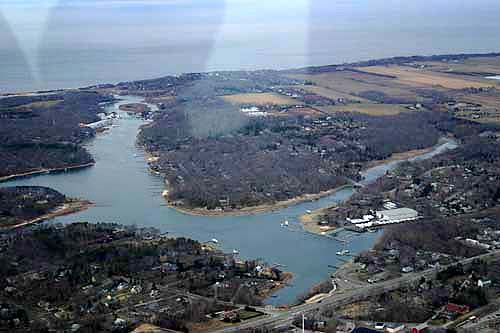
- Mattituck Inlet

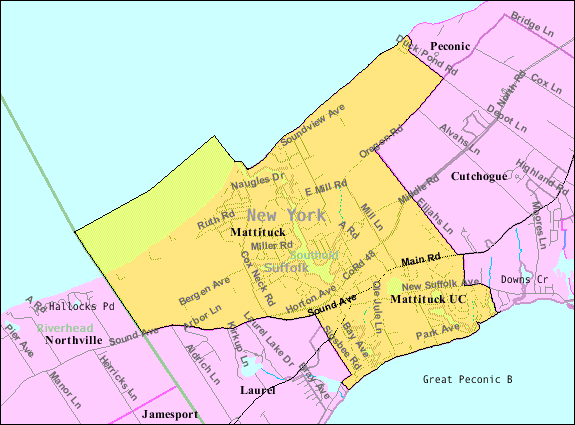

- Location on Long Island Location within the state of New York
- Coordinates: 40°59′41″N 72°32′14″W
- Country: United States
- State: New York
- County: Suffolk
- Town: Southold

Area
  - Total: 12.10 sq mi (31.35 km^{2})
  - Land: 8.98 sq mi (23.26 km^{2})
  - Water: 3.12 sq mi (8.09 km^{2})
- Elevation: 13 ft (4 m)

Population (2020)
  - Total: 4,322
  - Density: 481/sq mi (185.8/km^{2})
- Time zone: UTC−5 (Eastern (EST))
  - Summer (DST): UTC−4 (EDT)
- ZIP Code: 11952
- Area codes: 631, 934
- FIPS code: 36-46140
- GNIS feature ID: 0956678

Mattituck is a hamlet and census-designated place (CDP) within the Town of Southold in Suffolk County, on the North Fork of Long Island, New York, United States. The population was 4,322 at the time of the 2020 census.

== History ==
Mattituck is believed to have derived its name from the Algonquian name for "Great Creek". Mattituck Creek has been dredged and is used extensively by pleasure craft on the Long Island Sound (the Mattituck Inlet is the entrance into Mattituck Creek, and the whole waterway is now popularly referred to as Mattituck Inlet).

It is only one of two harbors (the other being Mt. Sinai harbor) on the north side of Long Island on the Sound east of Port Jefferson.

The Mattituck Inlet and James Creek (which has also been dredged for boats) on the Peconic Bay come within 500 yards (460 m) of each other and would provide a shortcut between the Peconic and Sound through the North Fork if connected via a canal. However, authorities have resisted the connection, fearing an ecological disaster. Still, the inlet is blamed for coastal erosion because it interrupts the longshore drift on the sound.

Corchaug Indians, who were the first residents of the area, sold land to Theophilus Eaton, governor of New Haven, Connecticut. The area was eventually settled by English colonists. The meadowlands were held in common by the residents of Southold from its founding in 1640. The town of Southold was established by Charter to the New Haven Colony of Connecticut in 1658. The woodlands were also held in common until 1661, when that land was divided among individual proprietors.

Mattituck was occupied by British troops during the Revolutionary War and Governor Tryon visited.

Mattituck hosts an annual Strawberry Festival and is located in the heart of over 40 vineyards in the Long Island Wine Region. The festival is usually held on Father's Day weekend every year.

== Geography ==
According to the United States Census Bureau, the community has a total area of 9.3 square miles (24.2 km^{2}), of which 9.0 square miles (23.3 km^{2}) is land and 0.35 square miles (0.9 km^{2}), or 3.88%, is water.

Historical population
Census	Pop.	Note	%±
2020	4,322		—
U.S. Decennial Census

== Demographics ==
=== 2020 census ===
As of the 2020 census, Mattituck had a population of 4,322. The median age was 50.8 years. 15.9% of residents were under the age of 18 and 25.6% of residents were 65 years of age or older. For every 100 females there were 100.1 males, and for every 100 females age 18 and over there were 97.7 males age 18 and over.

84.4% of residents lived in urban areas, while 15.6% lived in rural areas.

There were 1,805 households in Mattituck, of which 22.8% had children under the age of 18 living in them. Of all households, 53.9% were married-couple households, 16.5% were households with a male householder and no spouse or partner present, and 24.5% were households with a female householder and no spouse or partner present. About 27.2% of all households were made up of individuals and 14.6% had someone living alone who was 65 years of age or older.

There were 2,527 housing units, of which 28.6% were vacant. The homeowner vacancy rate was 1.0% and the rental vacancy rate was 7.2%.

Racial composition as of the 2020 census
Race	Number	Percent
White	3,661	84.7%
Black or African American	67	1.6%
American Indian and Alaska Native	16	0.4%
Asian	39	0.9%
Native Hawaiian and Other Pacific Islander	1	0.0%
Some other race	266	6.2%
Two or more races	272	6.3%
Hispanic or Latino (of any race)	516	11.9%

=== Income and poverty ===
The median income for a household in the hamlet was $55,353, and the median income for a family was $63,370. Males had a median income of $42,917 versus $34,813 for females. The per capita income for the CDP was $26,101. About 4.5% of families and 5.6% of the population were below the poverty line, including 5.7% of those under age 18 and 9.6% of those age 65 or over.

== Education ==
The Mattituck-Cutchogue Union Free School District is attended by residents of Mattituck, Cutchogue and Laurel. The sports teams' name is the Tuckers.

== Notable people ==
- James Aldrich (1810–1866), born in Mattituck, noted poet and journalist
- Caroline M. Bell (1874–1970), lived in Mattituck and formed a studio art school; impressionist painter, "Peconic Bay Impressionist"
- Francis Brill (1836–1913), farmer and member of the New York State Assembly
- William Lynch, Jr. (1941–2013), born in Mattituck, former New York City Deputy Mayor and political strategist
- John Bunyan Reeve (1831–1916), born in Mattituck, minister, professor that organized Howard University's Theology department and social activist. Uncle of Josephine Silone Yates
- Greg Sacks (1952–) NASCAR driver
- Cory Stearns (1985–) principal dancer, American Ballet Theatre
- Josephine Silone Yates (1852–1912), born in Mattituck, first African American woman to head a college science department, Lincoln University in Jefferson City, Missouri

== See also ==
- Mattituck Airport
