= Orient Beach =

Orient Beach may refer to:

- Orient Beach State Park, in Southold, New York
- Orient Long Beach Bar Light, a lighthouse off Orient, New York
- Orient Bay, a bay with a beach of the same name on the northeast coast of the Caribbean island of St-Martin
