= Peconic Bay scallops =

Scallops from the Peconic Bays, Long Island

Peconic Bay scallops are a population of northern bay scallops (Argopecten irradians subsp. irradians) found in the Peconic Bays of eastern Long Island. They are known as a regional culinary specialty and an important part of aquaculture in New York. The history of harvesting Peconic Bay scallops has been dated to the Late Woodland period, 1,000 to 1,500 years ago.

== Description ==
Bay scallops inhabit shallow bays with a range from Cape Cod to parts of Florida and Texas. Peconic Bay scallops are a northern subspecies of bay scallops that are found in the Peconic Estuary, between the northern and southern forks of Long Island. In the estuary, scallops spawn typically in early June, followed by a one- to two-week larval stage where the larvae are free-swimming, and eventually move out of the water column and into beds of eelgrass. The time of spawning varies by place as well as year, but typically occurs between late May and early June, with some years occurring in late July; it is also possible for second and third spawns to occur in late August or mid-September.

== Ecology ==
Peconic Bay scallops, like all bay scallops, are functional hermaphrodites that release both sperm and eggs alternately in the course of a single spawning event; spawning in the Peconic Bays usually begins between late May and mid-July, but spawn seasons have been recorded starting as late as September and October. Most scallops spawn during their first year of life and have a life expectancy between 18 and 22 months. Historically this has been advantageous for the Peconic Bay fishing industry as the adult scallops were fished without a presumed need for catch restrictions, as the majority of scallops would die in a short while if they were not caught. This life cycle makes scallop populations prone to large fluctuations in a short period of time, and therefore, the scallop industry very precarious.

Bay scallops, like hard clams and other shellfish species, are critical for filtering water and as a link in the estuary's food web.

Bay scallops are able to move by closing their two valves and shooting jets of water to propel themselves, unlike most other species of shellfish.

== History ==
Archeological evidence of Native American communities, including the Shinnecock Indian Nation, harvesting scallops in the Peconic Bays is robust. Large numbers of scallop shells have been discovered on locations around eastern Long Island, including Robins Island, Shelter Island, and Orient.

Beginning in the 1870s, the northern bay scallop fishery was an engine of economic growth in communities on and around the Peconic Bays, as well as other coastal communities along the eastern seaboard of the United States. For the following century, Peconic Bay scallops were an important part of the economy, particularly in the winter when other business activity decreased; Peconic Bay scallops are considered the "jewel" of eastern Long Island’s recreational and commercial fishery. In February 1900, thousands of bushels of scallops washed up onto the shores of Peconic Bay.

=== Collapses ===
Records of scallop population collapse date to as early as the 1930s, when eelgrass wasting disease destroyed the scallop's preferred habitat and the population subsequently plummeted. Beginning in 1985 and continuing into 1988, a series of harmful blooms of Aureococcus anophagefferens, also known as a brown tide, occurred in the waters around Long Island and decimated scallop populations. Although restoration efforts began in 1986 and populations began to increase again, another severe brown tide occurred in 1995; the total commercial harvest in New York of 1996 was 53 lbs, compared to a pre-brown tide annual average of 300,000 lbs.

Peconic Bay scallops experience regular die-offs, including one in 2019 and one in 2023; a survey in August 2023 of 21 scallop beds by Cornell University scientists found a total of 30 to 40 adult scallops. The U.S. National Oceanic and Atmospheric Administration declared the collapse of the Long Island scallop fishery a federal disaster in 2021. The value of commercially-fished scallops, after reaching a high of 1.5 million USD in 2018, dropped to 61,000 USD in 2021.

Scallops in nearby Moriches Bay, however, have experienced an upsurge in numbers. There have been proposals to transplant some Moriches Bay scallops to Peconic Bay as a test to determine if Moriches Bay scallops are more resilient to stress caused by warming waters and parasites than the Peconic Bay scallop population.

== Conservation ==
A brown algae bloom in 1985 reduced levels of Peconic Bay scallops to 1-2% of historical levels. As a result, the marine program at Cornell Cooperative Extension (CCE) began scallop restoration efforts in the late 1980s that continued into the 1990s.

In 2006 Stephen Tettelbach, head of the Peconic Bay Scallop Restoration Program at the CCE, spearheaded a project to introduce millions of larval scallops into the Peconic Estuary to support wild Peconic Bay scallop populations.

Scientists from Stony Brook University are researching the effects of selective breeding with funding from the New York Sea Grant. At a shellfish hatchery in Southold, New York, marine biologists from Cornell University have begun cultivating Moriches Bay scallop offspring with plans to introduce them into the Peconic Bay scallop population in January 2024. The hatchery used 300 Moriches Bay scallops to produce more than 2 million fertilized eggs, of which more than 1 million have grown into scallops. The hatchery aims to plant up to 200,000 scallops in the Peconic Bay in 2024.

=== Threats ===
In addition to the brown tide, scallop researchers suspect the Peconic Bay populations have been decimated by microsporidia, a spore-forming, unicellular parasite. The Peconic Bay scallops are uniquely vulnerable to the parasite due to heavy inbreeding. Ongoing efforts have worked on increasing genetic diversity among Peconic Bay scallop populations. Laboratory testing revealed that the parasite was most frequently detected in warmer temperatures.
