= Corchaug =

Historical Indigenous people of New York

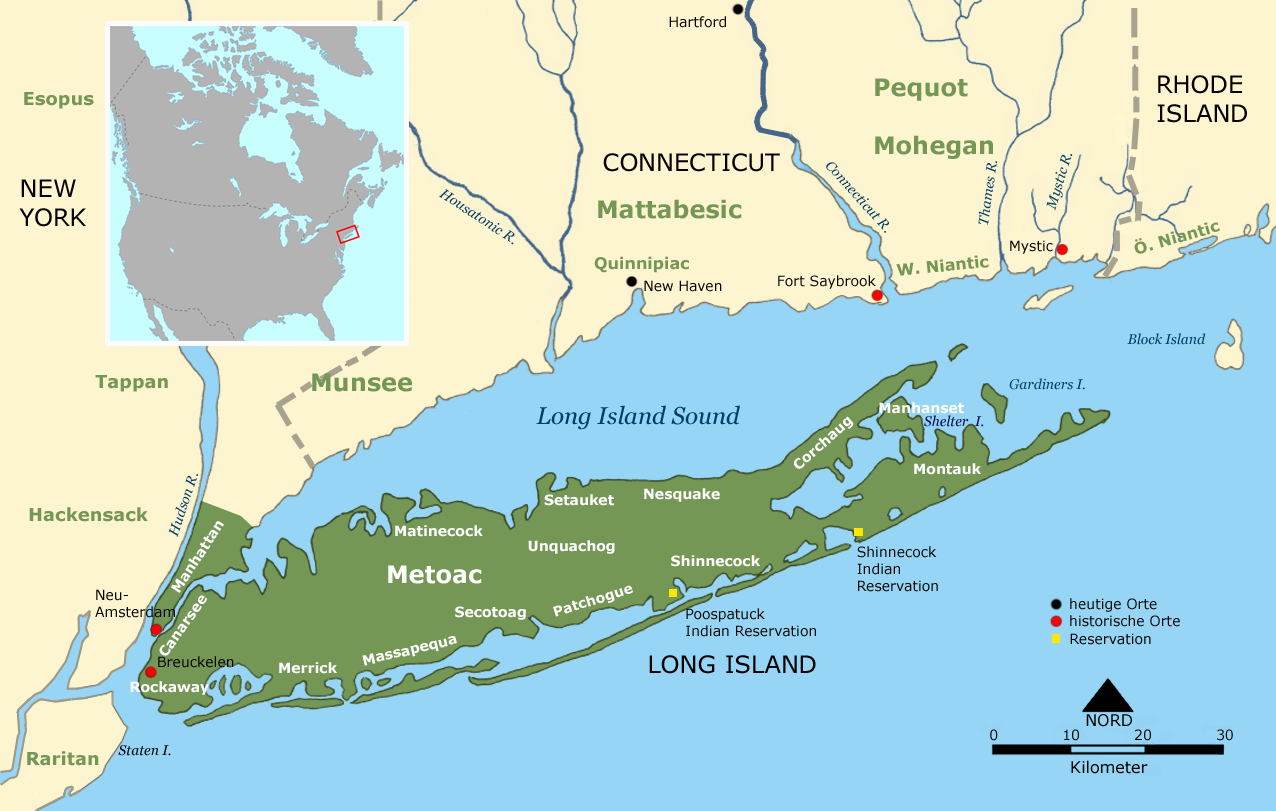
- The Corchaug are shown settled where North Fork is today.

Total population
- extinct as a people

Regions with significant populations
- Long Island, New York, U.S.

Languages
- Eastern Algonquian languages

Religion
- Indigenous religion

Related ethnic groups
- other Eastern Algonquian-speaking peoples

The Corchaug, also known as the Amanhansuck, were an Eastern Algonquian-speaking Indigenous people who inhabited the North Fork peninsula on the easternmost end Long Island in what is now the town of Southold and the hamlet of Cutchogue.

== Name ==
The earliest records identified the Indigenous people of North Fork as the Amanhansuck. European settlers later began calling them the Corchaug, which was once a name for the North Fork peninsula. According to historians of the Shinnecock Indian Nation, the Indigenous people of North Fork likely did not have a distinct name for themselves, but rather identified themselves according to their location of residence.

== History ==
The Corchaug were one of 4 Indigenous peoples inhabiting the East End of Long Island at the time of European colonization, along with the Montaukett, the Shinnecock, and the Manhansets. The Corchaug inhabited the North Fork Peninsula of Long Island from Orient Point to Wading River. The Corchaug are sometimes identified as part of the Montaukett cultural group.

=== 17th century ===
Prior to the arrival of European settlers, the Indigenous people of the North Fork had formed a confederacy along with the Manhasset of Shelter Island and the Indigenous peoples of the South Fork, including the Montaukett of Montauk and the Shinnecock of Southampton. By the 1660s, this confederation had given allegiance to the Pequot people of New England for purposes of trade and protection. While belonging to multiple, distinct Indigenous communities, this confederation selected a leader to collectively represent their communities to outsiders. The first leader of the confederacy was Poggatacut, the Sachem of the Manhasset. Along with Poggatacut, leadership of the confederacy also included Mamweto of the Corchaug, Wyandanch of the Montaukett, and Weenaganinin of the Shinnecock. While colonial literature refers to the four leaders as "brothers", it is unclear if they were biological brothers or were related through political alliances or through marriage.

Following the defeat of the Pequot and allied tribes during the Pequot War (1636-1639), a power vacuum was left on the East End of Long Island. Sachem Ninigret of the Niantic people and Narragansett allies invaded the East End in an attempt to subjugate the Indigenous peoples there. Ninigret's forces invaded and pillaged the Montaukett village while taking prisoners. Sachem Wyandanch of the Montaukett's home was infiltrated, his wampum was stolen, and his was stripped naked in public as a form of humiliation. The Niantic and Narragansett forces wanted to force the East End confederacy to ally with them rather than with the English settlers. The raid resulted in Wyandanch and the confederacy increasing their relations with the English. Following the raid, Wyandanch and Poggatacut began to grant Indigenous land to the English settlers. After gaining land from the East End confederacy, the English settlers began to more aggressively encroach on Indigenous lands of the East End.

=== 18th century ===
By 1746, the Corchaug population of the East End had decreased due to migration and population loss, primarily from disease and old age. The last of the Corchaug may have resettled on Indian Neck in Long Island. According to the historian J. Wickham Case, the Corchaug "died out" due to population loss and migration, recording an enslaved woman named Kate who reported that she "knew several Indian families living around the Necks. Especially one named Yoopsag, who had her hut in the squaw lot at South Harbor...but that they kept disappearing, till she remembers none left." Some Corchaug descendants may have joined with descendants of the Montaukett sachem Ambusco on Shelter Island. According to Shinnecock historians, surviving Corchaug descendants fled to Upstate New York to avoid European settlers. Documentation of what happened to the last of the Corchaug is unclear. In 1746, residents of Southold testified that the last of the Corchaug, who had been farming and tending to an orchard and plant nursery in the region, had all disappeared.

== See also ==
- Fort Corchaug Archaeological Site
