= Greenport Union Free School District =

School district in the U.S. state of New York

Location
- 720 Front St. Greenport, New York United States

District information
- Type: Public
- Grades: PK–12
- Superintendent: Beth Doyle
- Asst. superintendent(s): Ryan Case
- Schools: One junior/senior high school, one elementary school

Students and staff
- Students: 673 (as of 2025)
- District mascot: The Porters

Other information
- Website: www.gufsd.org

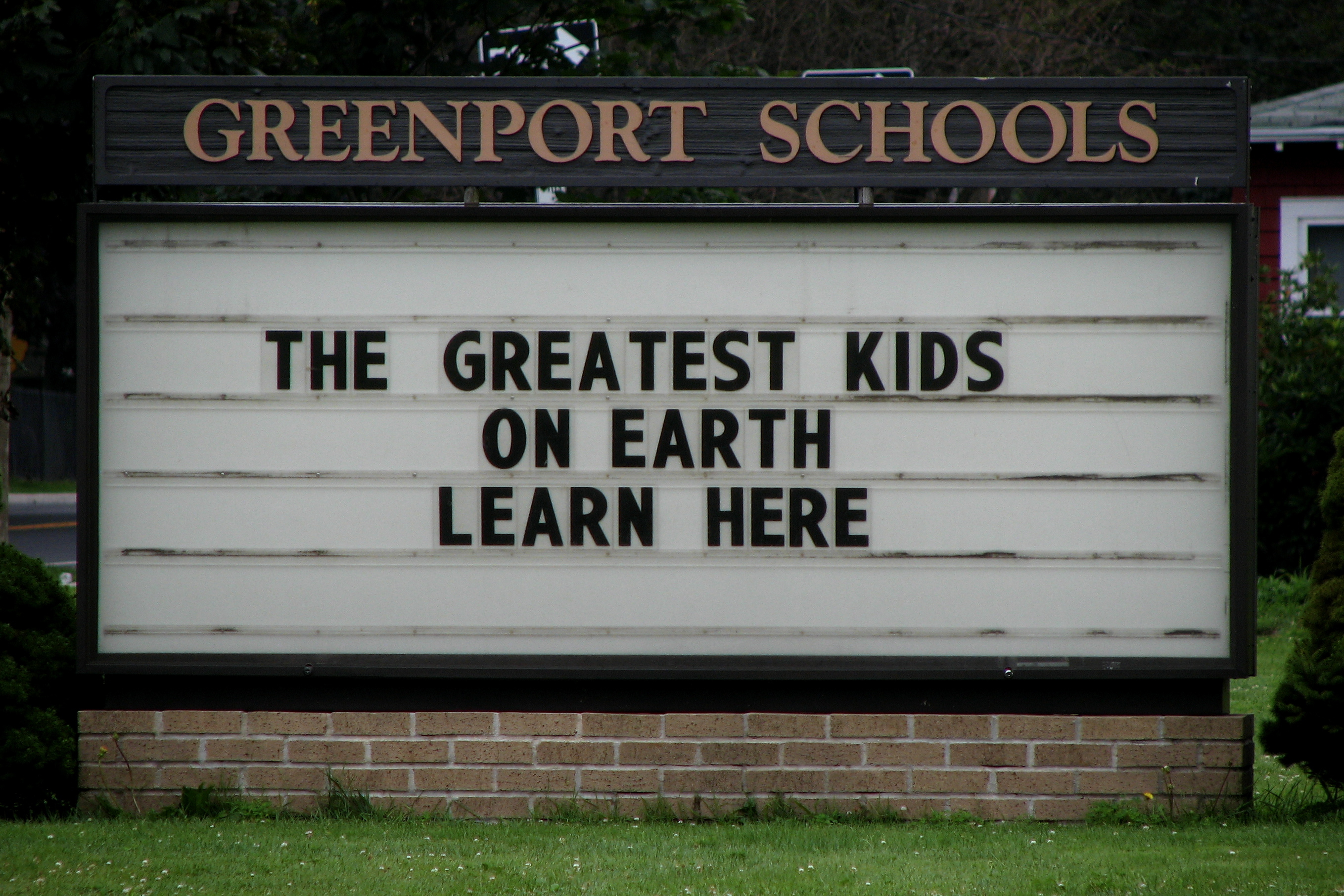

Greenport Union Free School District is a public school district located on the North Fork of Long Island, in the Town of Southold, Suffolk County, New York, United States. It includes the entirety of the village of Greenport and the census-designated place (CDP) of Greenport West. It also includes parts of Southold and East Marion. To the west, the district is bordered by the Southold Union Free School District; and on the east, the Oysterponds Union Free School District.

The total enrollment as of November 2025 is 673 students.

== Schools ==
- Greenport High School. The current high school building was originally opened in 1933. The school also educates students from Oysterponds Union Free School District.
- Greenport Elementary School. The current elementary school building was built in 1933.
