= Oysterponds Union Free School District =

Public school district in Suffolk County, New York, US

Location
- Southold Suffolk County, New York Southold, New York United States

District information
- Type: Public
- Grades: PreK-6th
- Superintendent: Justin Cobis
- Schools: 1

Students and staff
- Students: 85-95 on average
- Faculty: Dr.Daniel Goldfarb (School Psychologist), Amy Bennett (School Nurse), Melissa Palermo (Business Manager)
- Teachers: 17 as of 2023

Other information
- Website: https://www.oysterponds.org

Oysterponds Union Free School District is a public school district located in the town of Southold, Suffolk County, New York, United States. It is the easternmost school district on the North Fork of Long Island. The district includes the census-designated places (CDPs) of East Marion and Orient. To the west, the district is bordered by the Greenport Union Free School District.

As of 2015, Oysterponds Union Free School District had 86 students.

At the beginning of the 2013–2014 school year, the school district introduced combined grade classes into the only school, Oysterponds Elementary School, combining the kindergarten and preschool classes into the class of primary I; first- and second-grade students into the class of primary II; third- and fourth-grade students into the class of intermediate I; and the fifth- and sixth-grade students into the class of intermediate II.

The superintendent and principal is Justin Cobis

Jennifer Wissemann is the principal's assistant

== Schools ==
The only school operated by the district is Oysterponds Elementary School (grades K-6). Currently, the district pays for middle and high school students (grades 7–12) to be educated in the adjacent Greenport School District.

Proposals to merge the school district with its neighbors to the west have been discussed in the past, but have not been approved.
