= Effects of the December 2022 North American blizzard in New York =

Meteorological history
- Formed: December 22, 2022
- Dissipated: December 26, 2022

Winter storm
- Highest gusts: 79 mph (127 km/h) in Lackawanna, New York.
- Max. snowfall: 56.5 in (144 cm) in Snyder, New York, U.S.

Extratropical cyclone

Overall effects
- Fatalities: 47
- Areas affected: New York, particularly Erie County
- Power outages: >127,000
- Part of the 2022–23 North American winter

In late December 2022, a blizzard caused devastating impacts in the state of New York, particularly for the Buffalo metropolitan area.

== Background ==
On December 21, a winter storm formed in the Rocky Mountains, triggering record temperature drops in the region. Early on December 23, the storm reached New York. Across the Buffalo metropolitan area, the difference between the water temperature and air temperature triggered lake-effect snow for several days. Despite rain falling in the early morning hours on the 23rd in the Buffalo area, it quickly turned to snow, as wind speeds exceeded 60 miles per hour (97 km/h). The blizzard lasted until the morning of December 26. The snow in Buffalo finally stopped late on December 27.

== Impact ==
=== Western New York ===
The blizzard's intense wind gusts blowing over the warm waters of Lake Erie triggered record lake-effect snow to Buffalo, New York, which at first fell as rain but later converted to snow and accumulated to 56.5 in (144 cm) over 5 days in Snyder adjacent to Buffalo, ending on December 27. At Buffalo Niagara International Airport, snowfall was 22.3 in (57 cm) on December 23, 17.9 in (45 cm) on December 24, 2.8 in (7.1 cm) on December 25, 7.3 in (19 cm) on December 26 and 1.6 in (4.1 cm) on December 27, for a total of 51.9 in (132 cm). The snow total on December 23 also broke a daily record. To the north, Niagara Falls received 18.9 inches (48 cm) of snowfall over the period. Buffalo experienced zero visibility/complete whiteout conditions from 9 a.m. on December 23 until 1 a.m. on December 25 and again from 5 a.m. until 7 a.m. on December 26. Buffalo's 37.5 consecutive hours of blizzard conditions was the longest blizzard in the city's history, as well as the longest blizzard of any city below 5,000 feet (1,500 m) in the United States. Lasting nearly two full days, Buffalo's first blizzard since January 6, 2014 (as defined by the National Weather Service) forced snow into massive drifts, shuttering the city and leaving hundreds stranded. Winds in Buffalo gusted over 45 mph (72 km/h) for more than 24 consecutive hours and between 9 a.m. and 3 p.m. on December 23, winds exceeded 60 miles per hour (97 km/h) every hour. The highest reported winds in Buffalo were 79 mph (127 km/h). The blizzard also deposited high lake-effect snowfall amounts on the shores of Lake Ontario, with Henderson Harbor, near Watertown, recording 40.8 in (104 cm) with the Watertown area experiencing blizzard conditions for parts of December 23, 24 and 25. During the storm, wind chills in the Buffalo area dipped as low as −30 °F (−34 °C).

At least 39 people died in Erie County alone, surpassing the death toll from the Blizzard of 1977, which was previously regarded as the worst snowstorm in the region. The damage estimate by the National Climatic Data Center for the region was $15.5 million. The total death toll for the state was 47. A travel ban was put in effect for the Buffalo area on December 23 at 9:30 a.m. and remained in effect until December 29 at 12:01 a.m. On December 27, state and military police were sent to Buffalo to enforce the driving ban to enable snow-clearing efforts to progress. The Erie County Sheriff indicated that over 420 EMS calls had gone unanswered because emergency vehicles were unable to travel through the deep snow. During the height of the blizzard, two-thirds of emergency vehicles sent out to rescue people had ended up needing to be rescued themselves. City officials say this marked the first time in Buffalo's history that the fire department could not respond to calls. Two Buffalo Sabres games were postponed due to the storm, with one being a road game in Columbus where the team couldn't leave due to Buffalo Niagara International Airport being shut down. The airport was shut down for nearly five full days amidst the snow. Interstate 190 and Interstate 290 shut down due to the storm. The New York State Thruway was shut down between Rochester and the border with Pennsylvania, with the international border crossings on Peace Bridge, Lewiston–Queenston Bridge and Rainbow Bridge closing. Niagara Falls partially froze due to the snowstorm. Over 100,000 customers in the region lost power during the intense storm as well.

Further north, the snowstorm in the Watertown area resulted in 200 cars being forced off the road and into snowdrifts, with portions of Interstate 81 shutting down. The storm resulted in travel restrictions by the Thousand Islands Travel Authority from midday on December 23 through midday on December 24, with lingering delays afterwards.

=== Eastern New York ===
In the Capital District, parts of NY-143 were shut down due to flooding. Wind gusts in Albany reached as high as 51 miles per hour (82 km/h). East Nassau picked up 6.0 inches (15 cm) of snow. Meanwhile, flooding and the flash freeze resulted in an ice jam in Pierrepont, forcing several to be rescued from their homes.

In New York City, part of the Henry Hudson Parkway closed in The Bronx. The Verrazzano–Narrows Bridge was also closed down, and in southern Long Island, parts of the Meadowbrook State Parkway and Wantagh State Parkway were shut down. Large portions of Jones Beach State Park, Gilgo State Park and Robert Moses State Park were left underwater, with frozen floodwaters shutting down Orient Beach State Park. The Long Beach Branch of the Long Island Rail Road was shut down in both directions between Penn Station and Long Beach due to flash flooding, and the Metro North Hudson line was temporarily suspended between Poughkeepsie and Peekskill because of flooding as well. The Staten Island Ferry was suspended for around an hour. All buses in Queens were delayed, with the Q53-SBS being totally suspended. LaGuardia Airport had 437 cancellations and 416 delays, while John F. Kennedy International Airport had 181 cancellations and 528 delays. Major coastal flooding occurred in the city, with The Battery recording water levels as high as 8.27 feet (2.52 m), with Jamaica Bay having water levels at 9.87 feet (3.01 m), and Kings Point having water levels as high as 11.76 feet (3.58 m). Heavy rainfall also affected the region, with 1.5–2.5 inches (38–64 mm) of rain falling on December 23. The storm resulted in over 27,000 power outages on Long Island.

Following the storm, the New York metropolitan area recorded their coldest temperature in nearly four years, since January 31, 2019. High temperatures on December 24 in the region were record lows at Islip, LaGuardia Airport and JFK Airport, and the coldest in 150 years on Christmas Eve at Central Park.

== Aftermath ==
On December 30, a flood watch was issued for the Buffalo area as a major warmup was predicted to cause the snow to rapidly melt.

Following the storms, officials in Erie County worked to increase warning systems before storms. The National Weather Service stated there was ample notice of the storm. On March 15, Joe Biden approved the disaster declaration for areas of Western New York, providing federal aid to the area. USA Today later launched an investigation into the issue, discovering that there was no federal involvement during the first three days, that a lack of cooperation between Buffalo and Erie County officials led to over a thousand 9-1-1 calls being left unanswered, and flaws in the rescue system cut down on rescue attempts. At least one death was blamed on poor emergency response management.

On December 24, a gas emergency was declared by ConEd asking customers to lower their thermostats to prevent a "catastrophic" gas failure. In December 2023, a report revealed that the gas system nearly failed, which would have left millions without heat in the record cold conditions.
