= Nick Baines =

Nick or Nicholas Baines may refer to:

- Nick Baines (bishop) (born 1957), bishop in the Church of England
- Nick "Peanut" Baines (born 1978), keyboardist of the English indie-rock band Kaiser Chiefs

== See also ==
- Baines
- Nick Bain (born 1979), American politician from Mississippi
- Nicholas Bain (1824–1854), American murderer
