= Orient Beach State Park =

State park in New York, United States

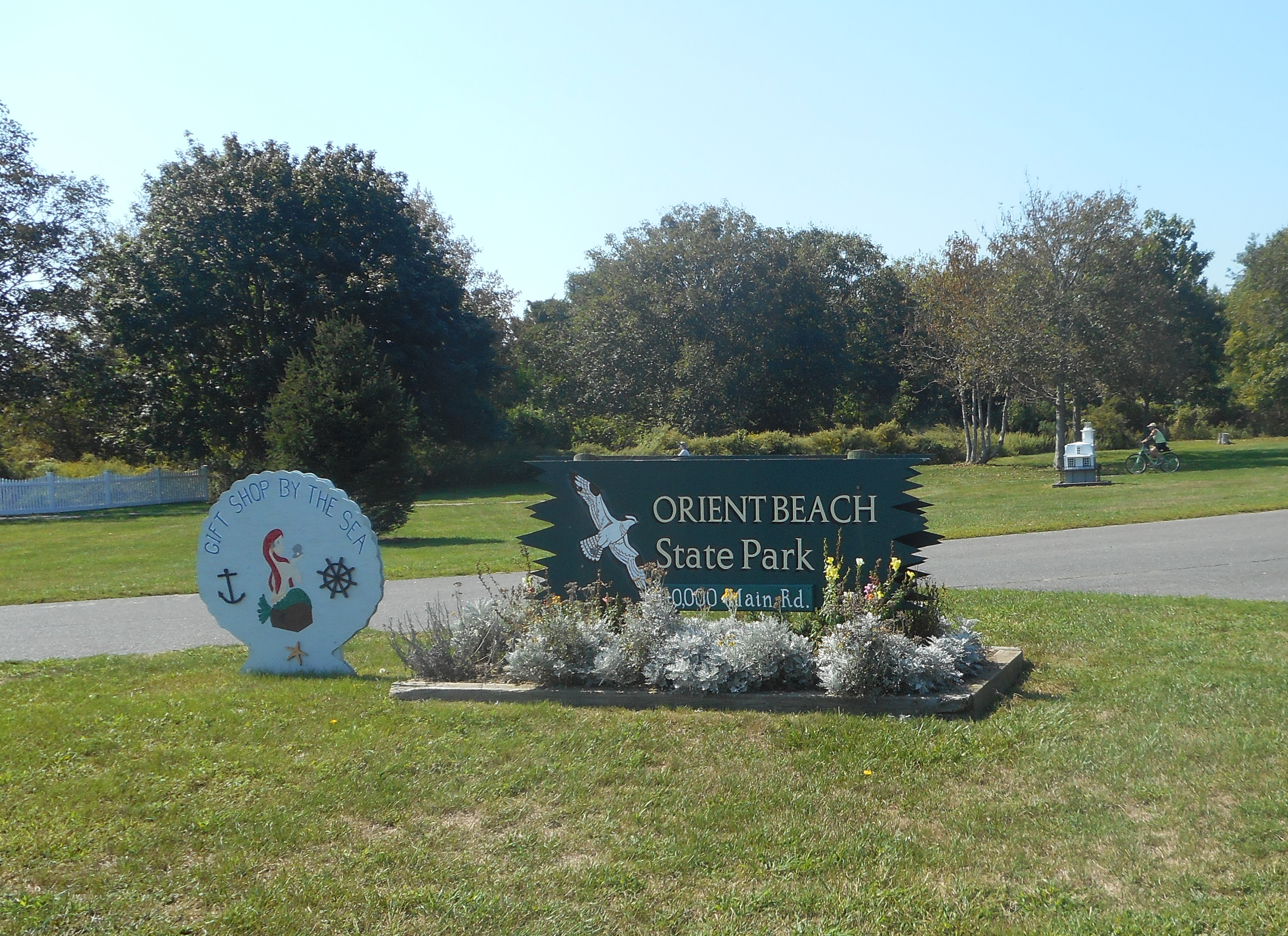
- The entrance to Orient Beach State Park from westbound New York State Route 25.

- Location within New York
- Type: State park
- Location: 40000 Main Road (Route 25); Orient, New York
- Nearest city: Orient, New York
- Coordinates: 41°07′46″N 72°15′59″W
- Area: 363 acres (1.47 km^{2})
- Created: October 1929
- Operator: New York State Office of Parks, Recreation and Historic Preservation
- Visitors: 135,043 (in 2024)
- Open: All year
- Website: Orient Beach State Park

Orient Beach State Park is a 363-acre (1.47 km^{2}) state park located in Southold, New York. The park is situated at the tip of the North Fork of Long Island.

Long Beach, located within the park, was designated a National Natural Landmark in April 1980 for its 2.5-mile (4.0 km) sand spit beach demonstrating plant succession from salt marsh to maritime red cedar forest.

The Orient Long Beach Bar Light, commonly known as Bug Light, is located inside the park.

== Recreation ==
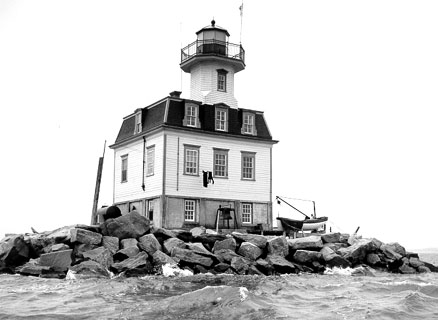
Orient Long Beach Bar Light at the tip of Orient Beach State Park.

The park offers 45,000 feet (14,000 m; 8.5 mi) of bay frontage, and includes a beach, picnic tables with pavilions, a playground, recreation programs, a nature trail, hiking and biking (rentals available), fishing and a food concession. The park is open throughout the year for day-use only.

=== Restrictions on boat access ===
In 1997, park rangers began enforcing an existing no boating policy on Long Beach, leading to controversy and ticketing in 2000. State officials contended that renewed enforcement was enacted to protect the beach's value as a protected sanctuary for endangered birds such as the piping plover, in addition to preserving the beach's unusual maritime red cedar forest and other rare plants.

== Flora and fauna ==
There is a common and roseate tern nesting area in the park. There are also eelgrass beds offshore.

== See also ==
- List of New York state parks
- List of National Natural Landmarks in New York
