= James Aldrich =

American editor and poet

- Born: July 14, 1810; Mattituck, New York, US
- Died: September 9, 1856 (aged 46)

James Aldrich (1810–1856) was an editor and minor poet.

Aldrich was born in Mattituck, New York, apparently July 14, 1810, the sixth of the ten children of James Aldrich and Helen Hudson. He was a merchant from a young age. Following his marriage to Matilda Hall Lyon in 1836, having had some success as a writer, at the age of 26 he was able to abandon business for literature. He founded the short-lived New York Literary Gazette in 1839, and later in 1842–44 worked as an editor on the New World (New York). In the latter part of his life he resumed his business pursuits.

Much of his poetry was published in his Literary Gazette, and not brought together in a collection until after his death, when his daughter circulated it privately. His poem A Death-Bed is often republished.
