= Peconic Land Trust =

- Founded: 1983
- Founder: John v.H. Halsey
- Location: Southampton, New York
- Region served: Long Island
- Website: www.peconiclandtrust.org

The Peconic Land Trust is a non-profit land trust based in Southampton, New York, United States, that exists to protect Long Island's agricultural and natural landscapes. Founded in 1983, PLT has conserved over 14,000 acres. Peconic Land Trust maintains stewardship centers at Quail Hill Farm in Amagansett (1990), Bridge Gardens in Bridgehampton (2008), and Agricultural Center at Charnews Farm‌‍‍‍‌‍‌‍‌‍‍‌‌‍‌‌‍‍‌‌‍‍‍‍‍‍‍‍‌‌‍‌‌‍‍‌‍‍‌‌‌‌‍‌‍‍‌‍‍‌‌‍‍‍‍‍‍‌‍‍‌‍‌‍‌‌‌‍‌‍‍‍‍‍‍‍‌‍‍‌‌‌‌‌‌‍‍‍‍‌‍‌‍‌‌‍‍‌‌‍‌‌‌‍‌‍‌‍‍‌‍‍‌‌‍‌‍‌‍‌‌‍‍‌‍‌‌‌‌‍‌‌‌‌‌‌‍‍‌‍‌‍‌‍‌‍‌‍‍‌‌‍‍‌‌‌‍‌‌‌‍‍‌‌‍‌‍‌‌‌‍‌‌‍‍‌‌‌‍‌‍‌‌‍‌‍‌‌‍‌‌‌‌‌‍‌‍‌‌‌‌‍‌‌‌‍‍‌‌‌‍‌‌‌‌‍‍‌‌‍‌‍‍‍‌‍‍‌‌‍‌‌‌‍‌‍‌‍‌‌‍‌‍‌‌‌‍‌‌‍‌‍‌‌‌‍‌‌‍‌‌‌‌‌‍‍‌‌‍‌‌‌‌‌‍‍‌‍‌‍‌‌‍‌‌‌‍‌‌‍‍‍‌‍‌‌‌‌‍‌‌‌‍‌‌‌‍‌‌‌‌‌‍‌‍‌‍‍‍‌‍‌‌‌‍‌‌‍‌‌‍‌‌‌‌‍‍‌‌‌‌‍‍‌‌‌‌‍‌‍‌‌‌‍‍‌‍‌‌‌‍‌‌‌‌‌‌‌‍‌‍‌‌‍‍‌‌‌‌‌‌‍‌‌‌‌‍‌‌‍‌‌‍‍‌‌‍‌‌‍‌‍‌‍‌‌‍‍‌‌‍‌‌‌‍‌‍‌‍‍‌‍‍‌‌‍‌‍‌‍‌‌‍‍‌‍‌‌‌‌‍‌‌‌‌‌‌‍‍‌‍‌‍‌‍‌‍‌‍‌‍‍‌‌‍‌‌‌‍‌‍‌‍‌‌‍‌‍‌‌‌‍‌‌‍‌‍‌‌‌‍‌‌‍‌‌‌‌‌‍‍‌‌‍‌‌‌‌‌‍‍‌‍‌‍‌‌‍‌‌‌‍‌‌‍‍‍‌‍‌‌‌‌‍‌‍‌‌‌‍‌‌‌‍‌‌‌‌‌‍‌‍‌‍‍‍‌‍‌‌‌‍‌‌‍‌‍‌‌‍‌‌‌‌‍‍‌‌‌‌‍‍‌‌‌‌‍‌‍‌‌‍‌‍‌‌‍‌‌‌‍‌‌‌‍‌‌‌‍‌‌‌‍‍‌‌‌‍‌‍‌‌‌‌‌‌‌‌‍‍‌‍‌‍‍‌‌‌‍‍‌‍‌‌‌‍‌‍‍‌‌ in Southold (2008). The Trust works with the Long Island Farm Bureau and local Community Preservation Funds.

Sugar Loaf Hill, a sacred Shinnecock burial ground in Southampton, was purchased in July 2021 and returned to the tribe through the Niamuck Land Trust.

The Trust has also been involved in the preservation of Hallock State Park Preserve, Sylvester Manor Educational Farm, and Downs Farm Preserve.
