= Orient Historic District =

Historic district in New York, United States

- U.S. National Register of Historic Places
- U.S. Historic district
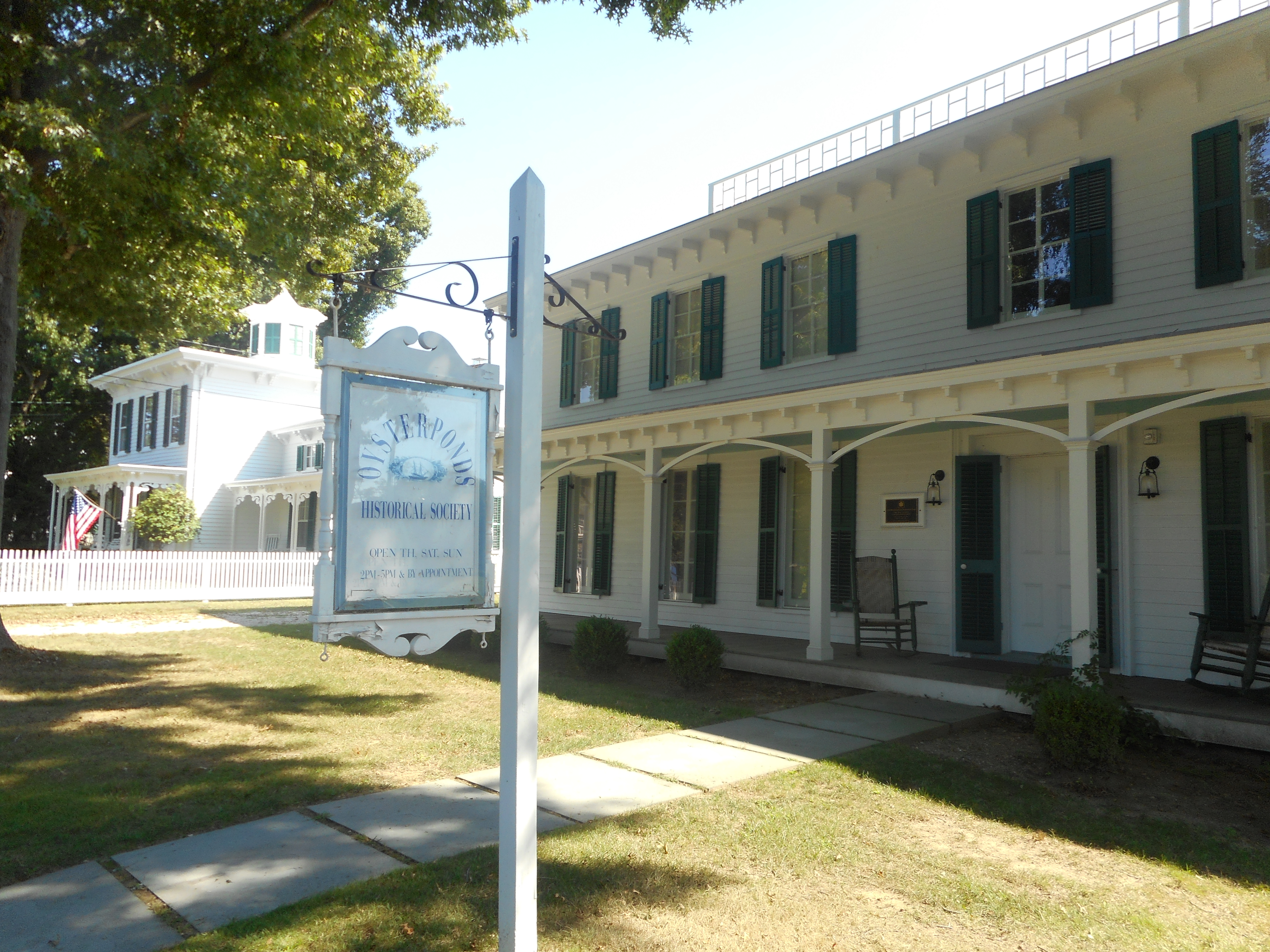
- The Oysterponds Historical Society on Village Lane within the district

- Location within New York Location within the United States
- Location: NY 25, Orient, New York
- Coordinates: 41°8′21″N 72°18′11″W
- Area: 60 acres (24 ha)
- Built: 1730
- Architect: Shaw, Richard
- Architectural style: Greek Revival, Italianate, Federal
- NRHP reference No.: 76001283
- Added to NRHP: May 21, 1976

The Orient Historic District is a national historic district in Orient in Suffolk County, New York, United States. The district has 120 contributing buildings and one contributing structure. They were constructed between the late 18th and late 19th century, the most common building type being a "Cape Cod type," a frame dwelling of one and one half stories sheathed in shingles or clapboard. It also includes a number of examples of popular 19th-century building styles, such as Italianate. The focal point of the district is Orient Wharf, established in 1740.

It was added to the National Register of Historic Places in 1976.
