= Parker Wickham =

Town Supervisor of Southold
- In office Several terms (Exact years: TBD)

Justice of Suffolk County
- In office 1763

Fence Viewer
- In office 1751

Overseer of the Poor
- In office 1754–1755

Town Assessor
- In office 1765–1766

Personal details
- Born: February 28, 1727 Cutchogue, Long Island, New York, British America
- Died: May 22, 1785 (aged 58) Waterford, Connecticut, United States
- Party: Loyalist
- Spouse: Mary Goldsmith
- Children: Several (Details TBD)
- Profession: Politician, Militia officer
- Known for: Loyalist views, Banished from New York

Parker Wickham (February 28, 1727–May 22, 1785) was a Loyalist politician who was banished from the State of New York under dubious circumstances.

Wickham was the oldest son of Joseph Wickham and Abigail Parker of Cutchogue, Long Island, New York. Wickham inherited nearly all of his father's large estate at age 22, including Robins Island. He lived in the Old House in Cutchogue, which was built in 1699. Currently a museum, it is said to be one of the oldest English-style houses still in existence in the USA. Wickham married Mary Goldsmith and had several children. He was the brother (and rival) of Patriot leader Thomas Wickham and the uncle of Federalist attorney John Wickham.

In 1751, Wickham was elected as Fence Viewer. He was elected in both 1754 and 1755 as Overseer of the Poor, and in 1763, he received an appointment as justice for the County of Suffolk. He was elected town assessor in 1765 and 1766, then elected nine times to the highest post of local government, town supervisor of the Town of Southold. In addition, he served as a major in the local militia.

During the American Revolution, Wickham was known for his pro-Loyalist views. He was kidnapped by Connecticut rebels on December 13, 1777, and placed on parole soon after. He was required to forfeit his property without compensation on October 22, 1779, after a bill of attainder was passed by New York's legislature. He was also banished from the state under threat of death. Wickham was forced to move to Connecticut, where he died. He insisted he was innocent of the charges, but he was never granted a trial. Acts of attainder were banned under the U.S. Constitution, adopted a few years after Wickham's death.

Shortly before his death in exile, Wickham wrote:

I have acted consistently and consciously throughout my whole conduct, with a firm belief there is a future existence, and defy the state to produce one instance wherein I have acted rigidly, defrauded, or abused one member of it, although it was in my power.

In 1989, several of Wickham's heirs filed a lawsuit to try to regain ownership of Robins Island. Though the lawsuit failed, it discouraged development, and most of the island is now protected by an easement to The Nature Conservancy.

Wickham was buried in the Raymond Cemetery in Waterford, Connecticut.
