= Fort Corchaug Archaeological Site =

- Fort Corchaug Archeological Site
- U.S. National Register of Historic Places
- U.S. National Historic Landmark
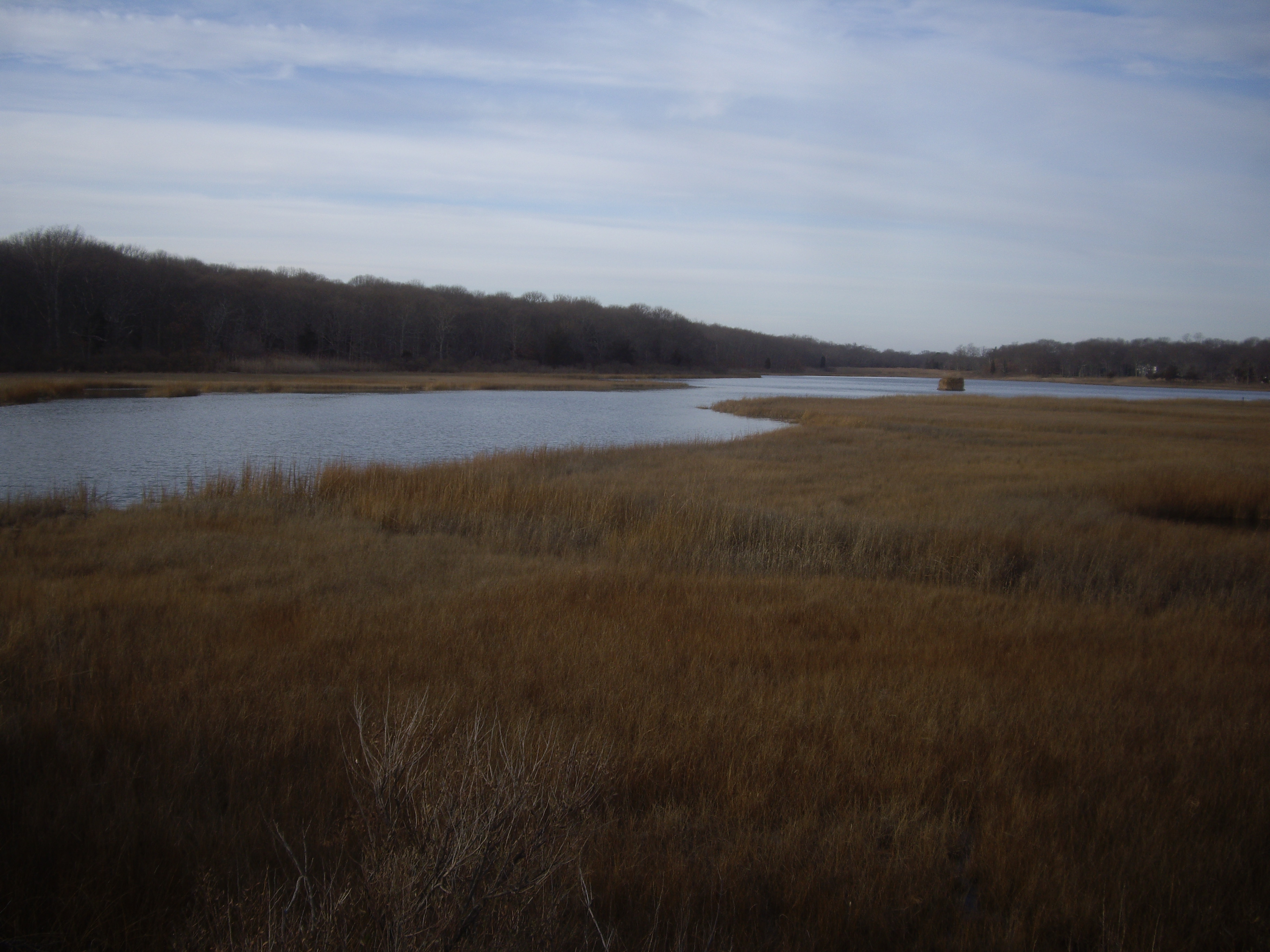
- Fort Corchaug Vicinity

- Location within New York Location within the United States
- Location: Cutchogue, Town of Southold, NY
- Coordinates: 41°00′09.66″N 72°29′55.48″W
- NRHP reference No.: 74001308

Significant dates
- Added to NRHP: January 18, 1974
- Designated NHL: January 20, 1999

Fort Corchaug Archeological Site is a prehistoric archaeological site in Cutchogue on eastern Long Island in New York State. It is located west of the North Fork Country Club, on the south side of Main Road (New York State Route 25). The site shows evidence of 17th century contact between Native Americans and Europeans. Fort Corchaug itself was a log fort built by Native Americans. It may have been to protect the Corchaug tribe from other Indians, built with the help of Europeans. Ralph Solecki, a prominent American archaeologist, grew up nearby and conducted several digs on site.

It remains today one of the few undisturbed Native American fortified village sites in the North East. and was declared a National Historic Landmark in 1999. The 105-acre (42 ha) property where the fort is located is protected in part by a conservation easement owned by the Peconic Land Trust, and is in part owned by the town of Southold as a nature preserve. Known as the Downs Farm Preserve, it is open to the public with hiking trails.

The Corchaug tribe historically inhabited the land from the Nassau border to Montauk Point. Depradation by the Narragansetts of Connecticut and decimation from smallpox caused to tribe to leave their land in the South Fork and with the help of white settlers built forts to ward off attacks. Another fort still being excavated is Fort Hill (now in Montauk County Park) in Montauk Point, described as "one of the earliest and best for its time", it was placed on a 1658 map of Long Island.
