= Old House (Cutchogue) =

Historic house in New York, United States

- The Old House
- U.S. National Register of Historic Places
- U.S. National Historic Landmark
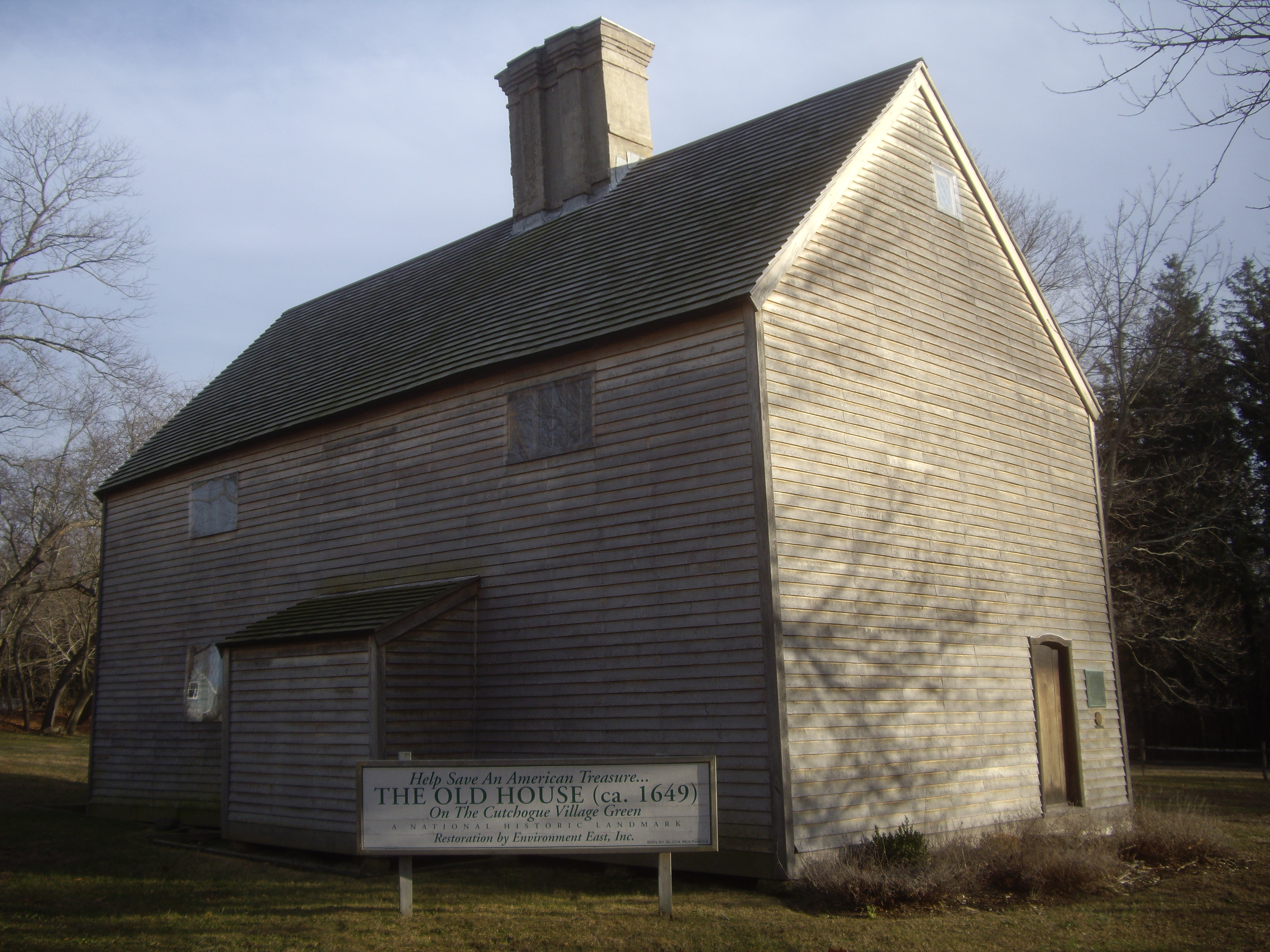

- Location within New York Location within the United States
- Location: Village Green, Cutchogue, New York
- Coordinates: 41°0′29.4″N 72°29′10.04″W
- Area: less than one acre
- Built: 1699
- Architectural style: English domestic
- NRHP reference No.: 66000573

Significant dates
- Added to NRHP: October 15, 1966
- Designated NHL: November 5, 1961

The Old House is a historic home on State Route 25 in Cutchogue in Suffolk County, New York. It is "notable as one of the most distinguished surviving examples of English domestic architecture in America."

== Architecture ==
The Old House is a two-story timber-frame structure measuring about 36 by 20 feet (11.0 m × 6.1 m), with a clapboarded exterior and gabled roof. Its main facade is on the south side, with a center entrance framed by a simple trim with a segmented-arch lintel. On either side of the door there are three-part casement windows on both the first and second floors. Three similar windows appear on the north (back) side of the house which are careful replicas of the original windows.

The interior of the house is divided into four rooms, two on each floor. A large brick chimney separates the rooms on each floor and divides the attic in two. Narrow winding staircases on one side provide access to the upper levels. The ground-floor kitchen has a fireplace over 9 feet (2.7 m) long and 3 feet (0.91 m) deep. At some point (probably in the 18th century), that fireplace and the one in the main hall had smaller fireplaces built within them, with the excess covered by wooden paneling. It is likely that the walls that were not paneled at that time were finished in plaster.

== History ==
=== Debate over origin ===
According to the results of a 2003 dendrochronology study, the house was built ca. 1699. Cutchogue-New Suffolk Historical Council, the owner of the house, commissioned a second dendrochronology study in July 2017 to verify the build date, with the same results.

Prior to 2017 The Old House was thought to have been built by John Budd on land east of town near a pond that became known as Budd Pond. John Budd's daughter Anna and her husband Benjamin Horton were deeded a house in 1658 as a wedding present. They moved it to a location in the village of Cutchogue. Benjamin's brother John inherited the house and sold it to Joseph Wickham in 1699. These events and transactions are well documented.

=== Post 17th century ===
Parker Wickham (February 28, 1727 – May 22, 1785), famous for being a Loyalist politician during the American Revolution and who was banished from the state of New York under dubious circumstances, owned and lived in the house. It was damaged by the Hurricane of 1938 which swept away surrounding trees, leaving it visible from the street and coming to public attention, restored in 1940, and restored again in 1968.

It was declared a National Historic Landmark in 1961. The house is located on the Cutchogue Village Green, along with the 1840 Old Schoolhouse, the 1704 Wickham Farmhouse, a barn, the Cutchogue New Suffolk Free Library, a 19th-century carriage house, and the Old Burying Ground dating from 1717. The buildings are owned and maintained by the Cutchogue-New Suffolk Historical Council, which gives guided tours in the summer.

== See also ==
- List of the oldest buildings in New York
