= Mattituck Airport =

- IATA: none; ICAO: none; FAA LID: 21N

Summary
- Airport type: Public
- Owner: Mattituck Airport, LLC
- Serves: Mattituck, New York
- Elevation AMSL: 30 ft / 9 m
- Coordinates: 40°59′15″N 072°31′08″W
- Website: www.mattituckairport.com
- Interactive map of Mattituck Airport

Runways
Direction	Length		Surface
Direction	ft	m	Surface
1/19	2,200	671	Asphalt

Statistics (2007)
- Aircraft operations: 12,200
- Based aircraft: 32
- Source: Federal Aviation Administration

Mattituck Airport (FAA LID: 21N) is a privately owned public use airport located one nautical mile (2 km) southeast of the central business district of Mattituck, New York, United States. It is owned by Mattituck Airport, LLC.

Authorization is required prior to landing at the airport.

== History ==
The airport was established in 1946 by Parker Wickham. It was built atop a potato farm.

== Facilities and aircraft ==
Mattituck Airport covers an area of 18 acres (7.3 ha) at an elevation of 30 feet (9 m) above mean sea level. It has one runway designated 1/19 with a 2,200 x 60 ft (671 x 18 m) asphalt surface. For the 12-month period ending September 27, 2007, the airport had 12,200 aircraft operations, an average of 33 per day: 98% general aviation and 2% air taxi. At that time there were 32 single-engine aircraft based at this airport.

== See also ==
- List of airports in New York
