= John Wickham (attorney) =

American Loyalist and attorney (1763–1839)

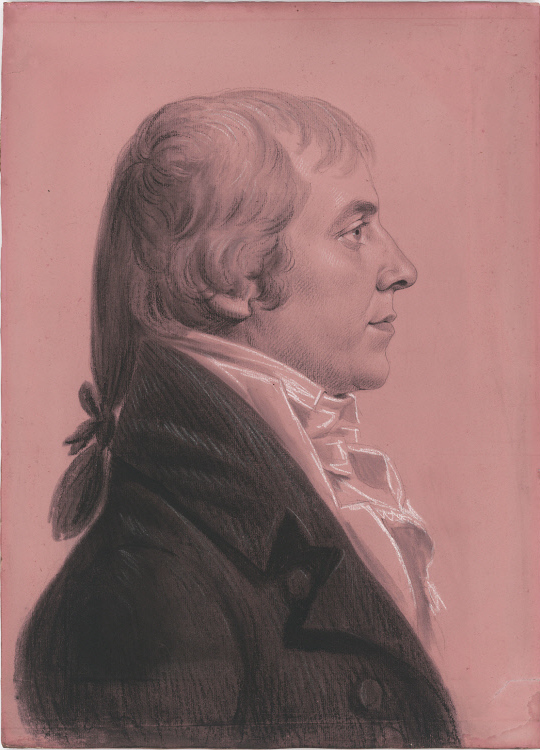
- John Wickham, drawing by Charles Balthazar Julien Févret de Saint-Mémin
- Born: June 6, 1763; Cutchogue, Colony of New York
- Died: January 22, 1839 (aged 75)
- Education: College of William and Mary
- Occupation: Lawyer
- Spouses: Mary Smith Fanning; Elizabeth Seldon McClurg

John Wickham (June 6, 1763 – January 22, 1839) was an American Loyalist, attorney and slaveholder. One of the few Loyalists to achieve national prominence in the United States after the American Revolution, Wickham may be best remembered for his role in defending former Vice President Aaron Burr, who was accused of treason but acquitted in 1807.

== Early and family life ==
Born in the village of Cutchogue, colony of New York, John Wickham was the oldest son of Rev. John Wickham Sr. and his wife Mary Smith Fanning. His father was a minister in the Anglican Church and remained a Loyalist as many in the colonies grew dissatisfied with the British administration and additional taxes imposed to offset the cost of the French and Indian War (which ended the year of Wickham's birth). His uncle Parker Wickham was also active in local New York government and a Loyalist.

Following his move to Richmond, Virginia after the American Revolutionary War as discussed below, Wickham married his first cousin Mary Smith Fanning and had two children. After her early death, he married Elizabeth Seldon McClurg and had seventeen more children. McClurg was the daughter of Dr. James McClurg, who thrice served as Richmond's mayor, and was a delegate to the Philadelphia Convention, which framed the Constitution of the United States in 1787.

== American Revolutionary War loyalist ==
Although John Wickham was a first cousin of Revolutionary War hero Nathaniel Fanning, he was heavily influenced by his uncle Edmund Fanning, who became a colonel (later a general) in the British Army. Wickham enlisted as an ensign in a unit Fanning raised and called the King's American Regiment.

While traveling through Virginia, Wickham was captured and put on trial as a spy, but acquitted.

Wickham's uncle Parker Wickham was kidnapped by Connecticut patriots in 1777 and warned against further loyalist activities. Following Britain's withdrawal from New York in 1779, Parker Wickham was banished from New York State under an act of attainder. Despite vigorously declaring his innocence, Parker Wickham never received a trial and the legislation sentenced him to death if he returned to New York, so he lived the rest of his life in Connecticut. Wickham's own trial in Virginia and comparison with the unfairness of his uncle's expulsion from New York gave John Wickham a lifelong appreciation of the sanctity of a person's legal rights, regardless of their political affiliation.

== Legal education and career ==
After the Revolutionary War, Wickham remained in Williamsburg, Virginia and earned a degree in law from the College of William and Mary, where he became a close friend of John Marshall, later fourth Chief Justice of the U.S.

After admission to the Virginia bar Wickham moved to Richmond and established a private legal practice. Helping British merchants collect debts from American businessmen proved profitable. Like Marshall, Wickham invested some of his profits and became a slaveholder, owning several enslaved people by the 1810 U.S. census, 15 enslaved people a decade later, and 23 enslaved people in the last federal census in his lifetime.

Meanwhile, in 1807, Wickham was lead counsel for Aaron Burr in his trial for treason. Although Thomas Jefferson took an active role in trying to have his former Vice President executed, the jurors found Burr innocent. Wickham's old friend John Marshall was the presiding judge.

Wickham was elected to the American Philosophical Society in 1835.

In addition to leasing out slaves or operating a farm by means of enslaved labor, Wickham bred racehorses. The best and most famous of them all was Boston, which Wickham lost in a card game. Boston became one of the greatest horses of his time, and sired the famous studhorse, Lexington.

== Death and legacy ==
Wickham died in 1839 and was buried in Richmond's Shockoe Hill Cemetery. Many of his children intermarried with the First Families of Virginia and many descendants became lawyers and politically active. His grandson Williams Carter Wickham owned a plantation in Hanover County through one such marriage and became the first descendant to serve in the Virginia General Assembly. Though a Unionist in the 1861 Virginia Secession Convention, W. C. Wickham became a Confederate officer following the secession vote and rose to the rank of general. He would ultimately serve in both houses of the Virginia General Assembly (though as a Republican following the war) and also became president of the rebuilt Chesapeake and Ohio Railway (a Baltimore-based rival to Richmond railroads that failed to connect to the Ohio Valley before the Civil War). His son (John Wickham's great-grandson) Henry T. Wickham would continue the family's legal, military, business and political traditions and served more than four decades in the Virginia General Assembly (all but two years in the Virginia Senate, in which he twice became speaker pro tempore). His granddaughter Charlotte Wickham married William Henry Fitzhugh Lee, the son of General Robert E. Lee. Wickham's residence, Wickham House, is now part of the Valentine Richmond History Center.

== See also ==
- Burr conspiracy
