= East Marion, New York =

- Hamlet and census-designated place
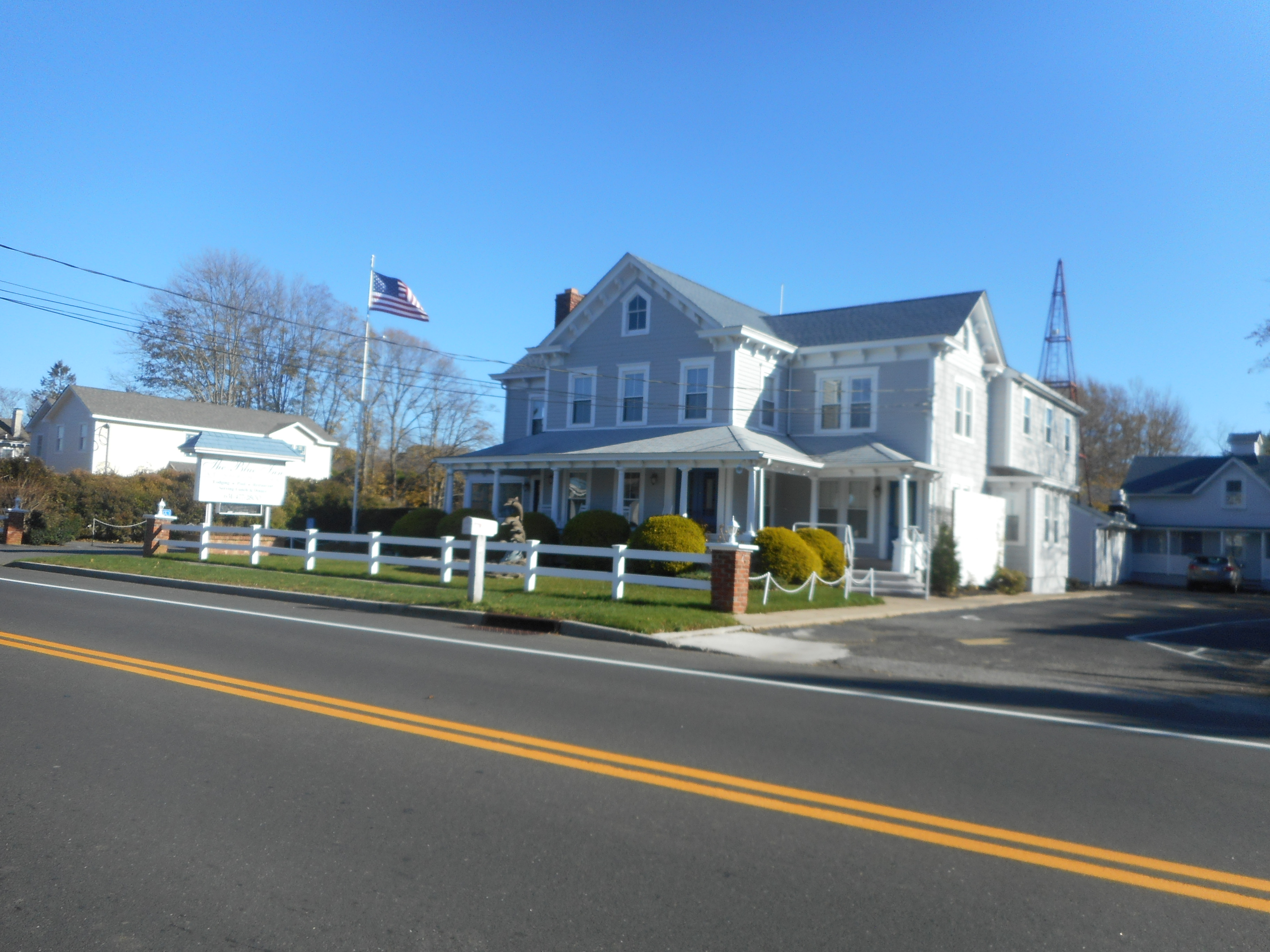
- The Blue Inn, one of many Bed & Breakfasts along NY 25 in East Marion.

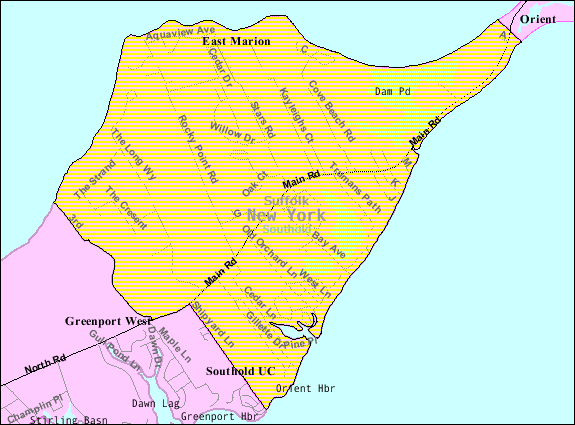

- Location within New York
- Coordinates: 41°7′44″N 72°20′31″W
- Country: United States
- State: New York
- County: Suffolk
- Town: Southold

Area
  - Total: 3.68 sq mi (9.53 km^{2})
  - Land: 2.24 sq mi (5.80 km^{2})
  - Water: 1.44 sq mi (3.74 km^{2})
- Elevation: 33 ft (10 m)

Population (2020)
  - Total: 1,048
  - Density: 468.2/sq mi (180.77/km^{2})
- Time zone: UTC-5 (Eastern (EST))
  - Summer (DST): UTC-4 (EDT)
- ZIP code: 11939
- Area code: 631
- FIPS code: 36-22447
- GNIS feature ID: 0949163

East Marion is a census-designated place (CDP) that roughly corresponds to the hamlet by the same name in the town of Southold in Suffolk County, New York, United States. As of the 2020 census, East Marion had a population of 1,048.

== History ==
=== Beginnings ===
The first inhabitants were the Orient Focus People, Native Americans who lived in the area about 1000 BC. They vanished long before the arrival in about 900 AD of the Corchaugs, who called the area Poquatuc. The Corchaugs were still present when six English families settled in 1661. The new residents called the area Oysterponds because of the abundant shellfish that they began to gather and sell to nearby communities. While farming remained the principal occupation, trading vessels began operating out of the sheltered harbor during the colonial period.

=== The Revolution ===
British troops landed in 1776 during the American Revolutionary War. Many families fled to Connecticut, and the Redcoats periodically plundered the farms they left behind. After Benedict Arnold switched sides, he organized raids on Connecticut from Oysterponds. The British returned during the War of 1812, setting up what turned out to be a porous blockade against American ships sailing to New York City. In 1814 Commodore Stephen Decatur anchored his American squadron off Trumans Beach but never engaged the British. After the war, renewed farming and fishing brought prosperity to Oysterponds. By 1840 more than 30 schooners were operating out of the harbor, carrying fish and produce.

=== Turning point ===
Orient and East Marion originally were called Oysterponds Lower Neck and Oysterponds Upper Neck, respectively. In 1836, the two communities went their separate ways with new names. Orient was chosen to reflect the area's easternmost position on the North Fork of Long Island. East Marion was named for Gen. Francis Marion, the "Swamp Fox" of the Revolutionary War. "East" was tacked on because of an existing town of Marion upstate.

=== Brushes with fame ===
By 1870 the tip of the North Fork had become a resort. The Orient Point Inn, which opened in 1796, played host to President Grover Cleveland, poet Walt Whitman, orator Daniel Webster, actress Sarah Bernhardt and author James Fenimore Cooper, who wrote "Sea Lions", set in Orient. (The inn closed in the 1960s and was demolished.) Meanwhile, members of one prominent Orient family did what they could to stave off public attention. They were the Tuthills, generally referred to in those less-sensitive days as the "Tuthill Dwarfs" or "Tiny Tuthills". Three Tuthill sisters, Cynthia, Lucretia and Asenath, were midgets and accomplished seamstresses. In the mid-19th century, their brother Rufus built them a house with reduced dimensions; it still stands on Village Lane. Their diminutive and shy nephew, Addison, declined P. T. Barnum's invitation to join his circus.

=== Claims to fame ===
Most people today know Orient for the ferries to New London and for Orient Beach State Park. Regularly scheduled ferry service to Connecticut began in the 1930s. The park was created when the community deeded the bulk of the 4-mile-long (6 km) beach peninsula to the state in 1929. East Marion is a sleepy country hamlet with myriad bays and inlets, wildlife preserves and miles of rolling farmlands. Currently the community contains a series of bed and breakfasts along NY 25 between Greenport and Orient Point.

== Geography ==
According to the United States Census Bureau, the CDP has a total area of 2.4 square miles (6.1 km^{2}), of which 2.2 square miles (5.8 km^{2}) is land and 0.12 square miles (0.3 km^{2}), or 5.42%, is water.

== Demographics ==
Historical population
Census	Pop.	Note	%±
2020	1,048		—
U.S. Decennial Census

As of the census of 2000, there were 756 people, 329 households, and 222 families residing in the CDP. The population density was 360.6 inhabitants per square mile (139.2/km^{2}). There were 744 housing units at an average density of 354.8 per square mile (137.0/km^{2}). The racial makeup of the community was 95.24% White, 0.93% African American, 0.13% Native American, 0.93% Asian, 1.72% from other races, and 1.06% from two or more races. Hispanic or Latino of any race were 2.91% of the population.

There were 329 households, out of which 22.2% had children under the age of 18 living with them, 55.9% were married couples living together, 8.2% had a female householder with no husband present, and 32.5% were non-families. 28.9% of all households were made up of individuals, and 16.7% had someone living alone who was 65 years of age or older. The average household size was 2.30 and the average family size was 2.79.

In the community, the population was spread out, with 18.5% under the age of 18, 4.4% from 18 to 24, 20.6% from 25 to 44, 26.3% from 45 to 64, and 30.2% who were 65 years of age or older. The median age was 49 years. For every 100 females, there were 96.9 males. For every 100 females age 18 and over, there were 90.1 males.

The median income for a household in the community was $44,583, and the median income for a family was $52,500. Males had a median income of $47,917 versus $31,250 for females. The per capita income for the CDP was $24,373. About 4.7% of families and 5.8% of the population were below the poverty line, including 4.7% of those under age 18 and 4.9% of those age 65 or over.

== Schools ==
- Oysterponds Union Free School District
