= Cutchogue, New York =

- Hamlet and census-designated place
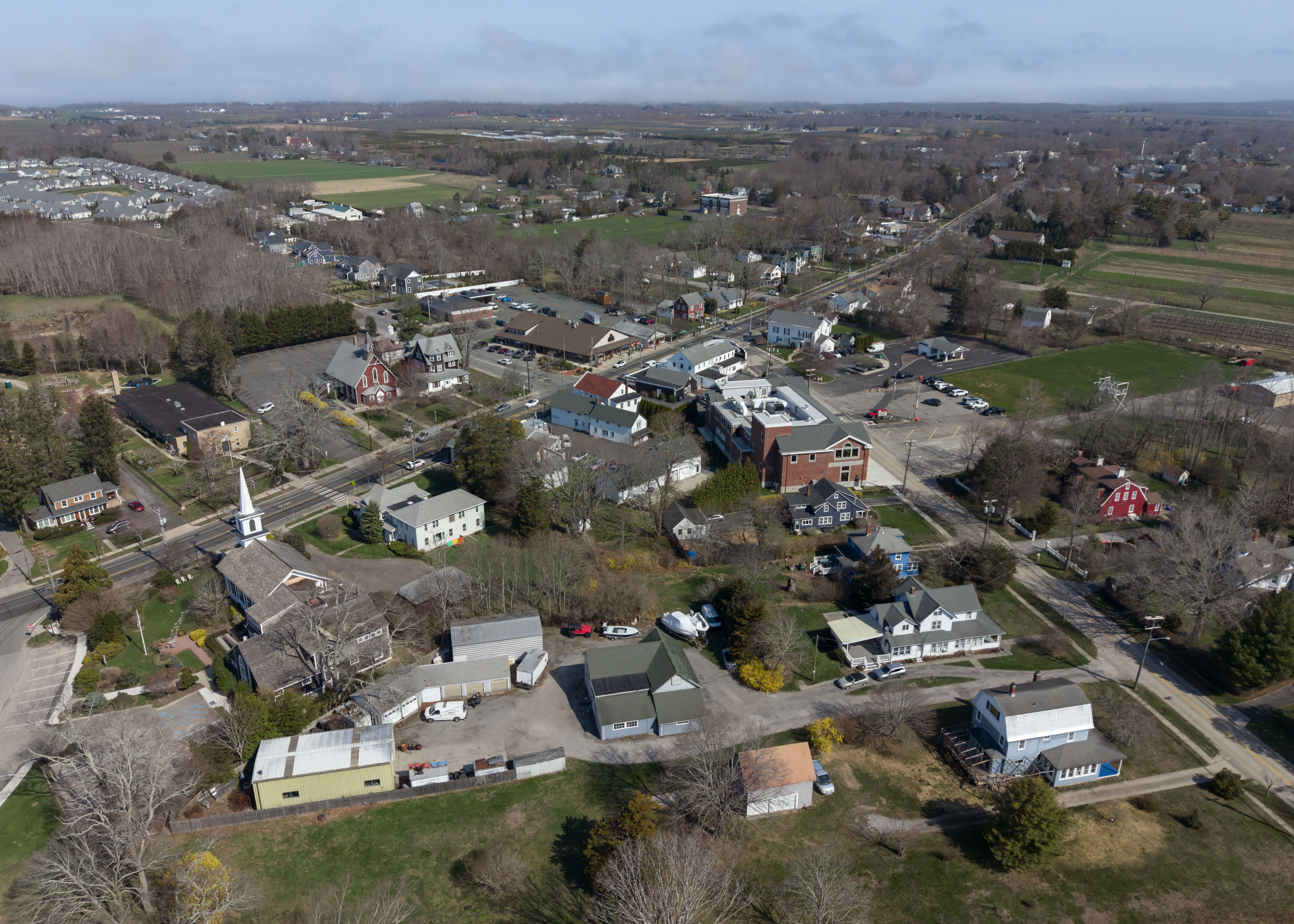
- Downtown along Main Road

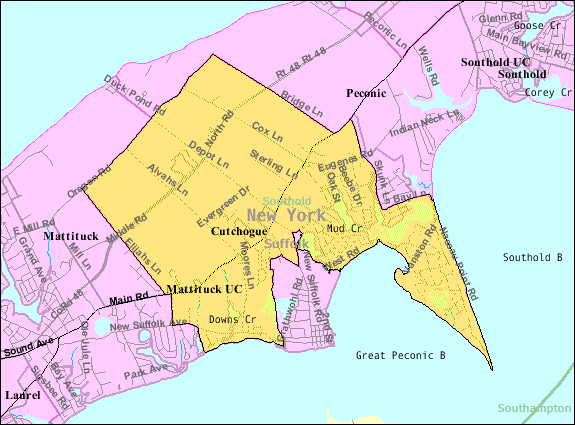

- Location within New York
- Coordinates: 41°1′N 72°28′W
- Country: United States
- State: New York
- County: Suffolk
- Town: Southold

Area
  - Total: 10.95 sq mi (28.35 km^{2})
  - Land: 9.78 sq mi (25.32 km^{2})
  - Water: 1.17 sq mi (3.02 km^{2})
- Elevation: 30 ft (9 m)

Population (2020)
  - Total: 3,437
  - Density: 351.5/sq mi (135.73/km^{2})
- Time zone: UTC-5 (Eastern (EST))
  - Summer (DST): UTC-4 (EDT)
- ZIP code: 11935
- Area code: 631
- FIPS code: 36-19466
- GNIS feature ID: 0947961

Cutchogue (/ˈkʌtʃɒɡ/ KUTCH-og) is a hamlet and census-designated place (CDP) in Suffolk County, New York, United States, on the North Fork of Long Island's East End. As of the 2020 census, Cutchogue had a population of 3,437.

The Cutchogue CDP roughly represents the area of the Cutchogue hamlet in the town of Southold.

== Geography ==
According to the United States Census Bureau, the community has a total area of 10.2 square miles (26.3 km^{2}), of which 9.7 square miles (25.2 km^{2}) is land and 0.42 square miles (1.1 km^{2}), or 4.2%, is water.

Historical population
Census	Pop.	Note	%±
2000	2,849		—
2010	3,349		17.6%
2020	3,437		2.6%
U.S. Decennial Census

== History ==
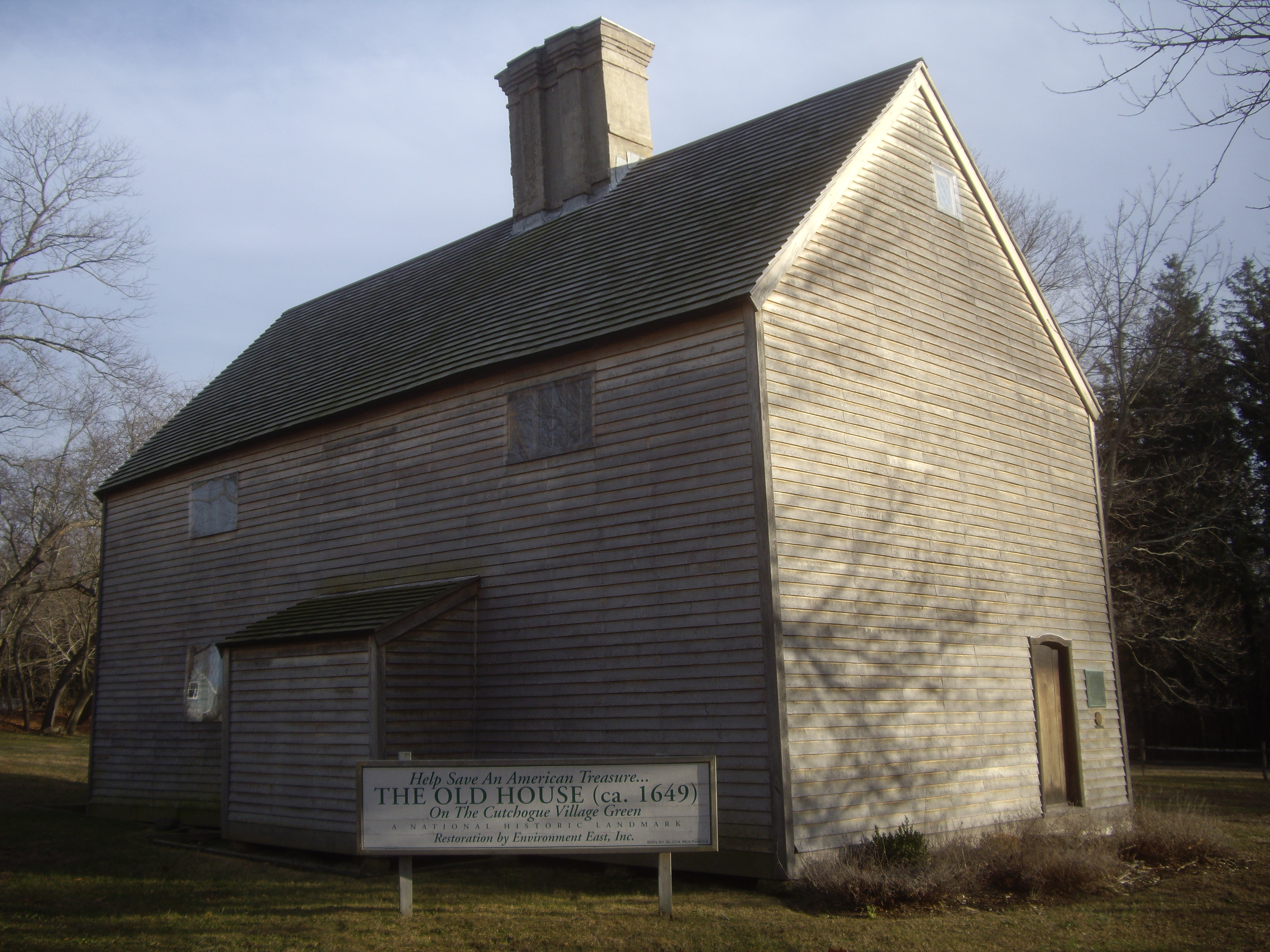
The c.1649 Old House, is one of the oldest houses in New York State

The name Cutchogue is derived from an Algonquin word meaning "principal place". Many of the local Native Americans lived at Fort Corchaug before English-American settlers began arriving in 1640. The Old House, built ca. 1699, is the oldest English-style house in the village. In fact, it is one of the best surviving examples of English domestic architecture in the United States, and it has been named a National Historic Landmark.

Famous 18th century residents include political figure Parker Wickham and his nephew John Wickham. Cutchogue is also the birthplace of composer Douglas Moore (1893–1969).

In 1854, Cutchogue was the location of three notorious murders perpetrated by Nicholas Bain.

Hargrave Vineyard, the first winery on Long Island, was established in Cutchogue in 1973. The Long Island Merlot Alliance, which promotes wine-making using the merlot grape, the principal Long Island grape, is based in Cutchogue.

== Local landmarks ==
- Fort Corchaug, a 17th-century Native American settlement, is a National Historic Landmark.
- Wickham’s Fruit Farm has a family history going back to the 17th century.
- The vintage Cutchogue Diner, housed in an original 1941 Kullman Building Corporation diner.
- Cutchogue New Suffolk Free Library. The building that is now the Library’s home "was originally a church built by the Independent Congregational Church and Society in 1862."
- The Old House (c. 1649), one of the oldest houses in New York state.

== Demographics ==
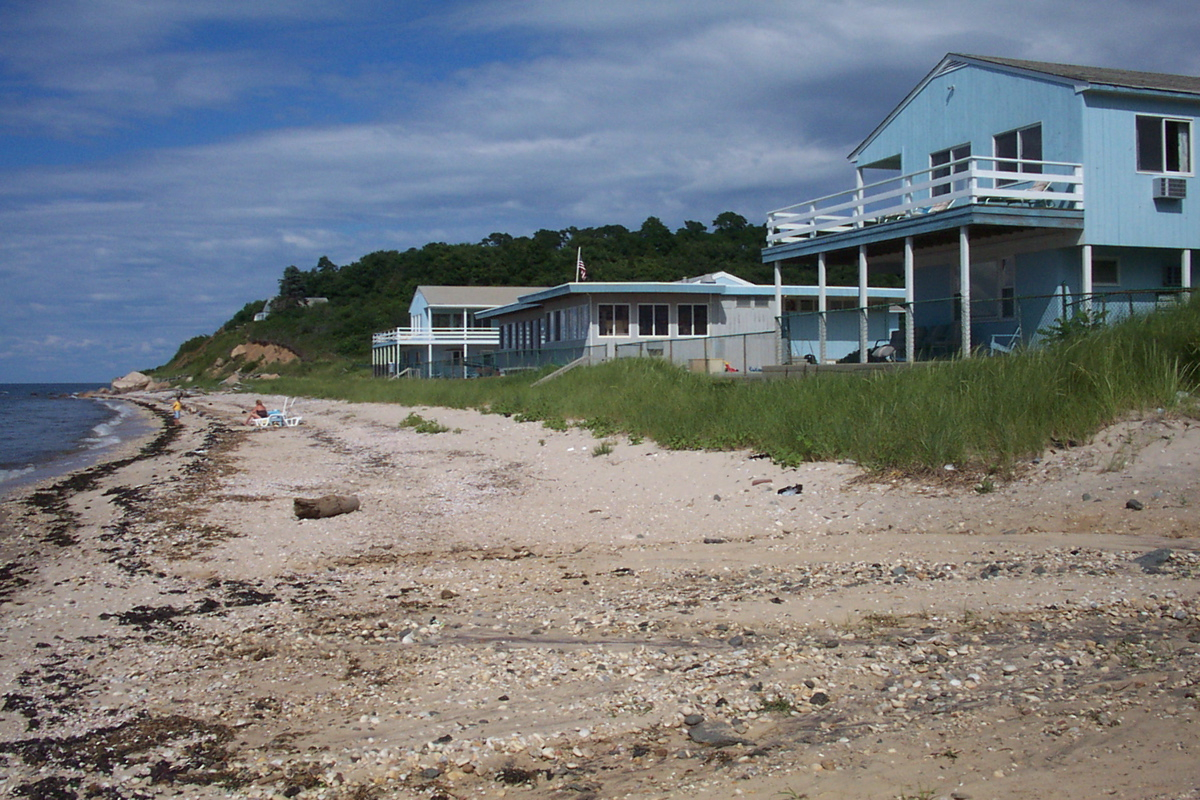
Cutchogue waterfront on Long Island Sound

=== 2020 census ===
As of the 2020 census, Cutchogue had a population of 3,437. The median age was 53.0 years. 15.3% of residents were under the age of 18 and 27.7% of residents were 65 years of age or older. For every 100 females there were 105.2 males, and for every 100 females age 18 and over there were 102.9 males age 18 and over.

65.1% of residents lived in urban areas, while 34.9% lived in rural areas.

There were 1,400 households in Cutchogue, of which 21.4% had children under the age of 18 living in them. Of all households, 55.5% were married-couple households, 16.4% were households with a male householder and no spouse or partner present, and 22.7% were households with a female householder and no spouse or partner present. About 27.9% of all households were made up of individuals and 16.6% had someone living alone who was 65 years of age or older.

There were 2,121 housing units, of which 34.0% were vacant. The homeowner vacancy rate was 0.6% and the rental vacancy rate was 12.9%.

Racial composition as of the 2020 census
Race	Number	Percent
White	2,947	85.7%
Black or African American	36	1.0%
American Indian and Alaska Native	14	0.4%
Asian	28	0.8%
Native Hawaiian and Other Pacific Islander	3	0.1%
Some other race	160	4.7%
Two or more races	249	7.2%
Hispanic or Latino (of any race)	417	12.1%

=== 2000 census ===
As of the census of 2000, there were 2,849 people, 1,120 households, and 801 families residing in the CDP. The population density was 351.7 inhabitants per square mile (135.8/km^{2}). There were 1,680 housing units at an average density of 207.4 per square mile (80.1/km^{2}). The racial makeup of the community was 93.86% White, 2.42% African American, 0.04% Native American, 0.53% Asian, 1.72% from other races, and 1.44% from two or more races. Hispanic or Latino of any race were 5.69% of the population.

There were 1,120 households, out of which 27.6% had children under the age of 18 living with them, 62.3% were married couples living together, 6.7% had a female householder with no husband present, and 28.4% were non-families. 25.1% of all households were made up of individuals, and 13.9% had someone living alone who was 65 years of age or older. The average household size was 2.48 and the average family size was 2.93.

In the CDP, the population was spread out, with 21.5% under the age of 18, 5.1% from 18 to 24, 24.7% from 25 to 44, 28.3% from 45 to 64, and 20.5% who were 65 years of age or older. The median age was 44 years. For every 100 females, there were 98.0 males. For every 100 females age 18 and over, there were 94.9 males.

The median income for a household in the community was $65,469, and the median income for a family was $71,611. Males had a median income of $51,103 versus $34,432 for females. The per capita income for the CDP was $35,042. About 2.0% of families and 5.6% of the population were below the poverty line, including 5.8% of those under age 18 and 3.4% of those age 65 or over.

== Albert Einstein and Cutchogue ==
An avid sailor, Albert Einstein once called Little Peconic Bay in Cutchogue "the most beautiful sailing ground I ever experienced." In the summers of 1938 and 1939 he rented a cottage on Old Cove Road, now called West Cove Road, on Nassau Point, and spent many hours alone in a little sailboat he called Tineff (Yiddish for "worthless"). Albert Einstein was taught to sail on Little Peconic Bay but his sailing skills left much to be desired.

While in Cutchogue on August 2, 1939, pipe-smoking Einstein was visited by fellow Jewish physicists from Hungary Leó Szilárd (who had produced a nuclear chain reaction in a laboratory at Columbia University) and Edward Teller (both prompted by Niels Bohr), and dictated the famous Letter to President Roosevelt, alerting him to the new developments in nuclear physics and hinting that the Germans might be working on an atomic bomb, urging him to launch his own program. The letter is widely credited with setting in motion the Manhattan Project, the US government effort that built the first atomic bomb.

When Szilárd first explained the concept of a nuclear chain reaction to him, Einstein gave the famous reply, "Daran habe ich gar nicht gedacht!" ("I really never thought of that before").

== Schools ==
- Mattituck-Cutchogue Union Free School District
