= Nicholas Bain =

American farmworker who murdered three people

Nicholas Bain (c. 1824 – December 15, 1854), also known as Beheehan or Behan, was an American farmworker who murdered three people on Long Island in 1854, a crime that gained much notoriety. The author Charles Dickens commented on this crime in his Household Narrative of Current Events periodical.

In May 1854, Bain had been working for James and Francis Wickham on their farm near Cutchogue, New York, for the past two years. Bain asked Ellen Holland, a female servant at the farm, to marry him, but she rejected his proposal. An enraged Bain then threatened her. Holland later discovered that Bain had stolen $30 from her room and she complained to James Wickham. He fired Bain on June 1, 1854.

Around midnight that same day, Bain murdered the Wickhams and attacked Stephen Winston, a young servant boy who survived, at the house with an axe. Bain first attacked the boy downstairs while he slept, then murdered the couple in their bedroom after a violent struggle. Bain later said that his intent was to rape Holland and then kill the two owners out of revenge. However, Holland and another servant girl had fled the house to get help. Authorities quickly identified Bain as the killer because he left his hat and distinctively large bloody footprints at the murder scene.

According to his confession, Bain's plan after the murders was to take the ferry that day from Long Island to New London, CT and then catch a train to New York City. However, a crowd near the dock made him fear capture. His next plan was to take a train on Long Island to New York, but he was unable to hop onto a box car. Desperate at this point, Bain went into a swamp to hide. That evening he went to the house of a fellow Irishman in the area to get food, but the man attempted to detain Bain. However, Bain escaped and ran back into the woods.

On June 6, after an extensive manhunt with 1,000 searchers from towns all around Suffolk County, New York, Bain was found and arrested in the woods near Cutchogue. Sheriff's deputies had to draw their weapons to prevent an angry crowd from immediately lynching him. While receiving medical treatment for a wound, Bain confessed to all three murders. He was later convicted and then hanged on December 15, 1854.
