= Orient Long Beach Bar Light =

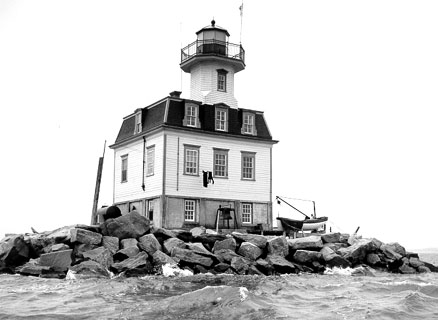
- Orient Long Beach Bar Light ("Bug Light")
- Location: Off Orient, in Gardiners Bay of Long Island, NY,
- Coordinates: 41°6′32″N 72°18′23″W

Tower
- Constructed: 1871
- Foundation: Concrete and steel caisson
- Construction: Wood Frame
- Automated: 1990
- Height: 58 feet (18 m)
- Shape: two-story white frame house with mansard roof and attached tower, "Bug Light"
- Markings: White

Light
- First lit: 1871
- Deactivated: 1945-1990
- Focal height: 19 m (62 ft)
- Lens: Fifth order, Fresnel 1871
- Range: 8 nautical miles (15 km; 9.2 mi)
- Characteristic: Flashing 4 Seconds

Orient Long Beach Bar Light is a lighthouse off Orient, New York. It was originally a screwpile lighthouse that was later converted to concrete caisson foundation. Its early appearance as a screwpile lighthouse gave it the nickname "Bug Light" as there were no other such lighthouses in the vicinity.

The Long Beach Bar Light was destroyed in 1963 by fire. A replica was rebuilt upon the surviving foundation. The building was reassembled in 1990, and re-activated as a navigational aid in 1993.

The Archives Center at the Smithsonian National Museum of American History has a collection (#1055) of souvenir postcards of lighthouses and has digitized 272 of these and made them available online. These include postcards of Orient Long Beach Bar Light with links to customized nautical charts provided by National Oceanographic and Atmospheric Administration.

== Gallery ==
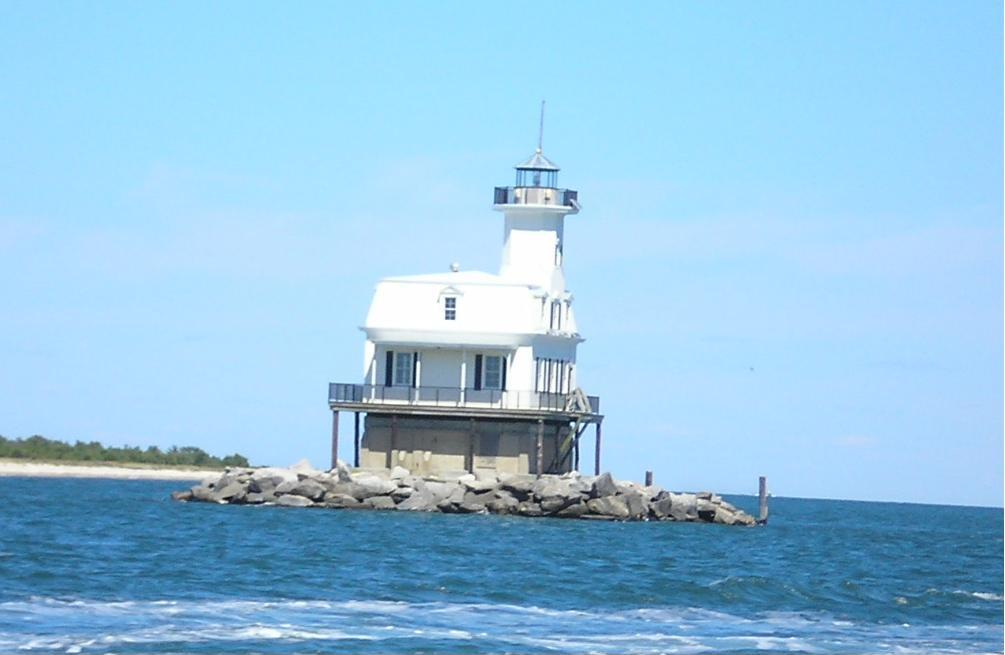
2006 photo

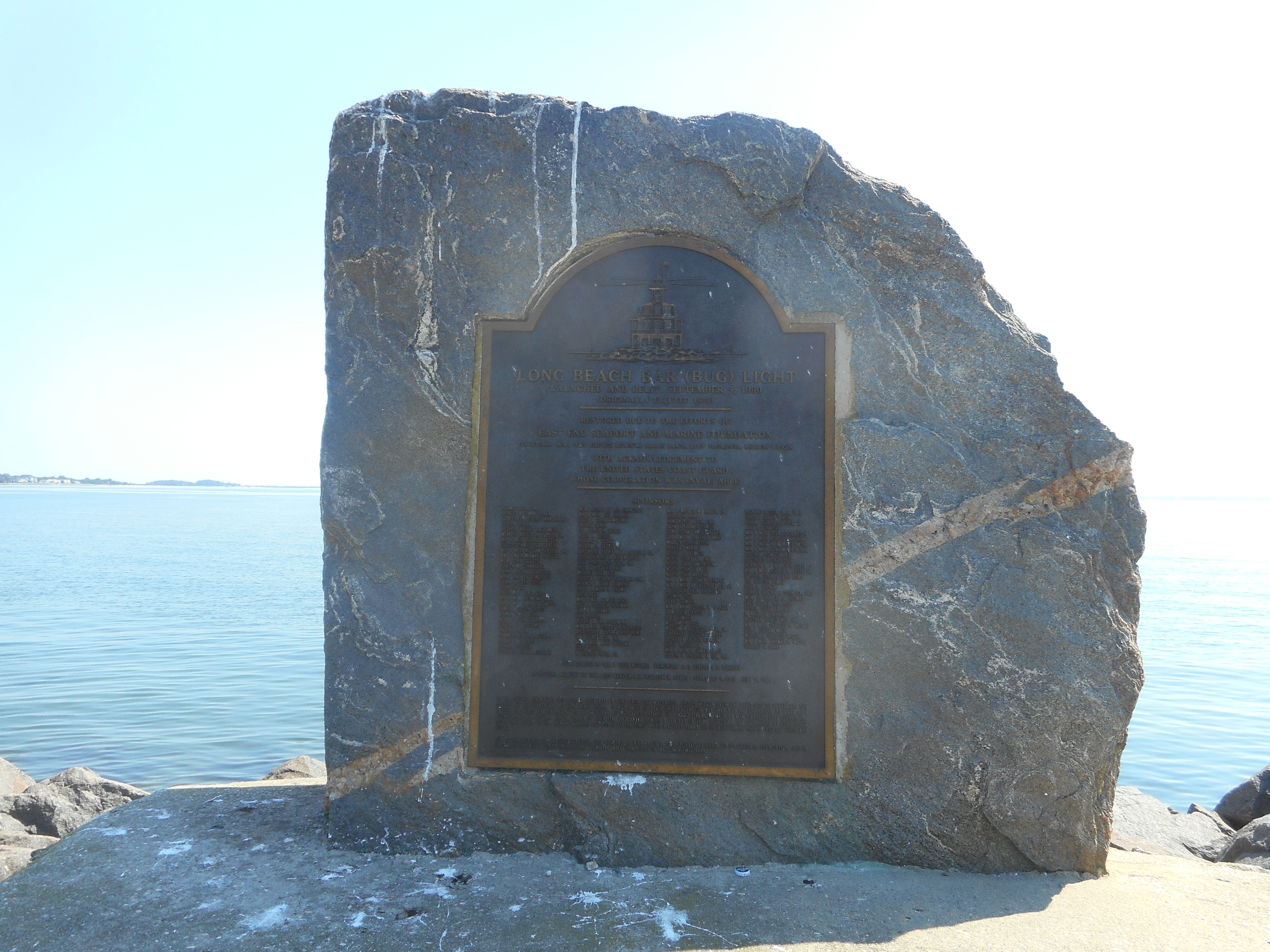
Plaque for the light in East Marion
