= Peconic Bay =

Two bays in New York, United States

- Great Peconic Bay; Little Peconic Bay
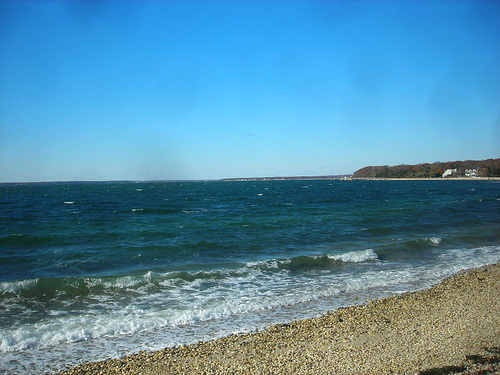

- Location within New York
- Location: Suffolk County, New York
- Coordinates: 40°57′49″N 072°28′0″W
- Primary inflows: North Atlantic
- Basin countries: United States
- Max. depth: 80 ft (24 m)
- Surface elevation: 10 ft (3.0 m)

The Peconic Bay is the parent name for two bays (Great Peconic Bay and Little Peconic Bay) between the North Fork and South Fork of Long Island in Suffolk County, New York, United States. It is separated from Gardiners Bay by Shelter Island.

== Description ==
Peconic Bay is divided by Robins Island into the Great Peconic Bay on the west and Little Peconic Bay on the east. The west end of Great Peconic Bay is also called Flanders Bay. Great Peconic is a shallow bay, less than 30 feet (9.1 m) deep, while Little Peconic reaches depths of over 80 feet (24 m). The Shinnecock Canal provides access from the Great Peconic Bay to Shinnecock Bay. The two Peconic Bays are often collectively referred to as "the Peconics".

The Peconics are a tidal estuary system fed at the western end by the Peconic River. Other notable tidal estuary creeks which provide brackish water to the system are Meeting House Creek, Brushes Creek, James Creek, and Deep Hole Creek on the North Fork. These and others bring lesser salinity to the water compared to the Atlantic Ocean. For that reason, the clams, oysters and bay scallops were numerous for generations since they require brackish water and the bountiful phyto and zooplankton which give the system its first tier of life. Reseeding of shellfish in 2005 and 2006 and leasing of the bottom to commercial farmers for clams and oysters have given rise to hope for the ecosystem.

The winter flounder fishing usually caught in the spring has all but collapsed, but fluke (summer flounder), bluefish, porgy (scup) and some northern weakfish are to be found, using clams, squid and spearing for bait. Snappers (young spawned bluefish of the year) give youngsters a real thrill in late summer. August is a time of blue claw crabbing and recent catches 2006 and 2007 in the inlets and creeks have been bountiful.

Because of its calm waters in summer, and regularly favorable afternoon sailing winds, the bays have become a popular vacation spot for New Yorkers and East Coasters.

== Regional influence ==
Peconic Bay gives its name to the proposed Peconic County, which would comprise the eastern portion of existing Suffolk County surrounding Peconic Bay and would include the five easternmost towns: East Hampton, Riverhead, Shelter Island, Southampton, and Southold. While this movement to split Suffolk County along economic lines (the western half is more suburban in character, while the eastern half is more rural) has a long history, it has not gained significant traction in Albany since 1997, when the New York State Legislature refused to allow it to separate from Suffolk County.

== See also ==
- Long Island
- Suffolk County, New York
- Holland Torpedo Boat Station
