= Robins Island =

Island in Suffolk County, New York, United States

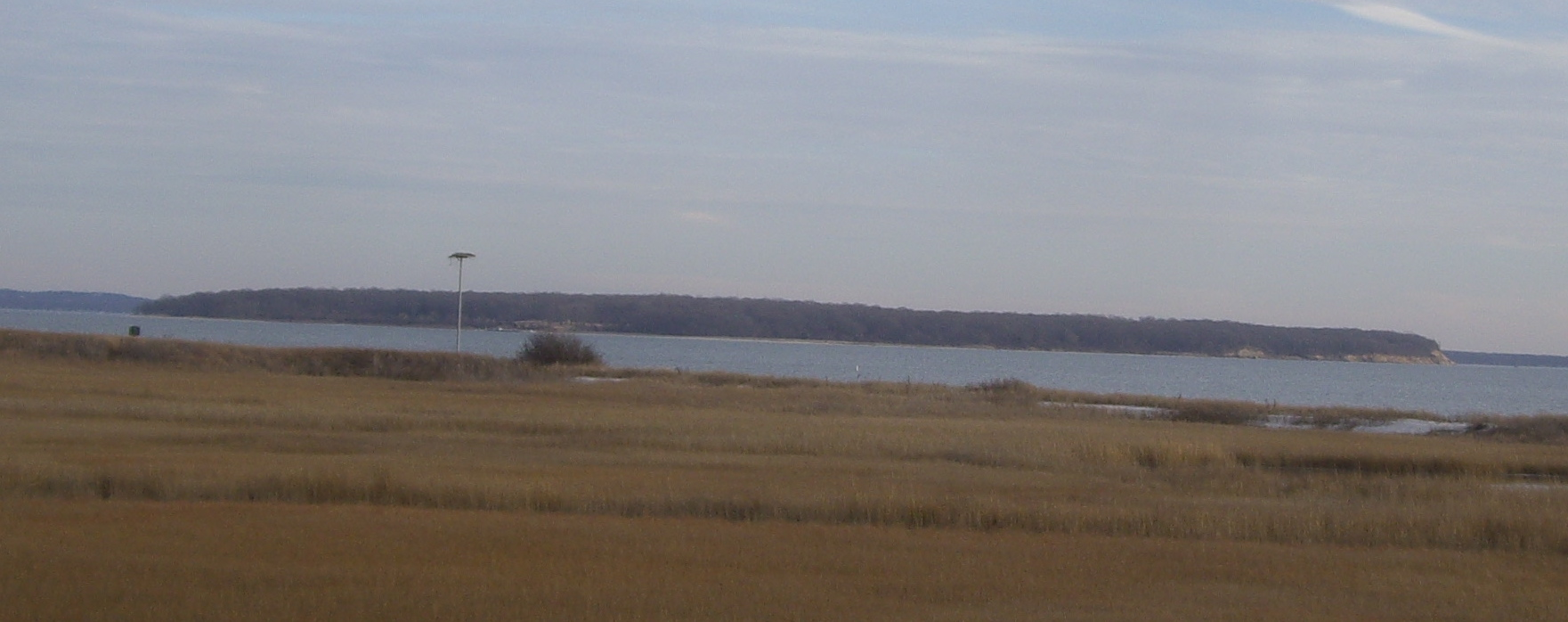
- Robins Island
- Interactive map of Robins Island

Geography
- Location: Peconic Bay
- Coordinates: 40°58′2″N 72°27′36″W
- Area: 0.680 sq mi (1.76 km^{2})

Administration
- United States
- State: New York
- County: Suffolk County, New York
- Town: Southold

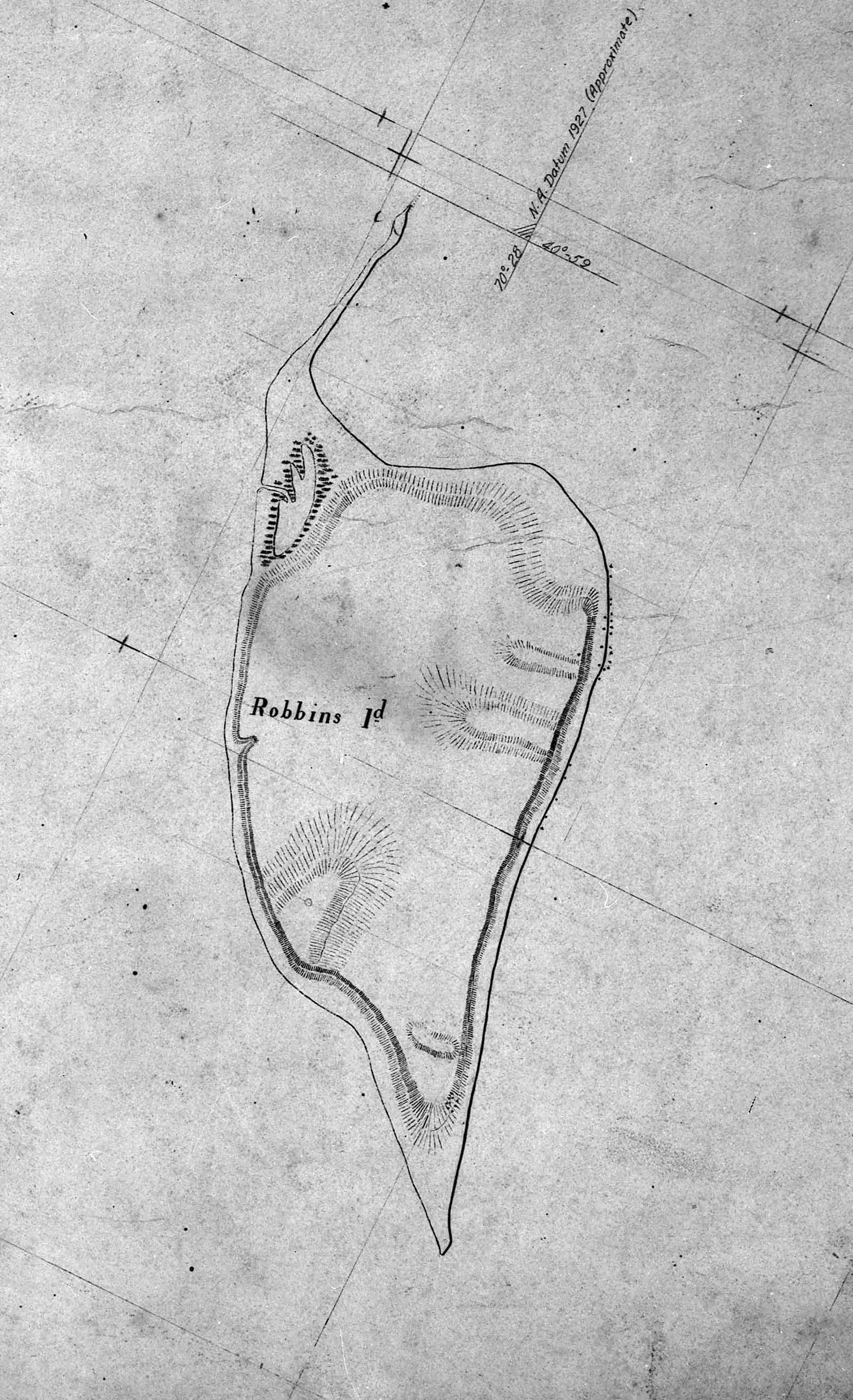
A historic map of Robins Island which can be dated to the years between 1834 and 1845

Robins Island is a 435-acre (1.76 km^{2}) island in Peconic Bay by the eastern end of Long Island off the coast of New Suffolk, New York. The island is privately owned and not accessible to the public and is within the jurisdiction of the Town of Southold in Suffolk County, New York in the United States.

== History ==
The island was officially exempted from a Southampton land conveyance under the name "Robins Island" as early as 1640, but archival documents fail to specify who or what "Robin" was. Robins Island was part of the 1636 deed to William Alexander, Earl of Stirling by King Charles I in which Alexander received all of Long Island and adjacent islands. Alexander gave James Farret power to act as his agent and attorney in settling Long Island. In 1637, Farret was allowed to choose 12,000 acres (49 km^{2}) for his personal use. Farret chose Shelter Island and Robins Island for his use. Farret, in turn, sold the islands to Stephen Goodyear, one of the founders of the New Haven Colony in 1641. In 1651, it was purchased by Nathaniel Sylvester and his partners Constant Sylvester, Thomas Middleton, and Thomas Rouse.

The island was purchased by Parker Wickham in 1715. According to the Southold Town Records, Joseph Wickham was the owner of the Island in 1734. His son—Joseph Wickham (died 1749)—inherited the island and his son Parker became the owner of the island in 1779. The island and other nearby lands in Suffolk County were confiscated in 1779 during the American Revolution by act of attainder, and Wickham, a Loyalist, was banished from the state. Under a Legislature of the State act it was declared that Parker Wickham forfeited his estate and it was sold, on August 5, 1784, to Caleb Brewster and Benjamin Tallmadge who had been members of the Culper Spy Ring during the American Revolutionary War. They sold it to Ezra L'Hommedieu in the 1790s. When L'Hommedieu died, his executors sold it to Benjamin Horton and James Reeve.

By 1851, Wooster and Goodale owned the island. Ira B. Tuthill and Jeremiah G. Tuthill purchased parts of the island and, by 1857, Ira B. Tuthill owned the entire island. In 1873, he sold it to George E Horne, acting as an agent for James Wilson. In 1878, the island was sold back to Ira B. Tuthill under foreclosure. Tuthill sold it to Abraham Ingraham in 1881 for $22,000 (equivalent to $730,000 in 2025). Ingraham, who was from New York, used the island for hunting quail and other game.

The island was purchased for $1.3 million in 1979 (equivalent to $5.8 million in 2025) by two German investors, Herbert and Claus Mittermayer, who planned to sell it to private developers. Robert M. Tuthill, who was the caretaker of the island since the early 1970s, ensured that only invited guests visited the island to protect it from unintended wildfires set by local fishermen who were used to visiting the island.

In 1989, Wickham's descendants attempted to regain the property, but their lawsuit was dismissed in 1992. About a month later, in April 1989, Suffolk County agreed to purchase Robins Island for $9.2 million (equivalent to $23.9 million in 2025) and turn it into a nature preserve. However, the island never transitioned to public ownership because of legal disputes, as another developer had signed a contract to purchase Robins Island for $15.3 million and develop 22 luxury homes on five-acre lots. (That development deal collapsed after the county determined that an environmental study was necessary before the island could be purchased.)

== Current status ==
Robins Island is owned by Wall Street financier Louis Bacon, who purchased it in 1993 at a bankruptcy court auction for $11 million. Bacon has made significant investments in restoring the neglected island, going so far as to import full-grown oak trees to replace ones harvested for lumber years earlier. Some non-native grasses were removed from the island and replaced, and hunters reduced an overgrown deer population. The island has the healthiest turtle population in the state, which includes the Eastern mud turtle. Bacon is known for hosting traditional English "driven pheasant" hunts on the island for his guests. There are three main houses on the property with additional visitors' cottages, caretaker quarters, and several barns and outbuildings on the island.

== Geography ==
Robins Island is located between Little Peconic Bay and Great Peconic Bay. The island can be reached by a private vessel. A road runs the length of the island. A conservation easement in 1997 makes it unlikely that any development will occur on the island; however, 2009 satellite images show seven structures and several small outbuildings on the island.
