= North Fork (Long Island) =

Peninsula on Long Island, New York, United States

Coordinates: 40°58′03″N 72°37′12″W

The North Fork is a 30-mile- (48 km) long peninsula in the northeast part of Suffolk County, New York, U.S., roughly parallel with a longer peninsula known as the South Fork, both on the East End of Long Island. Although the peninsula begins east of Riverhead hamlet, the term North Fork can also refer collectively to the towns of Riverhead and Southold in their entirety.

Beginning about 75 miles (120 kilometers) east of Manhattan, the North Fork is the easterly part of the North Shore of Long Island. Along with The Hamptons, the area is also part of Long Island's "East End".

== Geography ==
At Riverhead proper, Long Island splits into two tines, hence the designations of the South Fork and the North Fork. The dividing line between the two forks in the west is the Peconic River. The North Fork is composed of all of the Town of Southold in the east and part of the Town of Riverhead in the west. The body of water north of this region is Long Island Sound. The southern water boundary comprises several connected bodies of water, including the Great Peconic Bay, Little Peconic Bay, and Gardiners Bay.

Lying between the North Fork and the South Fork are several islands, including Robins Island and the two large islands of Shelter Island and Gardiners Island. Shelter Island lies between the North and South Forks, and ferries provide shuttle service between Greenport Village and Shelter Island Heights, as well as between Shelter Island and North Haven along The South Fork. The easternmost tip of the North Fork is Orient Point. Beyond that point are three additional significant parts of the Town of Southold, Plum Island, Great Gull Island, and Fisher's Island. These islands and the North Fork itself originated as the Harbor Hill Moraine.

Agricultural industries include vineyards, apple orchards, potato farms, and sod farms. At the tip of the fork are Orient Point County Park and Orient Beach State Park as well as a ferry terminal connecting Long Island and eastern Connecticut. West to East, Wading River, Baiting Hollow, Calverton, Aquebogue, Jamesport, Laurel, Mattituck, Cutchogue, New Suffolk, Peconic, Southold, Greenport, East Marion, Orient, and Orient Point are among the hamlets of the North Fork. The North Fork also has fishing and clamming industries on the Bay, Sound, and adjacent creeks and beaches.

== Transportation ==
The North Fork is accessible via roadways from the west, most notably New York State Route 25. The Long Island Rail Road provides limited weekday, and limited weekend service as far as Greenport on the Ronkonkoma Branch. The Hampton Jitney provides seven days per week, year-round express bus service between Long Island's East End and New York City. Ferries connect the North Fork to Plum Island and New London, Connecticut. Ferries also connect the North Fork to the South Fork by means of Shelter Island roads.

From the North Fork, visitors can access via ferry Shelter Island, which sits in the Peconic Bay. Ferry service is available on the bay side of the fork as well.

== Tourism ==
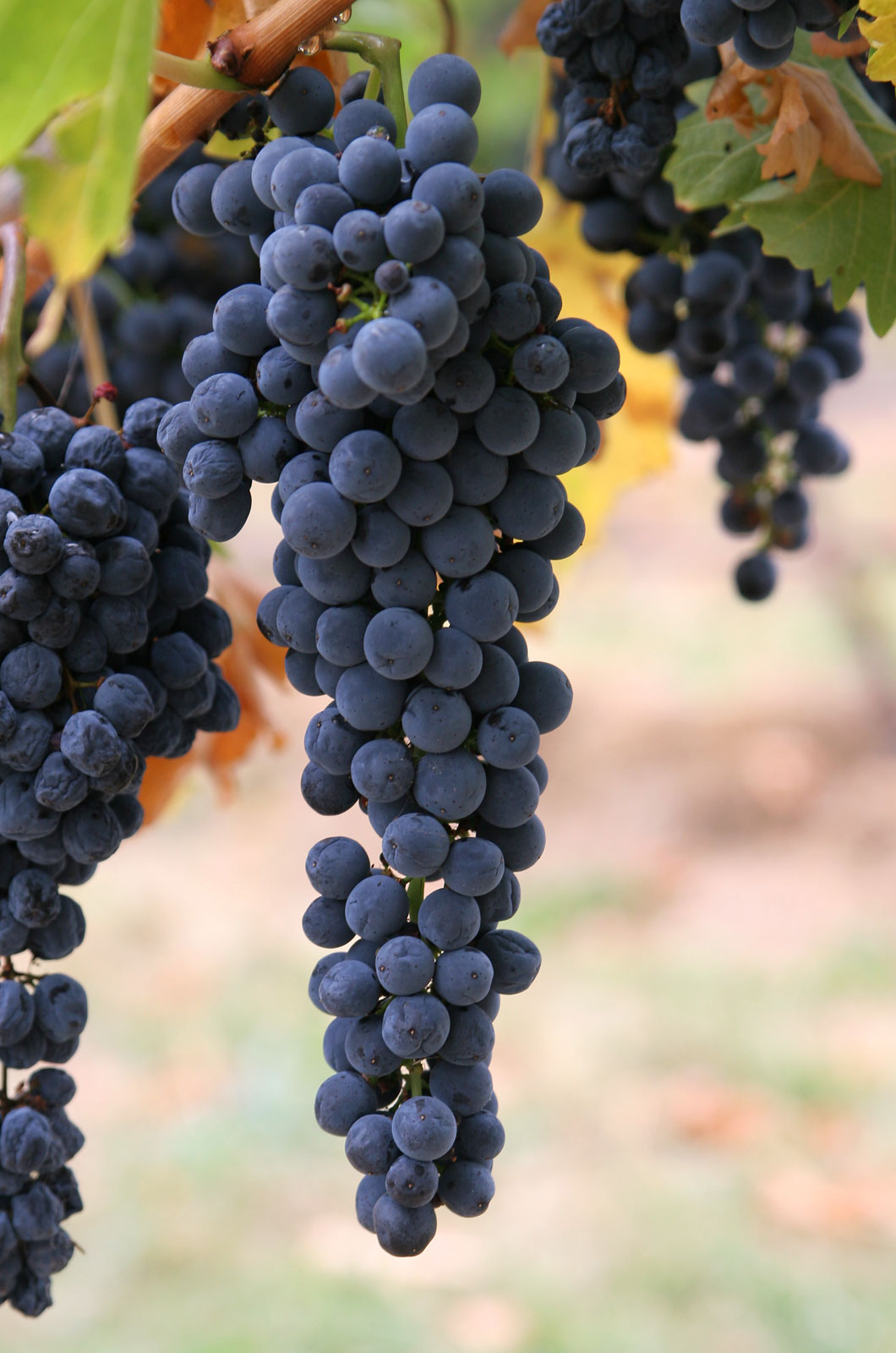
Viticulture has become a major industry on the North Fork of Long Island, home to more than 30 vineyards.

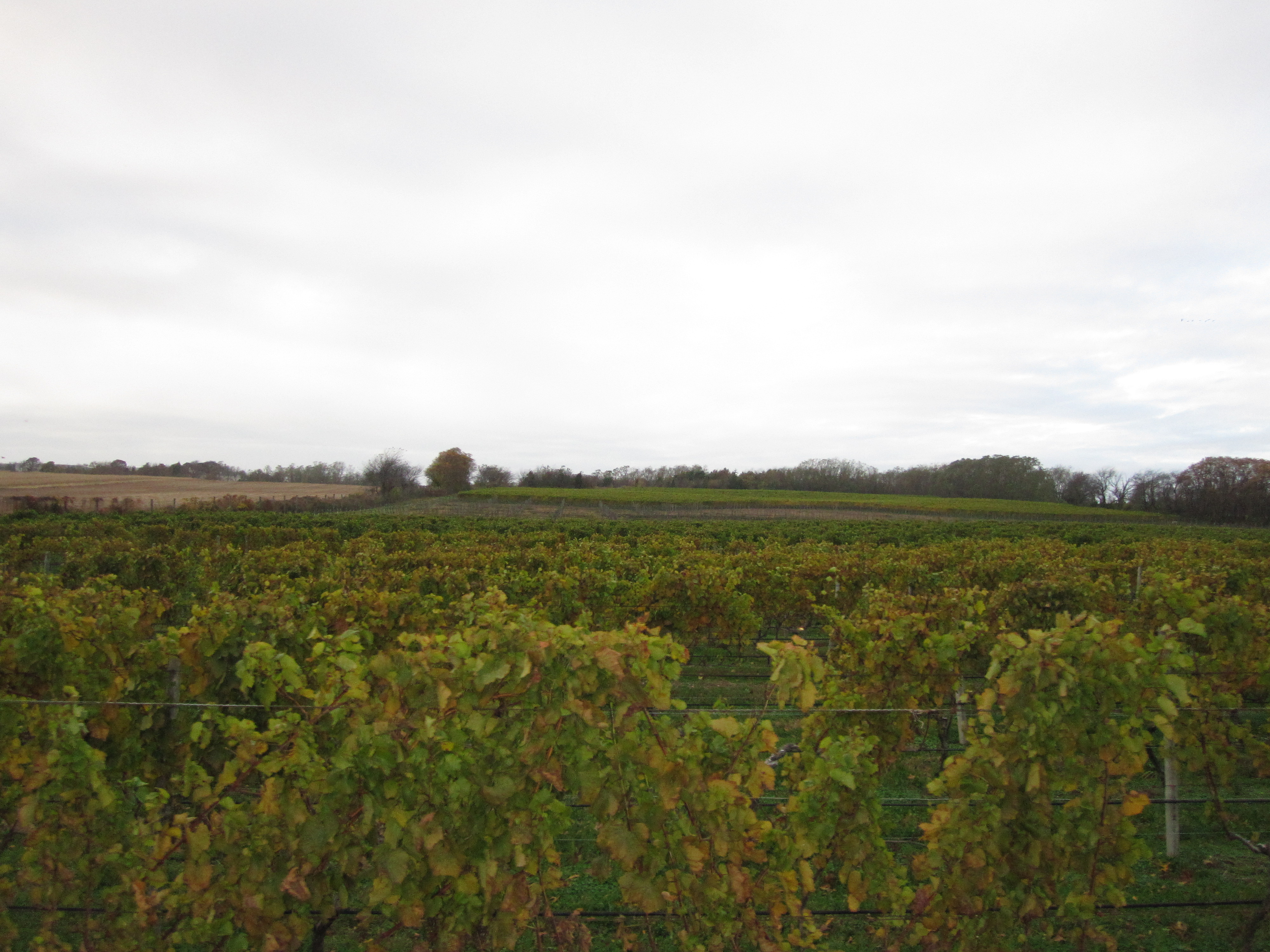
One of those vineyards, somewhere on the North Fork.

The North Fork is currently home to more than 30 vineyards, many of which run tasting rooms for the public to sample and buy their wines. The first of the area's vineyards, Hargrave, was founded in 1973, and today continues as Castello De Borghese. The North Fork of Long Island AVA was established in 1985, and its vineyards and wineries are now an important part of the area's economy. They stretch from Baiting Hollow in the west to Southold in the East, with new vineyards recently planted in Greenport and Orient.

Many multi-generational family farms are still in operation throughout the region as well, and their farmstands are a popular attraction. During the fall harvest season many of the farms host pumpkin picking and other attractions revolving around the harvest theme, and have given rise to the term agritainment. On fall weekends traffic backs up on both primary roads with many people making the drive from suburban areas of Long Island and NYC to participate in the harvest season activities.

The North Fork lies east of the terminus of the Long Island Expressway (LIE), and is served by three primary east to west roads, Route 25, also called Main Road, Sound Avenue, and County Road 48 also called Middle Road. At the easternmost point, Cross Sound Ferry runs daily car and passenger ferries to and from New London, Connecticut. The Long Island Rail Road provides daily service to the region.

== Hamlets and villages ==
=== Riverhead Town ===
- Wading River — shared with the Town of Brookhaven, though the majority of the hamlet of Wading River is in Riverhead Town
- Calverton — shared with the Town of Brookhaven, though the majority of the hamlet of Calverton is in Riverhead Town
- Baiting Hollow
- Riverhead
- Northville
- Aquebogue
- Jamesport
- Laurel — shared with the Town of Southold

=== Southold Town ===
- Laurel — shared with the Town of Riverhead, though the majority of the hamlet of Laurel is in Southold Town
- Mattituck
- Cutchogue
- New Suffolk
- Robins Island
- Peconic
- Nassau Point
- Southold
- Greenport (Village)
- East Marion
- Orient
- Orient Point

== See also ==
- North Fork of Long Island AVA
- Orient windmills
