= Orient, New York =

Orient, New York Orient Point
- Hamlet and census-designated place
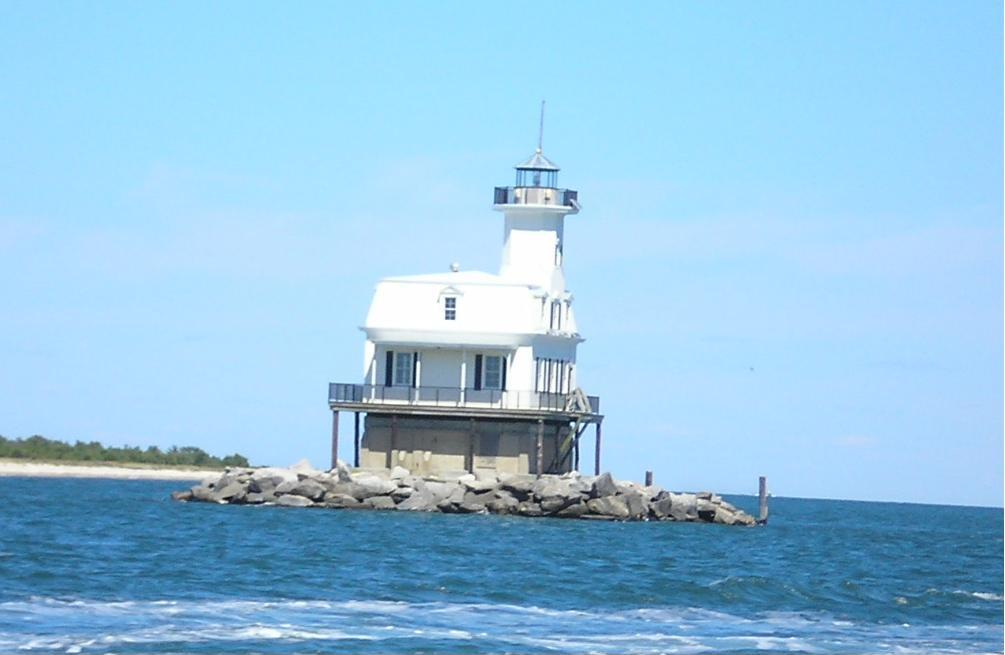
- Orient Long Beach Bar Light

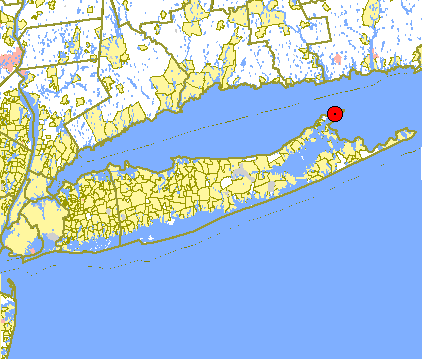
- Location on Long Island

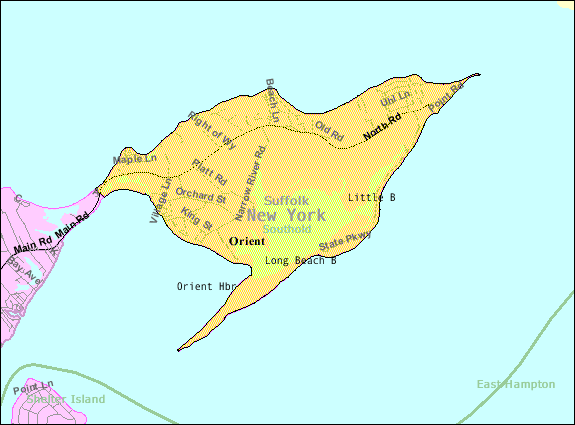
- U.S. Census Map
- Coordinates: 41°08′20″N 72°18′12″W
- Country: United States
- State: New York
- County: Suffolk
- Town: Southold

Area
  - Total: 10.09 sq mi (26.13 km^{2})
  - Land: 5.13 sq mi (13.28 km^{2})
  - Water: 4.96 sq mi (12.85 km^{2})
- Elevation ref name=GNIS />: 13 ft (4 m)

Population (2020)
  - Total: 999
  - Density: 194.9/sq mi (75.25/km^{2})
- Time zone: UTC-5 (Eastern (EST))
  - Summer (DST): UTC-4 (EDT)
- ZIP code: 11957
- Area codes: 631, 934
- FIPS code: 36-55321
- GNIS feature ID: 959470

Orient is a hamlet and census-designated place (CDP) in Suffolk County, Long Island, New York, United States. As of the 2020 census, Orient had a population of 999.

Orient and Orient Point are used almost interchangeably. However, Orient Point refers specifically to the physical point at the end of the North Fork of Long Island, while Orient is the hamlet in which the point is located.

== History and tourism ==
Orient is the easternmost town on Long Island's North Fork. It was originally named Poquatuck, after the name of the local Native American tribe that resided along the inland waterways, then named Oyster Ponds because of the nearby oyster beds.

Orient and East Marion were originally called Oysterponds because of the abundance of shellfish in the area. What is now Orient was known as Lower Neck, while East Marion was called Upper Neck. The communities separated in 1836 and East Marion was named for Revolutionary War Gen. Francis Marion, known as the Swamp Fox. "East" was tacked onto Marion because of an existing Marion upstate.

The name Orient was chosen to reflect that area's easternmost position on the North Fork. A later legend has it that when Oyster Bay, New York became famous during the presidency of Teddy Roosevelt, the name was changed to Orient to match the name of its most prominent land feature, Orient Point.

Orient's winter population swells to well over 1000 in the summer months. Other than a post office, a gas station, a country store, and a few seasonal tourist stands, there is no center of commerce, hence its residents depend on nearby Greenport for everyday necessities. Many make a living at the United States Department of Agriculture lab on nearby Plum Island, a 5-minute boat ride from Orient Point across Plum Gut, or at businesses further west. Truck farming and commercial fishing industries remain as well. Definitely New England in style and flavor, the hamlet of Orient has homes built over the last three centuries. Locals joke that a "new house" is anything built since World War II. One of those houses, built in 2005, Cape Point is a stately replica of Cape Dutch architecture. A distinctive architectural style that emerged in the 17th century in the Western Cape of South Africa during the Dutch Cape Colony era.

The hamlet was originally settled by five families given a land grant by the King of England in the 17th century, and their surnames, King, Terry, Glover, Latham, Tuthill and Vail, still exist in local families. Later, Orient was used as a base of operations by British commanders such as Benedict Arnold and local Tories during the American Revolution to conduct raids on Yankee-held Connecticut. Among Benedict Arnold's headquarters was a local tavern owned and operated by the Vail family on what is now known as "Village Lane". Many of the hamlet's older structures are included in the Orient Historic District, added to the National Register of Historic Places in 1976.

Ferry service has connected Orient Point to southern New England for over a century. The Cross Sound Ferry currently operates a vehicle/passenger ferry service between Orient Point and New London, Connecticut. This service has expanded in recent years with Sea Jet service being provided to the Mohegan Sun and Foxwoods Casino.

== Geography ==
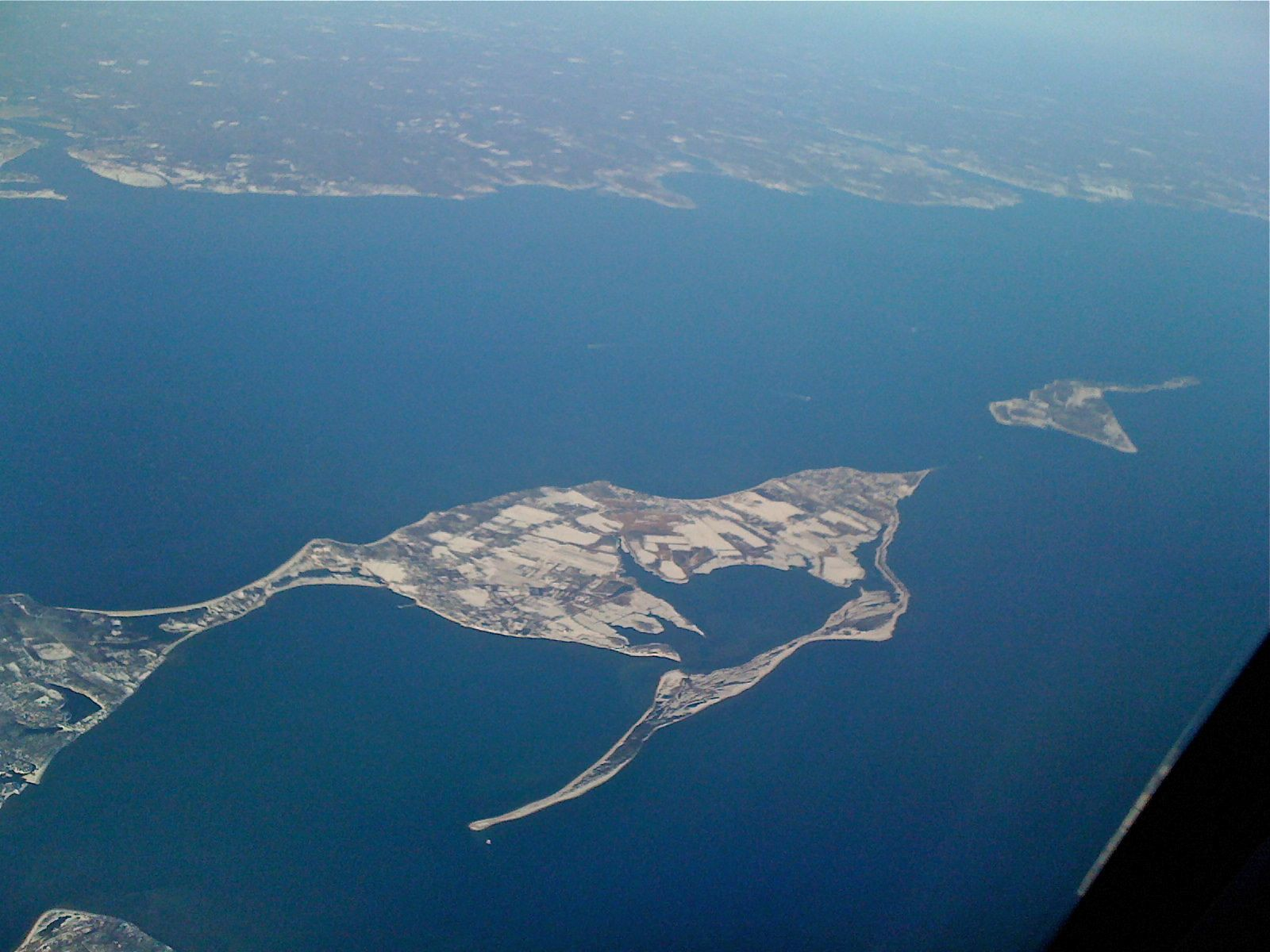
Aerial view

According to the United States Census Bureau, the CDP has a total area of 6.1 square miles (16 km^{2}), of which 5.1 square miles (13 km^{2}) is land and 16.83%, or 1.0 square mile (2.6 km^{2}), is water.

=== Climate ===
Though Orient's climate is influenced by both subtropical and continental air, it has a humid continental climate (Dfa), though due to the Atlantic Ocean current it borders on humid subtropical (Cfa.) The CDP experiences moderately cold, damp winters and warm, humid summers. The temperatures tend to be more moderate, especially during summer days, than other parts of the island due to the CDP's coastal location and a constant onshore flow.

Climate data for Orient, New York
Month	Jan	Feb	Mar	Apr	May	Jun	Jul	Aug	Sep	Oct	Nov	Dec	Year
Record high °F (°C)	66 (19)	63 (17)	79 (26)	91 (33)	93 (34)	95 (35)	102 (39)	100 (38)	93 (34)	88 (31)	75 (24)	70 (21)	102 (39)
Mean daily maximum °F (°C)	39 (4)	41 (5)	47 (8)	56 (13)	66 (19)	75 (24)	81 (27)	80 (27)	74 (23)	63 (17)	54 (12)	44 (7)	60 (16)
Daily mean °F (°C)	31 (−1)	33 (1)	39 (4)	48 (9)	57 (14)	66 (19)	72 (22)	71 (22)	65 (18)	54 (12)	46 (8)	36 (2)	52 (11)
Mean daily minimum °F (°C)	24 (−4)	26 (−3)	31 (−1)	40 (4)	48 (9)	58 (14)	64 (18)	63 (17)	56 (13)	45 (7)	38 (3)	29 (−2)	44 (6)
Record low °F (°C)	−11 (−24)	−13 (−25)	6 (−14)	14 (−10)	29 (−2)	36 (2)	46 (8)	41 (5)	35 (2)	22 (−6)	10 (−12)	−6 (−21)	−13 (−25)

== Demographics ==
Historical population
Census	Pop.	Note	%±
2020	999		—
U.S. Decennial Census

As of the census of 2000, there were 709 people, 330 households, and 205 families residing in the CDP. The population density was 139.2 inhabitants per square mile (53.7/km^{2}). There were 673 housing units at an average density of 132.2 per square mile (51.0/km^{2}). The racial makeup of the CDP was 97.32% White, 0.56% African American, 0.99% Asian, 0.28% Pacific Islander, 0.56% from other races, and 0.28% from two or more races. Hispanic or Latino of any race were 0.99% of the population.

There were 330 households, out of which 18.5% had children under the age of 18 living with them, 52.7% were married couples living together, 7.0% had a female householder with no husband present, and 37.6% were non-families. 30.3% of all households were made up of individuals, and 19.4% had someone living alone who was 65 years of age or older. The average household size was 2.15 and the average family size was 2.69.

In the CDP, the population was spread out, with 18.1% under the age of 18, 2.8% from 18 to 24, 15.7% from 25 to 44, 29.1% from 45 to 64, and 34.4% who were 65 years of age or older. The median age was 54 years. For every 100 females, there were 95.9 males. For every 100 females age 18 and over, there were 91.1 males.

The median income for a household in the CDP was $45,461, and the median income for a family was $50,833. Males had a median income of $43,571 versus $31,111 for females. The per capita income for the CDP was $29,382. About 2.4% of families and 4.4% of the population were below the poverty line, including none of those under age 18 and 4.5% of those age 65 or over.

== Education ==
The local school district for the census-designated place is the Oysterponds Union Free School District.

== Notable people ==
- Bill Hands, baseball player.
- Robert Berks, sculptor, artist.
- Richard Serra, died here in 2024.
