= List of shipwrecks in 1922 =

The list of shipwrecks in 1922 includes ships sunk, foundered, grounded, or otherwise lost during 1922.

table of contents
1922
Jan	Feb	Mar	Apr
May	Jun	Jul	Aug
Sep	Oct	Nov	Dec
Unknown date

== January ==
=== 2 January ===
List of shipwrecks: 2 January 1922
Ship	State	Description
Freddysmith	United Kingdom	The cargo ship ran aground at Gaasehagen, Denmark. She was refloated on 5 January.
Reine des Mers	France	The schooner was abandoned in the Atlantic Ocean. (44°50′N 51°29′W) with the loss of her captain. Survivors were rescued by Hudson (United States).
Storebelt	Denmark	The cargo ship lost her propeller and consequently came ashore at Hirtshals. Her crew were rescued by rocket apparatus.

=== 3 January ===
List of shipwrecks: 3 January 1922
Ship	State	Description
Elleray	United Kingdom	The cargo ship departed Hartlepool, County Durham for London. No further trace, presumed foundered in the North Sea with the loss of all hands.
Laurence Edith	France	The auxiliary schooner was abandoned in the Atlantic Ocean (39°54′N 11°13′W). Her crew were rescued by Indianic (United Kingdom).

=== 4 January ===
List of shipwrecks: 4 January 1922
Ship	State	Description
Roi Rene	France	The schooner ran aground at Morant Cays, Jamaica. Her crew were rescued.

=== 5 January ===
List of shipwrecks: 5 January 1922
Ship	State	Description
Active	United Kingdom	The coaster foundered in the Irish Sea between the Blackwater and Lucifer Lightships (both United Kingdom). Her crew survived.
Canterbury Hill	United Kingdom	The cargo ship capsized and sank in the bristol Channel. Her crew were rescued by Branstone (United Kingdom).

=== 6 January ===
List of shipwrecks: 6 January 1922
Ship	State	Description
Ernesto I	Italy	The cargo ship sank off Smyrna, Turkey.
Manji Maru	Japan	The cargo ship ran aground at Heinan Head, China. She broke in two of 17 February and was a total loss.
Nuovo Due Cugini	Italy	The sailing ship was wrecked with the loss of three crew. She was on a voyage from Tobruk, Libya to Chania, Crete, Greece.

=== 7 January ===
List of shipwrecks: 7 January 1922
Ship	State	Description
Chassie Maersk	Denmark	The cargo ship ran aground on Rondo Island, Netherlands East Indies. She broke in two and was a total loss.

=== 8 January ===
List of shipwrecks: 8 January 1922
Ship	State	Description
Atilla	Germany	The cargo ship sank off Rügen, Vorpommern.

=== 11 January ===
List of shipwrecks: 11 January 1922
Ship	State	Description
Inaho Maru	Japan	The cargo ship came ashore on Rossel Island and was wrecked. Her crew were rescued by Meiko Maru (Japan).

=== 12 January ===
List of shipwrecks: 12 January 1922
Ship	State	Description
C. C. Mengel, Jr.	United States	The schooner came ashore on Morant Cays, Jamaica and was wrecked.
Tidal	United Kingdom	The coaster foundered in the North Sea 10 nautical miles (19 km) off Lowestoft, Suffolk. All 15 people on board were rescued by Dalton (United Kingdom).

=== 13 January ===
List of shipwrecks: 13 January 1922
Ship	State	Description
Italica	Spain	The cargo ship struck the Beduidos Rocks, off Vigo and foundered.

=== 16 January ===
List of shipwrecks: 16 January 1922
Ship	State	Description
Mark H. Gray	United Kingdom	The schooner was abandoned in ice off Lark Harbour, Newfoundland.
Roma	Norway	The cargo ship sank off Kombusch, Germany. Her crew were rescued by Rhea (Finland).
Vesta	Germany	The cargo ship caught fire in the North Sea 40 nautical miles (74 km) south east of Lowestoft, Suffolk, United Kingdom. She was abandoned with the loss of 10 of her 20 crew. Survivors were rescued by the trawler E.W.B. (United Kingdom). The still-burning ship was taken in tow for Hook of Holland, Netherlands, by Zwarte Zee (Netherlands).

=== 19 January ===
List of shipwrecks: 19 January 1922
Ship	State	Description
Agnes P. Duff	United Kingdom	The schooner was wrecked at St. John's, Newfoundland. Her crew were rescued.
Eileen Lake	Newfoundland	The schooner foundered in the Atlantic Ocean west of Newfoundland. Five crew were rescued by Persier (Belgium).
Marceau	Marine Nationale	The Marceau-class ironclad came ashore at Tunis, Tunisia and was wrecked.

=== 20 January ===
List of shipwrecks: 20 January 1922
Ship	State	Description
Emma Haubuss	Germany	The cargo ship came ashore at Agger, Denmark. Her crew were rescued.

=== 22 January ===
List of shipwrecks: 22 January 1922
Ship	State	Description
Mod	Norway	The cargo ship foundered in the Atlantic Ocean 1,200 nautical miles (2,200 km) off Halifax, Nova Scotia, Canada with the loss of 9 of her 32 crew. Survivors were rescued by Melmore Head and Montcalm (both United Kingdom).

=== 23 January ===
List of shipwrecks: 23 January 1922
Ship	State	Description
Pivoc	United Kingdom	The cargo ship was wrecked in the estuary of the Seine at Rouen, Seine Maritime, France.
Vigan	United States	The cargo ship suffered an engine failure and was beached on the north coast of Haitan Island, China.

=== 24 January ===
List of shipwrecks: 24 January 1922
Ship	State	Description
Asquith	United Kingdom	The schooner foundered in the Atlantic Ocean (42°19′N 42°30′W). Her crew were rescued by Arcturus (United States).
Balmyle	United Kingdom	The cargo ship ran aground in Larne Lough. She was refloated on 16 February.
Cairnside	United Kingdom	The coaster struck a rock west of Sark, Channel Islands and sank. All 13 crew survived.
Cormorant	United Kingdom	The cargo ship sprang a leak in the Atlantic Ocean (33°00′00″S 52°21′30″W) and was abandoned. Her crew were rescued by Ruy Barboza (Brazil).
Helen B. Sterling	United Kingdom	The schooner sprang a leak in the Pacific Ocean 150 nautical miles (280 km) north of Three Kings, New Zealand and was abandoned. Her crew were rescued by HMAS Melbourne (Royal Australian Navy).

=== 25 January ===
List of shipwrecks: 25 January 1922
Ship	State	Description
Quo Vadis	France	The schooner was driven ashore at Viana do Castelo, Portugal with the loss of two crew. The survivors were rescued.

=== 27 January ===
List of shipwrecks: 27 January 1922
Ship	State	Description
Champion	United Kingdom	The tug collided with San Jose (Norway) in the River Thames at Tilbury, Essex and sank. Her crew were rescued.
Rosa	Belgium	The cargo ship ran aground at Arbroath, Forfarshire, United Kingdom. All 16 crew were rescued.

=== 28 January ===
List of shipwrecks: 28 January 1922
Ship	State	Description
Laura	Denmark	The schooner sprang a leak and sank off the Shetland Islands, United Kingdom. Four crew were rescued by a German trawler.
Optimist	United Kingdom	The schooner was abandoned in the Atlantic Ocean. Six crew were rescued by Ampetico (United Kingdom).

=== 29 January ===
List of shipwrecks: 29 January 1922
Ship	State	Description
Antinous	United Kingdom	The cargo ship ran aground off Porto, Portugal. She broke her back the next day and was abandoned as a total loss.
Santander	Spain	The bucket dredger sank at Santander, Cantabria.

=== Unknown date ===
List of shipwrecks: Unknown date 1922
Ship	State	Description
USS A-2	United States Navy	The Plunger-class submarine was sunk as a target in mid-January.
USS B-3	United States Navy	The B-class submarine was sunk as a target before 17 January.
James M. W. Hall	United States	The schooner was abandoned in the Atlantic Ocean. Her crew were rescued by West Canon (United States) and landed at New York on 16 January. She was later towed to New York by USCGC Seneca ( United States Coast Guard).
Klampenborg	Denmark	The coaster foundered in the Baltic Sea with the loss of all twelve crew. A lifeboat from the ship was discovered on 11 January.
Moses Parry	United Kingdom	The schooner ran aground at White Abbey, County Antrim at the end of January. She was refloated on 14 February.

== February ==
=== 1 February ===
List of shipwrecks: 1 February 1922
Ship	State	Description
Eastern Dawn	United States	The cargo ship sank at Baltimore, Maryland.

=== 2 February ===
List of shipwrecks: 2 February 1922
Ship	State	Description
USAT Northern Pacific	United States Army	The troopship caught fire and sank in the Atlantic Ocean 25 nautical miles (46 km) off Cape May, New Jersey.

=== 3 February ===
List of shipwrecks: 3 February 1922
Ship	State	Description
Felix	Denmark	The schooner came ashore south of Leixões, Portugal. Her crew were rescued.
Gaspe	United Kingdom	The barquentine was abandoned in the Atlantic Ocean. Her crew were rescued by Queen Louise (United Kingdom).
Joseph S. Zeman	United States	Carrying a cargo of coal, the 253-foot (77 m), 1,956-gross register ton five-masted schooner ran aground off the coast of Maine on Metinic Island Ledge — a reef off Metinic Island — broke up, and sank without loss of life in up to 50 feet (15 m) of water at 43°53.76′N 069°10.00′W.
Malpas Belle	United Kingdom	The schooner came ashore at Seaton, Devon. All six crew were rescued.

=== 4 February ===
List of shipwrecks: 4 February 1922
Ship	State	Description
Bonn	Norway	The cargo ship collided with Southwestern Miller (United Kingdom) in the River Thames at Greenwich, London and was beached. She was refloated on 14 February.
Fellside	United Kingdom	The cargo ship came ashore 4 nautical miles (7.4 km) north of Aberdeen. Her crew were rescued. She was refloated on 28 February.

=== 6 February ===
List of shipwrecks: 6 February 1922
Ship	State	Description
Luso	Portugal	The cargo ship caught fire at Lisbon. She was scuttled on 10 February.

=== 7 February ===
List of shipwrecks: 7 February 1922
Ship	State	Description
Bessie A. White	United Kingdom	The auxiliary schooner was driven ashore at Smiths Point, Long Island, New York, United States and was a total loss. Her crew survived.
E. M. Sellars	United Kingdom	The schooner was driven ashore at Inagua, Bahamas and was wrecked.
Krakow	Poland	The cargo ship became mired in ice at Tangen, Norway and sank. Her crew survived.
Thistlemore	United Kingdom	The cargo ship came ashore at Cape Cod, Massachusetts, United States. She was refloated on 11 February.

=== 8 February ===
List of shipwrecks: 8 February 1922
Ship	State	Description
Anna Maria	Latvia	The ship sank in the North Sea. Her crew were rescued.
Stramore	United Kingdom	The coaster struck a submerged wreck off Inishtrahull Island, County Donegal, Ireland and sank. All 9 crew survived.
Coylet	United Kingdom	The tanker caught fire in the Atlantic Ocean 12 nautical miles (22 km) west south west of the Sand Key Lighthouse, Florida, United States. Her crew were rescued by Sucrosa (United States).
Norma B. Strong	United Kingdom	The schooner sprang a leak in the Atlantic Ocean (39°15′N 29°05′W). Her crew survived.
Northern Pacific	United States	The decommissioned 8,256-gross register ton former passenger ship and troopship burned, capsized, and sank in the Atlantic Ocean in 140 to 150 feet (43 to 46 m) of water while under tow 30 nautical miles (56 km; 35 mi) south of Cape May, New Jersey. Four of her 28-member crew died.

=== 9 February ===
List of shipwrecks: 9 February 1922
Ship	State	Description
Herbert May	United States	The schooner came ashore in the Marquesas Islands, French Polynesia and was wrecked.

=== 10 February ===
List of shipwrecks: 10 February 1922
Ship	State	Description
Seyar	Yugoslavia	The cargo ship suffered a boiler explosion and sank in the Bosphorus.

=== 14 February ===
List of shipwrecks: 14 February 1922
Ship	State	Description
Carmina	Spain	The schooner sprang a leak in the Atlantic Ocean 40 nautical miles (74 km) west of Leixões, Portugal. She was abandoned by her crew, who were rescued by Hurliness (United Kingdom). Carmina was towed into Leixões by a British trawler.
Kibi Maru No.11	Japan	The cargo ship departed Muroran. No further trace, presumed foundered with the loss of all hands.
Wasp	United States	After 80 mph (130 km/h) winds tore her loose from her moorings at a dock at Metlakatla in Southeast Alaska, the 13-gross register ton, 38.6-foot (11.8 m) fishing vessel became stranded and broke up on the beach without loss of life.

=== 15 February ===
List of shipwrecks: 15 February 1922
Ship	State	Description
Suiyer Maru	Japan	The cargo ship struck a rock and foundered in the Kurushima Strait.

=== 16 February ===
List of shipwrecks: 16 February 1922
Ship	State	Description
Ojo Maru	Japan	The cargo ship collided with an Imperial Japanese Navy submarine off Yoshima, Shiwaku Islands and was beached.

=== 18 February ===
List of shipwrecks: 18 February 1922
Ship	State	Description
Golden State	United States	The three-masted schooner caught fire in the Atlantic Ocean off Pensacola, Florida and was abandoned. She was towed into Pensacola in a capsized state on 23 February.
Poseidon	Denmark	The cargo ship sprang a leak and ran aground at Skallingen. Her crew were rescued. She broke in two on 9 March and was a total loss.

=== 19 February ===
List of shipwrecks: 19 February 1922
Ship	State	Description
Balsam	United States	The cargo ship ran aground in Lough Foyle. She was refloated on 27 February.
Kathleen Spindler	United Kingdom	The schooner was abandoned in the Atlantic Ocean. Her crew were rescued by Argalia (United Kingdom).

=== 20 February ===
List of shipwrecks: 20 February 1922
Ship	State	Description
Dédaigneuse	French Navy	The sloop-of-war was struck by City of Algiers (flag unknown) at Constantinople, Turkey and was severely damaged.
Glynwood	United Kingdom	The schooner came ashore at Lindesnes, Norway and was wrecked.

=== 21 February ===
List of shipwrecks: 21 February 1922
Ship	State	Description
Taisho Maru No.2	Japan	The cargo ship collided with Wakamatsu Maru (Japan) at Shimonoseki and sank.

=== 22 February ===
List of shipwrecks: 22 February 1922
Ship	State	Description
Assimina M Embiricos	Greece	The cargo ship was wrecked in the Scheldt, Belgium.
J. N. Rafeuse	Newfoundland	The schooner sprang a leak in the Atlantic Ocean and was abandoned (46°01′N 35°08′W). Her crew were rescued by Terrier (United Kingdom).

=== 24 February ===
List of shipwrecks: 24 February 1922
Ship	State	Description
Chokyu Maru No.5	Japan	The cargo ship struck a submerged object at Kobezaki and sank with the loss of a crew member.
Cobra	United Kingdom	The cargo liner was wrecked at Chinde, Portuguese West Africa in a cyclone.
Punduma	United Kingdom	The cargo ship was wrecked at Chinde in a cyclone with the loss of three lives.
NRP Salvador	Portuguese Navy	The river gunboat was wrecked at Chinde in a cyclone.

=== 25 February ===
List of shipwrecks: 25 February 1922
Ship	State	Description
Lowell F. Parks	United Kingdom	The schooner was abandoned and set afire in the Atlantic Ocean.

=== 26 February ===
List of shipwrecks: 26 February 1922
Ship	State	Description
St Leonard	United Kingdom	The trawler, a sold off Castle-class trawler, stranded on Ardmore Rocks, Isley. She was refloated on 6 April, repaired, and returned to service.

=== 27 February ===
List of shipwrecks: 27 February 1922
Ship	State	Description
Rothenburg	Germany	The cargo ship struck a submerged object in the Kattegat and sank. Her crew survived. She was refloated on 18 April.
Valerie	United Kingdom	The schooner sprang a leak and sank off the Cape Verde Islands, Portugal. Her crew were rescued by Fernando (Portugal).

=== 28 February ===
List of shipwrecks: 28 February 1922
Ship	State	Description
Danehurst	United Kingdom	The salvage vessel sank at Liverpool, Lancashire.
Roma	United Kingdom	The cargo ship came ashore in Loch Eriboll and was wrecked.

=== Unknown date ===
List of shipwrecks: Unknown date 1922
Ship	State	Description
Lockwood	United Kingdom	The coaster ran aground in the River Witham at Boston, Lincolnshire. She was refloated on 24 June.

== March ==
=== 1 March ===
List of shipwrecks: 1 March 1922
Ship	State	Description
Minerva	Norway	The whaler was wrecked off the South Shetland Islands.
Pembsco	United Kingdom	The cargo ship departed Burry Port, Glamorgan for Dublin, Ireland. No further trace, presumed foundered in the Irish Sea with the loss of all hands.

=== 2 March ===
List of shipwrecks: 2 March 1922
Ship	State	Description
Eider	United Kingdom	The coaster sprang a leak and foundered in the English Channel off Berry Head, Devon. All 10 crew were rescued by the Brixham Lifeboat.
Grøntoft	Norway	The cargo ship foundered in the Atlantic Ocean (47°48′N 42°24′W) with the loss of all 20 crew.

=== 5 March ===
List of shipwrecks: 5 March 1922
Ship	State	Description
Christine	France	The cargo ship foundered in the Atlantic Ocean 20 nautical miles (37 km) south by west of the Wolf Rock, Cornwall, United Kingdom. Her crew were rescued by War Nawab (United Kingdom).

=== 6 March ===
List of shipwrecks: 6 March 1922
Ship	State	Description
Motherland	United Kingdom	The schooner caught fire in the Indian Ocean off Port Louis, Mauritius. Her crew were rescued. She drifted ashore on 7 March and was a total loss.
Satsuki Maru	Japan	The cargo ship was wrecked in the Yangtze Estuary, China.

=== 7 March ===
List of shipwrecks: 7 March 1922
Ship	State	Description
Cheshire	United Kingdom	The coaster passed The Lizard, Cornwall bound for Fécamp, Seine-Inférieure, France. No further trace, presumed foundered in the English Channel with the loss of all hands.
West Munham	United States	The Design 1013 cargo ship came ashore on Heligoland, Schleswig-Holstein, Germany. She was abandoned by her crew on 8 March.

=== 8 March ===
List of shipwrecks: 8 March 1922
Ship	State	Description
HMS Laertes	Royal Navy	The Laforey-class destroyer came ashore at Newhaven, Sussex after her tow parted. She was later refloated and arrived at Dover on 13 March for scrapping.
Swanston	United Kingdom	The cargo ship was driven ashore on Queen Anne's Rocks, Cattewater, Plymouth, Devon and was wrecked. Her crew were rescued.

=== 9 March ===
List of shipwrecks: 9 March 1922
Ship	State	Description
Selma	United States	The concrete-hulled tanker was damaged when she struck a pier at Tampico, Mexico on 17 or 31 May 1920. Repairs seemed beyond the capabilities of the repair yards and she was towed to a specially dug channel and sunk off Pelican Island, Houston, Texas, partially submerged.

=== 10 March ===
List of shipwrecks: 10 March 1922
Ship	State	Description
Brackenholm	United Kingdom	The schooner departed Ramsey, Isle of Man for Truro, Cornwall. No further trace, presumed foundered with the loss of all hands.
Holdal II	United States	The halibut-fishing vessel struck a rock and sank at the entrance to a harbor on the coast of Bushy Island (56°16′N 132°59′W) in Southeast Alaska.

=== 12 March ===
List of shipwrecks: 12 March 1922
Ship	State	Description
Rosario	United States	The 24-gross register ton, 40.6-foot (12.4 m) fishing vessel dragged her anchor during a storm and was wrecked in Katlian Bay (57°09′N 135°23′W) opposite Kruzof Island in the Alexander Archipelago in Southeast Alaska near Sitka, Territory of Alaska. Her crew of five survived.
Tajima Maru	Japan	The cargo ship ran aground at Qingdao, China. She was refloated on 19 March.

=== 13 March ===
List of shipwrecks: 13 March 1922
Ship	State	Description
Gauntlet	United Kingdom	The tug ran aground and sank at Newhaven, Sussex.
Myriophiton	Greece	The cargo ship was wrecked at Soukhoum, Soviet Union.

=== 17 March ===
List of shipwrecks: 17 March 1922
Ship	State	Description
Elizabeth D	United Kingdom	The schooner came ashore at Saint-Pierre, St. Pierre and Miquelon and was wrecked.

=== 18 March ===
List of shipwrecks: 18 March 1922
Ship	State	Description
Fred Cleeves	United Kingdom	The cargo ship sank in the Atlantic Ocean 4 nautical miles (7.4 km) off Pomarão, Portugal. Her crew survived.

=== 19 March ===
List of shipwrecks: 19 March 1922
Ship	State	Description
Emlynton	United Kingdom	The cargo ship sprang a leak in the Atlantic Ocean and was abandoned. She was later sighted derelict at 41°48′N 9°00′W.

=== 21 March ===
List of shipwrecks: 21 March 1922
Ship	State	Description
Kullaberg	Sweden	The cargo ship ran aground near Elleness, West Lothian, United Kingdom. She was later refloated and beached at Elie, Fife. Refloated again on 3 April.

=== 23 March ===
List of shipwrecks: 23 March 1922
Ship	State	Description
HMS H42	Royal Navy	The H-class submarine was rammed off Gibraltar by HMS Versatile (Royal Navy) and sank with the loss of all 22 crew.
Sakaki Maru	Japan	The cargo ship collided with Eastern Sailor (United States) in the Whangpo River, Shanghai, China and was beached.
Salamanca	Norway	The cargo ship was abandoned in the Bay of Biscay. Her crew were rescued by Argonne (France).

=== 24 March ===
List of shipwrecks: 24 March 1922
Ship	State	Description
Curvos	Portugal	The schooner was destroyed by fire at Falmouth, Cornwall, United Kingdom.
Glenmore	United Kingdom	The cargo ship struck the wreck of Treveal (United Kingdom) in the English Channel off St Alban's Head, Dorset and foundered. Her crew survived.
Maggie Read	United Kingdom	The coaster was destroyed by fire off Ornsay, Inner Hebrides.

=== 25 March ===
List of shipwrecks: 25 March 1922
Ship	State	Description
City of Frankfort	United Kingdom	The cargo ship came ashore on the Chaussées des Pierres Noires, off Brest, Finistère, France. All 15 people on board were rescued. She broke in two on 27 March and was a total loss.
Omar D. Conger	United States	The ferry was destroyed at dock in the Black River at Port Huron, Michigan by a boiler explosion. The four crewmen on board were killed.

=== 27 March ===
List of shipwrecks: 27 March 1922
Ship	State	Description
Diana	United Kingdom	The sealer was abandoned and set afire off the coast of Newfoundland. Her crew were rescued by Sagona (United Kingdom).
Macleod	United Kingdom	The coaster foundered off Sanda Island, Argyllshire. All four crew survived.
Sterling	Norway	The cargo liner came ashore on Sandön, Sweden and sank. All on board were rescued.

=== 29 March ===
List of shipwrecks: 29 March 1922
Ship	State	Description
Majestic	United Kingdom	The ocean liner ran aground at Pagensand, Schleswig-Holstein. She was refloated on 30 March.

=== 30 March ===
List of shipwrecks: 30 March 1922
Ship	State	Description
General Currie	United Kingdom	The schooner came ashore at Saint-Pierre, Saint Pierre and Miquelon. She was refloated on 3 April, but capsized whilst being towed into port.

=== 31 March ===
List of shipwrecks: 31 March 1922
Ship	State	Description
Manurewa	Australia	The barque departed Sydney, New South Wales for Grafton, New South Wales. No further trace, presumed foundered with the loss of all hands.

== April ==
=== 3 April ===
List of shipwrecks: 3 April 1922
Ship	State	Description
Suwa Maru	Japan	The cargo ship ran aground on the White Rock, off Swatow, China. She was abandoned as a total loss on 13 April. Her crew were rescued by a British steamship.

=== 4 April ===
List of shipwrecks: 4 April 1922
Ship	State	Description
Palitana	Egypt	The cargo ship foundered in the Mediterranean Sea 70 nautical miles (130 km) north east of Derna, Libya.

=== 5 April ===
List of shipwrecks: 5 April 1922
Ship	State	Description
Lys	United Kingdom	The cargo ship collided with The Baron (United Kingdom) at the mouth of the River Usk and was beached. She was refloated on 8 April.
Peveril	United Kingdom	The cargo ship sprang a leak at Reval, Estonia and was beached.

=== 7 April ===
List of shipwrecks: 7 April 1922
Ship	State	Description
Countess of Seafield	United Kingdom	The cargo ship caught fire and sank in the North Sea off Peterhead, Aberdeenshire.

=== 11 April ===
List of shipwrecks: 11 April 1922
Ship	State	Description
Kerrier	France	The schooner departed Cardiff, Glamorgan, United Kingdom for Lannion, Côtes-du-Nord. No further trace, presumed foundered with the loss of all hands.

=== 12 April ===
List of shipwrecks: 12 April 1922
Ship	State	Description
Grace van Dusen	United States	The schooner sank in the Atlantic Ocean of West Quoddy, Maine. Her crew were rescued.

=== 13 April ===
List of shipwrecks: 13 April 1922
Ship	State	Description
Cumberland Queen	United Kingdom	The schooner was abandoned in the Atlantic Ocean off Cape Hatteras, North Carolina, United States. She was towed into Norfolk, Virginia by a United States Coast Guard cutter.

=== 16 April ===
List of shipwrecks: 16 April 1922
Ship	State	Description
Lusitania	Portugal	The schooner was abandoned in the Atlantic Ocean (52°24′N 5°10′W). All 15 crew were rescued by Gaelic Star (United Kingdom).

=== 17 April ===
List of shipwrecks: 17 April 1922
Ship	State	Description
Ardachy	United Kingdom	The cargo ship ran aground off Moville, County Donegal, Ireland. She was refloated on 24 April.
Berlin	United States	The 1,634-gross register ton bark was wrecked without loss of life on the Egegik Flats (58°13′N 157°31′W) on the south-central coast of the Territory of Alaska southwest of Naknek and became a total loss. The steamers Nushagak and San Juan (both United States) rescued all 225 people on board.

=== 18 April ===
List of shipwrecks: 18 April 1922
Ship	State	Description
Lambton	Canada	Lost in a storm in Whitefish Bay on Lake Superior.

=== 19 April ===
List of shipwrecks: 19 April 1922
Ship	State	Description
Bisnod	United Kingdom	The cargo ship foundered off Jellasore, India.
Wargwoltic	United Kingdom	The schooner ran aground on the Hog Sty Reef, Bahamas and was wrecked.

=== 20 April ===
List of shipwrecks: 20 April 1922
Ship	State	Description
General Gordon	Spain	The cargo ship capsized and sank at Casablanca, French Morocco. She was refloated on 2 May.
Zero	United Kingdom	The cargo ship collided with Aeolus (United States) at Montevideo, Uruguay and sank.

=== 21 April ===
List of shipwrecks: 21 April 1922
Ship	State	Description
Andree	United Kingdom	The cargo ship was severely damaged by fire at New York, United States.

=== 22 April ===
List of shipwrecks: 22 April 1922
Ship	State	Description
George Andre	Spain	The sailing ship was wrecked at Rosas, Catalonia. Her crew were rescued.

=== 24 April ===
List of shipwrecks: 24 April 1922
Ship	State	Description
Sirdar	United Kingdom	The tug collided with Old North State (United States) at Tilbury, Essex and sank. Her crew survived.

=== 25 April ===
List of shipwrecks: 25 April 1922
Ship	State	Description
Kyma	Greece	The cargo ship caught fire at Constanţa, Romania and sank. She was a total loss.
Stolwijk	Netherlands	The cargo ship ran aground at Åhus, Skåne County, Sweden. She was refloated on 29 April.

=== 26 April ===
List of shipwrecks: 26 April 1922
Ship	State	Description
Député Albert Taillandier	France	The cargo ship sank in the Atlantic Ocean (approximately 49°N 3°W) with the loss of all but one of her crew.

=== 28 April ===
List of shipwrecks: 28 April 1922
Ship	State	Description
Gutterrez Zamora	Mexico	The cargo ship sprang a leak and was beached at Tampico, Tamaulipas. She was plundered by locals and was declared a constructive total loss.

=== 29 April ===
List of shipwrecks: 29 April 1922
Ship	State	Description
Ilia	Germany	The auxiliary sailing ship was destroyed by fire at Emden, Germany.
Victoria de Larrinaga	United Kingdom	The cargo ship ran aground on the Mouchoir Bank, Bahamas. She was abandoned on 1 May. Her crew were rescued by Lake Fairlie (United States).

== May ==
=== 1 May ===
List of shipwrecks: 1 May 1922
Ship	State	Description
Sterling	Norway	The cargo liner came ashore in Seydisfjord, Iceland, and was wrecked. All on board were rescued.
Whittier	United States	The steam tanker ran aground on Saunders Reef, about 10 miles (16 km) south of Point Arena, California and was wrecked. All on board were rescued.

=== 2 May ===
List of shipwrecks: 2 May 1922
Ship	State	Description
Fear Not	United Kingdom	The cargo ship foundered at Clackland Point, Isle of Arran, Buteshire. Her crew were rescued.
Josephine	United States	The schooner was abandoned in the Atlantic Ocean. She was towed to Southport, North Carolina and was beached.
Kiang Tung	China	The cargo ship was destroyed by fire whilst on a voyage from Shusi to Hankow.

=== 3 May ===
List of shipwrecks: 3 May 1922
Ship	State	Description
Turenne	France	The cargo ship ran aground at Mahdia, Tunisia. She was refloated on 10 May.

=== 5 May ===
List of shipwrecks: 5 May 1922
Ship	State	Description
B. R. Tower	United Kingdom	The schooner was wrecked on a reef north east of Grand Turk. Her crew were rescued.

=== 8 May ===
List of shipwrecks: 8 May 1922
Ship	State	Description
City of Charleroy	United Kingdom	The cargo ship collided with Bittern (United Kingdom) at Antwerp, Belgium and was beached. She was refloated later that day.

=== 10 May ===
List of shipwrecks: 10 May 1922
Ship	State	Description
Arbeeco	United Kingdom	The cargo ship ran aground on Renew's Rock, off the coast of Newfoundland and was wrecked. Her crew were rescued.
Constantinos Pateras	Greece	The cargo ship ran aground at Carromeiro, A Coruña, Spain. She broke in two the next day and was a total loss.

=== 15 May ===
List of shipwrecks: 15 May 1922
Ship	State	Description
Dragoon	United Kingdom	The cargo ship sank at Hennebont, Morbihan, France.
Olive	United States	During a voyage from Eagle to Iditarod, the 50-gross register ton scow was crushed by ice and lost on the Iditarod River in the central Territory of Alaska. Her crew of 6 survived.

=== 18 May ===
List of shipwrecks: 18 May 1922
Ship	State	Description
Lothar Bohren	United Kingdom	The cargo ship ran aground at Port-de-Bouc, Bouches-du-Rhône, France. She was refloated on 22 May.

=== 19 May ===
List of shipwrecks: 19 May 1922
Ship	State	Description
Middlesex	United States	The cargo ship was wrecked at Portland, Maine.

=== 20 May ===
List of shipwrecks: 20 May 1922
Ship	State	Description
Dongola	United Kingdom	The cargo ship collided with Kumano Maru (Japan) off Woosung, China and was beached. She was refloated on 22 May.
Egypt	United Kingdom	The ocean liner collided with Seine (France) in the English Channel 28 nautical miles (52 km) off the Armen Lighthouse, Finistère, France. She sank with the loss of 86 of the 352 people on board. Survivors were rescued by Seine.
Gen. John Wilkins	United States	The ship was wrecked on this date.

=== 21 May ===
List of shipwrecks: 21 May 1922
Ship	State	Description
Conestoga	Canada	The cargo ship caught fire and sank in the St Lawrence River.
Emily Eveson	United Kingdom	The cargo ship ran aground on the Clougne Rock, on the south east coast of Alderney, Channel Islands and was wrecked. Her crew were rescued.
Iro	Greece	The cargo ship caught fire at Salonica and was scuttled to extinguish the fire.
St. Patrice	United Kingdom	The cargo ship came ashore west of The Lizard, Cornwall. Her crew were rescued by the Lizard Lifeboat.

=== 22 May ===
List of shipwrecks: 22 May 1922
Ship	State	Description
Virginia Olson	United States	The cargo ship was rammed and sunk by a United States Navy submarine at San Francisco, California.

=== 23 May ===
List of shipwrecks: 23 May 1922
Ship	State	Description
Andree	United Kingdom	The cargo ship collided with H. F. Alexander (United States) at Philadelphia, Pennsylvania and was beached. She was refloated on 27 June.

=== 25 May ===
List of shipwrecks: 25 May 1922
Ship	State	Description
Rosyland	United States	During a voyage along the coast of Kodiak Island from Kodiak to Three Saints Bay carrying seven passengers, four crewmen, and a cargo of two tons of merchandise and lumber, the 42-gross register ton, 54.4-foot (16.6 m) fishing vessel dragged her anchor during a gale in the Gulf of Alaska and was wrecked on a beach – since known locally as Rosyland Beach – in the first bight east of the entrance to Kalsin Bay (57°40′N 152°21′W) about 5 nautical miles (9.3 km; 5.8 mi) west of Cape Chiniak (57°37′N 152°10′W). The vessel Erskin (United States) rescued her 11 passengers and crew.

=== 29 May ===
List of shipwrecks: 29 May 1922
Ship	State	Description
Kwinana	Australia	Kwinana aground in 1922. The hulk of the passenger-cargo ship, heavily damaged and sunk by a December 1920–January 1921 fire and subsequently refloated, broke her moorings at Careening Bay, Garden Island, Western Australia, in a storm, was blown across Cockburn Sound, and was wrecked 3 miles (5 km) north of Rockingham, Western Australia. The wreck was partly destroyed by explosive charges in May 1941 and cut down to water level in 1959.
Welsh Prince	United Kingdom	The cargo ship collided with Iowan (United States) in the Columbia River at Astoria, Oregon, United States and sank with the loss of seven of her crew.

=== 30 May ===
List of shipwrecks: 30 May 1922
Ship	State	Description
Diamantino	Portugal	The schooner foundered in the Bay of Biscay off Ouessant, Finistère, France. All eleven crew were rescued by Ymir (Germany).

=== 31 May ===
List of shipwrecks: 31 May 1922
Ship	State	Description
Tuna	United Kingdom	The cargo ship ran aground of the Fanjove Lighthouse, Zanzibar. She was refloated on 5 June.
Western Belle	United Kingdom	The cargo ship had an engine fire 16 nautical miles (30 km; 18 mi) north northwest of the Hanois Lighthouse, Guernsey Channel Islands and sank.

== June ==
=== 1 June ===
List of shipwrecks: 1 June 1922
Ship	State	Description
Wiltshire	United Kingdom	The cargo liner struck a reef and foundered in the Pacific Ocean off the Great Barrier Island, New Zealand. All 103 crew were rescued.

=== 2 June ===
List of shipwrecks: 2 June 1922
Ship	State	Description
Grimgerde	Germany	The cargo ship collided with Dalston (United Kingdom) in the North Sea and was beached at Saltwick, Yorkshire. Her crew were rescued.
Sirena	Netherlands	The schooner was wrecked in Lake Maracaibo.

=== 3 June ===
List of shipwrecks: 3 June 1922
Ship	State	Description
Adam Smith	United Kingdom	The cargo ship ran aground at Roscoff, Finistère, France. She was refloated on 6 June.
Montcalm	United Kingdom	The ocean liner ran aground in the St. Lawrence River, at Bécancour, Quebec, Canada. All 848 passengers were taken off. She was refloated on 5 June.

=== 5 June ===
List of shipwrecks: 5 June 1922
Ship	State	Description
Lake Bay	United States	The 12-gross register ton, 50-foot (15.2 m) sealing vessel was anchored near the mouth of Necker Bay (56°40′N 135°05′W) in Southeast Alaska with only a small boy aboard and her crew of three and other four passengers ashore when her skiff broke loose and went adrift. One of her part-owners tried to swim out to the skiff from shore but was carried too far by the current. The boy followed instructions from shore to loosen the anchor line in the hope that Lake Bay would drift close enough to the man in the water to save him, but she did not and he drowned. Lake Bay then drifted onto rocks on the south side of the mouth of the bay and later slipped off and sank in deep water without further loss of life.

=== 8 June ===
List of shipwrecks: 8 June 1922
Ship	State	Description
Weichsel	Danzig	The tug collided with Polonio (Denmark) at Danzig and sank with the loss of a crew member.

=== 10 June ===
List of shipwrecks: 10 June 1922
Ship	State	Description
Edward R. West	United States	The four-masted schooner was wrecked in the Windward Islands.

=== 12 June ===
List of shipwrecks: 12 June 1922
Ship	State	Description
HMS Blue Sky	Royal Navy	The Admiralty-type drifter foundered in the North Sea off the Thames Estuary.

=== 14 June ===
List of shipwrecks: 14 June 1922
Ship	State	Description
Kirstene	Norway	The three-masted auxiliary schooner came ashore at Lowestoft, Suffolk, United Kingdom and was wrecked. Her crew were rescued by the Lowestoft Lifeboat.

=== 16 June ===
List of shipwrecks: 16 June 1922
Ship	State	Description
Avaré	Brazil	The cargo ship sank at Hamburg, Germany. She was refloated on 17 August.

=== 18 June ===
List of shipwrecks: 18 June 1922
Ship	State	Description
Spyridon	Greece	The cargo ship issued an SOS in the Atlantic Ocean (42°15′N 8°55′W). She came ashore on the Biduidos Rocks off Vigo, Spain and sank. Her crew survived.

=== 19 June ===
List of shipwrecks: 19 June 1922
Ship	State	Description
Cabo Mondego	Portugal	The sailing vessel foundered in the Atlantic Ocean (approximately 36°N 22°W). Her crew survived.
Robert C. Pringle	United States	Sonar image of the wreck of Robert C. Pringle, 10 June 2022. While towing the steamer Venezuela (United States), the 101-foot (31 m), 141-gross register ton steam tug sank almost immediately in over 300 feet (91 m) of water in Lake Michigan off Sheboygan County, Wisconsin, about 12 nautical miles (22 km; 14 mi) north of Sheboygan, Wisconsin, at 43°41.508′N 087°33.292′W after striking a submerged object. Venezuela rescued her entire crew. The wreck was discovered in 2008 and included in the Wisconsin Shipwreck Coast National Marine Sanctuary in 2021.

=== 23 June ===
List of shipwrecks: 23 June 1922
Ship	State	Description
Puritan		The schooner ran aground off Sable Island, Nova Scotia, Canada and foundered with the loss of 16 of her 19 crew.

=== 27 June ===
List of shipwrecks: 27 June 1922
Ship	State	Description
Bouclier	French Navy	The Bouclier-class destroyer collided with Paris (French Navy) at Toulon, Var. Both vessels were severely damaged.
General Jacques	Belgium	The 47-ton fishing ketch was sunk by a mine 4 miles west southwest of the Noordhinder Lightship, crew picked up.

=== 29 June ===
List of shipwrecks: 29 June 1922
Ship	State	Description
Fairfield	United States	The decommissioned wooden steamer was disposed of by burning off Governor's Island in Boston Harbor.
Providence	United States	The passenger ship ran aground off Rhode Island. Her passengers were taken off. She was refloated on 30 June.
Wakanna	United States	The decommissioned wooden steamer was disposed of by burning off Governor's Island in Boston Harbor.

=== Unknown date ===
List of shipwrecks: Unknown date 1922
Ship	State	Description
Prinz Eugen	French Navy	The Tegetthoff-class battleship (ex-Austro-Hungarian Navy) was sunk as a target in the Atlantic Ocean by the battleships France, Jean Bart and Paris (all French Navy).

== July ==
=== 1 July ===
List of shipwrecks: 1 July 1922
Ship	State	Description
Heathside	United Kingdom	The cargo ship ran aground 7 nautical miles (13 km) off Martín García Island, Uruguay. She was refloated on 13 July.
HMS Insolent	Royal Navy	The Bouncer-class flatiron gunboat foundered in Portsmouth Harbour. Her wreck was sold on 18 June 1925 for breaking up.
Moineau	France	The tanker caught fire at Constanţa, Romania and was a total loss.

=== 3 July ===
List of shipwrecks: 3 July 1922
Ship	State	Description
Anasthasios	Greece	The cargo ship ran aground off Martín García Island, Uruguay. She was refloated on 31 July.
Canadian Commander	United Kingdom	The refrigerated cargo ship ran aground at Saint Pierre and Miquelon. She was refloated on 16 July.

=== 4 July ===
List of shipwrecks: 4 July 1922
Ship	State	Description
Spray	United Kingdom	The tug collided with Cairndhu (United Kingdom) at Montreal, Quebec, Canada and sank with the loss of 6 lives.

=== 5 July ===
List of shipwrecks: 5 July 1922
Ship	State	Description
Brussels	United Kingdom	The cargo ship ran aground at Shoreham-by-Sea, Sussex. She was wrecked in a gale the next day.
Duymaer van Twist	Netherlands	The passenger ship caught fire on a voyage from Batavia, Netherlands East Indies to Penang, Malaya. She was beached on the Telok Dalam Bay Reef. She was refloated on 10 July and towed to Sabang, Netherlands East Indies for repairs.
Orthia	United Kingdom	The cargo ship collided with Airedale (United Kingdom) in the Atlantic Ocean off Father Point, Quebec, Canada. She was beached 1 nautical mile (1.9 km) off the White Island Lightship (Canada). Her crew were rescued.

=== 6 July ===
List of shipwrecks: 6 July 1922
Ship	State	Description
Louis Ernest	United Kingdom	The sailing ship struck the wreck of HMS Glatton (Royal Navy) and sank at Dover, Kent.

=== 7 July ===
List of shipwrecks: 7 July 1922
Ship	State	Description
Nor-Kap	United States	The 15-gross register ton motor vessel was destroyed by fire in Triangle Bay on the coast of the Territory of Alaska.
SMS Nürnberg	Imperial German Navy	The captured Königsberg-class light cruiser was sunk as a target in the English Channel off the Isle of Wight by British forces.

=== 8 July ===
List of shipwrecks: 8 July 1922
Ship	State	Description
El Kahira	United Kingdom	The cargo ship passed St. Catherine's Point, Isle of Wight bound for Algiers, Algeria. Presumed later foundered in the English Channel with the loss of all hands. The body of her captain washed up at Cap Gris Nez, Pas-de-Calais, France in the early days of August 1922.
Nantwa Maru	Japan	The cargo ship ran aground and sank at Shikotsosaki.
Nieuw Amsterdam	Netherlands	Cargo in the ocean liner's number 5 hold caught fire while she was at her pier in Hoboken, New Jersey. Her crew, Hoboken FD, and the New York FD fireboat James Duane fought the fire. 100 firemen were overcome by toxic fumes. The fireboat Thomas Willett rescued James Duane's crew. The fire was extinguished after five and a half hours. The next day thousands of gallons of water were pumped out of Nieuw Amsterdam's number 5 hold. Damage was estimated at more than $100,000.

=== 10 July ===
List of shipwrecks: 10 July 1922
Ship	State	Description
Lord Harrington	United Kingdom	The cargo ship ran aground on the Pelican Spit, Smyrna, Turkey. She was refloated on 13 July.

=== 11 July ===
List of shipwrecks: 11 July 1922
Ship	State	Description
France	France	The barque ran aground on reefs in New Caledonia, at approximately 21°00′S 165°00′E, near Nouméa. She was thrown ashore by a large wave on 13 July. Attempts to refloat the vessel failed and she sank later in the year.

=== 12 July ===
List of shipwrecks: 12 July 1922
Ship	State	Description
Cananova	United States	The cargo ship ran aground on Green Island, Jamaica. She was refloated on 20 July.
Somme	France	The schooner foundered in the English Channel off Lézardrieux, Côtes-du-Nord. Her crew survived.

=== 13 July ===
List of shipwrecks: 13 July 1922
Ship	State	Description
Aviateur de Terlines	France	The schooner caught fire at Marseille, Bouches-du-Rhône and was a total loss.

=== 14 July ===
List of shipwrecks: 14 July 1922
Ship	State	Description
Allie	United Kingdom	The cargo ship ran aground in the Gulf of Bothnia off the Snipan Lightship (Finland). She was refloated on 25 July and put into Holmsund, Västerbotten County, Sweden leaking severely.

=== 16 July ===
List of shipwrecks: 16 July 1922
Ship	State	Description
Hjeltenæs	Norway	The schooner caught fire and sank in the Atlantic Ocean (51°00′N 13°00′W). All 16 crew were rescued by Bannack (United States).

=== 17 July ===
List of shipwrecks: 17 July 1922
Ship	State	Description
Ursus	United Kingdom	The cargo ship ran aground on Holmögadd, Västerbotten County, Sweden. She was refloated on 21 July.

=== 19 July ===
List of shipwrecks: 19 July 1922
Ship	State	Description
John R. Fox	United States	The schooner was driven ashore at Bottlenose Carcos, Turks Islands and was wrecked.

=== 21 July ===
List of shipwrecks: 21 July 1922
Ship	State	Description
Holmes A. Frank	United Kingdom	The schooner was driven ashore at Querpon, Newfoundland and was wrecked.

=== 23 July ===
List of shipwrecks: 23 July 1922
Ship	State	Description
Roi Albert	Belgium	The cargo ship ran aground north of Cape St. Vincent, Portugal. She was declared a total loss. Her crew were rescued.

=== 25 July ===
List of shipwrecks: 25 July 1922
Ship	State	Description
Charles Braley	United States	The tanker suffered an explosion and fire in the Atlantic Ocean 75 nautical miles (139 km) east north east of Tampa, Florida and sank. Her crew survived.

=== 26 July ===
List of shipwrecks: 26 July 1922
Ship	State	Description
USS Granite State	United States Navy	While under tow to be scrapped, the hulk — the former 2,600-displacement ton ship-of-the-line USS New Hampshire — which had burned and sunk on 23 May 1921 and been refloated in July 1922, burned and sank again in the Atlantic Ocean off Half Way Rock near Manchester-by-the-Sea, Massachusetts, after her tow line parted in a storm. Her wreck settled in up to 30 feet (9.1 m) of water just off the east end of Graves Island at 42°34′16″N 070°44′45″W.
Metschta	France	The cargo ship collided with Bitinia (Italy) at Constantinople and was beached. She was refloated on 31 July.

=== 27 July ===
List of shipwrecks: 27 July 1922
Ship	State	Description
Calista	United States	The coaster collided with Hawaii Maru (Japan) at Seattle, Washington and sank.
Empress	United States	The 23-gross register ton motor vessel sank off Angle Point (55°14′20″N 131°25′30″W) on the coast of Bold Island (55.2492°N 131.4169°W) in Southeast Alaska about two minutes after the 25-ton motor vessel Vega (United States) collided with her, cutting her stern off. Vega rescued her crew of two.
Tartar	Norway	The cargo ship was driven ashore at Korsør, Denmark. She was refloated on 31 July but found to be leaking severely and was beached.

=== 29 July ===
List of shipwrecks: 29 July 1922
Ship	State	Description
County of Carmarthen	United Kingdom	The cargo ship ran aground on Maio, Cape Verde Islands, Portugal. She was declared a total loss on 1 August.

=== 30 July ===
List of shipwrecks: 30 July 1922
Ship	State	Description
Ayala Mendi	Spain	The cargo ship collided with Francesco Ferruccio (Regia Marina) in the Bay of Biscay and sank with the loss of one of her 33 crew.
Vancouver Maru	Japan	The cargo ship ran aground 3 nautical miles (5.6 km) north east by east of Cape Henry, Virginia, United States. She was refloated on 7 August.

=== 31 July ===
List of shipwrecks: 31 July 1922
Ship	State	Description
Guglielmo Pepe	Regia Marina	The Alessandro Poerio-class destroyer was rammed by Bolsena (Italy) at Constantinople, Turkey and was severely damaged. She was beached but later refloated and taken to the Golden Horn for drydocking.
Rapids Prince	United Kingdom	The passenger ship ran aground in the Lachine Rapids, Saint Lawrence River, Quebec, Canada. Her passengers were taken off.

=== Unknown date ===
List of shipwrecks: Unknown July 1922
Ship	State	Description
Malicia Enos	United States	The fishing schooner left Gloucester, Massachusetts in early July for the Georges Bank and vanished. Lost with all five crewmen.

== August ==
=== 1 August ===
List of shipwrecks: 1 August 1922
Ship	State	Description
Aoku Maru	Japan	The cargo ship suffered an onboard explosion at Kobe and was a total loss.
John A. Campbell	United States	The schooner was destroyed by fire at Tarawa, Gilbert and Ellice Islands.

=== 2 August ===
List of shipwrecks: 2 August 1922
Ship	State	Description
Brumath	United Kingdom	The cargo ship was destroyed by fire at Port-Daniel, Quebec, Canada.
Edward	United States	The tow steamer was sunk by an explosion off Gold Street, Brooklyn, a total loss. Five crew killed.
Gondia	United Kingdom	Gondia The cargo ship was last reported on this date in the Pacific Ocean (22°38′N 117°15′E). No further trace, presumed foundered with the loss of all hands.
San Maurizio	Italy	The coaster was driven ashore at Karaburun, Turkey. Her crew were rescued.

=== 4 August ===
List of shipwrecks: 4 August 1922
Ship	State	Description
Ella F.	United Kingdom	The schooner sank at Stripe Island, Labrador, Canada.

=== 5 August ===
List of shipwrecks: 5 August 1922
Ship	State	Description
Grey Abbey	United Kingdom	The coaster foundered in the North Sea 10 nautical miles (19 km) off Holborn Head, Caithness. Her crew survived.

=== 6 August ===
List of shipwrecks: 6 August 1922
Ship	State	Description
Petrell	Norway	The cargo ship struck a rock and sank between Cape Spartell and Cape Arzila, Spain. All 17 crew were rescued by Neutral (Germany).
Shinyei Maru	Japan	The cargo ship ran aground at Shaweishan, China. She was refloated on 23 August.

=== 8 August ===
List of shipwrecks: 8 August 1922
Ship	State	Description
HMS Raleigh	Royal Navy	HMS Raleigh aground. The Hawkins-class cruiser ran aground in Forteau Bay, Labrador, Canada and was wrecked with the loss of eleven of her 690 crew. The wreck was dispersed in September 1926.

=== 9 August ===
List of shipwrecks: 9 August 1922
Ship	State	Description
G.S.L.	United Kingdom	The cargo ship caught fire in the North Sea off Lerwick, Shetland Islands and was beached in Nesting Bay. Her crew were rescued.
Hartside	United Kingdom	The cargo ship came ashore at Punta Palmar, Uruguay (34°00′S 53°32′W). Her 15 crew were taken off on 10 August by Powerful (United Kingdom).

=== 10 August ===
List of shipwrecks: 10 August 1922
Ship	State	Description
Gaarden	Germany	The auxiliary sailing ship foundered in the North Sea
Shinyei Maru	Japan	The cargo ship came ashore at Shaweishan and was a total loss. Her crew were rescued.

=== 11 August ===
List of shipwrecks: 11 August 1922
Ship	State	Description
Annie Melling	United Kingdom	The 117.5-foot (35.8 m), 221-ton steam trawler was sunk in a collision off Tobermory, Mull.

=== 15 August ===
List of shipwrecks: 15 August 1922
Ship	State	Description
Eagle	United States	The 23-gross register ton motor vessel was crushed against ground ice by an ice floe in the Chukchi Sea 5 nautical miles (9.3 km; 5.8 mi) off the coast of Siberia 14 nautical miles (26 km; 16 mi) east of Cape North and was lost. Her crew survived and was rescued by the motor vessel Chukotsk (flag unknown).
José Salgado	Spain	The schooner sank at Santiago de Cuba, Cuba.

=== 16 August ===
List of shipwrecks: 16 August 1922
Ship	State	Description
Henriette	United States	The schooner was wrecked in the Gilbert and Ellice Islands.
Henry T. Scott	United States	The steamer was sunk in a collision with Henry Luckenbach (United States) 11 miles (18 km) east of Cape Flattery. Four crew killed.

=== 17 August ===
List of shipwrecks: 17 August 1922
Ship	State	Description
Olga	Chile	The cargo ship sank at Valparaíso.

=== 18 August ===
List of shipwrecks: 18 August 1922
Ship	State	Description
Ryokai Maru	Japan	The cargo ship ran aground on Panagatan Reef on the south coast of Mindoro, Philippines. She was abandoned the next day as a total loss. Her crew were rescued. Ryokai Maru was refloated on 31 August, repaired and returned to service.

=== 20 August ===
List of shipwrecks: 20 August 1922
Ship	State	Description
Manordilo	United Kingdom	The cargo ship collided with Chindwara in the North Sea and sank. She was refloated on 15 November and beached.

=== 22 August ===
List of shipwrecks: 22 August 1922
Ship	State	Description
Cymric	United Kingdom	The schooner struck the Brandy Rocks and was beached at Kilmore, County Wexford. She was refloated on 24 August.
Leerdam	United Kingdom	The cargo ship sprang a leak and was beached at Portpatrick, Wigtownshire. She was refloated on 26 August.

=== 23 August ===
List of shipwrecks: 23 August 1922
Ship	State	Description
Nieves	Spain	The sailing vessel was in collision with Freifeld (Germany) in the Atlantic Ocean off Cape St. Vincent, Portugal and sank. Her crew were rescued by Freifeld.

=== 24 August ===
List of shipwrecks: 24 August 1922
Ship	State	Description
Asahi Maru	Japan	The cargo ship sank at Inuboyezaki in a typhoon.
Kibi Maru No.16	Japan	The cargo ship sank at Inuboyezaki in a typhoon.

=== 25 August ===
List of shipwrecks: 25 August 1922
Ship	State	Description
Cordelia	United Kingdom	The tanker ran aground off Fort Tigné, Malta. She was refloated on 4 September.

=== 26 August ===
List of shipwrecks: 26 August 1922
Ship	State	Description
Borulos	United Kingdom	The passenger ship ran aground in the Red Sea. Her passengers were taken off by Mahmoudieh (United Kingdom). She was refloated on 29 August.
France	French Navy	The Courbet-class battleship struck an uncharted rock in Quiberon Bay and sank with the loss of 3 of her 1,115 crew.
Niitaka	Imperial Japanese Navy	The Niitaka-class cruiser ran ground, capsized, and sank in a storm off the Kamchatka Peninsula with the loss of 284 of her 299 crew.
Philadelphia	United States	The ocean liner was beached at Naples, Italy.

=== 28 August ===
List of shipwrecks: 28 August 1922
Ship	State	Description
Baluchistan	United Kingdom	The cargo ship ran aground in the Saint Lawrence River downstream of Quebec City, Canada. She was refloated on 4 September.
Itata	Chile	The passenger ship struck a rock and sank in the Pacific Ocean off Choros Island. There were 21 survivors of about 350 people on board.

=== 29 August ===
List of shipwrecks: 29 August 1922
Ship	State	Description
Cubwood	United Kingdom	The cargo ship was destroyed by fire at Charleston, South Carolina, United States.
Horley	United Kingdom	The coaster ran aground on the Kravastone Rock off the Farne Islands, Northumberland and was wrecked. Her crew survived. She sank on 9 September.

=== 30 August ===
List of shipwrecks: 30 August 1922
Ship	State	Description
J. Edward Drake	United States	The schooner foundered in the Atlantic Ocean (approximately 36°N 57°W). Her crew were rescued by Ciscar (United Kingdom).

=== 31 August ===
List of shipwrecks: 31 August 1922
Ship	State	Description
Azopardo	Argentine Navy	The despatch boat was rammed, split in two, and sunk at Buenos Aires by American Legion (United States). Alfarez Mackinlay, Gaviota, La Pampa, Patagonia and Patria (all Argentine Navy) were damaged in the incident.

== September ==
=== 1 September ===
List of shipwrecks: 1 September 1922
Ship	State	Description
Eagle	United Kingdom	The cargo ship was crushed by pack ice and sank 15 nautical miles (28 km) of North Cape, Prince Edward Island, Canada.
Eurydamas	United Kingdom	The cargo ship collided with Carnarvonshire (United Kingdom) in the Elbe at Blankenese, Hamburg, Germany and was beached.

=== 2 September ===
List of shipwrecks: 2 September 1922
Ship	State	Description
Ezardian	United Kingdom	The coaster collided with Zuiderdijk (Netherlands) in the Scheldt at Vlissingen, Netherlands and sank with the loss of 7 of the 19 people on board. Survivors were rescued by Zuiderdijk, a Dutch fishing vessel and a German merchant ship.
Queen Bee	Australia	Queen Bee in Sydney Harbour. The 1907 steam collier was sunk off Barrenjoey lighthouse, Australia in 1922.
W. J. Patterson	United States	The four-masted schooner arrived at Jacksonville, Florida with her cargo on fire and was scuttled.

=== 3 September ===
List of shipwrecks: 3 September 1922
Ship	State	Description
Barrenfork	United States	The tug capsized and sank at Jacksonville, Florida.

=== 4 September ===
List of shipwrecks: 4 September 1922
Ship	State	Description
Adrian Klein	United States	The motor schooner was lost at the Okalee River (60°03′N 144°01′W) on the south-central coast of the Territory of Alaska.
Benfinch	United Kingdom	The coaster foundered 8 nautical miles (15 km) off the Mull of Kintyre, Argyllshire. Her crew survived.
Tetlin	United States	During a voyage in the Territory of Alaska from the upper part of the Nabesna River to Fairbanks, the 65-gross register ton, 60.5-foot (18.4 m) sternwheel paddle steamer struck a sandbar about 10 miles (16 km) above the mouth of the river, tearing her bottom out. She sank on the sand bar. All five members of her crew survived. Her machinery was salvaged, but ice completely destroyed her hull over the winter of 1922–1923.

=== 5 September ===
List of shipwrecks: 5 September 1922
Ship	State	Description
Bluet	France	The schooner collided with Baoule (France) in the Mediterranean Sea off Bec d'Ambès, Gironde and sank.
Colthraps	United States	The cargo ship caught fire at Pensacola, Florida and was severely damaged.
Maid of Canada	United Kingdom	The schooner collided with Sadie Mac (United Kingdom) at Halifax, Nova Scotia, Canada and sank. Her crew survived.

=== 9 September ===
List of shipwrecks: 9 September 1922
Ship	State	Description
Hammonia	Germany	The ocean liner foundered in the Atlantic Ocean 80 nautical miles (150 km) off Vigo, Spain (41°55′N 10°50′W). All 557 people on board were rescued by Boldway, City of Chester, City of Valencia, Darro, Euclid, Kinfauns Castle, Soldier Prince (all United Kingdom) and a Greek merchant ship.

=== 11 September ===
List of shipwrecks: 11 September 1922
Ship	State	Description
Tamara Eleven	Germany	The barque was wrecked at Oulu, Finland.

=== 13 September ===
List of shipwrecks: 13 September 1922
Ship	State	Description
Vanse	Norway	The cargo ship ran aground on the Haisborough Sands, Norfolk, United Kingdom and was wrecked. Her crew were rescued by Vulcan City (United Kingdom).

=== 14 September ===
List of shipwrecks: 14 September 1922
Ship	State	Description
Ahrnklim	United States	After she lost power and steering while exiting the "Aqua River" – probably a reference to the Akwe River (59.2828°N 139.0494°W) – on the south-central coast of the Territory of Alaska, the 64-gross register ton, 66-foot (20.1 m) motor vessel was washed ashore and wrecked about 0.5 nautical miles (0.9 km; 0.6 mi) west of the entrance to the river. She became a total loss.

=== 15 September ===
List of shipwrecks: 15 September 1922
Ship	State	Description
Earlshall	United Kingdom)	The collier departed Newcastle-upon-Tyne for Hamburg, Germany. She was apparently abandoned on 16 September. She was discovered derelict on 22 September by the trawler Seefahrt (Germany) and taken in tow, but the tow had to be abandoned. She sank off the Norderney Lightship (Germany) (54°05′N 6°59′E). There were no survivors of her crew.

=== 18 September ===
List of shipwrecks: 18 September 1922
Ship	State	Description
Lisbeth	Sweden	The cargo ship sank off Gedser, Denmark. Six crew were rescued by a Danish merchant ship.
Rellim	United Kingdom	The cargo ship collided with John S. Calvert (United Kingdom) in the River Ouse at Goole, Yorkshire and sank.
Thomas L. Wand	United States	The cargo ship came ashore at Point Sur, California and was a total loss.

=== 19 September ===
List of shipwrecks: 19 September 1922
Ship	State	Description
Begona No.1	Spain	The cargo ship foundered 7 nautical miles (13 km) south west of Cape Roca.
Corral	Chile	The cargo ship was destroyed by fire at Huasco.

=== 20 September ===
List of shipwrecks: 20 September 1922
Ship	State	Description
Bustard	United Kingdom	The tug struck a submerged wreck and sank at Milford Haven, Pembrokeshire. She was refloated on 22 September.

=== 21 September ===
List of shipwrecks: 21 September 1922
Ship	State	Description
Ballybrack	United Kingdom	The schooner came ashore at Soerdal, Sweden and was wrecked. Her crew were rescued.
Svaland	Norway	The auxiliary sailing ship was driven ashore at Höganäs, Sweden. She was refloated on 9 October.

=== 22 September ===
List of shipwrecks: 22 September 1922
Ship	State	Description
Sidi Abdallah	France	The cargo ship collided with N. Hadzikyriakos (Greece) in the Mediterranean Sea (36°52′N 0°22′W). Her crew were rescued.

=== 23 September ===
List of shipwrecks: 23 September 1922
Ship	State	Description
City of Amiens	United Kingdom	The cargo ship ran aground off Camariñas, Galicia, Spain and sank. Her crew were rescued.

=== 24 September ===
List of shipwrecks: 24 September 1922
Ship	State	Description
Fearless	United States	The 10-gross register ton motor vessel was wrecked in Howkan Narrows (54°52′N 132°48′W) in Southeast Alaska when the anchor chain on a log boom she was moored to give way during a gale and the logs forced her ashore. Her crew of two survived.
HMS Speedy	Royal Navy	The destroyer sank after colliding with a tug in the Sea of Marmara.

=== 25 September ===
List of shipwrecks: 25 September 1922
Ship	State	Description
Cabo San Antonio	Spain	The cargo ship was wrecked off Aljezur, Portugal and was wrecked.

=== 26 September ===
List of shipwrecks: 26 September 1922
Ship	State	Description
P.L.M. 8	France	The cargo ship came ashore at Cape Raso, Portugal. She was a total loss.

=== 28 September ===
List of shipwrecks: 28 September 1922
Ship	State	Description
Chaddesley	United Kingdom	The cargo ship came ashore at Theddlethorpe, Lincolnshire. She was refloated on 1 October.
Enterprise	United Kingdom	The cargo ship ran aground on the Middle Cross Sand, North Sea. She was abandoned by her crew the next day pending salvage operations. She was refloated on 6 October.

=== 29 September ===
List of shipwrecks: 29 September 1922
Ship	State	Description
Alecto	United States	After she suffered engine trouble during a voyage from Juneau to Seldovia, Territory of Alaska, the 8.92-gross register ton launch was stranded 0.25 nautical miles (0.5 km; 0.3 mi) west of Ocean Cape Light (59°33′N 139°50′W) near Yakutat, Territory of Alaska. The only person aboard survived. Her hull was pounded to pieces by the surf, but her diesel engine was salvaged on 2 October.

== October ==
=== 2 October ===
List of shipwrecks: 2 October 1922
Ship	State	Description
Ketchikan	United States	The cargo ship struck an iceberg in the Icy Strait and was beached.

=== 3 October ===
List of shipwrecks: 3 October 1922
Ship	State	Description
Helen Jean	United Kingdom	The schooner sprang a leak and was towed in to the Turks Islands by HMS Capetown (Royal Navy). She sank at her moorings the next day and was a total loss.

=== 5 October ===
List of shipwrecks: 5 October 1922
Ship	State	Description
Rovigno	Italy	The cargo ship ran aground 12 nautical miles (22 km) off the coast of Brazil 60 nautical miles (110 km) south of Rio Grande, Rio Grande do Sul. All but two of her crew were taken off on 8 October.

=== 6 October ===
List of shipwrecks: 6 October 1922
Ship	State	Description
Bessie	United Kingdom	The schooner ran aground at Ecum Secum, Nova Scotia, Canada. She was declared a constructive total loss.
St. Hedro	United Kingdom	The schooner caught fire in the Atlantic Ocean (44°00′N 47°23′W). Her crew were rescued by Creoula (United Kingdom).

=== 7 October ===
List of shipwrecks: 7 October 1922
Ship	State	Description
Lyman Stewart	United States	The Union Oil tanker on her way from San Francisco to Seattle with a cargo of oil and gasoline collided with freighter Walter A. Luckenbach (United States) in Golden Gate and had to be beached to avoid sinking. She was later declared a total loss, Her crew were taken off.

=== 10 October ===
List of shipwrecks: 10 October 1922
Ship	State	Description
Kaupo	Latvia	The schooner sprang a leak in the Atlantic Ocean off Faial Island, Azores, Portugal and was abandoned. Her crew were rescued.
Swiftstar	United States	The tanker on her way from San Pedro to Fall River with a cargo of 70,000 barrels of oil ran aground on the southern end of Block Island and became stranded. The crew was taken off the next day by the US submarine N-2 and the ship was refloated on the 15th and after extensive repairs returned to service.

=== 12 October ===
List of shipwrecks: 12 October 1922
Ship	State	Description
City of Honolulu	United States	The ocean liner caught fire in the Pacific Ocean whilst on a voyage between Los Angeles, California and Honolulu, Hawaii (31°07′N 131°40′W). The passengers and crew were rescued by the steamer West Faralon (United States). City of Honolulu was scuttled on 17 October by the cutter USCGC Shawnee ( United States Coast Guard) at 32°30′N 129°45′W.

=== 15 October ===
List of shipwrecks: 15 October 1922
Ship	State	Description
Cornelis	Netherlands	The cargo ship ran aground off the Grundballen Lightship (Sweden). She later sank with the loss of all hands.

=== 16 October ===
List of shipwrecks: 16 October 1922
Ship	State	Description
USS PE-31	United States Navy	The Eagle-class patrol craft ran aground on Sow and Pigs Reef off Cuttyhunk Island, Massachusetts, broke up, and sank without loss of life on the south side of the reef at 41°24′18″N 070°57′54″W.
Rossia	Soviet Navy	The armored cruiser broke free from her tow in the Baltic Sea and stranded on the Dyvelseye Shoal. She was refloated in July 1922.

=== 17 October ===
List of shipwrecks: 17 October 1922
Ship	State	Description
Hopelyn	United Kingdom	The cargo ship was wrecked on Scroby Sands, Norfolk. All 24 crew and the ship's cat were rescued.

=== 18 October ===
List of shipwrecks: 18 October 1922
Ship	State	Description
Seaman A. O.	United Kingdom	The schooner came ashore at Nantucket, Massachusetts. She was refloated on 23 October.

=== 19 October ===
List of shipwrecks: 19 October 1922
Ship	State	Description
Concord	United States	The passenger ship caught fire in the Atlantic Ocean whilst on a voyage from New York to Providence, Rhode Island. Her passengers were taken off by Mohegan (United States).
Hopelyn	United Kingdom	The steamship was wrecked in a north-easterly gale on North Scroby Sands, near Great Yarmouth, bound for London from Newcastle-upon-Tyne with a cargo of coal. After efforts lasting 32 hours, involving the RNLI lifeboats Kentwell, of Gorleston, and Agnes Cross, of Lowestoft, 24 men, and a black kitten, were rescued, and landed at 07:00 on the 21 October.
Lenape	United States	The cargo ship ran aground off Jacksonville, Florida. She was refloated on 6 November.
Lizzie D. (or Lizzie D. A.)	United States	The 77-or-84-foot (23.5 or 25.6 m) (sources disagree), 122-gross register ton tug sank in 80 feet (24 m) of water in the North Atlantic Ocean south of Long Island, New York, 8 nautical miles (15 km; 9.2 mi) southeast of Atlantic Beach Inlet with the loss of her entire crew of 8 or 13 (sources disagree) men. Her owners reported her as having no cargo aboard at the time of her loss, but an examination of her wreck in July 1977 discovered that she had been operating as a rum runner during Prohibition in the United States and had sunk with a cargo of Kentucky bourbon and Canadian rye whisky aboard. Her wreck is known as the "Rum Runner."
Modica	Norway	The cargo ship ran aground at Montreal, Quebec, Canada. She was refloated on 23 October.

=== 20 October ===
List of shipwrecks: 20 October 1922
Ship	State	Description
Viktor Rydberg	Sweden	The coaster capsized at Landsort with the loss of three crew.

=== 21 October ===
List of shipwrecks: 21 October 1922
Ship	State	Description
Fritz Schindler	Germany	The tanker collided with Knud II (Denmark) in the Kaiser Wilhelm Canal and sank. Knud II also collided with Umealf (Germany) which was beached.

=== 22 October ===
List of shipwrecks: 22 October 1922
Ship	State	Description
British General	United Kingdom	The tanker came ashore in the Persian Gulf (20°24′N 56°23′E). She was abandoned the next day. Her crew were rescued by Aras (United Kingdom). British General was refloated on 6 November.
Canada	United Kingdom	The cargo ship sprang a leak and was abandoned in the North Sea off Happisburgh, Norfolk. Her crew were rescued by Kyle Bute (United Kingdom). She was towed into Hull, Yorkshire by Nina (United Kingdom).
Gundreda	United Kingdom	The salvage vessel sank in the Helford River at Falmouth, Cornwall.

=== 23 October ===
List of shipwrecks: 23 October 1922
Ship	State	Description
Corsaire	France	The schooner sprang a leak in the Atlantic Ocean (approximately 47°N 5°W). Her crew were rescued by Sonnenberg (Germany).
Roland Morillot	French Navy	The Type UB II submarine sprang a leak and was abandoned in the English Channel west of Guernsey, Channel Islands. Her crew were rescued by Daphne (France). Roland Morillot was subsequently towed into Cherbourg, Seine-Inférieure by Centaure (France).

=== 24 October ===
List of shipwrecks: 24 October 1922
Ship	State	Description
Fagerlund	Norway	The auxiliary sailing ship sank at East Greenwich, London, United Kingdom.
Golden Shore	United States	The cargo ship caught fire at San Francisco, California and was beached.
Hokuyu Maru	Japan	The cargo ship was struck by Okinawa Maru (Japan) at Osaka and sank.
Karal	Latvia	The sailing ship was driven ashore at Steinsort and was wrecked.
Nile	United Kingdom	The 123-foot (37 m), 196-ton steam trawler sprung a leak and sank after leaving port 10 miles (16 km) off Muirhead, Crookhaven, County Cork, Ireland. She had struck a rock 3 days earlier entering port at Crookhaven and was there for the 3 days, apparently without damage. Crew picked up by "Sea Rover" (United Kingdom).

=== 27 October ===
List of shipwrecks: 27 October 1922
Ship	State	Description
Genesta	United Kingdom	The Thames barge collided with Corea (United Kingdom) in the River Thames at Rotherhithe, London and sank.
Viking	United Kingdom	The cargo ship was destroyed by fire at Port of Spain, Trinidad.

=== 28 October ===
List of shipwrecks: 28 October 1922
Ship	State	Description
Canteleu	France	The cargo ship was driven ashore at Brest, Finistère and was wrecked.
Moneyspinner	United Kingdom	The coaster was abandoned in the Bay of Biscay (45°00′N 3°57′W) after her cargo shifted. Her crew were rescued by La Fontaine (France). Moneyspinner was towed into La Rochelle, Charente-Maritime, arriving on 6 November.

=== 29 October ===
List of shipwrecks: 29 October 1922
Ship	State	Description
Duckland	United States	The 10-gross register ton, 42-foot (12.8 m) fishing vessel dragged her anchor and was wrecked at the mouth of Anita Bay (56°14′N 132°23′W) on the northeast coast of Etolin Island in the Alexander Archipelago in Southeast Alaska, becoming a total loss. Her crew of two survived.
Guillem Sorolla	Spain	The cargo ship issued an SOS in the Atlantic Ocean (48°33′N 8°00′W). No further trace, presumed foundered with the loss of all hands.
Pioneer	United Kingdom	The cargo ship caught fire off Poole, Dorset and was a total loss.

=== 30 October ===
List of shipwrecks: 30 October 1922
Ship	State	Description
Gromoboi	Soviet Navy	The decommissioned Gromoboi-class armoured cruiser ran aground in a storm near Liepāja while under tow to Germany in October 1922 for scrapping. Scrapped in place.
St. Jacques	flag unknown	The sailing ship sank in the Atlantic Ocean (4°12′N 8°15′W). Her crew were rescued by Else Hugo Stinnes (Germany).

=== 31 October ===
List of shipwrecks: 31 October 1922
Ship	State	Description
Teti	Italy	The cargo ship foundered in the English Channel 14 nautical miles (26 km) south of St. Michael's Mount, Cornwall, United Kingdom.

== November ==
=== 2 November ===
List of shipwrecks: 2 November 1922
Ship	State	Description
Convention	United States	The 23-gross register ton, 45-foot (13.7 m) fishing vessel sank in Hecate Strait off the coast of British Columbia, Canada, with the loss of her entire crew of five.
Francia	United Kingdom	The cargo ship foundered in the English Channel 5 nautical miles (9.3 km) north north west of the Armen Rock. Her crew were rescued by Gulpen (Norway).

=== 3 November ===
List of shipwrecks: 3 November 1922
Ship	State	Description
Herman Sauber	Germany	The cargo ship foundered in the North Sea 80 nautical miles (150 km) off Spurn Point, Yorkshire, United Kingdom, with the loss of all but one of her crew. The survivor was rescued by the trawler Riveira (United Kingdom).

=== 6 November ===
List of shipwrecks: 6 November 1922
Ship	State	Description
Elswick Manor	United Kingdom	The cargo ship ran aground at Buenos Aires, Argentina. She was refloated on 15 November.
Helen White	United Kingdom	The cargo ship collided with a lighter and sank at Tampico, Tamaulipas, Mexico.

=== 7 November ===
List of shipwrecks: 7 November 1922
Ship	State	Description
Rattler	United States	After an explosion that resulted from the lighting of a match in her hold, the 17-gross register ton, 45-foot (13.7 m) fishing vessel was destroyed by fire without loss of life while moored at a cannery dock at Cordova, Territory of Alaska.

=== 9 November ===
List of shipwrecks: 9 November 1922
Ship	State	Description
Oran	Spain	The cargo ship ran aground at Málaga. She was refloated on 13 November.

=== 10 November ===
List of shipwrecks: 10 November 1922
Ship	State	Description
Beckenham	United Kingdom	The cargo ship ran aground off Cape St. Michel, Quebec, Canada. She was refloated on 23 November.
Nola	United States	The cargo ship caught fire in the Gulf of Mexico off New Orleans, Louisiana and was abandoned. Her crew were rescued by Missouri (United States).
Oregon City	United States	During a voyage from Evans Bay, Territory of Alaska, to Tacoma, Washington, with a crew of seven and a cargo of four tons of herring on board, the 23-gross register ton motor sloop was destroyed in Warm Springs Bay on the coast of Baranof Island in the Alexander Archipelago in Southeast Alaska by a fire that began when her engine backfired. Her crew survived and was rescued by the motorboat Monitor (United States).

=== 11 November ===
List of shipwrecks: 11 November 1922
Ship	State	Description
Arenas	Spain	The cargo ship was driven ashore at Garfanta ny Noja, Cantabria and was wrecked.
Valorous	United States	The fishing vessel foundered in a violent storm in the North Pacific Ocean off the Territory of Alaska or British Columbia.
Washington	United States	With 25,000 pounds (11,000 kg) of fresh halibut aboard, the 36-gross register ton, 54-foot (16 m) fishing schooner was stranded near Cape Suckling (59°59′30″N 143°53′00″W) in the Territory of Alaska during a gale, becoming a total loss. He entire cargo also was lost, but everyone on board survived.

=== 12 November ===
List of shipwrecks: 12 November 1922
Ship	State	Description
Grizzly	United States	During a voyage from Kodiak to Kanatak, Territory of Alaska, with a crew of four and a cargo of 29 tons of lumber, the 28-gross register ton motor vessel was beached in Jute Bay (57°32′30″N 155°51′00″W) in the Shelikof Strait to avoid loss of life after she became heavily iced and sprang a leak. She was declared a total loss.

=== 14 November ===
List of shipwrecks: 14 November 1922
Ship	State	Description
Agga	Norway	The cargo ship ran aground 5 nautical miles (9.3 km) south of Valencia, Spain. She was refloated on 19 December.
Hattie Hickman	United Kingdom	The schooner was wrecked at Duck Island, Newfoundland.
Monte Grappa	Italy	The cargo ship foundered in the Atlantic Ocean (43°08′N 30°57′W). Pittsburgh (United Kingdom) rescued her 45 crew.
Norland	United States	The cargo ship foundered in Lake Michigan off Milwaukee, Wisconsin. Her crew were rescued.

=== 15 November ===
List of shipwrecks: 15 November 1922
Ship	State	Description
Bonnie Jean	United States	While no one was aboard, the 11-gross register ton, 36-foot (11.0 m) motor passenger vessel sank in "Scow Bay" in Southeast Alaska. The wreck report does not specify whether she sank in Scow Bay (56°46′20″N 132°57′50″W) on the coast of Mitkof Island in the Alexander Archipelago near Petersburg, Territory of Alaska, or in Scow Bay (56°42′45″N 135°16′30″W) on Baranof Island in the Alexander Archipelago southeast of Goddard, Territory of Alaska.

=== 17 November ===
List of shipwrecks: 17 November 1922
Ship	State	Description
Cataluña	Spain	The cargo ship ran aground on Sálvora, Galicia and was a total loss. Her crew were rescued.
Lister	United States	During a voyage in the Aleutian Islands from Umnak Island to Unalaska, the 21-gross register ton motor vessel was wrecked on the coast of Unalaska Island 10 nautical miles (19 km; 12 mi) south of Makushin Point (53°45′30″N 167°01′20″W) because of a navigational error due to a faulty compass. Her crew of four survived.

=== 19 November ===
List of shipwrecks: 19 November 1922
Ship	State	Description
San José	Spain	The schooner was abandoned in the Atlantic Ocean (37°46′N 12°54′W) having sprung a leak five days before. Her crew were rescued by Stella (Italy).
Santi	Spain	The cargo ship ran aground on Plana Island, off Cape Santa Pola, Valencia. She broke in two on 21 November and was a total loss.

=== 20 November ===
List of shipwrecks: 20 November 1922
Ship	State	Description
Masuko Maru	Japan	The cargo ship was driven ashore at Newchwang, China and was a total loss.

=== 22 November ===
List of shipwrecks: 22 November 1922
Ship	State	Description
Sara	Italy	The coaster was rammed by Singleton Abbey (United Kingdom) at Valletta, Malta and sank. Her crew were rescued.
Sequana 7	France	The cargo ship foundered in the English Channel off Saint-Valery-sur-Somme, Somme. Her crew were rescued by Honfleur (France).

=== 24 November ===
List of shipwrecks: 24 November 1922
Ship	State	Description
Al	United States	The 6-gross register ton motorboat suffered a gasoline explosion and was destroyed by the resulting fire off North Dundas Island in British Columbia, Canada, south of Dixon Entrance. The launch Ralph (flag unknown) rescued her crew of two.
Rabo	Spain	The cargo ship collided with the trawler Kermelo (France) in the Bay of Biscay north of Cape Prior and sank. Her crew were rescued by Kermelo.

=== 25 November ===
List of shipwrecks: 25 November 1922
Ship	State	Description
Havbryn	Norway	The cargo ship foundered off Kristiansand, Norway. Her crew were rescued by Idefjord (Norway).
Outreau	France	The cargo ship departed from Newcastle upon Tyne, Northumberland for Boulogne, Pas de Calais. She subsequently foundered in the North Sea. A lifebuoy was discovered off the Hook of Holland, Netherlands on 5 December.

=== 27 November ===
List of shipwrecks: 27 November 1922
Ship	State	Description
Heiwa Maru	Japan	The cargo ship was wrecked at Honjō, Akita.

=== 28 November ===
List of shipwrecks: 28 November 1922
Ship	State	Description
Carlos Maria	Spain	The cargo ship foundered in the Cantabrian Sea off Tapia, Asturias.

=== Unknown date ===
List of shipwrecks: Unknown date 1922
Ship	State	Description
Koong Shing	United Kingdom	The cargo ship was wrecked at Wei-Hai-Wei, China.
Morengen	United States	The 25-gross register ton fishing vessel disappeared without trace in a storm in the Gulf of Alaska somewhere between Cape Spencer and Yakutat, Territory of Alaska. Her entire crew of six perished.
Pelican	Canada	The barge ran aground off Sable Island, Nova Scotia. She was refloated and taken in to Sydney, Nova Scotia, where she ran aground again. Subsequently refloated.

== December ==
=== 1 December ===
List of shipwrecks: 1 December 1922
Ship	State	Description
Maplehurst	Canada	The cargo ship foundered in Lake Superior 2 nautical miles (3.7 km) north of the Portage Ship Canal with the loss of 11 of her 20 crew.
Winifred	United Kingdom	The schooner was abandoned and set afire in the Atlantic Ocean 90 nautical miles (170 km) north west of Saint-Pierre, Saint Pierre and Miquelon. Her crew were rescued by Catherine Moulton (United Kingdom).

=== 4 December ===
List of shipwrecks: 4 December 1922
Ship	State	Description
Leytenant Dydymov	Imperial Russian Navy	The auxiliary cruiser foundered 180 nautical miles (330 km) off Shanghai, China with the loss of all 74 people on board.

=== 6 December ===
List of shipwrecks: 6 December 1922
Ship	State	Description
Enigma	United Kingdom	The schooner departed Whitehaven, Cumberland for the Isle of Whithorn, Wigtownshire. She subsequently foundered in the Irish Sea, wreckage from the ship washed up on the Cumbrian coast on 11 December.
Heinrich Kayser	Germany	The cargo ship foundered in the Atlantic Ocean north east of Bermuda (38°31′N 62°12′W) with the loss of all hands.
Warda	flag unknown	The sailing ship was wrecked at Antalya, Turkey.

=== 7 December ===
List of shipwrecks: 7 December 1922
Ship	State	Description
Yoshinogawa Maru	Japan	The cargo ship foundered in the Kii Channel off Tanabe.

=== 11 December ===
List of shipwrecks: 11 December 1922
Ship	State	Description
Erissos	Greece	The cargo ship ran aground off Martín García Island, Uruguay. She was refloated on 17 December.
Wales Maru	Japan	The cargo ship ran aground at Philadelphia, Pennsylvania, United States. She was refloated on 16 December.

=== 13 December ===
List of shipwrecks: 13 December 1922
Ship	State	Description
Elizabeth Bennett	United Kingdom	The schooner ran aground in the Thames Estuary and was abandoned by her five crew. She was later declared a total loss.
Orteric	United Kingdom	The cargo ship ran aground off Point Arena, California, United States. She was a total loss.

=== 14 December ===
List of shipwrecks: 14 December 1922
Ship	State	Description
King David	United Kingdom	The cargo ship ran aground at Buenos Aires, Argentina. She was refloated on 17 December.

=== 17 December ===
List of shipwrecks: 17 December 1922
Ship	State	Description
Gull	United Kingdom	The 118.1-foot (36.0 m), 166-ton steam trawler was sunk in a collision in the North Sea.
Smerdis	United Kingdom	The cargo ship collided with City of London (United Kingdom) in the River Mersey at Liverpool, Lancashire and sank with the loss of 10 of her 18 crew.

=== 18 December ===
List of shipwrecks: 18 December 1922
Ship	State	Description
Bertha	Germany	The cargo ship issued an SOS in the Baltic Sea off Utlängan, Sweden. She came ashore the next day at Karlskrona and was wrecked. Her crew were rescued.
Rio Prento	United Kingdom	The cargo ship ran aground in the English Channel off St. Quentin Point, Somme, France (50°18′N 1°31′E). She broke her back and was a total loss. Her crew survived.
Thunder Bay	United Kingdom	The cargo ship ran aground in Lake Erie. She was refloated on 25 December.

=== 19 December ===
List of shipwrecks: 19 December 1922
Ship	State	Description
Anna Diackis	Greece	The cargo ship caught fire and sank at Marseille, Bouches-du-Rhône, France.
May	United Kingdom	The coaster foundered in the English Channel 15 nautical miles (28 km) south of St. Catharine's Point, Isle of Wight with the loss of two of her 8 crew. Survivors were rescued by the trawler Lapwing (United Kingdom).
Redemirol	France	The cargo ship caught fire at Marseille. She was towed out to sea and scuttled.
Scandinavia	United Kingdom	The coastal tanker was driven ashore at Portland, Dorset. All twelve crew were rescued.
Start	Norway	The cargo ship foundered in the Bay of Biscay off Biscay, Spain. Her crew survived.

=== 20 December ===
List of shipwrecks: 20 December 1922
Ship	State	Description
Swanston	United Kingdom	The cargo ship foundered in the English Channel off Start Point, Devon. Her crew were rescued by Yssel (Netherlands).

=== 21 December ===
List of shipwrecks: 21 December 1922
Ship	State	Description
Cornell	United States	The tow steamer left Cleveland, Ohio for Buffalo, New York and vanished. On 26 December a lifeboat was found with the body of one of her firemen aboard, dead of exposure. Lost with all 8 hands.
Cornubia	United Kingdom	The cargo ship ran aground on the Mantle Rock in Galway Bay and was abandoned by her crew.
Gordon C. Fudge	United Kingdom	The schooner was abandoned and set afire in the Atlantic Ocean (41°56′N 48°31′W). All six crew were rescued by Menominee (United Kingdom).
Ogawa Maru	Japan	The cargo ship ran aground and sank in the Hirado Strait and sank with the loss of a crew member.
Vindilis	France	The cargo ship collided with Asturias (Norway) in the Bay of Biscay and sank.

=== 22 December ===
List of shipwrecks: 22 December 1922
Ship	State	Description
Eleanor	United Kingdom	The cargo ship lost her propeller in the Bristol Channel 6 nautical miles (11 km) off St. Ives Head, Cornwall. Her crew were taken off by Sturdee Rose (United Kingdom). Eleanor came ashore near the Godrevy Lighthouse and was wrecked.
Meta	Denmark	The schooner was abandoned in the English Channel 5 nautical miles (9.3 km) east of the Shambles Lightship (United Kingdom). She was later towed in to Portland, Dorset by Albert Victor and Petrel (both United Kingdom).

=== 23 December ===
List of shipwrecks: 23 December 1922
Ship	State	Description
Armistice	United Kingdom	The schooner foundered in the Atlantic Ocean 30 nautical miles (56 km) off Cape St. Vincent, Portugal. Her crew were rescued by Homer City (United Kingdom).
Gustaf	Finland	The cargo ship collided with M. G. Melchior (Denmark) in the Skagerrak off Moss, Norway and sank. Her crew were rescued.
Maid of Delos	United Kingdom	The cargo ship foundered in St George's Channel off Skomer, Pembrokeshire (51°42′N 5°22′W) with the loss of all 26 crew.

=== 24 December ===
List of shipwrecks: 24 December 1922
Ship	State	Description
Imperial	United States	The two-masted halibut schooner departed Juneau, Territory of Alaska, and was never heard from again.

=== 25 December ===
List of shipwrecks: 25 December 1922
Ship	State	Description
Speedwell	United Kingdom	The coaster ran aground at the mouth of the river Adour, Basses-Pyrénées, France and was wrecked. Her crew were rescued.

=== 26 December ===
List of shipwrecks: 26 December 1922
Ship	State	Description
Santa Rosa	United States	The cargo liner ran aground at Charleston, South Carolina. She was refloated on 31 December.
Tenun Maru	Japan	The cargo ship collided with Mayasan Maru (Japan) off Shiribeshi, Hokkaidō and sank.

=== 27 December ===
List of shipwrecks: 27 December 1922
Ship	State	Description
Admiral Keyes	United Kingdom	The abandoned schooner drifted ashore in the Christianiafjord at Rauer, Norway.
A. G. Eisnor	United Kingdom	The schooner was abandoned in the Atlantic Ocean off the coast of Newfoundland. Her crew were rescued by Frank R. Forsey (United Kingdom).
Glenshee	Norway	The barque ran aground and sank at Arendal, Norway.

=== 28 December ===
List of shipwrecks: 28 December 1922
Ship	State	Description
Vasco	United Kingdom	The cargo ship ran aground off Surop Point, Estonia. She was refloated on 8 January 1923.

=== 29 December ===
List of shipwrecks: 29 December 1922
Ship	State	Description
Attrax	Reichsmarine	The tug foundered in the Baltic Sea whilst on a voyage from Flensburg, Schleswig-Holstein to Kiel.

=== 30 December ===
List of shipwrecks: 30 December 1922
Ship	State	Description
Port Union	United Kingdom	The schooner was destroyed by fire at St. John's, Newfoundland.

=== 31 December ===
List of shipwrecks: 31 December 1922
Ship	State	Description
Orzarossa	Spain	The cargo ship foundered in the Bay of Biscay off La Rochelle, Charente-Maritime. Her crew were rescued.
Pasha Baghtche	Turkey	The passenger ship foundered in the Sea of Marmara off the Princes' Islands with the loss of 20 lives.

=== Unknown date ===
List of shipwrecks: Unknown date 1922
Ship	State	Description
USS B-1	United States Navy	The B-class submarine was sunk as a target.
Vardaas	Norway	The cargo ship ran aground in the last days of December in the Pertuis d'Antioche. She was refloated on 18 January.

== Unknown date ==
List of shipwrecks: Unknown date 1922
Ship	State	Description
Dévastation	French Navy	The ironclad battleship sank off Lorient. She was refloated on 18 April 1927.
Skuratov	Soviet Navy	In 1922, the Soviet icebreaker Skuratov foundered at Cheshskaya Guba in the east Barents Sea.
