= USS B-2 =

B-class submarine of the United States

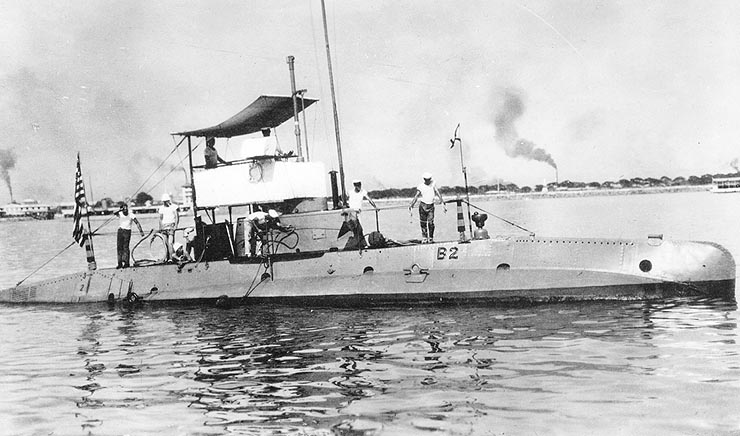
- USS B-2 ex-Viper, off Cavite Navy Yard, the Philippines, c. 1913-1917

History

United States
- Name: Cuttlefish
- Namesake: The cuttlefish
- Builder: Fore River Shipbuilding Company, Quincy, Massachusetts
- Cost: $187,982.32 (hull and machinery)
- Laid down: 30 August 1905
- Launched: 1 September 1906
- Sponsored by: Ms. Eleanor Gow
- Commissioned: 18 October 1907
- Decommissioned: 30 November 1909
- Recommissioned: 15 April 1910
- Decommissioned: 4 December 1912
- Recommissioned: 2 August 1913
- Decommissioned: 12 December 1919
- Renamed: B-2 (Submarine Torpedo Boat No.11), 17 November 1911
- Stricken: 17 January 1922
- Identification: Hull symbol: SS-11 (17 July 1920); Call sign: NDX
- Fate: Sunk as a target

General characteristics
- Class & type: B-class submarine
- Displacement: 145 long tons (147 t) surfaced; 173 long tons (176 t) submerged
- Length: 82 ft 5 in (25.12 m)
- Beam: 12 ft 6 in (3.81 m)
- Draft: 10 ft 7 in (3.23 m)
- Installed power: 250 bhp (190 kW) surfaced; 150 bhp (110 kW) submerged
- Propulsion: 1 × Craig Shipbuilding Company gasoline engine; 1 × Electro Dynamic electric motor; 60-cell battery; 1 × shaft
- Speed: 9 kn (17 km/h; 10 mph) surfaced; 8 kn (15 km/h; 9.2 mph) submerged
- Range: 540 nmi (1,000 km; 620 mi) at 9 kn surfaced; 12 nmi (22 km; 14 mi) at 4 kn (7.4 km/h; 4.6 mph) submerged
- Test depth: 150 ft (46 m)
- Complement: 1 officer; 9 enlisted
- Armament: 2 × 18 inch (450 mm) bow torpedo tubes (4 torpedoes)

USS Cuttlefish/B-2 (SS-11), also known as "Submarine Torpedo Boat No. 11", was one of three B-class submarines built for the United States Navy (USN) in the first decade of the 20th century. She was the first ship of the USN to be named for the cuttlefish, a 10-armed marine mollusk similar to the squid. Used primarily for training, she was transported to the Philippines, in 1913. During WWI she patrolled the waters around the Philippines.

== Design ==
The B-class submarines, also known as the Viper-class, were enlarged versions of the preceding Plunger-class. They had a length of 82 ft 5 in (25.12 m) overall, a beam of 12 ft 6 in (3.81 m), and a mean draft of 10 ft 7 in (3.23 m). They displaced 145 long tons (147 t) on the surface and 173 long tons (176 t) submerged. The B-class boats had a crew of one officer and nine enlisted men. They had a diving depth of 150 feet (45.7 m).

For surface running, they were powered by one 240-brake-horsepower (180 kW) gasoline engine that drove the single propeller shaft. When submerged the propeller was driven by a 115-horsepower (86 kW) electric motor. The boats could reach 9 kn (17 km/h; 10 mph) on the surface and 8 kn (15 km/h; 9.2 mph) underwater. On the surface, they had a range of 540 nmi (1,000 km; 620 mi) at 9 kn and 12 nmi (22 km; 14 mi) at 4 kn (7.4 km/h; 4.6 mph) submerged.

The B-class boats were armed with two 18 inch (450 mm) torpedo tubes in the bow. They carried two reloads, for a total of four torpedoes.

== Construction ==
Cuttlefish was laid down 30 August 1905, in Quincy, Massachusetts, by the Fore River Shipbuilding Company, under a subcontract from Electric Boat Company, of New Suffolk, Long Island. Cuttlefish was launched on 1 September 1906, sponsored by Miss Eleanor Gow; the boat was commissioned on 18 October 1907.

== Service history ==
Cuttlefish reported to the Second Submarine Flotilla, Atlantic Fleet. She operated along the Atlantic coast, running experiments, testing machinery and equipment, and conducting extensive training exercises until going into reserve at Charleston Navy Yard, on 30 November 1909. Recommissioned on 15 April 1910, she served with the Atlantic Torpedo Fleet until joining the Reserve Torpedo Group, at Charleston Navy Yard, on 9 May 1911. The boat was renamed B-2 on 17 November.

B-2 remained in reserve until placed out of commission, on 4 December 1912. On 6 December, she was towed to Norfolk Navy Yard, and loaded onto the collier Ajax, along with her sister ship B-3, for transfer to the Asiatic Station. Sailing via North Atlantic, the Mediterranean Sea, the Suez Canal, and the Indian Ocean, Ajax arrived at Cavite, in the Philippine Islands, on 30 April 1913, and B-2 was launched on 12 May. She was recommissioned on 2 August, and assigned to the Torpedo Flotilla, Asiatic Fleet.

During ensuing operations, she had close brushes with disaster. While the submarine was running submerged to conduct a battery test, soon after arriving in the Philippines, her commander suddenly observed through her periscope the grey side of a ship cross B-2's bow. He dove immediately to avoid a collision, but the submarine's periscope struck an Army ferry on a run from Corregidor to Manila. Although the mishap mangled the periscope rather severely, neither vessel suffered significant damage.

After World War I erupted in Europe during the summer of 1914, B-2's duties were expanded to include patrols to enforce the neutrality of Philippine waters. She also continued to help devise and improve the techniques of submarine operations.

== Fate ==
Her service in the Philippines lasted through the Armistice, though her active career ended 19 months beyond the end of the Great War. B-2 was decommissioned on 12 December 1919, and she was subsequently sunk as a target during destroyer gunnery drills conducted off the entrance to Manila Bay. Her name was struck from the Navy list on 17 January 1922.

== Bibliography ==
- "Table 21 - Ships on Navy List June 30, 1919". Congressional Serial Set. U.S. Government Printing Office: 762. 1921.
- Mohl, Michael. "Cuttlefish / B-2 (SS-11)". Navsource.net.
- Friedman, Norman (1995). U.S. Submarines Through 1945: An Illustrated Design History. Annapolis, Maryland: Naval Institute Press. ISBN 1-55750-263-3.
- Gardiner, Robert & Gray, Randal, eds. (1985). Conway's All the World's Fighting Ships 1906–1921. Annapolis, Maryland: Naval Institute Press. ISBN 0-85177-245-5.
- "B-2 (Submarine Torpedo Boat No. 11)". Dictionary of American Naval Fighting Ships. Navy Department, Naval History and Heritage Command. 1 September 2016. This article incorporates text from this source, which is in the public domain.
