= USS Ajax (AG-15) =

Collier of the United States Navy

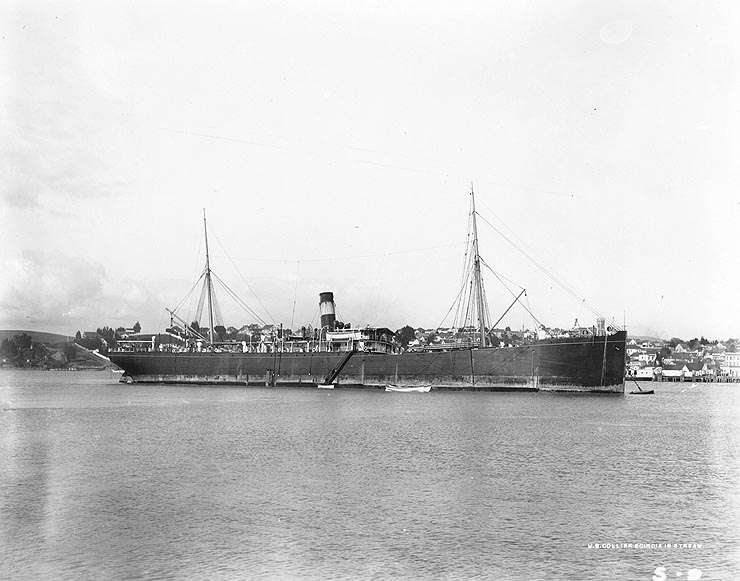
- USS Scindia (1898–1925, later renamed Ajax) Moored in the stream off the Mare Island Navy Yard, California, circa 1899.

History

United States
- Name: USS Ajax
- Builder: D & W Henderson Ltd., Glasgow, Scotland
- Launched: 19 June 1890
- Acquired: by purchase, 12 May 1898
- Commissioned: 21 May 1898, as USS Scindia
- Decommissioned: 8 July 1925
- Renamed: Ajax, 1 January 1901
- Reclassified: AC-14, 17 October 1921; AG-15, 1 July 1924
- Stricken: 8 July 1925
- Fate: Sold, 14 August 1925

General characteristics
- Type: Collier
- Displacement: 9,250 long tons (9,400 t)
- Length: 387 ft 6 in (118.11 m)
- Beam: 24 ft 8 in (7.52 m)
- Draft: 30 ft (9.1 m)
- Speed: 10 kn (12 mph; 19 km/h)
- Complement: 101 officers and enlisted
- Armament: 4 × 6-pounders

USS Ajax (AC-14/AG-15) was a collier in the United States Navy. Originally she retained her previous name of Scindia, and was renamed for the mythical Ajax in 1901. In 1921, she became a receiving ship and was redesignated AC-14. She was reclassified as a seaplane tender and given the hull designator AG-15 in 1924.

The screw steamer Scindia was a steel-hulled freighter built in 1890 by D & W Henderson Ltd., Glasgow, Scotland. Purchased on 12 May 1898—three weeks after the opening of the Spanish–American War—by the U.S. Navy at New York. She was fitted out at the New York Navy Yard for service as a collier, and was placed in commission there on 21 May 1898.

== Service history ==
=== Scindia, 1898–1901 ===
Following a round-trip voyage carrying coal from New York to Guantánamo Bay, Cuba from 2 June – 1 July 1898, the ship departed New York on 12 October with a cargo of coal for the Hawaiian Islands. She made a number of goodwill calls en route—both before and after rounding Cape Horn—and delivered her cargo at Honolulu. Scindia then headed east for the California coast and, after reaching San Francisco Bay early in the spring of 1899, was surveyed at the Mare Island Navy Yard and decommissioned there on 27 May for repairs to her boilers and machinery.

Recommissioned on 23 December 1899, the collier got underway on 18 January 1900 and headed westward across the Pacific and proceeded via Guam to the newly acquired Philippine Islands laden with coal for the ships of the Asiatic Fleet. After unloading at Manila, she transited the Strait of Malacca, crossed the Indian Ocean, and continued on via the Suez Canal and the Strait of Gibraltar to Cardiff, Wales, where she filled her bunkers with coal before crossing the Atlantic to Norfolk, Virginia, where she arrived on 1 March 1901. During her first circumnavigation of Earth, the steamer was renamed Ajax on 1 January 1901. She was decommissioned on 16 March.

=== Ajax, 1901–1909 ===
Reactivated on 16 October 1901, the ship made two more round-the-world voyages carrying coal to the Asiatic Station and then returned to the Philippines in September 1903 for operations with the Asiatic Fleet through the end of 1904. She then returned to the east coast of the United States along which she operated until placed out of service at Norfolk on 4 November 1905.

Reactivated on 20 January 1907, Ajax again served along the east coast until departing Hampton Roads in December of that year to support the cruise of the Great White Fleet around the world to demonstrate the good will of the United States and to make known to any potential enemy the power of the U.S. Navy. She returned to Norfolk on Washington's Birthday in 1909 and, after serving the Atlantic Fleet through the spring, was placed out of service at the Portsmouth Navy Yard in June.

=== 1910–1920 ===
Laid up until 30 April 1910, he put in over two more years supporting the Atlantic Fleet along the coast and in the Caribbean Sea before she was ordered to the Orient for the last time. In December 1912, she took on a cargo of coal at Hampton Roads and loaded the submarines B-2 and B-3 on her decks before sailing via the North Atlantic, the Mediterranean Sea, the Suez Canal, and the Indian Ocean to the Philippine Islands. She arrived in Manila Bay on 30 April 1913, and—after launching her two submarines—began shuttling coal to American warships at ports in such placed as Guam, the Philippines, China, Japan, and even Burma. Soon after the United States entered the World War I, she towed the formerly interned German ship Elsass from Samoa to Honolulu, Hawaii. During the American intervention in Siberia at the end of World War I, she made deliveries to Vladivostok.

=== 1921–1925 ===
The ship was laid up at the Cavite Navy Yard from 20 April-17 October 1921 and then became the receiving ship there for the 16th Naval District and was redesignated AC-14.

During this period, she served briefly in 1923 as tender to the submarines of Submarine Division 18 (SubDiv 18), Asiatic Fleet, and was based at Chefoo, China. After resuming her role as receiving ship at Cavite in September 1923, Ajax became the tender for the seaplanes of the Asiatic Fleet aircraft squadrons in February 1924. On 24 June, naval aviator Commander Albert C. Read assumed command of both Ajax and the aircraft squadrons. On 1 July, she was reclassified as a miscellaneous auxiliary and redesignated AG-15.

Relieved of all duty in June 1925 after the arrival of USS Jason in the Philippines, she was decommissioned on 8 July 1925 and her name was simultaneously stricken from the Naval Vessel Register. The former Ajax was sold at the Cavite Navy Yard to S. R. Paterno on 14 August. S.R. Paterno was apparently a broker or agent for Madrigal as the ship was sold to Madrigal & Co, Manila, one of the larger Philippine shipowners, and renamed "Consuelo" and used in the interisland trade. In 1930 the ship was sold to Fernando Go Chioco of Amoy and renamed "Hua Tong". In 1932 the ship was sold (or transferred) to the newly established Singapore company Hua Khiow Steamship Co (1932) Ltd and in November 1933 the ship was scrapped in China.
