= USS B-1 =

B-class submarine of the United States

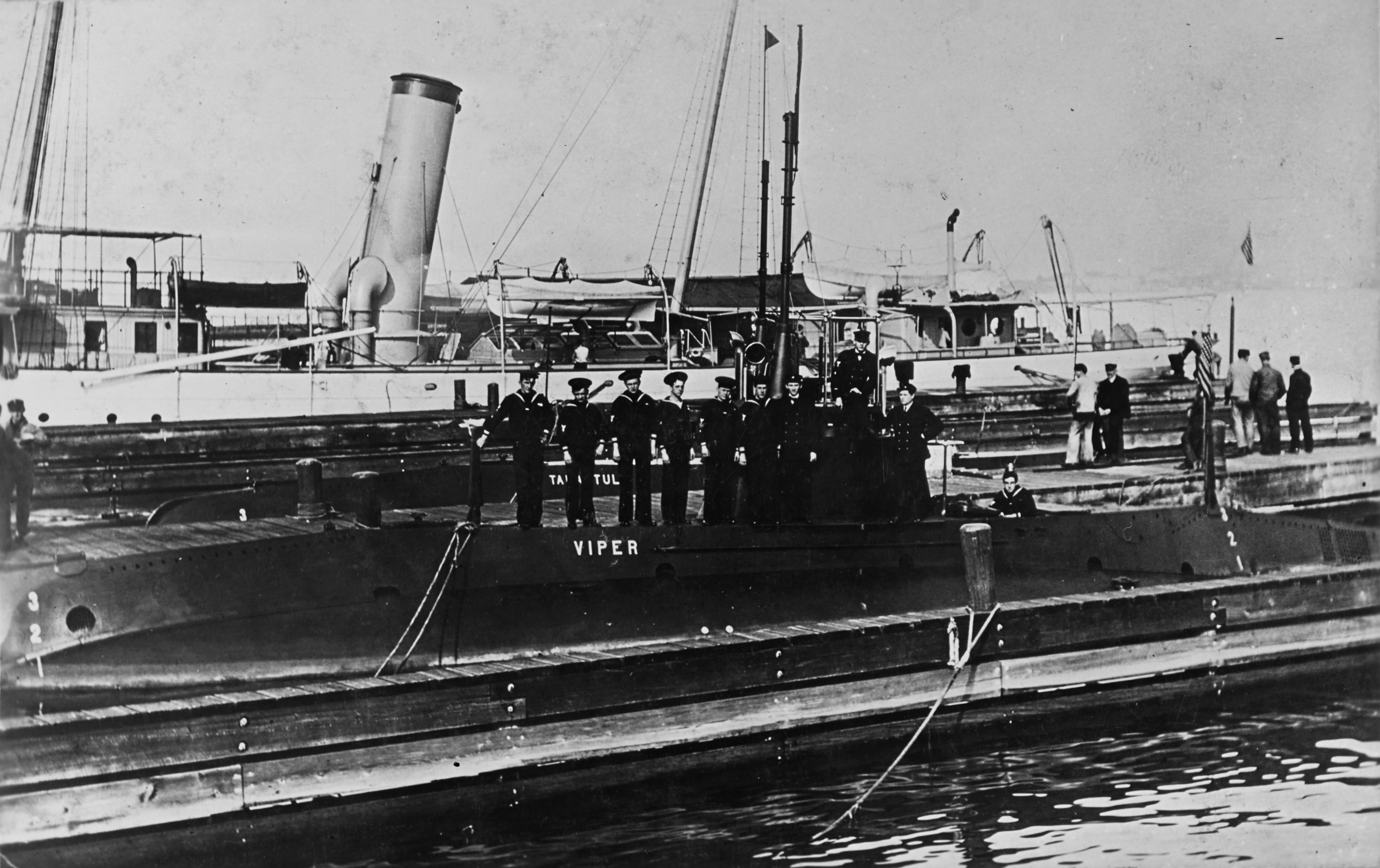
- USS Viper in port, with members of her crew on deck, c. 1907-1911, USS Tarantula is behind her

History

United States
- Name: Viper
- Namesake: The viper
- Builder: Fore River Shipbuilding Company, Quincy, Massachusetts
- Cost: $200,957.48 (hull and machinery)
- Laid down: 5 September 1905
- Launched: 30 March 1907
- Sponsored by: Mrs. Lillian Spear
- Commissioned: 18 October 1907
- Decommissioned: 30 November 1909
- Recommissioned: 15 April 1910
- Decommissioned: 9 May 1911
- Recommissioned: 26 March 1915
- Decommissioned: 1 December 1921
- Renamed: B-1 (Submarine Torpedo Boat No.10), 17 November 1911
- Stricken: 1 December 1921
- Identification: Hull symbol: SS-10 (17 July 1920); Call sign: NVQ
- Fate: Sunk as a target

General characteristics
- Class & type: B-class submarine
- Displacement: 145 long tons (147 t) surfaced; 173 long tons (176 t) submerged
- Length: 82 ft 5 in (25.12 m)
- Beam: 12 ft 6 in (3.81 m)
- Draft: 10 ft 7 in (3.23 m)
- Installed power: 250 bhp (190 kW) surfaced; 150 bhp (110 kW) submerged
- Propulsion: 1 × Craig Shipbuilding Company gasoline engine; 1 × Electro Dynamic electric motor; 60-cell battery; 1 × shaft
- Speed: 9 kn (17 km/h; 10 mph) surfaced; 8 kn (15 km/h; 9.2 mph) submerged
- Range: 540 nmi (1,000 km; 620 mi) at 9 kn surfaced; 12 nmi (22 km; 14 mi) at 4 kn (7.4 km/h; 4.6 mph) submerged
- Test depth: 150 ft (46 m)
- Complement: 1 officer; 9 enlisted
- Armament: 2 × 18 inch (450 mm) bow torpedo tubes (4 torpedoes)

USS Viper/B-1 (SS-10), also known as "Submarine Torpedo Boat No. 10", was the lead ship of her class of submarines built for the United States Navy (USN) in the first decade of the 20th century. She was the third boat of the USN to be named for the viper. Used primarily for training, she was transported to the Philippines, in 1915. During WWI she patrolled the waters around the Philippines.

== Design ==
The B-class submarines, also known as the Viper-class, were enlarged versions of the preceding Plunger-class. They had a length of 82 ft 5 in (25.12 m) overall, a beam of 12 ft 6 in (3.81 m), and a mean draft of 10 ft 7 in (3.23 m). They displaced 145 long tons (147 t) on the surface and 173 long tons (176 t) submerged. The B-class boats had a crew of one officer and nine enlisted men. They had a diving depth of 150 feet (45.7 m).

For surface running, they were powered by one 240-brake-horsepower (180 kW) gasoline engine that drove the single propeller shaft. When submerged the propeller was driven by a 115-horsepower (86 kW) electric motor. The boats could reach 9 kn (17 km/h; 10 mph) on the surface and 8 kn (15 km/h; 9.2 mph) underwater. On the surface, they had a range of 540 nmi (1,000 km; 620 mi) at 9 kn and 12 nmi (22 km; 14 mi) at 4 kn (7.4 km/h; 4.6 mph) submerged.

The B-class boats were armed with two 18 inch (450 mm) torpedo tubes in the bow. They carried two reloads, for a total of four torpedoes.

== Construction ==
Viper was laid down 5 September 1905, in Quincy, Massachusetts, by the Fore River Shipbuilding Company, under a subcontract from Electric Boat Company, of New Suffolk, Long Island. Viper was launched on 30 March 1907, sponsored by Mrs. Lillian Spear, wife of Lawrence York Spear, Vice President of the Holland Torpedo Boat Company. The boat was commissioned on 18 October 1907.

== Service history ==
Viper was assigned to the Second Submarine Flotilla, Atlantic Fleet. She cruised along the Atlantic coast on training and experimental exercises until going into reserve at Charleston Navy Yard, on 30 November 1909. Recommissioned on 15 April 1910, she served with the Atlantic Torpedo Fleet, until assigned to the Reserve Torpedo Group, at Charleston Navy Yard, on 9 May 1911. On 17 November, her name was changed to B-1.

In April 1914, B-1 was towed to the Norfolk Navy Yard, to be overhauled. In 1915, she was loaded aboard the collier Hector, for transport to the Philippine Islands. Arriving at Olongapo, Luzon, on 24 March 1915, B-1 was launched sidewise from the deck of Hector, into Canacao Bay, on 15 April, and recommissioned two days later.

B-1 was assigned to the First Submarine Division, Torpedo Flotilla, Asiatic Fleet on 19 May 1915. Up to that time, the division had consisted solely of somewhat older, smaller and slower, Plunger-class, or A-boats, so the division commander, took command of B-1 as his flagship. Since these early submarines possessed no galleys or berthing accommodations, their officers and men ate and slept in the old monitor Monadnock, which usually rode at anchor off Sangley Point, when not towing targets for the submarines or recovering their torpedoes with her boats.

World War I had broken out in Europe during the previous summer, so B-1 and her division mates carried out patrols to assure that no belligerent warships violated the neutrality of Philippine territorial waters. In addition to such duty, she also joined them in diving tests and torpedo-firing exercises during which they helped to develop the techniques and tactics of submarine warfare.

These operations, even before the United States entered the war, entailed considerable peril. Tremendous pressure could crush B-1's hull like an eggshell if she should dive too deep while operating submerged. Hydrogen gas from her electric batteries or gasoline fumes from her internal-combustion engines could turn a submarine into a giant bomb awaiting a spark. Moreover, the fumes were poisonous, and by intoxicating those who inhale them, could deprive both crew and commander of the sound judgement needed for safe operations. This happened to B-1 in the autumn of 1916, during an attempt to make a submerged, five-hour run in Manila Bay. Lieutenant (jg) Charles A. Lockwood, who had recently relieved the previous commander of the submarine, and who would go on to direct the deadly effective American submarine campaign against the Empire of Japan during World War II, and his crew were deeply affected by gasoline fumes, caused by a leaking fuel line, and were saved from disaster only by B-1's surfacing ahead of schedule.

America's entry into the war in April 1917, had little effect upon B-1's routine. While she never was involved in combat, her operations in the Philippines, by adding to the Navy experience in submerged navigation, helped to develop the submarine force into the highly effective weapon that contributed so greatly to American victory in World War II.

== Fate ==
Following the Armistice, B-1, by then a member of the 2d Submarine Division, continued operations in Philippine waters until decommissioned at Cavite, on 1 December 1921. She was subsequently destroyed as a target during destroyer gunnery practice. Her name was struck from the Navy list, on 16 January 1922.

== Bibliography ==
- "Table 21 - Ships on Navy List June 30, 1919". Congressional Serial Set. U.S. Government Printing Office: 762. 1921.
- Mohl, Michael. "Viper / B-1 (SS-10)". Navsource.net.
- Friedman, Norman (1995). U.S. Submarines Through 1945: An Illustrated Design History. Annapolis, Maryland: Naval Institute Press. ISBN 1-55750-263-3.
- Gardiner, Robert & Gray, Randal, eds. (1985). Conway's All the World's Fighting Ships 1906–1921. Annapolis, Maryland: Naval Institute Press. ISBN 0-85177-245-5.
- "B-1 (Submarine Torpedo Boat No. 10)". Dictionary of American Naval Fighting Ships. Navy Department, Naval History and Heritage Command. 1 September 2016. This article incorporates text from this source, which is in the public domain.
