= United States B-class submarine =

United States Navy submarine class

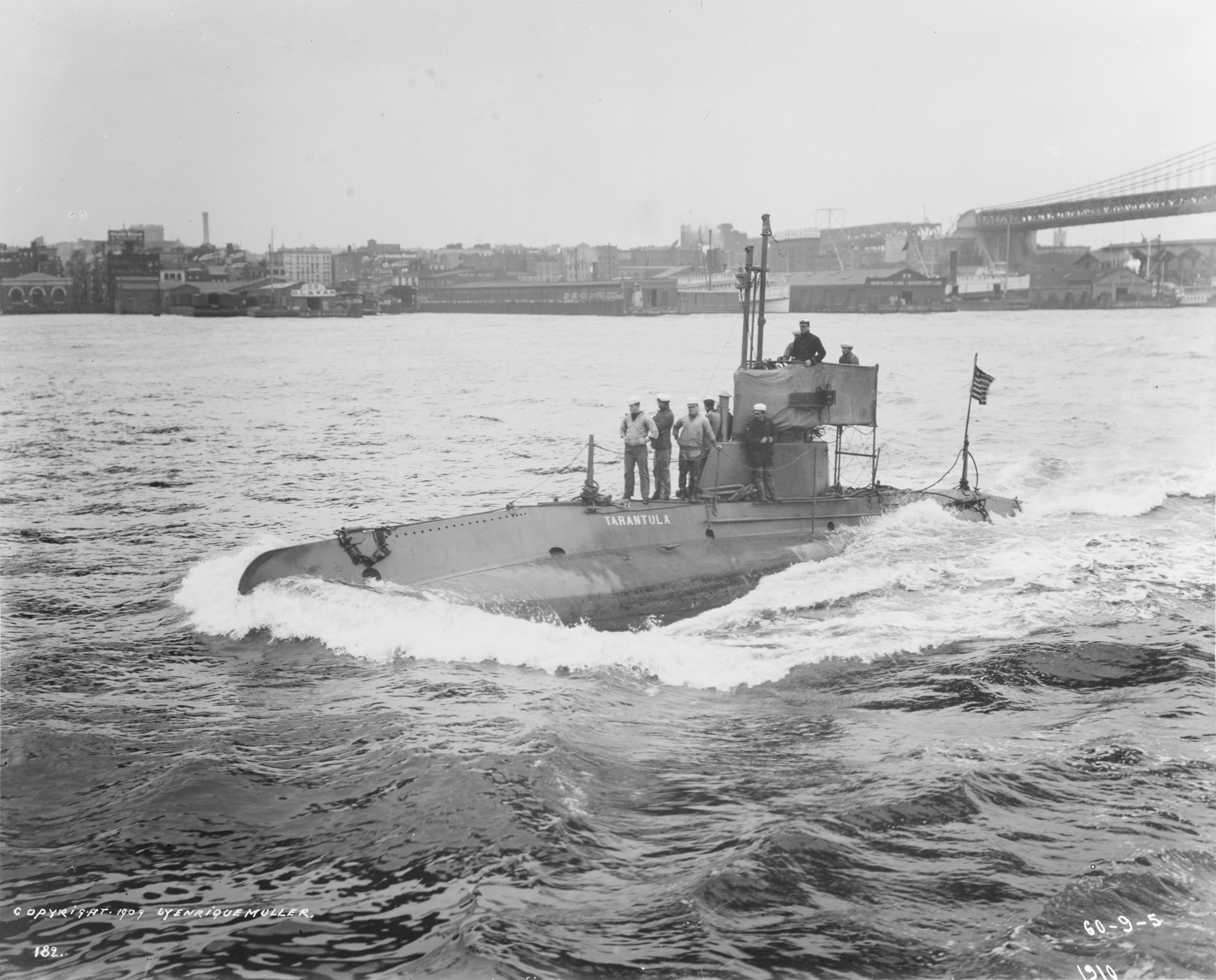
- USS Tarantula, underway near the New York Navy Yard, 1909

Class overview
- Builders: Electric Boat (design); Fore River Shipbuilding, Quincy, Massachusetts
- Operators: United States Navy
- Preceded by: Plunger class
- Succeeded by: C class
- Built: 1906–1907
- In commission: 1907–1921
- Completed: 3
- Retired: 3

General characteristics
- Class & type: midget submarine
- Displacement: 145 long tons (147 t) surfaced; 173 long tons (176 t) submerged
- Length: 82 ft 6 in (25.15 m)
- Beam: 12 ft 6 in (3.81 m)
- Draft: 10 ft 6 in (3.20 m)
- Installed power: 250 bhp (190 kW) surfaced; 150 bhp (110 kW) submerged
- Propulsion: 1 × Craig Shipbuilding Company gasoline engine; 1 × Electro Dynamic electric motor; 60-cell battery; 1 × shaft
- Speed: 9 kn (17 km/h; 10 mph) surfaced; 8 kn (15 km/h; 9.2 mph) submerged
- Range: 540 nmi (1,000 km; 620 mi) surfaced; 12 nmi (22 km; 14 mi) submerged
- Test depth: 150 ft (46 m)
- Complement: 1 officer; 9 enlisted
- Armament: 2 × 18 inch (450 mm) bow torpedo tubes (4 torpedoes)

The B-class submarines were three United States Navy submarines built by the Fore River Shipbuilding Company, in Quincy, Massachusetts, under a subcontract from the Electric Boat Company. They were eventually stationed in the Philippines, an American possession, beginning in 1912–1915. They were shipped there on colliers. All three were stricken and expended as targets 1919–1922.

== Design ==
These were the last submarines designed directly by John Philip Holland. In a series of business organizational moves, Holland had essentially been forced out of Electric Boat, by Isaac Rice and Elihu Frost, and he resigned from the company on 28 March 1904. They were also the last submarines in the US Navy with a single, axial mounted propeller until the experimental submarine Albacore, of 1953.

These vessels introduced some features intended to increase underwater speed, including a small sail and a rotating cap over the torpedo tube muzzles. The streamlined torpedo tube muzzle cap eliminated the drag that muzzle holes would otherwise cause. In the stowed position, the submarine appears to have no torpedo tubes, as the holes in the cap are covered by the bow stem. With the exception of the L-class and the one-off M-1, this feature remained standard for submarines designed by the Electric Boat Company through the O-class, after which it was replaced with individual muzzle doors faired with shutters that remain standard through the modern day.

For extended surface runs, the small sail was augmented with a temporary piping-and-canvas structure (see photo). Tactical doctrine for harbor defense submarines dictated that quick "crash dives" would not be necessary, thus the considerable time it took to dismantle this structure and stow it below was not considered a liability. Experience in World War I showed that this was inadequate in the North Atlantic weather, and earlier submarines serving overseas in that war (E, K, and L-classes) had their bridge structures augmented with a "chariot" shield on the front of the bridge. Starting in 1918–1919, with lessons learned from overseas experience US submarines had bridges more suited to surfaced operations in rough weather.

== Boats in class ==
The following ships of the class were constructed.

Construction data
Ship name	Hull class and no.	Builder	Laid down	Launched	Comm.	Decomm.	Renamed	Rename date	Reclass. hull no.	Reclass. hull no. date	Fate
Viper	Submarine No. 10	Fore River Shipyard, Quincy, Massachusetts	5 September 1905	30 March 1907	18 October 1907	1 December 1921	B-1	17 November 1911	SS-10	17 July 1920	Sunk as a target
Cuttlefish	Submarine No. 11	Fore River Shipyard, Quincy, Massachusetts	30 August 1905	1 September 1906	18 October 1907	12 December 1919	B-2	17 November 1911	SS-11	17 July 1920	Sunk as a target
Tarantula	Submarine No. 12	Fore River Shipyard, Quincy, Massachusetts	5 September 1905	30 March 1907	3 December 1907	25 July 1921	B-3	17 November 1911	SS-12	17 July 1920	Sunk as a target

== Sources ==
- Friedman, Norman "US Submarines through 1945: An Illustrated Design History", Naval Institute Press, Annapolis:1995, ISBN 1-55750-263-3.
- Gardiner, Robert, Conway's All the World's Fighting Ships 1906–1921 Conway Maritime Press, 1985. ISBN 0-85177-245-5.
- Goldstone, Lawrence "Going Deep: John Philip Holland and the Invention of the Attack Submarine", Pegasus Books, New York:2017, ISBN 978-1-68177-429-9.
- Silverstone, Paul H., U.S. Warships of World War I (Ian Allan, 1970), ISBN 0-71100-095-6.
- Wright, C. C. (2003). "Question 40/02: Submarines Expended as Targets 1922". Warship International. XL (4): 286–298. ISSN 0043-0374.
