= SS Aeolus =

A number of steamships were named Aeolus, including –

- SS Aeolus (1882), a German cargo ship in service 1904–16
- SS Aeolus (1884), a Swedish coaster that was damaged by fire in 1927
- SS Aeolus (1899), an American ocean liner in service 1919–22
- SS Aeolus (1943), a German Hansa A type cargo ship in service 1943–45
