= SS Lyman Stewart =

Steam tanker built in 1914

Coordinates: 37°46′42.3″N 122°30′58.2″W

History

United States
- Name: Lyman Stewart
- Namesake: Lyman Stewart
- Owner: Union Oil Company
- Builder: Union Iron Works Co., San Francisco
- Yard number: 116
- Laid down: 4 May 1914
- Launched: 31 October 1914
- Sponsored by: Miss Dorothy May Stewart
- Commissioned: 26 December 1914
- Maiden voyage: 26 December 1914
- Home port: San Francisco
- Identification: US Official Number 212860; Code letters LFBW
- Fate: Wrecked, 7 October 1922

General characteristics
- Type: Tanker
- Tonnage: 6,054 GRT; 3,830 NRT; 10,200 DWT
- Displacement: 13,960 tons (loaded)
- Length: 408.8 ft (124.6 m)
- Beam: 55.5 ft (16.9 m)
- Draft: 27 ft 0 in (8.23 m) (loaded)
- Depth: 31.7 ft (9.7 m)
- Installed power: 534 Nhp, 3,000 ihp
- Propulsion: Union Iron Works Co. 3-cylinder triple expansion
- Speed: 11 knots (13 mph; 20 km/h)

Lyman Stewart was a steam tanker built in 1914 by Union Iron Works Company of San Francisco for the Union Oil Company of California, with intention of transporting oil and petroleum products to ports along the West Coast of the United States and Canada. The ship was named after Lyman Stewart, the president of the Union Oil Co. In October 1922 the tanker collided with another steamer, SS Walter Luckenbach, and was beached to avoid sinking but was subsequently declared a total loss.

== Design and construction ==
Early in 1914 Union Oil Co. decided to add a large tanker of approximately 10,000 deadweight tonnage to its existing fleet of chartered vessels, expanding their oil carrying business. A contract for this vessel was awarded to the Union Iron Works Co. and Lyman Stewart was laid down at the builder's shipyard in San Francisco on 4 May 1914 (yard number 116) and launched on 31 October 1914, with Miss Dorothy May Stewart, daughter of Lyman Stewart, the president of the Union Oil Co., serving as the sponsor. The ship was shelter-deck type, had two main decks and was built on the Isherwood principle of longitudinal framing providing extra strength to the body of the vessel. The ship was equipped with wireless made by Federal Wireless Company and had electric lights installed along the decks. The tanker had a cargo pump room with two duplex pumps, and had her hold subdivided into sixteen cargo tanks fitted for carrying oil in bulk with a total capacity of approximately 63,694 barrels. In addition, the 'tween decks were designed for carriage of refined oil.

As built, the ship was 408.0 feet (124.4 m) long (between perpendiculars) and 55.5 feet (16.9 m) abeam, and had a depth of 31.7 feet (9.7 m). Lyman Stewart was originally assessed at 6,054 GRT and 3,830 NRT and had deadweight tonnage of approximately 10,200. The vessel had a steel hull with double bottom, and a single 534 Nhp (3,000 ihp) vertical triple expansion steam engine, with cylinders of 26 1/2-inch (67 cm), 45-inch (110 cm) and 75-inch (190 cm) diameter with a 48-inch (120 cm) stroke, that drove a single screw propeller and moved the ship at up to 11 knots (13 mph; 20 km/h). The steam for the engine was supplied by four single-ended Scotch marine boilers fitted for oil fuel.

The sea trials were held at the end of December 1914 off the Golden Gate during which the vessel performed satisfactorily and was transferred to her owners upon their completion.

== Operational history ==
After delivery to Union Oil the tanker departed San Francisco for Port San Luis, the major oil storage and shipping facility for Union Oil on 26 December 1914, arrived there next day and returned to San Francisco on December 29 with cargo of oil completing her maiden voyage. Following her first trip, the tanker entered the coastal trade transporting oil and various petroleum products from Union Oil terminals at Port San Luis and Port Harford to ports in the Pacific Northwest such as Seattle, Vancouver, Victoria and Port Moody. For example, she carried 56,000 barrels of fuel oil to Vancouver in September 1915. In addition, during her first two years of service the tanker made occasional trips to Central America as a replacement for lost tanker Elsinore. For example, in July 1915 Lyman Stewart transported nearly 60,000 barrels of fuel oil to Nicaragua and Panama. She also made several trips in later years to Hawaiian Islands. For example, in February 1917 the vessel brought nearly 60,000 barrels of fuel oil as well as drums of gasoline and distillate to Hilo.

Due to her frequent trips to Canada the ship crew members were often involved in drug smuggling. In June 1920 it was reported that the quartermaster of Lyman Stewart was jailed for trying to bring in more than $1,000 worth of cocaine which he acquired in Chinatown in Vancouver.

Starting in 1920 in addition to transporting oil from Port San Luis, the ship started carrying refined oil products from Oleum and San Pedro to the same ports in the Pacific Northwest. During one of such trips on 1 September 1920 Lyman Stewart was on her passage from San Francisco for Seattle with a cargo of 60,000 barrels of fuel oil and 6,000 barrels of gasoline. At about 23:00 while travelling in heavy fog she collided off Fort Bragg with Standard Oil tanker SS Richmond on her return trip from Seattle to Los Angeles. Richmond suffered by far heavier injuries and had to put into port of San Francisco with about 4 feet of water in her holds. Lyman Stewart suffered minor damage and was able to continue on her trip up north. Richmond was assessed the next day and put into drydock for repairs that lasted until September 9 and cost over US$25,000. After return from her trip, Lyman Stewart also was put into drydock and had her bow plates replaced.

=== Sinking ===
Lyman Stewart departed for her last voyage from Martinez in the early afternoon of 7 October 1922 carrying 1,018,332 US gallons (24,246 barrels) of gasoline consigned to Shell Oil Company in addition to approximately 45,000 barrels of oil bound for Richmond Beach. The tanker was under command of captain John G. Cloyd and had a crew of thirty eight men. The tanker was proceeding out to sea through the northern San Francisco Bay and then via Raccoon Strait travelling at a speed of approximately 9 knots (10 mph; 17 km/h). After reaching Point Covallo she ran into a heavy fog bank and reduced her speed down to 6.5 to 7 knots (7.5 to 8.1 mph; 12.0 to 13.0 km/h). The sea was smooth and the tide was at half ebb with the current being 3 to 4 knots (3.5 to 4.6 mph; 5.6 to 7.4 km/h) out to sea. At the same time steamer SS Walter A. Luckenbach under command of captain George A. Benner and piloted by captain John A. Norberg with general cargo from Boston and New York was entering the Golden Gate from westerly direction. After reaching Mile Rock at about 15:06, the freighter reduced her speed to approximately 9.8 knots (11.3 mph; 18.1 km/h) and continued to her destination. At about 15:19 she encountered a strong eddy current somewhere around Fort Point and attempted to correct her course. As Lyman Stewart was trying to round Lime Point at the entrance into the Golden Gate, the strong tide current took her slightly south of the mid channel. At approximately 15:23 a lookout on the tanker suddenly spotted a large ship coming out of the fog at about two full ship lengths away. Captain Cloyd ordered to put the engines full astern but due to very short distance between the vessels, it was too late to avoid the collision. Walter A. Luckenbach struck Lyman Stewart on her port bow just aft of the forepeak and plowed in over 15 feet, with the gash extending both above and below the water line. The vessels remained together until 15:29, when due to current they drifted apart and separated, with the tanker beginning to fill very rapidly. In order to maintain buoyancy, captain Cloyd ordered to pump out cargo from the bow holds. In the meantime wireless distress signals were sent out and picked up by four shore stations. Several tugs, boats and US Coast Guard cutter Tulare were immediately dispatched to the site of the incident but could not immediately locate the vessels due to heavy fog. After separating, the two vessels drifted back toward Mile Rock until about 15:46 when the steamship SS F. S. Loop arrived at the scene and inquired if any assistance was required, while Walter A. Luckenbach left the scene and proceeded to port with her bow smashed and holed. Immediately after the impact captain Cloyd ordered his crew to abandon ship which they did in orderly fashion in three lifeboats. The captain together with seven officers remained on board the tanker and tried to beach her to avoid sinking. Lyman Stewart initially grounded on Mile Rock but was dragged off by the waves and slowly drifted down the coastline shadowed by F. S. Loop until she went ashore near Point Lobos, not far from Seal Rock at around 16:10. An attempt to refloat the tanker was made on October 9 but it proved to be unsuccessful due to precarious ship position on the rocks and flooded engine room. Further attempts were made to dislodge the vessel, but due to rough weather and deteriorating condition of the tanker the underwriters decided to abandon the salvage work and on October 17 declared Lyman Stewart total wreck.

The wreck was sold for US$6,100 at auction to the Bethlehem Shipbuilding Corp. at the end of October 1922, but the bid was rejected by the underwriters because they wanted the tanker to be broken up and sold for scrap instead of refloating. Subsequently, early in November the wreck was acquired by captain Thomas P. H. Whitelaw for US$2,500 who attempted to start the salvage work at the end of the month. No real salvage work, however, was performed with exception of securing most valuable parts of the engine and putting cables on the ship. In addition, captain Whitelaw constructed a bridge over to the wreck making it a tourist destination. Plans were made to refloat the vessel in April or May 1923 but they went unfulfilled. In early September 1923 it was reported the ship was breaking up on the rocks, with her stern being completely broken, and more work was done to remove some parts of the tanker but she was never refloated.

In November 1925 an attempt was made to remove remaining cargo of oil and gasoline from the steamer tanks. The first try proved to be successful, and approximately 20,000 gallons of gasoline was recovered and eventually sold to a taxicab company. On the second attempt however, the barge used to store the cargo was broken into pieces during a gale stopping any further recovery work. In November 1926 Lyman Stewart broke in two and remained in her beached position until completely broken up and demolished by the wind and the waves.
