= USS B-3 =

B-class submarine of the United States

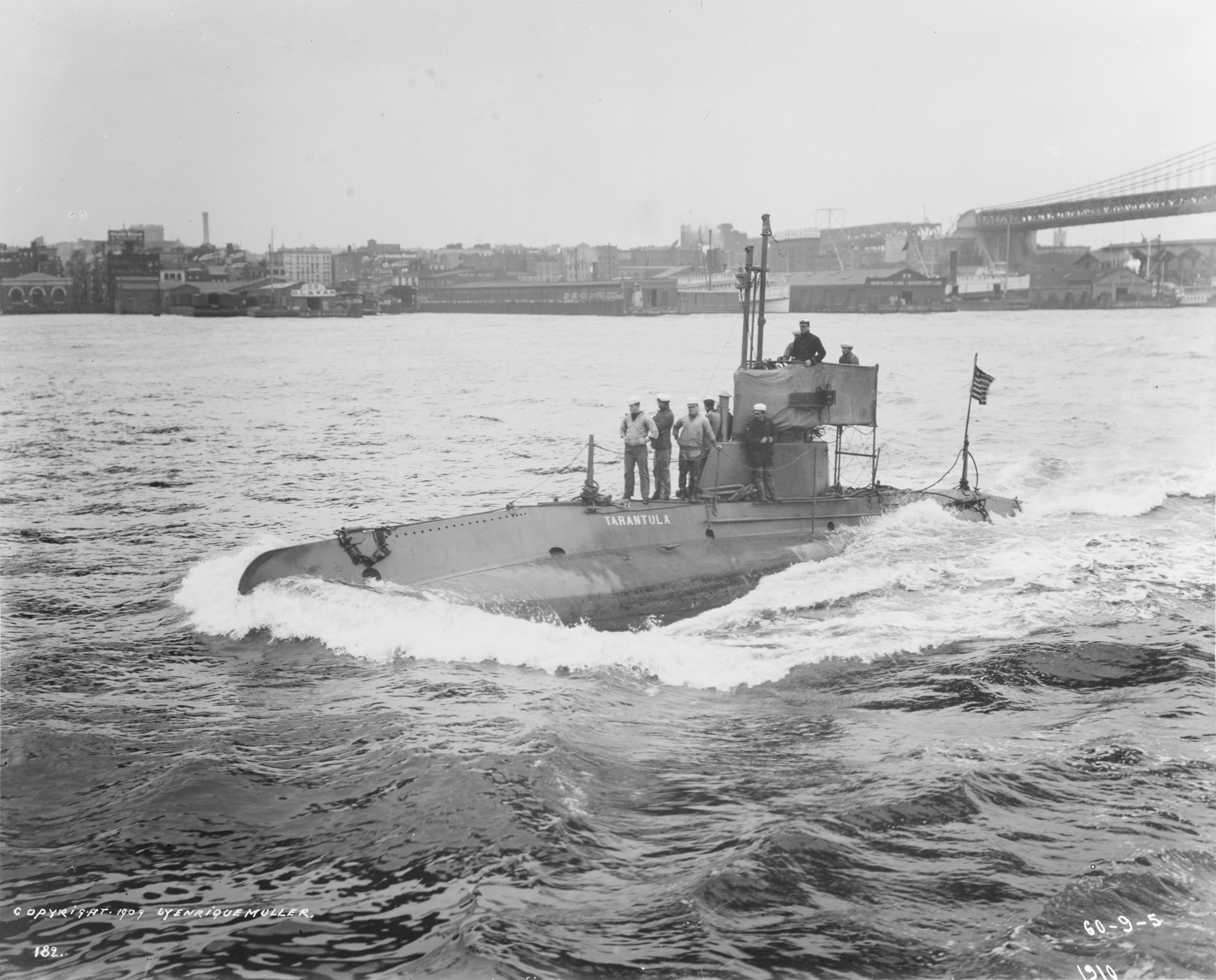
- USS Tarantula, underway near the New York Navy Yard, 1909

History

United States
- Name: Tarantula
- Namesake: The tarantula
- Builder: Fore River Shipbuilding Company, Quincy, Massachusetts
- Cost: $185,077.84 (hull and machinery)
- Laid down: 5 September 1905
- Launched: 30 March 1907
- Sponsored by: Mrs. George S. Radford
- Commissioned: 3 December 1907
- Decommissioned: 6 November 1909
- Recommissioned: 15 April 1910
- Decommissioned: 4 December 1912
- Recommissioned: 2 September 1913
- Decommissioned: 25 July 1921
- Renamed: B-3 (Submarine Torpedo Boat No.12), 17 November 1911
- Stricken: 17 January 1922
- Identification: Hull symbol: SS-12 (17 July 1920); Call sign: NUD
- Fate: Sunk as a target

General characteristics
- Class & type: B-class submarine
- Displacement: 145 long tons (147 t) surfaced; 173 long tons (176 t) submerged
- Length: 82 ft 5 in (25.12 m)
- Beam: 12 ft 6 in (3.81 m)
- Draft: 10 ft 7 in (3.23 m)
- Installed power: 250 bhp (190 kW) surfaced; 150 bhp (110 kW) submerged
- Propulsion: 1 × Craig Shipbuilding Company gasoline engine; 1 × Electro Dynamic electric motor; 60-cell battery; 1 × shaft
- Speed: 9 kn (17 km/h; 10 mph) surfaced; 8 kn (15 km/h; 9.2 mph) submerged
- Range: 540 nmi (1,000 km; 620 mi) at 9 kn surfaced; 12 nmi (22 km; 14 mi) at 4 kn (7.4 km/h; 4.6 mph) submerged
- Test depth: 150 ft (46 m)
- Complement: 1 officer; 9 enlisted
- Armament: 2 × 18 inch (450 mm) bow torpedo tubes (4 torpedoes)

USS Tarantula/B-3 (SS-12), also known as "Submarine Torpedo Boat No. 12", was one of three B-class submarines built for the United States Navy (USN) in the first decade of the 20th century. She was the first boat of the USN to be named for the tarantula, a group of large, and often hairy, spiders of the family Theraphosidae. Used primarily for training, she was transported to the Philippines, in 1913. During WWI she patrolled the waters around the Philippines.

== Design ==
The B-class submarines, also known as the Viper-class, were enlarged versions of the preceding Plunger-class. They had a length of 82 ft 5 in (25.12 m) overall, a beam of 12 ft 6 in (3.81 m), and a mean draft of 10 ft 7 in (3.23 m). They displaced 145 long tons (147 t) on the surface and 173 long tons (176 t) submerged. The B-class boats had a crew of one officer and nine enlisted men. They had a diving depth of 150 feet (45.7 m).

For surface running, they were powered by one 240-brake-horsepower (180 kW) gasoline engine that drove the single propeller shaft. When submerged the propeller was driven by a 115-horsepower (86 kW) electric motor. The boats could reach 9 kn (17 km/h; 10 mph) on the surface and 8 kn (15 km/h; 9.2 mph) underwater. On the surface, they had a range of 540 nmi (1,000 km; 620 mi) at 9 kn and 12 nmi (22 km; 14 mi) at 4 kn (7.4 km/h; 4.6 mph) submerged.

The B-class boats were armed with two 18 inch (450 mm) torpedo tubes in the bow. They carried two reloads, for a total of four torpedoes.

== Construction ==
Tarantula was laid down 5 September 1905, in Quincy, Massachusetts, by the Fore River Shipbuilding Company, under a subcontract from Electric Boat Company, of New Suffolk, Long Island. Tarantula was launched on 30 March 1907, sponsored by Mrs. George S. Radford; the boat was commissioned on 4 December 1907.

== Service history ==
Tarantula reported to the Atlantic Fleet, and operated along the Atlantic coast, with the First and Second Submarine Flotillas, on training and experimental exercises until going into reserve at Charleston Navy Yard, on 6 November 1909. She was recommissioned on 15 April 1910, and served with the Atlantic Torpedo Fleet until assigned to the Reserve Torpedo Group, Charleston Navy Yard, on 9 May 1911, and placed out of commission on 4 December 1912. On 17 November, Tarantula was renamed B-3.

On 6 December 1912, B-3 was towed to Norfolk Navy Yard, and loaded onto the collier Ajax, along with her sister ship B-2, for transfer to the Asiatic Station. Arriving at Cavite, in the Philippine Islands, on 30 April 1913, B-3 was launched from Ajax on 12 May. She was recommissioned on 2 September and remained in the Philippines where she served with Submarine Division 4, Torpedo Flotilla, Asiatic Fleet.

Excerpts from the autobiography of Captain C.Q. Wright, indicate he was the "Officer in Charge" of B3 at Cavite. His crew launched the two subs off the deck of the Ajax. They then retrofitted the gasoline powered engines and motors in the Cavite Navy Yard shop readying the subs for a 48-hour shakedown cruise. The first tour of duty began with sealed orders at 1900 hours, guarding Manila Bay's Naval Base Manila, in the event hostilities broke out with the Empire of Japan. Orders were to sink any Japanese war vessel that came into sight, although none did.

In 1914, B-3 was awarded the "Battle Efficiency Pennant" for the best operating submarine in the US fleet, Commanding Officer Ensign C.Q. Wright.

After World War I broke out in Europe early in the summer of 1914, she carried out patrols to prevent belligerent warships from violating the neutrality of Philippine waters until the United States entered the conflict in the spring of 1917. Then, through the Armistice, she continued much the same work, ostensibly to protect the archipelago from the Imperial German Navy, a force that long before had been driven from the oceans.

== Fate ==
Decommissioned at Cavite, on 25 July 1921, B-3 was subsequently sunk as a target. Her name was struck from the Navy list on 17 January 1922.

== Bibliography ==
- "Table 21 - Ships on Navy List June 30, 1919". Congressional Serial Set. U.S. Government Printing Office: 762. 1921.
- Priolo, Gary. "Tarantula / B-3 (SS-12)". Navsource.net.
- Friedman, Norman (1995). U.S. Submarines Through 1945: An Illustrated Design History. Annapolis, Maryland: Naval Institute Press. ISBN 1-55750-263-3.
- Gardiner, Robert & Gray, Randal, eds. (1985). Conway's All the World's Fighting Ships 1906–1921. Annapolis, Maryland: Naval Institute Press. ISBN 0-85177-245-5.
- "B-3 (Submarine Torpedo Boat No. 12)". Dictionary of American Naval Fighting Ships. Navy Department, Naval History and Heritage Command. 20 August 2024. This article incorporates text from this source, which is in the public domain.
