= USS Moccasin (SS-5) =

Plunger-class submarine of the United States

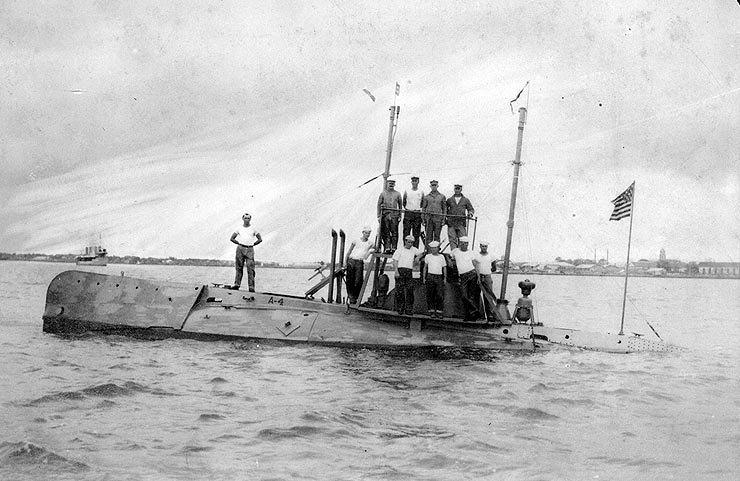
- USS A-4, ex-Moccasin, in Manila Bay, c. 1912

History

United States
- Name: Moccasin
- Namesake: The moccasin
- Builder: Crescent Shipyard, Elizabethport, New Jersey
- Laid down: 8 November 1900
- Launched: 20 August 1901
- Sponsored by: Mrs. Rice
- Commissioned: 17 January 1903
- Decommissioned: 15 June 1904
- Recommissioned: 10 February 1910
- Decommissioned: 12 December 1919
- Renamed: A-4 (Submarine Torpedo Boat No.4), 17 November 1911
- Stricken: 16 January 1922
- Identification: Hull symbol: SS-5 (17 July 1920); Call sign: NKG

General characteristics
- Class & type: Plunger-class submarine
- Displacement: 107 long tons (109 t) surfaced; 123 long tons (125 t) submerged
- Length: 63 ft 10 in (19.46 m)
- Beam: 11 ft 11 in (3.63 m)
- Draft: 10 ft 7 in (3.23 m)
- Installed power: 160 bhp (120 kW) surfaced; 150 bhp (110 kW) submerged
- Propulsion: 1 × Otto Gas Engine Works gas engine; 1 × Electro Dynamic electric motor; 60-cell battery; 1 × shaft
- Speed: 8 kn (15 km/h; 9.2 mph) surfaced; 7 kn (13 km/h; 8.1 mph) submerged
- Test depth: 150 ft (46 m)
- Complement: 1 officer; 6 enlisted
- Armament: 1 × 17.7 in (450 mm) "18-in" torpedo tube (5 torpedoes)

USS Moccasin/A-4 (SS-5), also known as "Submarine Torpedo Boat No. 5", was one of seven Plunger-class submarines built for the United States Navy (USN) in the first decade of the 20th century. Named for the Moccasin. She served as a training boat before being transported to the Philippines for harbor defense during WWI.

== Design ==
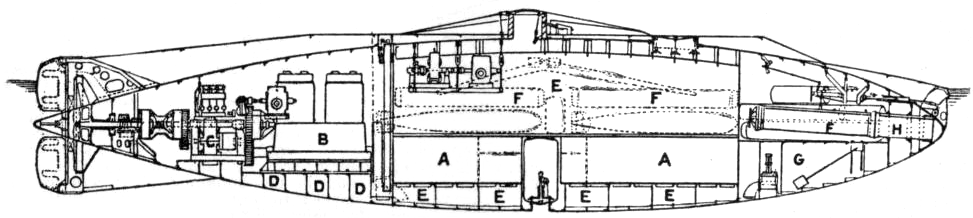
Plan of Plunger-class. A, storage batteries; B, gas-engine; C, dynamo and motor; D, water-tight compartments; E, main ballast tanks; F, air-flasks; G, gasolene tank; H, expulsion tube.

The Plunger-class submarines were enlarged and improved versions of the preceding Holland, the first submarine in the USN. They had a length of 63 ft 10 in (19.5 m) overall, a beam of 11 ft 11 in (3.6 m) and a mean draft of 10 ft 7 in (3.2 m). They displaced 107 long tons (109 t) on the surface and 123 long tons (125 t) submerged. The Plunger-class boats had a crew of one officer and six enlisted men. They had a diving depth of 150 feet (45.7 m).

For surface running, they were powered by one 180-brake-horsepower (134 kW) gasoline engine that drove the single propeller. When submerged the propeller was driven by a 70-horsepower (52 kW) electric motor. The boats could reach 8 kn (15 km/h; 9.2 mph) on the surface and 7 kn (13 km/h; 8.1 mph) underwater.

The Plunger-class boats were armed with one 18-inch (457 mm) torpedo tube in the bow. They carried four reloads, for a total of five torpedoes.

== Construction ==
Moccasin was laid down on 8 November 1900, in Elizabethport, New Jersey, at the Crescent Shipyard, by Lewis Nixon, a subcontractor for the Holland Torpedo Boat Company, New York City; launched on 20 August 1901; sponsored by a Mrs. Rice; and commissioned on 17 January 1903, at the Holland Torpedo Boat Station, at New Suffolk, New York.

== Service history ==
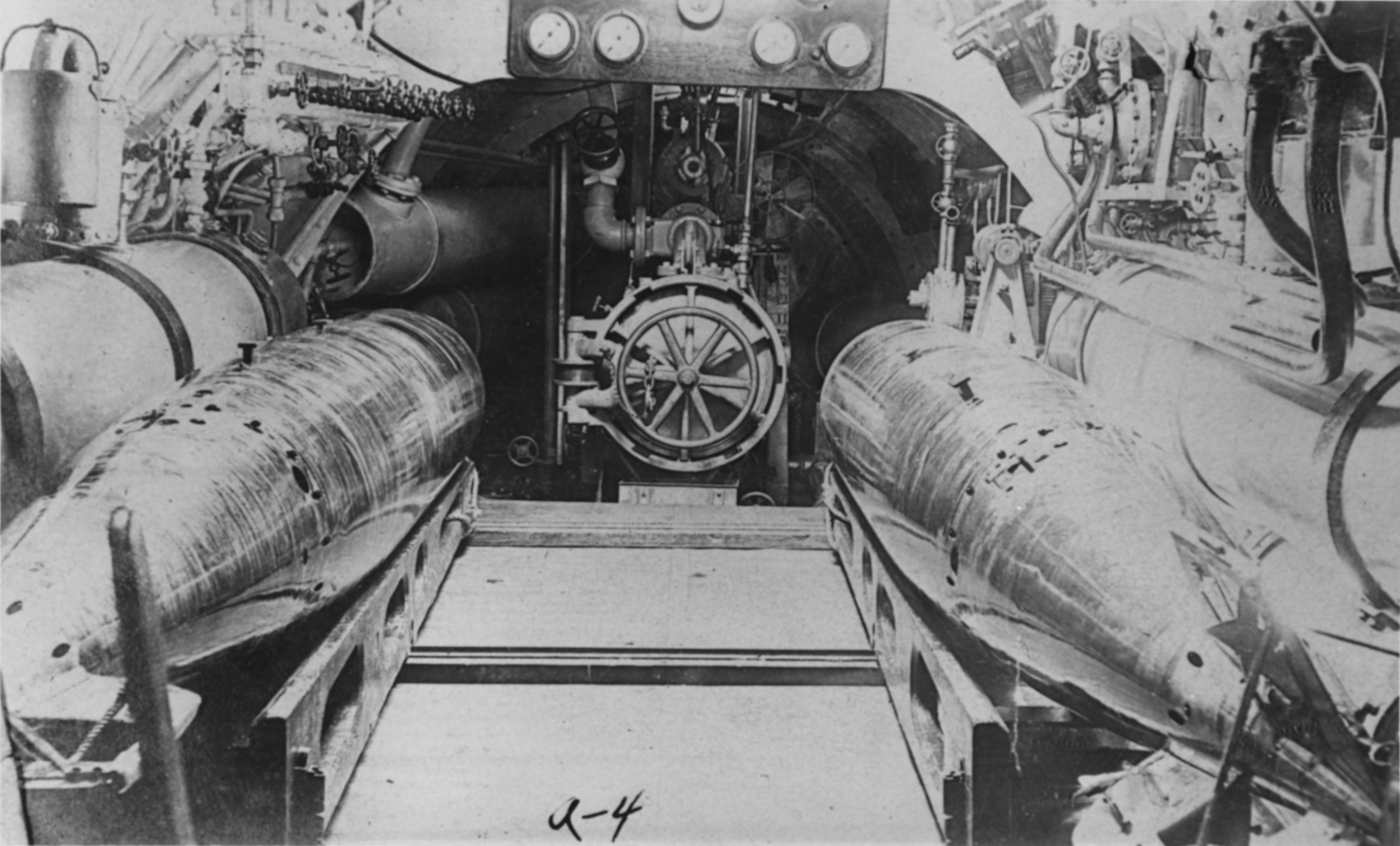
A 1912 view of the breech of the sole torpedo tube of A-4. Two torpedoes are on wooden skids in the foreground. The skids slid across the deck for loading.

Assigned to duty at the Naval Torpedo Station at Newport, Moccasin operated locally on principally training and experimental activities until assigned to the Reserve Torpedo Flotilla at Norfolk on 15 June 1904, in which unit she remained inactive for the next half decade.

=== Grounding ===
The submarine ran aground in North Carolina's outer banks in late 1903, and was several miles away from the Wright Brothers' inaugural flight on 17 December 1903.

=== Transfer to Asiatic Fleet ===
On 20 July 1909, the submarine torpedo boat was loaded onto the collier Caesar, which sailed soon thereafter for the Philippines. Moccasin's sister ship, Adder, was on board as deck cargo as well, lashed to the auxiliary's forward well deck. Arriving at Olongapo, on 1 October, Moccasin was launched on 7 October. Recommissioned on 10 February 1910, she was assigned to the First Submarine Division, Asiatic Torpedo Fleet, based in the Manila area.

Early in the period she was operating with the Asiatic Fleet, Moccasin was renamed A-4, on 17 November 1911. During World War I, like her sister ships, she patrolled the entrance to Manila Bay, and convoyed ships moving out of local waters.

== Fate ==
Later placed in reserve, A-4 was decommissioned at Cavite, on 12 December 1919. Designated as a target vessel, A-4, which had been assigned the identification number SS-5 on 17 July 1920, was stricken from the Naval Vessel Register on 16 January 1922.

== Bibliography ==
- Mohl, Michael. "Moccasin / A-4 (SS-5)". Navsource.net.
- "A-4 (Submarine Torpedo Boat No. 5)". Dictionary of American Naval Fighting Ships. Navy Department, Naval History and Heritage Command. 31 August 2016. This article incorporates text from this source, which is in the public domain.
- Friedman, Norman (1995). U.S. Submarines Through 1945: An Illustrated Design History. Annapolis, Maryland: Naval Institute Press. ISBN 1-55750-263-3.
- Gardiner, Robert & Gray, Randal, eds. (1985). Conway's All the World's Fighting Ships 1906–1921. Annapolis, Maryland: Naval Institute Press. ISBN 0-85177-245-5.
- Price, Scott. "The Indispensable Men: The U.S. Life Saving Service & the Wright Brothers, Kitty Hawk, North Carolina, 1903" (PDF). United States Department of Defense.
- Crouch, Tom (1989). The Bishop's Boys (1st ed.). New York, NY: Norton. p. 267. ISBN 0-393-30695-X.
