= Holland Torpedo Boat Company =

First submarine builder for US Navy

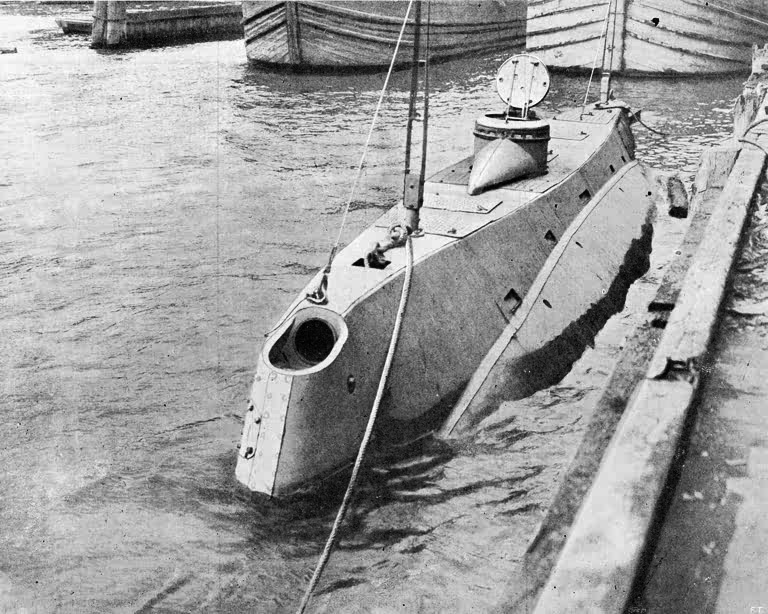
- Type: Subsidiary starting 1899
- Industry: Shipbuilding
- Founded: 1893
- Founder: John Philip Holland
- Defunct: February 21, 1952 into General Dynamics
- Headquarters: New York City, New York, United States
- Key people: Lewis Nixon, Elihu B. Frost, Lawrence York Spear, Arthur Leopold Busch, Frank Cable, Isaac Rice
- Products: Submarines
- Parent: Electric Boat Company starting 1899
- Footnotes; Designed and built the first practical submarine

Holland Torpedo Boat Company was founded by John Philip Holland (1841–1914) in 1893. Holland was an Irish engineer-inventor, who designed and built the first practical submarine. His Holland VI was renamed USS Holland (SS-1), and became the US Navy's first submarine. In 1899, the Holland Torpedo Boat Company became part of the Electric Boat Company.

== Background ==
Holland was inspired to work with submersibles after reading Jules Verne's novel Twenty Thousand Leagues Under the Seas published in 1870 and reading about the American Civil War battle between the ironclads Monitor and Virginia. Being born and raised in Liscannor on the North Atlantic Ocean and Limerick, a sea town on the River Shannon both in Ireland, Holland grew up with mariners life around him. At Christian Brothers College, a science teacher persuaded him to pursue designs of a submarine in 1859. His early drafts became the model for his later designs. His two brothers and mother emigrated to Boston in 1872 and Holland joined them in 1873. Holland got a job at an engineering firm, then moved to teaching at St. John's Catholic School in Paterson, New Jersey, till 1881. While at St. John's Catholic School, he designed a three-man submarine that he hoped the US Navy would what to build. In 1875 Holland submitted submarine designs to the U.S. Navy, but was turned down.

== History ==
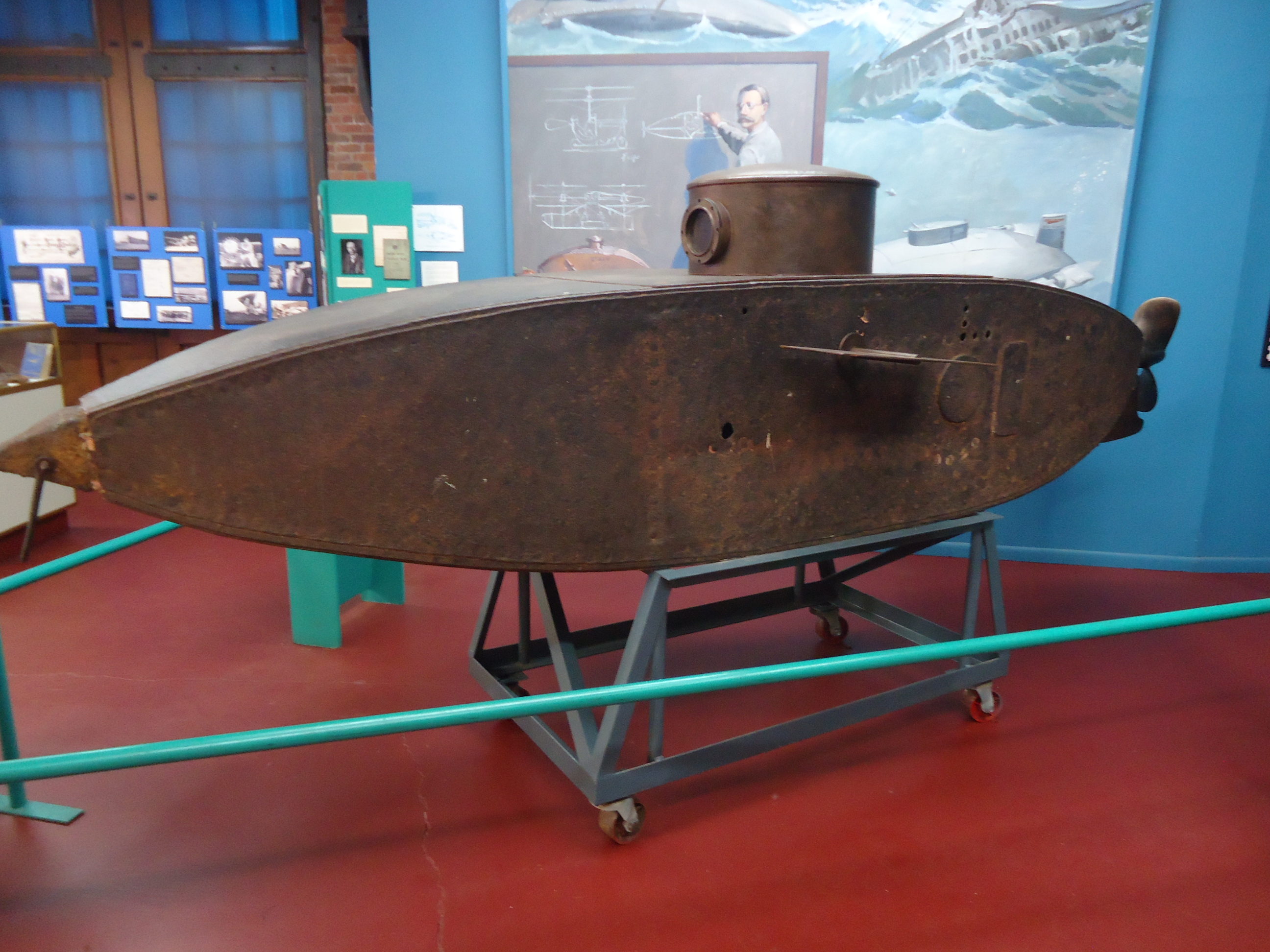
Boat No. 1 launched May 22, 1878,

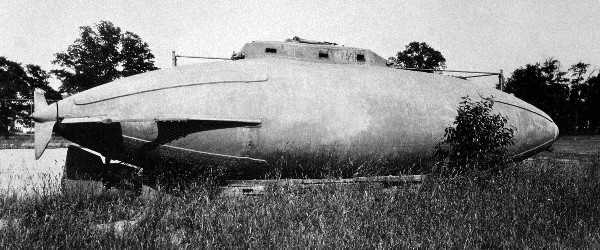
Fenian Ram at the Clason Point Military Academy, Bronx, NY, sometime between 1916 and 1927

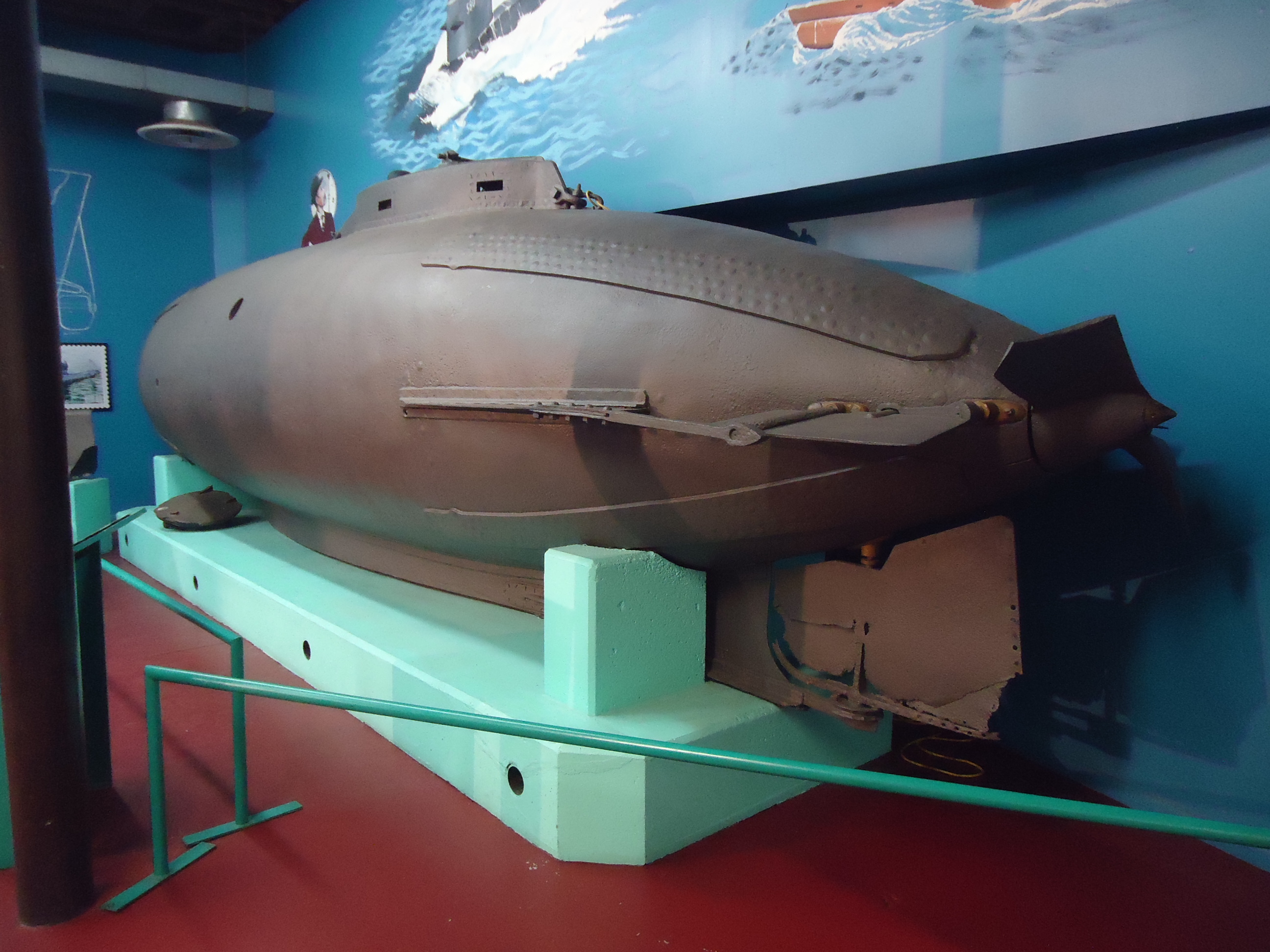
Fenian Ram on display at the Paterson Museum, New Jersey (2016)

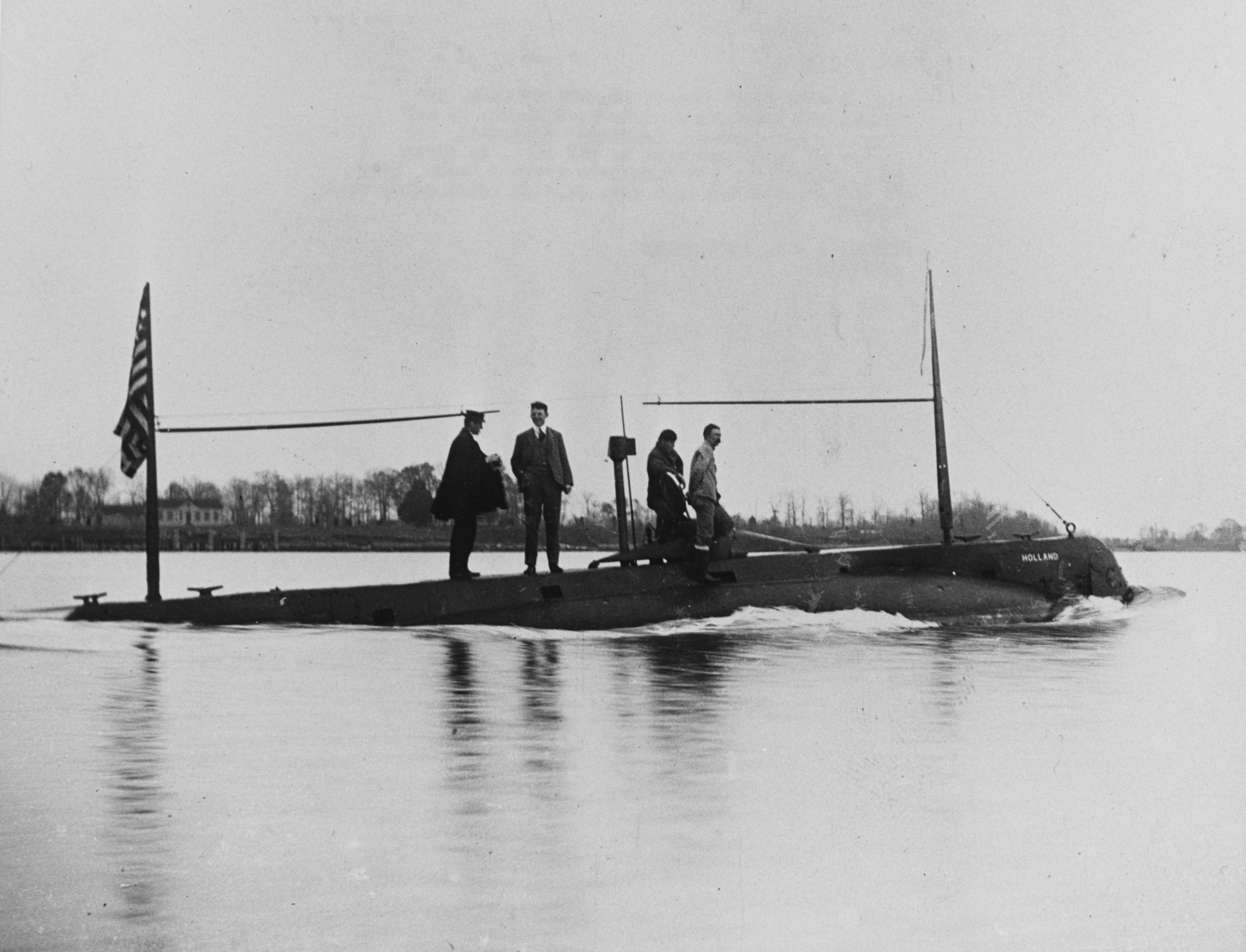
USS Holland (SS-1) underway

Holland had meetings with the Fenian Brotherhood, an Irish republican organization that was founded in 1858 in the United States. The Fenian Brotherhood hoped to use the submarines in their fight for freedom against England. The Brotherhood agreed to fund three submarines. After seeing Holland's prototype surface and dive off Coney Island, the Fenian Brotherhood invested in the Holland Torpedo Boat Company. With the funds, Holland built at Todd & Raftery's shop at Paterson, New Jersey, a one-man submarine Boat No. 1 launched May 22, 1878, with press coverage. Boat No. 1 was 14 feet (4.3 m) long, weighed 2.25 tons, and was powered by a 4-horsepower Brayton internal combustion engine driving a single screw. Holland tested and then sank Boat No. 1 on the Passaic River after he completed his test in 1878. The scuttled sub was raised in 1927 and is a museum ship at the Paterson town museum.

With the success of Boat No. 1, the Fenian Brotherhood, through John Devoy, funded deploying a weapon system submarine. Holland left his teaching job at St. John's Catholic School and worked full-time on a new submarine. The press nicknamed Holland 's next submarine the Fenian Ram, which was John Holland's Holland Boat No. II. Fenian Ram—built at Delamater Iron Works in New York City—was launched in 1881 with a 9-inch (229 mm) pneumatic gun that fired forward out of her bow. Fenian Ram had sea trial in the Long Island Sound. Fenian Ram could dive and surface using rudder planes. Fenian Ram had a top speed of 9 mph (14 km/h) on the surface and 7 mph (11 km/h) underwater. The US Navy looked at Fenian Ram and Holland's 16 feet early design, but were not ready to buy.

Holland launched in 1883, a prototype 16-foot (4.9 m) sub, Holland III. Holland III was a smaller (third scaled-down) version of Fenian Ram, Holland used her for testing dives.

Fenian Brotherhood with the Irish Republican Brotherhood had payment disputes with Holland and they stole Fenian Ram and Holland III from Holland in November 1883. Holland III sank while being towed away. Unable to operate Fenian Ram the brotherhood kept at in storage and she later became a museum ship.

Holland built Holland IV, also called the Zalinski Boat, an experimental submarine built for and financed by United States Army lieutenant Edmund Zalinski in 1885. For the project, Holland founded the Nautilus Submarine Boat Company. For cost saving Holland only made wooden hull submarines.

Holland started the Holland Torpedo Boat Company in 1893 after the US Navy showed interest in a design, with Navy changes. The Navy awarded the submarine contract to Holland in 1895. Others had bid on the Navy submarine contracts, including George Baker, Thorsten Nordenfelt and Josiah Tuck.

With the loss of Fenian Brotherhood funding, Holland was able to raise private funding due to press coverage of the first three boats. Holland's next boat was the Holland VI, launched May 17, 1897, later renamed USS Holland (SS-1) after being sold to the US Navy for $150,000 (half the production cost). Holland VI was launched on May 17, 1897. The Navy bought Holland VI as she could travel underwater on batteries powering an electric motor that drove the propeller. The Navy purchased the sub on April 11, 1900, and commissioned the submarine on October 12, 1900. Battery-powered submarines would be the standard till nuclear-powered submarine became the standard. The Holland VI was built with Lewis Nixon, owner of the Crescent Shipyard in Elizabeth, New Jersey, where Holland VI was built. Holland VI was 53 feet (16 m) long. The US Navy ordered six more USS Holland class submarines.

Before building Holland VI Holland had built an 1895 prototype, called Plunger. Plunger was steam-powered submarine constructed at the Columbian Iron Works, Baltimore, Maryland which was built after winning a Navy bid for a "submarine torpedo boat". Plunger was canceled in April 1900 and never completed, as steam power would not work well in submarines. .

In the process of raising private funding, Holland partnered with businessman Isaac Rice. Rice was working with a battery company, Electric Storage, at the time Holland and Rice met. Rice helped in the final funding of Holland VI. Rice also had worked on electric automobiles.

== Electric Boat Company ==
Rice incorporated a new company, the Electric Boat Company on February 7, 1899, and the Holland Company became a major subsidiary of the Electric Boat Company. With the change, some stockholders of Holland stock were able to convert their shares in Holland stock to Electric Boat Company's preferred share. Rice became president of both Electric Boat Company and Holland Torpedo Boat Company with the change. Rice incorporated the Electric Boat Company to be the financial company to build the new submarines for the US Navy and in the process took over Holland's company. Rice had John Holland assigned as manager of the company he had started. The Electric Boat Company's Washington DC legal counsel was Charles Creecy. Charles Morris continued as the superintending submarine engineer. The Secretary and treasurer of both companies was Elihu B. Frost. John Holland thus became just an employee in the company he founded.

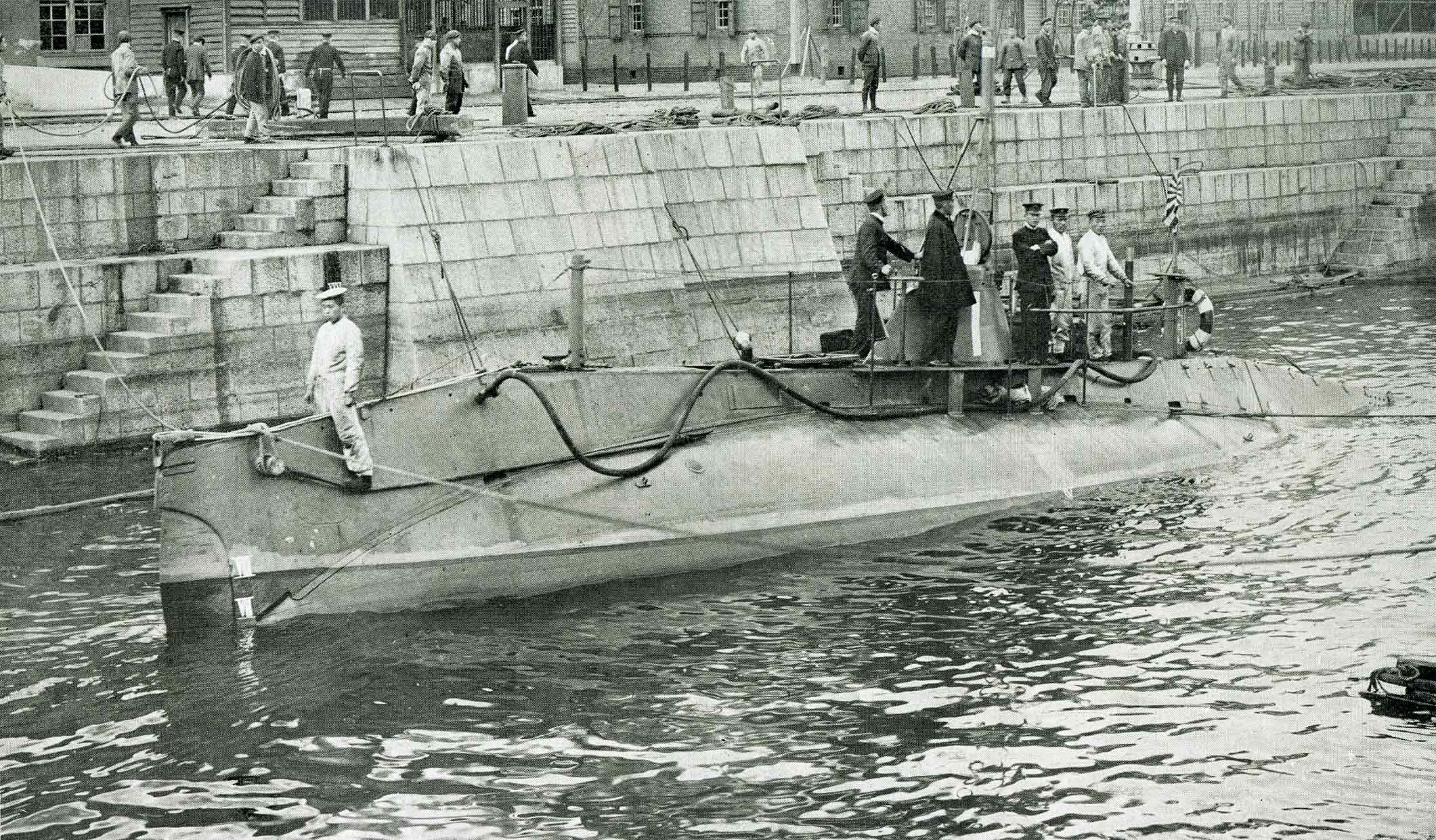
Holland 1-class submarine Japan purchased during the Russo Japanese War

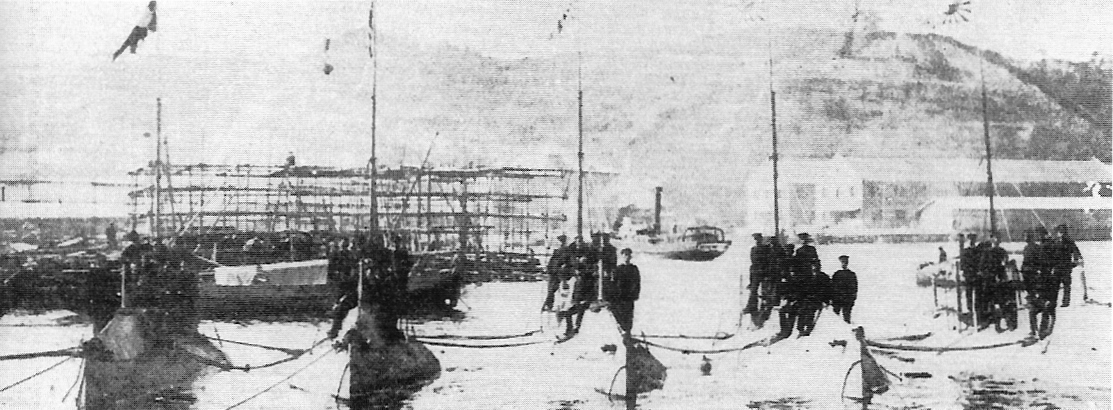
Japan's first fleet of submarines (Nos. 1 to 5, all John Philip Holland designs), assembled by Arthur Leopold Busch in the Naval Review of October 1905.

In 1899, the Electric Launch Company (Elco) also became a subsidiary of the Electric Boat Company.

To test the new submarines and train its crews, the Electric Boat Company opened the Holland Torpedo Boat Station in 1899 located in the community of Hamlet in New Suffolk, New York. A Whitehead torpedo was added to the submarine Holland at the Station on 20 August 1899 for training. The Holland Torpedo Boat Station closed in 1905 as the Navy was now training its own crews. The USS Holland was based at Hamlet's Holland Torpedo Boat Station from 1899 to 1905. Seven submarines built by the Holland Torpedo Boat Company – Electric Boat Company were stationed at Hamlet. Holland Torpedo Boat Station at Cutchogue Harbor was not designated a submarine base by the US Navy. The US Navy gave that title to Naval Submarine Base New London as the first submarine base. Naval Submarine Base New London was commissioned by the US Navy in 1916 as a dedicated submarine base.

The Electric Boat Company built HMS Holland 1 the first Royal Navy submarine. HMS Holland 1 was launched on October 2, 1901. Holland Torpedo Boat Company subcontracted submarine construction to the Fore River Shipyard in Quincy, Massachusetts and other shipyards.

Japan ordered five Holland submarines, Type 7-P, that they used against Russia in the Russo-Japanese War of 1904 to 1905. Type 7-P was 67 feet (20 m) long and had a diameter of 11 feet 10.5 inches (3.620 m) and a displacement of 123 tons. Holland was awarded the Rising Sun honor by the Emperor of Japan.

== Holland Torpedo Boat Station Submarines ==
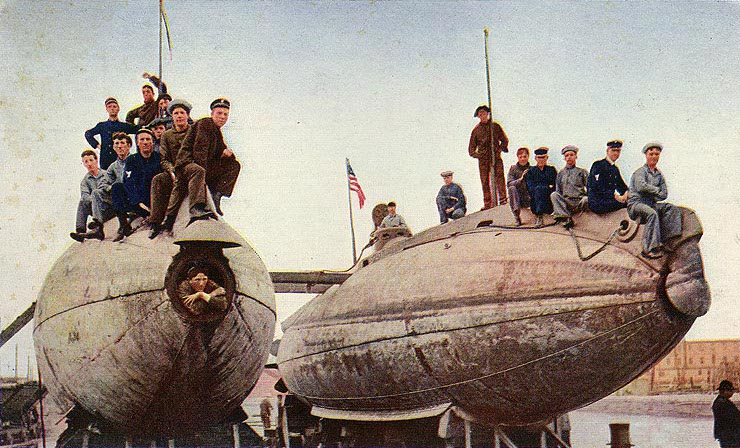
The USS Porpoise (SS-7) and USS Shark (SS-8) in 1905

- USS Holland (SS-1), launched 1897, museum ship in 1913, scrapped 1932
- USS Plunger (1895) was an experimental steam submarine, canceled in April 1900 prior to completion, scrapped 1917.

The six Plunger-class submarines, launched from 1901 to 1903, that were stationed and tested at Holland Torpedo Boat Station:

- USS Plunger (SS-2) / A-1, launched 1902, scrapped 1922
- USS Adder A-2, launched 1901, sunk as target 1920
- USS Moccasin A-4, launched 1901, sunk as target 1921
- USS Porpoise A-6, launched 1901, sunk as target 1921
- USS Shark A-7, launched 1901, sunk as target 1921
  - Plunger-class submarines that were built and stationed in San Francisco, California:
  - USS Pike A-5, launched 1903, sunk as target 1921
  - USS Grampus A-3, launched 1902, sunk as target 1921

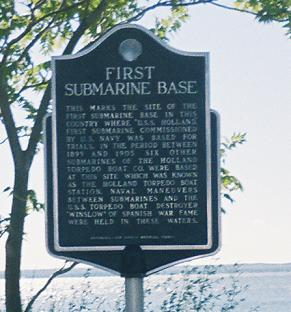
Plaque stating New Suffolk, New York's claim to be the first submarine base.

=== Holland Torpedo Boat Station Historical Marker ===
The First Submarine Base Historical Marker reads: "This marks the site of the first submarine base in this country where 'U.S.S. Holland', first submarine commissioned by the U.S. Navy was based for trials. In the period between 1899 and 1905 six other submarines of the Holland Torpedo Boat Co. were based at this site which was known as the Holland Torpedo Boat Station. Naval maneuvers between submarines and the U.S.S. torpedo boat destroyer 'Winslow' of the Spanish War fame were held in these waters."
Erected by Cutchogue-New Suffolk Historical Council.
Located at Main Street at Cutchogue Harbor in Hamlet, New Suffolk, New York.

== Next generation submarines ==
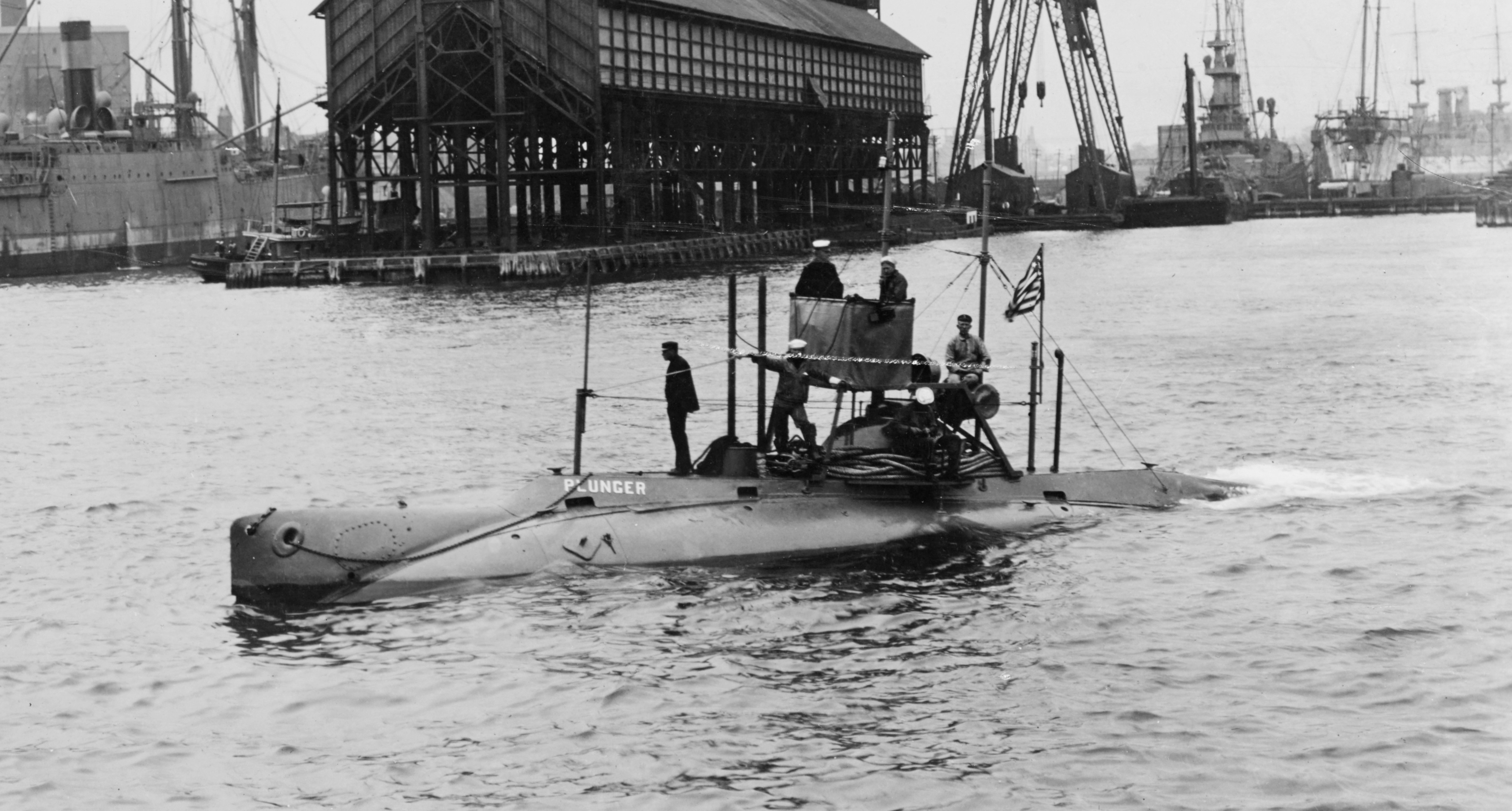
USS Plunger (SS-2) in Brooklyn, N.Y. in 1909

With the success of USS Holland submarines, the Holland Torpedo Boat Company was awarded a contract for the next generation of submarines, the A class called the Plunger class submarines. Between 1900 and 1903 seven Plunger-class submarines were built.

The Holland Torpedo Boat Company built a series of submarines after the Plunger class each with some improvements:

- Three B-class submarines built between 1906 and 1907.
- Five the C-class submarines built between 1906 and 1909.
- Three D-class submarines built between 1911 and 1912.
- Two E-class submarines built between 1909 and 1910.
- Two F-class submarines built between 1911 and 1912.
- Four G-class submarines built between 1909 and 1913.
- Nine H-class submarine built between 1911 and 1918. The H-class submarine was also called the Holland 602 type submarine, which was sold to other nations.
- Eight K-class submarines built between 1912 and 1914.

== End of Holland–Nixon partnership ==
The K-class was the last submarine that Holland worked on, ending the 19-year partnership with Nixon that started in 1895. Holland died on August 12, 1914, at age 74 in Newark, New Jersey. Holland is interred at the Holy Sepulchre Cemetery in the city of Totowa, New Jersey. Holland died poor and his grave had no headstone for many years. On October 11, 1976, a large headstone was placed on his grave. At the October 11, 1976 ceremony was, Chief Willard Clewall Sr., a retired Navy officer and a veteran that was a crew member on a Holland submarine in 1908. Later a new headstone with Holland photo was placed on the grave. The 1976 headstone was shipped to Holland's home town of Liscannor. In Liscannor, Ireland a commemorating plaque was built in 1964, the city placed it there on the 50th anniversary of Holland's death. In the city of Liscannor, Castle Street was renamed Holland Street in Holland's honor. Holland married Margaret T. Foley (1862–1920) in 1887, and they had three children. In New Suffolk, Long Island, on April 8, 2000, a new Holland monument was dedicated to the first US Submarine Base, US Navy Submarine Veterans place the monument at the site of the Holland Torpedo Boat Station. The John P. Holland Centre, a centre dedicated to the life and work of Holland, was opened in Liscannor in 2016.

== Post-Holland submarines ==
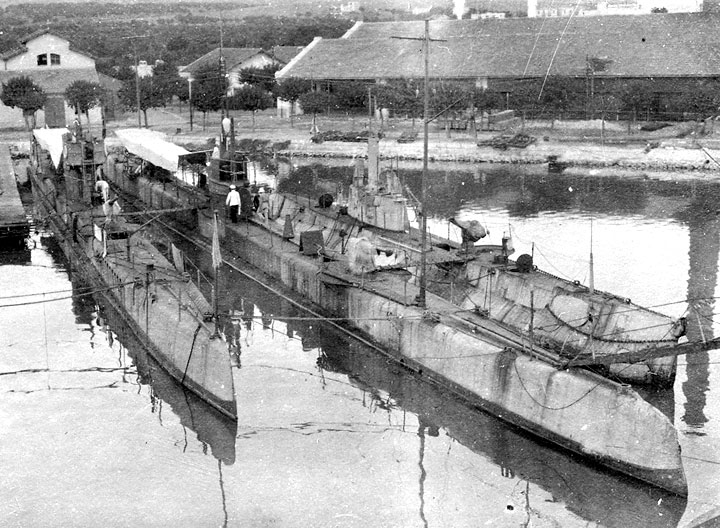
Holland 602 type Russian submarine AG-22 (on the right) in Bizerte in 1922

Following the K-class submarines was the one M-class submarine built in 1914–1915. Following the M-Class submarine were three AA-1-class submarines built between 1916 and 1922. The AA-1-class submarines were followed by seven N-class submarines built between 1915 and 1917. Following the N-class submarines were 16 O-class submarines built between 1916 and 1918. Following the O-class submarines were 27 R-class submarines built between 1917 and 1919. R-class submarines were also sold to the Peruvian Navy and Royal Navy. Following the R-class submarines were 51 S-class submarines built between 1918 and 1925. Following the S-class submarines were nine V-boat–class submarines built between 1921 and 1934. V-1 through V-3 were known as Barracuda and V-5 and V-6 were known as Narwhal.

The Russian submarine AG-22 was an AG-class Holland-class submarine, designed by the Holland Torpedo Boat Company and built for the Imperial Russian Navy during World War I.

== World War II submarines ==
Some pre-war submarines were used in World War II and some were recommissioned and put into service due to the high demand.

  - World War II submarines classes:
- Dolphin^{S} one launched 1932, scrapped in 1946
- Argonaut^{S} one launched 1927, sunk 1943
- Cachalot two built from 1931 to 1934, both Scrapped in 1947
- Porpoise ten built from 1933 to 1937
- Salmon six built from 1936 to 1938
- Sargo ten built from 1937 to 1939
- Tambor 12 built from 1939 to 1941
- Mackerel two built from 1939 to 1941
- Gato 77 built from 1940 to 1944, sold to other allied nations also
- Balao 120 built from 1942 to 1996, sold to other allied nations also
- Tench 29 built from 1944 to 1951, sold to other allied nations also

== Post World War II ==
- Barracuda-class submarine three built from 1949 to 1951
- Tang-class submarine six built from 1949 to 1952
- Darter class one built in 1954

== General Dynamics ==
On February 21, 1952, the Electric Boat Company was reorganized as General Dynamics Corporation under John Jay Hopkins, with Electric Boat as a major subsidiary. General Dynamics continued to build submarines for the US Navy.

Under General Dynamics, a series of nuclear-powered submarines were built, starting with the first the USS Nautilus (SSN-571).

== Gallery ==
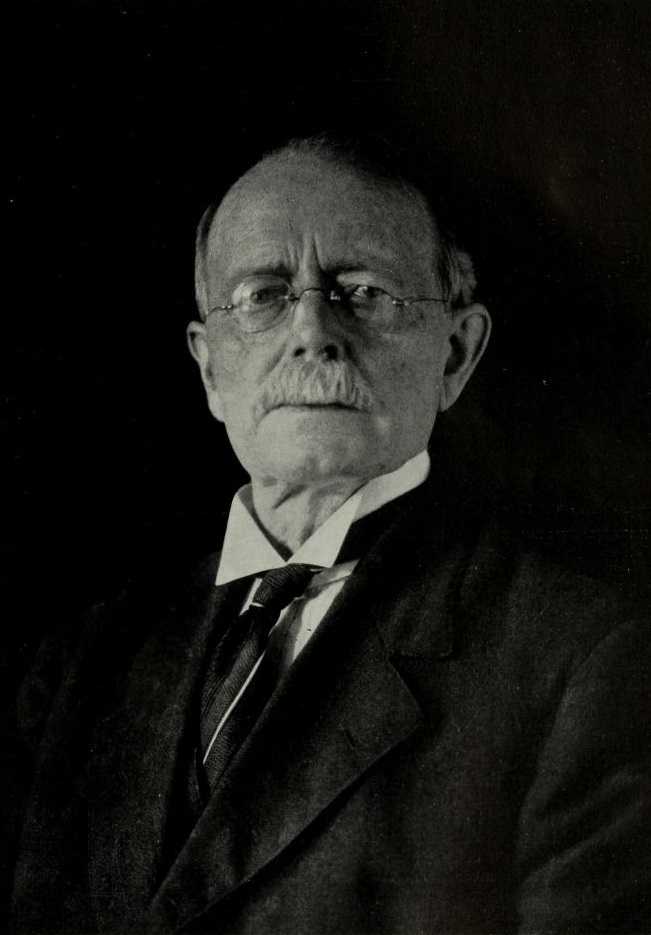
John Philip Holland

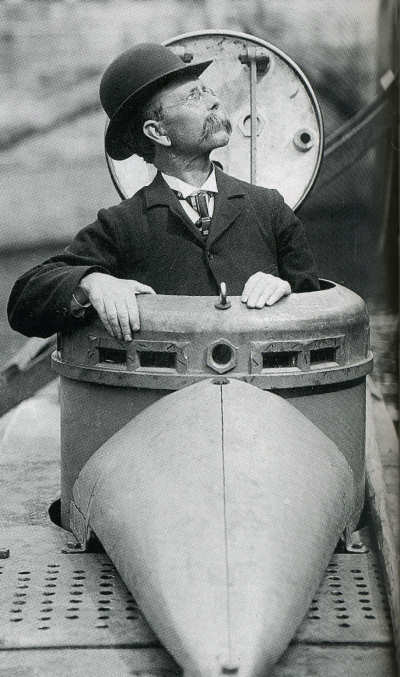
Holland stands in the hatch of his submarine

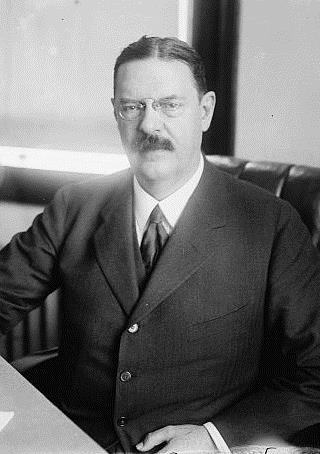
Lewis Nixon

Holland IV, also called the Zalinski Boat in 1885.

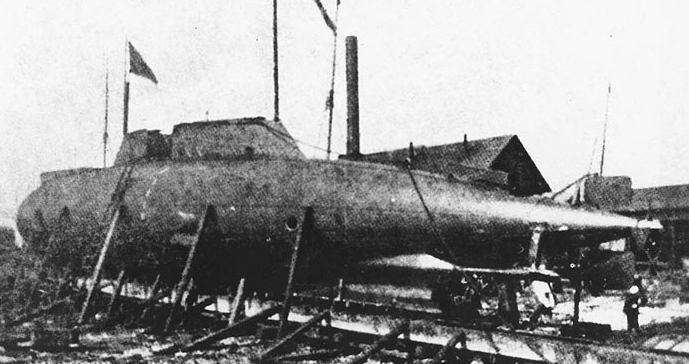
Plunger while under construction at the Columbian Iron Works, Baltimore, Maryland, an 1895 prototype

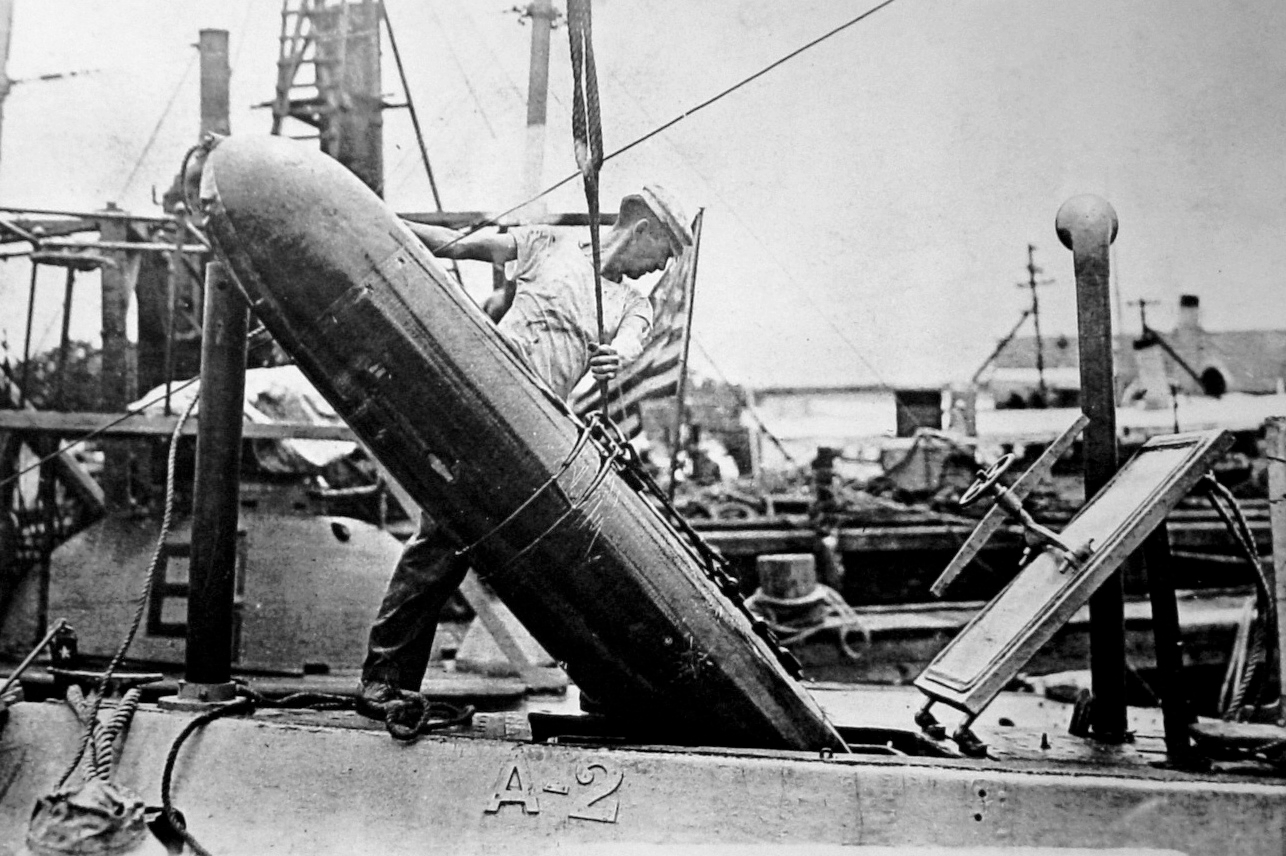
Whitehead torpedo loading into USS Adder A-2

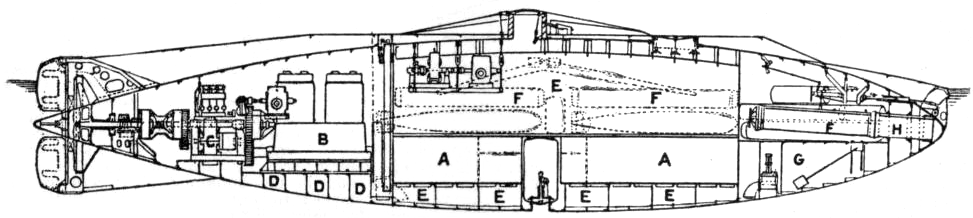
USS Adder

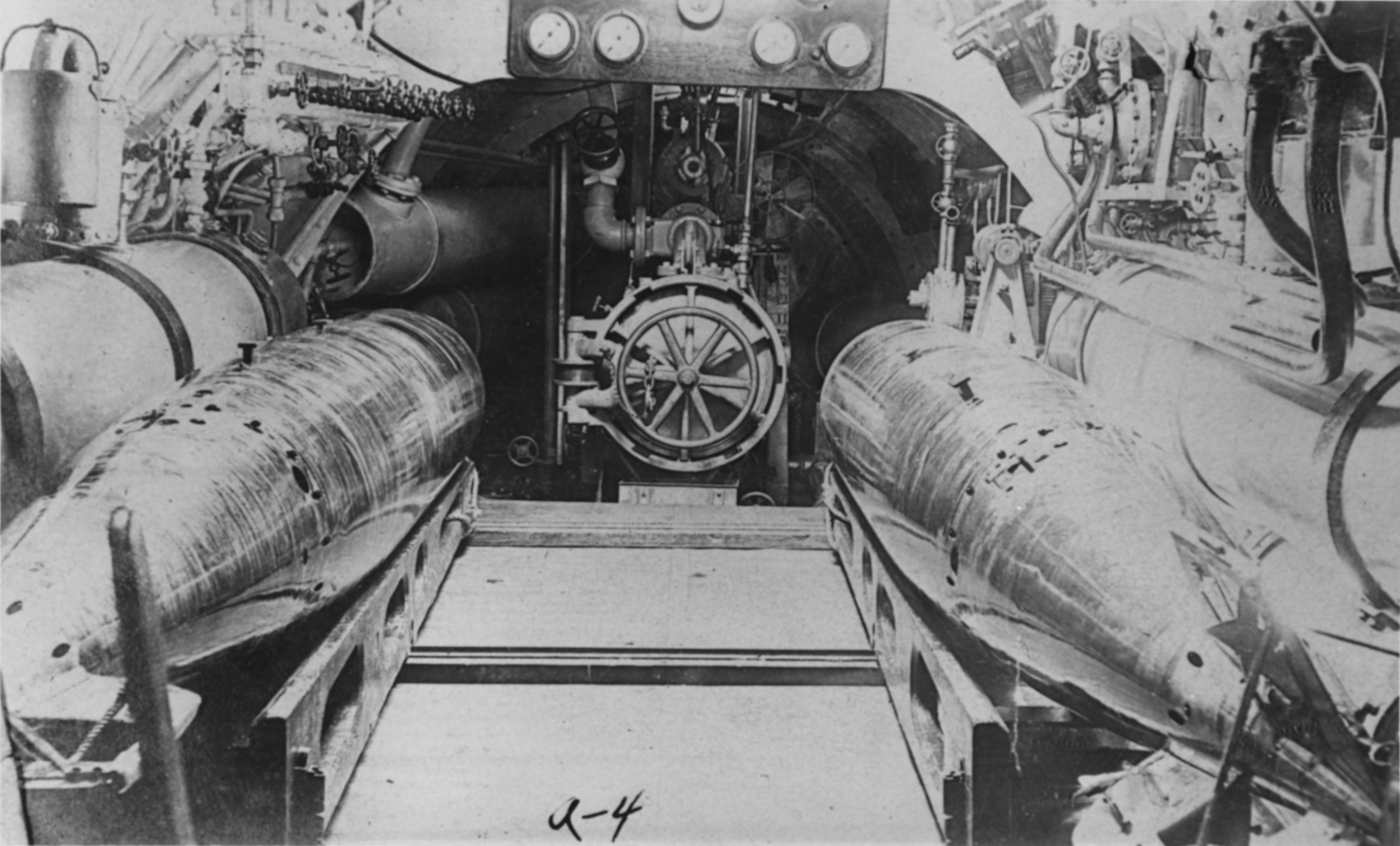
USS Moccasin A-4 torpedo room

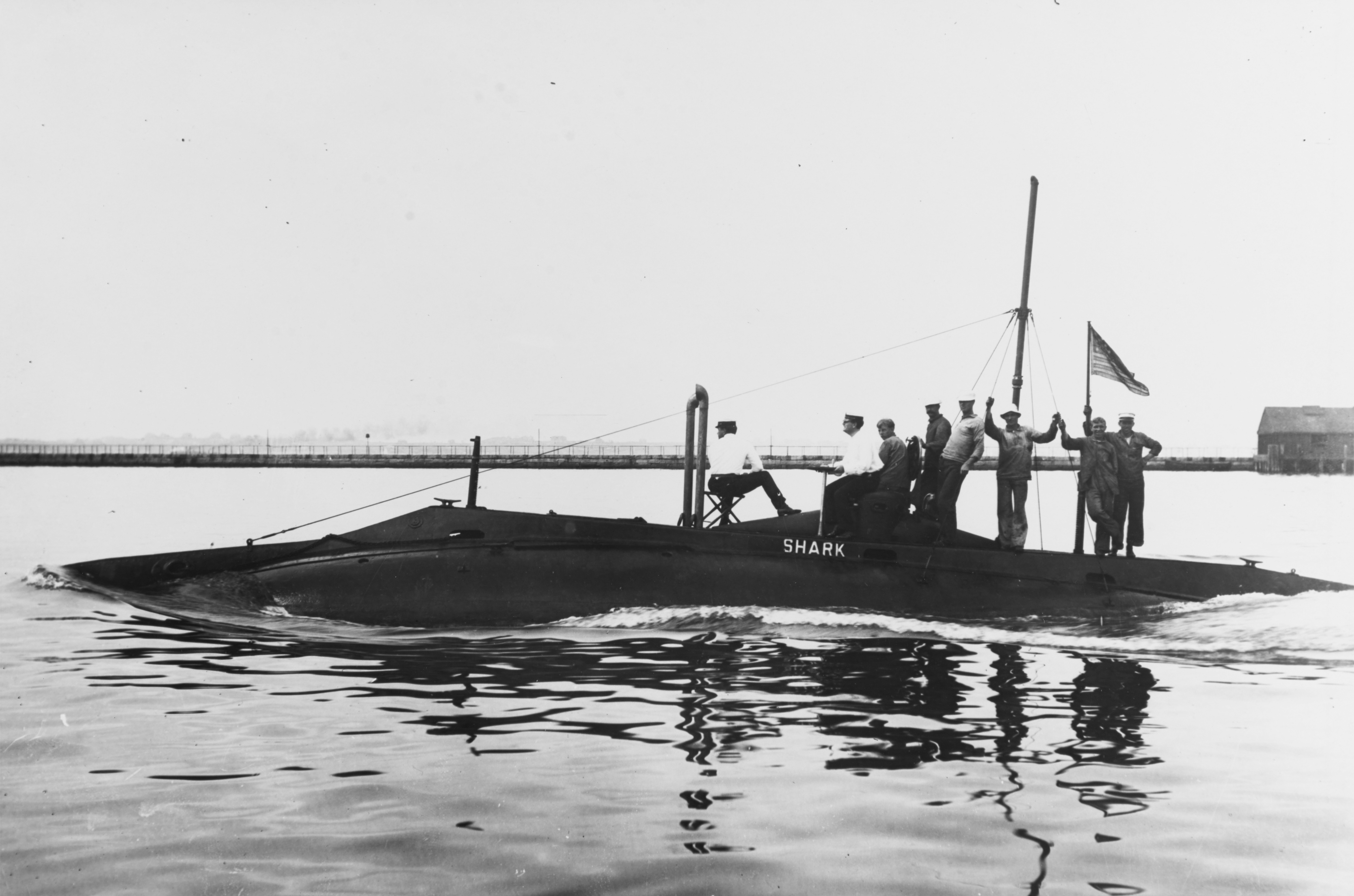
USS Shark A-7

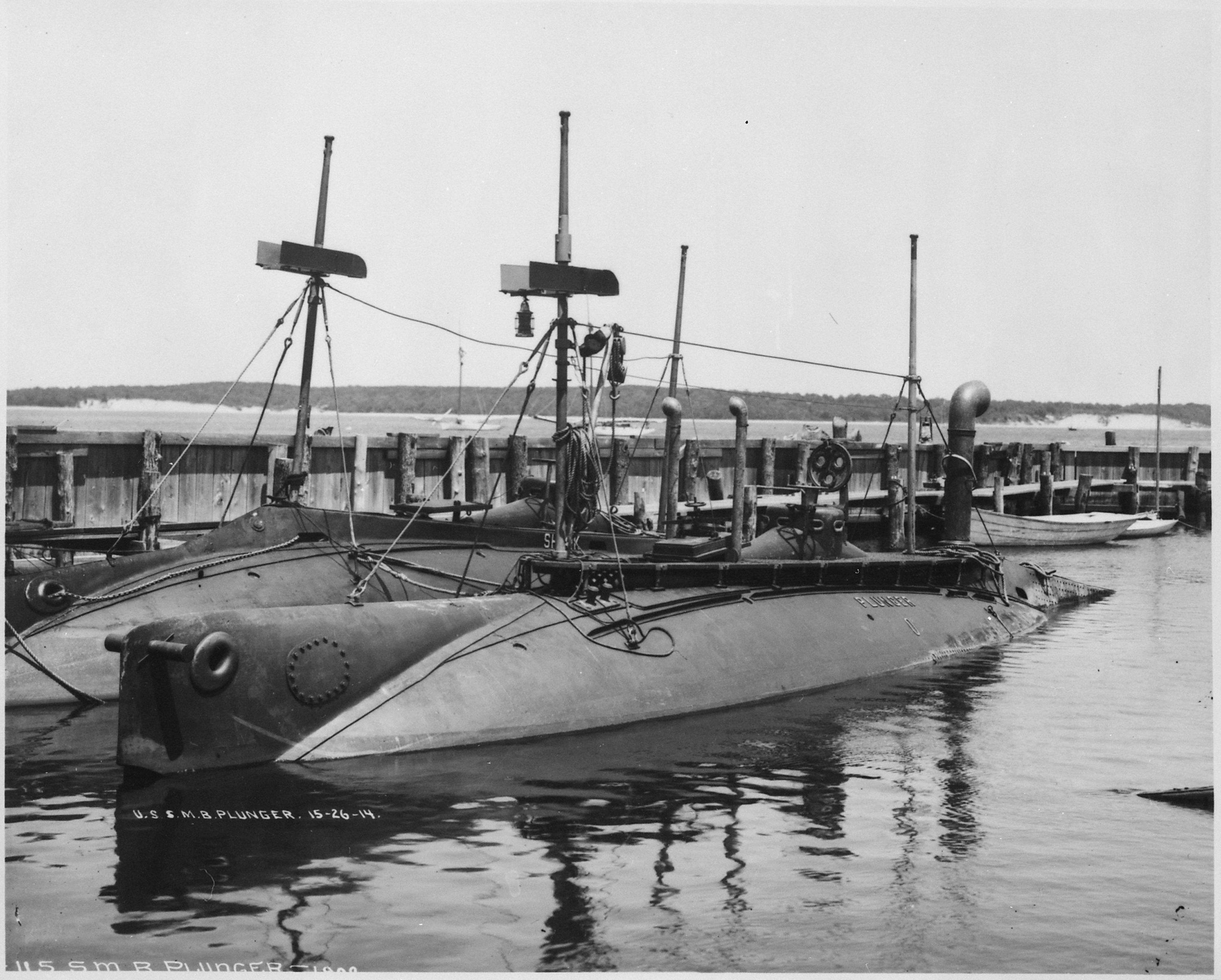
USS Plunger moored beside the USS Shark in 1902

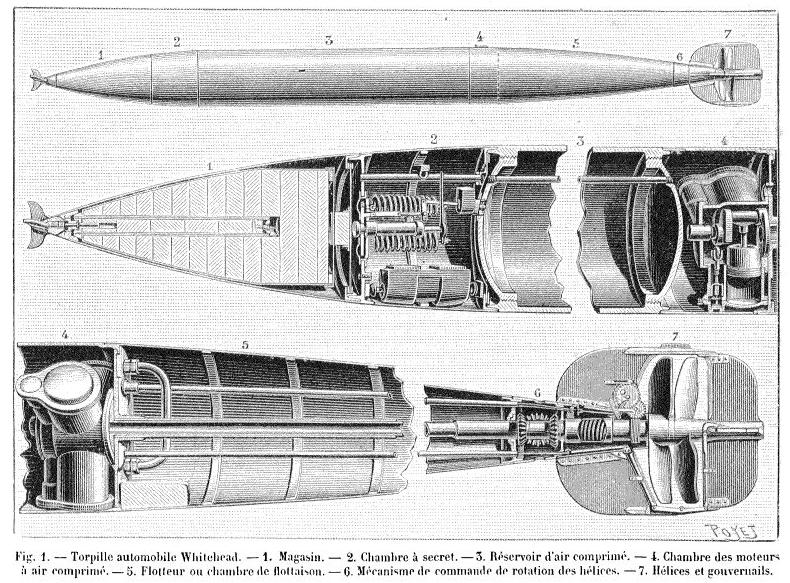
Whitehead torpedo

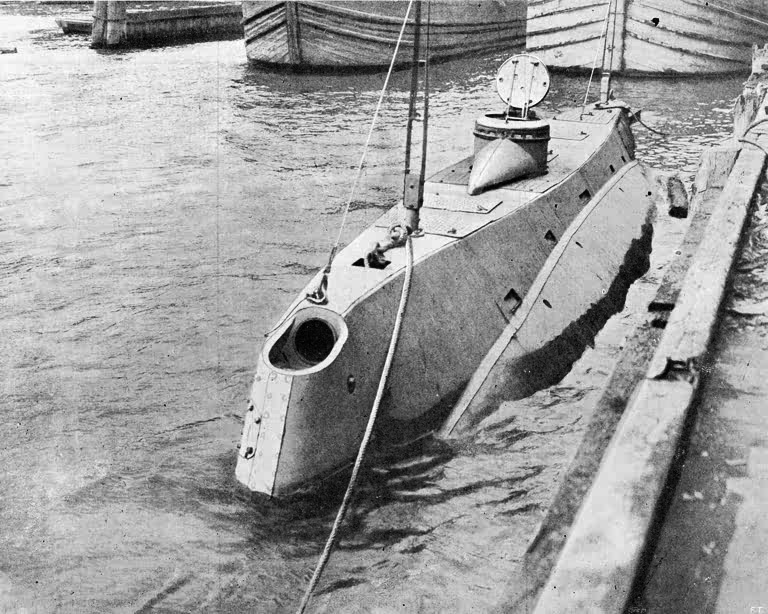
USS Holland (SS-1) in 1898. The muzzle door of the bow dynamite gun is open. Docked in New York City.
