= Russian submarine AG-22 =

Imperial Russian Navy's AG-class submarine

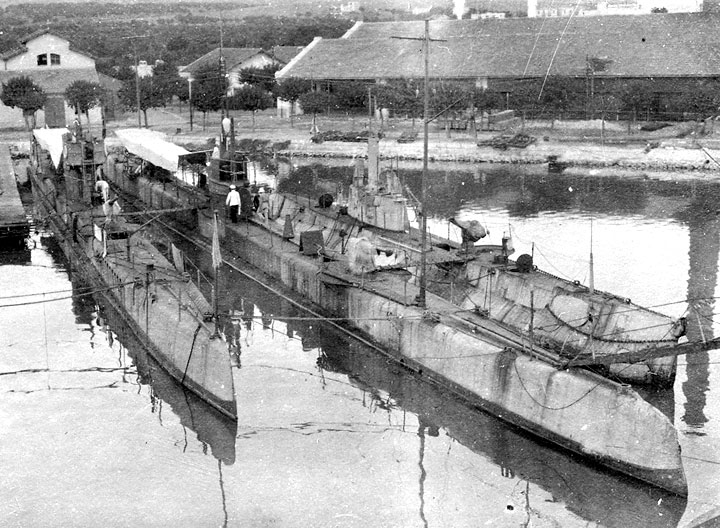
- AG-22 (on the right) in Bizerte in 1922

History

Russian Empire
- Name: AG-22
- Builder: Russud Shipyard, Nikolaev
- Laid down: 1917
- Launched: 1919
- Completed: 1919
- Fate: Abandoned, November 1923, and subsequently scrapped

General characteristics
- Class & type: AG-class submarine
- Displacement: 355 long tons (361 t) surfaced; 433 long tons (440 t) submerged
- Length: 150 ft 3 in (45.8 m)
- Beam: 16 ft (4.9 m)
- Draft: 12 ft 6 in (3.8 m)
- Installed power: 2 × diesel engines (480 bhp (360 kW)); 2 × electric motors (640 hp (480 kW))
- Propulsion: 2 × propeller shafts; Diesel-electric
- Speed: 13 knots (24 km/h; 15 mph) (surfaced); 10.5 knots (19.4 km/h; 12.1 mph) (submerged)
- Range: 1,750 nmi (3,240 km; 2,010 mi) at 7 knots (13 km/h; 8.1 mph) (surfaced); 25 nmi (46 km; 29 mi) at 3 knots (5.6 km/h; 3.5 mph) (submerged)
- Test depth: 164 feet (50 m)
- Complement: 30
- Armament: 4 × bow 18-inch (457 mm) torpedo tubes; (8 torpedoes); 1 × 47-millimeter (1.9 in) gun

The Russian submarine AG-22 was an AG-class submarine, designed by the American Holland Torpedo Boat Company/Electric Boat Company, built for the Imperial Russian Navy during World War I. The submarine was fabricated in Canada, shipped to Russia and reassembled for service with the Black Sea Fleet. Her reassembly was completed in 1919 by the White Movement during the Russian Civil War, and she joined Wrangel's fleet as it evacuated the Crimea in 1920 and was interned in Bizerte, Tunisia in 1921. AG-22 was abandoned there and subsequently scrapped.

== Description ==
AG-22 was a single-hulled submarine, with a pressure hull divided into five watertight compartments. The submarine had a length of 150 feet 3 inches (45.8 m) overall, a beam of 16 feet (4.9 m) and a draft of 12 feet 6 inches (3.8 m). She displaced 355 long tons (361 t) on the surface and 433 long tons (440 t) submerged. The AG-class submarines had a diving depth of 164 feet (50.0 m) and a crew of 30 officers and enlisted men.

The submarine had two three-bladed propellers, each of which was driven by a 480-horsepower (360 kW) diesel engine as well as a 640-horsepower (477 kW) electric motors. This arrangement gave AG-22 a maximum speed of 13 knots (24 km/h; 15 mph) while surfaced and 10.5 knots (19.4 km/h; 12.1 mph) submerged. She had a range of 1,750 nmi (3,240 km; 2,010 mi) at 7 knots (13 km/h; 8.1 mph) while on the surface and 25 nmi (46 km; 29 mi) at 3 knots (5.6 km/h; 3.5 mph) while submerged. Her fuel capacity was 16.5 long tons (16.8 t) of fuel oil.

The AG-class submarines were equipped with four 18-inch (457 mm) torpedo tubes in the bow and carried eight torpedoes. For surface combat they had one 47-millimeter (1.9 in) deck gun.

== Construction and service ==
The Holland 602 design was widely exported during World War I and the Imperial Russian Navy ordered a total of 17, in three batches, of a version known as the American Holland-class (AG in Russian for Amerikansky Golland (American Holland)). The submarines were to be built in Canada as knock-down kits for assembly in Russia.

Steel for the first three submarines (AG-21, AG-22, and AG-23) of the second batch ordered by the Russians was assembled in Saint John, New Brunswick by May 1916. Five months later, they were sent to Vancouver by rail in sections where they were loaded into ships and shipped to Vladivostok. There they were loaded onto the Trans-Siberian Railroad and transported to Nikolaev where they were assembled by the Russud Shipyard. Assembly was delayed by the unrest caused by the Russian Revolution and the subsequent Russian Civil War and was not completed until 1919. By this time, Nikolaev was controlled by the Whites and they took AG-22 with them when they evacuated the Crimea in late 1920 as part of what came to be called Wrangel's Fleet. They ultimately were granted asylum in Bizerte in February 1921. AG-22 was abandoned there in November 1923 and subsequently scrapped.

== Bibliography ==
- Polmar, Norman & Noot, Jurrien (1991). Submarines of the Russian and Soviet Navies, 1718–1990. Naval Institute Press. ISBN 0-87021-570-1.
- Watts, Anthony J. (1990). The Imperial Russian Navy. Arms and Armour. ISBN 0-85368-912-1.
