= Holland Torpedo Boat Station =

First United States Navy submarine station

- New Suffolk, New York

- Location within New York
- Coordinates: 40.991650°N 72.470833°W
- Founded: 1899 (closed 1905)
- Founder: John Philip Holland
- Time zone: UTC-5 (Eastern (EST))
  - Summer (DST): UTC-4 (EDT)
- Website: https://www.gdeb.com/

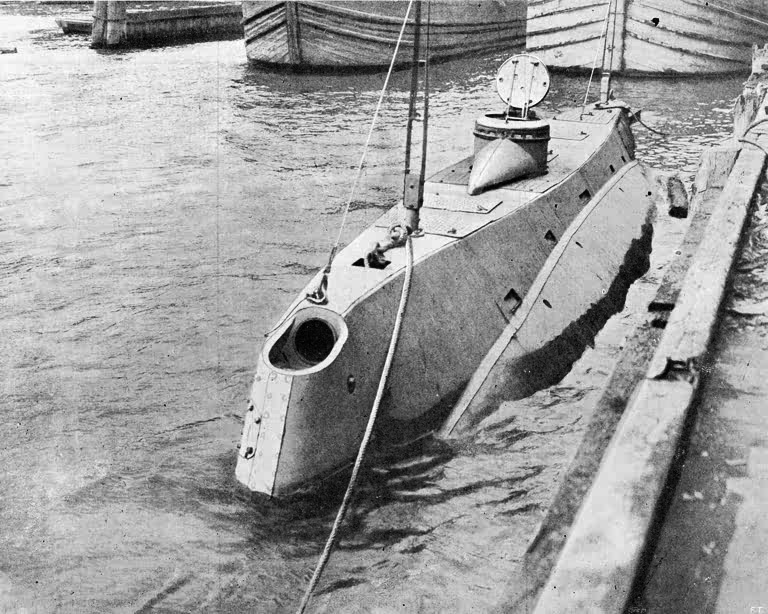
USS Holland at the Holland Torpedo Boat Station in 1898. The muzzle door of the bow dynamite gun is open.

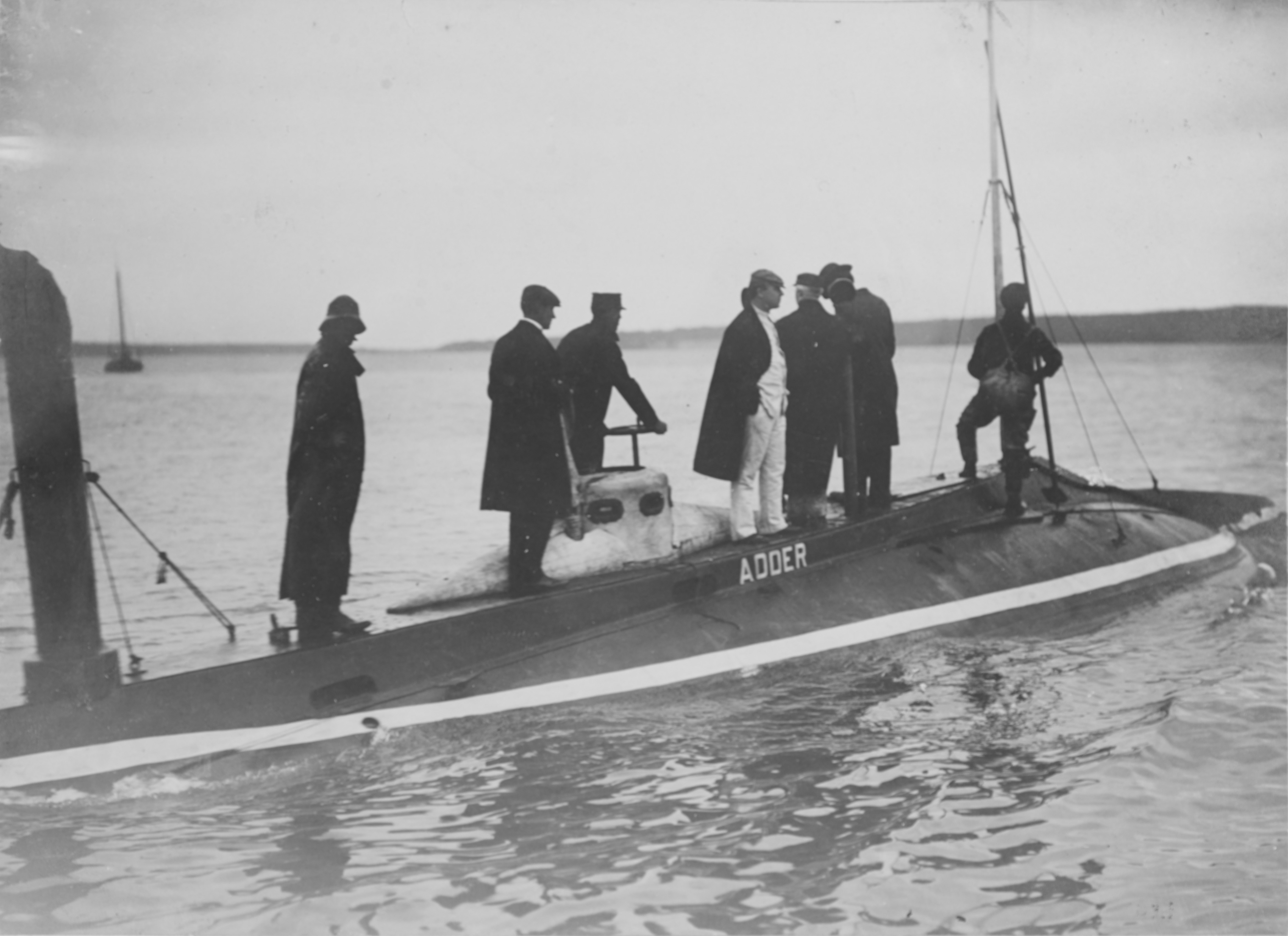
USS Adder use test at Holland Torpedo Boat Station

Holland Torpedo Boat Station is where the first United States Navy submarines were stationed for trials and training of submarine crews from 1899 to 1905. Holland Torpedo Boat Station was located in the hamlet of New Suffolk, New York. New Suffolk claims to be the first submarine base in the United States. The USS Holland was based at New Suffolk's Holland Torpedo Boat Station from 1899 to 1905. Seven submarines built by the Holland Torpedo Boat Company – Electric Boat Company were stationed at New Suffolk. Holland Torpedo Boat Station on Cutchogue Harbor was not designated a submarine base by the US Navy. The US Navy gave that title to Naval Submarine Base New London as the first submarine base. Naval Submarine Base New London was commissioned by the US Navy in 1916 as a dedicated submarine base.

== History ==
The USS Holland, the US Navy's first submarine, was launched in May 1897 and tested at Holland Torpedo Boat Station. Built by Crescent Shipyard at Elizabeth, New Jersey, the 55 feet long by 11 feet wide Holland made its first sea trials at Perth Amboy, New Jersey on 17 March 1898 before moving to Holland Torpedo Boat Station. The Holland was acquired by the Navy on 11 April 1900 and commissioned on 12 October 1900 at Newport, Rhode Island.

On 16 October 1900, the USS Holland departed for her first port, the United States Naval Academy at Annapolis, Maryland, for crew training. The submarine had a crew of one officer and five enlisted men.

Holland Torpedo Boat Station had engineers, mechanics, draftsmen, machine shops, housing, and all the supplies needed to operate the seven submarines at the station. A two-mile-long test track was made about three miles east of Holland Torpedo Boat Station in Little Peconic Bay. Little Peconic Bay is at the north end of Long Island located at 41.0074560°N 72.410280°W. The two-mile test track was marked with buoys and flags.

To test the submarine and train the crew, the submarine ran the course in both directions. On 26 July 1899 the USS Plunger followed the course submerged. A Whitehead torpedo was added to the submarine Holland at the Station on 20 August 1899 for training. On 6 November 1899, the first sea trails of the Holland were made. Rear Admiral Frederick Rodgers and other US Navy personnel were at the first sea trails, for which Holland had seven crew members and two US Navy officers: Commander William H. Emory and Captain John Lowe (1838–1930) as observers for the Navy. In addition to the observers, three Whitehead torpedoes were aboard. The test did electric runs (125V-175A), gas-powered runs, submerged runs, torpedo firings and torpedo reloading (Holland had one torpedo tube). Buoy with flags was added to the Holland so Frederick Rodgers and others could track the Holland during the submerged runs. The US Navy sea trial was successful and a report was given to the US Navy and US Congress.

On 7 November 1899, Captain John Lowe would report to the US Congress the need for a fleet of submarines, as Philippines, Hawaii and other United States oversea territories could be attacked. Captain John Lowe became the first naval officer to be posted on active duty in the new US Navy submarine service. John Lowe retired in 1900, and in 1911 was promoted to rear admiral with a retroactive promotion back to 1900.

== Station Submarines ==
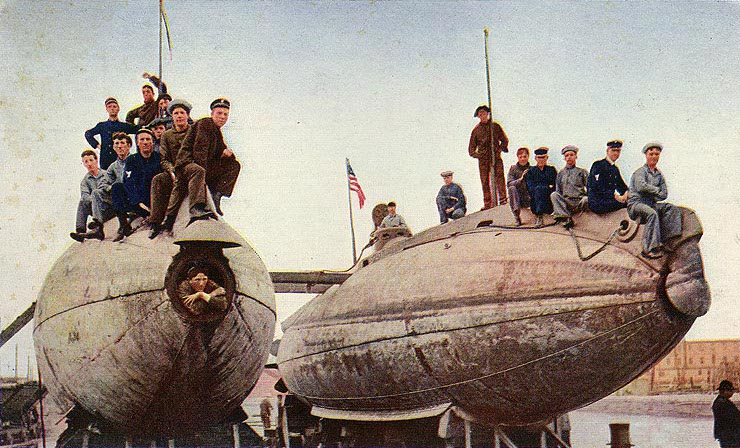
The USS Porpoise (SS-7) and USS Shark (SS-8) in 1905

- USS Holland (SS-1), launched 1897 museum ship in 1913, scrapped 1932
- USS Plunger (1895) was an experimental steam submarine, canceled April 1900 prior to completion, scrapped 1917

The five Plunger-class submarines, launched from 1901 to 1903, that were stationed and tested at Holland Torpedo Boat Station:

- USS Plunger (SS-2) / A-1, launched 1902, scrapped 1922
- USS Adder A-2, launched 1901, sunk as target 1920
- USS Moccasin A-4, launched 1901, sunk as target 1921
- USS Porpoise A-6, launched 1901, sunk as target 1921
- USS Shark A-7, launched 1901, sunk as target 1921
  - Plunger-class submarines that were built and stationed in San Francisco, California:
  - USS Pike A-5, launched 1903, sunk as target 1921
  - USS Grampus A-3, launched 1902, sunk as target 1921

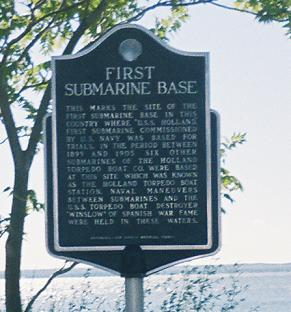
Plaque stating New Suffolk, New York's claim to be the first submarine base.

== Historical Marker ==
- First Submarine Base Historical Marker reads:

This marks the site of the first submarine base in this country where "U.S.S. Holland", first submarine commissioned by the U.S. Navy was based for trials. In the period between 1899 and 1905 six other submarines of the Holland Torpedo Boat Co. were based at this site which was known as the Holland Torpedo Boat Station. Naval maneuvers between submarines and the U.S.S. torpedo boat destroyer "Winslow" of the Spanish War fame were held in these waters.
Erected by Cutchogue-New Suffolk Historical Council.
Located at Main Street at Cutchogue Harbor in New Suffolk, New York.

== Gallery ==
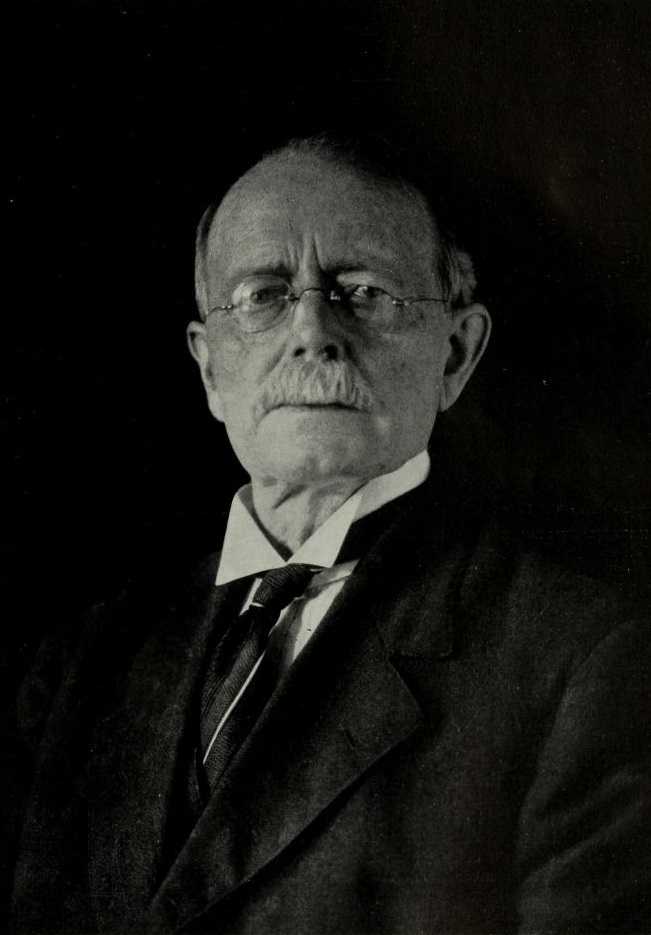
John Philip Holland founder

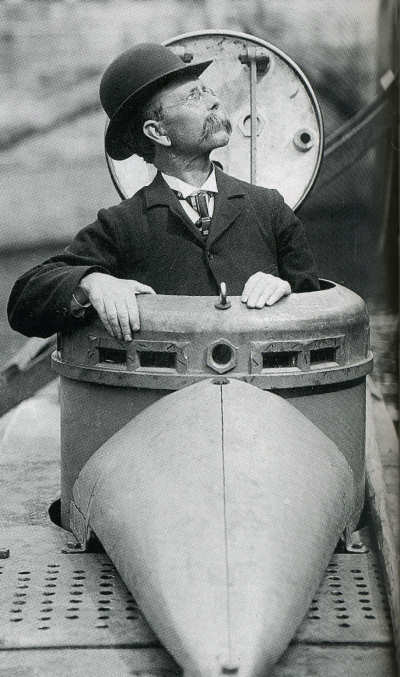
John Holland (1841–1914) stands in the hatch of a submarine

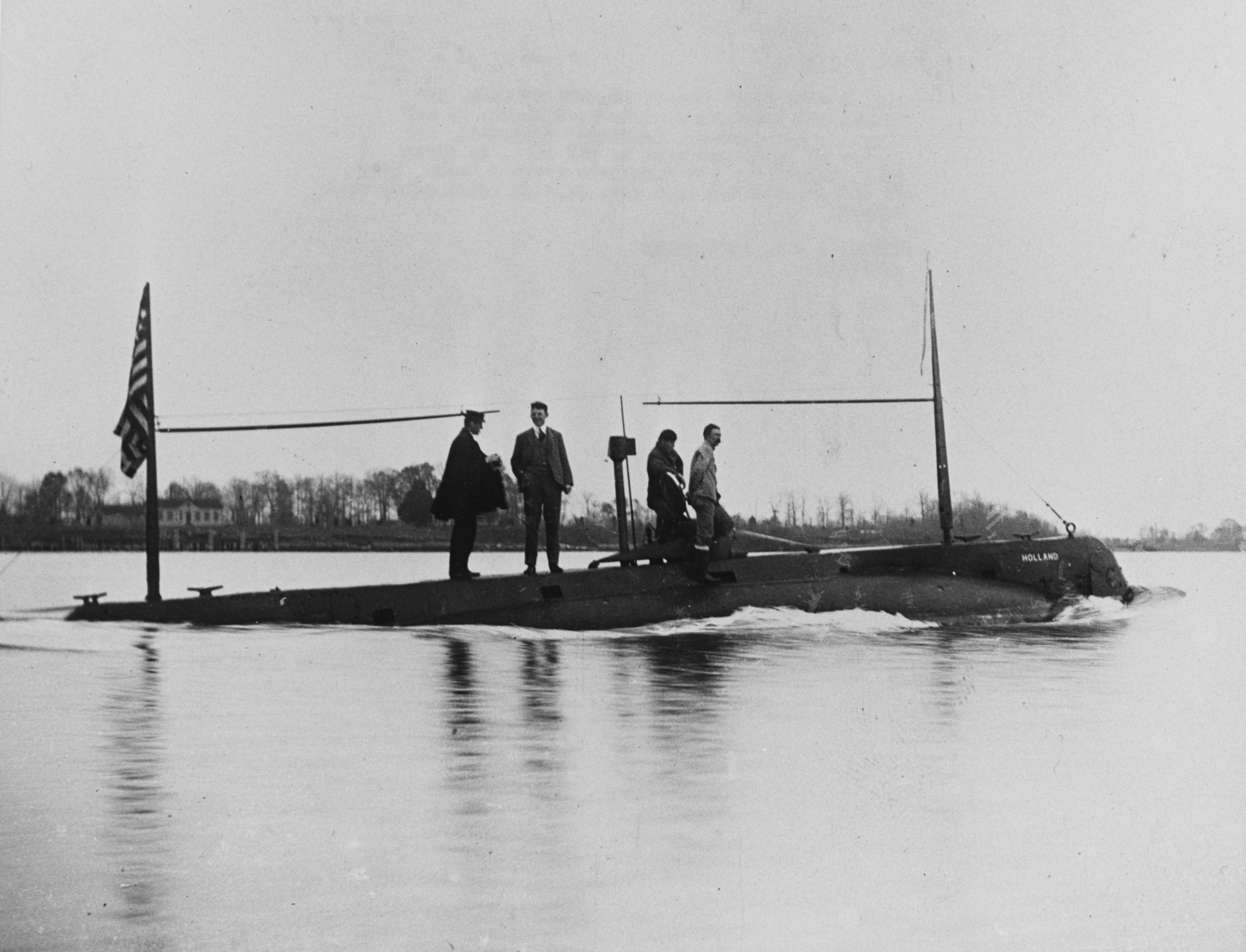
USS Holland (SS-1) underway

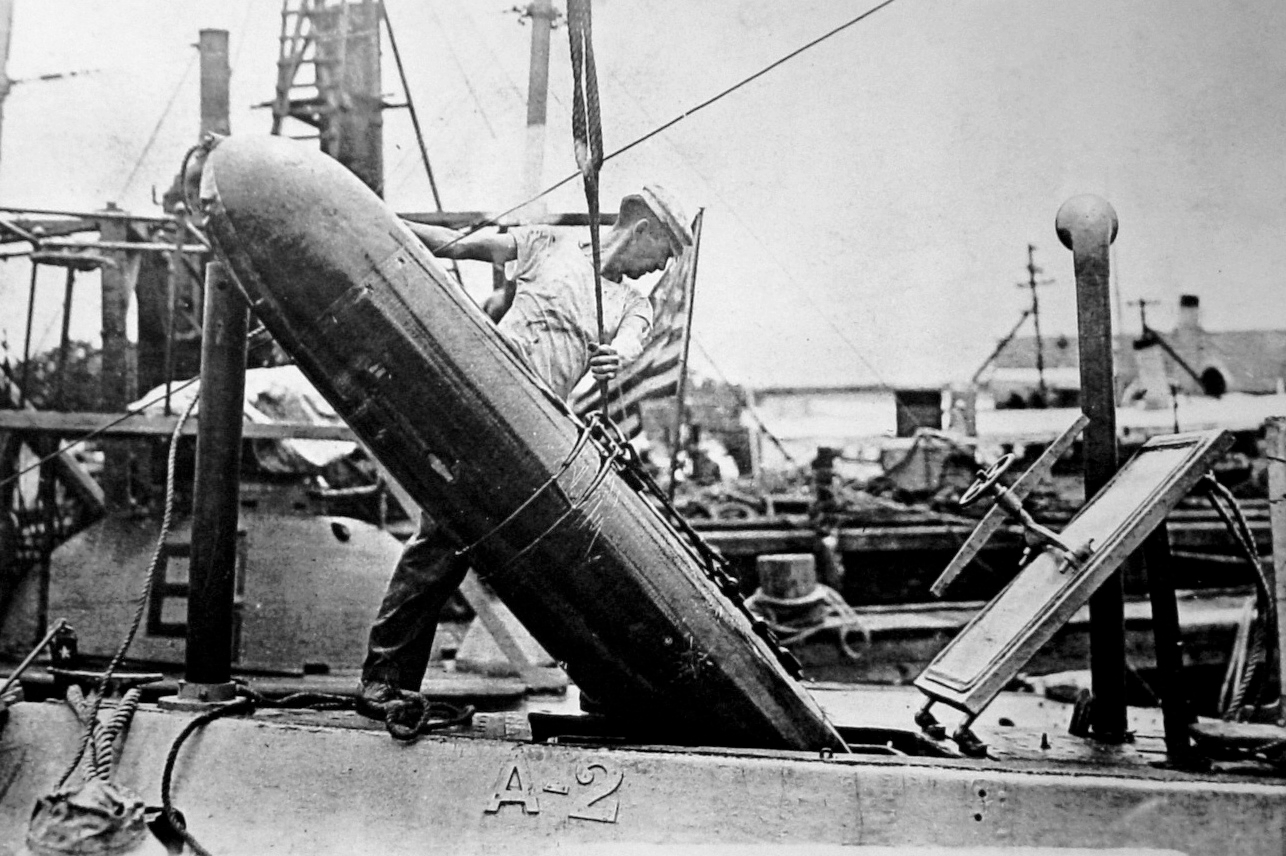
Whitehead torpedo loading into USS Adder A-2

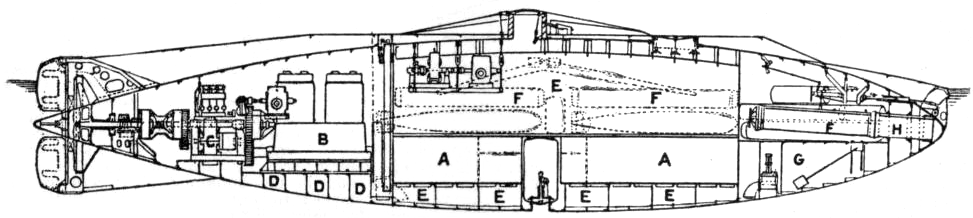
USS Adder

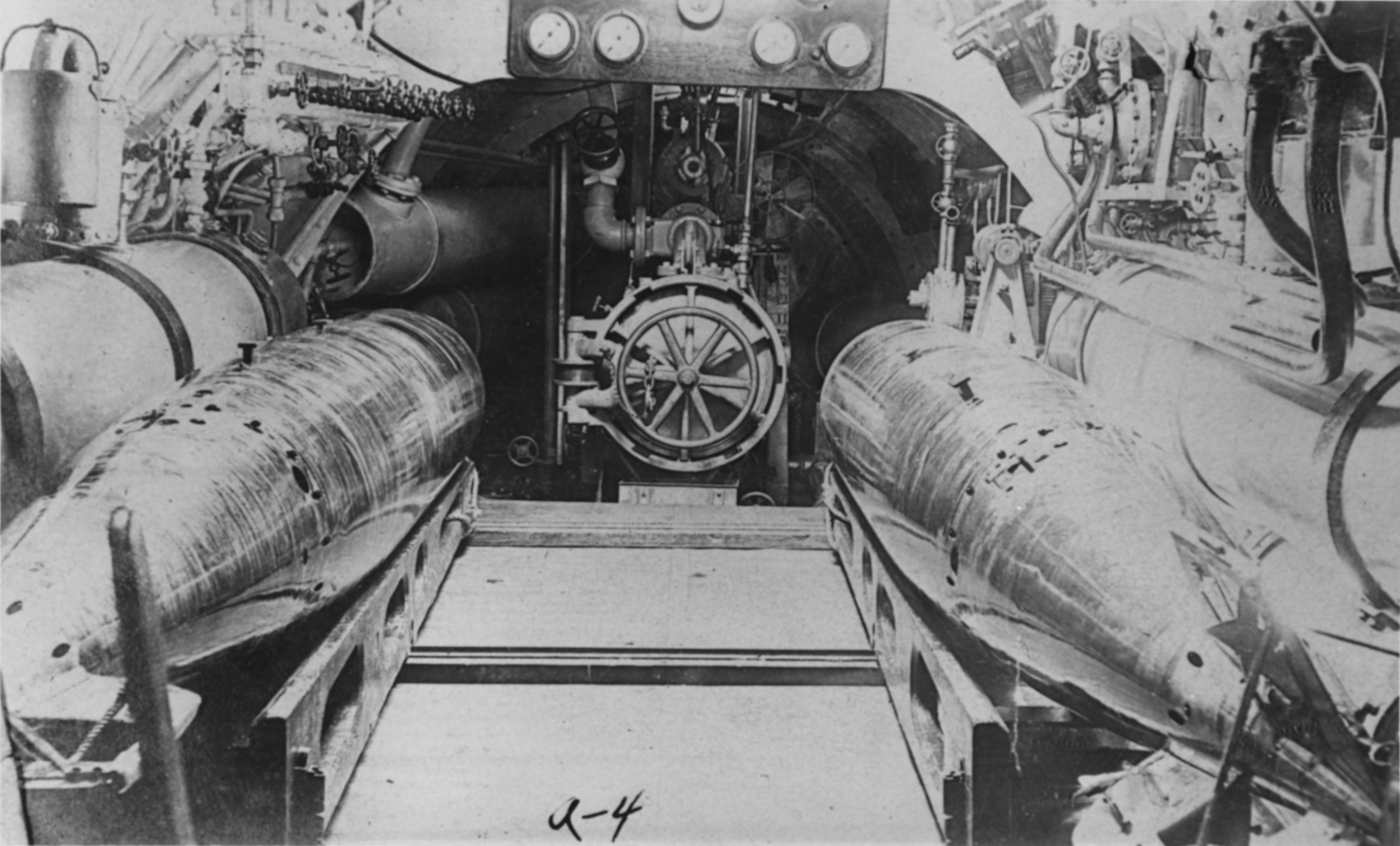
USS Moccasin A-4 torpedo room

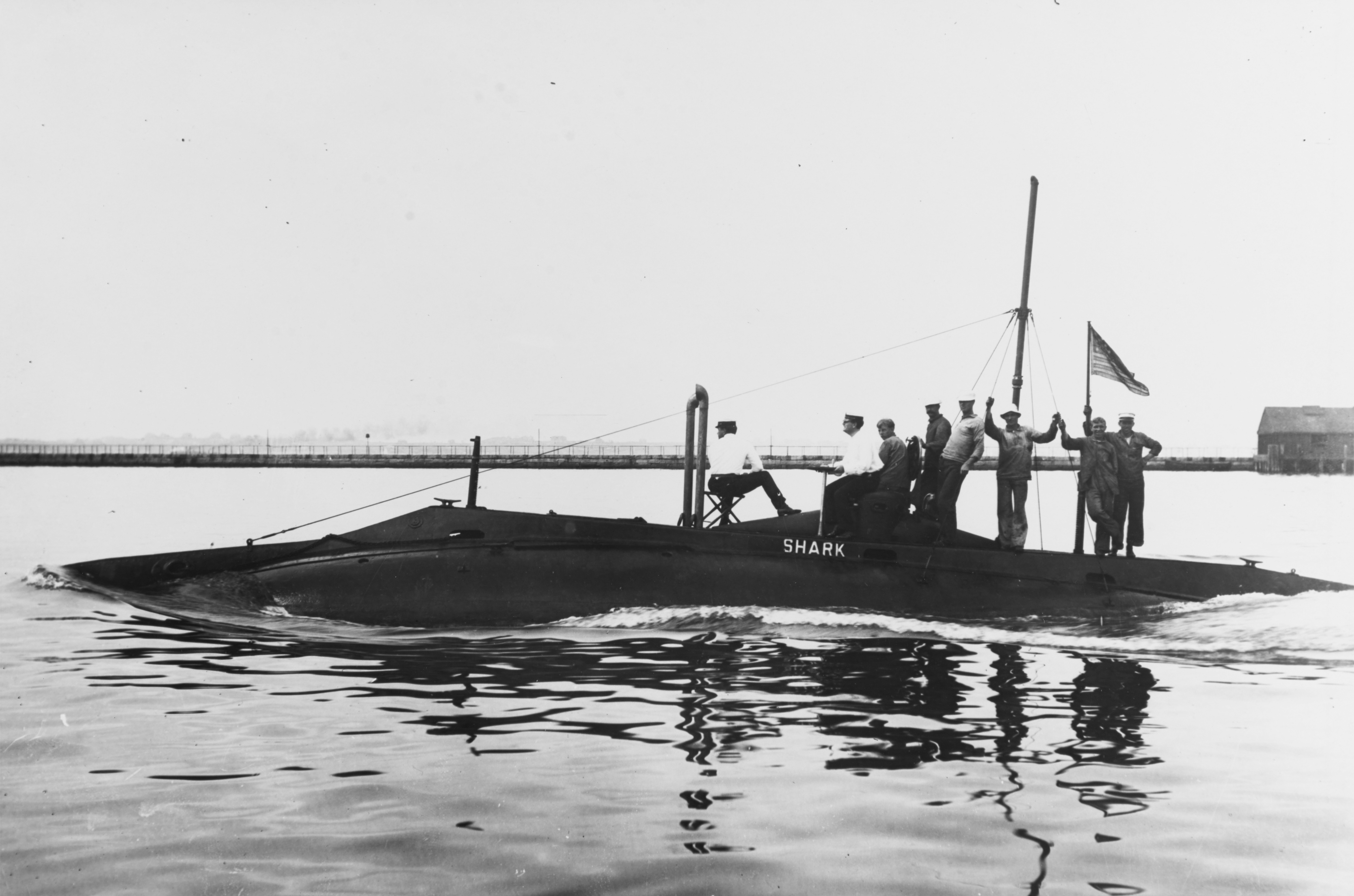
USS Shark A-7

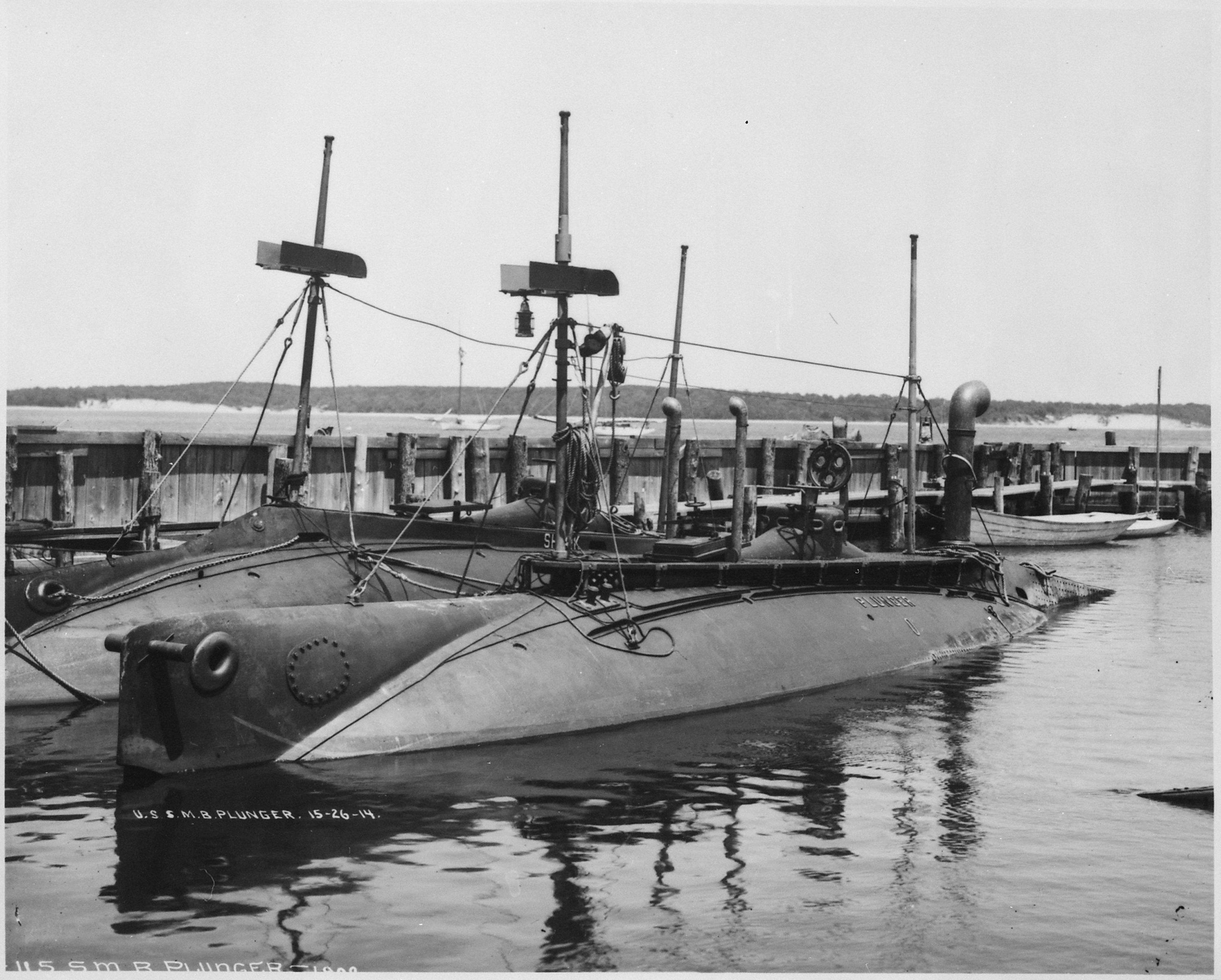
USS Plunger moored beside the USS Shark in 1902

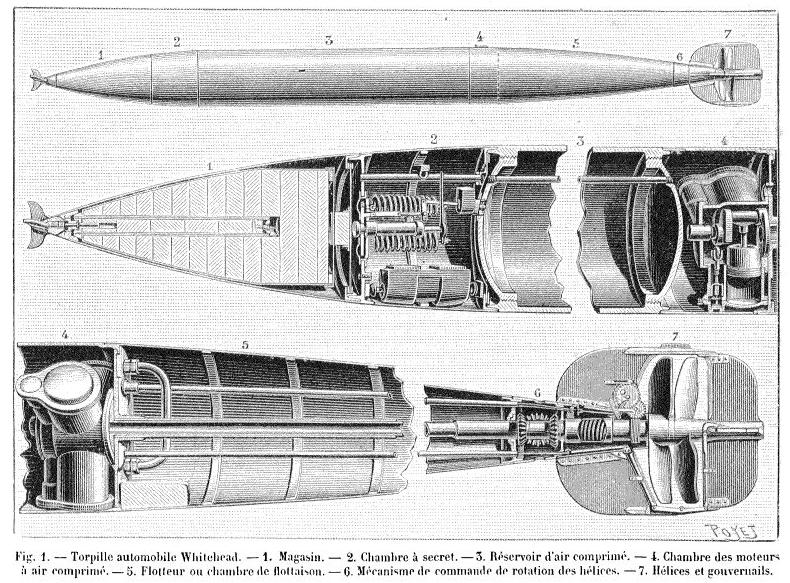
Whitehead torpedo

== See also ==
- Shore facility
- Submarine pen
- Submarines in the United States Navy
- List of submarine classes of the United States Navy
- Submarine Force Library and Museum
- Submarine squadron
- History of submarines
