= George Baker (inventor) =

American inventor and submarine pioneer

George Collin Baker
- Born: December 21, 1844
- Died: March 23, 1894 (aged 49)
- Occupation: Inventor Submarine Pioneer

George Collin Baker (December 21, 1844 - March 23, 1894) was an American inventor and submarine pioneer.

In 1888, the US government announced a competition for submarine designs. Plans were submitted by Baker, John Philip Holland, Thorsten Nordenfelt and Josiah Tuck. Holland won the competition, but due to irregularities the contract was not awarded. Baker nevertheless built his submarine prototype and it was tested in the Rouge River. A new competition was announced in 1893, resulting in rivalry between Holland and Baker, the two inventors with usable vessels. Unfortunately, Baker developed appendicitis and died in March 1894. The contract ended up awarded to the Holland Torpedo Boat Company in 1895. The collaboration between Holland and the navy ultimately led to the USS Holland (SS-1), the first modern submarine commissioned in the United States Navy.
