= USS Adder =

Plunger-class submarine of the United States

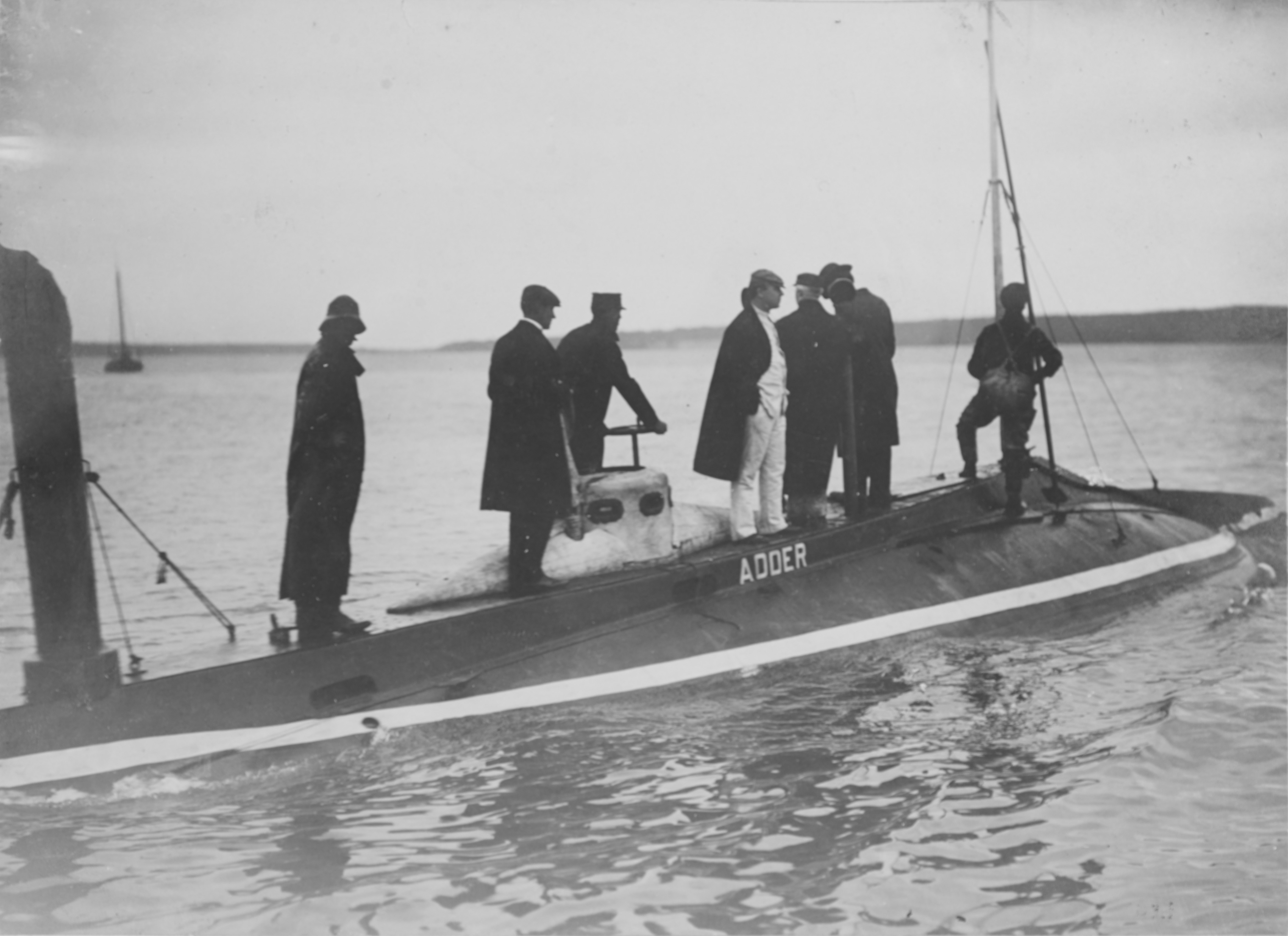
- USS Adder running trials in Long Island Sound, 1903

History

United States
- Name: Adder
- Namesake: The adder
- Ordered: 7 June 1900
- Awarded: 25 August 1900
- Builder: Crescent Shipyard, Elizabethport, New Jersey
- Laid down: 3 October 1900
- Launched: 22 July 1901
- Sponsored by: Mrs. Jane S. Wainwright
- Commissioned: 12 January 1903
- Decommissioned: 26 July 1909
- Recommissioned: 10 February 1910
- Decommissioned: 12 December 1919
- Renamed: A-2 (Submarine Torpedo Boat No. 3), 17 November 1911
- Stricken: 16 January 1922
- Identification: Hull symbol: SS-3 (17 July 1920); Call sign: NBF
- Fate: Designated for use as a target, 24 September 1920 and expended mid-January 1922

General characteristics
- Class & type: Plunger-class submarine
- Displacement: 107 long tons (109 t) surfaced; 123 long tons (125 t) submerged
- Length: 63 ft 10 in (19.46 m)
- Beam: 11 ft 11 in (3.63 m)
- Draft: 10 ft 7 in (3.23 m)
- Installed power: 160 bhp (120 kW) surfaced; 150 bhp (110 kW) submerged
- Propulsion: 1 × Otto Gas Engine Works gas engine; 1 × Electro Dynamic electric motor; 60-cell battery; 1 × shaft
- Speed: 8 kn (15 km/h; 9.2 mph) surfaced; 7 kn (13 km/h; 8.1 mph) submerged
- Test depth: 150 ft (45.7 m)
- Complement: 1 officer; 6 enlisted
- Armament: 1 × 17.7 in (450 mm) "18-in" torpedo tube (5 torpedoes)
- Armor: Conning tower: 3 5/8 in (92 mm)

USS Adder/A-2 (SS-3), also known as "Submarine Torpedo Boat No. 3", was one of seven Plunger-class submarines built for the United States Navy (USN) in the first decade of the 20th century. She was named for the adder snake. Used primarily for training, she served as harbor defense in Manila Bay, during WWI.

== Design ==
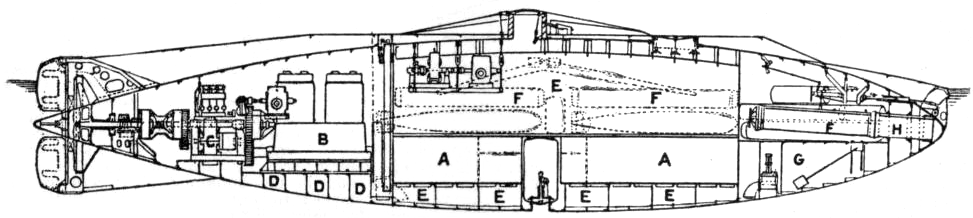
Plan of Plunger-class. A, storage batteries; B, gas-engine; C, dynamo and motor; D, water-tight compartments; E, main ballast tanks; F, air-flasks; G, gasolene tank; H, expulsion tube.

The Plunger-class submarines were enlarged and improved versions of the preceding Holland, the first submarine in the USN. They had a length of 63 ft 10 in (19.5 m) overall, a beam of 11 ft 11 in (3.6 m) and a mean draft of 10 ft 7 in (3.2 m). They displaced 107 long tons (109 t) on the surface and 123 long tons (125 t) submerged. The Plunger-class boats had a crew of one officer and six enlisted men. They had a diving depth of 150 feet (45.7 m).

For surface running, they were powered by one 180-brake-horsepower (134 kW) gasoline engine that drove the single propeller. When submerged the propeller was driven by a 70-horsepower (52 kW) electric motor. The boats could reach 8 kn (15 km/h; 9.2 mph) on the surface and 7 kn (13 km/h; 8.1 mph) underwater.

The Plunger-class boats were armed with one 18-inch (457 mm) torpedo tube in the bow. They carried four reloads, for a total of five torpedoes.

== Construction ==
Adder was laid down on 3 October 1900, at the Crescent Shipyard, in Elizabethport, New Jersey, by Lewis Nixon, a subcontractor for the Holland Torpedo Boat Company, New York City; launched on 22 July 1901; sponsored by Mrs. Jane S. Wainwright, wife of Rear Admiral Richard Wainwright. Adder was commissioned on 12 January 1903, at the Holland Torpedo Boat Station, at New Suffolk, New York. Due to her being laid down and commissioned first, the boats of the Plunger-class is often referred to as the Adler-class by historians, she was the second submarine commissioned in the United States Navy after Holland.

== Service history ==
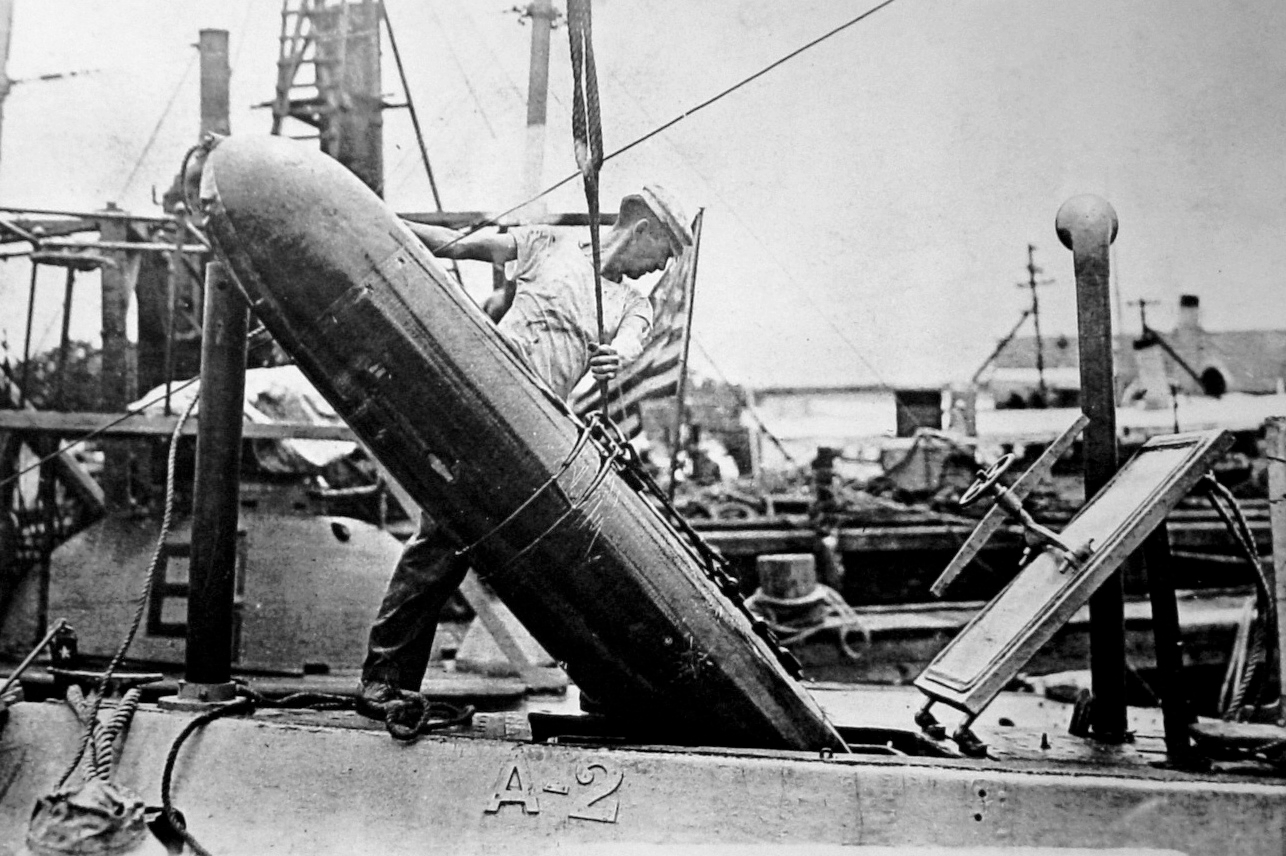
A crewman guiding one of the submarine's three torpedoes below deck through the torpedo loading hatch.

After initial experimental duty at the Naval Torpedo Station at Newport, Adder was towed to the Norfolk Naval Shipyard by the tug Peoria, arriving there on 4 December 1903. In January 1904, the submarine torpedo boat was assigned to the Reserve Torpedo Flotilla. Placed out of commission on 26 July 1909, Adder was loaded onto the collier Caesar, and was transported to the Philippines, arriving on 1 October 1909.

Recommissioned on 10 February 1910, she was assigned to duty with the 1st Submarine Division, Asiatic Torpedo Fleet. Over almost a decade, the submarine torpedo boat operated from Cavite and Olongapo, principally in training and experimental work. During this time, she was renamed on 17 November 1911, becoming simply A-2 (Submarine Torpedo Boat No. 3).

During World War I, she carried out patrols off the entrance to Manila Bay, and around the island of Corregidor.

== Fate ==
She was decommissioned on 12 December 1919. A-2, was assigned the alphanumeric hull number SS-3 on 17 July 1920, and designated for use as a target on 24 September 1920. Sunk as a target in mid-January 1922, she was struck from the Naval Vessel Register on 16 January 1922.

== Bibliography ==
- Mohl, Michael. "Adder / A-2 (SS-3)". Navsource.net.
- Cressman, Robert J. (21 June 2022). "A-2 (Submarine Torpedo Boat No. 3)". Dictionary of American Naval Fighting Ships. Navy Department, Naval History and Heritage Command. This article incorporates text from this source, which is in the public domain.
- Friedman, Norman (1995). U.S. Submarines Through 1945: An Illustrated Design History. Annapolis, Maryland: Naval Institute Press. ISBN 1-55750-263-3.
- Gardiner, Robert & Gray, Randal, eds. (1985). Conway's All the World's Fighting Ships 1906–1921. Annapolis, Maryland: Naval Institute Press. ISBN 0-85177-245-5.
- "Online Library of Selected Images: U.S. NAVY SHIPS: USS Adder (Submarine # 3, later SS-3), 1903-1922. Later renamed A-2". 5 July 2003.
