= Elihu B. Frost =

American lawyer (1860–1925)

Elihu Brintnal Frost (May 12, 1860 – August 22, 1925) was an American lawyer with an early involvement in the submarine industry.

== Early life and education ==
Born in the town of Peekskill, New York, Frost was the son of lawyer Calvin Frost and Mary Antoinette Oppie (Hait) Frost. He attended Peekskill Military Academy, and went on to graduate from Yale University in 1883. While at Yale, Frost was a member of the student secret society Skull and Bones. After Yale, he studied at Columbia Law School, and initially worked for the Lord Day & Lord law firm.

== Submarines ==
In 1893 the United States Congress funded a $200,000 prize for submarine construction, and Frost lent John Philip Holland the funds he needed to participate in this prize contest. Once the contest had concluded, Frost and Holland were awarded the prize money in 1895. Frost became secretary-treasurer and later president of Holland's firm, which was first named the John P. Holland Torpedo Boat Company and later the Holland Torpedo Boat Company, which would go on to build the first submarine used by the US Navy. When Isaac Rice formed the Electric Boat Company (the predecessor of General Dynamics) to build Holland's submarine designs, Frost became the company's vice-president, secretary, and chief financial officer.

Prominently reported in the newspapers of the time, Frost married and divorced twice. When he died of paresis in Beach Bluff, Massachusetts, he left his estate to a female friend (later determined to be his fiancée), cutting off his relatives.
