= Josiah Tuck =

American inventor and submarine designer

Josiah Hamilton Langdon Tuck (October 12, 1824 – October 14, 1900) was an American inventor and pioneering submarine designer.

In addition to his submarine work, Tuck was granted several other patents.

== Peacemaker ==
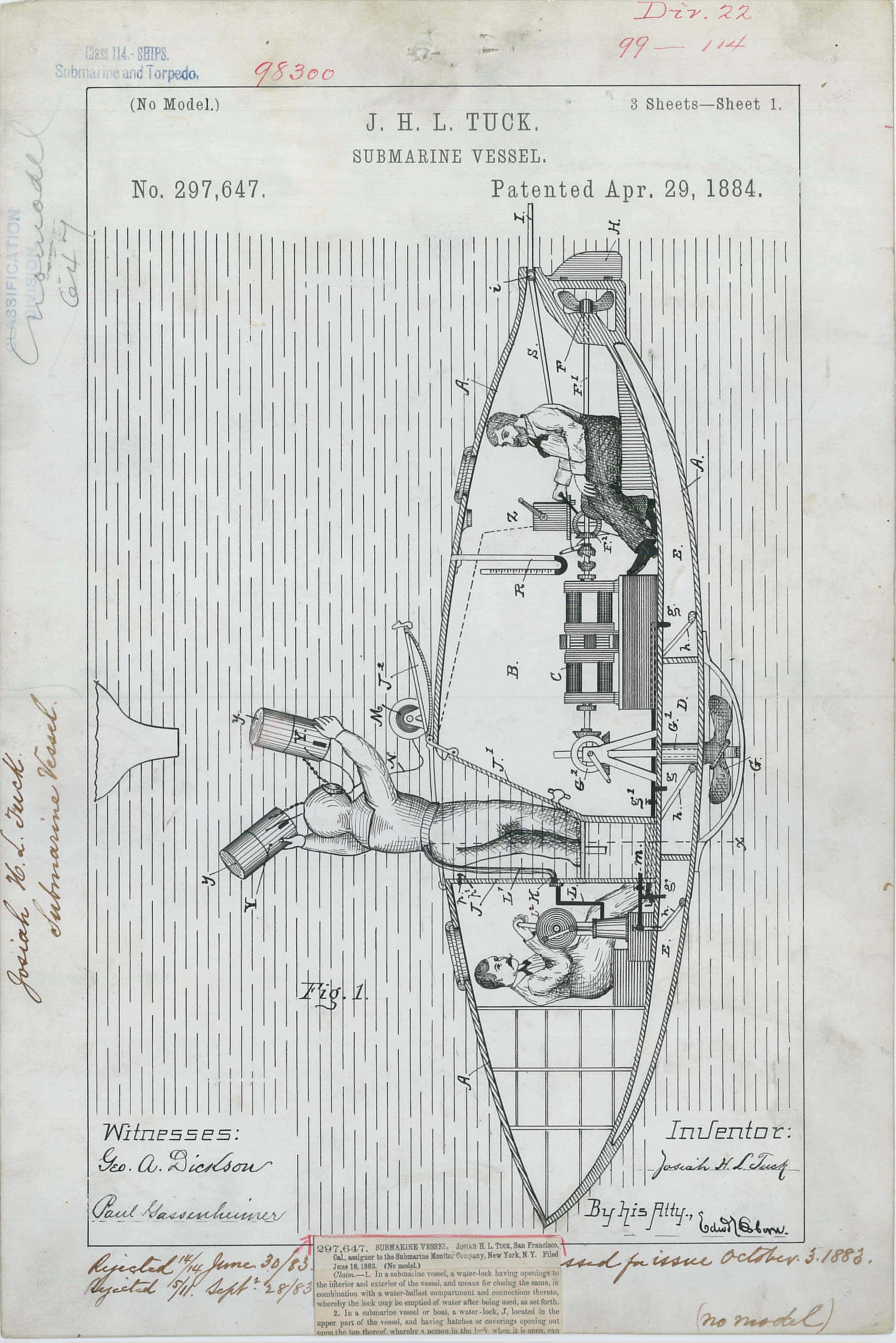

Tuck was granted U.S. patent 297,647 for a "submarine vessel" in 1884. His submarine prototype, the Peacemaker, was tested with mixed success in 1884, 1885 and 1886 in New York's harbor. In its final form, it was powered by a chemical reaction based on caustic soda and it was armed with electrically fused buoyant "torpedoes" (U.S. patent 297,648), explosive charges that were intended to be planted under enemy ships.

In 1888, the US government announced a competition for submarine designs. Tuck submitted his design along with a number of other inventors, including John Philip Holland, Thorsten Nordenfelt and George C. Baker. Holland won the competition, but due to irregularities the contract was not awarded.
