= New Suffolk, New York =

- Hamlet and census-designated place
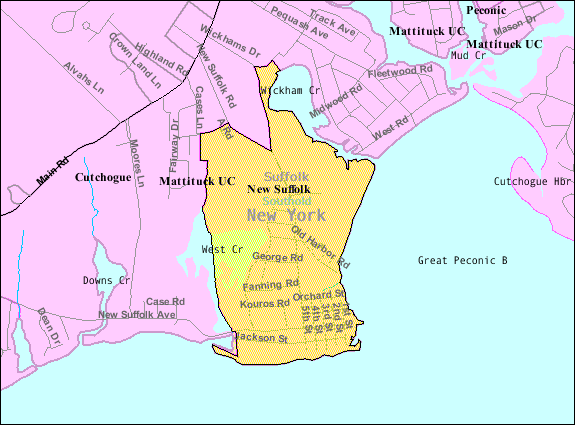

- Location within New York
- Coordinates: 40°59′34″N 72°28′31″W
- Country: United States
- State: New York
- County: Suffolk
- Town: Southold

Area
  - Total: 0.61 sq mi (1.58 km^{2})
  - Land: 0.56 sq mi (1.44 km^{2})
  - Water: 0.054 sq mi (0.14 km^{2})
- Elevation: 26 ft (8 m)

Population (2020)
  - Total: 403
  - Density: 724.3/sq mi (279.64/km^{2})
- Time zone: UTC-5 (Eastern (EST))
  - Summer (DST): UTC-4 (EDT)
- ZIP code: 11956
- Area code: 631
- FIPS code: 36-50727
- GNIS feature ID: 0958460

New Suffolk is a census-designated place (CDP) that roughly corresponds to the hamlet by the same name in the Town of Southold in Suffolk County, New York, United States. The CDP's population was 403 as of the 2020 census.

== History ==
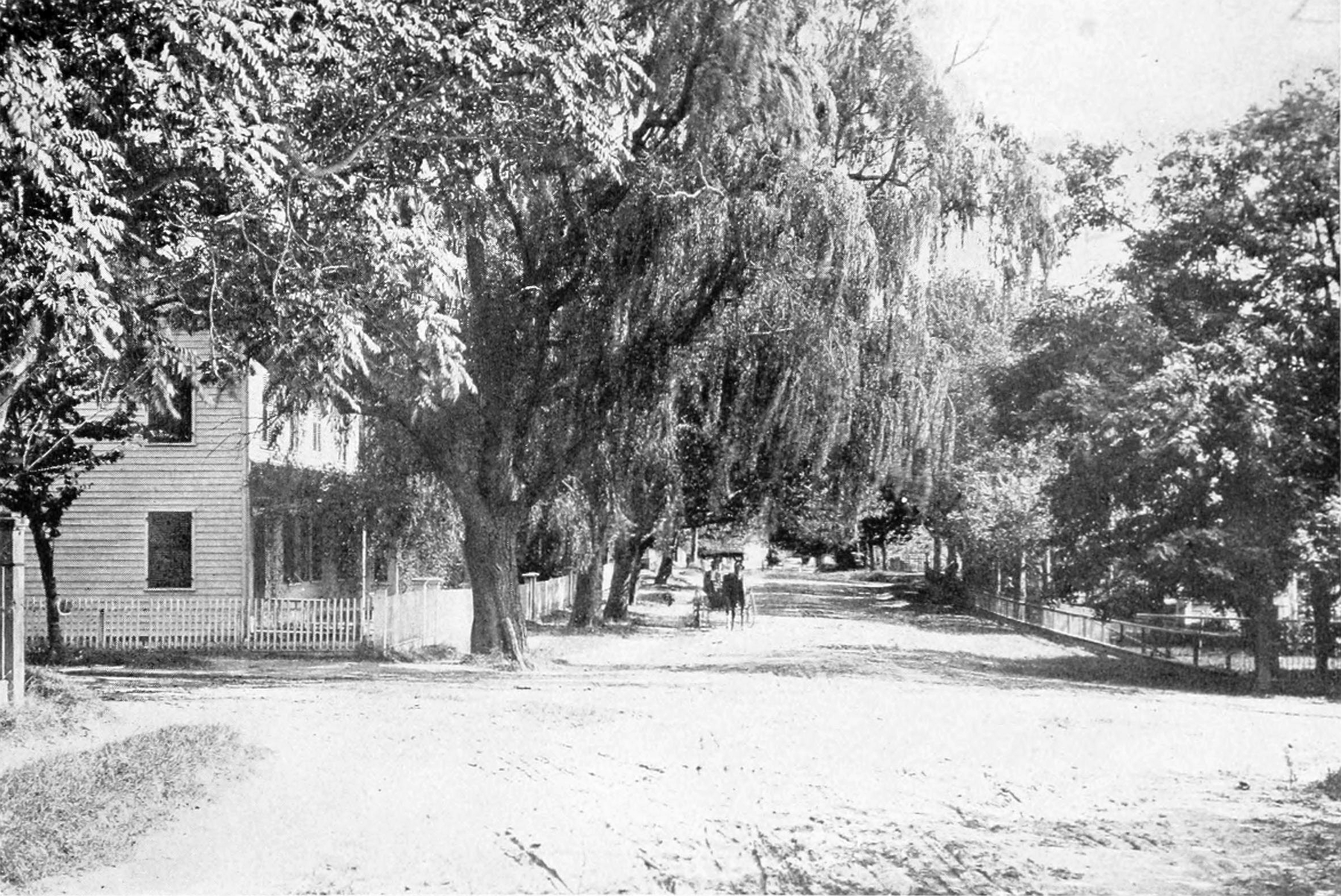
New Suffolk, 1901

The submarine USS Holland (SS-1), the first commissioned submarine in the U.S. Navy, along with five other Holland Torpedo Boat Company-designed submarines of the Plunger class, were based in New Suffolk's Holland Torpedo Boat Station between 1899 and 1905, prompting the hamlet to claim to be the "First Submarine Base" in the United States. The location of the "submarine base" was on 1st Street between Main and King Streets. The name of Mr. Holland's company was changed to Electric Boat during this time.

In 2007, New Suffolk's two-room school house had nine students in grades K-6, making it one of the smallest school districts in the state of New York. The physical location of the school closed down following the 2023-2024 school year, due to a lack of students. The district plans to send students to neighboring Southold school district.

== Geography ==
According to the United States Census Bureau, the hamlet has a total area 0.62 square miles (1.6 km^{2}), of which 0.54 square miles (1.4 km^{2}) is land and 0.04 square miles (0.1 km^{2}), or 8.83%, is water.

== Demographics ==
Historical population
| Census | Pop. | Note | %± |
|---|---|---|---|
| 2020 | 403 | | — |
U.S. Decennial Census

As of the census of 2000, there were 337 people, 172 households, and 98 families residing in the community. The population density was 468.3 inhabitants per square mile (180.8/km^{2}). There were 298 housing units at an average density of 414.1 per square mile (159.9/km^{2}). The racial makeup of the CDP was 94.36% White, 1.19% African American, 0.30% Asian, 1.48% from other races, and 2.67% from two or more races. Hispanic or Latino of any race were 3.56% of the population.

There were 172 households, out of which 16.3% had children under the age of 18 living with them, 45.9% were married couples living together, 6.4% had a female householder with no husband present, and 43.0% were non-families. 34.3% of all households were made up of individuals, and 19.8% had someone living alone who was 65 years of age or older. The average household size was 1.96 and the average family size was 2.44.

In the CDP, the population was spread out, with 12.8% under the age of 18, 3.0% from 18 to 24, 23.1% from 25 to 44, 31.2% from 45 to 64, and 30.0% who were 65 years of age or older. The median age was 53 years. For every 100 females, there were 89.3 males. For every 100 females age 18 and over, there were 89.7 males.

The median income for a household in the community was $51,667, and the median income for a family was $74,688. Males had a median income of $36,875 versus $36,563 for females. The per capita income for the CDP was $32,740. About 4.2% of families and 6.1% of the population were below the poverty line, including none of those under age 18 and 13.0% of those age 65 or over.

== Education ==
The school district is New Suffolk Common School District.
