= List of torpedoes by name =

The list of torpedoes by name includes all torpedoes operated in the past or present.

Name	Country	Dates	Platform/ target	Dimensions	Warhead	Propulsion	Performance
18 in. Mk.V	UK	1899	Destroyer & submarine/ surface	Diameter:17.7 in (450 mm); Length:199.4 in (5,060 mm); Weight:1,353 lb (614 kg)	295 lb (134 kg)	Compressed air	21.5–22.0 kn (39.8–40.7 km/h; 24.7–25.3 mph) for 1,500 yd (1.4 km)
18 in. Mk.VI	UK	1904	Destroyers/ surface	Diameter:18 in (450 mm); Length:211 in (5.4 m)		Compressed air	28.5–41 kn (52.8–75.9 km/h) for 1,000–4,000 yd (910–3,660 m)
18 in. Mk.VII	UK		Destroyers, aircraft & torpedo boats/ surface	Diameter:17.7 in (450 mm); Length:211.4 in (5.37 m)	330 lb (150 kg); TNT	Wet heater	29–35 kn (54–65 km/h) for 4,500–6,000 yd (4.1–5.5 km)
18 in. Mk.VII*	UK		Destroyers, aircraft & torpedo boats/ surface	Diameter:17.7 in (450 mm)	330 lb (150 kg); TNT	Wet heater	29–35 kn; 34–40 mph (54–65 km/h) for 5,000–7,000 yd (4.6–6.4 km)
18 in. Mk.VII	India	1965	Aircraft, surface	Diameter:17.7 in (450 mm)	145 kg (320 lb); TNT	Wet heater	65 km/h (35 kn) for 4.6 km (5,000 yd)
18 in. Mk.VIII	UK	1913	Submarine & aircraft/ surface	Diameter:17.7 in (450 mm)	320 kg (710 lb); TNT	Wet heater	35 kn (65 km/h) for 2,500 yd (2.3 km)
18 in. Mk.XI	UK	1934	Aircraft/ surface	Diameter:17.7 in (450 mm)	465 lb (211 kg); TNT	Burner cycle	35 kn (65 km/h) for 2,500 yd (2.3 km)
18 in. Mk.XII	UK	1937-1945	Aircraft/ surface	Diameter:17.72 in (450 mm); Length:195 in (5,000 mm); Weight:1,548 lb (702 kg)	388 lb (176 kg); TNT	Burner cycle 140 hp (100 kW)	37–40 kn; 43–46 mph (69–74 km/h) for 1,500–3,500 yd (1,400–3,200 m)
18 in. Mk.XIV	UK	1938	Aircraft/	Diameter:17.7 in (450 mm)	370 lb (170 kg); TNT	Whitehead wet heater (methyl fuel)	41–45 kn (76–83 km/h) for 1,600–3,000 yd (1.5–2.7 km)
18 in. Mk.XV	UK	1943	Aircraft & MTBs/	Diameter:450 mm (18 in); Length:5.26 m (17.3 ft)	247 kg (545 lb); Torpex	Burner cycle	61–74 km/h (33–40 kn) for 2.3–3.2 km (2,500–3,500 yd)
18 in. Mk.XVII	UK	1944	Aircraft/	Diameter:450 mm (18 in)	272 kg (600 lb); Torpex	Burner cycle	74 km/h (40 kn) for 2.3 km (2,500 yd)
18 in. Mk.30	UK	1954-1970	/	Diameter:450 mm (18 in)			
21 in. Mk.I	UK		/	Diameter:533 mm (21.0 in)			
21 in. Mk.II	UK	1914	Battleships & battlecruisers	Diameter:533 mm (21.0 in)	235 kg (518 lb); TNT	Wet heater	57–83 km/h (31–45 kn) for 4.1–9.8 km (4,500–10,700 yd)
21 in. Mk.IV	UK	1912	Surface/ surface	Diameter:533 mm (21.0 in); Length:6.9 m (23 ft)	235 kg (518 lb); TNT	Wet heater	46–65 km/h (25–35 kn) for 7.3–12.4 km (8,000–13,600 yd)
21 in. Mk.V	UK	1917	Destroyers & cruisers/ surface	Diameter:533 mm (21.0 in); Length:7.1 m (23 ft)		Wet heater	46–74 km/h (25–40 kn) for 4.6–12.4 km (5,000–13,600 yd)
21 in. Mk.VII	UK	1925	Cruisers/ surface	Diameter:533 mm (21.0 in); Length:7.8 m (26 ft)	336 kg (741 lb); TNT	Oxygen enriched air	65 km/h (35 kn) for 5.2 km (5,700 yd)
21 in. Mk.VIII	UK	1925	Submarines & torpedo boats/ surface	Diameter:533 mm (21.0 in); Length:6.6 m (22 ft)	365 kg (805 lb); Torpex	Burner cycle	65–76 km/h (35–41 kn) for 10–13.7 km (10,900–15,000 yd)
21 in. Mk.X	UK	1939	Submarines, torpedo boats, & destroyers/ surface	Diameter:533 mm (21.0 in); Length:7.2 m (24 ft)	300 kg (660 lb); TNT	Wet heater	54–87 km/h (29–47 kn) for 3–12 km (3,300–13,100 yd)
21 in. Mk.XI	UK	1942	Destroyers/	Diameter:533 mm (21.0 in); Length:6.8 m (22 ft)	322 kg (710 lb); TNT	Electric battery	52 km/h (28 kn) for 5 km (5,500 yd)
21 in. Mk.12	UK	1952	Submarine/	Diameter:533 mm (21.0 in)	340 kg (750 lb); Torpex	Hydrogen peroxide	52 km/h (28 kn) for 5 km (5,500 yd)
21 in. Mk.20 Bidder	UK	1955?	Submarines & surface ships /	Diameter:533 mm (21.0 in)	89 kg (196 lb)		37 km/h (20 kn) for 11 km (12,000 yd)
21 in. Mk.23 Grog	UK	1971?	Submarines	Diameter:533 mm (21.0 in); Length:6.5 m (21 ft)	89 kg (196 lb)	Electric battery	33 km/h (18 kn)
24.5 in. Mk.I	UK	1923	Nelson-class battleships/ surface	Diameter:622 mm (24.5 in); Length:8.103 m (26.58 ft)	743 kg (1,638 lb); TNT	Oxygen enriched air	56–65 km/h (30–35 kn) for 13.7–18.3 km (15,000–20,000 yd)
45 cm Fiume torpedo (Whitehead)	US	1894	Surface/ surface	Diameter:450 mm (17.72 in) Length:3,600 mm (140 in); Weight:383 kg (845 lb)	54 kg (119 lb) wet gun-cotton	Compressed air	49.1 km/h (26.5 kn) for 0.73 km (800 yd)
6-shi	Japan		Submarine/ surface	Diameter:530 mm (21 in); Length:6,800 mm (269 in); Weight:1,432 kg (3,157 lb)	200 kg (441 lb)	Wet heater	48–67 km/h (26–36 kn) for 6,400–13,700 m (7,000–15,000 yd)
8-shi	Japan		Surface/ surface	Diameter:610 mm (24 in); Length:8,400 mm (331 in); Weight:2,362 kg (5,207 lb)	200 kg (441 lb)	Wet heater	48–67 km/h (26–36 kn) for 6,400–13,700 m (7,000–15,000 yd)
A-184	Italy		/	Diameter:533 mm (21.0 in)			
A244-S	Italy		/	Diameter:324 mm (12.8 in); Length:2.8 m (9 ft 2 in)			56–72 km/h (30–39 kn) for 6 km (3.7 mi) (Mod. 1) or 13.5 km (8.4 mi) (Mod. 3); Depth : 600 m (2,000 ft)
AKYA	Turkey	2021	All	Diameter:533 mm (21.0 in); Length:7 m (23 ft); Weight: 1,200 kg (2,600 lb)	350 kg (770 lb)	Electrical	83 km/h (45 kn) for 50 km (55,000 yd)
Advanced Light Weight Torpedo (NSTL)	India	2024	Ship, helicopter or submarine/any	Diameter: 324 mm (12.8 in)	50 kg (110 lb)	Electric	25 km (16 mi) @ 25 kn (46 km/h) or 12 km (7.5 mi) @ 50 kn (93 km/h); Depth : 540 m (1,770 ft)
APR-1	USSR	1960	Aircraft/ submarine	Diameter:450 mm (18 in); Length:3.7 m (12 ft); Weight:650 kg (1,430 lb)	80 kg (180 lb)	Solid-fuel rocket	800 m (2,600 ft); Depth:420 m (1,380 ft)
APR-2	USSR	1980	Aircraft/ submarine	Diameter:350 mm (14 in)	100 kg (220 lb)	Solid-fuel rocket	115 km/h (62 kn) for1.6–2 km (1,700–2,200 yd); Depth:600 m (2,000 ft)
APR-3E	USSR	1990	Aircraft/ submarine	Diameter:350 mm (14 in)	74 kg (163 lb)	Solid-fuel pump-jet	103 km/h (56 kn) for 1.5–2 km (1,600–2,200 yd); Depth:800 m (2,600 ft)
APSET-95	USSR	1995	Aircraft/ submarine	Diameter:400 mm (16 in)	60 kg (130 lb)		93 km/h (50 kn) for 30 km (19 mi)
K731 White Shark	ROK	2003	Submarine/	Diameter:480 mm (19 in)			65 km/h (35 kn) for 30 km (33,000 yd)
Barracuda	Germany	2007	Submarine /			Supercavitating torpedo	800 km/h (430 kn; 500 mph)
K761 Tiger Shark	ROK	2022	Submarine/	Diameter:533 mm (21.0 in); Length:6.5 m (21 ft); Weight:1,619 kg (3,569 lb)			110 km/h (60 kn) for 50 km (55,000 yd)
Black Shark(WASS)	Italy	2004	Submarine/	Diameter:533 mm (21.0 in)	STANAG 4439/ MURAT-2	Contra-rotating direct-drive brushless motor	93 km/h (50 kn) for 50 km (55,000 yd)
Brennan torpedo	UK	1877	Land-based/ surface	Diameter:12.8 in (324 mm)		Wire drum	27 kn (50 km/h) for 2,000 yd (1,800 m)
	Germany	1943	Aircraft/ surface	Diameter:378 mm (14.9 in); Length:2.94 m (9 ft 8 in); Weight:435 kg (959 lb)	200 kg (440 lb)	Unpowered	
C/03	Germany	1903	Surface	Diameter:450 mm (18 in); Length:5.2 m (17 ft)	176 kg (388 lb); TNT	Brotherhood radial engine or wet heater	57 km/h (31 kn) for 1.9 km (2,100 yd)
C/06	Germany	1906	Submarine	Diameter:450 mm (18 in); Length:5.7 m (19 ft)	123 kg (271 lb); TNT	Brotherhood or wet heater	50.0–63.9 km/h (27–34.5 kn) for 1.5–5 km (1,600–5,500 yd)
C/07	Germany	1907	Land-based/ surface	Diameter:450 mm (18 in); Length:5.7 m (19 ft)	110 kg (240 lb); TNT	Brotherhood or wet heater	67 km/h (36 kn) for 1.5 km (1,600 yd)
C35/91	Germany	1890	Torpedo boats & submarines/ surface	Diameter:350 mm (14 in); Length:4.8 m (16 ft)	41 kg (90 lb); TNT	Brotherhood	54 km/h (29 kn) for 400 m (440 yd)
C43	China		/	Diameter:533 mm (21.0 in); Length:6.6 m (22 ft)			
C45/91	Germany	1890	Cruisers & battleships/ surface	Diameter:450 mm (18 in); Length:5.1 m (17 ft)	88 kg (194 lb); TNT	Brotherhood	59 km/h (32 kn) for 500 m (550 yd)
CAPTOR; Encapsulated torpedo ASW mine	US	1979		Diameter:533 mm (21.0 in); Length:3.68 m (12.1 ft)	44 kg (97 lb); PBXN-103	Reciprocating external combustion, Otto fuel II	52 km/h (28 kn) for 7.3 km (8,000 yd)
K745 Blue Shark	ROK	2005	Airplanes & surface ships	Diameter:320 mm (13 in)			83 km/h (45 kn) for 19 km (21,000 yd)
DM1 Seeschlange	Germany	1971	Submarine/ all	Diameter:533 mm (21.0 in); Length:4.2 m (14 ft)	100 kg (220 lb)	Silver–zinc battery	61 km/h (33 kn) for 6 km (6,600 yd)
DM2A1 Seal	Germany	1969	/	Diameter:533 mm (21.0 in)	250 kg (550 lb)		
DM2A3	Germany	1987	/	Diameter:533 mm (21.0 in)	260 kg (570 lb)		
DM2A4 Seehecht	Germany	2006	/	Diameter:533 mm (21.0 in); Length:6.6 m (22 ft)	260 kg (570 lb); PBX		93 km/h (50 kn) for 50 km (55,000 yd)
DST92	USSR		Submarine/ surface	Diameter:650 mm (26 in); Length:11 m (36 ft); Weight:4,750 kg (10,470 lb)	557 kg (1,228 lb)	HTP/ kerosene turbine	Depth:20 m (66 ft)
DT	USSR		Submarine/ surface	Diameter:650 mm (26 in); Length:11 m (36 ft); Weight:4,500 kg (9,900 lb)	450 kg (990 lb)	HTP/ kerosene turbine	
ET32	China		Aircraft/ all	Diameter:533 mm (21.0 in); Length:6.6 m (22 ft); Weight:1,340 kg (2,950 lb)	190 kg (420 lb)	Electrical battery	65 km/h (35 kn; 40 mph) for 18 km (20,000 yd); Depth:350 m (1,150 ft)
ET34	China		Aircraft/ all	Diameter:533 mm (21.0 in)		Electrical battery	74–78 km/h (40–42 kn; 46–48 mph) for 18–25 km (20,000–27,000 yd); Depth:300 m (980 ft)
ET36	China		Aircraft/ all	Diameter:533 mm (21.0 in)		Electrical battery	46–67 km/h (25–36 kn; 29–42 mph) for 10–25 km (11,000–27,000 yd); Depth:300 m (980 ft)
ET52	China		Aircraft/ all	Diameter:324 mm (12.8 in)			
ET-46	USSR	1946	Aircraft/ submarine	Diameter:533 mm (21.0 in)	450 kg (990 lb)		57 km/h (31 kn) for 6 km (3.7 mi)
F5	Germany	1935	Aircraft/	Diameter:450 mm (18 in); Length:5.2 m (17 ft)	250 kg (550 lb) Hexanite	Decalin wet heater	74 km/h (40 kn) for 2 km (2,200 yd)
F17	France		/	Diameter:533 mm (21.0 in)	250 kg (550 lb)		74 km/h (40 kn) for 20 km (22,000 yd)
F21	France		/	Diameter:534 mm (21.0 in)			93 km/h (50 kn)
G6	Germany	1908	Surface & submarines/ surface	Diameter:500 mm (20 in); Length:6 m (20 ft)	164 kg (362 lb); TNT/Hexanite	Decalin or kerosene wet heater	65 km/h (35 kn) for 3.5 km (3,800 yd)
G7	Germany	1910	Capital ships/ surface	Diameter:500 mm (20 in); Length:7 m (23 ft)	195 kg (430 lb) Hexanite	Decalin wet heater	69 km/h (37 kn) for 4 km (4,400 yd)
G7a	Germany	1930	Surface ships & submarines	Diameter:533 mm (21.0 in); Length:7.2 m (24 ft)	320 kg (710 lb) Hexanite	Decalin wet heater	81 km/h (44 kn) for 5 km (5,500 yd)
G7e (G7e/T2, G7e/T3, and G7e/T4 Falke)	Germany	1930	Surface ships & submarines/	Diameter:533 mm (21.0 in); Length:7.16 m (23.5 ft)	280 kg (620 lb) Schießwolle 36	Electric 75 kW (100 hp)	T3 - 56 km/h (30 kn) for 5 km (5,500 yd)
G7es (Zaunkönig T-5/GNAT)	Germany	1943-1945	Surface ships & submarines/	Diameter:533 mm (21.0 in)	280 kg (620 lb) Schießwolle 36	Electric	44 km/h (24 kn) for 5.7 km (6,200 yd)
H8	Germany	1912	Surface/ surface	Diameter:600 mm (24 in); Length:8 m (26 ft)	210 kg (460 lb) Hexanite	Brotherhood wet heater	67 km/h (36 kn) for 6 km (6,600 yd)
Helmover	UK	1945	Aircraft/ surface	Diameter:1,000 mm (39.5 in); Length:8.8 m (29 ft); Weight:5,200 kg (11,500 lb)	1,000 kg (2,200 lb); RDX	Internal combustion	range 40 km (25 mi)
Hoot (missile) (super-cavitating torpedo)	Iran	2006	Submarine/ surface			Supercavitation torpedo	370 km/h (200 kn)
Howell torpedo	US	1889-1898	/	Diameter:360 mm (14 in); Length:3.3 m (11 ft)	96 kg (212 lb)	Flywheel	46 km/h (25 kn) for 370 m (400 yd)
K745A1 Red Shark	ROK	2009	Surface/ surface	Diameter:380 mm (15 in)		Homing torpedo, anti-submarine rocket	83 km/h (45 kn) for 17 km (19,000 yd)
Kaiten Type 1 manned torpedo	Japan	1944	Submarine/ surface	Diameter:1,000 mm (39 in); Length:14.75 m (48.4 ft); Weight:8,255 kg (18,199 lb)	1,550 kg (3,420 lb)	Wet heater, reciprocating 440 kW (590 hp), kerosene and oxygen	19–56 km/h (10–30 kn) for 23–78 km (25,000–85,000 yd); Depth: 80 m (260 ft)
Kolibri	USSR	1978	Aircraft/ submarine	Diameter:330 mm (13 in)	44 kg (97 lb)		45 kn (83 km/h)
LCAW (WASS)	Italy	1992	Aircraft & hand launcher/ Swimmers & minisubs	Diameter:124 mm (4.9 in); Length:0.9–2 m (2 ft 11 in – 6 ft 7 in); 11.3–16 kg (25–35 lb)	Shaped charge	Silver–zinc battery	33 km/h (18 kn) for 0.7–8 km (770–8,750 yd)
Bliss-Leavitt Mark 1	US	1904-1922	Submarine/ surface	Diameter:21 in (530 mm); Length:197 in (5,000 mm); Weight:1,500 lb (680 kg)	200 lb (91 kg) wet guncotton	Vertical turbine wheel	27 kn (50 km/h) for 4,000 yd (3.7 km)
Bliss-Leavitt Mark 2	US	1905-1922	Submarine/ surface	Diameter:21 in (530 mm); Length:197 in (5,000 mm); Weight:1,500 lb (680 kg)	200 lb (91 kg) wet guncotton	Turbine (contra-rotating)	26 kn (48 km/h) for 3,500 yd (3.2 km)
Bliss-Leavitt Mark 3	US	1906-1922	Submarine/ surface	Diameter:21 in (530 mm); Length:197 in (5,000 mm); Weight:1,500 lb (680 kg)	200 lb (91 kg) wet guncotton	Turbine (contra-rotating)	26 kn (48 km/h) for 4,000 yd (3.7 km)
Bliss-Leavitt Mark 4	US	1908-1922	Submarine/ surface	Diameter:17.72 in (450 mm); Length:197 in (5,000 mm); Weight:1,500 lb (680 kg)		Vertical Turbine	
Bliss-Leavitt Mark 6	US	1911-1922	Submarine/ surface	Diameter:17.72 in (450 mm); Length:204 in (5,200 mm); Weight:1,800 lb (820 kg)		Turbine	35 kn (65 km/h) for 2,000 yd (1,800 m)
Bliss-Leavitt Mark 7	US	1912-1945	Submarine/ surface	Diameter:17.72 in (450 mm); Length:204 in (5,200 mm); Weight:1,682 lb (763 kg)	Mk.7 Mod 5; 326 lb (148 kg); TNT	Turbine	35 kn (65 km/h) for 3,500–6,000 yd (3,200–5,500 m)
Bliss-Leavitt Mark 7 Short Torpedo (Type D)	US		Submarine/ surface	Diameter:17.72 in (450 mm); Length:144 in (3,700 mm); Weight:1,036 lb (470 kg)	150 lb (68 kg); HBX	Seawater battery	Speed:35 kn (65 km/h) for 2,000 yd (1,800 m)
Bliss-Leavitt Mark 8	US	1911-1945	Submarine/ surface	Diameter:21 in (530 mm); Length:256.3 in (6,510 mm); Weight:2,600 lb (1,200 kg)	Mk.8 Mod 4; 466 lb (211 kg); TNT	Turbine	36 kn (67 km/h) for 16,000 yd (15 km)
Bliss-Leavitt Mark 9	US	1915-1945	Submarine/ surface	Diameter:21 in (530 mm); Length:197 in (5,000 mm); Weight:2,015 lb (914 kg)	Mk.9; 210 lb (95 kg); TNT	Turbine	27 kn (50 km/h) for 7,000 yd (6,400 m)
Mark 10	US	1915-1945	Surface/ surface	Diameter:21 in (530 mm); Length:195 in (5,000 mm); Weight:2,215 lb (1,005 kg)	Mk.10 Mod.3; 497 lb (225 kg); TNT	Steam turbine	36 kn (67 km/h) for 3,500 yd (3,200 m)
Mark 11	US	1926-1945	Surface/ surface	Diameter:21 in (530 mm); Length:271 in (6,900 mm); Weight:3,511 lb (1,593 kg)	Mk.11; 500 lb (230 kg); TNT	Turbine	27–46 kn (50–85 km/h) for 6,000–15,000 yd (5,500–13,700 m)
Mark 12	US	1928-1945	Surface/ surface	Diameter:21 in (530 mm); Length:271 in (6,900 mm); Weight:3,505 lb (1,590 kg)	Mk.11; 500 lb (230 kg); TNT	Turbine	27.5–44 kn (50.9–81.5 km/h) for 7,000–15,000 yd (6,400–13,700 m)
Mark 13	US	1936-1950	GT-1 (missile) & Aircraft/ surface	Diameter:22.5 in (570 mm); Length:161 in (4,100 mm); Weight:2,216 lb (1,005 kg)	Mk.13; 600 lb (270 kg); Torpex	Mechanical	33.5 kn (62.0 km/h) for 6,300 yd (5,800 m)
Mark 14	US	1938	Submarine/ surface	Diameter:21 in (530 mm); Length:246 in (6,200 mm); Weight:3,209 lb (1,456 kg)	Mk.16 Mod.6; 643 lb (292 kg); HBX	Turbine	31.1–46.3 kn (57.6–85.7 km/h) for 4,500–9,000 yd (4,100–8,200 m)
Mark 15	US	1938-1956	Surface/ surface	Diameter:21 in (530 mm); Length:288 in (7,300 mm); Weight:3,841 lb (1,742 kg)	Mk.7 Mod.3; 825 lb (374 kg); HBX	Turbine	26.5–45 kn (49.1–83.3 km/h) for 6,000–15,000 yd (5,500–13,700 m)
Mark 16	US	1943-1975	Submarine/ surface	Diameter:21 in (530 mm); Length:246 in (6,200 mm); Weight:4,000 lb (1,800 kg)	Mk.16 Mod.7; 746 lb (338 kg); HBX	Turbine	46.2 kn (85.6 km/h) for 11,000 yd (10,000 m)
Mark 17	US	1944-1950	Destroyer/ surface	Diameter:21 in (530 mm); Length:288 in (7,300 mm); Weight:4,600 lb (2,100 kg)	Mk.17 Mod.3; 879.5 lb (398.9 kg); HBX	Turbine	46 kn (85 km/h) for 18,000 yd (16,000 m)
Mark 18	US	1943-1950	Submarine/ surface	Diameter:21 in (530 mm); Length:245 in (6,200 mm); Weight:3,154 lb (1,431 kg)	Mk.18 Mod.3; 575 lb (261 kg); HBX	Electric	29 kn (54 km/h) for 4,000 yd (3,700 m)
Mark 19	US		Submarine/ surface	Diameter:21 in (530 mm); Length:246 in (6,200 mm); Weight:3,240 lb (1,470 kg)	Mk.20; 800 lb (360 kg); Torpex	Electric, secondary battery	29 kn (54 km/h) for 4,000 yd (3,700 m)
Mark 20	US		Submarine/ surface	Diameter:21 in (530 mm); Length:246 in (6,200 mm); Weight:3,100 lb (1,400 kg)	Mk.20; 500 lb (230 kg); TNT	Electric	33 kn (61 km/h) for 3,500 yd (3.2 km)
Mark 21 Mod.0	US		Aircraft/ surface	Diameter:22.5 in (570 mm); Length:161 in (4,100 mm); Weight:2,300 lb (1,000 kg)	400 lb (180 kg); TNT (ca.)	Electric	25 kn (46 km/h)
Mark 21 Mod.2	US		Faichild Petrel/ surface	Diameter:22.5 in (570 mm); Length:161 in (4,100 mm); Weight:2,130 lb (970 kg)	Mk.21; 350 lb (160 kg); HBX-3	Steam turbine	33.5 kn (62.0 km/h) for 6,000 yd (5.5 km)
Mark 22	US		Submarine/ surface	Diameter:21 in (530 mm); Length:246 in (6,200 mm); Weight:3,060 lb (1,390 kg)	500 lb (230 kg); HBX	Electric	29 kn (54 km/h) for 4,000 yd (3.7 km)
Mark 23	US	1943-1946	Submarine/ surface	Diameter:21 in (530 mm); Length:246 in (6,200 mm); Weight:3,259 lb (1,478 kg)	Mk.16 Mod.6; 643 lb (292 kg); HBX	Turbine	46.3 kn (85.7 km/h) for 4,500 yd (4.1 km)
Mark 24 Mod 0 Tigerfish	UK	1980	Submarine/ submarine	Diameter:533 mm (21.0 in); Length:6.5 m (21 ft)	340 kg (750 lb); Torpex	Silver–zinc batteries	65 km/h (35 kn) for 21 km (23,000 yd); 44 km/h (24 kn); Depth : 350 m (1,150 ft)
Mark 24 Mod 1 Tigerfish	UK	1979	All	Diameter:533 mm (21.0 in); Length:6.5 m (21 ft)	340 kg (750 lb); Torpex	Silver–zinc batteries	65 km/h (35 kn) for 21 km (23,000 yd); 44 km/h (24 kn); Depth : 442 m (1,450 ft)
Mark 24(N) Tigerfish	UK		All	Diameter:533 mm (21.0 in); Length:6.5 m (21 ft)	Nuclear, 10 kt	Silver–zinc batteries	35 kn (65 km/h) for 23,000 yd (21 km); 24 kn (44 km/h); Depth : 442 m (1,450 ft)
Mark 24 Mod 2 Tigerfish	UK	1984	Submarine	Diameter:533 mm (21.0 in); Length:6.5 m (21 ft)	340 kg (750 lb); Torpex	Silver–zinc batteries	65 km/h (35 kn) for 21 km (23,000 yd); 44 km/h (24 kn); Depth: 442 m (1,450 ft)
Mark 25	US		Aircraft/ surface	Diameter:22.5 in (570 mm); Length:161 in (4.1 m); Weight:2,306 lb (1,046 kg)	Mk.25; 725 lb (329 kg); HBX	Alcohol turbine	40 kn (74 km/h) for 2,500 yd (2.3 km)
Mark 26	US		Submarine/ surface	Diameter:21 in (530 mm); Length:246 in (6.2 m); Weight:3,200 lb (1,500 kg)	Mk.26; 900–1,000 lb (410–450 kg); HBX	Seawater battery	40 kn (74 km/h) for 6,000 yd (5.5 km)
Mark 27 Mod.0	US	1943-1946	Submarine/ surface	Diameter:19 in (480 mm); Length:90 in (2.3 m); Weight:720 lb (330 kg)	Mk.27 Mod.0	Electric, secondary battery	12 kn (22 km/h) search for 12 minutes at 5,000 yd (4.6 km)
Mark 27 Mod 4	US	1943-1960	Submarine/ surface	Diameter:19 in (480 mm); Length:125.75 in (3.194 m); Weight:720 lb (330 kg)	Mk.27 Mod.2; 128 lb (58 kg); HBX	Electric	15.9 kn (29.4 km/h) search for 12 minutes at 6,200 yd (5.7 km)
Mark 28	US	1944-1960	Submarine/ surface	Diameter:21 in (530 mm); Length:246 in (6.2 m); Weight:2,800 lb (1,300 kg)	Mk.28 Mod.2; 585 lb (265 kg); HBX	Electric	19.6 kn (36.3 km/h) for 6 minutes at 4,000 yd (3.7 km)
Mark 29	US		Submarine/ surface	Diameter:21 in (530 mm); Length:246 in (6.2 m); Weight:3,200 lb (1,500 kg)	Mk.28 Mod.2; 550 lb (250 kg); HBX	Electric	21–28 kn (39–52 km/h) for 4,000–12,000 yd (3,700–11,000 m)
Mark 30 torpedo mine	US		Aircraft/ submarine	Diameter:10 in (250 mm); Length:96 in (2.4 m); Weight:265 lb (120 kg)	Mk.30; 50 lb (23 kg)	Electric	12 kn (22 km/h) for 3,000 yd (2.7 km)
Mark 31	US		Destroyer/ surface	Diameter:21 in (530 mm); Length:246 in (6.2 m); Weight:2,800 lb (1,300 kg)	Mk.31; 500 lb (230 kg); HBX	Electric	29 kn (54 km/h) for 4,000 yd (3.7 km)
Mark 32	US	1950-1955	Surface/ submarine	Diameter:19 in (480 mm); Length:83 in (2.1 m); Weight:700 lb (320 kg)	Mk.32 Mod.1; 107 lb (49 kg); HBX	Electric	12 kn (22 km/h) search for 24 minutes at 9,600 yd (8.8 km)
Mark 33 Mod.0	US		Submarine/ all	Diameter:21 in (530 mm); Length:83 in (2.1 m); Weight:1,795 lb (814 kg)	550 lb (250 kg); HBX	Electric	12.5–18.5 kn (23.2–34.3 km/h) for 5,000–19,000 yd (4,600–17,400 m)
Mark 34 Mod.1(Mine Mk 44)	US	1948-1958	Aircraft/ all	Diameter:19 in (480 mm); Length:125 in (3.2 m); Weight:1,150 lb (520 kg)	Mk.34 Mod.1; 116 lb (53 kg); HBX	Electric	Search:11 kn (20 km/h) search for 30 minutes at 12,000 yd (11 km); Attack:17 kn (31 km/h) search for 6–8 minutes at 3,600 yd (3.3 km)
Mark 35	US	1949-1960	Surface/ surface	Diameter:21 in (530 mm); Length:83 in (2.1 m); Weight:1,770 lb (800 kg)	Mk.35 Mod.2 or 3; 270 lb (120 kg); HBX	Electric, primary seawater battery	27 kn (50 km/h) for 15,000 yd (14 km)
Mark 36 Mod.0	US	1949-1960	Surface/ surface	Diameter:21 in (530 mm); Length:246 in (6.2 m); Weight:4,000 lb (1,800 kg)	Mk.36; 800 lb (360 kg); HBX-1	Electric	47 kn (87 km/h) for 7,000 yd (6.4 km)
Mark 37 (Mod.0 & Mod.3)	US	1956	Submarine/ submarine	Diameter:19 in (480 mm); Length:135 in (3.4 m); Weight:1,430 lb (650 kg)	Mk.37 Mod.0; 330 lb (150 kg); HBX-3	Electric	
Mark 37 (Mod.1 & Mod.2)	US	1960	Submarine/ submarine	Diameter:19 in (480 mm); Length:161 in (4.1 m); Weight:1,690 lb (770 kg)	Mk.37 Mod.0; 330 lb (150 kg); HBX-3	Electric	
Mark 39	US	1946-1956	Submarine/ submarine	Diameter:19 in (480 mm); Length:133 in (3.4 m); Weight:1,275 lb (578 kg)	Mk.39 Mod.0; 130 lb (59 kg); HBX	Electric	15.5 kn (28.7 km/h) for 26 mins at 13,000 yd (12 km)
Mark 41 Mod.0	US		Aircraft/ submarine	Diameter:21 in (530 mm); Length:120 in (3.0 m); Weight:1,327 lb (602 kg)	Mk.41; 150 lb (68 kg); HBX	Seawater battery	25 kn (46 km/h) for 8,000 yd (7.3 km)
Mark 43 Mod.0	US	1951-1957	Aircraft/ submarine	Diameter:12.75 in (324 mm); Length:88.25 in (2.242 m); Weight:370.4 lb (168.0 kg)	Mk.43 Mod.0; 60 lb (27 kg); HBX	Electric	20 kn (37 km/h) for 4,300 yd (3.9 km)
Mark 43 Mod.1	US	1951-1957	Aircraft/ submarine	Diameter:10 in (250 mm); Length:91.5 in (2.32 m); Weight:260 lb (120 kg)	Mk.43 Mod.1; 54 lb (24 kg); HBX	Electric	15 kn (28 km/h) for 9 minutes at 4,500 yd (4.1 km)
Mark 43 Mod.3	US	1951-1957	Aircraft/ submarine	Diameter:10 in (250 mm); Length:91.5 in (2.32 m); Weight:260 lb (120 kg)	Mk.100; 54 lb (24 kg); HBX	Electric	21 kn (39 km/h) for 6 minutes at 4,500 yd (4.1 km)
Mark 44 Mod.0	US	1957-1967	Aircraft & Destroyers/ submarine	Diameter:12.75 in (324 mm); Length:100 in (2.5 m); Weight:425 lb (193 kg)	Mk.101; 75 lb (34 kg); HBX-3	Seawater battery	
Mark 44 Mod.1	US	1957-1967	Aircraft & Destroyers/ submarine	Diameter:12.75 in (324 mm); Length:101.3 in (2.57 m); Weight:433 lb (196 kg)	Mk.101 Mod.0; 73 lb (33 kg); HBX-3	Seawater battery	
Mark 45 Mod.0	US	1958-1976	Submarine/ all	Diameter:19 in (480 mm); Length:225 in (5.7 m); Weight:2,330 lb (1,060 kg)	W34 Nuclear warhead	Electric	
Mark 45 Mod.1 ASTOR	US	1958-1976	Submarine/ all	Diameter:19 in (480 mm); Length:227 in (5.8 m); Weight:2,213 lb (1,004 kg)	Mark 102 conventional warhead	Electric	
Mark 46 Mod.0	US	1963	Aircraft & Destroyers/ submarine	Diameter:12.75 in (324 mm); Length:102 in (2.6 m); Weight:568 lb (258 kg)	Mk.103 Mod.0	Solid propellent piston engine	
Mark 46 Mod.1	US	1963	Aircraft & Destroyers/ submarine	Diameter:324 mm (12.75 in); Length:102 in (2.6 m); Weight:508 lb (230 kg)	Mk.103 Mod.0	Otto fuel piston engine	
Mark 48	US	1972	All	Diameter:21.0 in (533 mm)	650 lb (290 kg)	Piston engine pump jet	
Mark 48 Mod.1	US	1971	Submarine/ all	Diameter:12.75 in (324 mm); Length:102 in (2.6 m); Weight:508 lb (230 kg)	Mk.107	Otto fuel piston engine	
Mark 50	US	1991	Submarine	Diameter:12.8 in (324 mm)	PBX shaped charge	Sulfur hexafluoride lithium battery	1,900 ft (580 m) for 40 kn (74 km/h)
Mark 54 LHT	US	2004	Submarine	Diameter:12.8 in (324 mm); Length:106.9 in (2,720 mm); Weight:608 lb (276 kg)	PBXN-103	Otto fuel II	40 kn (74 km/h; 46 mph) for 10,000 yd (9.1 km)
MGT-1	USSR	1961	Submarine/ surface	Diameter:400 mm (16 in)	80 kg (180 lb)		52 km/h (28 kn) for 6 km (6,600 yd)
MU90 Impact	France Italy	1993	Submarine	Diameter:323.7 mm (12.74 in); Length:2.85 m (9 ft 4 in)	32.7 kg (72 lb) Shaped charge warhead	Electric pump-jet	93 km/h (50 kn) for 10 km (11,000 yd), Depth: 1,000 m (3,300 ft)
ORKA	Turkey		Surface, Aircraft & UAV/ submarine	Diameter:324 mm (12.8 in)	hollow charge warhead	Electrical pump-jet	83 km/h (45 kn) for 25 km (27,000 yd)
RAT-52	USSR	1952	Aircraft/	Diameter:450 mm (18 in)	240 kg (530 lb)	Solid-fuel rocket	Dash speed:560–740 km/h; 350–460 mph (300–400 kn) Cruise speed:107–126 km/h; 67–78 mph (58–68 kn) for 10 km (6.2 mi) then 520 m (570 yd)
SET-72	USSR	1972	Aircraft/	Diameter:400 mm (16 in)	60–100 kg (130–220 lb)		74 km/h (40 kn) for 8 km (5.0 mi)
Spearfish	UK	1994	Submarine/	Diameter:533 mm (21.0 in); Length:7 m (23 ft)	300 kg (660 lb); Torpex	Sundstrand gas-turbine pump-jet HAP-Otto fuel II	110 km/h (60 kn) for 21 km (23,000 yd)
SST-3 Seal	Germany	1972	/	Diameter:533 mm (21.0 in)			
SST-4 Seal	Germany	1980	/	Diameter:533 mm (21.0 in)			
Sting Ray	UK	1994	/	Diameter:325 mm (12.8 in); Length:2.6 m (8 ft 6 in)	45 kg (99 lb); Torpex shaped charge	Magnesium/silver chloride seawater battery	83 km/h (45 kn) for 8 km (8,700 yd)
SUT	Germany	1967	/	Diameter:533 mm (21.0 in)			
TAN-12	USSR	1932	/	Diameter:450 mm (18 in)			
TAV-15	USSR	1932	/	Diameter:450 mm (18 in)			
TEST-71	USSR		/				
Takshak	India		Surface or Submarine/ submarine	Diameter:533 mm (21.0 in); Length: 6.4 m (21 ft)		Electric battery	Depth: 600 m (2,000 ft)
Shakti	India		Surface/ submarine			Thermal propulsion	Depth: 600 m (2,000 ft)
Torped 47	Sweden	2022	Submarine & surface	Diameter:400 mm (16 in); Length:2.85 m (9 ft 4 in); Weight:340 kg (750 lb)	PBX	Lithium	74 km/h (40 kn)+ for 20 km (12 mi)+
Torped 61	Sweden	1965	/	Diameter:533 mm (21.0 in); Length:7 m (23 ft); Weight:1,755–1,800 kg (3,869–3,968 lb)	235–250 kg (518–551 lb)	Compressed air	24 km (15 mi) at 56 km/h (30 kn)
Torped 613	Sweden	1983	/	Diameter:533 mm (21.0 in); Length:7 m (23 ft)	300 kg (660 lb)		
Torped 62 (Torped 2000)	Sweden	2000	/	Diameter:533 mm (21.0 in); Length:7 m (23 ft); Weight:1,450 kg (3,200 lb)			40 kn (74 km/h) for 40 km (25 mi)
Torped 45	Sweden	1995	/	Diameter:400 mm (16 in); Length:2,850 mm (112.2 in); Weight:320.0 kg (705.5 lb)			
Shyena	India	2012	Ship, helicopter or submarine/any	Diameter:324 mm (12.8 in); Length:2.75 m (9 ft 0 in); Weight:220 kg (490 lb)	50 kg (110 lb)	Electric	61 km/h (33 kn); Depth : 540 m (1,770 ft) for 19 km (12 mi)
ASROC	Japan	2007	Surface/ submarine	Diameter:324 mm (12.8 in)			
Type 12	Japan		/	Diameter:324 mm (12.8 in)			
Type 45	USSR	1936	/	Diameter:450 mm (18 in)			
Type 53	USSR	1927	/	Diameter:533 mm (21.0 in)			
Type 53-58	USSR	1968	/	Diameter:533 mm (21.0 in)	10 kt nuclear warhead		
Type 65-73	USSR	1973	Submarine/ all	Diameter:650 mm (26 in); Length:9.14 m (30.0 ft)	20 kt nuclear warhead	HTP/ Kerosene turbine	50–56 km/h (31–35 mph) for 50–100 km (31–62 mi)
Type 65-76 Kit	USSR	1976	Submarine/ all	Diameter:650 mm (26 in); Length:9.14 m (30.0 ft)	450–557 kg (992–1,228 lb)	HTP/ Kerosene turbine	50–56 km/h (31–35 mph) for 50–100 km (31–62 mi)
Type 72	Japan	1972	/	Diameter:533 mm (21.0 in)			
Type 73	Japan	1973	/	Diameter:324 mm (12.8 in)			
Type 80 torpedo (G-RX1)	Japan	1980	/	Diameter:480 mm (19 in)			
Type 89 torpedo (G-RX2)	Japan	1989	Submarine/ all	Diameter:533 mm (21.0 in); Length:5.6 m (221 in); Weight:980 kg (2,161 lb)	267 kg (589 lb)	Electric	74–130 km/h (40–70 kn) for 27–39 km (17–24 mi); Depth:900 m (3,000 ft)
Type 91 Model 1	Japan	1931-1945	Aircraft/ surface	Diameter:450 mm (18 in); Length:5.27 m (17.3 ft); Weight:848 kg (1,870 lb)	324 kg (714 lb)		78 km/h (48 mph) for 2 km (2,200 yd)
Type 91 Model 2	Japan	1941-1945	Aircraft/ surface	Diameter:450 mm (18 in); Length:5.27 m (17.3 ft); Weight:838 kg (1,847 lb)	204 kg (450 lb)		78 km/h (48 mph) for 2 km (2,200 yd)
Type 91 Model 3	Japan	1942-1945	Aircraft/ surface	Diameter:450 mm (18 in); Length:5.27 m (17.3 ft); Weight:848 kg (1,870 lb)	235 kg (518 lb)		78 km/h (48 mph) for 2 km (2,200 yd)
Type 91 Model 3 Improved	Japan	1943-1945	Aircraft/ surface	Diameter:450 mm (18 in); Length:5.27 m (17.3 ft); Weight:848 kg (1,870 lb)	235 kg (518 lb)		76 km/h (47 mph) for 2 km (2,200 yd)
Type 91 Model 3 Strong	Japan	1944-1945	Aircraft/ surface	Diameter:450 mm (18 in); Length:5.27 m (17.3 ft); Weight:324 kg (714 lb)	235 kg (518 lb)		76 km/h (47 mph) for 1,500 m (1,600 yd)
Type 91 Model 4 Strong	Japan	1944-1945	Aircraft/ surface	Diameter:450 mm (18 in); Length:5.27 m (17.3 ft); Weight:920 kg (2,030 lb)	308 kg (679 lb)		76 km/h (47 mph) for 1,500 m (1,600 yd)
Type 91 Model 7 Strong	Japan	1944-1945	Aircraft/ surface	Diameter:450 mm (18 in); Length:5.27 m (17.3 ft); Weight:1,080 kg (2,380 lb)	420 kg (930 lb)		76 km/h (47 mph) for 1,500 m (1,600 yd)
Type 92	Japan	1932-1945	Submarine/ surface	Diameter:530 mm (21 in); Length:7.14 m (23.4 ft); Weight:1,720 kg (3,792 lb)	300 kg (660 lb)	Battery	55 km/h (34 mph) for 7 km (7,700 yd)
Type 93 Long Lance	Japan	1932-1945	Surface/ surface	Diameter:610 mm (24 in); Length:9 m (30 ft); Weight:2,700 kg (5,952 lb)	490 kg (1,080 lb)	Kerosene–oxygen wet heater	36–96 km/h (19–52 kn) for 20–40 km (22,000–44,000 yd)
Type 95	Japan	1935-1945	Submarine/ surface	Diameter:533 mm (21.0 in); Length:7.1 m (23 ft); Weight:Mod.1; 1,665 kg (3,671 lb) or Mod.2; 1,730 kg (3,810 lb)	Mod.1; 405 kg (893 lb) or Mod.2; 550 kg (1,210 lb)	Kerosene–oxygen wet heater	83–94 km/h (52–58 mph) for 9–12 km (9,800–13,100 yd) (Mod 1)
Type 97 & Type 97 Special	Japan	1937	Midget submarine/ surface	Diameter:450 mm (18 in); Length:5,600 mm (221 in); Weight:980 kg (2,161 lb)	350 kg (770 lb)	Kerosene–oxygen wet heater	81 km/h (44 kn) for 5.5 km (6,000 yd)
Type 97 lightweight	Japan	1997	/	Diameter:324 mm (12.8 in)			
UMGT-1	USSR	1981	/	Diameter:450 mm (18 in)	60 kg (130 lb); 85RU Rastrub/ RPK-6 Vodopad		76 km/h (41 kn) for 8 km (8,700 yd); Depth:500 m (1,600 ft)
USET-80	USSR	1980	Submarine/	Diameter:533 mm (21.0 in)	200–300 kg (440–660 lb)		74–93 km/h (40–50 kn) for 20 km (12 mi); Depth:400 m (1,300 ft)
UGST	USSR	1990	Submarine/ all	Diameter:533 mm (21.0 in)	200 kg (440 lb)		93 km/h (50 kn) for 40 km (25 mi); Depth:500 m (1,600 ft)
VA-111 Shkval	USSR	1977	Submarine/ submarine	Diameter:533 mm (21.0 in); Length:8.2 m (27 ft)	210 kg (460 lb) or 150 kt nuclear warhead	Supercavitating torpedo, high-test peroxide/ kerosene rocket	370 km/h (200 kn) for 7 km (7,700 yd)
Shkval 2	Russia	1998	Submarine/ submarine	Diameter:533 mm (21.0 in); Length:8.2 m (27 ft)	210 kg (460 lb) or 150 kt nuclear warhead	Supercavitating torpedo high-test peroxide/kerosene rocket	370 km/h (200 kn) for 15 km (16,000 yd)
Varunastra	India	2016	Surface/ submarine	Diameter:533 mm (21.0 in); Length:7 m (23 ft); Weight:1,500 kg (3,300 lb)	250 kg (550 lb)	Silver Zinc Battery	74 km/h (40 kn) for 40 km (25 mi); Depth: 400 m (1,300 ft)
VTT-1 Strizh	USSR	1976	Helicopter/ submarine	Diameter:450 mm (18 in)	70 kg (150 lb)		52 km/h (28 kn) for 5 km (5,500 yd); Depth:200 m (660 ft)
Whitehead torpedo Mk.1 (short)	US	1894-1913	Surface/ surface	Diameter:17.7 in (450 mm); Length:140 in (3,600 mm); Weight:845 lb (383 kg)	118 lb (54 kg) wet guncotton	Air-flask Brotherhood engine	26.5 kn (49.1 km/h) for 800 yd (730 m)
Whitehead torpedo Mk.1 (long)	US	1894-1922	Surface/ surface	Diameter:17.7 in (450 mm); Length:197 in (5,000 mm); Weight:1,160 lb (530 kg)	220 lb (100 kg) wet guncotton	Air-flask Brotherhood engine	27.5 kn (50.9 km/h) for 800 yd (730 m)
Whitehead torpedo Mk.2 (short)	US	1896-1913	Surface/ surface	Diameter:17.7 in (450 mm); Length:140 in (3.6 m); Weight:845 lb (383 kg)	118 lb (54 kg) wet guncotton	Air-flask Brotherhood engine	27 kn (50 km/h) for 800 yd (730 m)
Whitehead torpedo Mk.2 (long)	US	1895?-1922	Surface/ surface	Diameter:17.7 in (450 mm); Length:197 in (5.0 m); Weight:1,232 lb (559 kg)	132 lb (60 kg) wet guncotton	Air-flask Brotherhood engine	28.5 kn (52.8 km/h) for 1,500 yd (1,400 m)
Whitehead torpedo Mk.3	US	1898-1922	Surface/ surface	Diameter:17.7 in (450 mm); Length:140 in (3.6 m); Weight:845 lb (383 kg)	118 lb (54 kg) wet guncotton	Air-flask Brotherhood engine	26.5 kn (49.1 km/h) for 800 yd (730 m)
Whitehead torpedo Mk.5	US	1910-1922	Surface/ surface	Diameter:17.7 in (450 mm); Length:204 in (5.2 m); Weight:1,452 lb (659 kg)	200 lb (91 kg) wet guncotton	Heated Air-flask Brotherhood engine	27–40 kn (50–74 km/h) for 1,000–4,000 yd (910–3,660 m)
Whitehead Mark 9 aerial torpedo	UK	1913	Aircraft/ surface	Diameter:14 in (360 mm)			-
Yu-1	China	1971	Submarine	Diameter:533 mm (21.0 in)	400 kg (880 lb)		for 3,500 m (3,800 yd) at 93 km/h (50 kn), 9,000 km (9,800,000 yd) at 72 km/h (39 kn)
Yu-2	China	1970?	Aircraft/	Diameter:450 mm (18 in)	200 kg (440 lb)	solid-fuel rocket	74–130 km/h (40–70 kn) for 5 km (3.1 mi) in air, 1 km (0.62 mi) in water,
Yu-3	China	1984	Submarine/	Diameter:533 mm (21.0 in)	190 kg (420 lb)		65 km/h (35 kn) for 13 km (14,000 yd), Depth:350 m (1,150 ft)+
Yu-4	China	1982	Surface/	Diameter:533 mm (21.0 in)	309 kg (681 lb)	Silver–zinc battery	56–74 km/h (30–40 kn) (upgraded) for 6–15 km (3.7–9.3 mi)
Yu-5	China	1989	Submarine/	Diameter:533 mm (21.0 in)	400 kg (880 lb)	otto fuel II	93 km/h (50 kn) for 30 km (19 mi); Depth:400 m (1,300 ft)
Yu-6	China	1995	Submarine/ all	Diameter:533 mm (21.0 in)		Otto fuel II	120 km/h (65 kn)+ for 45 km (28 mi)+
Yu-7	China	1989	Helicopter/ submarine	Diameter:324 mm (12.8 in)	46 kg (101 lb)	Otto fuel II	87 km/h (47 kn) for 7,300 m (24,000 ft); Depth:400 m (1,300 ft)
Yu-8	China		/	Diameter:533 mm (21.0 in)		Silver–zinc battery	
Yu-9	China		/	Diameter:324 mm (12.8 in)			
Yu-10	China		/	Diameter:533 mm (21.0 in)			
Yu-11	China		/	Diameter:324 mm (12.8 in)			
Z13	France		Surface	Diameter:550 mm (22 in)		Electric, 2 propellers	56 km/h (30 kn) for 10 km (11,000 yd)

== See also ==
- List of lists of weapons
