= Mark 31 torpedo =

- Type: Acoustic torpedo
- Place of origin: United States

Service history
- In service: never in service

Production history
- Designer: Underwater Sound Laboratory, Harvard University; Ordnance Research Laboratory, Pennsylvania State University
- Designed: 1944
- Manufacturer: Naval Torpedo Station Newport

Specifications
- Mass: 2800 pounds
- Length: 246 inches
- Diameter: 21 inches
- Effective firing range: 4000 yards
- Warhead: Mk 31, HBX
- Warhead weight: 500 pounds
- Engine: Electric
- Maximum speed: 29 knots
- Guidance system: Gyroscope
- Launch platform: Destroyers

The Mark 31 torpedo was a destroyer-launched acoustic torpedo developed by the Harvard and Pennsylvania State universities during World War II. A modification of the Mark 18 electric torpedo, it was conceived as an interim weapon to be used in the Pacific War until a new high-speed acoustic torpedo could be developed for the United States Navy.

Further development of the torpedo was terminated due to the status of other more promising programs, notably the Mark 16 torpedo and the Mark 35 torpedo.

== See also ==
- Mark 18 torpedo
- American 21-inch torpedo
