= Mark 29 torpedo =

- Type: Acoustic torpedo
- Place of origin: United States

Service history
- In service: never in service

Production history
- Designer: Westinghouse Electric
- Designed: 1945
- Variants: Mark 29 Mod 1 torpedo

Specifications
- Mass: 3200 pounds
- Length: 246 inches
- Diameter: 21 inches
- Effective firing range: 4000–12,000 yards
- Warhead: Mk 28 Mod 2, HBX
- Warhead weight: 550 pounds
- Detonation mechanism: Mk 14 Mod 2 contact exploder
- Engine: Electric
- Maximum speed: 21–28 knots
- Guidance system: Gyroscope
- Launch platform: Submarines

The Mark 29 torpedo was a submarine-launched, acoustic torpedo designed by Westinghouse Electric in 1945 for the United States Navy. It used the same acoustic system as the Mark 28 torpedo but was faster, operated at various depths, had an external depth setter, and could run as either a straight or a homing torpedo. The Mod 1 variant had two speeds, a remote-setting variable enabler and an anti-circular run device.

In April 1945, the Mark 29 program was discontinued.

== See also ==
- American 21-inch torpedo
