= Mark 33 torpedo =

- Type: Acoustic torpedo
- Place of origin: United States

Service history
- In service: never in service

Production history
- Designer: Bureau of Ordnance; General Electric; Exide
- Designed: 1943
- No. built: 30

Specifications
- Mass: 1795 pounds
- Length: 156 inches
- Diameter: 21 inches
- Effective firing range: 5000–19,000 yards
- Warhead: HBX
- Warhead weight: 500 pounds
- Engine: Electric
- Maximum speed: 12.5-18.5 knots
- Guidance system: Gyroscope
- Launch platform: Submarines and aircraft

The Mark 33 torpedo was the first passive acoustic antisurface ship/antisubmarine homing torpedo intended for the United States Navy to employ a cast aluminum shell. It featured two speeds – high and low, and was meant to be launched from submarines and aircraft.

Production of the Mark 33 was discontinued at the end of World War II, but its features were incorporated into the Mark 35 torpedo.

== See also ==
- American 21-inch torpedo
