= Mark 20 =

Mark 20 may refer to:

- The Mark 20 nuclear bomb, a planned successor to the Mark 13 nuclear bomb, but never built
- Mark 20 torpedo, an experimental 1943 US torpedo abandoned in testing after about 20 units had been built
- Mark 20 Bidder, a British torpedo in service 1955-1980s
