= American 21-inch torpedo =

There have been a number of 21-inch torpedoes in service with the United States. These have been used on ships and submarines of the U.S. Navy. American 21-inch torpedoes are 533 millimeters in diameter.

Ship classes that carried 21-inch torpedoes include:

- Allen M. Sumner-class destroyers
- Atlanta-class cruisers
- Bagley-class destroyers
- Balao-class submarines
- Barbel-class submarines
- Barracuda-class submarines
- Benham-class destroyers
- Benjamin Franklin-class submarines
- Benson-class destroyers
- Cachalot-class submarines
- Caldwell-class destroyers
- Cassin-class destroyers
- Chester-class cruisers
- Clemson-class destroyers
- Colorado-class battleships
- Connecticut-class battleships
- Dealey-class destroyer escorts
- Ethan Allen-class submarines
- Farragut-class destroyers
- Forrest Sherman-class destroyers
- Fletcher-class destroyers
- Gato-class submarines
- Gearing-class destroyers
- George Washington-class submarines
- Gleaves-class destroyers
- Glenard P. Lipscomb-class submarine
- Grayback-class submarines
- Gridley-class destroyers
- Halibut-class submarine
- James Madison-class submarines
- John C. Butler-class destroyer escorts
- Lafayette-class submarines
- Lexington-class battlecruisers - canceled
- Los Angeles-class submarines
- Mahan-class destroyers
- Mitscher-class destroyer leaders
- Narwhal-class submarine
- Nautilus-class submarine
- Norfolk-class destroyer leader
- O'Brien-class destroyers
- Ohio-class submarines
- Omaha-class cruisers
- Permit-class submarines
- Porter-class destroyers
- PT boats
- R-class submarines
- Rudderow-class destroyer escorts
- S-class submarines
- Sailfish-class submarines
- Sampson-class destroyers
- Sargo-class submarines
- Seawolf-class submarine (1957)
- Seawolf-class submarines (1997)
- Sims-class destroyers
- Skate-class submarines
- Skipjack-class submarines
- Somers-class destroyers
- South Dakota-class battleships - canceled
- Sturgeon-class submarines
- T-1-class submarines
- Tambor-class submarines
- Tang-class submarines
- Tench-class submarines
- Tennessee-class cruisers
- Tucker-class destroyers
- Tullibee-class submarine
- V-boat submarines
- Virginia-class battleships
- Virginia-class submarines
- Wickes-class destroyers

Name	Country	In service date	Platform / target	Dimensions	Warhead	Propulsion	Performance
Mark 1 (Bliss-Leavitt)	US	1904–1922	Surface / Surface	Diameter: 21 in (53 cm); Length: 16.4 ft (5.0 m); Weight: 1,500 lb (680 kg)	200 lb (91 kg); Guncotton	Single vertical turbine wheel	Speed: 27 kn (50 km/h); Range: 4,000 yd (3.7 km)
Mark 2 (Bliss-Leavitt)	US	1905–1922	Surface / Surface	Diameter: 21 in (53 cm); Length: 16.4 ft (5.0 m); Weight: 1,500 lb (680 kg)	200 lb (91 kg); Guncotton	Turbine (contra-rotating)	Speed: 26 kn (48 km/h); Range: 3,500 yd (3.2 km)
Mark 3 (Bliss-Leavitt)	US	1906–1922	Surface / Surface	Diameter: 21 in (53 cm); Length: 16.4 ft (5.0 m); Weight: 1,500 lb (680 kg)	200 lb (91 kg); Guncotton	Turbine (contra-rotating)	Speed: 26 kn (48 km/h); Range: 4,000 yd (3.7 km)
Mark 8 (Bliss-Leavitt)	US	1911–1945	Surface / Surface	Diameter: 21 in (53 cm); Length: 21.3 ft (6.5 m); Weight: 2,600 lb (1,200 kg)	Mod 4: 466 lb (211 kg); TNT	Turbine	Speed: 36 kn (67 km/h); Range: 16,000 yd (15,000 m)
Mark 9 (Bliss-Leavitt)	US	1915–1945	Surface & submarine / Surface	Diameter: 21 in (53 cm); Length: 16.4 ft (5.0 m); Weight: 2,015 lb (914 kg)	Mk.9:210 lb (95 kg); TNT	Turbine	Speed: 27 kn (50 km/h); Range: 7,000 yd (6,400 m)
Mark 10	US	1915–1945	Submarine / Surface	Diameter: 21 in (53 cm); Length: 16.2 ft (4.9 m); Weight: 2,215 lb (1,005 kg)	Mod.3: 497 lb (225 kg); TNT	Steam turbine	Speed: 36 kn (67 km/h); Range: 3,500 yd (3,200 m)
Mark 11	US	1926–1945	Surface / Surface	Diameter: 21 in (53 cm); Length: 22.6 ft (6.9 m); Weight: 3,511 lb (1,593 kg)	Mk.11: 500 lb (230 kg); TNT	Turbine	Low: 27 kn (50 km/h); Range: 15,000 yd (14,000 m) Medium: 34 kn (63 km/h); Range: 10,000 yd (9,100 m) High: 46 kn (85 km/h); Range: 6,000 yd (5,500 m)
Mark 12	US	1928–1945	Surface / Surface	Diameter: 21 in (53 cm); Length:22.6 ft (6.9 m); Weight: 3,505 lb (1,590 kg)	Mk.11; 500 lb (230 kg); TNT	Turbine	Low: 27.5 kn (50.9 km/h); Range: 15,000 yd (14,000 m) Medium: 35.5 kn (65.7 km/h); Range: 10,000 yd (9,100 m) High: 44 kn (81 km/h); Range: 7,000 yd (6,400 m)
Mark 14	US	1938	Submarine / Surface	Diameter: 21 in (53 cm); Length: 20.5 ft (6.2 m); Weight: 3,209 lb (1,456 kg)	Mod.0: 507 lb (230 kg) TNT; Mod.6: 643 lb (292 kg) Torpex	Turbine	Mod.0: Low: 31.1 kn (57.6 km/h); Range: 9,000 yd (8,200 m) Mod.3: Low: 31.1 kn (57.6 km/h); Range: 9,000 yd (8,200 m) High: 46.3 kn (85.7 km/h); Range: 4,500 yd (4,100 m)
Mark 15	US	1938–1956	Surface / Surface	Diameter: 21 in (53 cm); Length: 24 ft (7.3 m); Weight: 3,841 lb (1,742 kg)	Mod 0: 494 lb (224 kg) TNT Mod.3: 801 lb (363 kg) TNT or 825 lb (374 kg) HBX	Turbine	Mod.0: Low: 26.5 kn (49.1 km/h); Range: 15,000 yd (14,000 m) Medium: 33.5 kn (62.0 km/h); Range: 10,000 yd (9,100 m) High: 45 kn (83 km/h); Range: 6,000 yd (5,500 m) Mod.3: Low: 26.5 kn (49.1 km/h); Range :14,000 yd (13,000 m) Medium: 33.5 kn (62.0 km/h); Range: 9,000 yd (8,200 m) High: 45 kn (83 km/h); Range: 4,500 yd (4,100 m)
Mark 16	US	1943–1975	Submarine / Surface	Diameter: 21 in (53 cm); Length: 20.5 ft (6.2 m); Weight: 3,895 lb (1,767 kg); Mod.1: 3,922 lb (1,779 kg); Mod.3: 4,000 lb (1,800 kg); Mod.8: 4,155 lb (1,885 kg)	Mk.16 Mod.7 Mod.0: 1,260 lb (570 kg) Torpex Mod.1 and 3: 746 lb (338 kg) Torpex or HBX (later used HBX-3) 960 lb (440 kg) Torpex (later used HBX) Mod.8: 1,260 lb (570 kg) HBX	Turbine	Mod.0: Speed: 46.2–51.6 kn (85.6–95.6 km/h); Range: 7,000 yd (6,400 m) Mod.1: Range: 11,000–12,500 yd (10,100–11,400 m) Mod.3: Range: 13,700 yd (12,500 m); Mod.8: same range as Mod.1 or Mod.3
Mark 17	US	1944–1950	Surface / Surface	Diameter: 21 in (53 cm); Length: 24 ft (7.3 m); Weight: 4,600 lb (2,100 kg)	Mod.3: 879.5 lb (398.9 kg); HBX	Turbine	Speed: 46.5 kn (86.1 km/h); Range :18,000 yd (16,000 m)
Mark 18	US	1943–1950	Submarine / Surface	Diameter: 21 in (53 cm); Length:20.4 ft (6.2 m); Weight: 3,154 lb (1,431 kg)	Mod.3 :575 lb (261 kg) HBX	Electric	Speed: 29 kn (54 km/h); Range:4,000 yd (3,700 m)
Mark 19	US		Submarine / Surface	Diameter: 21 in (53 cm); Length: 20.5 ft (6.2 m); Weight: 3,240 lb (1,470 kg)	Mk.20; 800 lb (360 kg); Torpex	Electric, secondary battery	Speed: 29 kn (54 km/h); Range: 4,000 yd (3,700 m)
Mark 20	US		Submarine / Surface	Diameter: 21 in (53 cm); Length: 20.5 ft (6.2 m); Weight: 3,100 lb (1,400 kg)	Mk.20; 500 lb (230 kg); TNT	Electric motor	Speed: 33 kn (61 km/h); Range: 3,500 yd (3.2 km)
Mark 22	US		Submarine / Surface	Diameter: 21 in (53 cm); Length: 20.5 ft (6.2 m); Weight: 3,060 lb (1,390 kg)	500 lb (230 kg) HBX	Electric	Speed :29 kn (54 km/h); Range :4,000 yd (3.7 km)
Mark 23	US	1943–1946	Submarine / Surface	Diameter: 21 in (53 cm); Length: 20.5 ft (6.2 m); Weight: 3,259 lb (1,478 kg)	Mod.6: 643 lb (292 kg) HBX	Turbine	Speed: 46.3 kn (85.7 km/h); Range : 4,500 yd (4.1 km)
Mark 26	US		Submarine / Surface	Diameter:21 in (53 cm); Length: 20.5 ft (6.2 m); Weight: 3,200 lb (1,500 kg)	Mk.26: 410–450 kg (900–1,000 lb) HBX	Electric, seawater battery	Speed: 40 kn (74 km/h); Range: 6,000 yd (5.5 km)
Mark 28	US	1944–1960	Submarine / Surface	Diameter: 21 in (53 cm); Length: 20.5 ft (6.2 m); Weight: 2,800 lb (1,300 kg)	Mod.2: 585 lb (265 kg); HBX	Electric	Speed: 19.6 kn (36.3 km/h); Range: 4,000 yd (3.7 km)
Mark 29	US		Submarine / Surface	Diameter: 21 in (53 cm); Length: 20.5 ft (6.2 m); Weight: 3,200 lb (1,500 kg)	Mod.2: 550 lb (250 kg) HBX	Electric	Low: 21 kn (39 km/h); Range: 12,000 yd (11,000 m) High: 28 kn (52 km/h); Range:4,000 yd (3,700 m)
Mark 31	US		Surface / Surface	Diameter: 21 in (53 cm); Length: 20.5 ft (6.2 m); Weight: 2,800 lb (1,300 kg)	Mk.31:500 lb (230 kg); HBX	Electric	Speed: 29 kn (54 km/h); Range: 4,000 yd (3.7 km)
Mark 33 Mod 0	US		Submarine & Aircraft / Submarine & surface	Diameter: 21 in (53 cm); Length: 6.9 ft (2.1 m); Weight: 1,795 lb (814 kg)	550 lb (250 kg); HBX	Electric	Low: 12.5 kn (23.2 km/h); Range: 19,000 yd (17,000 m) High: 18.5 kn (34.3 km/h); Range: 5,000 yd (4,600 m)
Mark 35	US	1949–1960	Surface / Surface	Diameter: 21 in (53 cm); Length: 6.9 ft (2.1 m); Weight: 1,770 lb (800 kg)	Mod.2 or 3: 270 lb (120 kg); HBX	Electric, primary seawater battery	Speed: 27 kn (50 km/h); Range: 15,000 yd (14 km)
Mark 36 Mod 0	US	1949–1960	Surface / Surface	Diameter: 21 in (53 cm); Length: 20.5 ft (6.2 m); Weight: 4,000 lb (1,800 kg)	Mk.36: 800 lb (360 kg); HBX-1	Electric	Speed: 47 kn (87 km/h); Range: 7,000 yd (6.4 km)
Mark 41 Mod 0	US	1950–1959	Aircraft / Submarine	Diameter: 21 in (53 cm); Length: 10 ft (3.0 m); Weight: 1,327 lb (602 kg)	Mk.41; 150 lb (68 kg); HBX	Electric, seawater battery	Speed: 25 kn (46 km/h); Range:8,000 yd (7.3 km)
Mark 45 Mod 0	US	1963–1976	Submarine / Submarine & surface	Diameter: 21 in (53 cm); Length: 18.9 ft (5.8 m); Weight: 2,400 lb (1,100 kg)	11 kiloton W34 nuclear warhead	Electric	Speed: 40 kn (74 km/h); Range: 15,000 yd (14 km)
Mark 45 Mod 1	US	1976-?	Submarine / Submarine & surface	Diameter: 21 in (53 cm); Length: 18.9 ft (5.8 m); Weight:2,400 lb (1,100 kg)	conventional	Electric	Speed: 40 kn (74 km/h); Range: 15,000 yd (14 km)
Mark 48	US	1972–present	Submarine / Submarine & surface	Diameter: 21 in (53 cm)	650 lbs	Piston engine, pump jet	

== See also ==
- American 18-inch torpedo

== Bibliography ==
- Campbell, John (1985). Naval Weapons of World War II. Naval Institute Press. ISBN 0-87021-459-4.
- Friedman, Norman (2011). Naval Weapons of World War One: Guns, Torpedoes, Mines and ASW Weapons of All Nations; An Illustrated Directory. Seaforth Publishing. ISBN 978-1-84832-100-7.
