= Mark 19 torpedo =

- Type: Anti-surface ship torpedo
- Place of origin: United States

Service history
- In service: never in service

Production history
- Designer: Westinghouse Electric
- Designed: 1942
- No. built: 10 prototypes

Specifications
- Mass: 3240 pounds
- Length: 246 inches
- Diameter: 21 inches
- Effective firing range: 4000 yards
- Warhead: Mk 20, Torpex
- Warhead weight: 800 pounds
- Detonation mechanism: Mk 7 contact/magnetic influence exploder
- Engine: Electric
- Maximum speed: 29 knots
- Guidance system: Gyroscope
- Launch platform: Submarines

The Mark 19 torpedo was an electric torpedo designed in 1942 by Westinghouse Electric as a follow-on development of the Mark 18 torpedo.

== History ==
The goal was to build a torpedo that incorporated all-electric controls in place of pneumatic controls. Its gyroscope and depth control were electrically controlled and operated, while the rudders were solenoid operated.

Further development of the Mark 19 was cancelled in favor of the Mark 26 torpedo.

== See also ==
- American 21-inch torpedo
