= Mark 37 torpedo =

American acoustic torpedo

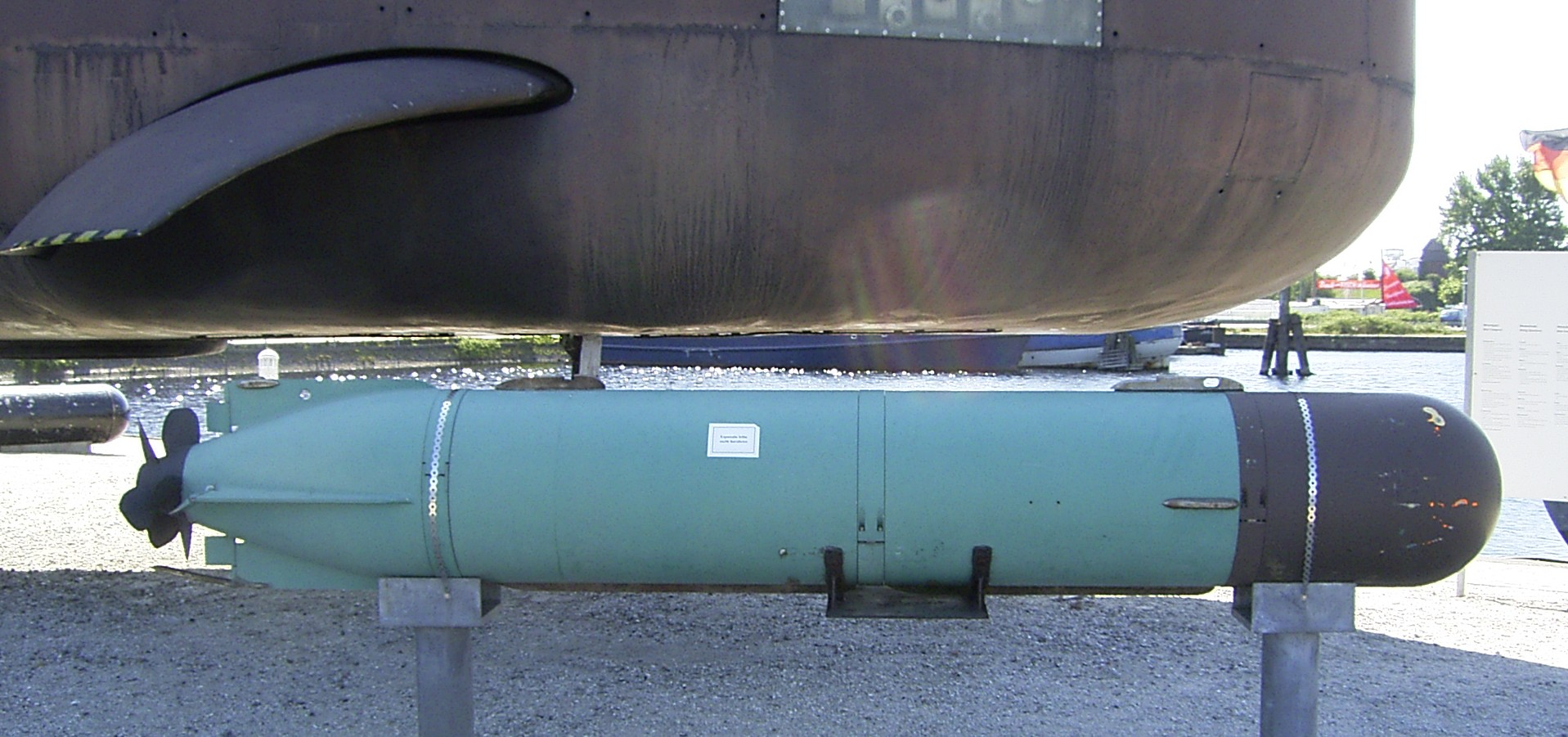
- Mark 37 torpedo at the German Marine Museum Wilhelmshaven
- Type: Acoustic torpedo
- Place of origin: United States

Service history
- In service: 1956-1972
- Used by: United States Navy; Israeli Navy; Royal Netherlands Navy

Production history
- Designer: Westinghouse Electric; Underwater Sound Laboratory, Harvard University; Ordnance Research Laboratory, Pennsylvania State University
- Designed: 1946
- Manufacturer: Naval Ordnance Station Forest Park
- Variants: Mark 37 Mod 1 Mark 37 Mod 2 Mark 37 Mod 3 NT37C; NT37D; NT37E; NT37F

Specifications
- Mass: 1,430 pounds (650 kg)
- Length: 135 inches (3.4 m)
- Diameter: 19 inches (480 mm) (21-inch guide rails)
- Effective firing range: 23,000 yards (21 km) at 17 knots, 10,000 yards (9.1 km) at 26 knots
- Warhead: Mk 37 Mod 0, HBX-3
- Warhead weight: 330 pounds
- Detonation mechanism: Mk 19 contact exploder
- Engine: Electric
- Maximum speed: 17 knots (31 km/h), 26 knots (48 km/h)
- Guidance system: Gyroscope (initial), passive sonar (cruise) and Doppler active sonar homing (terminal)
- Launch platform: Submarines

The Mark 37 torpedo is a torpedo with electrical propulsion, developed for the US Navy after World War II. It entered service with the US Navy in the early 1950s, with over 3,300 produced. It was phased out of service with the US Navy during the 1970s, and the stockpiles were sold to foreign navies.

== Development ==
Its engineering development began in 1946 by Westinghouse. It was largely based on the concept of the passive homing Mark 27, with added active homing system tested on modified Mark 18s, and a new torpedo body. Between 1955 and 1956, thirty torpedoes were produced for development testing, with large-scale production commenced shortly afterwards.

Due to its electric propulsion, the torpedo swam smoothly out of the launch tube, instead of having to be ejected by pressurized air, therefore significantly reducing its acoustic launch signature. To allow for water flow around the torpedo while swimming out, several one-inch (25 mm)-thick guide studs were attached to the torpedo, which although 19 inches (480 mm) in diameter was designed to be used only from 21-inch (533 mm) torpedo tubes.

The guidance of a Mk37 mod 0 torpedo was done by a gyroscope control during the initial part of its trajectory, where the gyro control achieved a straight run, a passive sonar homing system, and at the last 700 yards (640 m) by a Doppler-enabled active sonar homing, with magnetostrictive transducers operating at 60 kHz. The electronics was based on miniature vacuum tubes, later on solid-state semiconductor devices.

== Modifications ==
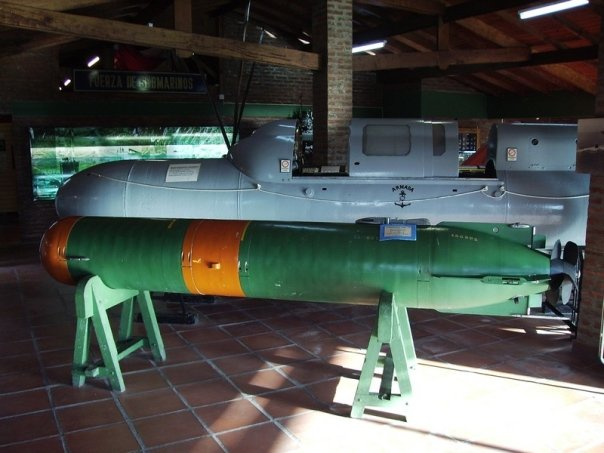
A Mark 37 Mod 1 torpedo at The Submarine Force Museum, Argentina.

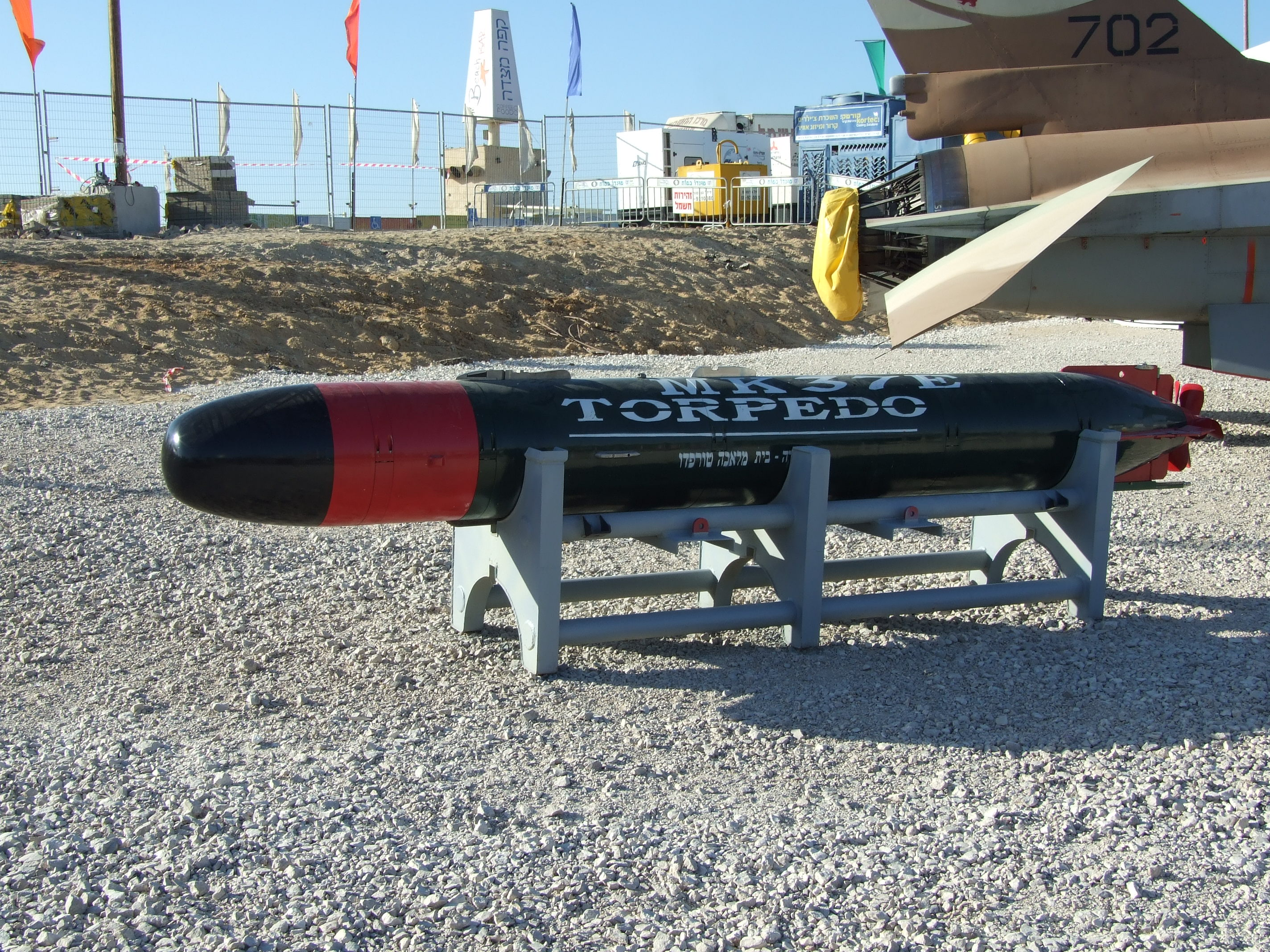
Israeli Mark 37E torpedo

The mod 1 torpedoes were longer, slower and heavier than mod 0, but offered better target acquisition capabilities and higher ability to intercept agile submarines. They used wire-guidance.

In 1967, the mod 0s started being refurbished as mod 3, and mod 1 as mod 2. These modifications involved many changes including replacement of magnetostrictive transducers with piezoelectric ones, and resulted in target acquisition range increased from 700 yd (640 m) to 1,000 yd (910 m) without loss of sensitivity with increasing depth.

The torpedoes used Mark 46 silver oxide batteries. These had a known tendency to overheat, occasionally igniting or exploding. Training torpedoes used rechargeable secondary batteries.

The efficiency of Mk 37 torpedoes was high for targets with speed lower than 20 knots (37 km/h; 23 mph) and depth less than 1,000 ft (300 m). As submarines with higher speeds and operating depths appeared, new torpedoes were developed. Of them, the export models NT37C, D, E, and F are based on the Mk37 design.

For a long time, the Mark 37 was a primary U.S. submarine-launched ASW torpedo. It was replaced by the Mark 48 starting in 1972. The remaining inventory was then rebuilt and sold to several countries, including Israel, as the NT-37C after the vacuum tube guidance systems were replaced by solid-state electronics and the electric propulsion was replaced with a liquid monopropellant.

== Other uses ==
The Mk 67 submarine launched mobile mine is based on a Mark 37 torpedo body. It entered service in 1983 and is capable of swimming as far as 10 miles through or into a channel, harbor, shallow water area and other zones which would normally be inaccessible to the vessel laying it. After reaching the target area it sinks to the sea bed and acts like a conventionally laid influence mine. The exploder in the Mk 67 warhead is computerised and incorporates magnetic, acoustic and pressure sensors.

== General characteristics ==
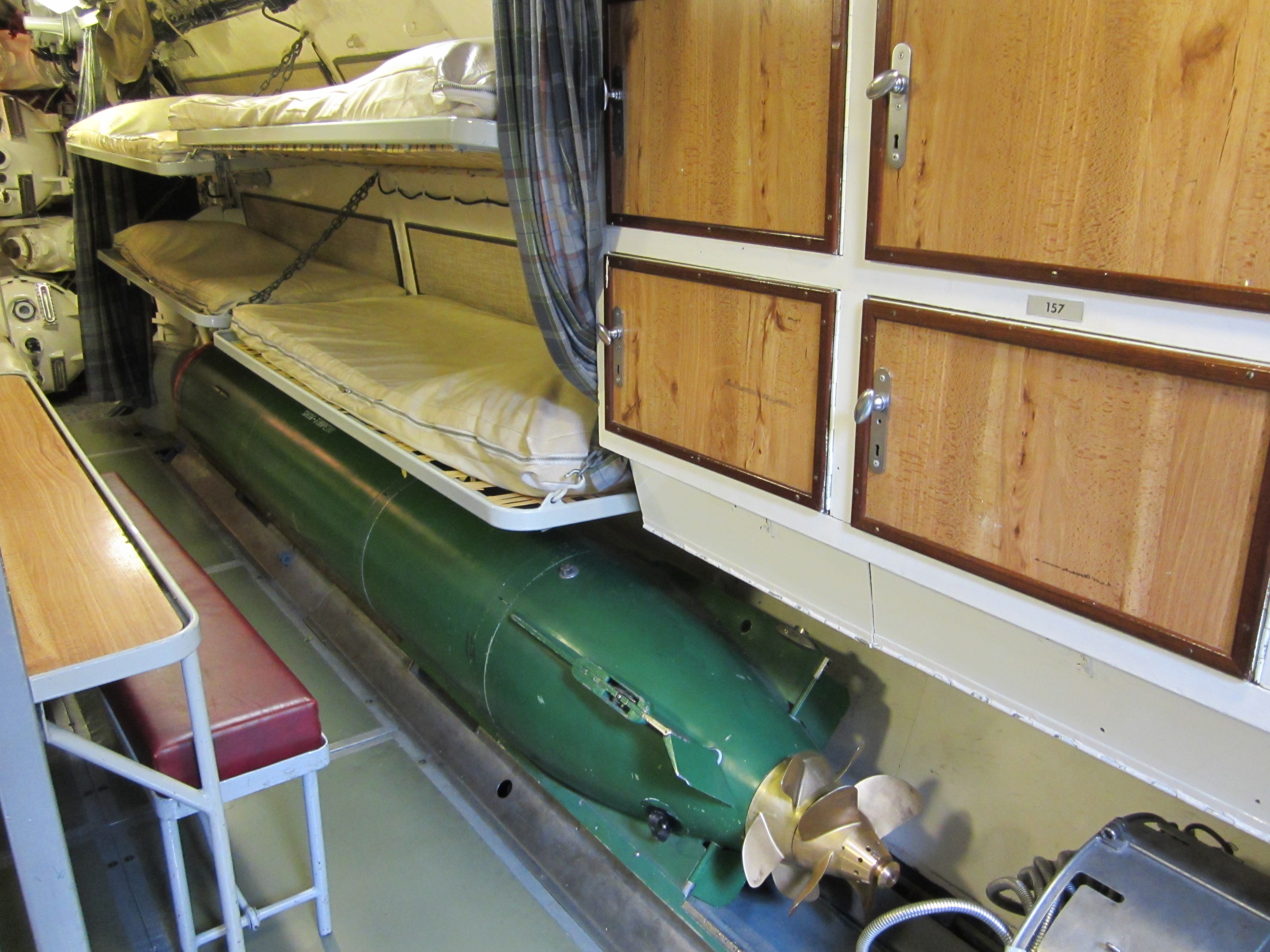
A Mark 37 exhibit in HNLMS Tonijn, at the Dutch Navy Museum.

- Power plant: Mark 46 silver-zinc battery, two-speed electric motor
- Length: 135 inches (340 cm) (mod.0), 161 inches (410 cm) (mod.1)
- Weight: 1,430 pounds (650 kg) (mod.0), 1,660 pounds (750 kg) (mod.1)
- Diameter: 19 inches (48 cm)
- Range: 23,000 yards (21 km) at 17 knots, 10,000 yards (9.1 km) at 26 knots
- Depth: 1,000 feet (300 m)
- Speed: 17 knots (31 km/h), 26 knots (48 km/h)
- Guidance system: active/passive sonar homing; passive until about 700 yards (640 m) from target, then active; mod.1 with wire-guidance
- Warhead: 330 pounds (150 kg) HBX-3 high explosive with contact exploder
- Date deployed: 1957
