= Mark 24 mine =

Mark 24
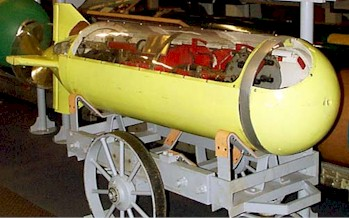
- Mark 24 acoustic torpedo
- Type: Acoustic torpedo
- Place of origin: United States, Canada, United Kingdom

Service history
- In service: 1942–1948
- Used by: United States Navy; Royal Navy; Fleet Air Arm; Royal Canadian Navy
- Wars: World War II

Production history
- Designer: Western Electric Company; Bell Telephone Laboratories; Harvard University Underwater Sound Laboratory
- Designed: 1942
- Manufacturer: General Electric Company; Western Electric Company
- No. built: 4000

Specifications
- Mass: 680 pounds (310 kg)
- Length: 84 inches (2.1 m)
- Diameter: 19 inches (48 cm)
- Effective firing range: 4,000 yards (3.7 km) (10 minutes search duration)
- Warhead: HBX
- Warhead weight: 92 pounds (42 kg)
- Detonation mechanism: Mk 142 fuze, contact exploder
- Engine: Electric, secondary battery
- Maximum speed: 12 knots (22 km/h)
- Guidance system: preset circle search, passive acoustic
- Launch platform: Aircraft

The Mark 24 mine (also known as FIDO or Fido) is an air-dropped anti-submarine (ASW) acoustic torpedo developed by the United States during World War II; it was called a mine to conceal its capabilities. The torpedo entered service with the Allies in March 1943 and was used by the United States Navy (USN) until 1948. Approximately 4,000 were produced. Of the 340 deployed during the war, 204 were fired, sinking 37 and damaging 18 Axis submarines.

== Background ==
The concept of the acoustic torpedo existed by World War I, but was impractical due to the insufficient understanding of underwater acoustics. Germany was developing electrically-driven acoustic torpedoes by 1933; the resulting G7e and G7es anti-ship torpedoes, running at a preset depth, entered service on submarines in 1943. The USN received a similar anti-ship torpedo, the Mark 28, in 1944.

ASW torpedoes must detect and respond to greater changes in depth and azimuth than anti-ship torpedoes. FIDO was designed within the additional constraint of being air-dropped.

== Development ==
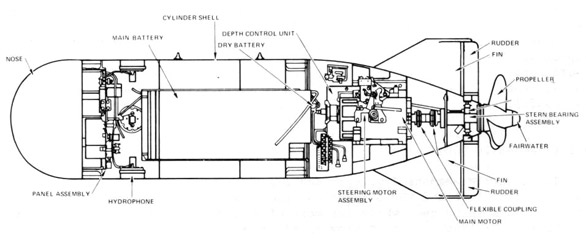
Mark 24 mine diagram

USN studies for Fido began in late-1941. Requirements for program NO-94, changed to Project 61 were issued to Bell Telephone Labs (BTL) and Harvard Underwater Sound Lab (HUSL), General Electric Company (GE), and the Columbia University Special Studies Group (CUSSG) with development beginning in December by four teams. The project became the Office of Scientific Research and Development's Project 61, codenamed "FIDO".

Bell and HUSL worked in parallel with complete information sharing. Western Electric was to develop a lightweight, shock resistant, 48 volt lead-acid battery capable of providing 110 amps for 15 minutes. General Electric was to design and fabricate propulsion and steering motors and to investigate an active acoustic homing system. David Taylor Model Basin was to assist with hydrodynamics and propulsion.

The guidance system used four hydrophones on the torpedo's midsection, connected to a vacuum tube-based sound processing array. A Bell proportional navigation and HUSL non-proportional steering system were demonstrated by July 1942.

The body was a modification of the Mark 13 torpedo. Length, diameter, and weight were reduced. The nose section was hemispherical for the explosive charge. The conical tail section had four stabilizing fins, and rudders and a single propeller. Fido was relatively short and "fat".

In June 1942, the USN decided to start production even though major testing remained to be done, including air-drop testing. Bell's proportional homing guidance system was selected. Testing of the pre-production prototypes continued into December 1942, and the USN received the first production models in March 1943.

The initial order of 10,000 FIDOs was later reduced to 4,000 due to the torpedo's excellent performance. Each cost $1,800.

== Description ==
Upon water entry, FIDO performed a circular search at a predetermined depth controlled by a bellows and pendulum system. The passive acoustic proportional homing system took over once the target's 24 kHz acoustic signal from the hydrophones exceeded a predetermined threshold. Initially the torpedoes were set to search for targets at depths of 50 feet (15 m), this was later changed to 150 feet (45 m). The circular search resumed above depths of 40 feet (12 m) to prevent attacks on surface ships.

FIDO's relatively low speed was kept secret. It could outrun submerged, but not surfaced, U-boats.

== Combat history ==
Two engagements in May 1943 have a claim for the first U-boat sunk by FIDO. On 14 May, a USN Catalina sank U-657 or U-640. On 13 May, RAF Coastal Command Liberator B/86 damaged U-456; the submarine sinking the following day. In all, FIDO sank 37 submarines for an effectiveness of about 18%, compared with 9.5% for aircraft-launched depth charges.

US Navy OEG Study No. 289, 12 August 1946 provides the following data related to the Mark 24's effectiveness:

Number of attacks in which Mark 24s were launched	264
Total number of Mark 24 torpedoes launched - all targets	340
Number of Mark 24s launched against submarines	204
Number of Mark 24 attacks on submarines by US aircraft	142
Number of Mark 24 attacks by Allied (primarily British) aircraft	62
Number of German U-boats sunk by FIDO	31
Number of German U-boats damaged by FIDO	15
Number of Japanese submarines sunk by FIDO	6
Number of Japanese submarines damaged by FIDO	3
Total number of submarines sunk by FIDO (German & Japanese)	37
Total number of submarines damaged	18

== General characteristics ==
- Diameter: 19 inches (48 cm).
- Length: 84 inches (2.13 m).
- Weight: 680 lb (308 kg).
- Warhead: 92 lb (41.7 kg) HBX high explosive.
- Propulsion: 7.5 hp (5.57 kW) off-the-shelf General Electric Washing Machine electric motor driving a single propeller, powered by a 48 volt lead acid battery.
- Speed and endurance: 12 knots (22 km/h) for 10 minutes, giving a range of about 4,000 yards (3,700 m)
- Homing system: 4 piezoelectric hydrophones operating at 24 kHz and vacuum tube signal processing system with proportional steering.
- Maximum drop altitude: 200 to 300 ft (60 m to 90 m)
- Maximum aircraft launch speed: 120 knots (220 km/h).

== Variants ==
- The Mark 27 torpedo (Cutie) was developed for submarine use against surface vessels. It saw service in the Pacific war from the summer of 1944. Lieutenant Commander Carter L. Bennett's Sea Owl achieved the Mark 27's first combat success, damaging a Japanese patrol vessel in the Yellow Sea in November.
