= Mark 30 torpedo mine =

Mark 30 mine
- Type: Antisubmarine acoustic torpedo
- Place of origin: United States

Service history
- In service: never in service

Production history
- Designer: Brush Development Company
- Designed: 1942-1943
- No. built: 3 prototypes

Specifications
- Mass: 265 pounds
- Length: 96 inches
- Diameter: 10 inches
- Effective firing range: 3000 yards
- Warhead: Mk 30
- Warhead weight: 50 pounds
- Engine: Electric
- Maximum speed: 12 knots
- Guidance system: Gyroscope
- Launch platform: Aircraft

The Mark 30 mine was an aircraft-launched, antisubmarine torpedo developed by the Brush Development Company during World War II. It was developed as a backup for the Mark 24 mine due to apprehensions regarding the Mark 24's acoustic steering. Three prototypes of the Mark 30 were built and tested in 1943; results were satisfactory. Production of the Mark 30 was never undertaken due to the success of the Mark 24 mine's acoustic steering.

== See also ==
- Mark 24 mine
- Mark 30 torpedo
