= Mark 17 torpedo =

- Type: Anti-surface ship torpedo
- Place of origin: United States

Service history
- In service: 1944–1950
- Used by: United States Navy

Production history
- Designer: Naval Torpedo Station Newport; Naval Research Laboratory
- Designed: 1940
- Manufacturer: Naval Torpedo Station Newport
- No. built: 450

Specifications
- Mass: 4600 pounds
- Length: 288 inches
- Diameter: 21 inches
- Effective firing range: 18,000 yards
- Warhead: Mk 17 Mod 3, HBX
- Warhead weight: 879.5 pounds
- Detonation mechanism: Mk 6 Mod 1 contact exploder
- Engine: Turbine
- Propellant: "Navol", concentrated hydrogen peroxide
- Maximum speed: 46 knots
- Guidance system: Gyroscope
- Launch platform: Destroyers

The Mark 17 torpedo was a long-range, high-speed torpedo developed by the Naval Torpedo Station in Newport, Rhode Island and the Naval Research Laboratory in 1940. Development efforts on the Mark 17 were halted in 1941 in favor of producing Mark 13 and Mark 15 torpedoes during World War II. However, detailed knowledge of the Japanese Type 93 "Long Lance" oxygen torpedo became available around 1944 which led to the resumption of the development of the Mark 17. Although 450 units were manufactured before the war was over, none of these were used in combat. The use of this torpedo was discontinued in 1950 due to various reasons including the Mark 17's contribution to destroyer topside weights problems, similarity to the Mark 16, and the declining utility of unguided torpedoes in the Cold War era.

== See also ==
- American 21-inch torpedo
