= Mark 16 torpedo =

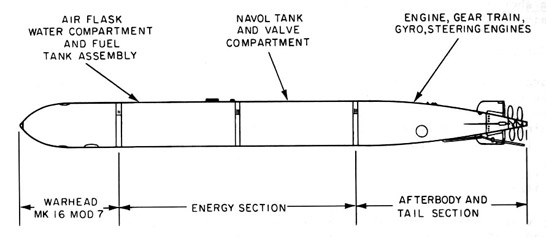
- Mark 16 torpedo
- Type: Anti-surface ship torpedo
- Place of origin: United States

Service history
- In service: 1943–1975
- Used by: United States Navy
- Wars: World War II

Production history
- Designer: Naval Torpedo Station; Naval Research Laboratory
- Designed: 1943
- Manufacturer: Naval Torpedo Station; Naval Ordnance Station Forest Park
- Produced: 1943 – post-World War II
- No. built: > 1,700

Specifications
- Mass: 3,895 pounds (1,770 kg) mod 0; 3,922 pounds (1,780 kg) mod 1; 4,155 pounds (1,880 kg) mod 8
- Length: 246 inches (6.2 m)
- Diameter: 21 inches (533 mm)
- Effective firing range: 7,000 yards (6,400 m) Mod 0; 11,000 yards (10,060 m) to 12,500 yards (11,430 m) Mod 1-8
- Warhead: Mk 16, Mod 0/1, TPX; Mk 16 Mod 7/8, HBX
- Warhead weight: 1,260 pounds (570 kg) on Mod 0 and 8 746 pounds (338 kg) on Mod 1
- Detonation mechanism: Mk 9 Mod 4 contact/influence exploder
- Engine: Turbine
- Propellant: "Navol", concentrated hydrogen peroxide
- Maximum speed: 46.2 knots (85.6 km/h; 53.2 mph)
- Guidance system: Gyroscope
- Launch platform: Submarines

The Mark 16 torpedo was a redesign of the United States Navy's standard Mark 14 torpedo in use during World War II. It incorporated war-tested improvements into a weapon designed to be used in unmodified United States fleet submarines. Due to high unit cost and the Mark 14's unreliability issues being solved by mid-1943, they were never put into mass production.

Following WWII, limited numbers of the weapon were produced. The weapon was considered the United States' standard anti-shipping torpedo for twenty years; despite significant numbers of Mark 14 torpedoes left over from wartime production. This hydrogen peroxide propelled, 21-inch (53 cm) torpedo was 20 feet 6 inches (6.25 m) long and weighed 2.0 short tons (1,800 kg).

The Mod 0 warhead contained 1,260 pounds (570 kg) of Torpex (TPX) explosive and at the time was the most powerful conventional submarine torpedo warhead in the world. The TPX explosive in use by the US Navy during WWII was about 75% more powerful by weight (7,405 J/g) than the Japanese Type 95 and Type 97 torpedo explosives (4,370 J/g). As a result, it was even more powerful than the late war "Mod.3" variant of the Type 93 "Long Lance" torpedo; which used 780 kg of the Type 97 explosive, despite the warhead weighing 210 kg (28%) less.

The Mod 1 Variant of the Mk 16 only contained 960 pounds (440 kg) of TPX explosive but could run around 4,500 yards longer as a result. The torpedo could be set for both straight or patterned running. After World War II, the Mod 0 and Mod 1 variants were developed into a common torpedo. Designed to keep the longer range from Mod 1 and larger warhead of Mod 0, this upgrade was called the Mark 16 Mod 8 and incorporated a 1,260 pound HBX (7,552 J/g) warhead in the place of the TPX. This weapon was used as the US Navy's main anti-ship torpedo until it was phased out in 1972, at which point both the Mark 16 and Mark 37 ASW torpedoes had been fully replaced by the dual-purpose Mark 48 in 1975.

== See also ==
- American 21-inch torpedo
