= Mark 26 torpedo =

Anti-surface ship torpedo

- Type: Anti-surface ship torpedo
- Place of origin: United States

Service history
- In service: never in service

Production history
- Designer: Westinghouse Electric
- Designed: 1944
- No. built: 25

Specifications
- Mass: 3200 pounds
- Length: 246 inches
- Diameter: 21 inches
- Effective firing range: 6000 yards
- Warhead: Mk 26
- Warhead weight: 900–1000 pounds
- Engine: Electric
- Maximum speed: 40 knots
- Guidance system: Gyroscope
- Launch platform: Submarines

The Mark 26 torpedo was a submarine-launched anti-surface ship torpedo designed by Westinghouse Electric in 1944 as an improved version of the Mark 28 torpedo.

The Mark 26 was first to use Bell Telephone Laboratories' seawater battery, an explosive impulse start gyro and an electric steering and depth control. Production of the Mark 26 was deferred in favor of the Mark 16 torpedo.

== See also ==
- American 21-inch torpedo
