= Mark 36 torpedo =

- Type: anti-surface ship torpedo
- Place of origin: United States

Service history
- In service: never in service

Production history
- Designer: General Electric; Naval Torpedo Station Newport
- Designed: 1946

Specifications
- Mass: 4000 pounds
- Length: 246 inches
- Diameter: 21 inches
- Effective firing range: 7000 yards
- Warhead: Mark 36, HBX-1
- Warhead weight: 800 pounds
- Engine: Electric
- Maximum speed: 47 knots
- Guidance system: Gyroscope
- Launch platform: Submarines

The Mark 36 torpedo was a submarine-launched Anti-surface ship torpedo designed by General Electric and the Naval Torpedo Station in 1946. Further development of the Mark 36 was discontinued due to the development of the Mark 42 torpedo.

== See also ==
- American 21-inch torpedo
