= Mark 28 torpedo =

- Type: Acoustic torpedo
- Place of origin: United States

Service history
- In service: 1944–1960
- Used by: United States Navy
- Wars: World War II

Production history
- Designer: Westinghouse Electric
- Designed: 1944
- Manufacturer: Westinghouse Electric
- Produced: 1944–1952
- No. built: 1750

Specifications
- Mass: 2800 pounds
- Length: 246 inches
- Diameter: 21 inches
- Effective firing range: 4000 yards (6 minutes search duration)
- Warhead: Mk 28 Mod 2, HBX
- Warhead weight: 585 pounds
- Detonation mechanism: Mk 14 Mod 2 contact exploder
- Engine: Electric
- Maximum speed: 19.6 knots
- Guidance system: Gyroscope
- Launch platform: Submarines

The Mark 28 torpedo was a submarine-launched, acoustic homing torpedo designed by Westinghouse Electric in 1944 for the United States Navy. The torpedo used all-electric controls. Service use of the Mark 28 ended after the introduction of the Mark 37 torpedo.

== See also ==
- American 21-inch torpedo
