= Mark 20 torpedo =

- Type: Anti-surface ship torpedo
- Place of origin: United States

Service history
- In service: never in service

Production history
- Designer: Naval Torpedo Station Newport; Electric Storage Battery Company; General Electric
- Designed: 1943
- Manufacturer: General Electric
- No. built: 20

Specifications
- Mass: approx. 3100 pounds
- Length: 246 inches
- Diameter: 21 inches
- Effective firing range: 3500 yards
- Warhead: Mk 20, TNT
- Warhead weight: 500 pounds
- Detonation mechanism: none assigned
- Engine: Electric
- Maximum speed: 33 knots
- Guidance system: Gyroscope
- Launch platform: Submarines

The Mark 20 torpedo was a US torpedo designed in 1943 but never used in service.

Design was by Naval Torpedo Station Newport, the Electric Storage Battery Company and General Electric. This project was a continuation of the development of a submarine-launched, anti-surface ship torpedo originally designated Mark 2 in 1941 which was the second attempt to develop a torpedo of this type. The earlier effort, designated Mark 1, in post-World War I years (1919–1931), was terminated after the torpedo produced proved unsatisfactory in speed and range.

The Mark 20 never progressed beyond the development stage due to the success of the Mark 18 torpedo, however, 20 units were produced by General Electric for testing purposes.

== See also ==
- American 21-inch torpedo
