= Exide =

American manufacturer of lead-acid batteries

Exide Holdings, Inc.

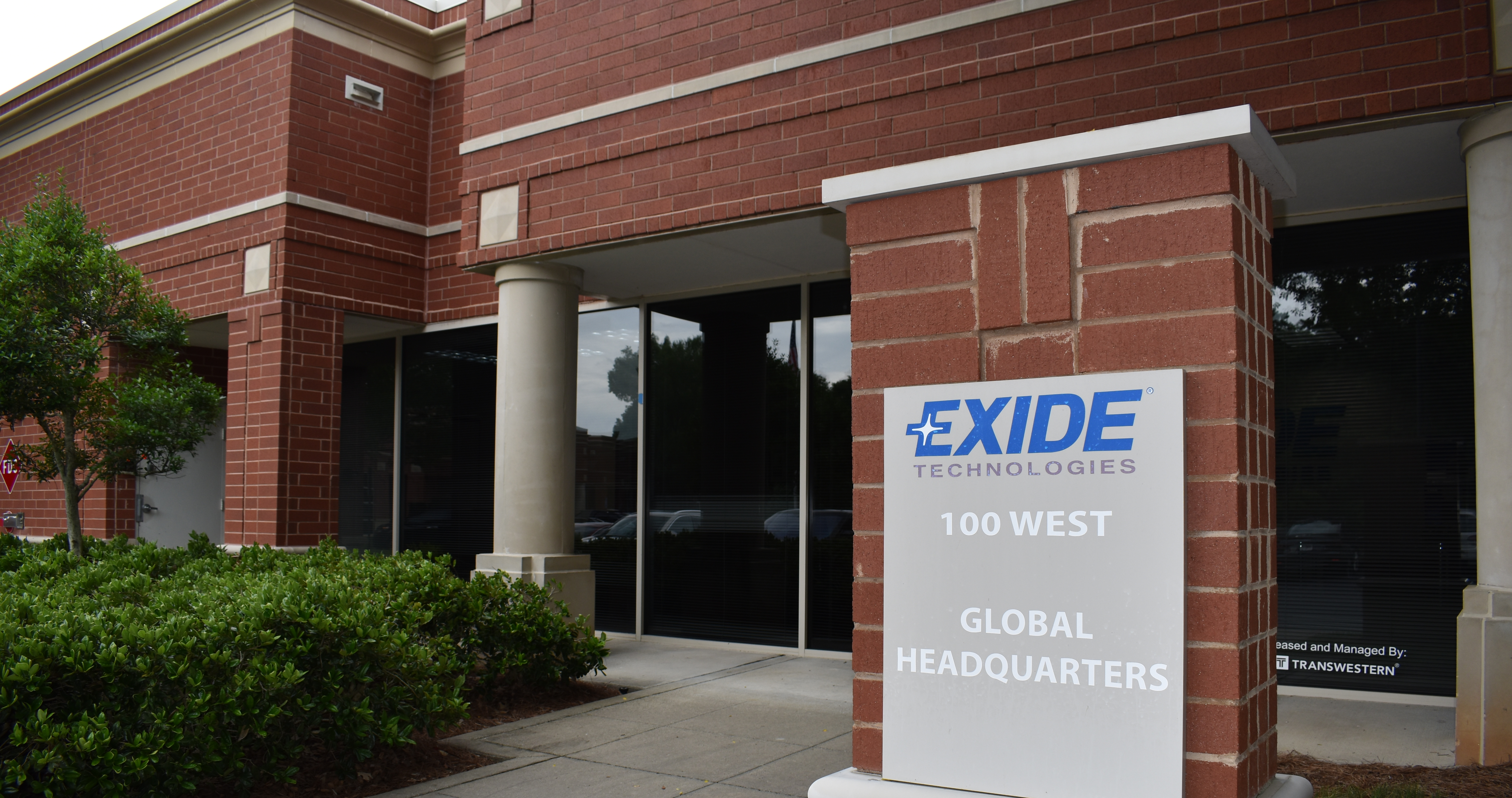
- Trade name: Exide Technologies
- Founded: 1888; 138 years ago
- Founder: W.W. Gibbs
- Fate: Chapter 11 bankruptcy
- Successors: Continental Battery Systems (US Exide-branded battery distribution); Stryten Energy (battery manufacturing); Element Resources (battery recycling); Exide Technologies (HQ in Gennevilliers, France, has the non-USA, non-Canadian, and non-Indian businesses)
- Headquarters: Milton, Georgia, U.S.
- Products: Batteries
- Website: www.exide.com

Exide was originally a brand name for batteries produced by The Electric Storage Battery Company and later became Exide Holdings, Inc. doing business as Exide Technologies, an American lead-acid batteries manufacturing company. Exide Holdings manufactured automotive batteries and industrial batteries. Exide Holdings is based in Milton, Georgia, United States.

Exide Holdings had both manufacturing and recycling plants. The former were located throughout the U.S., Pacific Rim, Europe and Australia. Recycling plants are located in Canon Hollow, which is north of Forest City, Missouri, and Muncie, Indiana. Two recycling plants in Frisco, Texas and Vernon, California have been closed in 2012 and 2013. The plants in Reading, Pennsylvania and Baton Rouge, Louisiana have also been closed.

== History ==
=== 19th century ===
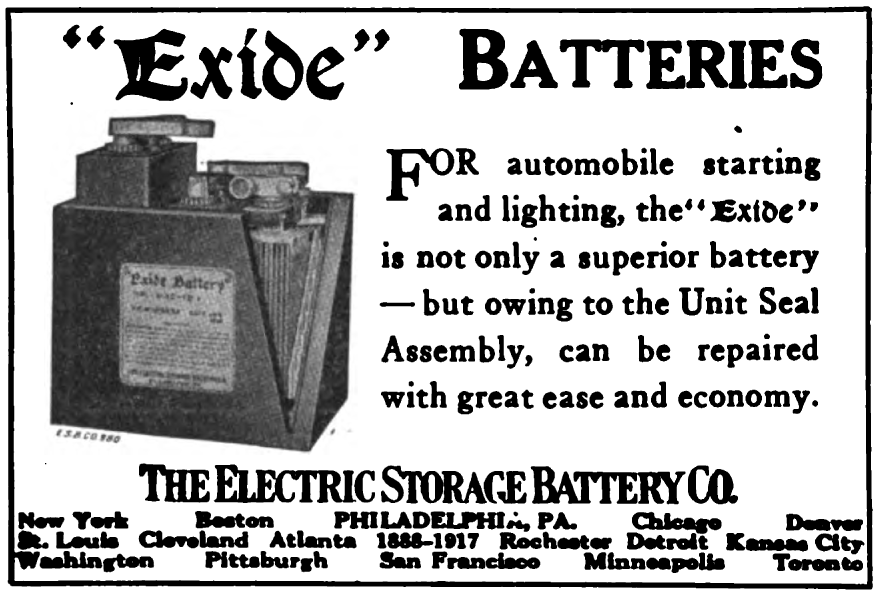
Electric Storage Battery Company advertisement for Exide batteries in the journal Horseless Age, 1918.

Exide's predecessor corporation was the Electric Storage Battery Company, founded by William Warren Gibbs in 1888. Gibbs purchased the ideas and patents of inventor Clement Payen to make the storage battery a commercial product. Gibbs targeted electric lighting companies so they could use the storage batteries to provide services to their customers.

In 1893 The Electric Storage Battery Company was producing lead chloride accumulators for stabilizing electric grids. Nine years later there were 220 accumulator installations in service enabling electric street rail.

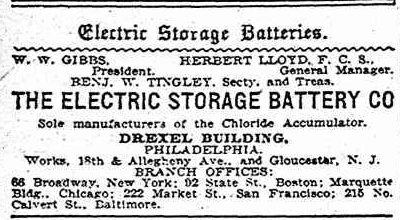
Advertisement for Electric Storage Battery Company 1897

W. W. Gibbs, president of the Electric Storage Battery Company, stated on the night of Sunday December 16, 1894 that the company had consummated the day before in New York the purchase of all patents and patent rights concerning the manufacture and use of electric storage batteries of the General Electric Company, the Edison company, the Thomson-Houston, the Brush, the Accumulator company, the Consolidated Electric Storage Company and the General Electric Launch Company. Mr. Gibbs asserted that this secured to the Electric Storage Battery Company the sole right to supply this country electric storage batteries of all the various types heretofore developed, as well as the protection of every decision thus far rendered by the federal courts in the interpretation of patents of this kind.

In 1898, an Exide brand battery provided the submerged power for the USS Holland (SS-1), the first submarine commissioned in the US Navy. Electric Storage remained a significant supplier of US Navy submarine batteries at least through World War II. Isaac Rice, president of Electric Storage in 1899, was instrumental in founding the Electric Boat Company as a bailout of the Holland Torpedo Boat Company.

=== 20th century ===
In 1900, the Electric Storage Battery Company developed a product of greater capacity and less weight for electric taxicabs. This battery was the first to bear the name Exide, short for "Excellent Oxide".

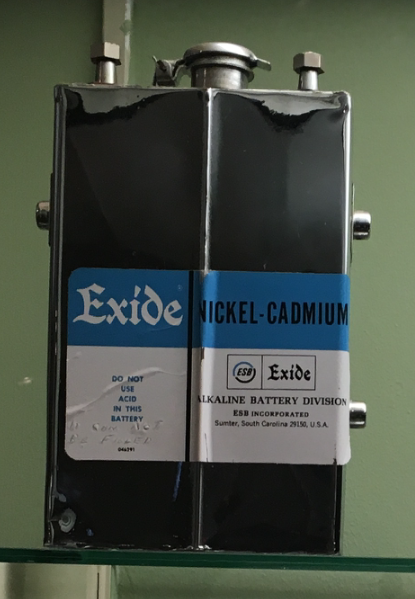
An Exide Nickel Cadmium battery

In 1902, The Electric Storage Battery Co. formed Willard Storage Battery Co. when they acquired the battery-making assets of a jewelry manufacturer in Cleveland, OH and incorporated them. By 1950 Willard automotive batteries were outselling Exide automotive batteries although The Electric Storage Battery Co. was larger due to diversification.

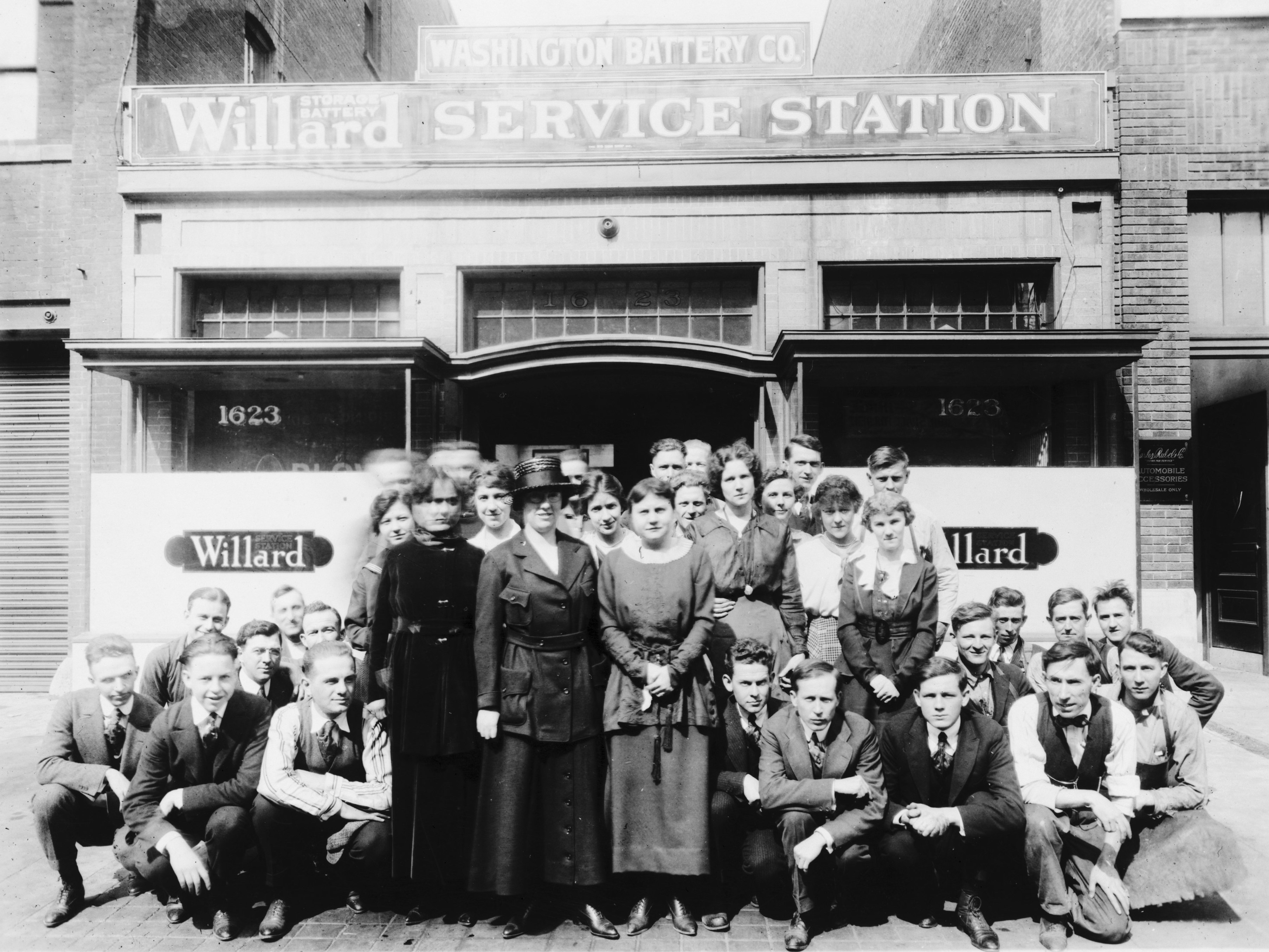
1919 Willard Service Station for battery-powered automobiles and employees of the Washington Battery Co., 1623 L Street N.W., Washington, D.C.

In 1911, Charles F. Kettering turned to the Electric Storage Battery Company for a suitable automotive battery to complement his new electric starter. This project yielded the first car battery of the modern type. (Within 5 years, there was a substantial field of aftermarket brands in storage batteries and starters for automobiles, as evidenced by the advertisements in automotive trade journals of the era.)

When the United States entered World War I, Exide batteries were used to operate airplane radio sets and power radio stations.

In 1920 the Electric Storage Battery Company purchased 40 acres of land in Crescentville, Philadelphia Pennsylvania to build a new plant at the estimated initial cost of two million US dollars.

In 1934 the Electric Storage Battery Company filed for the trademark Exide Ironclad and in 1935 their trademark was registered.

In 1938, the Electric Storage Battery Company acquired the Giant Storage Battery Company, and expanded into battery chargers and testers.

During World War II, the Electric Storage Battery Company was a major supplier of batteries for U.S. Navy submarines and primary contractor for batteries used in the Mark 18 electric torpedo.

The Electric Storage Battery Company entered the dry-cell battery industry in 1957 when it acquired the Ray-O-Vac Company, the then second-largest producer of dry-cell batteries in the US.

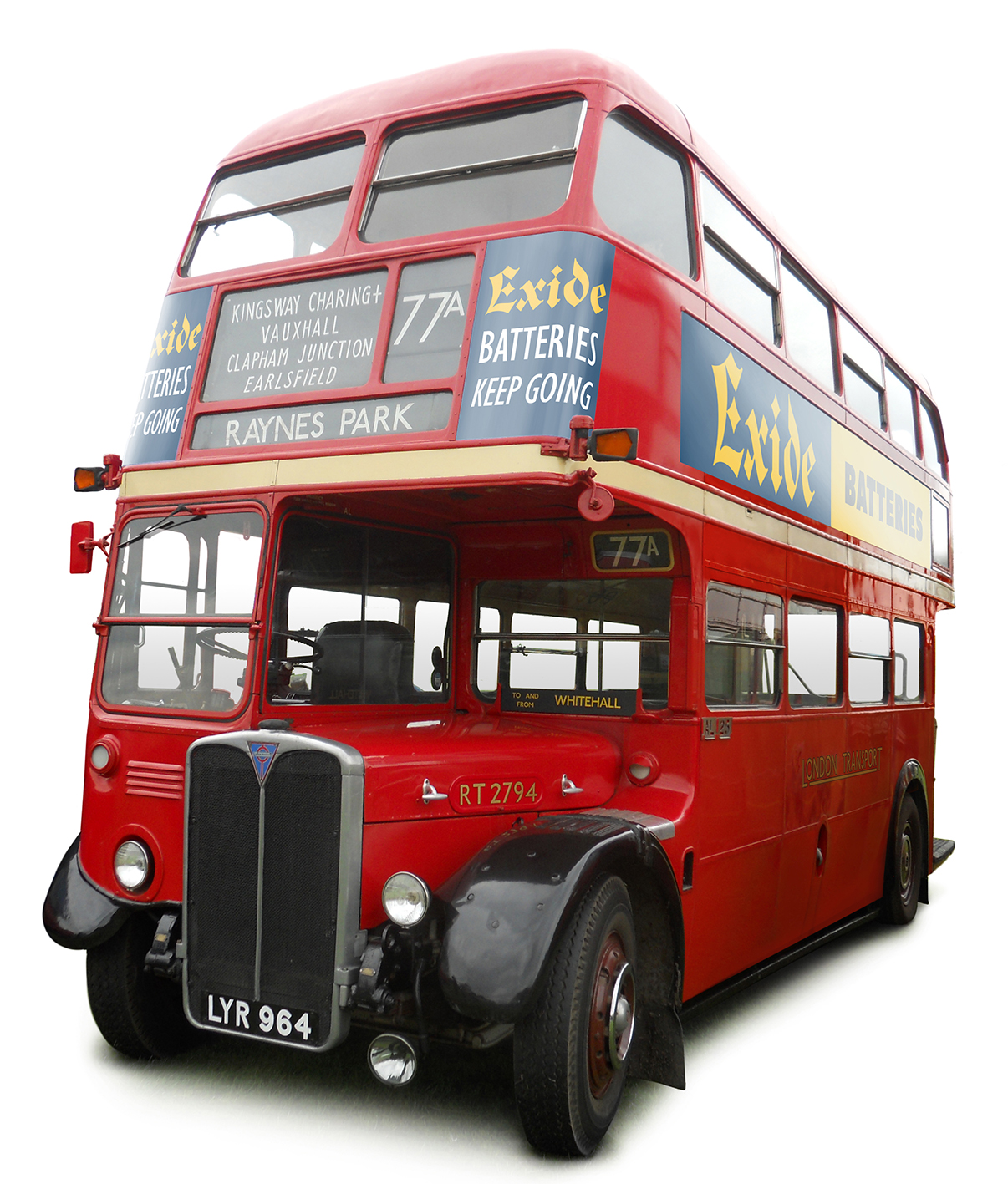
London Transport RT Bus with 1950/60s period Exide Advertisements

NASA used solar-charged, nickel-zinc Exide batteries on all of the Apollo program missions.

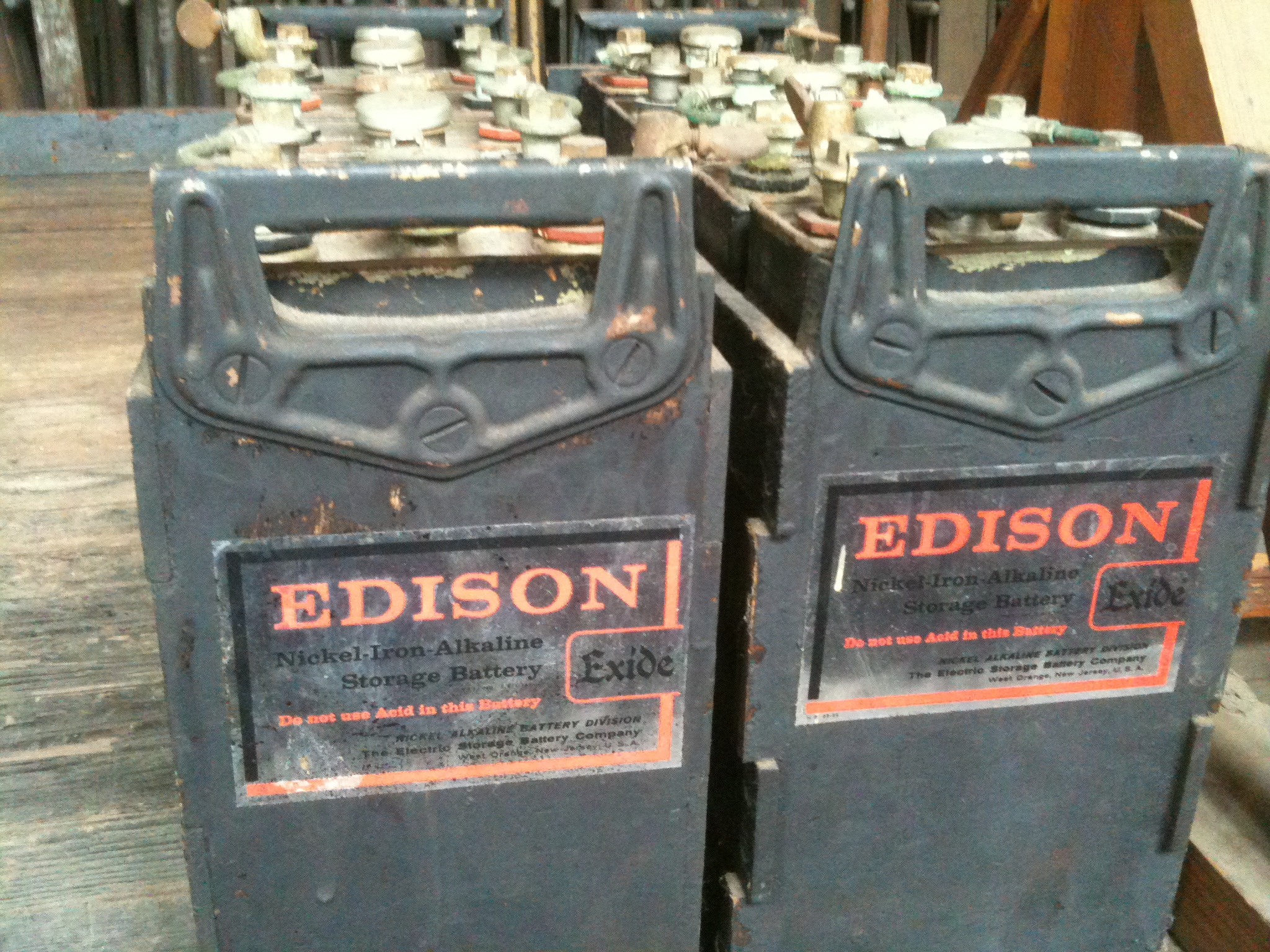
Nickel-iron batteries, originally developed in 1901 by Thomas Edison, manufactured between 1972 and 1975 under the "Exide" brand.

In 1967 The Electric Storage Battery Company was merged into ESB Incorporated.

In 1972, ESB Inc. acquired the Edison Storage Battery Company, which had developed a practical nickel-iron battery in 1901. The production of this type of battery was subsequently discontinued in 1975.

From 1974 through 1978 ESB Inc. became Inco Electroenergy Corporation as the result of the first hostile takeover in the US. In 1983 Inco sold their Exide Corporation unit to the First Chicago Investment Corporation and principals of the Spectrum Group.

In 1987, Exide Corp. (doing business as Exide Technologies) acquired General Battery Corporation and moved the company headquarters to Reading, Pennsylvania.

Exide became a publicly traded company in October 1993.

Arthur M. Hawkins resigned as chairman and chief executive officer of Exide in October 1998.

=== 21st century ===
In 2000, Exide acquired GNB Technologies, a North American supplier of automotive batteries.

In 2002, Exide filed for bankruptcy after compiling a debt of $2.5 billion as a result of the recent acquisitions. In April 2004, a judge approved the company's plan to eliminate $1.3 billion in debt and exit bankruptcy protection by the end of the month

In April 2013, Exide closed its battery-recycling plant in Vernon, California (Los Angeles County).

In June 2013, Exide again filed for Chapter 11 bankruptcy protection with the aim of cutting debt and implementing a restructuring plan (Exide Technologies, Case No. 13-11482, U.S. Bankruptcy Court, District of Delaware).

In April 2015, the company emerged from Chapter 11 bankruptcy protection, which reduced its debt by approximately $600 million.

On May 20, 2015, the company announced the appointment of Victor M. (Vic) Koelsch, former executive vice president, Michelin North America, as president and chief executive officer of the company.

On May 24, 2017, Exide completed a series of financing transactions to fund growth and additional capacity.

On October 25, 2017, Exide Technologies unveiled a $35 Million grid manufacturing facility in Kansas City, Missouri.

On May 24, 2018, Exide expanded its motive power offering with acquisition of Aker Wade Power Technologies.

On November 14, 2018, Exide named Timothy D. Vargo, former president and CEO of AutoZone, President and chief executive officer of the company. Tim is also chairman of the board.

Between January 10 and July 30, 2019, Exide appointed new leadership in its CIO, CLO, COO, CFO, and President EMEA positions.

On April 2, 2019, Battery Systems, Inc. acquired Exide's branch network business and became the exclusive distributor of Exide-branded aftermarket transportation batteries.

On June 26, 2019, Exide completed a comprehensive new financing and recapitalization transaction which "enhanced the Company’s liquidity, extended debt maturities and deleveraged its balance sheet."

On May 19, 2020, Exide (and four subsidiaries) filed for Chapter 11 bankruptcy protection to facilitate the sale of its North American assets. In July 2020, Exide sold certain North American assets to Atlas Holdings.

On August 25, 2020, Atlas Holdings launched standalone companies Stryten Manufacturing and Element Resources following its acquisition of substantially all the operating assets of the Americas business of Exide Technologies, LLC. The transaction completes a court-supervised sale process, pursuant to Section 363 of the U.S. Bankruptcy code.

On October 16, 2020, a federal bankruptcy court allowed Exide to divest itself of responsibilities for multiple waste sites including Exide's battery recycling plant in Vernon, CA, near Los Angeles.

In July 2024, Exide Technologies unveiled Solition Mega Three, the latest in their containerized energy storage series.

In 2025, Exide Technologies announced that the Fulmen Commercial Vehicle battery line and other developments would be showcased at the Equip Auto Trade Fair in Paris.

== Locations ==
Exide Technologies' global headquarters was located in Milton, Georgia. It had both manufacturing and recycling plants located throughout the U.S. and Europe. Exide Technologies's Headquarters is located in Gennevilliers, France. Exide operates in approximately 80 countries around the world.

Exide operates three R&D facilities including one in the U.S. (Milton, Georgia), and two in Europe (Büdingen, Germany and Azuqueca, Spain).

Exide operates seven manufacturing plants and three recycling plants in the U.S. In Europe, Exide operates ten manufacturing plants and three recycling facilities.

Exide maintains principal sales offices in Mexico City, São Paulo, Dubai, Shanghai, Hong Kong and Sydney.

== Products ==
Exide produces batteries and accessories for the transportation market, including original-equipment and aftermarket products for auto/truck/SUV, heavy duty, lawn and garden, marine/RV, golf carts and power sport, using absorbed glass mat (AGM), flooded, enhanced flooded battery, and gel (VRLA) technologies. Exide also markets lithium-ion batteries for motorbikes in Europe.

Exide serves the industrial market with lead–acid and lithium-ion batteries for motive power material handling (forklifts), railroad, mining and submarine applications. Exide also provides chargers and fast chargers for material handling applications, as well as modeling and real time monitoring products. Exide produces energy storage for industrial network power markets including telecommunications, uninterruptible power supply (UPS), utilities, and solar energy, as well as for other critical backup needs.

== Criticism and concerns ==
Exide was one of the world's largest producers, distributors and recyclers of lead-acid batteries. As early as 1937 employees said that the Electric Storage Battery Company was negligent in protecting their workers. Since 2010, operations at seven Exide lead-acid battery plants have been linked to ambient airborne lead levels that posed a health risk to the environment and residents in communities and neighborhoods surrounding the Exide plants.

Concerns have been raised about their environmental practices. Lead and other dangerous chemicals coming from Exide's plants have repeatedly polluted communities around the United States, triggering protests and extensive media coverage.

In March 2001, Exide pleaded guilty to fraud conspiracy charges and agreed to pay a fine of $27.5 million to end a federal criminal investigation into auto battery sales to customers of Sears. The case arose from investigations and accusations that Exide conspired with Sears to sell used batteries as new to Sears customers and that Exide officials had paid bribes to conceal the fraud. In 2002, two former top executives of Exide were sentenced to prison for their scheme to sell defective batteries to Sears. Former Exide president Douglas N. Pearson was sentenced to five years and four months in prison and ordered to pay a $150,000 fine. Pearson's accomplice, former Exide chief executive Arthur M. Hawkins, was sentenced to 10 years in prison and ordered to pay a $1 million fine. The two were convicted of wire fraud and conspiracy to commit wire fraud in a huge scheme to sell defective Exide batteries to Sears for its Die-hard battery line.

In 2008, it was reported that Exide was emitting two times the number of pollutants allowed into the environment at their secondary lead-acid battery smelter plant in Bristol, Tennessee.

In 2013, Exide was under federal criminal investigation for emitting high levels of harmful pollutants from its battery recycling plant in Vernon, California. Hundreds of residents had complained for years about Exide's toxic emissions before state and federal agencies acted.

In fall 2017, the Department of Toxic Substances Control began to implement their plans to remove lead-contaminated soil from 2,500 residential properties near the closed Exide lead-acid battery plant in Vernon. It is believed to be the largest environmental cleanup effort of its kind in California history, encompassing seven Los Angeles County neighborhoods. California state regulators estimate that Exide's operations may have threatened the health of an estimated 100,000 people and 10,000 residential properties. A total of $192 million has been authorized by the state for the massive cleanup effort; $176.6 million of which was approved by Governor Jerry Brown in April 2016.

== Sustainability and recycling ==
Exide is one of the largest secondary recyclers in the world, and one of few battery companies with the ability to provide Total Battery Management, also known as "closed loop recycling." Closed loop recycling frees customers from the burden of handling spent batteries in their own facilities. Recycling recovers 99% of all lead received at Exide's recycling centers. Every year Exide recycles millions of pounds of lead and recovers and neutralizes millions of gallons of sulfuric acid.

In 2017 Exide Technologies recycled 35 million pounds of plastic in the United States alone, which was used to produce 13 million new batteries.

Lead battery recycling is one of the best examples of a circular economy as recognized by the World Economic Forum.

Industry-wide, the closed loop process for recycling lead batteries keeps more than 1.7 million tons of lead batteries out of U.S. landfills annually.

Exide Technologies is a contributing member of the Advanced Lead Acid Battery Consortium (ALABC) and Lead Battery Research Working Group, formed by the North American lead battery industry with goals to advance technology, "undertake pre-competitive research to improve performance and longevity of lead batteries," and develop understanding of the crystal precipitation/dissolution process. Exide is also a member of EUROBAT, an association of European automotive and industrial battery manufacturers whose purpose is "to study all matters of interest to storage battery manufacturers and their sub-contractors in Europe, Middle East and Africa." Exide's president, CEO, and chairman, Timothy D. Vargo, is also a board member of Battery Council International, "a not-for-profit trade association formed to promote the interests of the international battery industry."
