= Mark 18 torpedo =

WW2 American torpedo

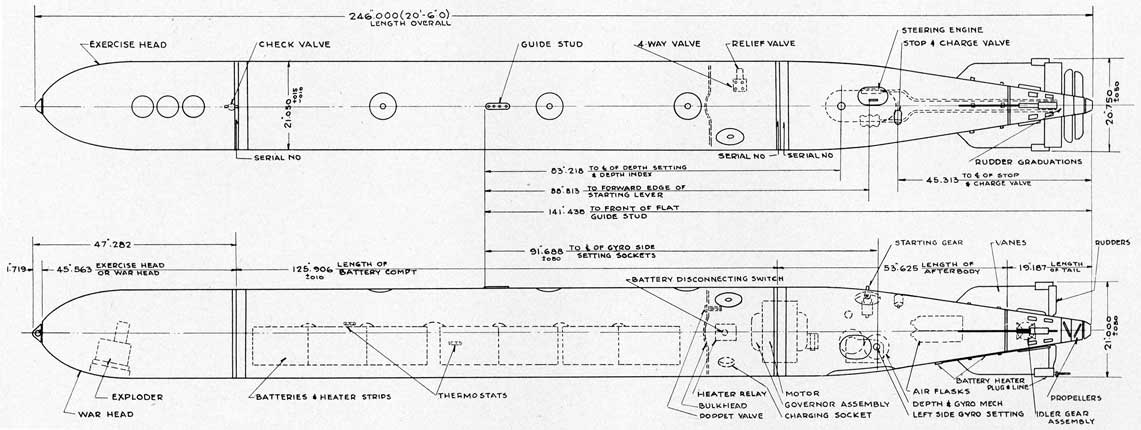
- Mark 18 torpedo general profile as illustrated in its service manual, April 1943
- Type: Anti-surface ship torpedo
- Place of origin: United States

Service history
- In service: 1943–1950
- Used by: United States Navy
- Wars: World War II

Production history
- Designer: Westinghouse Electric; Electric Storage Battery Co.
- Designed: 1943
- Manufacturer: Westinghouse Electric; Naval Ordnance Station Forest Park
- Produced: 1943–1945
- No. built: 9000

Specifications
- Mass: 3,154 lb (1,431 kg)
- Length: 245 in (6.2 m)
- Diameter: 21 in (530 mm)
- Effective firing range: 4,000 yd (3,700 m)
- Warhead: Mod 0 Torpex, Mod 2 Torpex/HBX, Mod 3, HBX
- Warhead weight: Mod 0 600 lb (272 kg), Mod 2 595 lb (270 kg), Mod 3 575 lb (261 kg)
- Detonation mechanism: Mk 8 contact exploder, Mk 9 contact/influence exploder
- Engine: Electric motor
- Maximum speed: 29 kn (54 km/h)
- Guidance system: Gyroscope
- Launch platform: Submarines

The Mark 18 torpedo was an electric torpedo used by the United States Navy during World War II. The Mark 18 was the first electric storage battery torpedo manufactured for the US Navy and it was designed primarily for use as a submarine-launched torpedo.

== Development ==
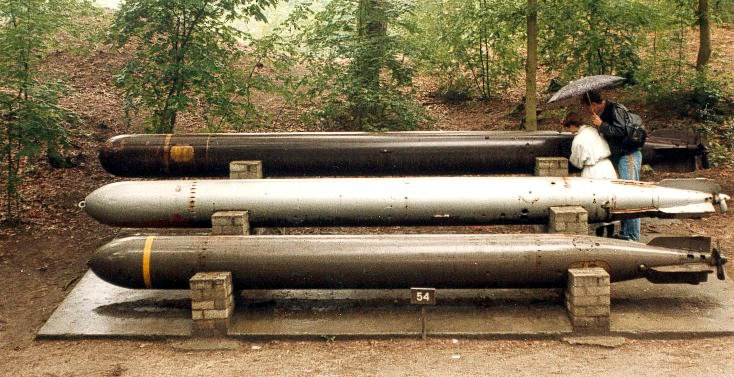
British Mark XI on top, German G7e(TIII) with a US warhead in the middle and a US Mark 18 at the bottom

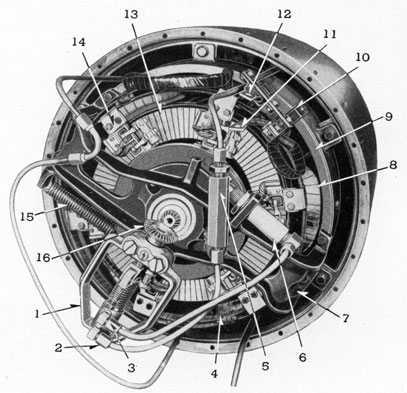
Mark 18's electric motor

The Mark 18 was built in competition with the Bureau of Ordnance electric torpedoes, which had been in development at the Naval Torpedo Station (NTS), Newport, Rhode Island, since the 1920s, in particular the Mark 20, originated in 1941 in collaboration with General Electric and Electric Storage Battery Company.

In 1942, several German G7e electric torpedoes ran ashore, leading CNO, Admiral Ernest J. King, to urge BuOrd to build an electric torpedo for the U.S. Navy's own submarines. BuOrd told NTS to get the Mark 20 in shape, or drop it in favor of a copy, with the primary emphasis being speed of introduction. "Newport, typically, preferred its own finely machined project", but neither General Electric nor NTS had the facilities. As a result, BuOrd turned to Westinghouse Electric & Manufacturing Company, which on 10 March 1942 got all data and designs for electric torpedoes NTS had produced so far.

Westinghouse quickly decided to copy the G7e, and "went to work with a speed and fervor that was dazzling" (certainly in comparison to NTS's languid pace). Design was complete by mid-April, and a contract for 2,000 Mark 18s, 2,020 warheads, 543 exercise heads (for training shots), tools, spares, and workshop gear was issued 2 May. The first test models were delivered just 15 weeks after Westinghouse started work and the Mark 18 was promised to the Submarine Force by summer 1942.

=== Problems ===
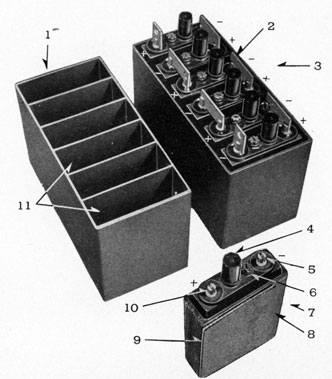
The Mark 18 torpedo's battery monoblock container, each holding six plates

The batteries (provided by Exide) did not deliver hoped-for performance and gave off too much hydrogen gas (a fire hazard shipboard, and potentially lethal in submarines), and there were bugs in production, in part because of the fine tolerances necessary and the need to use unskilled labor. NTS, as usual, "offered no help", refusing even to pass on trial data. Trials, supervised by Commander Oliver G. Kirk (whose Lapon was sent to Newport to aid in testing in July 1943), aided by "Spike" Hottel (relieved from command of Grouper in October), did not go well. Eli Reich, Lapon's exec, described NTS's attitude as near to sabotage. Kirk and Reich drafted a scathing memo, which ended up on the desk of Admiral Lockwood, who took the matter to William H. "Spike" Blandy, Chief of BuOrd, who (after months of disparaging submariners over the problems with the Mark 14, and while still complaining he could not get a good project officer from Lockwood) agreed to push the Mark 18 ahead.

== Deployment ==
The first submarines to use Mark 18s (still not perfected) were Eugene Sands' Spearfish and Mush Morton's Wahoo in September 1943. Sands "experienced enough torpedo problems to drive an ordinary man berserk": one sank, one broached and ran wild, three fishtailed at launch and hit the outer doors before disappearing, and seven missed astern. His results, as described by his squadron commander, "Gin" Styer, "were disappointing".

Some 30% of torpedoes fired by U.S. submarines in the Pacific War were Mark 18s.

The design was dropped from service in 1950 in favor of faster and more reliable later types.

== Characteristics ==
The Mark 18 did not produce a wake of bubbles or turbine exhaust pointing back to the submarine firing it – a major advantage in daytime engagements. The torpedo also lacked the depth-keeping and exploder problems that had plagued the Mark 14. The disadvantages were the low speed compared to the Mark 14's 45 kn (83 km/h; 52 mph), the need to regularly withdraw the torpedoes from their tubes for recharging, sensitivity of the batteries to water temperature, and onerous maintenance procedures. The Mark 18 shared one major flaw with the Mark 14: it had no protection against circular runs, a defect which claimed Tang for certain, and possibly other U.S. submarines, as well; "Donc" Donaho's Flying Fish was nearly sunk by a trial model in October 1943.

The Mark 18 was 20 feet (6.1 m) long, weighed 3,154 pounds (1,431 kg), had a warhead of 575 pounds (261 kg) of Torpex with a contact exploder, and had a speed of 29 knots (54 km/h; 33 mph) and a maximum range of 4,000 yards (3,700 m). By July 1944, an improved version had appeared.

== See also ==
- American 21-inch torpedo

== Bibliography ==
- Grulich, Fred (2003). "Loss of the Battleship Royal Oak". Warship International. XL (2): 133. ISSN 0043-0374. discusses how the Mk 18 was based on the G7e
