= Naval Ordnance Station Forest Park =

- Forest Park, Illinois in United States

Site information
- Operator: United States Navy
- Condition: Closed, converted to shopping mall

Location
- Coordinates: 41°51′48″N 87°48′50″W

Site history
- Built: October 28, 1942
- Built by: Amertorp Corporation and Albert Kahn (architect)
- In use: 1942–1971

Naval Ordnance Station Forest Park (NOSF) was in Forest Park, Illinois, United States. It was founded during World War II (1942-1945) as Naval Ordnance Plant Forest Park (NOPF). The Forest Park Station was instrumental in building torpedoes for the Navy, employing up to 6,500 workers and producing 19,000 torpedoes. Torpedo production was halted in 1945 and research and development was performed until the main plant was shuttered and converted into a mall in 1971. The remaining facilities were turned into a Naval Reserve Center until it was finally closed in April 2007.
