= Acoustic torpedo =

Torpedo that aims itself

Simple acoustic torpedo. Two acoustic transducers will react upon sound and the torpedo will detect that the signal comes from one of the sides. It will then issue a command to turn towards the target. When the sound is "equal" on both sides, the torpedo will follow a straight path until it reaches its target.

An acoustic torpedo aims itself by listening for characteristic sounds of its target or by searching for it using sonar (acoustic homing). Acoustic torpedoes are usually designed for medium-range use, and are often fired from a submarine.

The first passive acoustic torpedoes were developed nearly simultaneously by the United States Navy and the Germans during World War II. The Germans developed the G7e/T4 Falke, which was first deployed by the submarines U-603, U-758 and U-221 in March 1943. Few of these torpedoes were used; they were quickly phased out of service in favor of their successor, the G7es T5 Zaunkönig torpedo in August 1943. The T5 first saw widespread use in September 1943 against North Atlantic escort vessels and merchant ships in convoys.

On the Allied side, the US Navy developed the Mark 24 mine, which was an aircraft-launched, anti-submarine passive acoustic homing torpedo. The first production Mk. 24s were delivered to the U.S. Navy in March 1943, and the type scored its first verified combat kills in May 1943. About 204 torpedoes were launched against submarine targets, with 37 Axis submarines being sunk and a further 18 damaged.

Since its introduction, the acoustic torpedo has proven to be an effective weapon against surface ships as well as serving as an anti-submarine weapon. Today, acoustic torpedoes are mostly used against submarines.

== Overview ==
Acoustic homing torpedoes are equipped with a pattern of acoustic transducers on the nose of the weapon. By a process of phase delaying the signals from these transducers a series of "acoustic beams" (i.e. a variation of acoustic signal sensitivity dependent on the incident angle of the noise energy). In early homing torpedoes the "beam patterns" were fixed, whereas in more modern weapons the patterns were modifiable under on-board computer control. These sensor systems are capable of either detecting sound originating from the target itself i.e. engine and machinery noise, propeller cavitation, etc., known as passive sonar, or responding to noise energy reflections as a result of "illuminating" the target with sonar pulses, known as active sonar. Acoustic torpedoes can be compared to modern fire-and-forget guided missiles: the target, usually a submarine, will be detected by sonar whatever its course. The torpedo will start trying to detect the target with passive sonar; on detecting an apparent target, it will switch over to active sonar and will begin to track the target. At this point, the target will probably have started evasive maneuvers and may have deployed a noisemaker. The torpedo's logic circuitry, if not fooled by the noisemaker, will home in on the noise signature of the target.

Before a torpedo is launched, the target must be "boxed in". A fire control system on the firing platform will set an initial search depth range which is passed to the weapon's microprocessor. The search parameters cover the expected depth of the target.

=== Operational use ===
==== Nazi Germany ====
The initial impact of the acoustic torpedo in the Battle of the Atlantic prior to the widespread deployment of countermeasures cannot be overstated. The German U-boats now had an effective "fire and forget" weapon capable of homing in on merchant ships and attacking escorts, at close quarters of only three or four hundred yards. By the summer of 1943, the German U-boat campaign was experiencing severe setbacks in the face of massive anti-submarine efforts integrating Coastal Command attacks in the Bay of Biscay, the deployment of merchant aircraft carriers in convoys, new anti-submarine technologies such as hedgehog and improved radar, and the use of dedicated hunter-killer escort groups.

The Allies' improved escorts had greater range, and the use of fuelling at sea added hundreds of miles to the escort groups' radius of action. From June to August 1943 the number of merchant ships sunk in the Atlantic was almost insignificant, while the number of U-boats destroyed rose disproportionally, causing them to generally withdraw from the Bay of Biscay. For a time, the acoustic torpedo again put the escorts and convoys on the defensive, starting with the attacks in September 1943 on Convoys ONS 18/ON 202.

==== United States ====
Two actions in May 1943 have a claim for the first U-boat sunk by a US Navy's Mark 24 "mine", actually an acoustic homing torpedo designed in 1942 for antisubmarine warfare. On 14 May, a USN Catalina flying boat sank U-657 or U-640. A notable incident involving the Mark 24 occurred in the night of 24 June 1944. The escort carrier USS Bogue had been tracking the Japanese submarine I-52, which was on its way to France carrying raw materials and minerals. After a rendezvous with the German submarine U-530, which transferred a Naxos radar detector to I-52, the Japanese unit was spotted on the surface by two Grumman Avenger aircraft. They dropped depth charges; I-52 managed to dive, but the planes dropped sonobuoys and launched two Mark 24s, both of which hit the submarine, sinking it. The attack was recorded on audio tape that is preserved in the US National Archives.

=== Countermeasures ===
==== World War 2 ====
The German T5 torpedoes were countered by Allied introduction of the noise maker code-named Foxer, a British-built acoustic decoy used to confuse German acoustic homing torpedoes. A US version codenamed FXR was deployed at the end of September 1943 on all transatlantic escort vessels, but was soon replaced by the more effective Fanfare noisemaker.

The device consisted of one or two noise-making devices towed several hundred metres astern of the ship. The noise makers mechanically generated a far louder cavitation noise than the ship's propellers, which decoyed the acoustic torpedoes away from the rear of the ship into a circling pattern around the noise maker until the torpedo ran out of fuel. The downside of the Foxer was that it also rendered the ship's own ASDIC ineffective and concealed any other U-boat nearby that could home in on the convoy.

Nevertheless, the FXR countermeasure proved to be highly effective in decoying German acoustic torpedoes. Of the c. 700 G7es torpedoes fired, only about 77 hit.

Aside from decoys, British analysts developed a maneuver known as "Step-Aside": a warship, upon spotting a U-boat, would trick the U-boat into firing its acoustic torpedo early, and then make a hard turn to put itself out of the torpedo's detection arc, after which it could bear down to attack the U-boat.

==== Postwar ====
The AN/SLQ-25 Nixie (and AN/SLQ-25A and variants) is a towed decoy deployed on USN and allied surface ships for defending against passive acoustic homing torpedoes. Another, more modern, such system is the AN/SLQ-61 Lightweight Tow (LWT) Torpedo Defense Mission Module (TDMM).

=== Captured technology ===
The capture of U-505 of 4 June 1944 marked the first time that allied forces gained direct access to this technology.

In September 1944, the Soviet Navy discovered T5 torpedoes aboard the German submarine U-250, which had been sunk in shallow waters by the depth charges of the Soviet submarine chasers Mo 103 and Mo 105 off Beryozovye Islands. The torpedoes were safely delivered to surface ships. Key components of the G7es T-5 Zaunkönig torpedo were later ordered by Joseph Stalin to be given to British naval specialists. However, after a protracted journey to Kronstadt the two Royal Navy officers were not allowed access to the submarine and returned home empty handed.

== Military examples ==
United States

- RUR-5 ASROC - Ship-launched anti-submarine missile
- MK 48 - ADCAP submersion launch torpedo
- MK 24 / MK 27 - Passive homing surface / submersible fire torpedo
- MK 32 - Active homing surface / submersible / air fire torpedo

== Bibliography ==
- Cutler, Thomas J. The Battle of Leyte Gulf. New York: Simon and Schuster, 1996
- Clancy, Tom. Red Storm Rising. New York: Penguin and Putnam, 1986
- Lincoln, Ashe (1961). Secret Naval Investigator. London: William Kimber and Co. Ltd.
- Morison, Samuel (2002). History of United States Naval Operations in World War II Vol 10, The Atlantic Battle Won, May 1943 – May 1945. Champaign, IL: University of Illinois Press. ISBN 978-0252070617.
- Showell, Jak (2009). Hitler's Navy: A Reference Guide to the Kriegsmarine 1935-1945. Barnsley, UK: Seaforth Publishing, 2009. ISBN 978-1848320208.
- Schull, Joseph (1961). The Far Distant Ships (Canadian Ministry of National Defence ed.). Ottawa: Queen's Printer, Ottawa Canada.
- Williamson, Gordon (2012). U-boat Tactics in World War II. London, UK: Bloomsbury Publishing. ISBN 978-1849081740.
- ADM 199/2022 analysis of u-boat operations in the vicinity of convoys ONS 18 and ON 202
