= High Blast Explosive =

Type of explosive

High Blast Explosive, or HBX, is an explosive used as a bursting charge in missile warheads, mines, depth bombs, depth charges, and torpedoes.

== History ==
It was developed during World War II as a desensitized modification of Torpex explosives.

== Properties ==
It is an aluminized (powdered aluminum) explosive having the same order of sensitivity as Composition B.

Tests indicate that it is about 98% to 100% as powerful as Torpex, that it is definitely less sensitive than Torpex in both laboratory impact and bullet impact, that it is slightly more sensitive in these respects than TNT, and that it is about the same order as Composition B.

A difficulty with HBX is that water slowly reacts with aluminium powder and produces hydrogen gas, building up pressure in the case during storage. It was discovered that adding calcium chloride to the mixture will absorb all the moisture and eliminate the gassing.

== Composition ==
There are three types of HBX explosives: HBX-1, HBX-3, and H-6. Below is each type's "Grade A" composition based on weight:

- HBX-1

Composition	Percent by weight
RDX plus nitrocellulose, calcium chloride and calcium silicate	40.4 ± 3%
TNT	37.8 ± 3%
Aluminum	17.1 ± 3%
Wax plus lecithin	4.7 ± 1%

- HBX-3

Composition	Percent by weight
RDX plus nitrocellulose, calcium chloride and calcium silicate	31.3 ± 3%
TNT	29.0 ± 3%
Aluminum	34.8 ± 3%
Wax plus lecithin	4.9 ± 1%

- H-6

Composition	Percent by weight
RDX plus nitrocellulose, calcium chloride and calcium silicate	45.1 ± 3%
TNT	29.2 ± 3%
Aluminum	21.0 ± 3%
Wax plus lecithin	4.7 ± 1%
