= Roketsan Orka =

Orka
- Type: Lightweight ASW torpedo
- Place of origin: Turkey

Service history
- Used by: Turkish Navy

Production history
- Designed: End December 2020
- Manufacturer: Roketsan

Specifications
- Diameter: 324 mm (12.8 in)
- Warhead: HE shaped charge
- Engine: brushless electric motor
- Propellant: lithium batteries
- Operational range: 15 km (8.1 nmi)
- Maximum speed: 45 kn (83 km/h; 52 mph)
- Guidance system: Internal sonar guidance
- Launch platform: Surface combatant, helicopter, maritime patrol aircraft and unmanned aerial vehicle

Orka is a new-generation lightweight torpedo developed by Roketsan for the Turkish Navy.

== History ==
The development project for Orka was launched by end December 2020. The project is realized by Roketsan along with Aselsan. The lightweight torpedo can be deployed from surface combatants, helicopters, maritime patrol aircraft and unmanned aerial vehicles for underwater targets.

== Features ==
Powered by a brushless DC electric motor and propelled by pump-jet using high-energy Lithium batteries, Orka is able to achieve a speed exceeding 45 kn (83 km/h; 52 mph) and a range of more than 15 km (8.1 nmi). It has an underwater shock-insensitive warhead. Guided internally, the lightweight torpedo has active/passive sonar head and is capable of acoustic countermeasure. It has a diameter of 324 mm (12.8 in), It features an insensitive explosive hollow charge warhead.

== See also ==
- Mark 54 Lightweight Torpedo
- APR-3E torpedo - Russian equivalent
- A244-S - Italian equivalent
- MU90 Impact - French/Italian equivalent
- Sting Ray (torpedo) - British equivalent
- TAL Shyena - Indian equivalent
- Yu-7 torpedo - Chinese equivalent
- K745 Blue Shark - South Korean equivalent
