= CY-1 =

- Type: Anti-submarine missile
- Place of origin: China

Service history
- In service: late 1980s – present
- Used by: People's Liberation Army Navy

Production history
- Produced: late 1980s

Specifications
- Mass: ≈0.6 ton
- Length: ≈1.2 meter
- Diameter: ≈0.4 meter
- Wingspan: 1.2 meter
- Warhead: Lightweight torpedo
- Detonation mechanism: Semi-armor-piercing
- Engine: rocket motor
- Propellant: solid fuel
- Operational range: ≈20 km
- Maximum speed: supersonic
- Guidance system: inertial in flight, passive / active sonar in water
- Launch platform: Air, surface & submerged

The CY-1 (Chang Ying 长缨, Long Tassel, often erroneously referred as Chian Yu, 剑鱼, or Swordfish) is a Chinese anti-submarine missile carried on a variety of surface platforms, including the Luda class missile destroyers and Jiangwei class missile frigates. A series of CY ASW missiles have been developed based on CY-1. To date only a small number of CY-1 is known to have been produced and deployed on trial basis, despite the fact that it had first appeared on the defense exhibitions held in China in the late 1980s.

== CY-1 ==
The CY-1 is believed to similar in operation to the U.S. Navy ASROC. There is little information available regarding the development history, performance, and exact status of the missile, but it is understood that a few of the missiles were deployed on the PLA Navy Type 051 (Luda class) destroyers and Type 052H2G (Jiangwei-I class) frigates. The CY-1 is basically an anti-submarine torpedo of either the ET52 or Yu-7 class, delivered by a ballistic rocket. The delivery vehicle features four small stabilising fins and four control surfaces, and is powered by a solid-fuel rocket motor. The maximum range claimed by the developer was 10 nautical miles (or 18 km).

Based on the limited information released by the manufacturers as well as the Chinese own claim, the CY-1 is not an ASW missile as it is often referred, because one of the requirement for missile is to have guidance in its flight, and this is exactly what CY-1 lacks. The missile is fired into the general direction of the target submarine as an unguided rocket, and the guidance does not kick in until after the payload, namely, the torpedo has entered water. As a result, the official Chinese term of "rocket propelled (ASW) torpedo" is a much more accurate description for this weapon. When the payload is a depth charge instead of the torpedo, the weapon is called "long range ASW rocket"".

Though originally tested onboard Luda class missile destroyers and Jiangwei class missile frigates, the CY-1 can be carried by any surface combatant with C-801/802/803 launchers, from which the CY-1 can be launched, thus increasing the versatility and reducing the cost. In addition, a version is further modified so that it can be launched from torpedo tubes of submarines like the C-801, but there is not any confirmation that this version has entered the service. In an effort to boost possible export, the CY-1 has also been modified to carrying a various range of light torpedoes, such as that of USA, Italy, and Russian. However, there is no known export as of 2007. The CY-1 is also known to have been tested on the Type 039 submarine.

== CY-2 ==
CY-2 (长缨-2) is a development of CY-1, and it is based on C-802 missile, sharing the same turbo jet engine. The missile is in limited service in Chinese navy after numerous tests, the last of which was the test of the air-launched version, which was successfully completed by Harbin SH-5 in 1994. The major improvement is the range of this weapon is tripled to 30 nautical miles (56 km), but the speed is reduced to subsonic level from CY-1's Mach 1.5. Just like the way CY-1 can be stored and launched from the container/launcher of C-801, CY-2 can be stored and launched from the container/launcher of C-802. The publicized data for CY-2 includes:

- Diameter: 36 cm
- Wingspan: 118 cm
- Weight: 610 kg
- Speed: Mach 0.9
- Length: 450 cm
- Range: 55 km

Although a development of CY-1, CY-2 is not exactly the replacement of CY-1 and the two are used concurrently by the Chinese navy. One of the reason is that due to space limitation, most of the light surface combatants of the Chinese navy cannot accommodate the large complex sonars on board larger warships. The range of smaller sonars on these light surface combatants of in Chinese navy is less than that of CY-2, and thus the longer range of CY-2 can not be fully exploited if it is on board these smaller surface combatants. As a result, CY-1 remains on board submarine chasers where rocket propelled ASW torpedoes (or ASW rockets) are deployed, while CY-2 is often deployed on larger warships. Another reason for keep CY-1 in the inventory is that CY-1 can be put away and stored like a log without maintenance for sometime, but CY-2 requires periodically maintenance in storage. CY-2 entered Chinese service at the end of 2006.

Just like CY-1, CY-2 is also frequently but erroneously referred as an ASW missile, while in reality it is not, because there is not any guidance at the stage of aerial flight. Developer has claimed that CY-2 can also be armed with a depth charge instead of a lightweight torpedo, but there is no indication of such version has ever entered Chinese service. There are claims of CY-2 being test fired by Chinese submarines, but there is no confirmation that CY-2 has been deployed on Chinese submarines due to lack of information.

== CY-3 ==
CY-3 (长缨-3), which is a development of CY-2. Like CY-2, CY-3 can be launched from a variety of platforms, including aircraft, surface ships, submarines, land vehicles, and coastal shore batteries. However, despite the successful completion of the development and receiving state certification for service, only very limited number are in service with Chinese navy, mostly for long term evaluation purposes. CY-3 is facing stiff competition from another Chinese missile CJ-1, which is also under Chinese naval evaluation, and the final selection has not been decided yet.

CY-3 is basically a modified CY-2 to carry Russian light weight APR-3E torpedo, which is larger and heavier than western light weight ASW torpedoes. Although APR-3E has much higher speed than its western counterparts, thus its target is difficult to outrun it when locked on, the range of APR-3E is extremely limited, only around 3 km. During the course of flight that may take up to several minutes, a very fast nuclear powered submarine might be able to escape because it could open up the distance by 3 km during that time. To overcome this shortcoming, a one-way data link is added, so that targeting information can be received from platforms such as aircraft and surface ships, to ensure the point of entry is as close to the target as possible so that target would be in range. It is also considered helpful when targeting information is changed after the weapon is launched, as in the case of the targeting information being updated: Several attack plans are pre-programmed in the computer on board the torpedo carried by the weapon, and when target update occurs, the new information is passed on the weapon, so that the torpedo carried can switch to the best attack plan from the original one selected prior to the update. However, it is not clear if CY-3 has entered service in any significant numbers due to competition from CJ-1, and there are no official governmental sources of confirmation to date.

== CY-4 ==
CY-4 is a modified CY-1 to enable it to also carry larger and heavier Russian APR-3E torpedo, and it can be carried by light ASW helicopters such as Harbin Z-9. Although official Chinese governmental sources have not explicitly identified the CY-4 designation, military enthusiasts and analysts have concluded that the missile is CY-4 instead of CY-2 or CY-3, because none of the photos of the missile shown has any inlets, which is the characteristic of turbojet engine that powers CY-2/3. The motors are solid rockets which power CY-1/4. CY-4 became operational in late 2009.

== CY-5 ==
CY-5 is the vertically launched version of CY-4 with folding control surfaces to fit into VLS. The range is reported to be 30 km. The existence of CY-5 type weapon was first officially revealed in 2012 when Type 054A frigate was opened to public in Hong Kong, when the governmental explanation described the modular VLS at the bow of the ship can launch both air defense missiles and rocket propelled ASW torpedoes armed with various Chinese and western torpedoes. However, the exact designation of the rocket propelled ASW torpedo was not revealed. Because CY series was also first intended for export and armed with torpedoes of western origin, CY-5 is thus also most likely armed with Chinese Y-7, or other western light torpedoes such as A244-S. CY-5 is reportedly also deployed onboard Type 052D destroyer.

== Yu-8 ==
Yu-8 (Chinese: 魚-8) is a vertically launched rocket propelled anti-submarine missile. The VLS-launched missile uses a torpedo as a warhead. It is similar to CY-5, but with a different payload. The exact type of the lightweight torpedo (LWT) carried by Yu-8 has not been officially released by the Chinese governmental sources (as of 2016), but many military analysts and enthusiasts have concluded it is the Russian APR-3E torpedo based on other information released officially by the Chinese government in 2015, namely, the incorporation of data link on Yu-8.

The existence of Yu-8 designation was first revealed in March 2014, and confirmed more than a year later by CCTV-7 in August 2015, when it aired a footage of Chinese naval war game that contained the launch of rocket propelled ASW missile from VLS of a Chinese warship, with designation Yu-8 assigned. Yu-8 is designed by the 705th Research Institute in Kunming, with program begun in 2002 and completed in 2006.

ET80 or Yu-8E is a version of Yu-8 modified for export. The warhead section is derived from a ET52C (Yu-7 export variant) or ET-60. The export version is described as a vertically launched torpedo armed missile for targeting conventional and nuclear submarines from a mid-to-large size vessel.

== See also ==
- Export torpedoes of China
- SUBROC
- ASROC
- Ikara
- Malafon
- MILAS
- Sea Lance
