= MU 90 =

MU 90 may refer to:

- MU90 Impact, a European antisubmarine torpedo
- MU-90, a Czechoslovakia mine-laying variant of the Soviet BMP-1 infantry fighting vehicle
