= EuroTorp =

Torpedo consortium

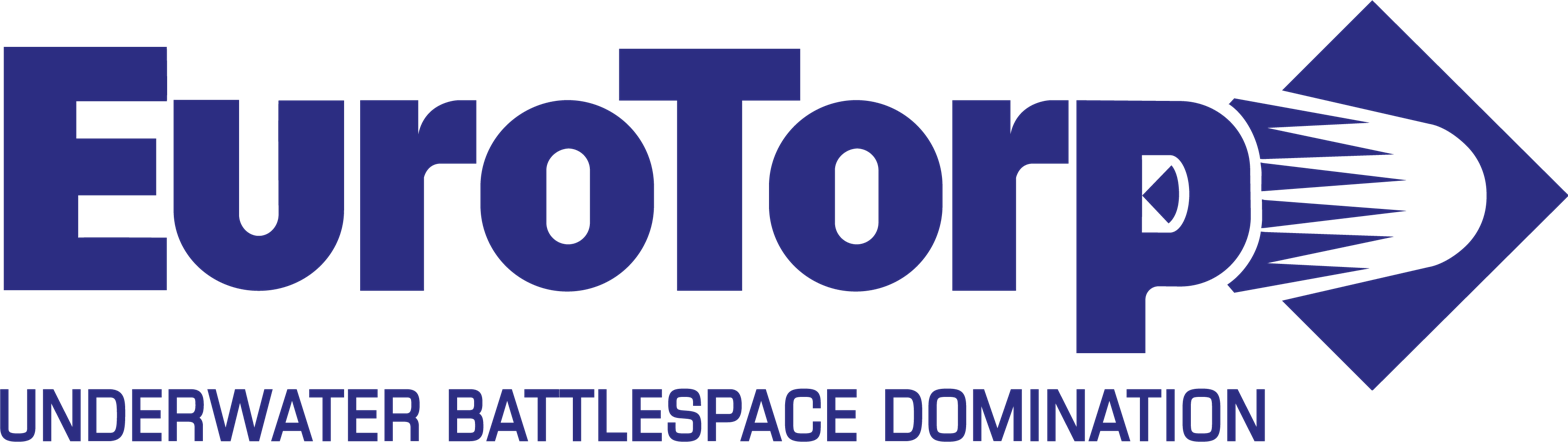
- Industry: Defence industry
- Founded: 1993
- Products: Torpedoes
- Owner: Leonardo S.p.A. Naval Group; Thales
- Website: https://www.eurotorp.com/

GEIE EuroTorp is a consortium that produces the MU90 anti-submarine torpedo. EuroTorp was formed in July 1993 by French and Italian defense companies after their governments signed a memorandum of understanding on industrial cooperation for the development of a common lightweight torpedo.

The following companies make up EuroTorp:

- WASS Submarine Systems (previously Whitehead Alenia Sistemi Subacquei): 50%
- Naval Group (previously DCNS Group) for and on behalf of DCNS, through DCN/SC/Stz: 26%
- Thales (previously Thomson-CSF) through Thales Underwater Systems: 24%

EuroTorp's role is to develop, manufacture and market the MU90 and associated torpedo launching systems. As the designated contractor for lightweight torpedoes, it was initially also responsible for Italy's remaining A244-S torpedoes, which are now no longer used by France and Italy. EuroTorp is also responsible for logistical support, achieving compliance with operational specifications, integration on launching platforms, and the development of new systems such as the "Hard Kill" and submarine-launched versions of the MU90.
