= Sting Ray (torpedo) =

British, acoustic homing, light-weight

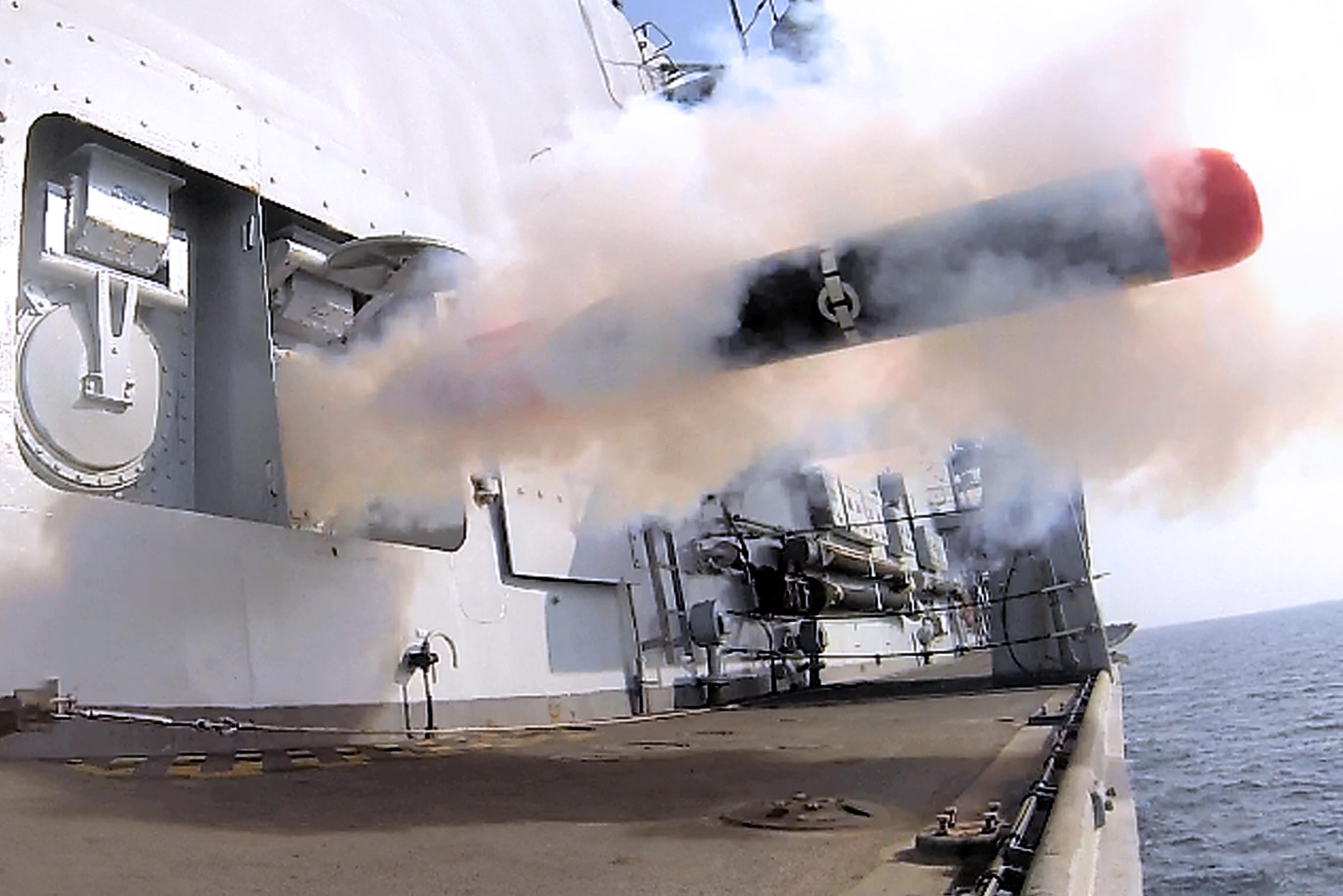
- HMS Westminster fires a Sting Ray Training Variant Torpedo from the tubes adjacent to her hangar
- Type: Lightweight ASW torpedo
- Place of origin: United Kingdom

Service history
- In service: 1982–present
- Used by: Royal Navy; Royal Norwegian Navy; Royal Thai Navy; Romanian Navy

Production history
- Designed: 1969–80
- Manufacturer: GEC-Marconi (Marconi Space and Defence Systems - MSDS), then Marconi Underwater Systems Ltd (MUSL) then BAE Systems Underwater Systems (part of BAE Systems Integrated System Technologies)

Specifications
- Mass: 267 kg (589 lb)
- Length: 2.6 meters or ( 8 feet 6 inches )
- Diameter: 330 mm (13 in)
- Maximum firing range: 8 to 11 km (8,700 to 12,000 yd)
- Warhead: Torpex
- Warhead weight: 45 kg (99 lb)
- Engine: Electrical pump-jet Magnesium/silver-chloride batteries
- Maximum speed: 45 kn (83 km/h)
- Guidance system: Active and passive sonar
- Launch platform: Frigates, destroyers, helicopters, Nimrod and P-8 Poseidon aircraft

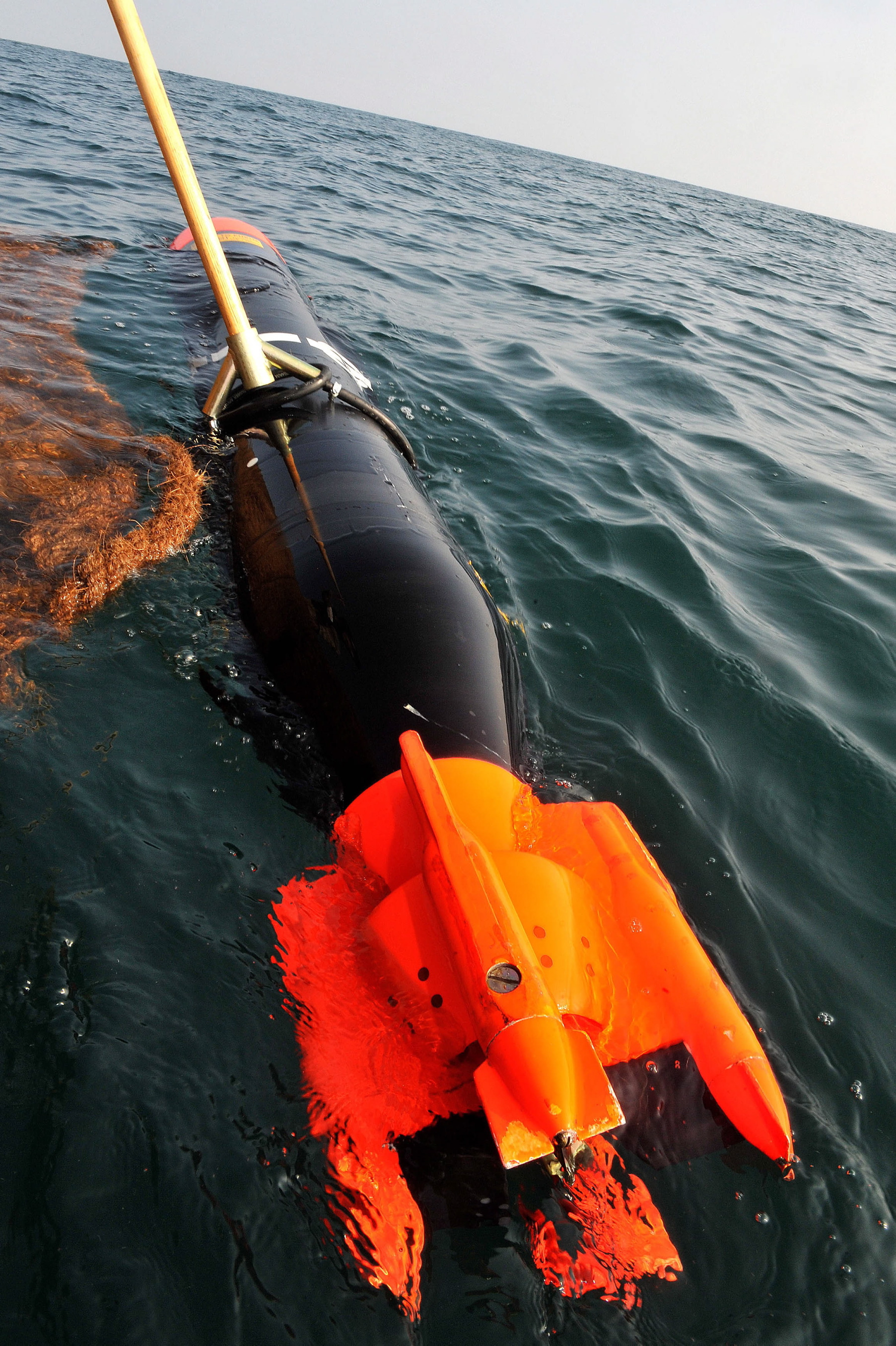
Ship-launched training variant

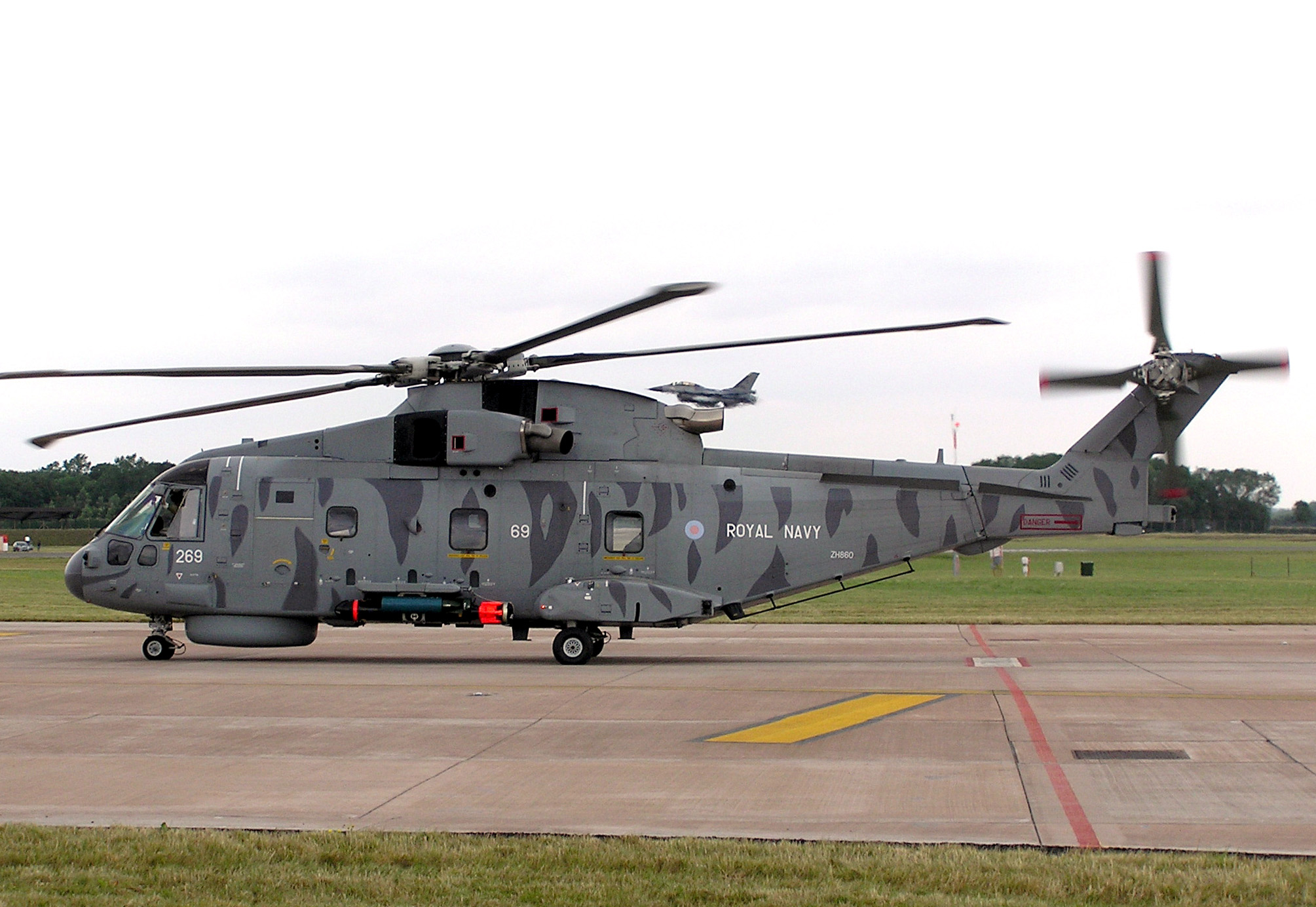
A Merlin HM1 loaded with a Sting Ray torpedo

The Sting Ray is a British acoustic homing lightweight torpedo (LWT) manufactured by GEC-Marconi, who later evolved into BAE Systems. It entered service in 1982.

== Design and development ==
In the 1950s the Royal Navy was equipped with British designed and built Mk 30 air-dropped torpedoes. These were passive homing weapons which relied on detecting the noise from submarine targets. However, as submarine noise levels decreased these weapons became ineffective. A design for a British Mk 31 torpedo which would have used active echo-location sonar failed to receive Government approval for production. US Mark 44 torpedoes were purchased for the Royal Navy in the 1960s to fill this role, and later replaced by US Mark 46 torpedoes.

A desire not to be dependent on US torpedo purchases led to a research programme starting in 1964 to develop a British torpedo. Initially designated Naval and Air Staff Requirement (NASR) 7511, it was (much later in the late 1970s) designated the Sting Ray torpedo.

=== Design ===
Design studies in the mid-1960s proposed that a tank of polyethylene oxide be carried behind the warhead. This polymer would be exuded at the nose to reduce the drag coefficient. Experiments using buoyancy-propelled torpedoes in 1969 had shown reductions in the drag coefficient up to 25%. However, by 1969 this scheme had been rejected in favour of carrying a larger battery.

The homing system developed in the mid-1960s incorporated a spinning magnetic disc onto which the acoustic correlation algorithms were etched but this was replaced by integrated circuit technology when the disc sometimes failed to survive the impact of the weapon with the sea from high altitude launches.

The original warhead concept was for a simple omnidirectional blast charge. However, studies in the 1970s showed that this would be inadequate against the large double-hulled submarines then entering service. A directed energy (shaped charge) warhead was used in the production weapon.

In 1976 the designs had to be completely revised. Swapping the project for buying a ready-made US torpedo was not considered because the torpedo was expected to be better, and was all-British.

=== Manufacture ===
The torpedo was built at the MSDS (later MUSL) plants at Neston (in Cheshire) and MUSL in Farlington and Waterlooville near Portsmouth. Guidance systems were made by Sperry Gyroscope Company.

== Deployment ==
The original in-service version (Sting Ray Mod 0) is officially documented as entering service in 1983, although Higgitt states that operational Sting Rays were loaded onto HMS Ardent under conditions of great secrecy immediately prior to sailing for the Falklands on 19 April 1982; Blackman's history of the Nimrod also states that the aircraft flying from Ascension Island in 1982 were equipped with the weapon.

Sting Ray is propelled by a pump jet driven by an electric motor. Power is supplied by a magnesium/silver-chloride sea water battery. The propulsion method combines high speed, deep diving, agility and low noise levels. The weapon is provided with target and environmental information by the launching platform. Once launched it operates autonomously, with tactical software searching for the target using active sonar and then homing in without any further assistance. The software is designed to deal with the employment of countermeasures by the target. The weapon is designed to be launched from fixed wing or rotary winged aircraft and surface ships against submarine targets.

The development of the torpedo cost £920 million. The Mark 24 Tigerfish submarine-launched torpedo had also overshot its initial budget.

== Operators ==
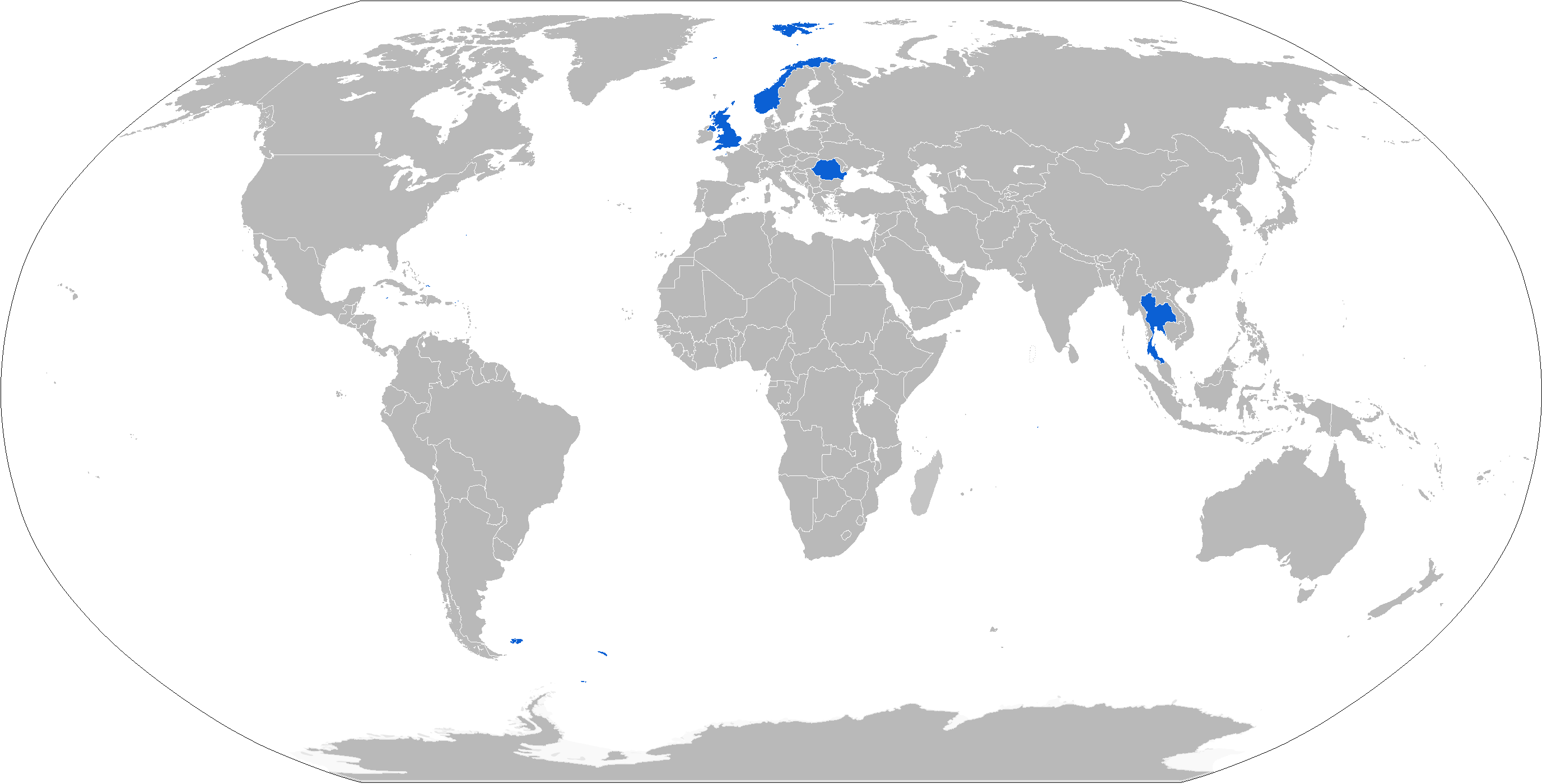
Map with Sting Ray operators in blue

=== Current operators ===
Egypt

- Egyptian Navy

United Kingdom

- Royal Navy
- Royal Air Force (being integrated on the P-8 Poseidon)

Norway

- Royal Norwegian Navy

Thailand

- Royal Thai Navy

Romania

- Romanian Navy

Morocco

- Royal Moroccan Navy

=== Future operators ===
Germany

- German Navy

== Specifications ==
- Length: 2.6 m (8.5 ft)
- Diameter: 330 mm (13 in)
- Weight: 267 kg (589 lb)
- Warhead: 45 kg (99 lb) of HE in a shaped charge
- Speed: 45 kn (83 km/h)
- Range: 8 to 11 km (8,700 to 12,000 yd)
- Depth: 800 m (2,600 ft)
- Propulsion: Magnesium/silver chloride seawater battery (Pump-jet)
- Guidance Active/Passive sonar

=== Dimensions ===
Sting Ray has a diameter of 330 mm (13 in) and a length of around 2.6 metres (8.5 feet). It has a launch weight of 267 kg (589 lb), and carries a 45 kg (99 lb) Torpex warhead. It has a speed of 45 kn (83 km/h) over a range of 8,000 m (8,700 yd; 4.3 nmi). The increased diameter compared to the US/NATO standard of 324 mm (12.8 in), meant that RN ships equipped with STWS-1 torpedo tubes designed for the Mark 46 torpedo couldn't fire Sting Ray. Only ships fitted/refitted with the larger STWS-2 or Magazine Torpedo Weapon System can use it.

Sting Ray Mod 1 is intended for use against the same targets as Sting Ray Mod 0 but with an enhanced capability against small clad conventional submarines via a shaped-charge insensitive explosive warhead from TDW, and an improved shallow-water performance. It shares many hull components with the original weapon.{date=November 2025}}

== See also ==
- APR-3E torpedo - Russian equivalent
- A244-S - Italian equivalent
- Mark 54 Lightweight Torpedo - US Navy's equivalent
- MU90 Impact - French/Italian equivalent
- TAL Shyena - Indian equivalent
- Yu-7 torpedo - Chinese equivalent
- K745 Chung Sang Eo - South Korean equivalent
- Type 97 light weight torpedo (G-RX4) - Japanese equivalent
