= Mark 46 torpedo =

Lightweight antisubmarine torpedo

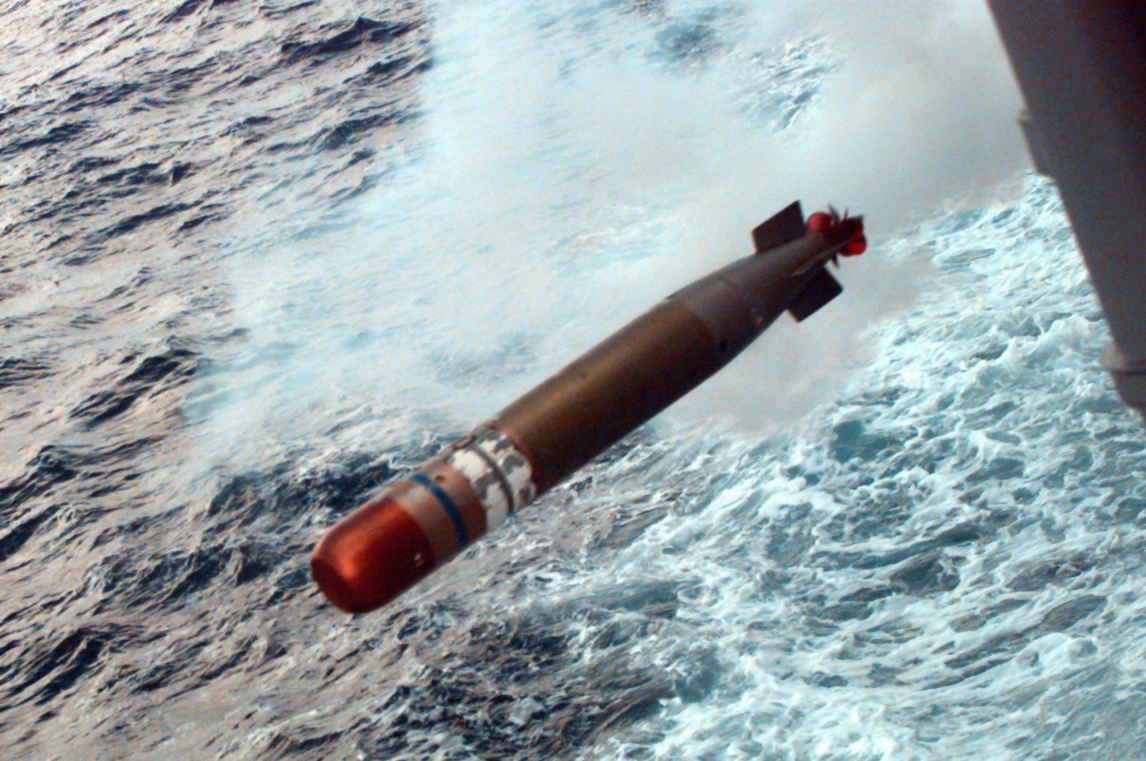
- A Mk 46 exercise torpedo launched from USS Moosbrugger.
- Type: Lightweight anti-submarine torpedo
- Place of origin: United States

Service history
- In service: • Mod 0: 1963 • Mod 5: 1979
- Used by: See operators

Production history
- Designer: Naval Ordnance Test Station Pasadena; Aerojet; Alliant Techsystems
- Designed: 1960
- Manufacturer: Aerojet; Naval Ordnance Station Forest Park; Honeywell; Raytheon
- Variants: Mod 0 Mod 1 Mod 2 Mod 5 Mod 5A; Mod 5A(S); Mod 5A(SW)

Specifications
- Mass: 508 lb (230 kg)
- Length: 8 ft 6 in (2.59 m)
- Diameter: 12.75 in (323.8 mm)
- Warhead: PBXN-103 high explosive (bulk charge)
- Warhead weight: 96.8 lb (43.9 kg)
- Engine: Two-speed, reciprocating external combustion
- Propellant: Otto fuel II
- Operational range: 12,000 yd (11,000 m)
- Maximum depth: >1,200 ft (370 m)
- Maximum speed: >40 kn (74 km/h; 46 mph)
- Guidance system: Active or passive/active acoustic homing
- Launch platform: Mark 32 Surface Vessel Torpedo Tubes, ASW Aircraft, RUM-139 VL-ASROC

The Mark 46 torpedo is the backbone of the United States Navy's lightweight anti-submarine warfare torpedo inventory and is the NATO standard. These aerial torpedoes are designed to attack high-performance submarines. In 1989, an improvement program for the Mod 5 to the Mod 5A and Mod 5A(S) increased its shallow-water performance. The Mark 46 was initially developed as Research Torpedo Concept I (RETORC I), one of several weapons recommended for implementation by Project Nobska, a 1956 summer study on submarine warfare.

== Design details ==
=== Variants ===
- Mod 0: One of the original versions of 1960 (production started 1963). Solid propellent piston engine. Gyro/wire guidance with passive/active homing.
- Mod 1: Based on Mod 0. 1967. Uses liquid Otto fuel piston engine. Laminar search guidance. Phase 1 of 1968 uses stronger hull to resist deeper waters. Phase 2 of 1971 uses a new homing program able to detect submarines near the surface.
- Mod 2: Based on Mod 1 phase 2. More powerful Mk 103 Mod 1 warhead. Improved computer with snake search pattern capability. Known to have been captured by China in 1978.
- Mod 4: Version for use as Mark 60 CAPTOR mine payload.
- Mod 5: 1979 upgrade kit for Mod 2, also known as NEARTIP (near-term improvement program). New passive/active sonar, liquid fuel and two speed engine for low speed search and high speed attack.
  - Mod 5A: Cheaper NEARTIP upgrade kit for Mod 1 and Mod 2 with improved shallow-water performance. 1980s.
  - Mod 5A(S): Variant of 5A that allows use in water as shallow as 40 m.
  - Mod 5A(SW): Latest variant from 1996 Service Life Extension Program. Boasts improved counter-countermeasure performance, enhanced target acquisition, provides a bottom-avoidance preset, and improved maintainability and reliability.
- Mod 6: Version for Mark 60 CAPTOR, with some NEARTIP components.
- Mod 7: canceled. Not funded by Congress.

For most variants there is also an inert REXTORP (recoverable exercise torpedo) version.

=== Specifications ===
Mark 46, Mod 5

- Primary Function: Air and ship-launched lightweight torpedo
- Contractor: Alliant Techsystems
- Power Plant: Two-speed, reciprocating external combustion; Mono-propellant (Otto fuel II)
- Length: 8 ft 6 in (2.59 m) tube launch configuration (from ship), 14 ft 9 in (4.50 m) with ASROC rocket booster
- Weight: 508 lb (230 kg) (warshot configuration)
- Diameter: 12.75 in (324 mm)
- Range: 12,000 yd (11,000 m)
- Depth: > 1,200 ft (370 m)
- Speed: > 40 kn (74 km/h; 46 mph)
- Guidance System: Homing mode: Active or passive/active acoustic homing
- Launch/search mode: Snake or circle search
- Warhead: 96.8 lb (43.9 kg) of PBXN-103 high explosive (bulk charge)
- Date Deployed: 1967 (Mod 0); 1979 (Mod 5)

== Yu-7 variant ==
The Chinese Yu-7 torpedo is said to be based on the Mk 46 Mod 2. The Chinese Navy used the Yu-7 ASW torpedo, deployed primarily on ships and ASW helicopters, but it started to be replaced by the Yu-11 in 2012.

== Operators ==
- Australia
- Bahrain
- Belgium
- Brazil
- Canada
- Chile
- Colombia
- Croatia
- Ecuador
- Egypt
- France
- Germany
- Greece
- Indonesia
- Iran
- Israel
- Italy
- Japan
- Kuwait
- Mexico
- Morocco
- Netherlands
- New Zealand
- Norway
- Pakistan
- Peru
- Philippines
- Portugal
- Saudi Arabia
- South Korea
- Spain
- Taiwan
- Thailand
- Turkey
- United Arab Emirates
- United Kingdom
- United States

== Gallery ==
A Mark 46 Mod 5A torpedo is inspected aboard the guided missile destroyer USS Mustin.

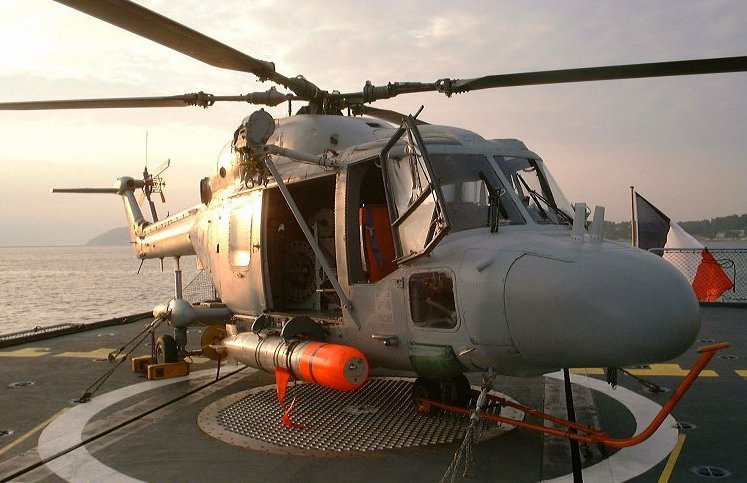
A French Lynx helicopter carrying a Mk 46 torpedo.

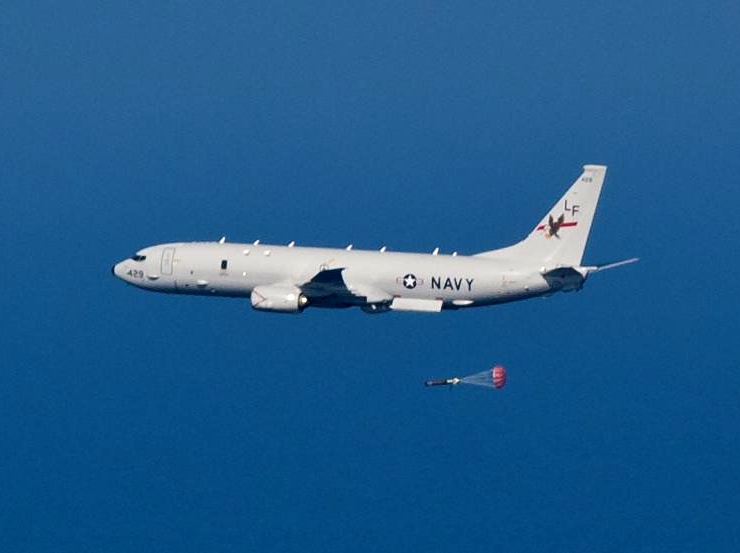
A P-8A Poseidon of VP-16 dropping a Mark 46 torpedo

== See also ==
- Advanced Light Torpedo Shyena
- CAPTOR mine (a sea mine which incorporates a Mk 46 torpedo)
- MU90 Impact torpedo
- Mark 50 torpedo
- Mark 54 MAKO Lightweight Torpedo
- Stingray torpedo
