= Torpedo Advanced Light Shyena =

Shyena
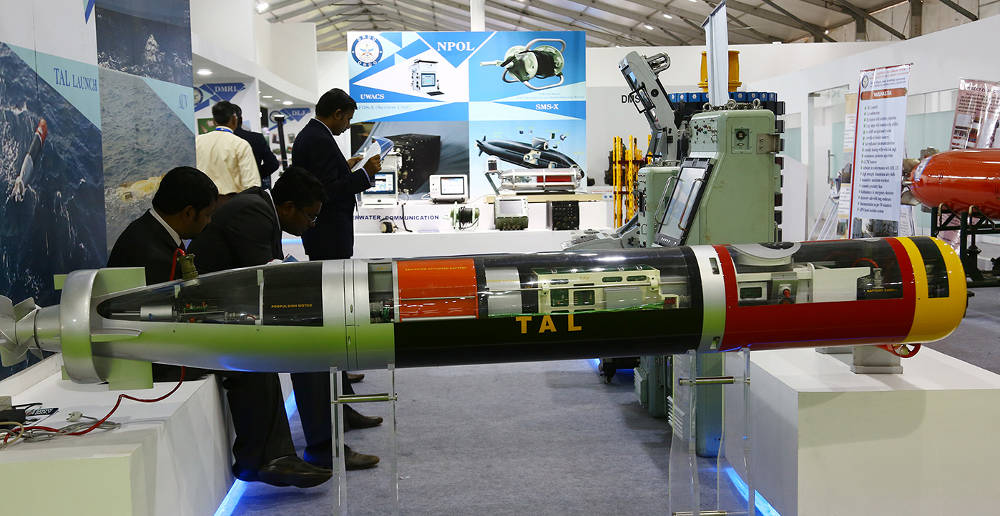
- Advanced Light Torpedo Shyena
- Type: Lightweight ASW torpedo
- Place of origin: India

Service history
- Used by: See Operators

Production history
- Designer: Naval Science and Technological Laboratory
- Manufacturer: Bharat Dynamics Limited; Larsen & Toubro
- Produced: March 2012 – present
- No. built: 2,000+

Specifications
- Mass: 220 kg (490 lb)
- Length: 2.75 m (9.0 ft)
- Diameter: 324 mm (12.8 in)
- Warhead: High explosive
- Warhead weight: 50 kg (110 lb)
- Engine: Electric
- Operational range: 19 km (10 nmi)
- Maximum depth: >450 m (>1,480 ft)
- Maximum speed: 45+ knots (83+ km/h, 50+ mp/h)
- Guidance system: Acoustic homing (active/passive)
- Launch platform: Ships, helicopters

The Torpedo Advanced Light (TAL) Shyena (Sanskrit: श्येन, "Falcon or Hawk") is the first indigenous advanced lightweight anti-submarine torpedo of India, developed by the Naval Science and Technological Laboratory (NSTL) of the Defence Research and Development Organisation (DRDO) for the Indian Navy. The lightweight torpedo can be launched by ships, helicopters and previously the now retired Ilyushin Il-38, named after the divine hawk identified with Agni.

Shyena also utilizes SMART missile as long-range delivery platform.

== Introduction ==
Shyena is a processor-based torpedo which incorporates solid-state electronics, digital technology and has been equipped with an integrated active/passive sensors for homing. It is capable of being launched from a helicopter or surface vessels. Its key design feature are maneuverability and ability to transition from warm to cold medium to ensure a hunt and kill. The development period of the torpedo was quite long, starting in the 1990s, and concluding with its induction into the Indian Navy on 3 March 2012. On that date, the Defence Minister A.K. Antony handed over the first consignment of TAL to the Navy in Hyderabad.

== Design and development ==
Development of this missile was started by the Naval Science and Technological Laboratory (NSTL) in 1990s, under the Advanced Experimental Torpedo (TAE) program. It is an advanced capability torpedo and is heavily based on the Whitehead A244-S torpedo. NSTL had faced a difficult task of developing a torpedo which could sustain its efficiency, in particular the maneuverability and structural integrity while travelling from the air medium to water after being launched from the air. The computers perform their respective tasks, which are the successful launch of the torpedo, the homing of the target and its control and finally the recording of the data for analysis.

Shyena is electrically propelled, and can target submarines with a speed of 33 knots with endurance of six minutes in both shallow and deep waters. It can operate at depths of a few hundred metres and has self-homing, i.e. it can home in on targets by passive/active homing and explode on impact. Once launched, it can perform pre-programmed search patterns for available targets. The torpedo weighs around 220 kg.

== Deployment ==
By 1998, Shyena was ready for trials, and it was tested 24 times by the NSTL from 1998 to 2000. During trials, thrust was laid on monitoring of various factors through four computers fitted on board Shyena. User evaluation tests with designed and engineered models of the TAL took place in 2003–2005. The tests convinced the Navy of the system's capabilities. Ninety-five per cent of the components were indigenous except a few integrated circuits and sensors. The Navy ordered 25 units, and was considered likely to order more. The TAL is currently being manufactured by Bharat Dynamics Limited at its Visakhapatnam unit.

On 8 March 2021, the Indian Navy successfully conducted Shyena's maiden flight trial with a parachute system from the Ilyushin Il-38 maritime patrol aircraft. While NSTL developed the Torpedo Release Mechanism (TRM) and Fire Control System (FCS) for the launch, the parachute which would deployed on its way to descent to the water by the TRM was developed by the Aerial Delivery Research and Development Establishment (ADRDE).

== Advanced Light-Weight Torpedo (ALWT) ==
Advanced Light-Weight Torpedo (ALWT) is the 2nd generation of Shyena anti-submarine torpedo. The torpedo is developed by Naval Science and Technological Laboratory (NSTL). It can be launched from ship, helicopter or from a fixed wing aircraft. Based on inputs from the platform's sonar and Fire Control System inputs, certain preset parameters are given to the torpedo prior to launch in order to ensure the target is in a favourable position to acquire, home in and destroy the it. The torpedo boasts a dual-speed capability for which it has a range of 25 km (16 mi) at 25 kn (46 km/h) and a range of 12 km (7.5 mi) at 50 kn (93 km/h). It uses sea-water powered battery which eliminates the requirement of pre-launch charging. The ALWT will also form the warhead of the SMART anti-submarine missile along with a parachute-based release system. The torpedo is meant to replace Mark 46 torpedo in the Indian Navy's inventory. The torpedo will also be integrated on the Boeing P-8I Neptune fleet of the Indian Navy for anti-submarine warfare operations.

In March 2020, two dynamic trials including homing and guidance logics was conducted. ALWT had consistently achieved satisfactory homing range including 3 steer away with increased target range & reduced target strength. On 2 May 2023, the Navy and NSTL undertook a hover drop test of the ALWT from a Sea King 42B. The objectives of the trials, safe release & separation, was achieved. As of July 2024, the ALWT had reportedly completed all its user trials.

By 22 September 2025, the procurement of the torpedoes was cleared by the Defence Procurement Board, chaired by the Defence Secretary, and has now been forwarded to the Defence Acquisition Council (DAC), chaired by the Defence Minister, for further discussion and evaluation of the project. Both of the development and user trials by the Indian Navy has been concluded. If the Acceptance of Necessity (AoN) is cleared by the DAC, the project will proceed to serial production stage likely to be undertaken by Bharat Dynamics Limited.

The project was cleared by the DAC on 23 October 2025.

== Exports ==
In March 2017, India signed a $37.9 million deal to supply Shyena to the Myanmar Navy. The first batch of 20 torpedoes were delivered in July 2019.

BDL signed a third and fourth export contract for the Shyena torpedo in 2019 to an undisclosed friendly country. The value of the contract is ₹455.27 crore (equivalent to ₹566 crore or US$59 million in 2023) and ₹1.43 crore (equivalent to ₹1.6 crore or US$170,000 in 2023) respectively. The order is planned to be executed in 2020–21.

BDL has signed a total of 5 export orders for Shyena torpedoes to an undisclosed friendly country(s). Four orders has been successfully delivered while the fifth one is under execution in 2021–22.

== Operators ==
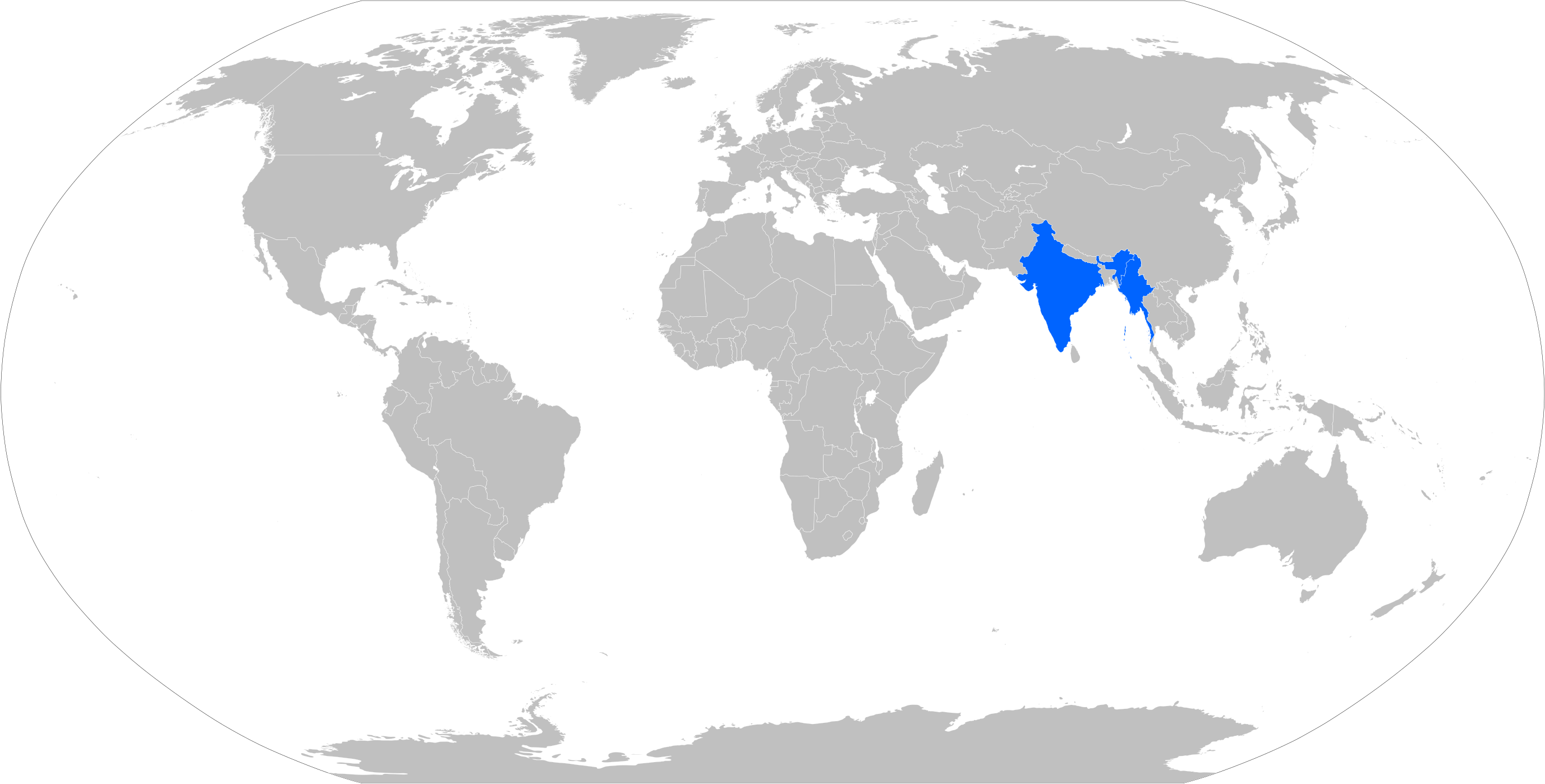
Map of Shyena torpedo operators in blue

India

- Indian Navy

Myanmar

- Myanmar Navy
  - Kyan Sittha-class frigate
  - Anawrahta-class corvette
  - Yan Nyein Aung-class submarine chaser

== Coverage ==
In his book "Naval Institute Guide to Combat Fleets of the World: Their Ships, Aircraft, and Systems", Eric Wertheim has described the Shyena as an up-and-coming torpedo developed by the DRDO.

Pursuit and Promotion of Science, a report published by Indian National Science Academy mentions Shyena as an advanced experimental torpedo.

== See also ==
- APR-3E torpedo – Russian equivalent
- A244-S – Italian equivalent
- Mark 54 Lightweight Torpedo – US Navy's equivalent
- MU90 Impact – French/Italian equivalent
- Sting Ray (torpedo) – British equivalent
- Yu-7 torpedo – Chinese equivalent
- K745 Chung Sang Eo – South Korean equivalent
- Type 97 light weight torpedo (G-RX4) – Japanese equivalent
