= Mark 54 lightweight torpedo =

American torpedo

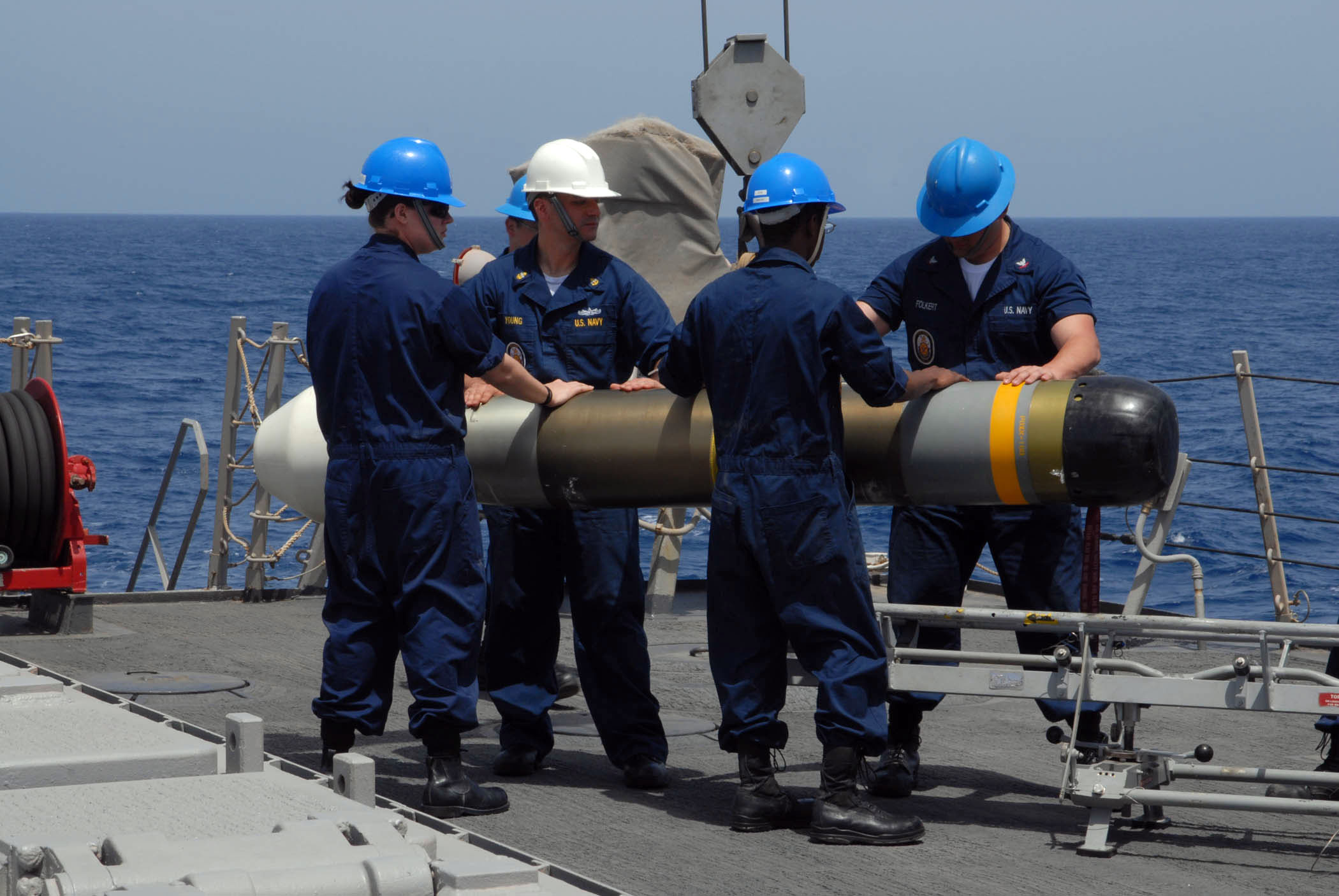
- Mark 54 torpedo aboard USS Ross in March 2008.
- Type: Lightweight ASW torpedo
- Place of origin: United States

Service history
- In service: 2004–present
- Used by: United States Navy; Royal Australian Navy; Royal Canadian Navy; Royal Air Force; Royal Netherlands Navy; Republic of China Navy

Production history
- Designer: Raytheon Systems
- Designed: 1999
- Unit cost: US$839,320 (FY2014)
- Produced: 2003

Specifications
- Mass: 608 lb (276 kg)
- Length: 8 ft 10.9 in or 106.9 in (2.72 m)
- Diameter: 12.75 in (324 mm)
- Warhead: PBXN-103
- Warhead weight: 96.8 lb (43.9 kg)
- Blast yield: 238 lb (108 kg) TNT
- Engine: Reciprocating external combustion
- Propellant: Otto II (liquid)
- Operational range: 10,000 yd (9.1 km)
- Maximum depth: >450 metres (1,480 ft) (estimate)
- Maximum speed: >40 kn (74.1 km/h; 46.0 mph)
- Guidance system: Active or passive/active acoustic homing
- Launch platform: Mark 32 Surface Vessel Torpedo Tubes, ASW Aircraft, RUM-139 VL-ASROC

The Mark 54 lightweight torpedo (formerly known as lightweight hybrid torpedo, or LHT) is a standard 12.75-inch (324 mm) anti-submarine warfare (ASW) torpedo used by the United States Navy and several other nations' armed forces.

== Development ==
The Mark 54 was co-developed by Raytheon Integrated Defense Systems and the United States Navy (USN) under the USN's Lightweight Hybrid Torpedo program in response to perceived problems with the Mark 50 and Mark 46 torpedoes. The Mk 50, having been developed to counter very high performance nuclear submarines such as the Soviet Alfa class, was seen as too expensive to use against relatively slow conventional submarines. The older Mk 46, designed for open-ocean use, performed poorly in the littoral areas, where the USN envisioned itself likely to operate in the future.

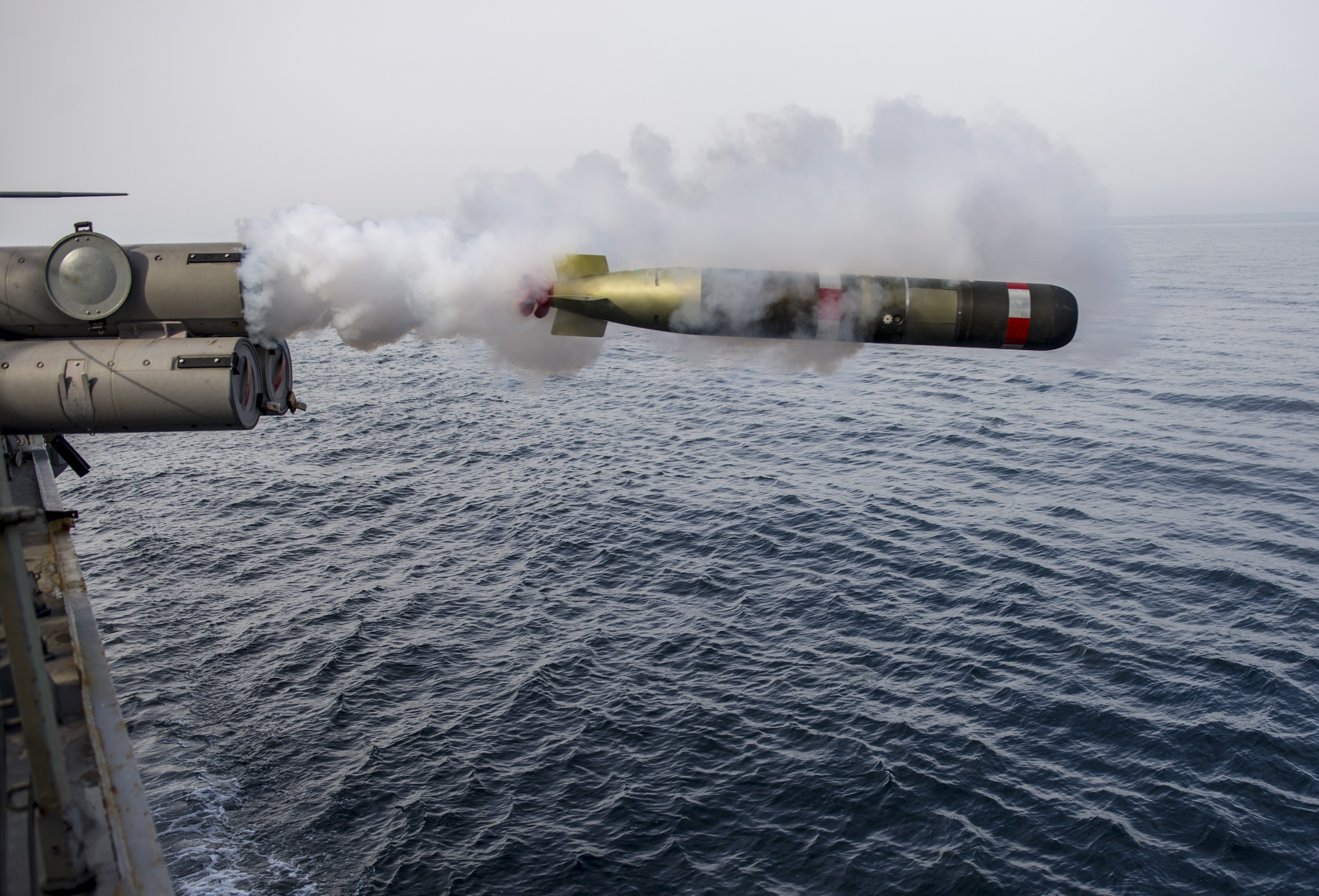
USS Roosevelt launches a Mk 54 torpedo.

The Mk 54 was created by combining the homing portion of the Mk 50 and the warhead and propulsion sections of the Mk 46, improved for better performance in shallow water, and with the addition of commercial off-the-shelf (COTS) technology to further reduce costs. It shares much of the software and computer hardware of the Mk 48 ADCAP heavy torpedo, based on a custom PowerPC 603e microprocessor. Developmental testing began in July 1999, and a successful critical design review was completed in November 1999.

In April 2003, Raytheon was awarded a sole source contract for the production of the Mk 54. Full rate production began in October 2004. In March 2010 the United States Fifth Fleet requested improvements in the Mk 54's performance against diesel-electric submarines via an Urgent Operational Need Statement (UONS). This led to a software Block Upgrade (BUG) program which began testing in August 2011 and which continues, having been criticized by the Director, Operational Test and Evaluation (DOT&E) for using unrealistic proxies for threat submarines.

The Mk 54 can be fired from surface ships via the Mark 32 surface vessel torpedo tubes or the vertical launch anti-submarine rocket (VL-ASROC) systems, and also from most ASW aircraft, although they are slightly different lengths and weights. The P-8 Poseidon uses the High-Altitude Anti-Submarine Warfare Weapons Capability (HAAWC) GPS-guided glide kit to drop torpedoes from high altitude.

The FY14 DOT&E report assessed the Mk 54 (BUG) torpedo as not operationally effective in its intended role: "During operationally challenging and realistic scenarios, the Mk 54 (BUG) demonstrated below threshold performance and exhibited many of the same failure mechanisms observed during the FY 2004 initial operational testing". Shortfalls were also identified with the employing platforms’ tactics and tactical documentation, and interoperability problems with some platform fire control systems.

A new version designated Mk 54 Mod 1 Increment 1 was fielded in 2021. As of 2022, the Navy intended to begin operational tests of versions Mod 1 Increment 2 and Mod 2 in 2026 and 2027, respectively. Mod 1 contains updates to sonar and computing hardware, and is replacing Mod 0 in existing inventories.

== Operators ==
=== Current operators ===
Australia

- Royal Australian Navy - In October 2010, Australia ordered 200 more torpedoes.
- Royal Australian Air Force - The Mk54 Mod 0 is employed on the P-8A Poseidon by No. 11 Squadron RAAF.

Brazil

- Brazilian Navy - In December 2020, the US Department of State approved for $70 million, the sale for Brazil of 22 Mk 54 lightweight torpedo conversion kits for the Mk 46 Mod 5A torpedoes already in operation in the S-70B helicopters of the Brazilian Navy, plus ancillary training, exercise and maintenance spare parts.

Canada

- Royal Canadian Air Force
- Royal Canadian Navy

In May 2019 Canada requested 425 Mk 54 lightweight torpedo conversion kits, plus ancillary training, exercise and maintenance spare parts. This procurement will allow Canada to upgrade its current inventory of Mk 46 torpedoes. The Mk 54 lightweight torpedoes are expected to be used on the Royal Canadian Navy's Halifax-class frigates, and the Royal Canadian Air Force's CP-140 Aurora aircraft. The torpedoes are also planned to be deployed from the CH-148 maritime helicopters. On 17 May 2019, the U.S. State Department approved the sale worth US$387 million (C$514 million in 2019.) Under Canada's Industrial and Technological Benefits Policy, Canada negotiated an Offset agreement with Raytheon before signing the final deal in order to leverage jobs and economic benefits in Canada.

India

- Indian Navy - In June 2011, it was reported that India will get 32 Mk 54 All-Up-Round Lightweight Torpedoes and associated equipment, parts, training and logistical support for an estimated cost of $86 million through U.S. government's Foreign Military Sales program for P-8I LRMP. In April 2020, Defense Security Cooperation Agency cleared the possible sale of 16 aircraft-launched Mk 54 Lightweight Torpedo all up rounds and 3 Mk 54 Exercise Torpedoes for its additional P-8I fleet at a cost of $63 million. In October 2024, the United States' Defense Security Cooperation Agency cleared the possible sale of 53 aircraft-launched Mk 54 Mod 0 lightweight torpedo all up rounds for its MH-60R "Romeo" fleet and associated equipment and support, including "in-country torpedo training."

Mexico

- Mexican Navy - In early 2018 the U.S. State Department approved the sale of Mark 54 torpedoes to the Mexican Navy, who will deploy them from their new Sigma-class design frigates, the first of which is being jointly built with Dutch shipbuilding company Damen Schelde Naval Shipbuilding. In April 2018, the U. S. State Department cleared the sale of an additional 30 Mark 54 torpedoes to the Mexican Navy, which may be carried on MH-60R helicopters, which the Mexican Navy plans to order in the near future.

New Zealand

- Royal New Zealand Air Force - Have an undisclosed number with the purchase of the P-8A. It was known that the upgrade from the Mk 46 was going to happen via the "Defence Capability Plan 2019" and was stated in the RNZAF News that weapon was the Mark 54 torpedo. It is unknown whether the Royal New Zealand Navy have replaced their Mk46.
- 5th June 2026 U.S. Department of State has made a determination approving a possible Foreign Military Sale to the Government of New Zealand for 20 MK 54 Torpedoes and related equipment. The estimated cost is $69 million. As part of the MH-60R Multi-Mission Helicopters sale package.

Netherlands

- Royal Netherlands Navy - In 2018 the Royal Netherlands Navy acquired Mk 54 torpedoes via the Foreign Military Sales process.

Norway

- Royal Norwegian Air Force - Acquiring 50 RTX Mk 54 Mod 0 lightweight torpedoes from USA for its American made aircraft.

United Kingdom

- Royal Air Force - In January 2018 it was announced that the P-8 Poseidon aircraft to be operated by the Royal Air Force will carry the Mk 54. However in 2023 it was announced these would be supplemented by integration of the higher performance Sting Ray on to the Poseidon

United States

- United States Navy

Germany

- German Navy - In 2020 it was announced that the German Navy ordered 64 weapons for use with its P-8A Poseidon aircraft.

=== Future operators ===
Republic of China

- Republic of China Navy - In 2017 168 Mk 54 torpedo upgrade kits were approved for sale along with supporting technical support. However due to incomplete delivery no torpedo has been upgraded yet as of 2026.

== See also ==
- APR-3E torpedo - Russian equivalent
- A244-S - Italian equivalent (especially the Mk3 variant with a MU90 seeker)
- MU90 Impact - French/Italian equivalent
- Sting Ray (torpedo) - British equivalent
- TAL Shyena - Indian equivalent
- Yu-11 torpedo - Chinese equivalent
- K745 Chung Sang Eo - South Korean equivalent
- Type 97 light weight torpedo (G-RX4) - Japanese equivalent
- Torped 47 — Swedish equivalent
- Copperhead-100M, an autonomous unmanned undersea loitering munition comparable in size and capability to the Mark 54.
