= Type 97 light weight torpedo (G-RX4) =

Type 97
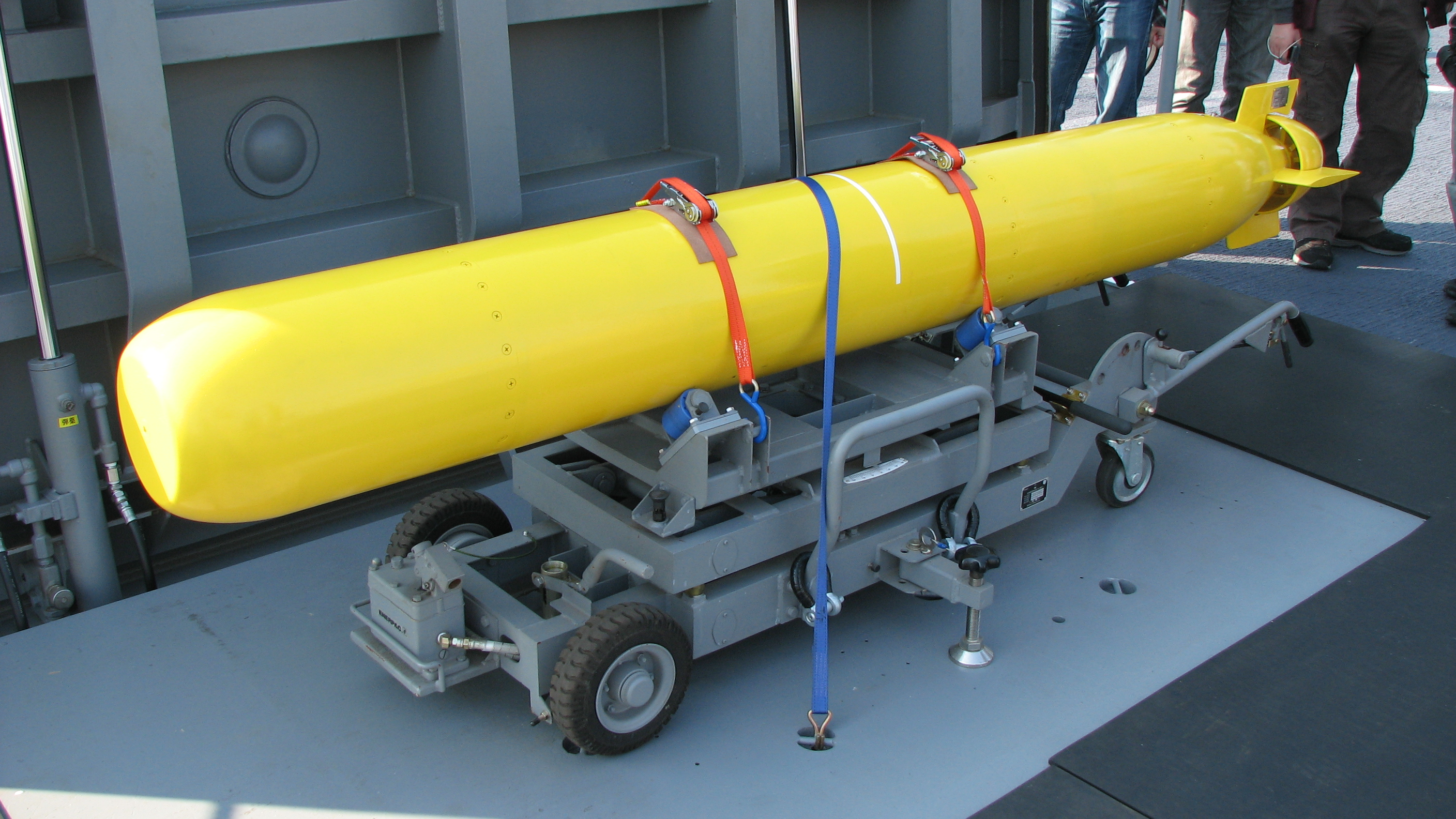
- Type: Lightweight ASW torpedo
- Place of origin: Japan

Service history
- In service: 1997 to present
- Used by: Japan Maritime Self-Defense Force

Production history
- Manufacturer: Mitsubishi Heavy Industries

Specifications
- Mass: 320 kg
- Length: 2.832 mm
- Diameter: 324 mm
- Engine: Closed-cycle turbine
- Propellant: sulfur hexafluoride, lithium
- Guidance system: Acoustic
- Launch platform: Aircraft, ships

The Type 97 Torpedo (97式短魚雷, 97 Shiki Tan Gyorai) is a short-range torpedo developed and built by the Mitsubishi Heavy Industries for the Japanese Maritime Self Defense Force. This type of torpedo, like many other modern Japanese weapons systems, is not exported.

== Development ==
At the end of the Cold War, Soviet attack submarines were capable of moving at higher speed and diving at lower depth. Less ability to deal with them led to the need to develop a new type of torpedo.

In 1989 a new torpedo project by Japan, G-RX4, was launched to make the necessary upgrades and start developing prototypes. By 1997 the new torpedo was approved and put into service and is called the Type 97. The torpedo is now equipping the JMSDF P-1 and P-3 ASW aircraft as well as filling the Mark 32 torpedo tubes on surface ships.

== See also ==
- APR-3E torpedo - Russian equivalent
- A244-S - Italian equivalent
- Mark 54 Lightweight Torpedo - US Navy's equivalent
- MU90 Impact - French/Italian equivalent
- TAL Shyena - Indian equivalent
- Yu-7 torpedo - Chinese equivalent
- K745 Blue Shark - South Korean equivalent
- Sting Ray (torpedo) - British equivalent
