= Yu-7 torpedo =

- Type: Lightweight ASW torpedo
- Place of origin: People's Republic of China

Service history
- In service: Early 1990s
- Used by: People's Liberation Army Navy

Production history
- Designer: China Shipbuilding Industry Corporation
- Designed: 1980s

Specifications
- Mass: 235 kg (518 lb)
- Length: 2.7 m (8.9 ft)
- Diameter: 324 mm (12.8 in)
- Effective firing range: 14.1 km (7.6 nmi)
- Warhead: high explosive
- Warhead weight: 45 kg (99 lb) shaped charge
- Propellant: Otto fuel II
- Maximum depth: 400 m (1,300 ft)
- Maximum speed: >45 kn (83 km/h)
- Guidance system: active / passive acoustic homing
- Steering system: CIACIO-S seeker
- Launch platform: Surface ships Helicopters

The Yu-7 (Chinese: 鱼-7; pinyin: yú-7; lit. 'fish 7'; from Chinese: 鱼雷; lit. 'fish bomb', meaning ‘torpedo’) is a lightweight torpedo developed by the People's Republic of China. It entered service in the 1990s as the principal anti-submarine weapon of major People's Liberation Army Navy (PLAN) warships. The Yu-7 is a derivative of the Italian WASS A244/S torpedo.

== Development ==
Development of an effective lightweight anti-submarine (ASW) torpedo for the PLAN began in the 1980s. The program was probably based on 40 A244/S torpedoes purchased for evaluation from Italy in 1987. Additional technology may have been reverse engineered from a United States Mark 46 Mod 2 torpedo recovered from the South China Sea in 1978 by Chinese fishermen. Development was carried out by the 705th Institute (also known as Xi'an Precision Machinery Research Institute, 西安精密机械研究所). The torpedo was initially equipped with electric propulsion, but inadequate performance led to a redesign powered by Otto fuel II. Testing was carried out at the 750 Testing Range in Kunming up to 1988.

One Chinese source alleges that during the intense technology cooperation between the China and the US in the 1980s, a plan was made to license-produce the Mk 46 Mod 2 in China, though it was not completed due to its steep price. Nevertheless, Chinese personnel visited the torpedo-producing facilities at Honeywell, watched the testing of Mk 46 Mod 5 torpedoes, and signed a 1985 contract for China to purchase four completed Mk 46 Mod 2 torpedoes, a maintenance facility, and technical documents. The same source claims that China has also studied the Mark 32 surface vessel torpedo tubes on a Pakistani frigate.

== Description ==
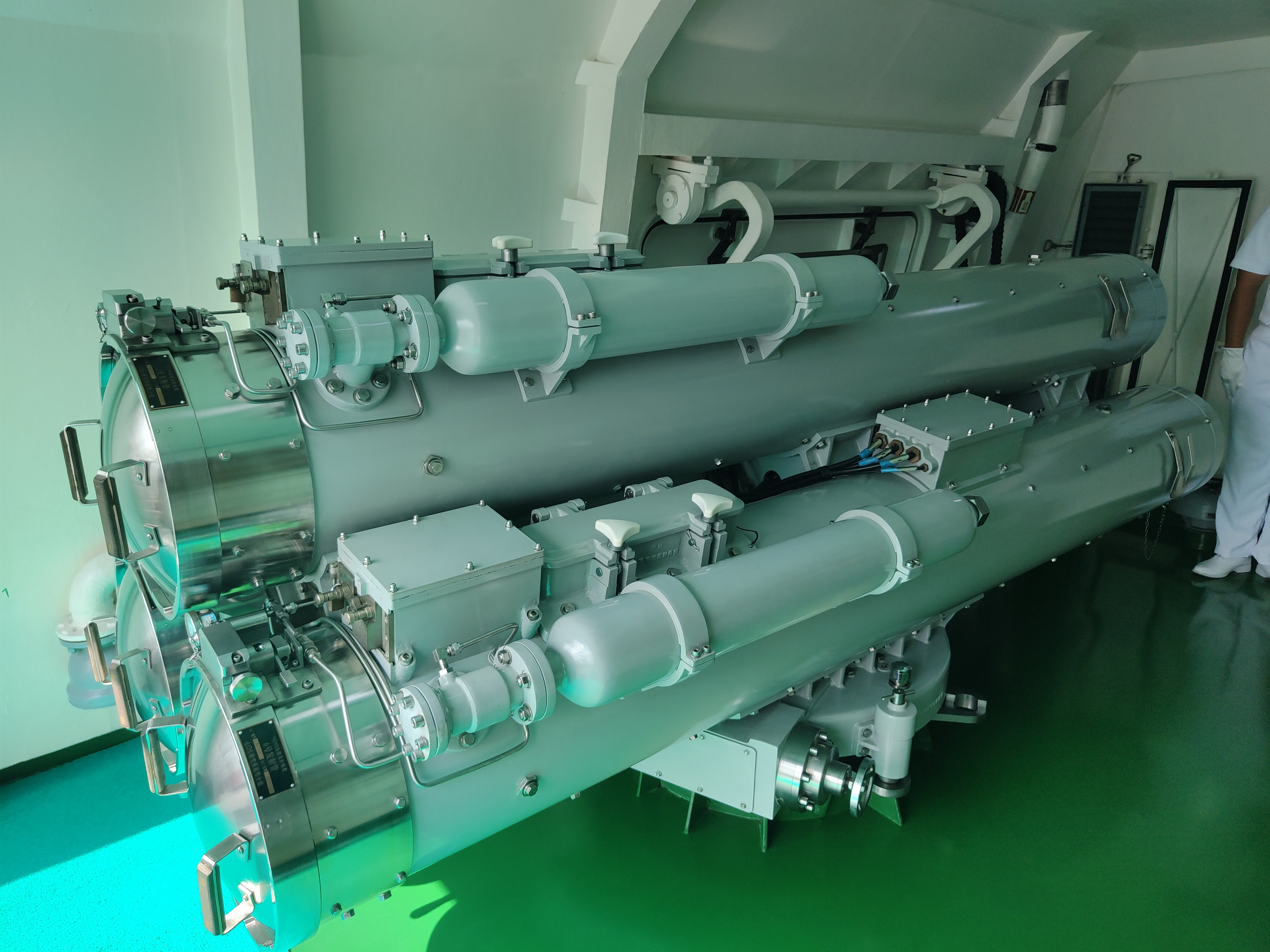
Type 7424 torpedo launchers

The Yu-7 has counter-rotating propellers. Aboard surface warships, it is fired from Type 7424 triple 324 mm torpedo launchers; these are copies or derivatives of the WASS B515/ILAS-3.

== Deployment ==
The Yu-7 entered service in the early 1990s.

== Export variant ==
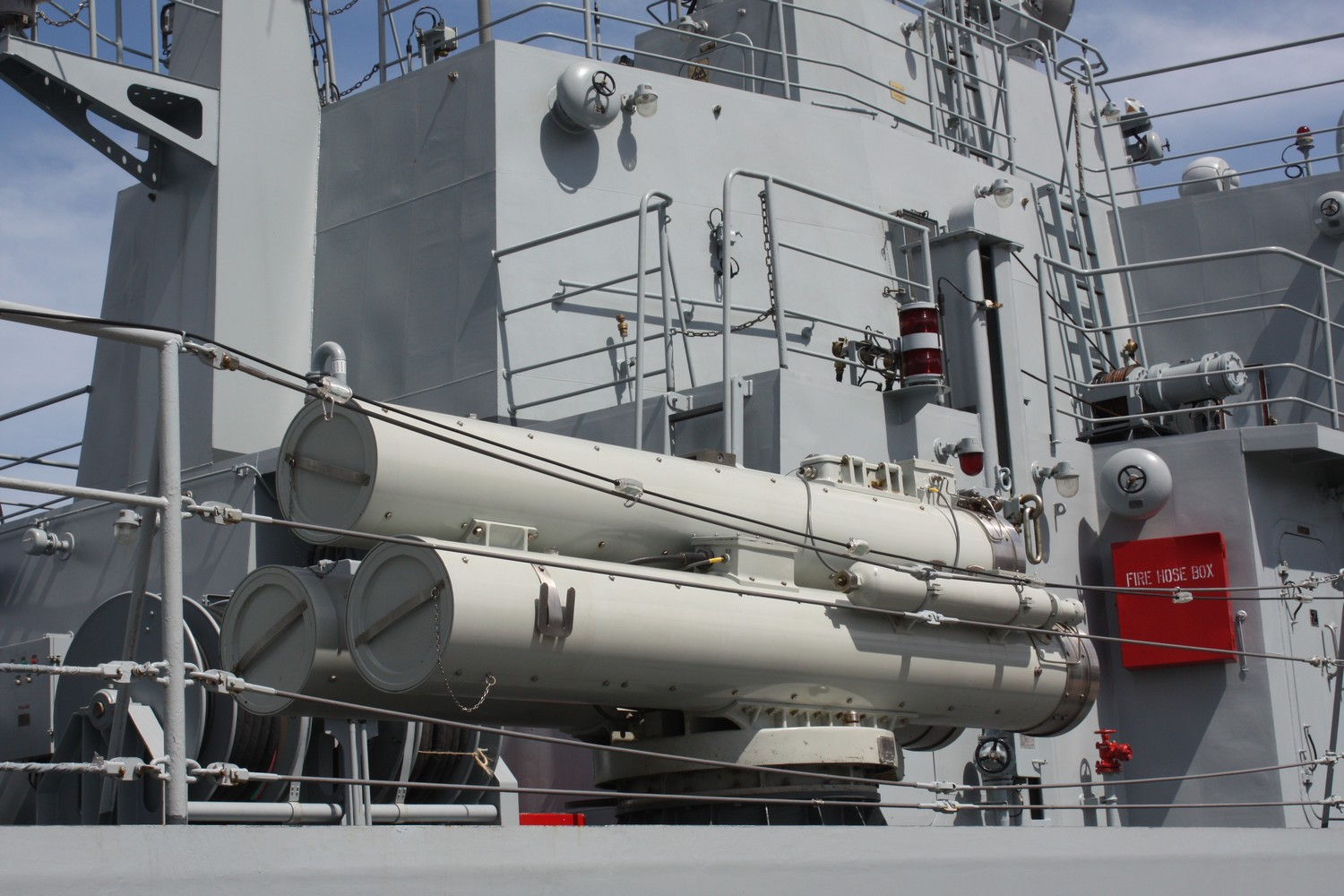
ET-52C torpedoes mounted on the PNS Zulfiquar frigate. Picture taken during the ship's goodwill visit to Malaysia in August 2009.

The ET52 is an export version of Yu-7. It shares most of the developmental heritage including the A244/S and the Mk 46 Mod 2, but is most notably different in its propulsion mechanism: a single propeller driven by electric power. Variants that have appeared in text include ET52C and ET52E.

Although the electric torpedo has reduced range, it's reportedly only 1/2 to 1/3 the price of a Otto fuel II torpedo.

== Yu-11 ==
The Yu-11 (Chinese: 鱼-11; pinyin: yú-11; lit. 'fish 11') is the successor to the Yu-7. It was first publicly identified in July 2015. The major improvement appears to be its pump-jet propulsion. The Yu-11 torpedo is quieter and may potentially operate at depths greater than 600 metres. The Yu-11 is longer, at three metres, and heavier than the Yu-7.

The Yu-11 is likely to become the standard PLAN lightweight torpedo and may have started equipping modern PLAN warships since 2012.

== See also ==
- Export torpedoes of China
- APR-3E torpedo - Russian equivalent
- A244-S - Italian equivalent
- Mark 54 Lightweight Torpedo - US Navy's equivalent
- MU90 Impact - French/Italian equivalent
- Sting Ray (torpedo) - British equivalent
- TAL Shyena - Indian equivalent
- K745 Chung Sang Eo - South Korean equivalent
- Type 97 light weight torpedo (G-RX4) - Japanese equivalent
