= WASS Submarine Systems =

Italian arms manufacturer

WASS Submarine Systems S.r.l.
- Company type: Joint-stock company
- Industry: Defense
- Founded: 1875
- Founder: Robert Whitehead
- Headquarters: Livorno, Italy
- Products: Underwater defense systems (torpedoes and sonars)
- Parent: Fincantieri
- Website: https://www.fincantieri.com/it/gruppo/controllate-collegate/wass-submarine-systems/

WASS Submarine Systems is a company controlled by Fincantieri, active in the construction of advanced underwater defense systems, such as torpedoes and sonars.

== History ==
=== Origins ===
The origins of the company date back to 1875, when the English engineer Robert Whitehead inaugurated in Rijeka, then part of the Austro-Hungarian Empire, the Torpedo Fabrik von Robert Whitehead, the world's first plant for the production of torpedoes.

The company saw its orders grow, including from several foreign navies such as the United States Navy. In addition to selling governments the rights to use and reproduce its products, the company established subsidiaries or helped set up torpedo factories abroad.

In 1905 the company became a joint-stock corporation under the name Torpedo Fabrik Whitehead & Co. Gesellschaft. In the same year, following Whitehead's death, the Vickers-Armstrong Whitworth group acquired the majority stake.

The Rijeka torpedo factory worked for the Central Powers during the First World War, at the end of which it declared bankruptcy. However, following the Treaty of Rome of 1924, which established the transfer of the city of Rijeka to Italy, it was taken over by a group of Italian entrepreneurs led by engineer Giuseppe Orlando, under the name Silurificio Whitehead di Fiume S.A.

=== The Livorno torpedo factory ===
A second branch, the Livorno torpedo factory, opened in 1937 under the name Società Moto Fides; it initially built components for torpedoes made in Rijeka. Later, from 1941, it began producing complete torpedoes, and in 1943 built a torpedo depot on the Tuscan coast at Porto Santo Stefano; however, it never entered service because it was destroyed the same year during bombings.

Whitehead-Moto Fides of Livorno became part of the Fiat group in 1945, resuming activities including, in the 1960s, high-tech products for the Italian Navy and, in the 1970s, engines for pleasure boats.

Among its military products were the light torpedo A-244 (324 mm caliber) and the heavy torpedo A-184 (533 mm). The first never equipped Italian Navy vessels but had significant export success, while the second equipped both submarines (the Toti, Sauro, and modern U-212) and surface vessels engaged in anti-submarine warfare (such as the Maestrale), and was also exported.

In 1974 the company absorbed Fiat's Marina di Pisa division (formerly Costruzioni Meccaniche Aeronautiche S.A.), which produced automotive accessories. The Marina di Pisa facilities closed in 1986. In 1985 Whitehead-Motofides was split into Motofides, devoted to civilian and military products for the Italian Army, and Whitehead, focused on naval defense systems.

=== From the 1990s to the present ===
In 1990 the company took the name Whitehead S.p.A. after merging Whitehead with Misar, another company of the Gilardini group. In July 1993 Whitehead S.p.A. joined with French companies DCN and Thomson-CSF to establish the EuroTorp GEIE consortium. The company held a 50% share, while DCN held 26% and Thomson-CSF 24%. This cooperation produced the MU90 Impact lightweight torpedo, derived from the French Murene project and the Italian A-290 Project, adopted by the navies of France, Germany, Denmark, Poland, and Australia. In 1994 the company became Sistemi Subacquei Welse S.p.A. following the merger of the underwater activities of Whitehead S.p.A., Fiat Componenti e Impianti per l'Energia e l'Industria, Usea S.p.A. and Alenia Elsag Sistemi Navali. In 1995 Gilardini S.p.A. was absorbed by Magneti Marelli and its military sector was divested and sold to Finmeccanica. The company, after leaving the Fiat group, took the name WASS Whitehead Alenia Sistemi Subacquei S.p.A., later shortened in 2012 to WASS Whitehead Sistemi Subacquei S.p.A.

On 1 January 2016, WASS's activities were merged into the Defence Systems Division within the Electronics, Defence and Security Systems sector of Leonardo – Finmeccanica S.p.A.

On 14 January 2025, Fincantieri completed the acquisition of Leonardo's Underwater Armaments & Systems (UAS) business line, corresponding to the former WASS, through the purchase of the entire share capital of the newly established company WASS Submarine Systems S.r.l., into which the UAS business line had been previously transferred.

== Operations ==
WASS is based in Livorno and Pozzuoli, and operates in the underwater defense industry, designing and manufacturing: heavy and light torpedoes, torpedo launch systems, anti-torpedo defense systems for ships and submarines, and sonars for both military and civilian applications.

It is responsible for developing the Black Shark wire-guided heavyweight torpedo, intended for the U212 NFS submarines being built by Fincantieri for the Italian Navy. Through its 50% participation in the EuroTorp GEIE (with Naval Group and Thales), it also designs and manufactures the MU90 lightweight torpedo.

WASS also carries out research and development programs on fuel cells and batteries. Among its main results are a primary Al-AgO (aluminium–silver oxide) battery and a secondary Li-Po (lithium-polymer) battery for the Black Shark Advanced torpedo.

It is also active in the study and development of underwater platforms, usable as remotely operated vehicles (ROVs) or autonomous underwater vehicles (AUVs), including the V-FIDES (Filoguided Vehicle for Identification and Submarine Detection). These systems are designed for both military (underwater surveillance, seabed mapping, intelligence operations, mine clearance) and civilian (environmental monitoring, marine biology, and underwater archaeology) applications.
