= APR-3 torpedo =

APR-3E
- Type: Lightweight ASW homing torpedo
- Place of origin: Russia

Service history
- Used by: Russian Navy; People's Liberation Army Navy

Production history
- Manufacturer: Tactical Missiles Corporation

Specifications
- Mass: 525 kg (1,157 lb) (another 25 kg for accessory for aircraft deployment)
- Length: 3.685 m (12.09 ft)
- Diameter: 350 mm (14 in)
- Warhead weight: 74 kg (163 lb)
- Detonation mechanism: Impact and proximity fuze
- Engine: Rocket-powered turbo-waterjet
- Propellant: Solid fuel
- Operational range: >3 km (1.6 nmi)
- Maximum depth: 540 m (1,770 ft)
- Maximum speed: >56 kn (103.7 km/h; 64.4 mph)
- Guidance system: Acoustic homing
- Launch platform: Beriev Be-200; Ilyushin Il-38; Kamov Ka-27; Tupolev Tu-142

The APR-3E airborne light ASW acoustic homing torpedo is designed by Russian Tactical Missiles Corporation JSC to engage current and future submarines at depth from the surface down to 800 metres at speed of up to 43+ knots. It is a replacement for earlier APR-2 light antisubmarine acoustic homing torpedo.

APR-3E airborne light antisubmarine acoustic homing torpedo is designed to be carried by various fixed-wing and rotary wing platforms including Tu-142, Il-38, Ka-28 and other aircraft. The torpedo requires at least 100 metres depth of water for the initial air-drop and can be deployed in conditions up to sea state 6.

Once entering water, the control surfaces of the torpedo enable it to travel in a spiral path with the help of gravity without starting the engine. During this stage, the acoustic seeker of the torpedo searches for targets. Once a target is identified, the engine starts and solid propellant rocket engine ensures the target has very little or virtually no time to react, thus increasing the kill probability.

The newest version of this torpedo is the APR-3M, with modified characteristics. Trials of the APR-3M missile have been completed, the process of its serial production has been organized and its deliveries to the Ministry of Defence of Russia are underway as of May 2019.

Users: Russia purchased a small number of APR-3 for its navy, while China was reported to be the first export customer when APR-3E was part of the Chinese Be-200 ASW aircraft purchase package.

== Specifications ==
- Designation: APR-3E light ASW torpedo (Manufacturer calls the weapon as a missile instead)
- Manufacturer: Region Scientific and Production Enterprise JSC division of the Tactical Missiles Corporation Joint Stock Co.
- Speed: > 56 kn
- Range: > 3 km
- Diameter: 350 mm
- Length: 3.685 m
- Weight: 525 kg (another 25 kg for accessory for aircraft deployment)
- Propulsion: solid-propellant rocket-powered turbo-waterjet
- Fuze: impact and proximity
- Warhead: 74 kg
- Seeker: acoustic
- Seeker range: 1.5 km – 2 km
- Maximum target speed: > 43 kn

== See also ==
- A244-S - Italian equivalent
- Mark 54 Lightweight Torpedo - US Navy's equivalent
- MU90 Impact - French/Italian equivalent
- Sting Ray (torpedo) - British equivalent
- TAL Shyena - Indian equivalent
- Yu-7 torpedo - Chinese equivalent
- K745 Chung Sang Eo - South Korean equivalent
- Type 97 light weight torpedo (G-RX4) - Japanese equivalent
