= A244 torpedo =

Italian lightweight torpedo

A244/S Torpedo
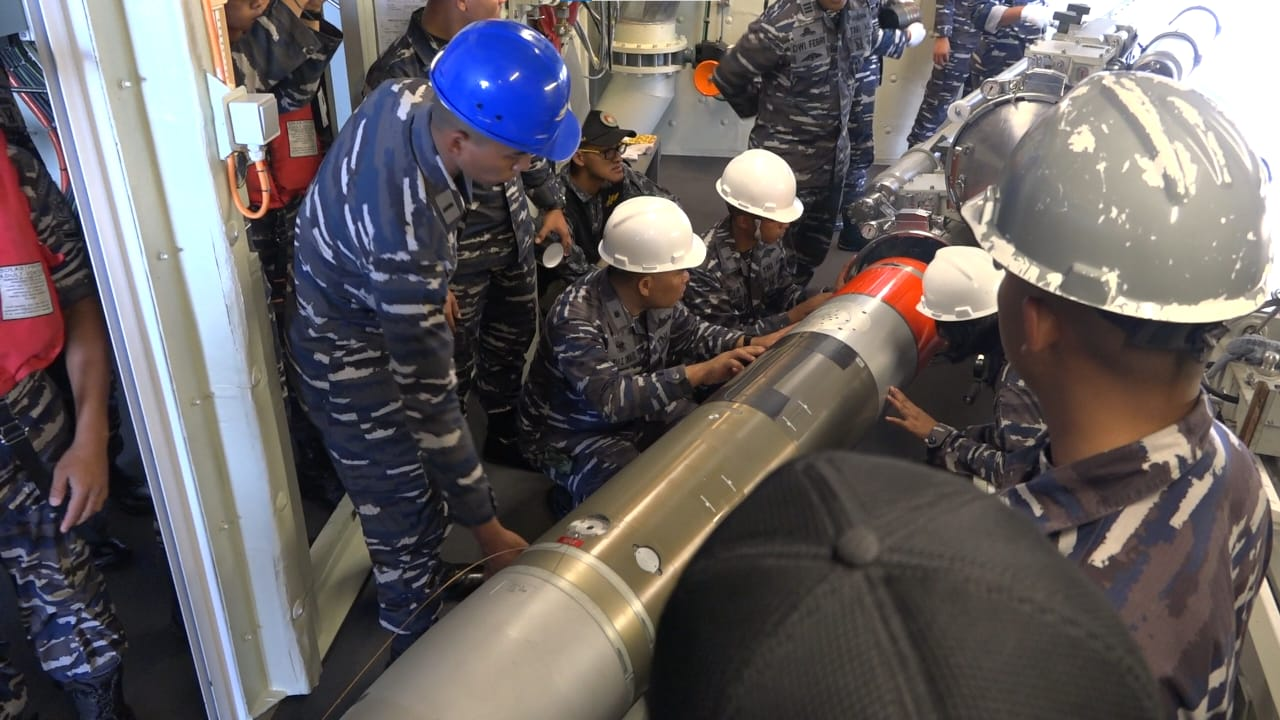
- Indonesian Navy frigate KRI Raden Eddy Martadinata during torpedo firing exercise with WASS A244/S Mod 3 lightweight torpedo (training head).
- Type: Lightweight ASW torpedo
- Place of origin: Italy

Service history
- In service: 1982

Production history
- Manufacturer: Leonardo

Specifications
- Mass: 254 kg (560 lb)
- Length: 2.75 m (9.0 ft)
- Diameter: 324 mm (12.8 in)
- Effective firing range: 13.5 km (7.3 nmi)
- Maximum firing range: 6 to 6.5 km for Mod 0 through Mod 2, 13.5 km for Mod 3
- Warhead: High explosive STANAG 4439 and MURAT-2 compliant
- Warhead weight: 45.4 kg (100 lb)
- Detonation mechanism: Impact and proximity
- Engine: Contra-rotating direct-drive brushless electric motor
- Propellant: AgCl-Mg battery
- Maximum depth: 10 m to >600 m
- Maximum speed: 30–39 kn (56–72 km/h)
- Guidance system: Active/passive acoustic homing
- Steering system: CIACIO-S seeker
- Launch platform: Surface ships and aircraft

The A244/S is an Italian lightweight, fire-and-forget torpedo employed for anti-submarine warfare. It can be launched from surface vessels or aircraft and locates the target using an acoustic seeker. The torpedo body conforms to the NATO 12.75-inch (323.8 mm) standard and is compatible with USN Mark 32 torpedo tubes.

== Description ==
The A244 was initially conceived at Whitehead Alenia in 1968 as a replacement for the USN Mark 44 Mod 2 and shares many design similarities with the older weapon. A244 entered service in 1971 although development continued through 1973, and mass production began in 1975. The weapon was superseded by A244/S which entered service in 1984. Whereas the A244 used a monotone (single frequency) seeker, the A244/S uses triple frequency pulses and a programmable seeker which can follow search patterns and perform standard maneuvers. Originally equipped with a Selenia Elsag AG70 seeker, work on CIACIO began in 1964, resulting in a 60 kHz CIACIO 60 seeker in 1966 and a 30 kHz CIACIO 30 seeker in 1968. The final version, CIACIO-S, originally appeared in 1972 with laboratory trials in 1973 and static sea trials in 1974, followed by live trials using Mark 44 torpedoes equipped with the new seeker in 1975. Shallow water trials were carried out in 1977-1978. A244/S Mod 1 was ready for delivery in 1987. Mod 0 (intended for torpedo tube launch) and Mod 1 (intended for helicopter launch) had an endurance of 6,500 m (3.5 nmi) at 37 kn (69 km/h), a length of 2.70 m (8.9 ft), and a unit mass of 221 kg (487 lb). Mod 2 (intended for fixed-wing aircraft launch) had a length of 2.75 m (9.0 ft) and an endurance of 6,000 m (3.2 nmi). All of the older versions used a lead-acid battery power source and carried a 45.4 kg (100 lb) warhead.

The present-day version is the A244/S Mod 3, manufactured by WASS. The A244/S Mod 3 was announced in October 1998. The Mod 3 was engineered by retrofitting the MU90 torpedo, particularly its guidance system. The power source was re-engineered to use a silver oxide battery. The Mod 3 torpedo uses a CIACIO-S seeker, consisting of an acoustic homing head containing the transducer assembly, transmitter, and related beamforming circuits, and a frame housing all the remaining electronic components. The seeker head contains 36 transducers in an 6x6 array, capable of generating eight acoustic beams. The homing head is capable of active, passive, and mixed modes for closing onto its target. It can also discriminate between decoys and real targets in the presence of heavy reverberations especially emitted pulses and signal processing. Signal processing is digital, utilizing FFT.

A new A244/S Mod 4 variant has been developed, available both as a newly produced torpedo or as an upgrade kit for existing Mod 3 weapons; the Mod 4 has enhanced performance (higher top speed and improved endurance) and increased maneuvrability thanks to the redesigned tail controls with 4 independent rudders (similarly to the MU90 Impact). In 2021 WASS announced the A244/S Mod 4 torpedo had been selected by an undisclosed launch customer, and as of 2025 the company claims the type has been ordered by two unspecified operators in Asia.

== Operators ==
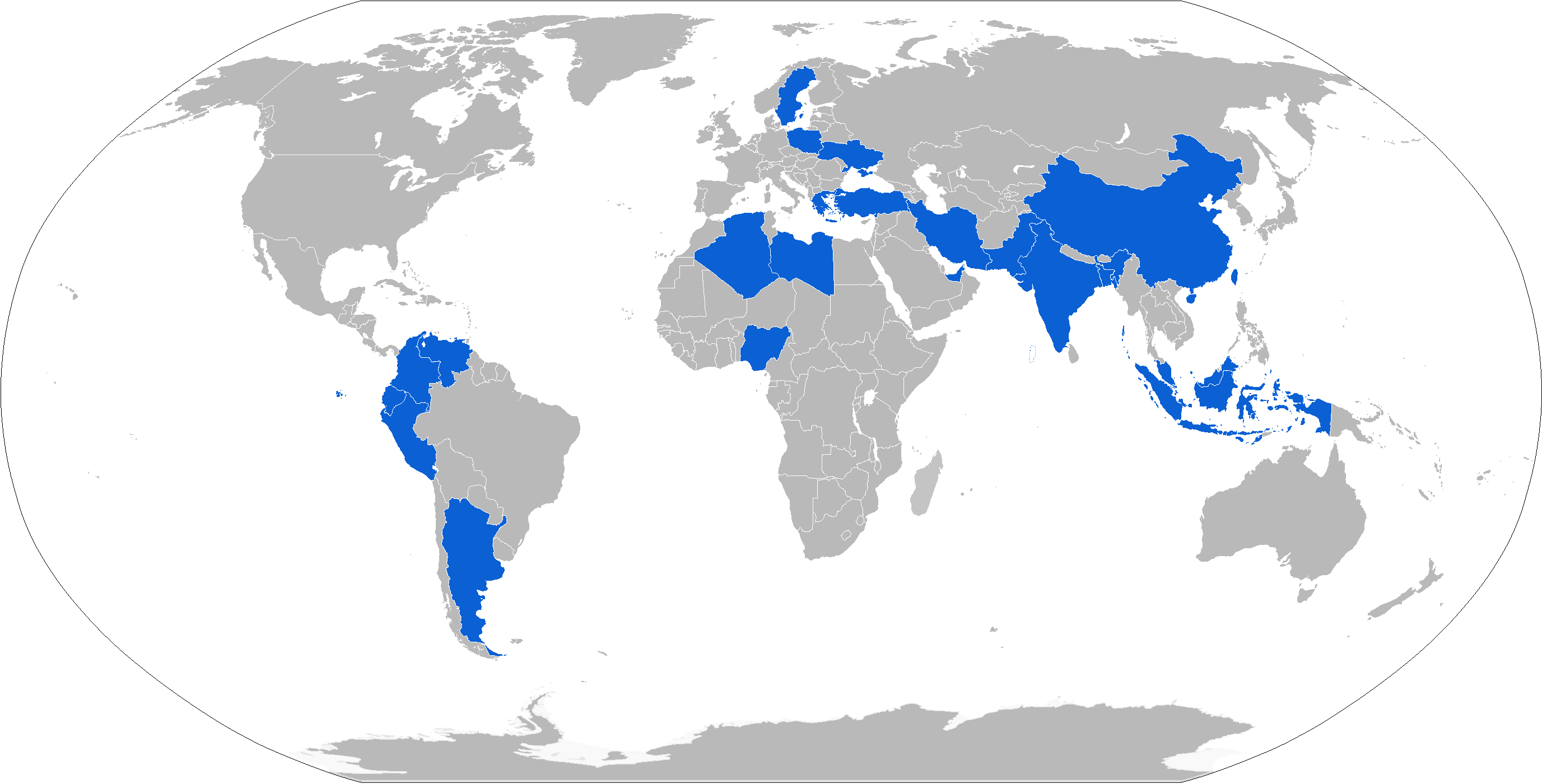
Map with A244-S operators in blue

=== Current operators ===
- Algerian National Navy - 25 ordered in 2011
- Argentine Navy - 540
- Bangladesh Navy
- People's Liberation Army Navy - 50 (as ET52 torpedo)
- Chilean Navy - 781
- Ecuadorian Navy - 72
- Indian Navy - 450 (NST58 torpedo, another derivative)
- Indonesian Navy - 88
- Islamic Republic of Iran Navy - 12
- Libyan Navy - 12
- Royal Malaysian Navy - 75
- Nigerian Navy - 18
- Pakistan Navy - 12
- Peruvian Navy - 72
- Polish Navy - 6 (for familiarization before delivery of MU90)
- Republic of Singapore Navy - 250 Mod 1; 100 Mod 3
- Swedish Navy - 80 Swedish designation Torped 44 (Bought as a stopgap during the Submarine Crisis in the 80s while waiting for the new Swedish Torped 45)
- Republic of China Navy - 120
- Turkish Navy - 50
- Ukrainian Navy - Ordered in 2010 for Project 58250 frigates
- United Arab Emirates Navy - 50 Mod 1 ordered April 1997 for 29.5 million dollars; 24 + 25 ordered in 2005 for 12 million Euros
- Bolivarian Navy of Venezuela - 150

=== Future operators ===
Bulgaria

- Bulgarian Navy: In October 2022 Bulgarian government decided the purchase A244-S for the two future patrol ships of Bulgarian navy. Bulgarian Navy will receive 24 A244-S mod.3 torpedoes and supporting equipment for the price of 39.3 mln euros. The torpedoes also will be used from Bulgarian navy Eurocopter AS565 Panther helicopters. The first ship is under construction and will be commissioned in 2025.

== See also ==
- APR-3E torpedo - Russian light torpedo
- K745 Blue Shark - South Korean light torpedo
- Mark 46 - American light torpedo
- Mark 54 - American light torpedo
- MU90 Impact - French/Italian torpedo (A244/S successor)
- Sting Ray - British light torpedo
- TAL Shyena - Indian light torpedo
- Type 73 - Japanese light torpedo
- Type 97 - Japanese light torpedo
- Yu-7 - Chinese light torpedo (derivative of A244/S)

== Bibliography ==
- Funnell, Clifford, ed. (February 2007). Jane's Underwater Warfare Systems, 2007-2008 (19th ed.). Jane's Information Group. ISBN 978-0-7106-2815-2.
- Friedman, Norman (February 2006). The Naval Institute Guide to World Naval Weapon Systems (5th ed.). Naval Institute Press. ISBN 9781557502629.
