= MU90 Impact =

- Type: Lightweight ASW torpedo
- Place of origin: France/Italy

Service history
- Used by: See Operators

Production history
- Manufacturer: EuroTorp
- Unit cost: €1.6m (~US$2.1m) (FY2012)
- No. built: >1000
- Variants: MU90 Hard Kill

Specifications
- Mass: 304 kg (670 lb)
- Length: 2.85 m (112 in)
- Diameter: 323.7 mm (12.74 in)
- Warhead: PBX shaped charge warhead
- Warhead weight: 32.7 kg
- Engine: Pump-jet; Electric
- Operational range: >10 km (5.4 nmi) (max speed) >23 km (12 nmi) (min speed)
- Maximum depth: >1000 m
- Maximum speed: 29 kn (54 km/h) to well over 50 kn (93 km/h)
- Guidance system: Active or passive acoustic homing
- Launch platform: Surface ships aircraft

The MU90 Impact is a Franco-Italian advanced lightweight anti-submarine torpedo of the third generation developed for the French and Italian navies, as well as for export. It is designed to outperform the United States-built Mark 54 in the anti-submarine role and was developed in a special MU90 Hard Kill version for anti-torpedo defence. It is built by EuroTorp, a consortium of French and Italian companies.

== History ==
The MU90 was the result of separate projects in France and Italy from the 1980s. In France, a project under the direction of Thomson Sintra created the "Murène" in 1989, while in Italy WASS started work on an A244 replacement known as the A290. In 1990 the first attempts to merge the two efforts started, a process that was completed in 1993 with the formation of EuroTorp.

France intended to use the new torpedo on its frigates, Atlantique 2 aircraft, Lynx helicopters and NFH90 helicopters. It originally wanted 1000 units, but the end of the Cold War saw this cut to 600 in 1991, 450 in 2000 and finally 300 in 2008. The project cost the government €1,150m in 2012 prices at a unit cost of €1.6m, or €3.8m including development costs. It received 25 torpedoes a year until 2014.

== Design ==
The MU90 is designed to be capable of discriminating between actual and perceived threat, including a bottomed stationary mini-submarine, known versions of anechoic coatings, and various decoys. It is also capable of launch speeds up to 400 knots (740 km/h; 460 mph), allowing it to be dropped from maritime patrol aircraft flying at high speeds, or rocket-assist launchers. Powered by an electric pump-jet, it can be run at "silent" speeds to avoid giving its location away to the submarine, or "dash" at speeds over 29 knots. It uses a shaped charge warhead that can penetrate any known submarine hull, in particular Soviet double hull designs, while remaining just as deadly in shallow waters where conventional warheads are less effective.

In 1986 France and Italy began a collaboration to develop an anti-submarine missile based on the Italian Otomat missile. France dropped out of the programme but Italy has fitted the MBDA MILAS missile to its Durand de la Penne-class destroyers and FREMM anti-submarine frigates. MILAS is an 800 kg (1,800 lb) missile that can deliver a MU90 to 35 kilometres (19 nmi).

views of the MU90
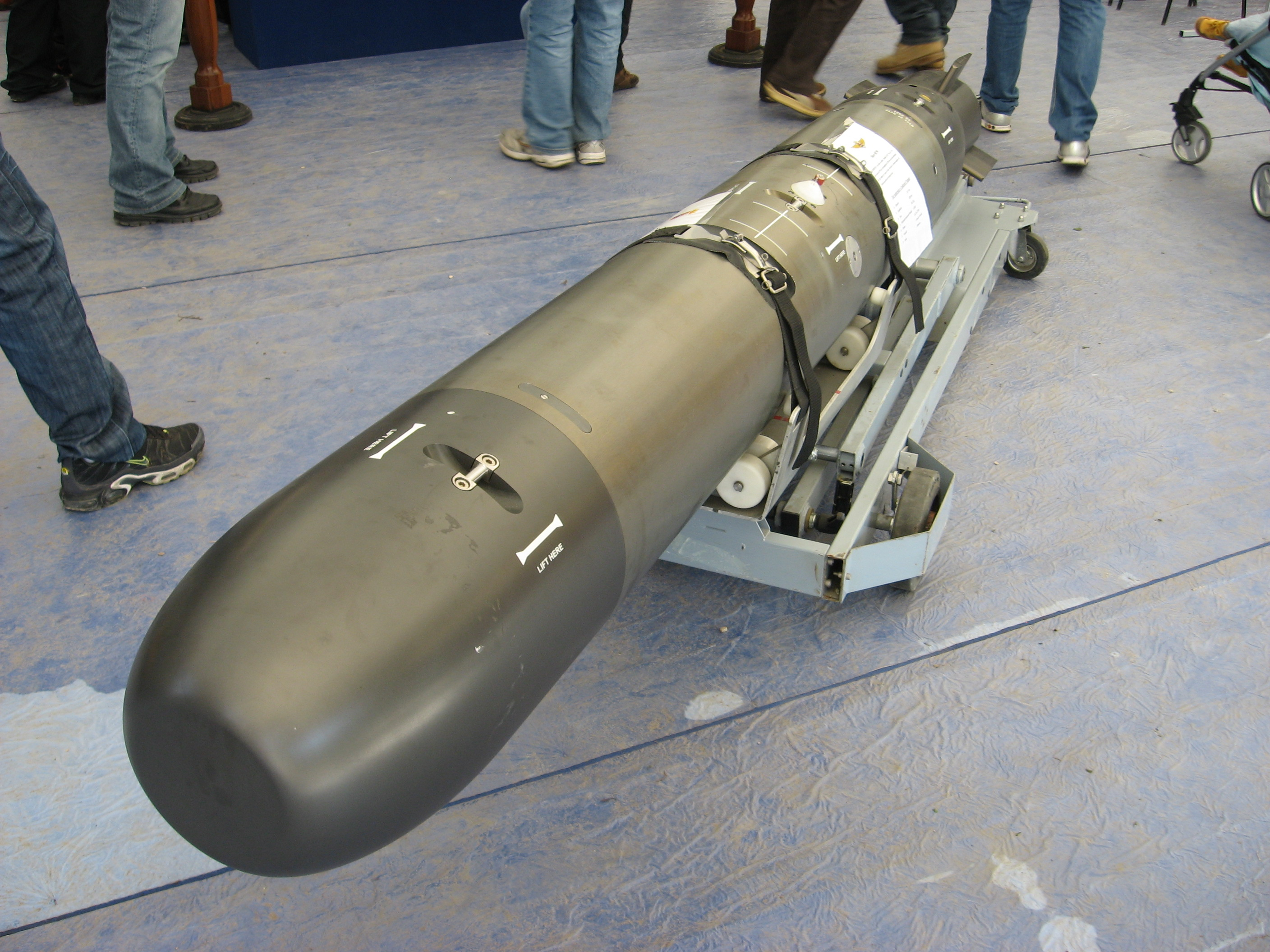
Frontal view of an MU90.

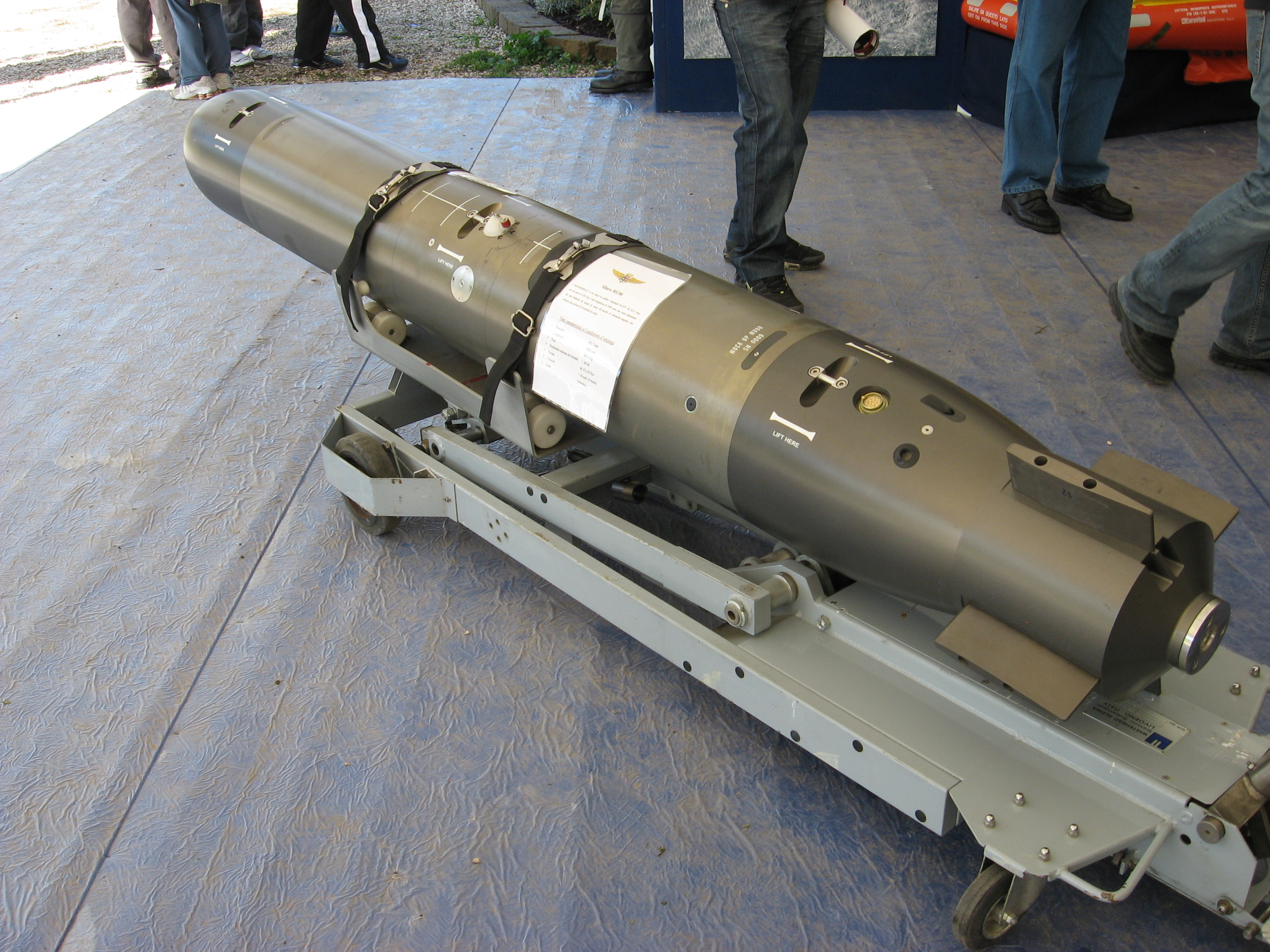
Rear view of an MU90.

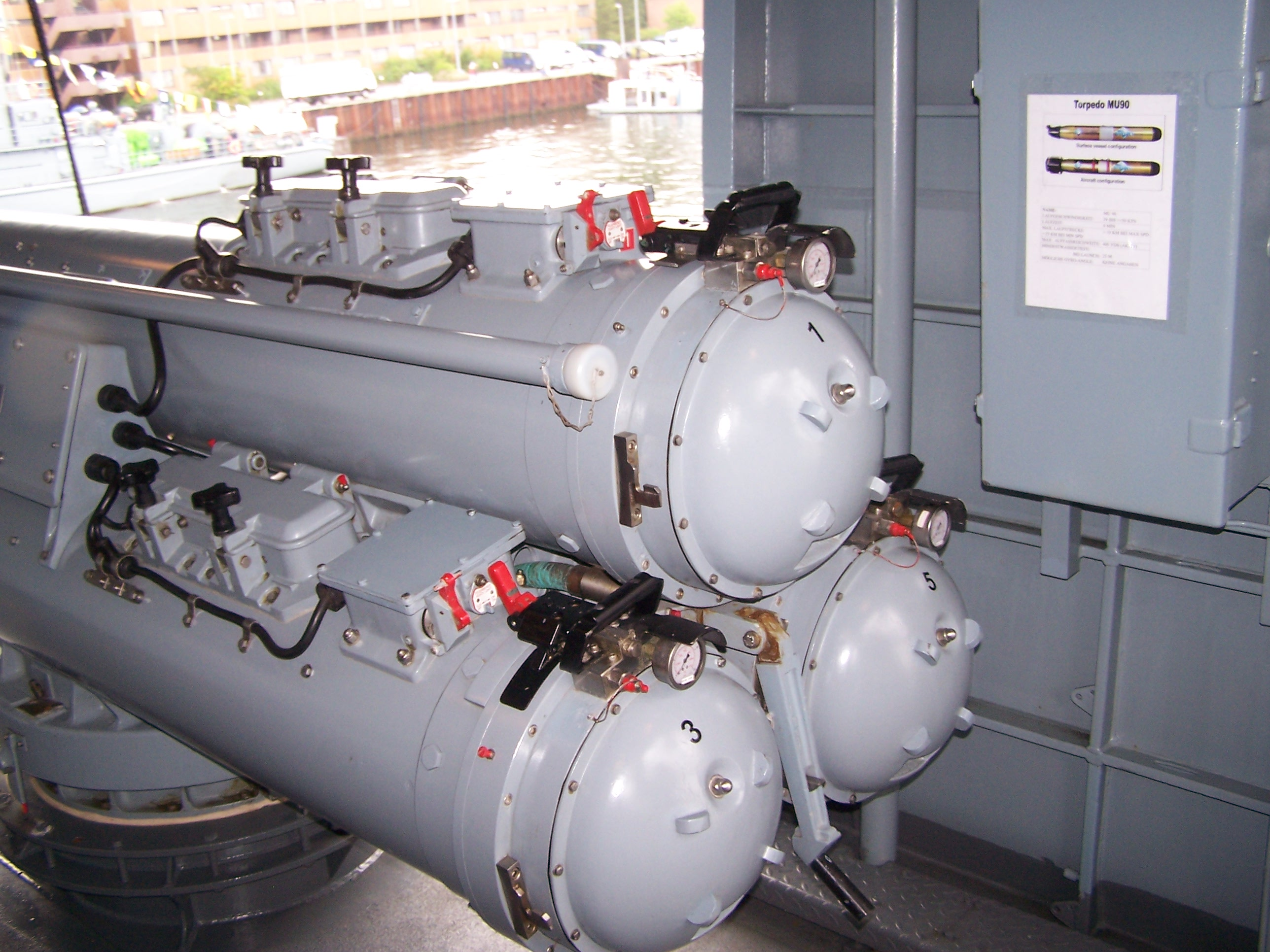
MU90 torpedo launcher aboard F221 Hessen, a Sachsen-class frigate of the German Navy.

== Exports ==
After deciding that its Mark 46 torpedoes were inadequate, Australia set up the JP2070 project in 1998 to buy torpedoes for its Adelaide-class frigates, Anzac-class frigates, AP-3C Orion aircraft, S-70B-2 Seahawk helicopters and planned SH-2G(A) Super Seasprite helicopters. The Seasprites were cancelled and the Orions and Seahawks were removed from the MU90 programme on budget grounds; their replacements, the P-8 Poseidon and MH-60R Seahawk will use the US Mark 54 torpedo. The A$639m project to buy a classified number of MU90 has been heavily criticised by the Australian National Audit Office on the grounds of cost, insufficient test firings which failed to reveal defects in the torpedo, and the lack of commonality with the Navy's air-launched torpedoes. The MU90 reached IOC in November 2012.

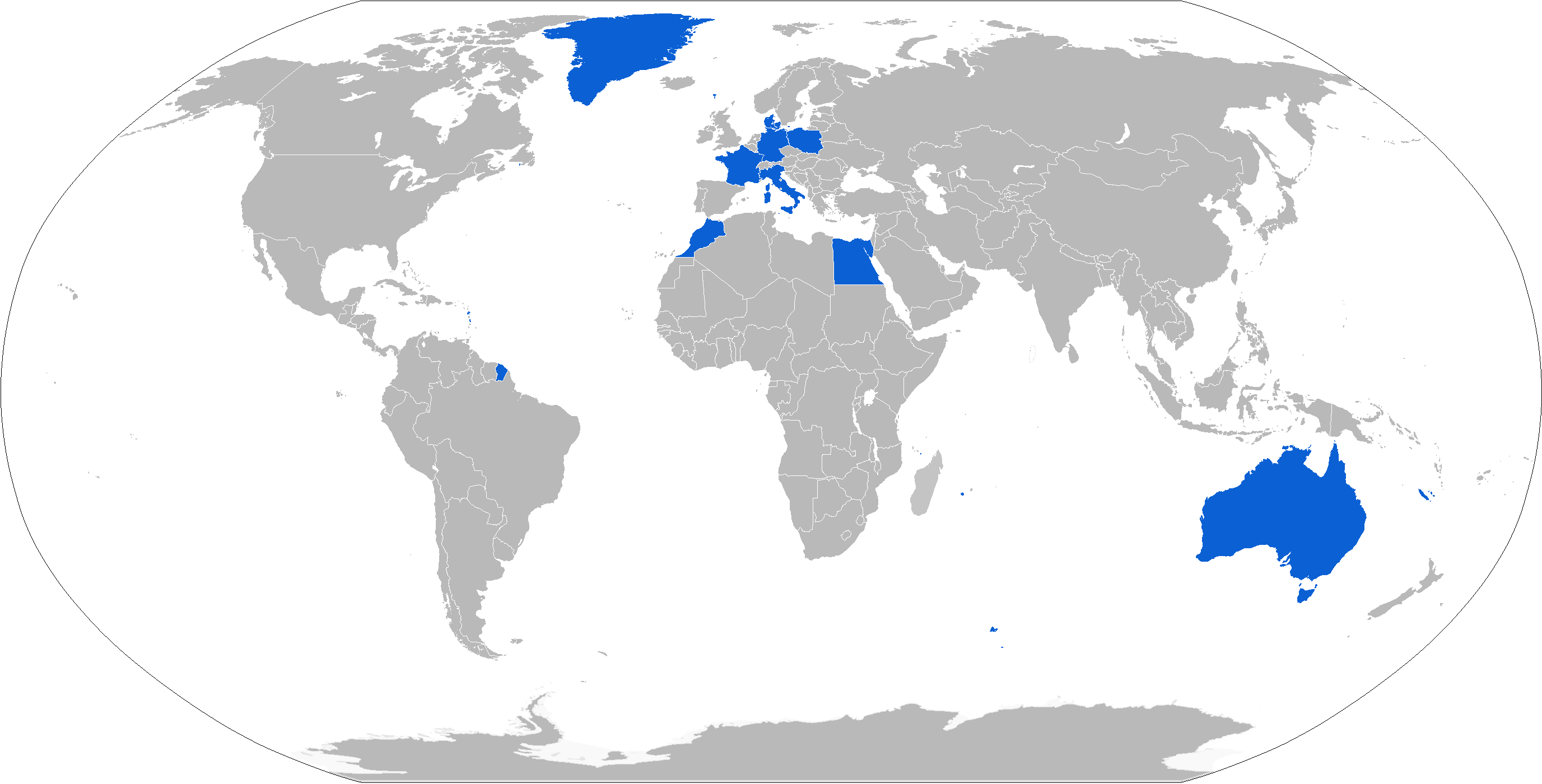
Map with MU90 operators in blue

== Operators ==
=== Aircraft ===
==== Current aircraft operational with the MU90 ====
France
- Atlantique 2
- NHIndustries NH90 NFH - Caïman Marine
Germany
- Westland Sea Lynx Mk 88 A
Italy
- AgustaWestland EH101 ASW/ASuW
- NHIndustries NH90 NFH
Poland
- Kaman SH-2G Super Seasprite
- Mil Mi-14PŁ
Qatar
- NHIndustries NH90 NFH

==== Future aircraft to use the MU90 ====
Germany
- NHIndustries NH90 NFH - Sea Tiger

==== Potential aircraft to use the MU90 ====
France
- Airbus A321MPA
Poland
- AgustaWestland AW101 ASW

==== Aircraft retired that used the MU90 ====
France
- Westland WG13 Lynx
Germany
- Lockheed P-3 Orion (P-3C CUP+ variant). Note: the aircraft sold to Portugal.

=== Ships ===
==== Current ships operational with the MU90 ====
Australia
- 3 Hobart class destroyers (each ship with 2 × Mark 32 Mod 9 torpedo launchers).
- 7 Anzac class frigates, a variant of the MEKO 200 class (each ship with 2 × Mark 32 Mod 9 torpedo launchers).
Denmark
- 2 Absalon class frigates (each ship with 2 × Mark 32 Mod 14 torpedo launchers).
- 3 Iver Huitfeldt class frigates (each ship with 2 × Eurotorp B515 torpedo launchers).
- 3 Knud Rasmussen class patrol vessels (each ship with 1 × torpedo launcher).
Egypt
- 1 Tahya Misr ASW frigate based on the Acquitaine class, the French FREMM (2 × Eurotorp B515/3 torpedo launchers).
- 2 Bergamini class frigates (general purpose variant), the Italian FREMM (each ship with 2 × Eurotorp B515/3 torpedo launchers).
- 6 MEKO A-200 EN class frigates (each ship with 2 × Eurotorp B515/2 torpedo launchers).
- 4 Gowind 2500 class corvettes (each ship with 2 × Eurotorp B515/3 torpedo launchers).
France
- 8 Acquitaine class frigates, the French FREMM (each ship with 2 × Eurotorp B515/3 torpedo launchers).
- 2 Horizon class frigates (each ship with 2 × Eurotorp B515/1 torpedo launchers).
Germany
- 3 Sachsen class (Type 124) frigates (each ship with 2 × Eurotorp B515 torpedo launchers).
Italy
- 2 Andrea Doria class destroyer (each ship with 2 × Eurotorp B515/1 torpedo launchers).
- 4 Bergamini class frigates (general purpose variant), the Italian FREMM (each ship with 2 × Eurotorp B515/3 torpedo launchers).
- 6 Bergamini class frigates (the ASW and the ASW / GP variants), the Italian FREMM (each ship with 2 × Eurotorp B515/3 torpedo launchers and with the MILAS missile).
Greece
- 4 Kimon class frigates (1 delivered, 3 on order), a variant of the Defence and intervention frigate class (each ship with 2 × EuroTorp MU90 TLS torpedo launchers).
Morocco
- 1 Mohammed VI ASW frigate based on the Acquitaine class, the French FREMM (2 × Eurotorp B515/3 torpedo launchers).
- 3 Damen SIGMA 10513 class frigates (2 × Eurotorp B515/3 torpedo launchers).
Poland
- 2 Oliver Hazard Perry class frigates, transferred from the US Navy, modified to operate the MU90.
Singapore
- 6 Formidable class frigates, available on the class after modernisation (2 × Eurotorp B515/3 torpedo launchers).
United Arab Emirates
- 2 Gowind class corvettes (2 × Eurotorp B515/3 torpedo launchers).

==== Future ships to use the MU90 ====
Australia
- 3 Hunter class frigates on order (+ 3 expected), a variant of the Type 26 class (each ship with 2 × EuroTorp MU90 TLS torpedo launchers).
France
- 5 Defence and intervention frigate class (each ship with 2 × EuroTorp MU90 TLS torpedo launchers).
Italy
- 2 FREMM EVO frigates (ASW-enhanced variant), the Italian FREMM (each ship with 2 × Eurotorp B515/3 torpedo launchers)
Note: the FREMM EVO seems to be the last ship in production to receive the MU90, as the Thaon di Revel class OPV is receiving the new lightweight torpedo from Leonardo, the Black Arrow.
Poland
- 3 Arrowhead 140 PL frigates, a variant of the Type 31 class (each ship with 2 × EuroTorp MU90 TLS torpedo launchers).
Portugal
- 3 FREMM EVO frigates (ASW-enhanced variant), the Italian FREMM (each ship with 2 × Eurotorp B515/3 torpedo launchers)
Ukraine
- 2 Ada class corvettes.

==== Potential ships to use the MU90 ====
Australia
- Up to 11 New FFM, an upgraded variant of the Mogami class, it might use the same torpedo as the other Australian Navy ships.
Denmark
- 6 OMT MPV-80 modular OPV, for which planned ASW modules that could use the MU90 torpedo.
Singapore
- 6 MRCV class MCM (2 × Eurotorp B515 torpedo launchers with MU90 or A244 MOD.3).

==== Ships that used the MU90 ====
Australia
- 4 modernised Adelaide class frigates, a variant of the Oliver Hazard Perry class (each ship with 2 × Mark 32 Mod 5 torpedo launchers). Note: 2 ships sold to Chile with the torpedo launchers capable to use the MU90.
France
- 7 Georges Leygues class frigates (each ship with 2 × torpedo launchers).
Italy
- 2 Durand de la Penne class destroyers, (each ship with 2 × Eurotorp B515 torpedo launchers and with the MILAS missile).

==== Cancelled projects that would have used the MU90 ====
Poland
- 6 Gawron class corvettes, a variant of the MEKO A-100, were planned, of which only 1 was built (the ORP Ślązak). The MU90 was supposed to be used, but the project ended up not using it.

== See also ==
- Torped 47 — Swedish equivalent
- Mark 54 Lightweight Torpedo — US Navy's equivalent
- Sting Ray (torpedo) — British equivalent
- APR-3E torpedo — Russian equivalent
- A244-S — Italian equivalent
- TAL Shyena — Indian equivalent
- Yu-7 torpedo — Chinese equivalent
- K745 Chung Sang Eo — South Korean equivalent
- Type 97 light weight torpedo (G-RX4) — Japanese equivalent
