= Acoustic homing =

Type of navigation system

Acoustic homing is the process in which a system uses the sound or acoustic signals of a target or destination to guide a moving object. There are two types of acoustic homing: passive acoustic homing and active acoustic homing. Objects using passive acoustic homing rely on detecting acoustic emissions produced by the target. Conversely, objects using active acoustic homing make use of sonar to emit a signal and detect its reflection off the target. The signal detected is then processed by the system to determine the proper response for the object. Acoustic homing is useful for applications where other forms of navigation and tracking can be ineffective. It is commonly used in environments where radio or GPS signals can not be detected, such as underwater.

== History ==
The idea of using sound for navigation and homing dates back centuries and has been developed over time, so the concept of acoustic homing can not be attributed to a single individual.

Certain animals have always used sound-based navigation to survive. Bats and dolphins both use echolocation to locate prey. These animals emit sound signals and listen to the echoes for navigation and hunting purposes.

One of the earliest recorded human instances of using sound for underwater navigation was the use of a sounding lead. Sailors would lower a weighted line with a lead weight attached to the end of it. By listening to the sound it made when it hit the seafloor, they were able to estimate the water's depth and the nature of the seabed.

In the 18th century, foghorns were developed to aid navigation for ships in low visibility conditions caused by fog. Foghorns produced loud and low-frequency sounds that traveled over long distances. The sounds helped boats identify lighthouses and other locations as well as avoid hazards.

In the early 19th century, scientists and inventors such as Charles Babbage and Samuel Morse experimented with underwater signaling systems. These experiments involved using bells and other sound signals to communicate with objects submerged under the water. Through these efforts, the foundation for modern underwater acoustics and sonar technology was laid out.

In the early 20th century, a Canadian inventor Reginald Fessenden developed what many believe to be the first practical underwater acoustic communication system. He used sound waves to transmit messages underwater.

In World War II, acoustic homing was used by both the United States Navy and the Germans to develop acoustic torpedoes to counter enemy submarines. Early versions used hydrophones to detect and navigate the torpedo to the noise of the submarine.

In the mid 20th century, sonobuoys were developed for antisubmarine warfare. Sonobuoys were small floating devices dropped by aircraft that detected underwater sounds and transmitted information back to the sender.

== Method ==
An illustration of steering based on sound volume

An object can be equipped with two or more acoustic transducers, which function as speakers and microphones. If a transducer receives a sound louder than that received by the other transducer, the object turns in the transducer's direction. If the object is to maneuver in three-dimensional space, more than two transducers are needed. Typically, more than three transducers are used, and arrays of over 100 are not unknown. A large number of transducers allows for more accurate steering.

== Principles ==
Below is a simplified method of the process of acoustic homing:

1. Source of sound: An object that emits acoustic signals such as a beacon or transmitter generates sound waves. The sound waves propagate through the surrounding medium, such as air or water.
2. Receiver: A device or system is equipped with acoustic receivers such as microphones or hydrophones designed to detect acoustic signals in the environment.
3. Detection: The acoustic receivers pick up or "home in" on the source of sound. The sound signals are converted into electrical signals for processing.
4. Signal Processing: Signal processing techniques are used to analyze the converted electrical signals. This includes:
  1. Time delay analysis: used to calculate direction and angle relative to source.
  2. Signal strength analysis: used to define proximity of source. Stronger signals suggest closer proximity, while weaker signals suggest farther proximity.
  3. Frequency analysis: used to identify the source.
  4. Direction analysis: Based on the time delay analysis and other characteristics of the sound signals, the system determines the direction of the source of sound.
5. Control mechanism: The device using the acoustic homing system is often equipped with control mechanisms to help it steer towards or away from the source of sound.
6. Navigation: The system determines the proper response and navigates the device towards or away from the sound source.

== Active vs. Passive Acoustic Homing ==
=== Active Acoustic Homing ===
Definition: Active acoustic homing is a guidance method where the system emits its own acoustic signals and receives return echoes to locate and track a specified target. The system actively transmits sound waves and receives echoes from the target, which it then processes.

Sensing method: Active acoustic homing systems use transducers or hydrophones, which function as both sound transmitters and receivers. The transducers/hydrophones emit sound waves, and the sensors in the transducers/hydrophones detect the echoes from the target.

Strengths: Active acoustic homing is effective at identifying and tracking targets when the target responds to active acoustic signals. It provides precision in tracking and locating targets.

Limitations: Active acoustic signals can be detected by the target, potentially giving away the position of the homing system. It is also susceptible to countermeasures such as noisemakers and decoys.

Uses: Active acoustic homing is commonly used in anti-submarine warfare, where it is used to locate and engage submarines by pinging them with sound signals.

=== Passive Acoustic Homing ===
Definition: Passive acoustic homing is a guidance method that does not actively emit acoustic signals but rather relies on detecting acoustic emissions of the target. It listens for acoustic sounds that are naturally generated by the target.

Sensing method: Passive acoustic homing systems use hydrophones or microphones to detect and analyze sounds emitted from the target. It may be designed to listen for certain types of sounds to the exclusion of others.

Strengths: Passive acoustic homing does not emit signals of its own and is therefore less detectable by the target. It is effective in tracking acoustic targets that produce sound, even in noisy environments.

Limitations: Passive acoustic homing may have difficulties detecting silent targets or targets using stealth technology to reduce acoustic emissions. It also may have reduced accuracy in challenging conditions.

Uses: Passive acoustic homing is commonly used in underwater surveillance and marine research.

== Applications ==
Acoustic homing can be used in:

Sonar Systems: Acoustic homing is used in many underwater sonar systems, such as on submarines, ships, and fish finders. These systems use sound waves to detect underwater objects, as well as measure the object's distance and determine the object's relative position.

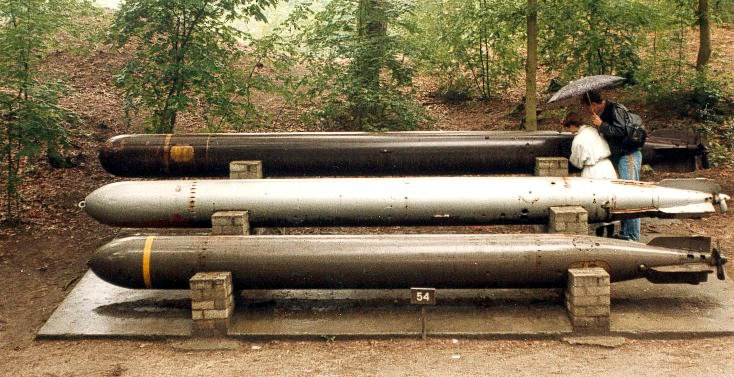
Multiple German G7e torpedoes that use acoustic homing

Guided Missiles: Some guided missiles, such as acoustic torpedoes, use acoustic homing to detect and home in on the sound generated by a specified target, such as an aircraft engine or a ship's propellers.

Search and Rescue: Acoustic homing is sometimes used in search and rescue operations to locate distress signals. Some examples of these

distress signals include emergency beacons and devices carried by people stranded at sea or in remote areas.

Vehicle Navigation: Many autonomous underwater vehicles(AUVs) and underwater drones use acoustic homing to navigate as well as locate underwater features or waypoints. Autonomous surface vehicles(ASVs) can also use acoustic homing to navigate.

Wildlife Tracking: Scientists use acoustic homing to monitor and study wildlife in natural habitats. This is done by attaching acoustic transmitters to animals and then using receivers to monitor their movements and behavior.

Mines Detection: Acoustic homing can be used to detect and avoid buried antitank mines during warfare.

Mines: Some underwater mines also make use of acoustic homing, where the mines would be triggered and detonate after detecting passing ships or submarines.

== See also ==
- Acoustic quieting
- Acoustic Torpedo
- Guidance System
- Sonar
