= Nuclear torpedo =

Underwater weapon carrying a nuclear warhead

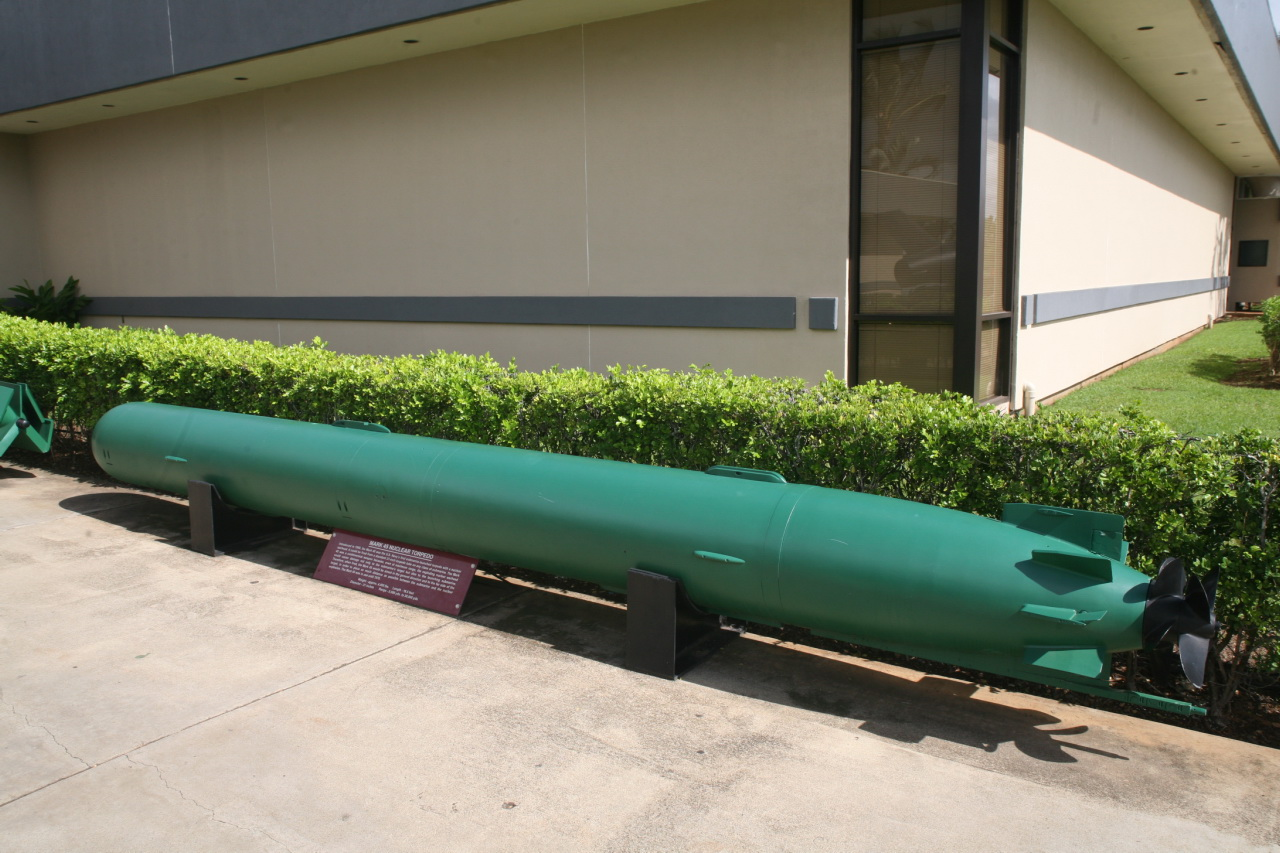
The nuclear US Mark 45 anti-submarine torpedo

A nuclear torpedo is a torpedo armed with a nuclear warhead. The idea behind equipping a torpedo with a nuclear warhead was to create a much bigger explosive blast. Later analysis suggested that smaller, more accurate, and faster torpedoes were more efficient and effective.

During the Cold War, nuclear torpedoes replaced some conventionally armed torpedoes on submarines of both the Soviet and American navies.

The USSR developed the T15, the T5 and the ASB-30. The only nuclear warhead torpedo used by the United States was the Mark 45 torpedo. The Soviet Union widely deployed T5 nuclear torpedoes in 1958 and the U.S. deployed its Mark 45 torpedo in 1963. In 2015, there were rumors that Russia was developing a new nuclear torpedo, the Status-6.

== Soviet Union ==
=== T-15 ===
The Soviet Union's development of nuclear weapons began in the late 1940s. The Navy had put itself forward as the most suitable branch of the Soviet armed forces to deliver a nuclear strike, believing its submarine technology and tactics to be superior to the rest of the world. In theory, long-range submarines that can surface just prior to launching a nuclear weapon offer a large tactical advantage in comparison to deploying weapons by long range bomber planes that can be shot down.

In the early 1950s, the Soviet Ministry of Medium Machine Building secretly initiated plans for incorporating nuclear warheads into submarine warfare. One concept, the T-15 project, aimed to provide a nuclear warhead with a diameter of 1,550 mm (61 in), which was completely incompatible with the traditional caliber torpedo already used in Soviet diesel-powered submarines. The T-15 project began in strict secrecy in 1951. Research and testing was contemporaneous with the other concept, the much smaller and lighter 533 mm (21.0 in) torpedo referred to as the T-5. Stalin and the armed forces saw benefits to both calibers of torpedo: the T-5 was a superior tactical option, but the T-15 had a larger blast. Meetings at the Kremlin were so highly classified that the Navy was not informed. The plans for the T-15 torpedo and for an appropriately redesigned submarine, named project 627, were authorized on September 12, 1952, but were not officially approved until 1953, surprising the Navy, which had been unaware of the central government activity. The T-15 project developed a torpedo that could travel 16 miles (26 km) with a thermonuclear warhead. The 1550 mm T-15 design was 1.5 m (5 ft) in diameter and weighed 36,000 kg (40 short tons). The large size of the weapon limited the capacity of a modified submarine to a single torpedo that could only travel at a speed of 56 km/h (30 kn). The torpedo speed was hindered by the usage of an electric propelled motor to launch the warhead.

==== Discontinuation ====
The T-15 was intended to destroy naval bases and coastal towns by an underwater explosion that resulted in massive tsunami waves. The front compartment of the T-15 submarines held the massive torpedo, which occupied 22% of the length of the submarine. A submarine could only hold one T-15 at a time, but it was also equipped with two 533-mm torpedo tubes intended for self-defense. In 1953, the T-15 project presented its conclusions to the Central Council of the Communist Party, where it was determined that the project would be managed by the Navy. In 1954, a committee of naval experts disagreed with continuing the T-15 nuclear torpedoes. Their criticisms centered on a lack of need when considered along with existing weapons in the submarine fleet, as well as skepticism that submarines would be able to approach launch points close enough to the coastline to hit targets within 40 km (25 mi).

Project 627 was modified to provide reactors for a new vessel that would be capable of deploying 533 mm caliber torpedoes in the T-5 project. However, the termination of the T-15 program in 1954 was not the last time a large torpedo would be considered as means of deployment. In 1961, Andrei Sakharov revisited the idea after the successful testing of his new 52 megaton bomb, which was too large for aircraft. When he introduced the concept to the navy they did not welcome the idea, being turned off by the wide area effect which would kill so many innocent people. Technological advances led to the weapon selection process favoring more tactical approaches that were amenable to quicker execution. After years of decline and reduction of stockpiles the Russian Federation in recent years seems to tend to lean toward an increase of its stockpile in terms of quantity and yield of nuclear weapons.

=== T-5 ===
From the early 1950s, when the Soviets succeeded in engineering atomic bombs of their own, an effective means of delivery was sought. The T-5 torpedo carried an RDS-9 nuclear warhead with a yield of 5 kilotons. The first test of this warhead on the Semipalatinsk nuclear proving ground in Kazakhstan on 10 October 1954 was unsuccessful. A year later, after further development, a test on Novaya Zemlya on 21 September 1955 succeeded. On 10 October 1957, in another test on Novaya Zemlya, the Whiskey class submarine S-144 launched a live T-5 nuclear torpedo. The test weapon, code named Korall, detonated with a yield of 4.8 kilotons 20 m (66 ft) under the surface of the bay, sending a huge plume of highly radioactive water high into the air. Three decommissioned submarines were used as targets at a distance of 10.5 km (6.5 mi). Both S-20 and S-34 sank while S-19 received critical damage.

In 1958, the T-5 became fully operational as the Type 53-58 torpedo. The weapon, which could be deployed on most Soviet submarines, had an interchangeable warhead for either nuclear or high explosive. This permitted quick tactical decisions on deployment. The T-5, like the US Mark 45 torpedo, was not designed to make direct hits but to maximize a blast kill zone in the water. The detonation would create shock waves powerful enough to crack the hull of a submerged submarine. However, like the U.S. Mark 45 torpedo, the T-5 was not optimized for deep diving and had limited guidance capability. As its thermal operational range was between 5 and 25 °C (41 and 77 °F), this decreased its effectiveness in the waters of the North Atlantic and Arctic.

On 27 October 1962, at the height of the Cuban Missile Crisis, the Soviet submarine B-59 was pursued in the Atlantic Ocean by the U.S. Navy. When the Soviet vessel failed to surface after broadcast communications, the destroyer USS Beale began dropping signaling depth charges as a warning to surface. The B-59 was armed with a T-5. The Soviet captain was not aware of this recent US to Soviet submarine signal instruction and believing that World War III was under way wished to launch the nuclear weapon. However, his flotilla commander, Vasili Arkhipov, who was using the boat as his command vessel, refused to endorse the command. After an argument, it was agreed that the submarine would surface and await orders from Moscow. It was not until after the fall of the Soviet Union that it was made known that the submarine was armed with a T-5. A fictional Soviet nuclear torpedo was deployed in the 1965 Cold War film The Bedford Incident.

=== ASB-30 ===
The ASB-30 was a nuclear warhead, deployed by the Soviet Navy in 1962, which could replace high-explosive warheads on 533 mm (21-inch) torpedoes while the submarine was at sea.

=== VA-111 Shkval ===
The supercavitating VA-111 Shkval torpedo is allegedly able to carry nuclear warheads.

== Russian Federation ==
=== Status-6 ===
In 2015, information emerged that Russia may be developing a new up to 100 MT thermonuclear torpedo, the Status-6 Oceanic Multipurpose System, codenamed "Kanyon" by Pentagon officials. This weapon is designed to create a tsunami wave up to 500 m (1,600 ft) tall that will radioactively contaminate a wide area on an enemy coasts with cobalt-60, and to be immune to anti-missile defense systems such as anti-ballistic missiles, laser weapons and railguns that might disable an ICBM or a SLBM. Two potential carrier submarines, the Project 09852 Oscar-class submarine Belgorod, and the Project 09851 Yasen-class submarine Khabarovsk, are new boats laid down in 2012 and 2014 respectively. Status 6 appears to be a deterrent weapon of last resort. It appears to be a torpedo-shaped robotic mini-submarine, that can travel at speeds of 190 km/h (100 kn). More recent information suggests a top speed of 104 km/h (56 kn), with a range of 10,000 km (6,200 mi) and a depth maximum of 1,000 m (3,300 ft). This underwater drone is cloaked by stealth technology to elude acoustic tracking devices. However many commentators doubt that this is a real project, and see it as more likely to be a staged leak to intimidate the US. Amongst other comments on it, Edward Moore Geist wrote a paper in which he says that "Russian decision makers would have little confidence that these areas would be in the intended locations" and Russian military experts are cited as saying that "Robotic torpedo shown could have other purposes, such as delivering deep-sea equipment or installing surveillance devices".

In January 2018 the Pentagon confirmed the existence of Status-6.

== United States ==
=== Rationale ===
U.S. interest in a nuclear torpedo can be traced to 1943, when Captain William S. Parsons, head of the ordnance division of the Manhattan Project, proposed an air-launched uranium-type nuclear warhead torpedo. This concept never advanced. It was not until the late 1950s, when deep-diving, fast Soviet nuclear submarines appeared, that heavier weaponry was needed. In 1960, the United States revealed its development of nuclear warheads that could be dropped from the delta-winged Convair B-58 Hustler, the first operational supersonic bomber, over target points detected by sonar systems.

=== Mark 45 ===
The Mark 45 torpedo, also known as ASTOR, was a United States Navy (USN) nuclear weapon. The Mark 45 replaced the Mark 44 torpedo, which was appreciably smaller, weighing about 193 kg (425 lb) and 250 cm (100 in) in length. The Mark 44 range was around 5,500 m (6,000 yd) and it could reach speeds of 56 km/h (30 kn). The initial design of the Mark 45 was undertaken in 1959 or 1960 by the Applied Research Laboratory, University of Washington, Seattle, Wash., and the Westinghouse Electric Corp., Baltimore, Md. The torpedo entered service in 1963.

The Mark 45 was a submarine-launched, antisubmarine, antisurface ship torpedo with wire guidance capabilities. The warhead was a W34 low-yield tactical nuclear warhead, whose extensive blast radius would destroy an enemy boat by a proximity detonation, rather than precision delivery. To ensure full control was maintained over the nuclear weapon, a wire control carried out the detonation. The warhead was detonated only by a signal sent along the wire; there was no contact or influence exploder in the torpedo. Target guidance signals, informed by a gyro and depth gear, could also be sent via the wire connection, as the torpedo had no onboard homing ability. It was 480 mm (19 in) in diameter, and was launched silently from a standard 530 mm (21 in) tube by allowing it to swim out. It was 580 cm (227 in) and weighed 1,000 to 1,100 kg (2,300 to 2,400 lb). There were 2 mods of the Mark 45. The first one, mod 0, was the original nuclear armed version. Mod 1 was a conventionally armed version, refitted from retired mod 0 versions and offered for sale to allied navies as the Mk45 Mod 1 Freedom torpedo. The nuclear warhead offered a large explosion that could destroy high speed, deep diving submarines. Powered by a seawater battery and a 160 ehp electric motor, it could reach 74 km/h (40 kn) and had a maximum range of 14,000 m (15,000 yd). Approximately 600 Mark 45 torpedoes were built from 1963 to 1976.

=== Replacement ===
The size and weight of the Mark 45's nuclear warhead greatly interfered with the speed the torpedo could reach. From 1972 to 1976, the Mark 45 was replaced by the Mark 48 torpedo, the current USN submarine torpedo.

The decommissioned Mark 45 torpedoes were refashioned, replacing the nuclear warheads with conventional warheads. These "Freedom" torpedoes were offered for foreign sale without much success.

Weapon	Type	Range (yards)	Speed (knots)	Warhead
Mk 37	torpedo	8,000–18,000	various	330 lb HBX-3
Mk 45	torpedo	30,000–40,000	various	nuclear capable
Mk 48	torpedo	30,000–40,000	various	800 lb HBX-3
Mk 48 ADCAP	torpedo	30,000–40,000	various	800 lb HBX-3
Subroc UUM-44	rocket	30 nm	N/A	nuclear capable
UGM 84a/c	anti-ship missile	75 nm	600	488 lb WDU18

== Cuban Missile Crisis ==
At the time of the Cuban Missile Crisis, the U.S. was unaware that the U.S.S.R. possessed nuclear-armed-torpedoes. Before the crisis, the U.S. had been stalking and documenting most Soviet submarines. During the crisis, the U.S. imposed a blockade to eradicate all Soviet presence in the Caribbean Sea. A dangerous incident may have occurred on Soviet submarine B-59, although some doubts have been raised. Vadim Orlov, who was a communications intelligence officer, stated that on 27 October, U.S. destroyers lobbed practice depth charges at B-59. Captain Valentin Savitsky, unable to establish communications with Moscow, with a crew suffering from heat and high levels of carbon dioxide, ordered the T5 nuclear torpedo to be assembled for firing. The Deputy Brigade Commander Second Captain Vasili Arkhipov calmed Savitsky down and they made the decision to surface the submarine. This narrative is controversial, as other submarine commanders have found it improbable that Savitsky would have given such an order.

== See also ==
- Shock factor
- Underwater explosion
- Nuclear depth bomb
- Supercavitation
- List of supercavitating torpedoes
- List of torpedoes by name
