= Project Nobska =

1956 study by the US Navy on anti-submarine and nuclear weapons

- Date: 18 June – 15 September 1956
- Location: Woods Hole, Massachusetts; 41°31′00″N 70°39′20″W
- Also known as: Nobska study
- Type: US Navy and interagency conference/summer study
- Theme: Submarine and antisubmarine warfare
- Cause: Introduction of nuclear-powered submarines
- Patron: Chief of Naval Operations Admiral Arleigh Burke
- Organised by: Committee on Undersea Warfare of the National Academy of Sciences
- Participants: 73 representatives from US government organizations concerned with submarine warfare
- Outcome: Approval of new submarine arrangement for better sonar capability; New anti-submarine torpedoes (Mark 46 and Mark 48); Submarine tactical nuclear weapons (Mark 45 torpedo and SUBROC); Concentration on Polaris missile program as US Navy strategic deterrent

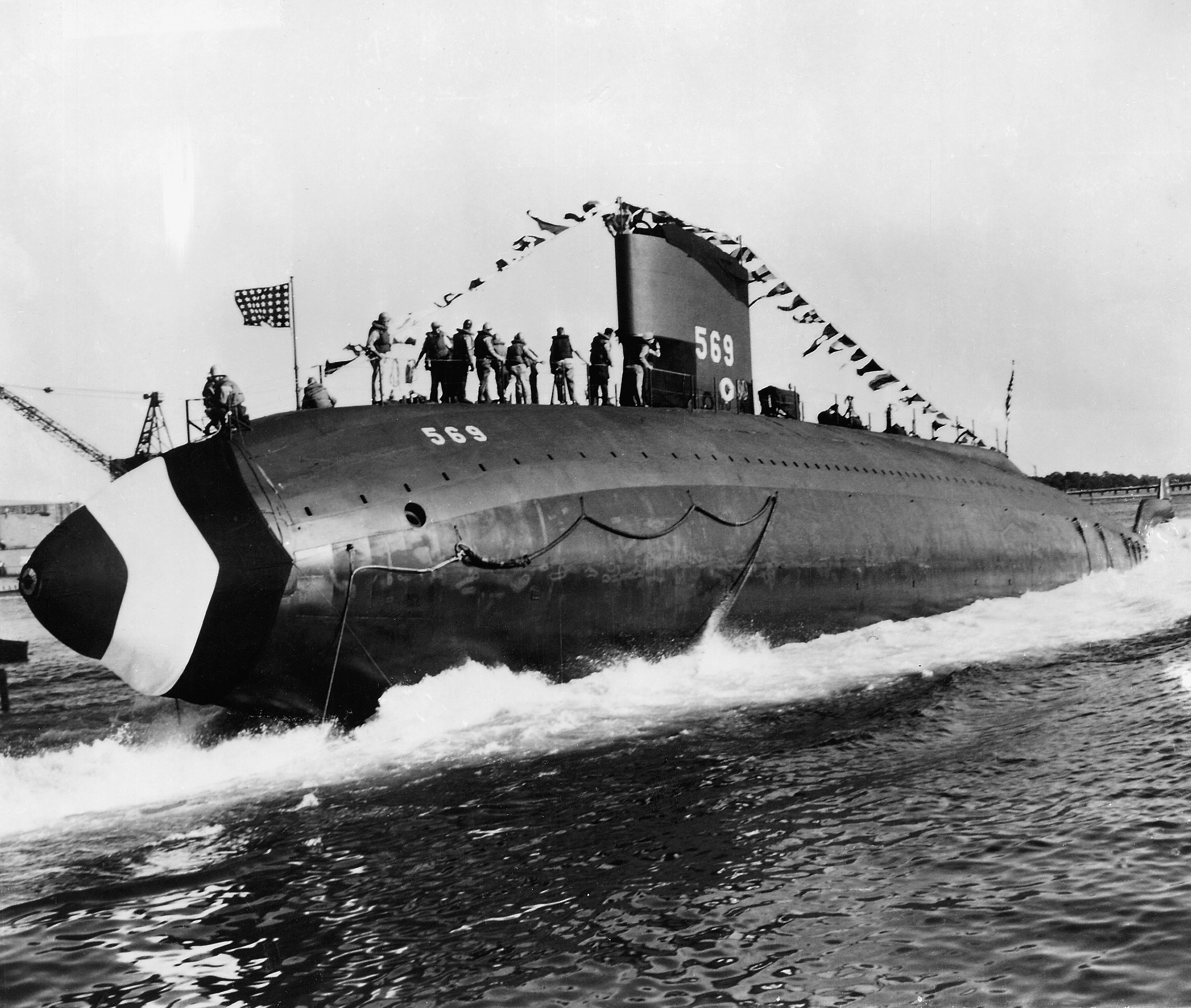
The launch of the submarine USS Albacore (AGSS-569) on August 1, 1953

Project Nobska was a 1956 summer study on anti-submarine warfare (ASW) for the United States Navy ordered by Chief of Naval Operations Admiral Arleigh Burke. It is also referred to as the Nobska Study, named for its location on Nobska Point near the Woods Hole Oceanographic Institution (WHOI) on Cape Cod, Massachusetts. The focus was on the ASW implications of nuclear submarines, particularly on new technologies to defend against them. The study was coordinated by the Committee on Undersea Warfare (CUW) of the National Academy of Sciences (NAS).

It was notable for including 73 representatives from numerous organizations involved in submarine design, submarine-related fields, and weapons design, including senior scientists from the Atomic Energy Commission's nuclear weapons laboratories. Among the participants were Nobel laureate Isidor Rabi, Paul Nitze, and Edward Teller. The study's recommendations influenced all subsequent US Navy submarine designs, as well as submarine-launched ASW tactical nuclear weapons until this weapon type was phased out in the late 1980s. New lightweight (Mark 46) and heavyweight (Mark 48) anti-submarine torpedo programs were approved.

Although not on the initial agenda, Teller noted that new lightweight nuclear warheads would be available, which would make the Polaris submarine-launched ballistic missile (SLBM) possible. Within five years Polaris would dramatically improve the US Navy's strategic nuclear deterrent capability.

== Background ==
USS Nautilus (SSN-571), the world’s first nuclear-powered submarine (SSN), became operational in 1955. The nuclear submarine could maintain a high speed at deep depths indefinitely, creating a more difficult ASW problem than any previous type of submarine, as was shown in Nautilus' first exercises. Within a few years, more exercises would show that other SSNs had difficulty detecting and tracking an attacking SSN in time to launch a counterattack. Future SSNs would be even faster, as the fully streamlined conventional USS Albacore (AGSS-569) was already demonstrating.

It was expected that the Soviet Union would have its own SSN within a few years, as it had produced its own atomic bomb, hydrogen bomb, and advanced conventional submarines only a few years behind their development in other countries. As it turned out, the Soviet Navy was only three years behind the USN with their first nuclear-powered submarine.

Various ASW technologies and weapons, including new surface ship and submarine sonars, SOSUS, ASROC, the Mark 45 nuclear torpedo, and "Stinger" (later SUBROC) were in development. Columbus Iselin II, director of WHOI, suggested to Admiral Burke that an inter-agency study was necessary to determine the best approach in each area, and probably also to improve coordination among the numerous offices pursuing the problem. The study ran from 18 June through 15 September 1956, and the final report was released on 1 December 1956.

== Key findings ==
The final report explored the ways that oceanography influenced the ASW problem, noted that all Soviet submarine bases required long transits in shallow waters to operating areas, and recommended that active as well as passive sonar be explored for improved implementation. The Mark 45 nuclear torpedo was among the systems recommended for further development, as was "Stinger" (later SUBROC). The Mark 45 torpedo was the first USN submarine tactical nuclear weapon, entering service in 1959. SUBROC was a submarine-launched short-range ballistic missile that carried a nuclear depth bomb; it was deployed in 1965. ASROC does not appear in summaries of Nobska recommendations; however, it became the primary ASW weapon of USN surface combatants.

Although references do not make a direct link, the radical redesign of the internal US Navy SSN arrangement between the Skipjack and Thresher classes is often attributed to Nobska. It was proposed by the Naval Underwater Systems Center the month the Nobska report was published. This involved placing a large sonar sphere in the bow of a teardrop-hulled, fully streamlined submarine. The sphere allowed three-dimensional sonar operation for greater detection range. To make room for the sphere, the torpedo tubes were relocated to a midships position and angled outboard. The first submarine with this arrangement was the one-off Tullibee in 1961, followed that same year by Thresher. This arrangement has been used by all subsequent US Navy attack submarine classes, and was also adopted for the Ohio-class missile submarines.

The foundation of future USN torpedo design was laid at Nobska. One conclusion reached was that fast homing torpedoes were possible. The research torpedo configuration (RETORC) program commenced soon after the conference. RETORC I, a lightweight design, resulted in the Mark 46 torpedo, which entered service in 1963. Its heavyweight counterpart, RETORC II, was developed into the Mark 48 torpedo, which entered service in 1971. With modifications, the Mark 46 and Mark 48 remain the standard US Navy torpedoes today.

=== Focus on Polaris missile program ===
An important milestone in the Polaris missile program was inadvertently achieved at Nobska. In the course of discussing how a nuclear warhead could be made small enough for the Mark 45 torpedo, Edward Teller of Lawrence Livermore National Laboratory started a discussion on the possibility of developing a physically small one-megaton nuclear warhead for the Polaris missile, with Admiral Burke present. His counterpart in the discussion, J. Carson Mark of Los Alamos National Laboratory, at first insisted it could not be done. However, Dr. Mark eventually stated that a half-megaton warhead of small enough size could be developed. This yield, roughly thirty times that of the Hiroshima bomb, was enough for Admiral Burke, and Navy strategic missile development shifted from Jupiter to Polaris by the end of the year. Within five years regular Polaris deterrent patrols were in progress.

=== Recommendations not implemented ===
Nobska recommendations that were not implemented included a small 500-ton SSN (to allow large numbers to be built quickly) and a nuclear-powered destroyer escort (DEN). A small fuel cell-powered submarine, possibly with a reactor to heat the fuel cells, was also considered. However, both the small SSN and the DEN were dependent on leveraging high power-to-weight reactors from the developmental nuclear-powered aircraft program, and these reactors were never successfully developed. Fuel cell technology was insufficiently developed to be practical at the time. A sketch design for the DEN was produced in 1958, with a guided missile variant including the Tartar missile. However, it was eventually decided to generally limit surface combatant nuclear power to nuclear-powered guided missile frigates (DLGN) (redesignated in 1975 as nuclear-powered guided missile cruisers [CGN]).

== See also ==
- Submarine
- Nuclear submarine
- Attack submarine
- Submarine-launched ballistic missile
