= Mark 45 torpedo =

Nuclear antisubmarine torpedo

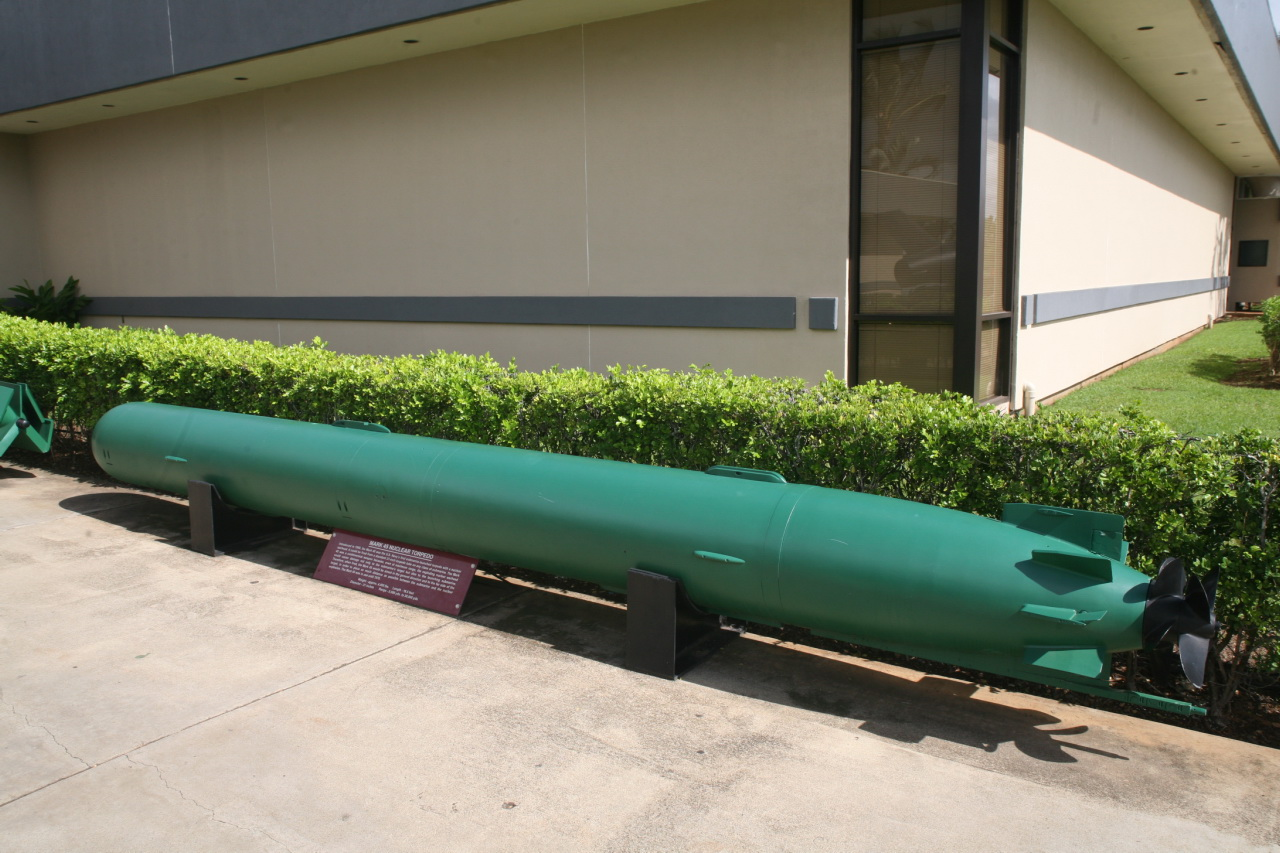
- Mark 45 torpedo on display in Aiea, Hawaii, United States
- Type: Nuclear antisubmarine torpedo
- Place of origin: United States

Service history
- In service: 1958–1977
- Used by: United States Navy

Production history
- Designer: Applied Research Laboratory, University of Washington; Westinghouse Electric
- Designed: 1957
- Manufacturer: Westinghouse Electric
- Produced: 1958
- No. built: 600
- Variants: Mark 45 Mod 0 Mark 45 Mod 1 Mark 45 Mod 2 Mark 45 Freedom

Specifications
- Mass: 2,330 lb (1,060 kg) Mk 45 Mod 0; 2,213 lb (1,004 kg) Mk 45 Mods 1 and 2; 2,555 lb (1,159 kg) Mk 45F Mods 0 and 1
- Length: 225 inches (5.72 m) Mk 45 Mod 0, Mk 45F Mods 0 and 1; 227 inches (5.77 m) Mk 45 Mods 1 and 2
- Diameter: 19 inches (483 mm)
- Warhead: W34 nuclear warhead
- Blast yield: 11 kilotons Mod 0; 9 kilotons Mods 1 and 2
- Engine: Electric
- Operational range: 11,000 to 15,000 yards (10 to 14 km)
- Maximum speed: 40 kn (74 km/h)
- Guidance system: Gyroscope and wire
- Launch platform: Submarines

The Mark 45 anti-submarine torpedo, a.k.a. ASTOR, was a submarine-launched wire-guided nuclear torpedo designed by the United States Navy for use against high-speed, deep-diving, enemy submarines. This was one of several weapons recommended for implementation by Project Nobska, a 1956 summer study on submarine warfare. The 19-inch (483 mm) torpedo was fitted with a W34 nuclear warhead. The need to maintain direct control over the warhead meant that a wire connection had to be maintained between the torpedo and submarine until detonation. Wire guidance systems were piggybacked onto this cable, and the torpedo had no homing capability. The design was completed in 1957, and 600 torpedoes were built before 1976, whereupon ASTOR was replaced by the Mark 48 torpedo.

== Design ==
This electrically propelled, 19-inch (483 mm) diameter torpedo was 225 or 227 inches (5.72 or 5.77 m) long, with an approximate mass of 2,300 pounds (1,000 kg). The W34 nuclear warhead used in the Mark 45 Mod 0 had a nominal yield of 11 kilotons; the warhead of the Mark 45 Mod 2, likely also the Mod 1, had a reduced yield of 9 kilotons. The requirement for positive control of nuclear warheads meant that ASTOR could only be detonated by a deliberate signal from the firing submarine, which necessitated a wire link. Due to the extreme destructive power of the weapon's payload, it was not necessary for the weapon to physically contact or even be in the immediate proximity of the target; it merely needed to be in the approximate vicinity of the target, or even multiple targets. Consequently the weapon was unpopular with USN submarine crews, widely referred to as having a pK of 2, i.e. both the target and the launching submarine. In reality, this was an exaggeration, because the Mark 90 Betty nuclear depth charge, with a much greater yield of 32 kilotons, was estimated as having a submarine kill radius of approximately 1.3 nautical miles (2 km) around the epicenter, much less than the maximal range of the ASTOR guidance wire. The ASTOR had a range of approximately 5.5 to 7.5 nautical miles. The wire guidance system of the weapon was derived from the one developed for the Mark 39, alongside the Mark 37 Mod 1. As such, the afterbody section and empennage of the Mark 45 shared numerous design elements with both the Mark 39 and Mark 37.

The Mark 45 Mod 0 had no homing capability and was designed to be manually piloted via wire link to the approximate vicinity of a target, both target and torpedo being tracked by sonar, with the detonation signal likewise being transmitted manually. Mark 45 Mod 1 and Mod 2 ostensibly were equipped with the Mark 102 Mod 0 fire control system (erroneously claimed as the nuclear payload in at least one reference), which suggests that they possessed acoustic homing similar to that employed by the Mark 37.

By replacing the nuclear warhead with a conventional one, the torpedo could be reconfigured as a conventional weapon. This would eventually be attempted following the retirement of the Mark 45, with the Mark 45 Freedom variant.

== History ==
Production of ASTOR began in 1958 and it entered service soon thereafter. Approximately 600 torpedoes were built by 1976, when the torpedo was replaced by the Mark 48 torpedo. After decommissioning, the Mark 45 was marketed by Westinghouse for export sale to foreign navies. The weapon had been fitted with a conventional warhead and acoustic guidance, including wake homing, marketed as the Mark 45 Freedom torpedo. Several prototypes were produced, but none were sold. According to operations logs dated to 1973, Mark 45 Mod 2 was in service with the USN, which logically infers that neither the Mod 2 nor its predecessor Mod 1 were the post-decommissioning Mark 45 Freedom.

The prototype Mark 45 Freedom (variously Mk-45-F) existed in two modifications - a Mod 0 and a Mod 1. Both versions had a mass of 2,555 lb (1,159 kg) and a length of 225 inches (5.72 m). Both versions possessed wire guidance and acoustic homing, with the Mod 1 being additionally capable of wake homing. Range was 5 to 8 nautical miles. The Mark 45F never served with the USN, having been superseded by the Mark 48.

The USS Scorpion, a Skipjack class submarine which was lost with all hands in 1968, contained two Mark 45 ASTOR torpedoes. Both units remain at the wreck site.

== See also ==
- American 21-inch torpedo
