= Soviet submarine B-59 =

Submarine whose onboard situation could have started World War III

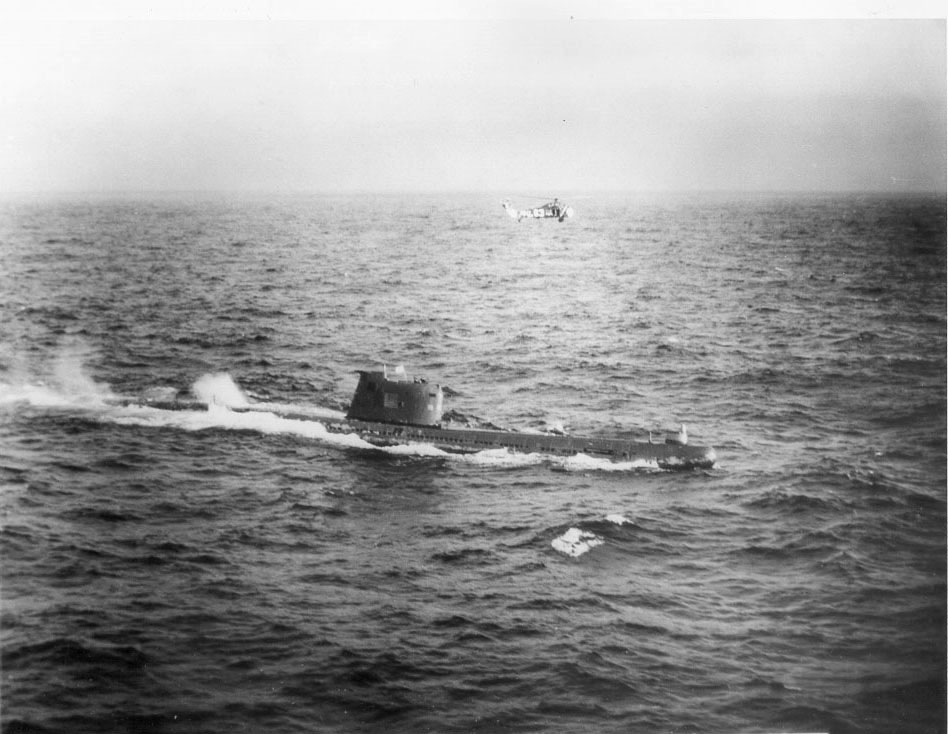
- B-59 near Cuba with a US Navy helicopter circling above, c. October 28–29, 1962

History

Soviet Union
- Name: B-59
- Builder: Admiralty Shipyard
- Laid down: 21 February 1960
- Launched: 11 June 1960
- Commissioned: 6 October 1961
- Decommissioned: 19 April 1990

General characteristics
- Class & type: Foxtrot-class submarine
- Displacement: Surfaced: 1,957 long tons (1,988 t); Submerged: 2,475 long tons (2,515 t)
- Length: 91.3 m (299 ft 6 in)
- Beam: 7.5 m (24 ft 7 in)
- Propulsion: 3 × 2,000 hp (1,500 kW) (diesel); 3 × 2,700 hp (2,000 kW) (electric); 3 shafts
- Speed: Surfaced: 16.8 knots (31.1 km/h); Submerged: 16 knots (30 km/h)
- Range: Surfaced: 17,900 nmi (33,200 km), at 8 kn (9.2 mph; 15 km/h); Submerged: 400 nmi (740 km), at 2 kn (2.3 mph; 3.7 km/h)
- Complement: 70
- Armament: 10 torpedo tubes; 22 torpedoes, including one nuclear torpedo with a 10 kt warhead

Soviet submarine B-59 (Russian: Б-59) was a Project 641 or Foxtrot-class diesel-electric submarine of the Soviet Navy. B-59 was stationed near Cuba during the 13-day Cuban Missile Crisis of October 1962 and was pursued and harassed by United States Navy vessels. Senior officers in the submarine, out of contact with Moscow and the rest of the world and believing they were under attack and possibly at war, came close to firing a T-5 nuclear torpedo at the US ships.

== Cuban Missile Crisis ==
On the night of October 1, 1962, B-59, the flagship of a detachment of sister ships B-4, B-36 and B-130, departed secretly from its base on the Kola Peninsula for the Cuban port of Mariel, close to Havana, where it was intended to establish a Soviet naval base. The submarines, built in Leningrad in 1959–1961 and said at the time to be "the best in the world", had a range of up to 26,000 miles and were each armed with 22 torpedoes, one of which had a nuclear warhead. They were sent to the Caribbean Sea in support of Soviet arms deliveries to Cuba in an operation known to the Soviets as Anadyr, which had been in preparation since March/April. The arms deliveries consisted of nuclear missiles for which launch facilities had been prepared on Cuba. The discovery of this precipitated a major confrontation between the US and USSR after the submarine group had put to sea.

The submarines arrived at their assigned positions in the Sargasso Sea, east of Cuba, in the week beginning 20 October. US President Kennedy announced a blockade of Cuba on the evening of 22 October. The US was preparing a major airborne assault on the island. A radio interception group on B-59 heard Kennedy warn America that there was a possibility of thermonuclear conflict with the Soviet Union. The need for the utmost secrecy had been emphasised, but B-130 was forced to surface after all three of its engines broke down, which revealed the presence of the other submarines. The US Navy sent more than 200 combat surface ships, almost 200 shore-based aircraft and four aircraft carrier search and assault groups with 50–60 planes on each – 85 percent of its anti-submarine forces in the Atlantic – to search for them. Destroyers Barry, Lowry, Beale, Bache, Biddle, Eaton, Cony, Conway and Murray were charged with finding and destroying the submarines if military action became necessary.

The US Navy had an existing tactical protocol against diesel submarines called "hunt to exhaustion" which was similar to tactics used by the British in World War II. The Soviet submarines were pursued for several days and US Naval Command ordered that any submarine discovered in the area should be made to surface and be identified. Commanders of US ships were instructed to be ready to attack if a submarine refused to surface.

On October 27, after three days of searching, blockading units of the US Navy, an aircraft carrier-based search and attack group consisting of the aircraft carrier USS Randolph and destroyers using multi-frequency sonars, Julie sonobuoys, towed sono-locators, radio hydroacoustic buoys and "all means available", located B-59 off the coast of Cuba and used grenade explosions as a signal that it should surface. USS Cony, which first detected the sub, USS Beale and other destroyers began dropping signalling depth charges of the type used for naval training, which contained very little charge and were not intended to cause damage.

=== Nuclear close call ===
B-59 had not been in contact with Moscow for several days. The submarine's crew had been picking up US civilian radio broadcasts, but once they began attempting to hide from pursuers the vessel had to run too deep to monitor radio traffic and those on board did not know whether or not war had broken out. Conditions inside the vessel were becoming extremely difficult. The submarine had nine extra people on board, members of an OSNAZ radio interception group, with all their equipment. There was now only emergency lighting, the interior was overcrowded and unbearably hot, and the crew of 70 were short of drinking water and breathable air and suffering from lack of ventilation, high levels of CO_{2}, diesel fumes and increasingly high temperatures. Some were collapsing from heat stroke.

The submarine was under what seemed to be attack for about four hours. Fourteen surface vessels surrounded it and tightened the circle, dropping grenades which exploded close to the hull. When B-59 was finally hit with something stronger than depth charges, the captain, Valentin Grigoryevich Savitsky, who was by then "totally exhausted", became furiously angry and ordered the officer assigned to the nuclear torpedo to assemble it to battle readiness and load it into its tube. He is reported to have said, "Maybe the war has already started ... We're going to blast them now. We will die, but we will sink them all. We will not disgrace our navy." The situation inside the submarine and Savitsky's words were described later by naval intelligence officer Vadim Pavlovich Orlov, Commander of the Special Assignment [radio interception] Group on the submarine. (Orlov's account has been described as "controversial" and it has been stated that other submarine commanders did not believe that Savitsky would have issued this order.)

The three most senior officers on board B-59 were Captain Savitsky; the political officer Ivan Semyonovich Maslennikov; and Chief of Staff of the deployed submarine detachment Vasily Arkhipov, who was equal in rank to Savitsky but the more senior officer. They were only authorized to launch a nuclear weapon if all three agreed to do it. B-59 was the only sub in the flotilla that would have required the authorisation of three officers in order to fire the "special weapon". The other subs would only have required the captain and the political officer to approve the launch, but on B-59 Arkhipov's position as detachment commander meant that he also had to give his consent. Of the three men, Arkhipov alone opposed the launch, and he persuaded Savitsky to surface and await orders from Moscow.

The submarine's batteries had run very low and its air-conditioning had failed and eventually, late in the evening of October 27, B-59 had to surface. It surfaced amid the US warships that were pursuing it and was immediately subjected to intense harassment with searchlights and what appeared to be mock attacks from planes and helicopters from the Randolph. The submarine made contact with the destroyer USS Cony and after discussions with the ship, B-59 was ordered by the Soviet fleet to set course back to the Soviet Union.

== Retrospective 2002 ==
At the Cuban Missile Crisis Conference in Havana in 2002, which marked its 40th anniversary, this was recognized for the first time as having been the most dangerous moment of the crisis. The Americans had not been aware that B-59 was armed with a nuclear torpedo, of roughly the power of the bomb which was dropped on Hiroshima. During the three-day conference, between October 11–13, 2002, which was sponsored by the private National Security Archive, Brown University and the Cuban government, Robert McNamara, Kennedy's Defence Secretary, said that nuclear war had come much closer than anyone had thought. Thomas Blanton, director of the National Security Archive, said Vasily Arkhipov had "saved the world".

Soviet documents about the incident are available online.

== See also ==
- Vasily Arkhipov
