= Mark 39 torpedo =

United States Navy torpedo

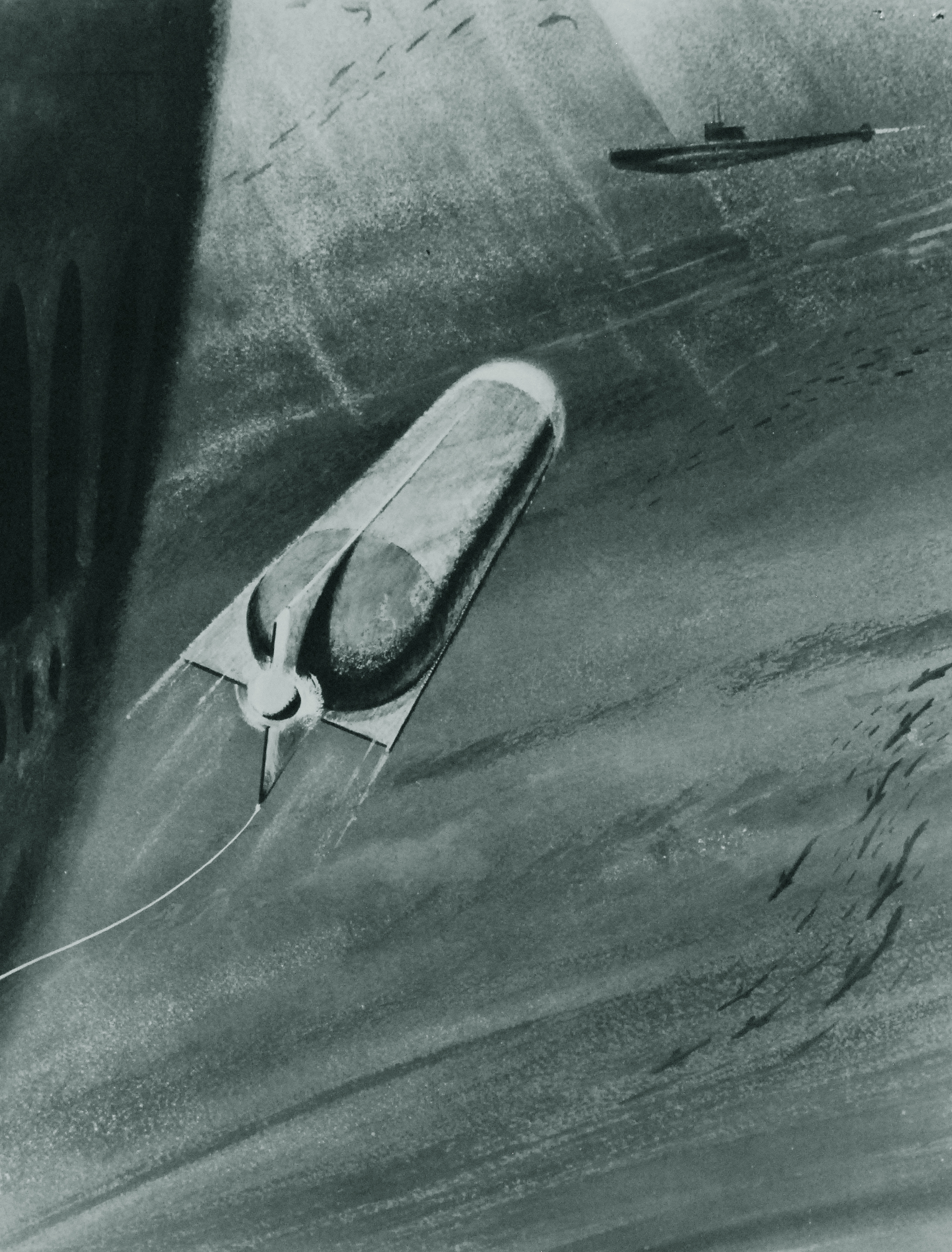
- Artist's impression of a USN Mark 39 wire-guided torpedo approaching a hostile submarine.
- Type: ASW Homing torpedo
- Place of origin: United States

Service history
- In service: 1946-1956
- Used by: United States Navy

Production history
- Designer: Vitro Corporation; Ordnance Research Laboratory, Pennsylvania State University
- Designed: 1946
- Manufacturer: Philco

Specifications
- Mass: 1275 pounds
- Length: 133 inches
- Diameter: 19 inches
- Effective firing range: 13000 yards (26-minute search duration)
- Warhead: Mk 39 Mod 0, HBX
- Warhead weight: 130 pounds
- Detonation mechanism: Mk 19 Mod 10 contact exploder
- Engine: Electric
- Maximum speed: 15.5 knots
- Guidance system: Wire
- Launch platform: Submarines

The Mark 39 torpedo was the first homing torpedo in United States Navy service to use a trailing wire for mid-course guidance through the submarine's fire control system. In 1946, shortly after the Mark 37 Mod 0 had been prototyped, the wire guidance system was reverse-engineered from the G7ef(TX) "Spinne" following the arrival of technical documentation from Germany. This resulted in the development of a wire-guided prototype the same year. The Mark 39 was a Mark 27 Mod 4 torpedo converted for development of wire guidance techniques, which were eventually incorporated into the Mark 37 Mod 1 and the Mark 45. Due to this development, the Mark 39 was considered obsolete and the remaining inventory was scrapped.

The initial production run consisted of 120 Mark 27 torpedoes converted to Mark 39 by Philco, with initial field deployment circa 1956 on seven of the GUPPY attack submarines. A total of approximately 3000 Mark 39 torpedoes would be ultimately produced. In operation, the weapon was used as a "bearing rider", tracked using the launching submarine's passive sonar and thereby kept to a particular bearing; a form of MCLOS guidance.
