= USS Beale (DD-471) =

Fletcher-class destroyer

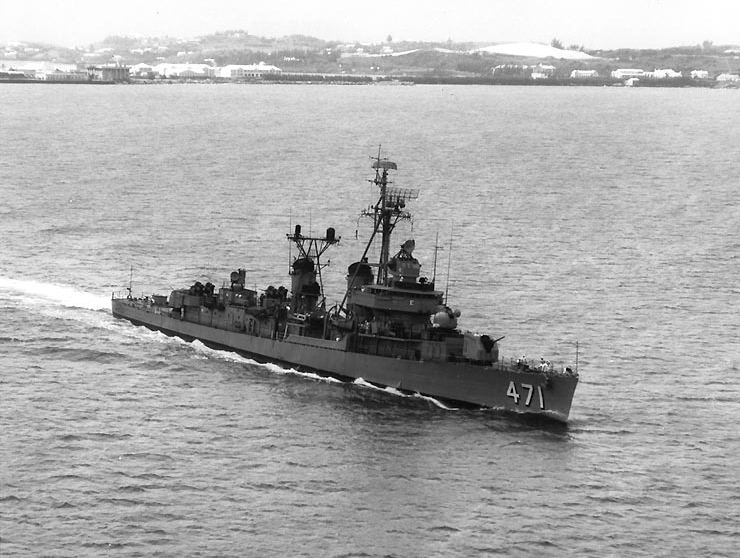
- USS Beale (DD-471) underway in harbor, 27 October 1964

History

United States
- Name: USS Beale
- Namesake: Edward Fitzgerald Beale
- Builder: Bethlehem Mariners Harbor, Staten Island, New York
- Laid down: 19 December 1941
- Launched: 24 August 1942
- Commissioned: 23 December 1942
- Decommissioned: 30 September 1968
- Stricken: 1 October 1968
- Fate: Sunk as target, 24 June 1969

General characteristics
- Class & type: Fletcher-class destroyer
- Displacement: 2,050 tons
- Length: 376 ft 6 in (114.7 m)
- Beam: 39 ft 8 in (12.1 m)
- Draft: 17 ft 9 in (5.4 m)
- Propulsion: 60,000 shp (45 MW); 2 propellers
- Speed: 35 knots (65 km/h; 40 mph)
- Range: 6500 nmi. (12,000 km) at 15 kt
- Complement: 329
- Armament: 5 × single Mk 12 5 in (127 mm)/38 guns; 5 × twin 40 mm (1.6 in) Bofors AA guns; 7 × single 20 mm (0.8 in) Oerlikon AA guns; 2 × quintuple 21 in (533 mm) torpedo tubes; 6 × single depth charge throwers; 2 × depth charge racks

USS Beale (DD/DDE-471), a Fletcher-class destroyer, was the second ship of the United States Navy to be named for Lieutenant Edward Fitzgerald Beale (1822–1893).

Beale was laid down on 19 December 1941 at Staten Island, New York, by the Bethlehem Steel Co., launched on 24 August 1942, sponsored by Miss Nancy Beale, a great-grandniece of LT Beale's, and commissioned on 23 December 1942 at the New York Navy Yard.

== World War II ==
=== 1943 ===
Early in January 1943, Beale began shakedown training off the coast of New England. Later that month, she continued that training in the West Indies near Guantanamo Bay, Cuba. In mid-February, the destroyer returned north to New York for a month of postshakedown repairs. She returned to sea on 15 March and headed back to the West Indies, where she served as antisubmarine escort and plane guard for the recently commissioned aircraft carrier Essex during her shakedown training near Trinidad. Beale completed another repair period at the New York Navy Yard between 10 and 21 March and then embarked upon the long voyage to the Pacific Ocean. Steaming by way of Norfolk, Virginia, she arrived at Cristóbal in the Panama Canal Zone on 22 April and transited the canal on the 28th.

The warship paused briefly at Balboa at the Pacific terminus of the canal before heading north toward the California coast that same day. She made an overnight stop at San Diego on 5-6 May before arriving in San Francisco on the 7 May. Five days later, Beale put to sea on her way to the Hawaiian Islands. She entered Pearl Harbor on 22 May and spent the next six weeks conducting antisubmarine warfare (ASW) and gunnery training in the local operating area. On 6 July, the destroyer departed Oahu on her way back to California. She arrived in San Diego on 11 July and remained there until the 19 July, when she put to sea to participate in amphibious exercises carried out near Monterey two days later. The following day, Beale steamed into San Francisco.

After a week's stay, she passed out of the Golden Gate again on 29 July and charted a course to the Aleutian Islands. On 5 August, the destroyer entered Kuluk Bay at Adak. Her tour of duty with the North Pacific Force lasted almost four months, but the only enemy she encountered was the foul climate. In mid-August, Beale's guns joined in the bombardment preparatory to the amphibious assault on Kiska. When the troops landed, however, they discovered that the effort had been in vain. The Japanese had abandoned the island almost three weeks previously. For the remainder of her assignment in the Aleutians, the warship continued to struggle against the elements while carrying out patrol and escort missions. At the end of November, the destroyer departed Dutch Harbor and shaped a course south to Hawaii. She stood into Pearl Harbor about a week later, but stayed only three days. When Beale resumed her voyage, she steered a course via Funafuti in the Ellice Islands and Espiritu Santo in the New Hebrides to Milne Bay, New Guinea. She reached her destination on 18 December. Beale spent the next seven months supporting General Douglas MacArthur's conquest of the northern coast of New Guinea and consequent isolation of the large Japanese bases in the Bismarck Archipelago at Rabaul on New Britain and Kavieng on New Ireland.

She wasted little time before getting into action. Just six days after her arrival, the destroyer was underway in company with an invasion force bound for Cape Gloucester on the western end of New Britain to secure the eastern flank of the vital Dampier Strait and Vitiaz Straits between that island and New Guinea. Her echelon, made up of seven tank landing ships (LSTs) escorted by three destroyers in addition to Beale, arrived off the objective early on the 26th, and the LSTs beached during the afternoon watch.

At around 14:30, a large formation of enemy planes attacked the Allied force off Cape Gloucester. Beale escaped damage, and her gunners claimed a kill on an Aichi D3A-1 "Val" dive bomber. Her good luck, however, eluded several of her colleagues. Brownson suffered direct hits from two bombs that touched off a huge explosion, and she sank in less than 20 minutes with a loss of 108 crewmembers. Shaw, a battle-scarred veteran of Pearl Harbor, received new wounds when a hail of fragments from several near misses riddled her hull and superstructure and injured over 30 of her crew, four of them fatally. Near misses also caused damage and a few casualties on board Mugford. Later that same day while escorting LST-466 in the vicinity of Borgen Bay, Beale encountered a Mitsubishi G4M "Betty" twin-engined medium bomber pursued by three Republic P-47 Thunderbolt fighters. Her gunners joined the fracas, and the "Betty" soon went into the sea about 2,000 yards (1,800 m) distant on her port bow.

=== 1944 ===
After that action, the destroyer retired to the vicinity of Buna Roads and Cape Sudest, on the eastern coast of New Guinea south of the Dampier and Vitiaz Straits, where she remained until the beginning of 1944. On New Year's Day 1944, Beale departed Buna and met with an assault force composed of nine high-speed transports (APDs), two LSTs, and several large landing craft with the 126th Regimental Combat Team of the U.S. Army's 32d Infantry Division embarked. Seven other destroyers joined Beale in the escort. The force steamed northwest through Vitiaz Strait to Saidor, New Guinea, where the soldiers streamed ashore unopposed on the morning of 2 January to secure the left flank of the straits through which General MacArthur's forces would pass constantly during their leapfrog up the back of the New Guinea hen. Beale and her compatriots in the screen contented themselves with antiair and antisubmarine patrols during the landings.

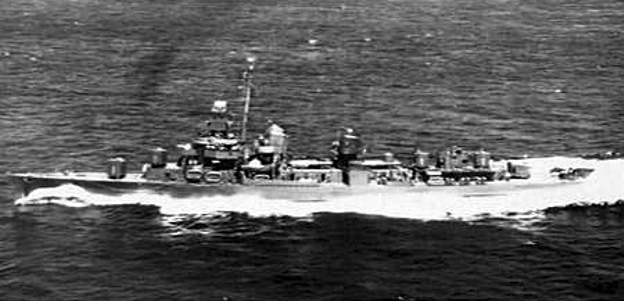
Beale in February 1944

For the next month, the warship divided her time between support for the Saidor operation and general patrol and escort missions along the New Guinea coast from Milne Bay to Saidor. On 5 February, Beale stood out of Milne Bay and set course for Sydney, Australia, where she carried out repairs from 9 to 23 February. Returning to Milne Bay on 27 February, she reported for duty with Task Force 74 (TF 74), a mixed force made up of American and Australian cruisers screened by American destroyers and commanded by Rear Admiral Victor A. C. Crutchley, VC, RN.

With both sides of the straits between New Guinea and New Britain free of Japanese interference, General MacArthur looked north to the Admiralty Islands, whose capture would further shield his right flank during the advance and provide an alternative base to heavily defended Rabaul. Accordingly, on 27 February, Beale and her colleagues in TF 74 stood out to sea from Cape Sudest, New Guinea, just ahead of a task force composed of APDs and destroyers with elements of the Army's 1st Cavalry Division embarked. The troops were to serve either as the initial invasion force if resistance in the Admiralties was sufficiently light or as a reconnaissance in force to be withdrawn if opposition proved too heavy.

Arriving off Los Negros Island about two hours into the morning watch of 29 February, Beale accompanied Nashville and Bache to a station north of Seeadler Harbor off Ndrilo Island to provide gunfire support for the landing force. At 07:40, her consorts and she opened fire on the island and continued to pound suspected enemy positions for about 15 minutes. The landing force's initial successes obviated the need for a second attack on the targets scheduled for the beginning of the forenoon watch. With all apparently going well ashore, the warship cleared the area with the rest of the task force, less two destroyers that remained behind to provide call fire, and steamed back to Cape Sudest.

On 4 March, she returned to the vicinity of the Admiralties with TF 74. After bombarding an enemy gun emplacement on Hauwei Island, her task force took up a patrol station about 30 miles (55 km) to the north of Manus. Beale remained on station with TF 74 for three days, guarding the approaches to the Admiralty Islands while the troops ashore consolidated their hold on Los Negros Island and moved over to Manus. On the 7 March, she made a visit to Hyane Harbor on Los Negros with Rear Admiral Russell S. Berkey embarked and then bombarded an enemy position on Moakareng Peninsula before rejoining the task force for the voyage back to Cape Sudest.

Following a week of gunnery drills and tactical exercises, Beale joined Ammen, Daly, Hutchins, and Mullany in an antishipping sweep along the northern coast of New Guinea that was highlighted by a bombardment of Japanese installations at Wewak on 19 March. She patrolled off Oro Bay, New Guinea, the next day before carrying out repairs there between 21 and 27 March. The destroyer conducted ASW exercises and more gunnery drills during the period 29 March to 8 April and then began another availability on 9 April at Milne Bay, New Guinea, that occupied her until the middle of the month.

Beale's return to combat came in mid-April during the three-pronged occupation of a portion of New Guinea's northern coast bounded by Tanamerah Bay in the west and Aitape in the east. The destroyer was assigned to Rear Admiral Russell S. Berkey's TF 75, built around light cruisers Phoenix, Nashville, and Boise and designated Covering Force "B" for the Hollandia mission. Her unit parted company with the main force about midnight on 21 April and reached its objective, Humboldt Bay, around 05:00 on 22 April. Around 06:00, Beale and her consorts commenced a 15-minute preliminary bombardment. Those efforts, as well as the contributions added by TF 58 aircraft, prompted most of the supposed defenders to abandon their assignment and head for safer surroundings. As a consequence of the enemy's headlong flight, the assault troops landed a seeming walkover, and Japanese resistance never really materialized.

With the landing's success assured, Beale cleared the area with Task Group 77.2 and arrived in Seeadler Harbor, Manus, the next day. After taking on fuel and provisions, the destroyer returned to sea on 26 April bound for the northern coast of New Guinea to resume support for the occupation of the region around Hollandia. She took up patrol station off Humboldt Bay on the morning of 27 April and, for the next several days, alternated between patrol duty, shore bombardment missions, and screening assignments with the aircraft carriers also supporting the troops ashore.

Early in May, the warship returned to Seeadler Harbor to prepare for the next step against New Guinea. Before embarking on that, however, she joined Abner Read and Bache to conduct a subsidiary mission in the vicinity of the bypassed Japanese base at Wewak, where enemy shore batteries were hampering the work of Aitape-based PT boats. On 9 May, the three destroyers departed Manus for Aitape, where on the 11th, they embarked four PT boat officers to help them locate the targets. Beale and her colleagues carried out their bombardment on the 12 May, returned the impromptu spotters to Aitape, and headed back to Manus.

Beale reentered Seeadler Harbor in time to complete preparations for the Wakde-Sarmi step oagainst New Guinea and sortie with the covering forces on 15 May. The destroyer and her colleagues took station off the objectives early on the morning of the 17th. After participating in the preinvasion bombardment, Hutchins and she conducted a fruitless search for enemy barges reported to be in the vicinity of Sarmi. At the conclusion of that mission, Beale headed for Humboldt Bay, where she arrived on the 18 May. She returned to the Wakde-Sarmi area on 21 May and patrolled to the north and west with TF 75, while the troops ashore consolidated their beachhead and prepared to move inland against a much more resolute defense than had been encountered at Hollandia. The fact that the defense was confined entirely to enemy ground forces allowed the Army to proceed on its own once the beachhead was fully secured and to release most of its naval support to participate in the next amphibious operation on New Guinea, the seizure of Biak, one of the Schouten Islands located just to the east of the head of the New Guinea bird.

Accordingly, Beale left the Wakde-Sarmi area and arrived back in Humboldt Bay on 24 May to join the Biak assault force. The following day, she returned to sea with that force to carry out the mission. Arriving off Biak on the 27th, the destroyer provided antisubmarine protection for the cruisers during their prelanding bombardment. After the landing, she moved in to bring her own guns to bear on enemy positions to assist the troops' movement inland. Beale patrolled off Biak until the end of May, guarding the assembled warships against the submarine threat and supplying occasional gunfire support.

After the invasion, the Japanese reversed their decision to leave Biak to its own devices and launched Operation Kon to reinforce the island's garrison. Beale returned to Humboldt Bay with TF 75 on 31 May to fuel and provision in preparation for the expected onslaught. On 7 June, the destroyer sortied from Humboldt Bay with TF 75 and shaped a course back to Biak. The cruiser-destroyer force took up station to the northeast of the island early in the evening of the 8th. An American patrol plane spotted the Japanese surface force attempting to bring reinforcements to Biak around 22:00, and Beale's force picked it up on radar about 80 minutes later. Not long thereafter, the enemy made visual contact on the Allied surface force, let go the barges they were towing to Biak, and launched torpedoes before retiring at high speed.

The Allied lead destroyers, Beale among them, charged toward the retreating enemy at flank speed and began firing at extreme range in the hope of closing the distance by forcing the Japanese to maneuver to avoid their salvos. The enemy destroyers returned the fire and even launched another torpedo attack. The only damage – other than fragments from near misses – sustained by either side in the running duel, however, came about 02:10 on the 9th, when Shiratsuyu suffered a direct hit from one of the salvos from Destroyer Division 47. The enemy destroyer slowed briefly, but picked up speed again soon thereafter. Just before 02:30, the Allied force broke off the stern chase in compliance with orders issued to protect its ships from attack by friendly aircraft. Task Force 75 met with TF 74 later that morning, and then Beale headed for Manus in the Admiralty Islands, where she spent 10 to 28 June carrying out maintenance and combat training.

On 29 June, the destroyer stood out of Seeadler Harbor on her way to participate in the last two major amphibious operations of the New Guinea campaign. Before invading the Vogelkop peninsula proper on its northwestern coast at Cape Sansapor, General MacArthur concluded that his forces needed airfields farther west than those the Allies already possessed, and the island of Noemfoor, though relatively well defended, met his requirements perfectly. Beale and her colleagues in the cruiser-destroyer force arrived off the invasion beaches at Kamiri on Noemfoor's northwestern coast early on the morning of 2 July, and they pummelled the objective with a preliminary bombardment that pounded the defenders into what historian Samuel Eliot Morison described as "...that desirable state known to pugilists as 'punch drunk'." That happy result allowed the assault troops to storm ashore and capture all their initial objectives against a resistance that scarcely deserved the name. It also obviated the immediate need for Beale and her consorts to provide gunfire support for the troops' initial movement inland from the beaches. Accordingly, she headed for Humboldt Bay that same day and arrived there on the 3 July.

After maintenance and overhaul work at Hollandia and Manus, she returned to the northern coast of New Guinea in mid-July to help defend the Allied eastern flank at Hollandia against pressure from the bypassed enemy garrison at Wewak. She patrolled along the coast to interdict Japanese barge and truck traffic carrying reinforcements and supplies to their forces trying to breach the Aitape roadblock and contest Allied possession of the Hollandia region. Training exercises and further patrols along New Guinea's northern coast occupied Beale's time until the end of the month, when she helped cover the unopposed landing at Cape Sansapor on the Vogelkop peninsula, the last step on the New Guinea campaign.

At the beginning of August, she left New Guinea for Australia and spent 11 to 25 August receiving major maintenance work at Sydney. Revitalized, the destroyer returned to the northern shores of New Guinea at the end of the month to resume patrols along the coast still held by isolated enemy forces and to prepare for the Allies' next move on the southwestern Pacific, the jump from New Guinea into the Molucca Islands at Morotai. Beale departed Humboldt Bay on 13 September to meet near the Vogelkop where the warships covering the seizure came together for the approach. Reunited there with many of her colleagues from the long series of operations from the Bismarcks to the Vogelkop, the destroyer set off with them on the latest quest. The force arrived off Cape Gila on the southwestern coast of Morotai early on the morning of D-Day, 15 September, and the cruiser-destroyer force to which Beale belonged parted company with the main group to cross the strait between Morotai and Halmahera to bombard a Japanese strongpoint reported to be located at Galela. After pounding the target for more than an hour without reply, the destroyer accompanied her consorts back across the strait to provide gunfire support for the landing itself. Her guns, however, remained silent because an absent enemy allowed the assault troops to occupy the objective unmolested. Since her gunfire support proved unnecessary, Beale retired from Morotai and met with TG 77.1 near Mios Woendi on the 16th.

For almost a month, she conducted training exercises in the vicinity of the Admiralty Islands, with repair periods in Seeadler Harbor at Manus. By 12 October, the destroyer was back at Humboldt Bay, readying herself for the invasion of the Philippines at Leyte. On the 13th, Beale's close covering group, TG 77.3, left the bay with the Northern LST Group, whose landings on Leyte near Tacloban at the head of San Pedro Bay it was to support. The group escorted the Northern Attack Force into Leyte Gulf during the night of 19–20 October, and together they made their way toward the northwestern corner of the gulf. While the amphibious forces approached their stations and took up their positions, the battleships of the Fire Support Unit, North, subjected the target area to a withering barrage. At the conclusion of that fire, Beale and her compatriots in TG 77.3 moved in to their support roles. Her cruiser-destroyer force opened fire around 09:00, and about 30 minutes later when the assault craft started their runs toward shore, Beale and her mates shifted their attention inland.

The destroyer remained "on call" in San Pedro Bay for four days to provide gunfire support for the troops ashore whenever they requested it. During that time, she fought to repel frequent enemy air raids, which exacted a toll from Beale's cohorts. On the 20th, a torpedo bomber scored a hit on Honolulu that forced her return to the United States for repairs, which occupied her for the remainder of the war. The next day, she fired upon a suicide plane, but failed to prevent it from crashing HMAS Australia. On the 22nd, another kamikaze crossed her sights, but again her efforts succeeded only partially. Though diverted from Beale, the suicide plane struck LCI-105 in nearby waters.

By midday on the 23rd, vague fears of a surface threat to the amphibious units assembled in Leyte Gulf began to take more tangible form, as contact reports from submarines and aircraft confirmed the approach of at least three separate Japanese naval forces. The following afternoon, Vice Admiral Thomas C. Kinkaid organized his warships in the gulf to bar entry to the enemy. Beale's unit headed south to await the forces of Vice Admirals Shoji Nishimura and Kiyohide Shima in Surigao Strait, the passage between Leyte and the Dinagat Islands. Posted on the right flank forward of the battle line, she participated in the second torpedo attack by destroyers on Nishimura's advancing warships just before 03:30 on 25 October. Though her own torpedoes failed to hit the enemy, several of those from her colleagues did. One hit battleship Yamashiro and slowed her briefly, while another delivered the coup de grâce to destroyer Michishio, damaged almost an hour earlier by DesRon 54 in the first destroyer torpedo attack.

Beale and her cohorts then retired to give the cruisers and battleships a clear field of fire. Once the left-flank destroyers executed the third torpedo attack and cleared the area, the battle line and the cruisers completed the attack initiated by the destroyers. Of Nishimura's two battleships, one heavy cruiser, and four destroyers, only the cruiser and a destroyer, both heavily damaged, escaped that encounter. The cruiser Mogami did not last long; the Japanese sank her later in the day after she was further pounded by surface gunfire and aerial attacks.

Vice Admiral Shima's foray into Surigao Strait was a very desultory affair, and Beale and her colleagues, having already yielded the field to the heavy units after launching torpedoes at Nishimura's approach, never came in contact with the enemy's second, halfhearted attempt to force the strait. Upon confirming to his own satisfaction that Nishimura's force was effectively destroyed, Shima displayed surprising prudence for a Japanese commander by retreating with his own vastly inferior force.

The magnitude of the American victory increased as word of the successes in the actions farther north off Samar and off Cape Engaño filtered into the gulf during the few days that Beale remained there, guarding the amphibious force against submarine and air attacks. On 29 October, the destroyer left for the United States. Steaming by way of Ulithi Atoll and Pearl Harbor, she docked at Seattle, Washington, on 27 November. From there, the warship headed south to San Francisco, where she began an extended repair period. She completed those repairs on 17 January 1945 and departed San Francisco the next day, bound for San Diego and two weeks of postoverhaul refresher training. On the last of day January, Beale stood out of San Diego on her way to rejoin the Pacific Fleet for the final stages of the war against Japan.

=== 1945 ===
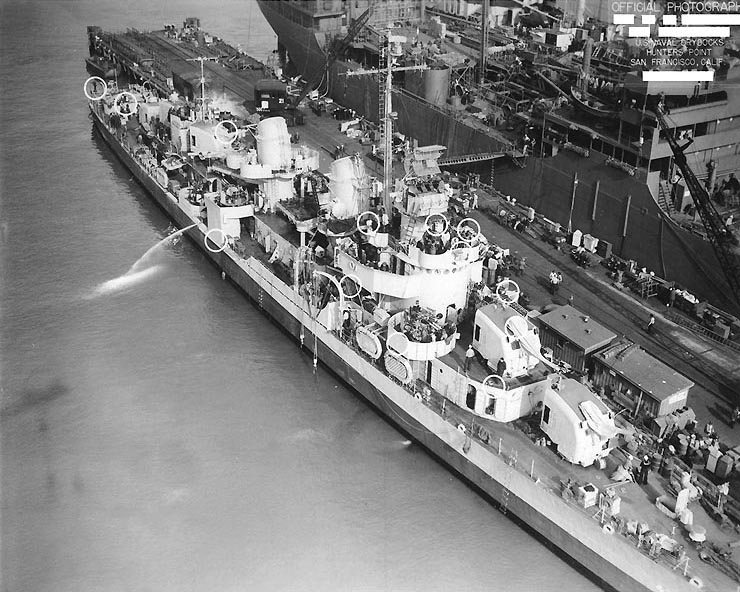
USS Beale (DD-471), plan view forward, taken at the Hunters Point Naval Drydocks, San Francisco, California, 13 January 1945: White outlines mark recent alterations to the ship.

Beale arrived in Hawaii on 8 February, and the following day, she commenced gunnery and ASW training in the local operating area. She remained so engaged for nearly a month, and as a consequence, missed out on the assault on Iwo Jima carried out on 19 February; she did put to sea for the western Pacific, though, in plenty of time for the invasion of Okinawa. The destroyer sailed from Pearl Harbor on 5 March, and after a voyage that took her back via Ulithi Atoll, arrived at Leyte once again on St. Patrick's Day 1945 to be incorporated into the fleet gathering there for the assault on the Ryukyu Islands.

After 10 days of preparations, she stood out of Leyte Gulf on 27 March in the screen of a fast echelon of TF 55, the Southern Attack Force, and set a course for Okinawa. Beale and her companions caught up with the slower echelons of the task force along the way, and together they arrived off the objective early in the morning of 1 April — Easter Sunday, April Fool's Day, and L-Day for Okinawa all in one. Later that morning, the 5th Fleet staged its own version of an Easter parade when the vast amphibious force there assembled landed soldiers of the XXIV Army Corps and Marines of the III Amphibious Corps on the island's western coast at beaches to either side of the mouth of the Bisha River. At that point, the destroyers in the screen received other assignments, and Beale joined TF 54, the gunfire and covering force, to serve as a seaborne artillery battery for the Army and Marine Corps, while they consolidated their beachheads and started their advance inland.

Both the troops ashore and the sailors supporting them in the warships marveled at the enemy's feeble responses to the initial assault. The relative ease of that first thrust, however, only masked the gathering storm, and the calm lasted but a few days. On shore, the soldiers began to run into stiffer opposition as the first week drew to a close, and by the opening of the second week, so had the marines. The land campaign dragged on until early July. At sea, the "Divine Wind" blew on the fleet surrounding Okinawa for the first time on 6 and 7 April. During that first of eight major aerial assaults that the Japanese launched upon the ships at Okinawa, Beale's guns contributed to the antiaircraft barrage with which those ships tried to defend themselves. In spite of that collective effort, some of the intruders succeeded in their missions.

In one such instance on the afternoon of the 6th, her sister ship Newcomb suffered crashes by four kamikaze planes in one hour while on station some 10 miles (18 km) north of Zampa Misaki. Another sister, nearby Leutze, went to Newcomb's aid immediately, while the more distant Beale rushed to offer her help, as well. When the fourth suicide plane to hit Newcomb slid across to Leutze's fantail before exploding, the damage it caused forced her to pull away from Newcomb's side and leave Beale to assist Newcomb alone. As a result of the prompt help Beale and Leutze rendered, Newcomb's crew quelled the fire on board their ship within half an hour, and busy Tekesta towed her into the anchorage at Kerama Retto the following day.

After seeing Newcomb and Tekesta safely into Kerama Retto, Beale resumed duty with TF 54, providing gunfire support for the troops on Okinawa. Though call fire remained one of the warship's primary missions during her 12 weeks of service in the Ryūkyūs, the frequency and intensity of the Japanese aerial counterstrokes diverted her attention incessantly from that assignment to air defense. Antiair warfare also intruded upon her other major role at Okinawa, service in the ubiquitous antisubmarine screen. In providing protection from both submarines and aircraft, Beale divided her time between the gunfire support units and the ships that retired each night to safer waters some distance from the shores of Okinawa.

The desperate, aerial tactics that the Japanese relied upon as their response to the Okinawa invasion, however, made antiair warfare the predominant form of combat carried out by Navy units in the campaign. Beale, therefore, continued contact with enemy aviators throughout her participation in the island's subjugation. On 16 April, while she screened the fire-support ships of TG 51.5 near Ie Shima, three enemy planes attempted attacks on Beale. Her gunfire damaged the first intruder – misidentified as a German Focke-Wulf Fw 190 — when the pilot tried a suicide dive, and he splashed into the sea well clear of the ship. Almost immediately, though, two "Val" dive bombers pushed over into conventional bombing attacks, coming in on Beale's starboard side abeam. Her guns opened up on them at a distance of about 8,000 yards (7,300 m) and continued to fire until a Marine Corps F4U "Corsair" flew into her field of fire in his attempt to intercept the two "Vals." The destroyer ceased fire quickly, but all three planes, the two enemies and one friend, splashed into the ocean at some distance from Beale. Fortunately, the "Corsair" pilot managed to bail out, and a destroyer escort rescued him.

During May, the warship experienced two more close calls with Japan's airborne fanatics. After dark on the 4 May, a single-engind plane, unrecognizable in the darkness, tried to crash Beale, but again her gunners rose to the challenge and sent it into the sea a scant 100 yards (91 m) away on the port beam. On 28 May, another "Val" pilot sought to make Beale his funeral pyre, but he, too, succumbed to her antiaircraft barrage and fell into the sea close aboard.

By the beginning of June, enemy resistance at Okinawa was on the ebb, both in the air and on the ground. Few planes penetrated the cordon of radar pickets stationed around the island with any regularity or frequency, and the land defense found itself bottled up in several relatively isolated pockets. On 3 June, Beale helped to eradicate of one of those pockets when she supported the landings on Iheya Retto, one of Okinawa's satellite island groups located about 11 miles (20 km) north of the Motobu Peninsula. Organized resistance in the Ryūkyūs ended at the start of the last week in June, and the campaign for Okinawa closed officially on 2 July.

In the meantime on 24 June, Beale shaped a course for Leyte in the Philippines, where she conducted some minor repairs and took on supplies. The destroyer returned to Okinawa on 16 July and joined TF 95, the unit with which she spent the next three weeks of carrying out antishipping sweeps along the China coast, in the Yellow Sea, and in the Sea of Japan. She returned to Okinawa on 8 August, and the war ended during the four weeks that she remained there. Japan agreed to capitulate on 15 August, and her representatives signed the surrender document on 2 September. Beale departed Buckner Bay on 6 September and laid in a course for Japan. She arrived in Nagasaki on the 15th and began duty in support of the Allied occupation. During the next two months, she visited several Japanese ports while engaged in courier duty, demilitarization inspections, and escort missions.

On 15 November, the destroyer stood out of Sasebo for the voyage back to the United States. Beale steamed by way of Pearl Harbor and arrived in San Diego on 6 December. Four days later, she returned to sea bound for the East Coast. The warship transited the Panama Canal on the 18th and entered port at Charleston, South Carolina, two days before Christmas 1945. Following a three-month inactivation overhaul, Beale was decommissioned at the Charleston Navy Yard on 11 April 1946. She remained in reserve for almost six years.

== 1951–1962 ==
While still part of the inactive fleet, the warship was moved to the Boston Naval Shipyard for conversion to an escort destroyer. Redesignated as DDE-471, Beale was recommissioned at Boston on 1 November 1951. She remained at Boston, finishing her conversion until the second week of 1952. On 8 January, she embarked on her shakedown cruise, which after a short visit to Norfolk, Virginia, she conducted in the West Indies. After postshakedown availability at Boston between late March and early May, she reported for duty with the Atlantic Fleet at Norfolk on 5 May. Near the end of the month, the destroyer headed for the Gulf of Mexico, where she spent June operating as planeguard for Cabot during training operations out of Pensacola, Florida. She returned to Norfolk on Independence Day 1952 and resumed normal operations from that port. Training duty in the Virginia Capes operating area and upkeep at Norfolk occupied her time for the remainder of 1952. Late in January 1953, Beale moved south on her way to the large annual fleet exercise called Springboard. After preliminary drills with Midway off the Florida coast near Mayport, she continued on to the vicinity of Puerto Rico, where maneuvers were carried out in late February and early March. The warship arrived back in Norfolk on 13 March and stayed there for a little more than a month. On 17 April, she stood out of Chesapeake Bay, bound for exercises in the waters around the British Isles, followed by a short cruise in the Mediterranean. During that deployment, she visited Londonderry in Northern Ireland and Plymouth, England, before transiting the Strait of Gibraltar to call at Golfe Juan, France, and Naples, Italy. The destroyer departed Naples on 13 June, plotted a course back to the United States, and reentered Norfolk on the 26th.

She conducted local operations during July and the first part of August and then sailed north to the coast of Nova Scotia, where she spent the rest of August serving as planeguard for Valley Forge. Beale arrived back at Norfolk on 4 September and continued local operations and upkeep until the beginning of October. On 2 and 3 October, she made the short voyage to New York, where she began a three-month overhaul, her first since rejoining the active fleet. After refresher training off the Cuban coast near Guantanamo Bay early in 1954, the destroyer returned to Norfolk in March to prepare for an assignment overseas. On 11 May, she embarked on a tour of duty in the Mediterranean Sea. Service with the 6th Fleet kept her busy until early that fall, when she headed back to the U.S. Beale reached Norfolk again on 10 October 1954 and spent the rest of the year in port.

In January 1955, she took up East Coast operations once again, ranging from Newport, Rhode Island, in the north to Puerto Rico and Key West in the south. Beale remained so engaged until late May, when she began six weeks of upkeep at Norfolk. At the end of the first week in July, she departed Norfolk and headed back to Newport, where she conducted exercises with carriers briefly before proceeding to the vicinity of Bermuda and carried out operations with recently commissioned Nautilus. After assisting in the evaluation of the capabilities of the first nuclear-powered submarine, Beale stood into Norfolk once more on 6 August. A month later, she returned to sea for an abbreviated deployment overseas to participate in two NATO exercises, Operations Centerboard and New Broom IV, both of which were carried out in the Atlantic off Portugal. Leaving Lisbon on 10 October, the destroyer re-entered Norfolk on the 23rd.

Following an upkeep and repair period that lasted through the end of the year, Beale resumed local operations off the Virginia Capes early in January 1956. In mid-February, the warship headed south to participate in the annual Springboard fleet exercise in the waters between Cuba and Puerto Rico. Back in Norfolk on 22 March, she conducted type training and similar evolutions in the immediate vicinity through the end of May. On the 31st, Beale left Hampton Roads bound for the Gulf of Mexico, where she engaged in further training missions punctuated by visits to Pensacola, New Orleans, and Galveston. The destroyer departed the last port on 5 July and arrived back in Norfolk on the 9th. Regular overhaul at the Norfolk Naval Shipyard occupied her time from the middle of July until early November. On 10 November, Beale put to sea for Guantanamo Bay, Cuba, and a month of postoverhaul refresher training. Back in Norfolk a week before Christmas, she drilled in the local operating area through the first 11 weeks of 1957.

On 18 March, she embarked on a voyage in which she circumnavigated the African continent. Unable to use the Suez Canal, closed as a result of the hostilities between Israel and Egypt that followed in the wake of Nasser's nationalization of the canal the preceding summer, the warship deployed to the Indian Ocean via the long route around southern Africa. Steaming by way of the Azores, Beale reached the African coast at Freetown, Sierra Leone, on 30 March. She visited Simonstown, Union of South Africa, from 10 to 12 April before rounding Cape Agulhas, Africa's southernmost point, on her way to Mombassa, Kenya. After leaving Mombassa, the destroyer sailed to the Persian Gulf, where she called at Qeshm, Iran, and Bahrain. From the Persian Gulf, she headed for the reopened Suez Canal via Massawa, Eritrea (now a province of Ethiopia). Beale transited the canal at the beginning of June and arrived at Piraeus, Greece, on the 4th. Between 5 and 14 June, she crossed the Mediterranean Sea to Spain, where she spent the ensuing four weeks making calls of port at Valencia, Cartagena, and Barcelona. Following a two-day stop at Gibraltar, she crossed the Atlantic on 14 July and stood into Norfolk again on 26 July.

Beale's homecoming lasted less than six weeks, however, for she put to sea again on 3 September bound for the British Isles. She arrived in Plymouth, England, on the 14th and spent the rest of the month engaged in NATO exercise Stand Firm. At the conclusion of the exercise, the destroyer paid a 10-day visit to Cherbourg. On 10 October, she left the French port to return to the U.S. Beale entered Chesapeake Bay once more on 22 October and resumed normal operations along the East Coast.

Near the end of March 1958, Beale received word of the cancellation of her scheduled deployment to the Mediterranean in favor of an assignment with Task Group Alfa, an experimental group formed to develop and teach new and advanced antisubmarine defense techniques and procedures. For more than five years, her work with the ASW developmental group kept her tied fairly closely to the East Coast and precluded any tours of duty farther away from the United States than the West Indies.

== 1962–1968 ==
That extended assignment did not prevent her from participating in internationally significant events, however, for, after Fidel Castro's insurgents succeeded in overthrowing the dictatorship of Fulgencio Batista in Cuba in 1959, ships of the Navy performed almost constant patrols off that troubled island. Beale carried out her first such mission between 13 and 26 April 1961, and her second tour of duty in Cuban waters lasted from the end of June until mid-August 1962. On 30 June 1962, she resumed her former destroyer classification and the designation, DD-471.

Later that year, after reconnaissance flights over the island revealed the presence of offensive nuclear missiles, President John F. Kennedy declared a "quarantine" of Cuba to prevent the importation of additional missiles and to secure the removal of those already in place. Beale served on the Cuban Missile Crisis "blockade" from 25 October to 5 November 1962. During these operations, on Saturday, 27 October, the Beale dropped practice depth charges on Soviet submarine B-59 (Foxtrot) class, after which the submarine surfaced, upon which the Beale closed to within 500 yards on a parallel course, illuminating the Soviet vessel with her 24-inch searchlight. Soviet sources later revealed that the depth-charge attack by the Beale had caused the commander of the Soviet submarine, Savitsky, who was unable to establish radio contact with base, to consider firing a 15-kiloton nuclear torpedo, and had asked two other senior officers to vote, with the dissenting vote of Vasili Arkhipov preventing the launch.

After an additional year of service along the East Coast and in the West Indies, Beale completed preparations in November 1963 to embark upon her first major overseas deployment in more than half a decade. On the 29th, she stood out of Norfolk on her way across the Atlantic Ocean. The warship arrived in Pollença Bay, Mallorca, on 11 December and relieved McCaffrey (DD-860) the following afternoon. During her first eight weeks with the 6th Fleet, normal activities such as exercises and port visits occupied her time. Early in February 1964, however, orders sent her to the eastern Mediterranean, where she joined a contingency force brought together in response to trouble on the island of Cyprus. Service with the contingency force received her undivided attention until the first week in March. Afterwards, Beale made a six-day liberty call at Istanbul, Turkey, and then returned to sea for further duty in the eastern Mediterranean, which included NATO exercises in the Ionian Sea. Late in March, she returned to the western portion of the "middle sea", where she spent the remaining six weeks of her deployment. Completing turnover formalities at Pollensa Bay near the end of the second week in May, Beale transited the Strait of Gibraltar on the 14th and shaped a course for Hampton Roads.

Ten days later, she arrived at Norfolk and commenced postdeployment standdown. The destroyer remained in port for over a month, getting underway again early in July for an Independence Day visit to Baltimore, Maryland. Following the celebration, she took on familiar routine of training missions along the East Coast and in the West Indies. That filled her time for the remainder of 1964, while a regular overhaul at Norfolk occupied her during the first few months of 1965. After refresher training out of Guantanamo Bay in the summer of 1965, Beale resumed normal operations from Norfolk.

After nearly a year of training duty out of her home port, she departed Norfolk on 1 June 1966 bound for the Far East and her first combat assignment in more than two decades. On the outward voyage, she traveled by way of the Panama Canal, Hawaii, and Guam before arriving at the 7th Fleet's base at Subic Bay in the Philippines near the end of the second week in July. Following a tour of duty as station ship at Hong Kong, Beale entered the combat zone in the waters adjacent to Vietnam on 24 July. The next day, she began service as a gunfire support ship on the "gun line" just off the Vietnamese coast. At the end of two weeks as a floating artillery battery, the warship returned to Subic Bay to replenish and perform maintenance. Late in August, Beale resumed duty on the gun line. In September and October, she served in the screen of the carrier, Intrepid. Early in November, the destroyer concluded her final tour in the combat zone and began the voyage home. Steaming via the Indian Ocean, the Suez Canal, the Mediterranean Sea, and the Atlantic Ocean, she completed a circumnavigation of the globe when she pulled into Norfolk on 17 December.

The extended standdown period that Beale began upon her return lasted well into 1967. She did not put to sea again until March, two weeks of which were spent carrying out type training in the Virginia Capes operating area. On 10 April, the warship stood out of Chesapeake Bay for Key West and nearly a month of duty as a school ship for the Fleet Sonar School located there. Back in Norfolk on 8 May, Beale remained relatively inactive until June, when she participated in exercise New Look, a 36-ship ASW training effort that involved units of four NATO navies. In July, a board of inspection and survey looked her over and mandated a restricted availability, which she carried out at Baltimore, Maryland, in August. She resumed normal operations out of Norfolk in September, and those evolutions occupied her until the middle of October, when she started preparations for her final deployment overseas.

On 14 November, the warship passed between Capes Henry and Charles and laid in a course for the Mediterranean Sea. Steaming in company withfour DesRon 32 destroyers that included Beale's sister ship and frequent colleague Bache, she arrived in Pollença Bay, Mallorca, on the 24th. She spent most of her last deployment in the western Mediterranean, sailing east of the Italian "boot" only once, when she entered the Adriatic in late January 1968 to call at Split, Yugoslavia. Her activities in the western basin consisted of a mix of exercises – unilateral, bilateral, and multilateral in composition – and visits to a variety of French and Italian ports, as well as one brief call at Malta. After being relieved by Moale at Málaga, Spain, Beale got underway for Norfolk on Easter Sunday 1968. Of the four DesRon 32 ships that had accompanied her to the Mediterranean the previous fall, though, only three joined her in the return trip. A storm at Rhodes early in February had reduced Bache to an unsalvageable wreck. Beale and her companion ships arrived back in Hampton Roads on 23 April.

Following postdeployment leave and upkeep, Beale commenced her last weeks of operations with the Navy late in May. She steamed north to Newport, Rhode Island, where she served as a training platform for the Destroyer School until the latter part of June. On 25 June, the warship returned to Norfolk and began preparations for another review by a board of inspection and survey. The inspection, carried out at the Norfolk Naval Shipyard early in August, resulted in a recommendation that Beale be retired. She was decommissioned at Norfolk, Virginia, on 30 September 1968, and her name was struck from the Naval Vessel Register on 1 October 1968. The former warship performed her last service to the Navy on 24 June 1969, when she was sunk as a target about 250 mi (460 km) east of the mouth of Chesapeake Bay.

== Awards ==
Beale earned six battle stars for World War II service and one battle star during the Vietnam War.
