= USS Cony =

Fletcher-class destroyer

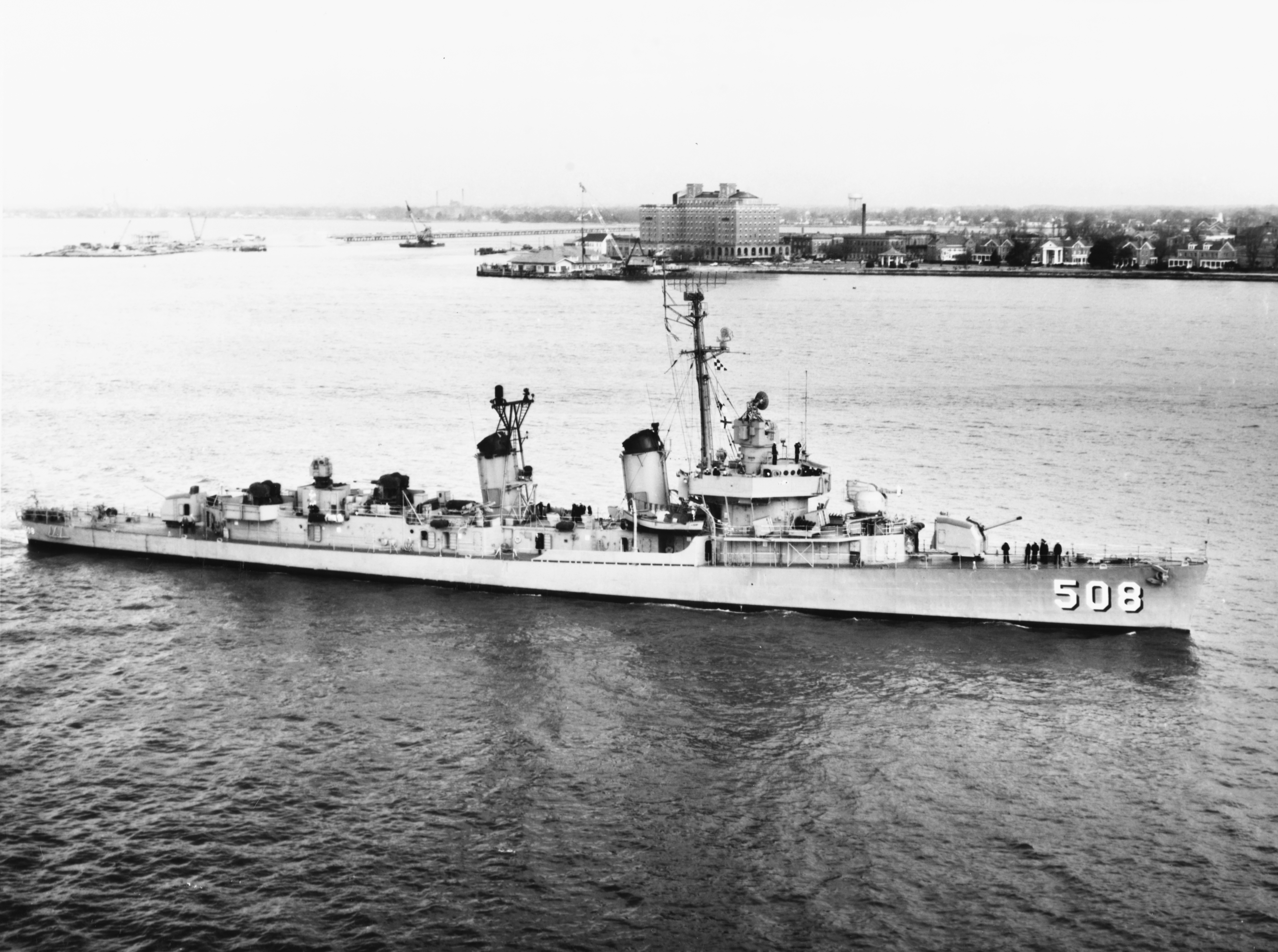
- USS Cony (DDE-508) in Hampton Roads 1957

History

United States
- Namesake: Joseph S. Cony
- Builder: Bath Iron Works
- Laid down: 24 December 1941
- Launched: 16 August 1942
- Commissioned: 30 October 1942
- Decommissioned: 2 July 1969
- Stricken: 2 July 1969
- Fate: Sunk as a target, 20 March 1970

General characteristics
- Class & type: Fletcher-class destroyer
- Displacement: 2,050 tons
- Length: 376 ft 6 in (114.7 m)
- Beam: 39 ft 8 in (12.1 m)
- Draft: 17 ft 9 in (5.4 m)
- Propulsion: 60,000 shp (45 MW); 2 propellers
- Speed: 35 knots (65 km/h; 40 mph)
- Range: 6500 nmi. (12,000 km) at 15 kt
- Complement: 336
- Armament: 5 × single Mk 12 5 in (127 mm)/38 guns; 5 × twin 40 mm (1.6 in) Bofors AA guns; 7 × single 20 mm (0.8 in) Oerlikon AA guns; 2 × quintuple 21 in (533 mm) torpedo tubes; 6 × single depth charge throwers; 2 × depth charge racks

USS Cony (DD/DDE-508), a Fletcher-class destroyer, was a ship of the United States Navy named for Joseph S. Cony (1834–1867), a naval officer during the Civil War.

Cony was launched 16 August 1942 by Bath Iron Works Corp., Bath, Maine, sponsored by Mrs. William R. Sleight, a first cousin of Joseph S. Cony in whose honor the destroyer is named, in part of the largest mass launch to that point in the war shipbuilding program and the largest in Maine's history in which five British Ocean type freighters, the Liberty SS Ethan Allen, USS Conway and Cony were launched. The ship was commissioned 30 October 1942 at Boston.

== 1943 ==
Cony escorted a troop convoy from Norfolk to Nouméa, New Caledonia, where she arrived 27 January 1943. She patrolled between Espiritu Santo and Efate, and on 6 March joined in the bombardment of the Vila-Stanmore area on Kolombangara, continuing her patrol and escort duties until clearing for overhaul at San Francisco 28 April. She returned to action waters at Espiritu Santo 1 August, and after screening a group of transports to Guadalcanal, she brought fire support and was Admiral Theodore S. Wilkinson's flagship for the landings on Vella Lavella on 15 August. She continued patrols and escorted supplies to Vella Lavella until returning to Espiritu Santo 8 September.

From 20 September 1943, Cony patrolled through the Solomons, and from 1 to 3 October joined in a sweep against Japanese barges attempting to evacuate Kolombangara. On 27 October, she sailed to cover the landings on the Treasuries. Here complete surprise was achieved, but Japanese reaction came quickly, and later that day 10 enemy dive bombers, escorted by 39 enemy fighters, attacked Cony and Philip (DD-498). Aided by American fighter aircraft, Cony and her sister splashed 4 dive bombers and 1 fighter, but Cony received two bomb hits on her main deck, and these with a near miss killed 8 of her men, wounded 10, and caused considerable damage. She was towed into Port Purvis on Florida Island for emergency repairs, and sailed on to Mare Island Naval Shipyard for a complete overhaul.

== 1944 ==
Returning to Port Purvis 27 March 1944, Cony patrolled along the southwest coast of Bougainville, hunting Japanese barges and submarines, and giving fire support to troops ashore in the Empress Augusta Bay area. She sailed from Port Purvis 4 May for Majuro and Pearl Harbor, where she joined the screen of a transport group bound for Eniwetok and the Saipan landings on 15 June. Cony screened the transports as they unloaded and carried out antisubmarine patrol until 14 July, when she sailed to replenish at Eniwetok. Six days later she sailed for preinvasion bombardment on Tinian, remaining to patrol in the antisubmarine screen when the landings on Tinian began on 24 July.

Cony returned to Guadalcanal 24 August 1944 to prepare for the assault on the Palau Islands. She screened carriers as they launched air raids supporting the landings on Peleliu between 15 and 30 September, then put into Manus to replenish. The destroyer put to sea once more 12 October, screening and providing fire support for underwater demolition teams and bombardment groups in Leyte Gulf between 19 and 21 October as the landings began. As Japanese forces entered Leyte Gulf on 24 October to begin the Battle of Surigao Strait phase of the epic Battle for Leyte Gulf, Cony took her station with the battleships and cruisers in the battleline, joining in the furious firing of the night action, and pursuing and constantly dueling with Japanese destroyer Asagumo, finally sunk in the morning of 25 October with the aid of fire from another destroyer and two cruisers.

After voyaging to Manus for replenishment, Cony returned to Leyte Gulf for patrol duties 16 November 1944. On the nights of 29–30 November and 1–2 December she joined in sweeps of Ormoc Bay, hunting Japanese shipping. Targets were few, but her group sent a barge to the bottom on their second foray, and bombarded enemy positions on the shores of the bay in preparation for the landings in Ormoc Bay a few days later. Cony put into Kossol Roads from 4 to 10 December, then sailed to screen carriers providing air cover for attack groups passing from Leyte to Mindoro, returning to Kossol Roads 19 December.

== 1945 ==
Cony arrived at Manus 23 December 1944 and sailed 8 days later to screen transports to the Lingayen Gulf landings on 9 January 1945. She cleared the Gulf 11 January to screen empty transports and cargo ships to San Pedro Bay, Leyte, and then took up patrol duty in Lingayen Gulf. The destroyer covered the reconnaissance and sweeping of Baler Bay between 26 February and 10 March by destroyer escort Formoe (DE-509), minesweepers Sentry (AM-299) and Salute (AM-294), and stood by to provide fire support during the landings on Caballo Island in Manila Bay on 27 March. She bombarded Parang between 14 and 19 April, and patrolled in Davao Gulf early in May. On 7 June she sailed from Subic Bay to cover the landings at Brunei Bay, Borneo, on 9 June, and sailed on a fire-support mission aiding minesweeping operations and underwater demolition teams near Balikpapan, Borneo, from 13 June to 2 July.

Returning to San Pedro Bay, Cony sailed on 11 July 1945 to escort transports to landings at Saragani Bay, Mindanao, providing fire support to the forces ashore until 13 July. Through August, she made an escort voyage between Leyte and Ulithi, and on 8 September, arrived in the approaches of the Yangtze River to act as navigational ship during minesweeping operations. Between 29 September and 6 October, she called at Shanghai, then sailed to investigate the compliance with the surrender terms of Japanese troops on Raffles Island in the Chusan Archipelago just off the China coast south of Shanghai. After making a mail run to Okinawa, she served as harbor entrance control ship at Shanghai until 19 November, when she sailed to Taiwan to serve as navigational ship for minesweeping operations in the Taiwan Straits. She sailed for home from Shanghai 20 December, and after calling at San Diego and New York, arrived at Charleston, S.C., 13 March 1946. There she was decommissioned and placed in reserve 18 June 1946.

== 1949 – 1960 ==
Reclassified DDE-508 on 26 March 1949, Cony was converted to an escort destroyer, specially equipped for antisubmarine warfare, and recommissioned 17 November 1949. After training and operations along the east coast and in the Caribbean, she sailed from her home-port, Norfolk, 14 May 1951, on a cruise round the world, during which she operated in the Korean war zone from 18 June to 28 October, returning home by way of the Suez Canal, and arriving at Norfolk 20 December 1951. In September 1953, she again cleared on a distant deployment, taking part in North Atlantic Treaty Organisation (NATO) Operation "Mariner", then exercising with the Royal Navy in antisubmarine operations off Northern Ireland before continuing to a tour of duty with the 6th Fleet in the Mediterranean. In 1955 and 1957, she again served in the Mediterranean, and in September and October 1957, joined in NATO antisubmarine exercises in the English Channel. Local operations and cruises to the Caribbean marked 1958, and in 1959 and 1960. Cony joined Task Force Alfa, an experimental tactical group concentrating on antisubmarine warfare, in its operations along the east coast. With this group, she visited Quebec City, Canada, in June 1960.

== 1961 – 1969 ==
Cony took part in the Bay of Pigs invasion of Cuba in April 1961.

Cony reverted to DD-508 30 June 1962.

In October 1962, she took part in the blockade of Cuba during the Cuban Missile Crisis. On 27 October, Cony intercepted the Soviet submarine B-59, an incident which nearly led to war between the United States and the Soviet Union.

Cony was decommissioned and stricken 2 July 1969. She was sunk as a target off Puerto Rico 20 March 1970.

== Honors ==
Cony received 11 battle stars for World War II service, and two for Korean War service.
