= Joseph S. Cony =

US Navy officer

Joseph Saville Cony (1834 – February 10, 1867) was an officer in the United States Navy who served during the American Civil War. The Fletcher-class destroyer USS Cony was named in his honor.

== Biography ==
Cony was born in 1834 in Eastport, Maine. He was appointed acting ensign November 3, 1862. First attached to USS Western World, he commanded several successful small-boat expeditions along the Carolina coast.

On August 22, 1863, while executive officer of USS Shokokon, he commanded a boat expedition of six men which surprised a much larger enemy encampment at New Topsail Inlet, near Wilmington, North Carolina. This small force captured ten men, one 12-pounder howitzer, eighteen horses, and destroyed the blockade running schooner Alexander Cooper and extensive salt works. For this accomplishment Joseph S. Cony was promoted to Acting Master on September 7, 1863.

In April 1864, while attached to USS Britannia, he received the thanks of Major General Peck for his cooperation with the landing expedition at Bogue Inlet. During his cruise in this vessel he participated in the first attack on Fort Fisher. At the time of the second attack he was attached to USS Fort Jackson and was one of the volunteers in the Navy assault party which assisted in carrying the fort.

Cony was honorably discharged November 7, 1865. In 1866, Mr. Cony was appointed Lieutenant in the regular navy. By that time he was master of the merchant vessel, City of Bath, at sea. Before he could accept this appointment, he went down with his ship off Cape Hatteras on February 10, 1867.
