= Operation Anadyr =

1962 Soviet Cold War secret operation

Date	1962
Location	Cuba
Result	Cuban Missile Crisis

Belligerents
- Soviet Union

Commanders and leaders
- Issa Pliyev; Giorgi Abashvili

Strength
- 47,000 troops; three R-12 missile regiments; two R-14 missile regiments

Operation Anadyr (Russian: Анадырь) was the code name used by the Soviet Union for its Cold War secret operation in 1962 of deploying ballistic missiles, medium-range bombers, and a division of mechanized infantry to Cuba to create an army group that would be able to prevent an invasion of the island by United States forces. The plan was to deploy approximately 60,000 personnel in support of the main missile force, which consisted of three R-12 missile regiments and two R-14 missile regiments. However, part of it was foiled when the United States discovered the plan, prompting the Cuban Missile Crisis.

== Motivations ==
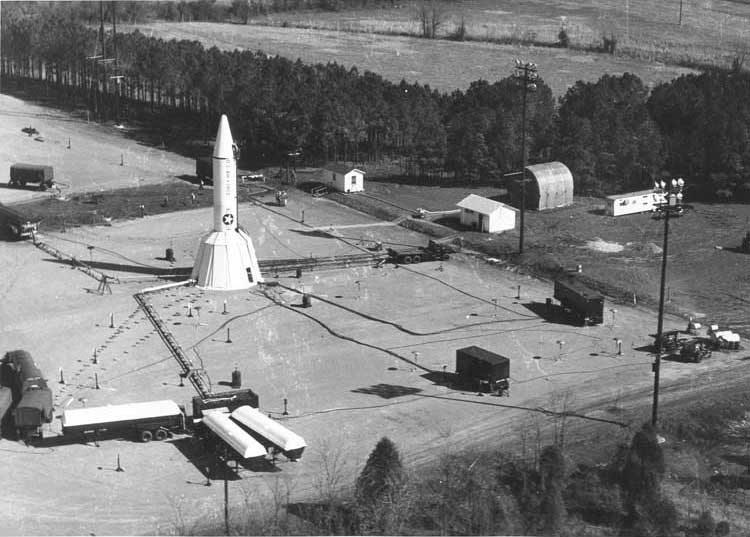
A Jupiter missile surface emplacement similar to the ones in Turkey

According to the memoirs of Nikita Khrushchev, the Soviet leader at the time, he and his defense minister, Rodion Malinovsky, were walking on a Black Sea beach in April 1962 and discussing the threat posed by the short flight time of US Jupiter missiles deployed in Turkey, which needed about 10 minutes to land in the Soviet Union. The disparity in number of warheads between the Soviet Union and the West was also being discussed when deploying missiles to Cuba took root in Khrushchev's mind as a way to compensate for these disadvantages. As Khrushchev put it, he saw the deployment of Soviet missiles in Cuba as "putting one of our hedgehogs down the Americans' trousers".

== Initial plan ==
The initial deployment plan for Operation Anadyr was drafted by General Anatoly Gribkov and two of his assistants sometime after a meeting of the Soviet Defense Council on May 21, 1962, at which Khrushchev's basic idea was discussed and approved. Gribkov's plan included a main missile force of five regiments (including an R-12 regiment from 50th Rocket Army). Three would be armed with R-12 medium-range missiles and two armed with R-14 intermediate-range missiles; each regiment would also be equipped with eight launchers and 1.5 missiles per launcher. In support of this main force, the plan called for:

- two regiments of FKR-1 cruise missiles equipped with 16 launchers and 80 tactical nuclear warheads
- two antiaircraft divisions
- a fighter regiment equipped with MiG-21s
- four motorized rifle regiments, each with its own tank battalion
- a brigade of 12 missile boats

The total personnel figure for the operation was 50,874. The forces required an estimated 85 transports to deploy: mostly freighters, but also some passenger liners. Malinovsky approved this deployment plan on July 4, and Khrushchev gave his final approval three days later.

The fighter regiment (40 MiG-21 aircraft) deployed was the 32nd Guards Fighter Aviation Regiment, from the Kubinka air base. It was renamed the 213th Fighter Aviation Regiment during the deployment.

On September 4, some of the surface-to-air antiaircraft missiles and missile boats (which deployed ahead of the main missile force) were spotted by US reconnaissance flights, and President John F. Kennedy issued a warning. In response, Khrushchev approved reinforcements:

- six Il-28 bombers with a total of six 407H nuclear bombs at their disposal
- three Luna battalions equipped with a total of twelve type 3N14 nuclear warheads

Since the main missile force had not yet been dispatched, these reinforcements would be shipped along with it.

== Transport and deployment ==
Troops were transferred by 86 blockade runners, which conducted 180 voyages from ports at Baltiysk, Liepāja, Sevastopol, Feodosiya, Nikolayev, Poti, Murmansk, and Kronstadt.

Oleg Penkovsky, a double agent in the Soviets' GRU intelligence service primarily working for Britain's MI6, provided details of the missile placements to the United States. A former GRU colonel who defected, Viktor Suvorov, wrote, "Historians will remember with gratitude the name of the GRU Colonel Oleg Penkovsky. Thanks to his priceless information, the Cuban crisis was not transformed into a last World War."

A Lockheed KH-5 Argon reconnaissance satellite was launched on October 9 from Vandenberg Air Force Base. On October 14, photographs were taken by a Lockheed U-2. On October 16, President Kennedy and the United States military command were informed of the presence of Soviet missiles in Cuba, and the Cuban Missile Crisis started.

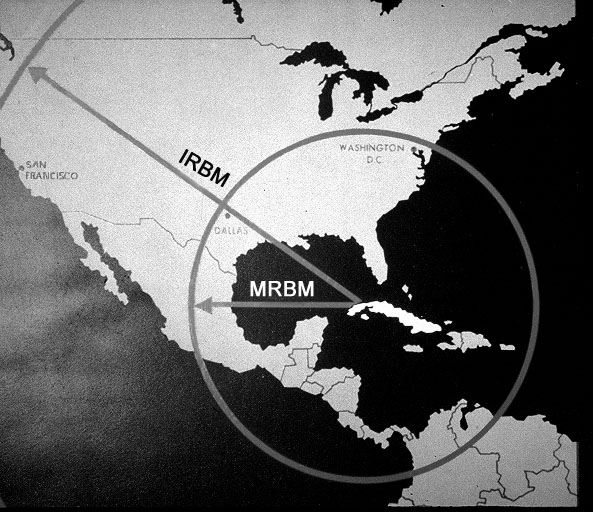
Range of Soviet medium- (MRBM) and intermediate-range (IRBM) ballistic missiles deployed to Cuba

== Soviet denial and deception ==
Operation Anadyr was not only a missile and troop deployment, but also a complex denial and deception campaign. The Soviet attempt to position nuclear weapons in Cuba occurred under a shroud of great secrecy, both to deny the United States information on the deployment of the missiles and to deceive the United States' political leadership, military, and intelligence services on the Soviets' intentions in Cuba. The parameters of Anadyr demanded that both medium- and intermediate-range ballistic missiles be deployed to Cuba and operable before their existence was discovered by the United States, and the Soviet General Staff and political leadership turned to radical measures to achieve this.

=== Military deception ===
Perhaps the most fundamental deception in Operation Anadyr was the code name itself. To an American intelligence analyst poring over intercepted Soviet military communications, "Anadyr" would suggest anything but a movement of Soviet troops to the Caribbean. The Anadyr is a river that flows into the Bering Sea, and also the name of a Soviet district capital and a remote bomber base, both in the far east of the Soviet Union. Thus, both American analysts and rank-and-file Soviet soldiers, prone to starting rumors and leaking information, would most likely have expected the operation to be a military exercise in the northern vastness of the USSR.

In the early planning stages of Operation Anadyr, only five senior officers on the General Staff were privy to the details of the deployment or its actual location. They alone prepared every feature of the enterprise, enough work to keep scores of staff busy for weeks, but so stringent was the demand for secrecy that no one else was allowed into this small coterie. The plans were handwritten to deny knowledge of the operation to even a single secretary.

The logistical preparations for Anadyr were equally covert. Men and matériel were moved by railway to four northern ports and four on the Black Sea. Foreigners were barred from the ports during this period, and most loading occurred under the cover of darkness. Troops awaiting the voyage were restricted to barracks, denied contact with the outside world, and given misdirection by being told that they were headed for a cold region and by being outfitted with ski boots, fleece-lined parkas, and other winter equipment. The same restrictions were placed on the sailors of the transport ships. During the wait, Soviet soldiers kept busy by constructing false superstructures with plywood to hide the ships' defenses, and even on-deck field kitchens. Metal sheets were placed over missiles and missile launchers, which were too large to be stored below decks on most vessels, to prevent detection by infrared surveillance. Other military equipment was stored below decks. Agricultural equipment and other non-military machinery was placed on deck to add to the subterfuge. Once underway, the Soviet troops were not allowed on deck, except at night, and even then only in small groups.

Instructions to the troops and ship crews were carried by special couriers to prevent Western intelligence services from intercepting electronic communications regarding the operation. The ships' captains received their instructions, which revealed their final destination, only after they had put out to sea. The instructions were given to them by a KGB officer aboard who had been entrusted with the envelope prior to departure. Every vessel carried thick folders of information on various countries for the officers aboard to review. Only after the destination was revealed were they specifically instructed to study Cuba.

Soviet denial and deception measures were equally rigid upon the ships' arrival in Cuba. The vessels unloaded at eleven ports to complicate adversarial surveillance. While non-military equipment was unloaded in daylight, matériel with obvious military qualities was unloaded and transported to its end destination only at night. The same applied to major troop movements, and Soviet military positions were generally in sparsely populated areas of the island. The Soviet troops were even forbidden to wear their uniforms, in order to make the Soviet military presence deniable. Instead, they wore civilian attire. Simultaneously, as a false explanation for the presence of the men and equipment, the Soviet media trumpeted the massive agricultural assistance that the Soviets were ostensibly providing to their Cuban comrades.

=== Diplomatic deception ===
The Soviets employed an equally extensive array of diplomatic ruses to disguise their activities in Cuba. Khrushchev embarked on a tour of the Soviet republics in Central Asia for much of the duration of Anadyr. During this time, he explicitly avoided all hostile references to the United States.

The Soviet ambassador to the United States, Anatoly Dobrynin, was a primary instrument in transmitting diplomatic assurances that only defensive weaponry was being supplied to Cuba. On September 4, 1962, for instance, Dobrynin personally asked Attorney General Robert F. Kennedy to inform President Kennedy that no ballistic missiles or other offensive armaments had been transported to Cuba. Dobrynin was repeating a message from Khrushchev himself. Later, he would again deny the presence of Soviet missiles in Cuba.

A KGB officer posted at the Soviet embassy, Georgi Bolshakov, was another source of disinformation. Bolshakov met regularly with Robert Kennedy, who believed him to be an honest diplomat and a discreet communications channel to Khrushchev. Robert Kennedy seemed to personally trust Bolshakov, and President Kennedy came to rely on his information. Throughout the duration of Operation Anadyr, Bolshakov assured the Kennedy brothers that Moscow had no aspirations of turning Cuba into a forward strike base. Bolshakov lost their trust only when the president was shown photographs, taken by a Lockheed U-2 surveillance aircraft, of Soviet ballistic missiles on Cuban soil.

The Soviet media also disseminated misinformation to the public and the world's political leaders. On September 11, the Telegraph Agency of the Soviet Union claimed that the USSR was supplying exclusively defensive weaponry to Cuba to deter American aggression, and that it had no need to place offensive weapons outside of its own soil. Pravda, the official newspaper of the Soviet Communist Party, even censored elements of a speech made by Cuba's leader, Fidel Castro, that hinted at the Soviets' ability to strike the United States from Cuba.

Kennedy was not the only president whom the Soviets attempted to deceive. They also fed false information to the Communist Party of Cuba, overstating the American threat to Cuba, to persuade Cuban leaders to allow Soviet nuclear weapons to be deployed to the island.

Some non-Soviets, however, were privy to accurate information regarding both the American threat and Soviet intentions. The KGB waged a deception campaign in support of Anadyr that involved feeding partially or even wholly correct information to the Cuban émigré community in Miami, Florida. The Soviets knew that information from Cuban exile organizations was perceived by the American intelligence services as highly unreliable. They assumed, correctly, that the Americans would discount warnings from the community as lies that the Cuban émigrés hoped would prompt an American invasion of Cuba and an overthrow of the Castro regime. This assessment was bitterly remembered by the Cuban exile community in the United States. Cuban expatriates, particularly the Truth About Cuba Committee, later condemned the Kennedy administration for its failure to perceive Soviet activities in Cuba despite accurate reports.

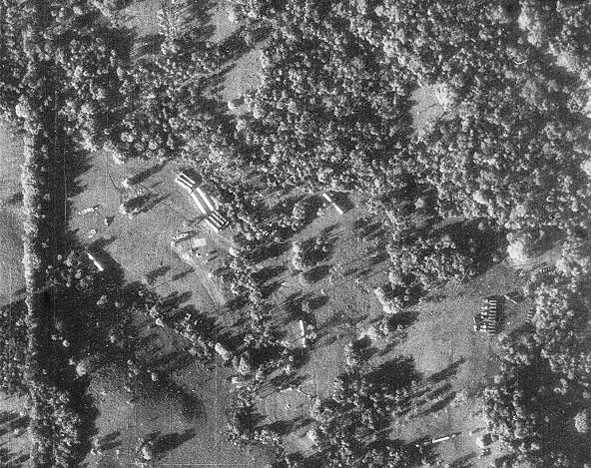
U-2 image of Soviet nuclear missiles in Cuba

The Soviet denial and deception campaign was highly effective, but the eventual discovery of the missile emplacements, which occurred after they were operational, was almost inevitable. American imagery analysis of the Soviet vessels sailing for Cuba had proven fruitless; no indication that the ships carried anything other than non-military equipment was visible. Some American analysts speculated that some of the larger ships might be carrying nuclear-capable ballistic missiles in their holds, but no definitive evidence existed until those missiles were already on Cuban soil. Finally, on October 14, an American U-2 reconnaissance aircraft photographed Soviet ballistic missiles in Cuba. President Kennedy received the images two days later. On October 23, six Vought F-8 Crusader reconnaissance aircraft gathered clearer images from a lower altitude that provided definitive proof of the deployment of Soviet nuclear weapons. The following morning, President Kennedy authorized the blockade that began the actual crisis.

== Operation Kama ==
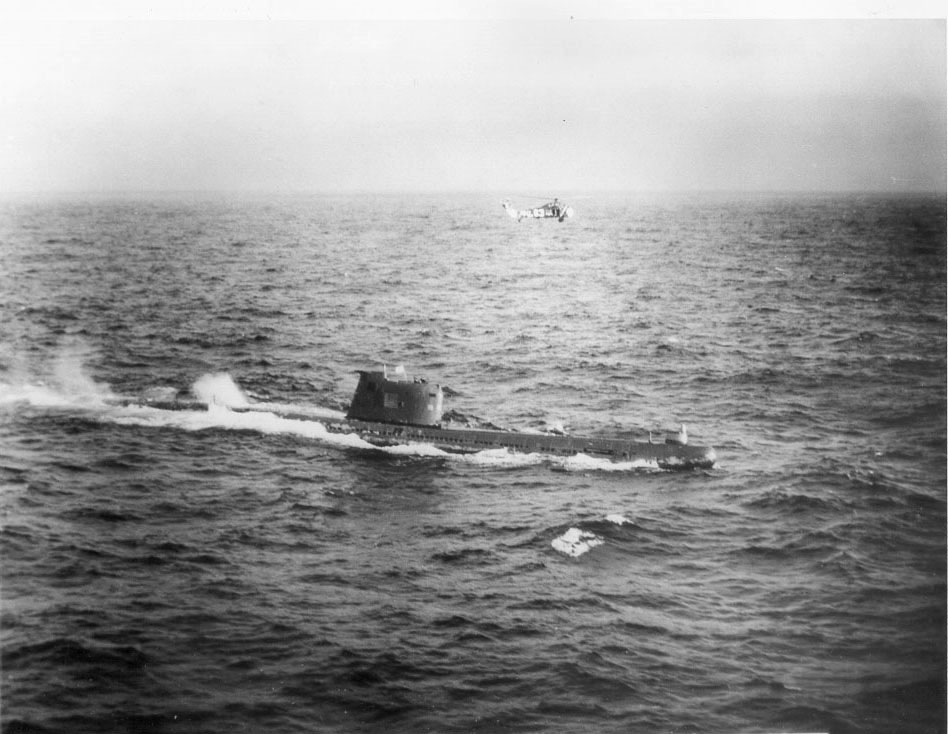
The Soviet B-59 submarine after being forced to the surface, with a United States Navy helicopter circling overhead. 28–29 October 1962.

One part of Operation Anadyr was Operation Kama, a plan to station seven Soviet ballistic missile submarines in Mariel, Cuba. The operation began on October 1, 1962, with the departure of four diesel-electric attack submarines to the Caribbean Sea to clear the way. All four submarines were Project 641 boats, known to NATO as the Foxtrot class. The boats were the B-4 (known as Chelyabinski Komsomolets), the B-36, the B-59, and the B-130.

Kama failed independently of Anadyr, with none of the initially deployed attack submarines reaching Cuba. All four of the attack submarines were detected by the blockade of Cuba in the Sargasso Sea and followed closely by American destroyers and ASW aircraft. (Some of the destroyer crews harassed the Soviet submarines by dropping hand grenades overboard, making it clear that depth charges could follow at any time. One submarine had its rudder damaged and had to be towed back to the USSR.) The after-action report prepared by the Soviet Union's Northern Fleet Headquarters attributed the detection and pursuit of B-36 to the destroyer Charles P. Cecil, and the detection and pursuit of B-59 to a multitude of destroyers and carrier-launched planes. Three of the four submarines were forced to the surface by U.S. Navy ships. B-4 was detected by anti-submarine aircraft, but, unlike the other submarines, it had freshly recharged accumulator batteries. Because of this, it was able to remain submerged until it had evaded the pursuing destroyers.

All of the Soviet submarines experienced a wide range of equipment failures, with faulty cooling systems and damage to the ships themselves. Anatoly Petrovich Andreyev's diary entries describe constant dehydration and sweating in temperatures ranging from 37 °C to 57 °C, and infected rashes—due to lack of water for hygiene—were reported in 100% of personnel. The onboard freezers were overwhelmed, compromising much of the submarines' food supply. Some of them partially surfaced in an attempt to alleviate these problems, which increased the likelihood of detection. Operation Kama ended ignominiously, with three submarines forced to surface within visual range of American ships and the fourth unable to do anything beyond avoid capture.
