= USS LST-466 =

WWII-era American tank landing ship

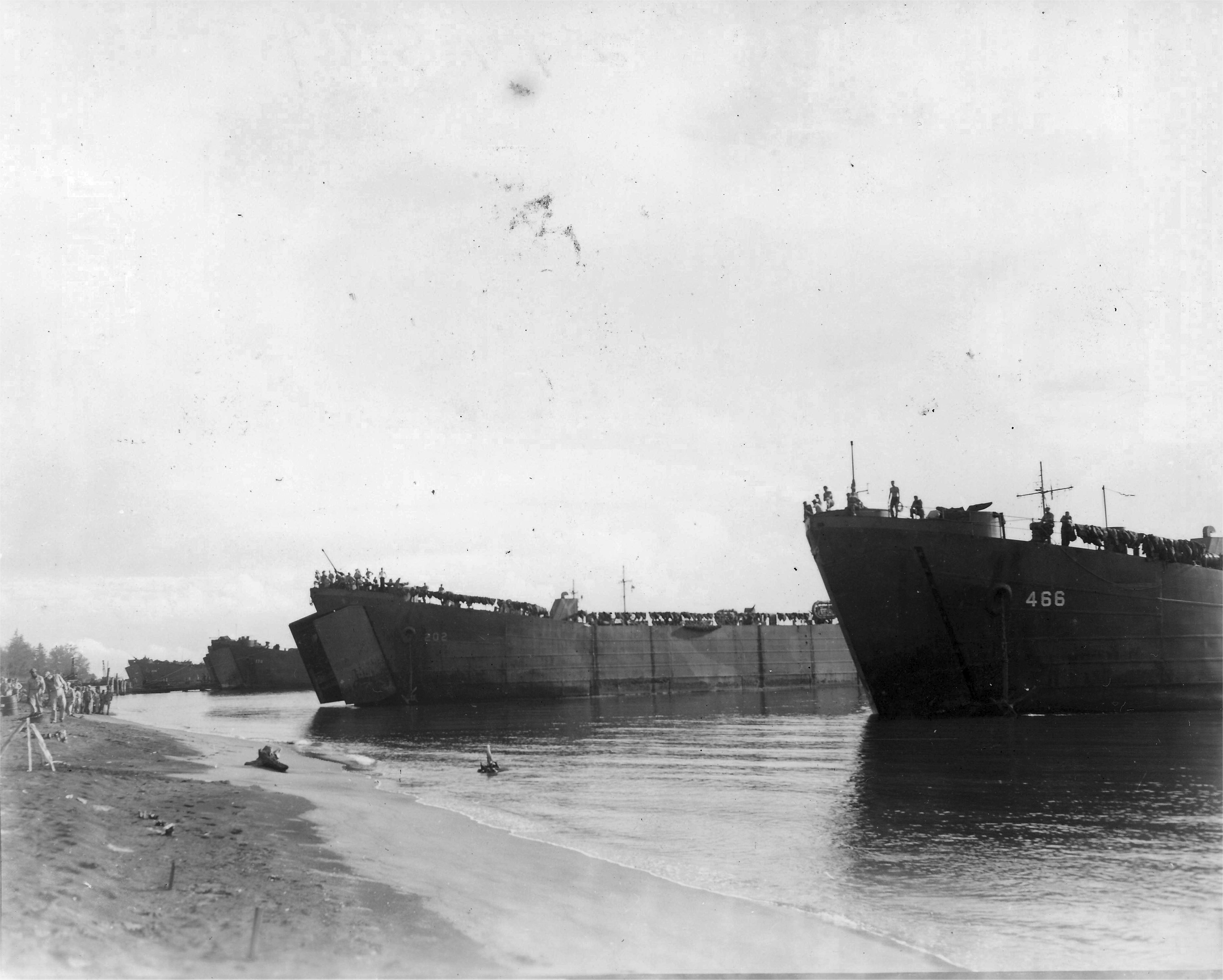
- LSTs, including USS LST-466 and USS LST-202, lined up on the beach at Cape Sudest, New Guinea, awaiting loading for the Admiralty Islands action, 12 March 1944.

History

United States
- Name: LST-466
- Ordered: as a Type S3-M-K2 hull, MCE hull 986
- Builder: Kaiser Shipbuilding Company, Vancouver, Washington
- Yard number: 170
- Laid down: 14 October 1942
- Launched: 18 November 1942
- Commissioned: 1 March 1943
- Decommissioned: 8 March 1946
- Stricken: 12 April 1946
- Identification: Hull symbol: LST-466; Code letters: NFRV
- Honors and awards: 7 × battle stars
- Fate: Sold for scrapping, 4 June 1948

General characteristics
- Class & type: LST-1-class tank landing ship
- Displacement: 4,080 long tons (4,145 t) full load; 2,160 long tons (2,190 t) landing
- Length: 328 ft (100 m) oa
- Beam: 50 ft (15 m)
- Draft: Full load: 8 ft 2 in (2.49 m) forward; 14 ft 1 in (4.29 m) aft; Landing at 2,160 t: 3 ft 11 in (1.19 m) forward; 9 ft 10 in (3.00 m) aft
- Installed power: 2 × 900 hp (670 kW) Electro-Motive Diesel 12-567A diesel engines; 1,700 shp (1,300 kW)
- Propulsion: 1 × Falk main reduction gears; 2 × Propellers
- Speed: 12 kn (22 km/h; 14 mph)
- Range: 24,000 nmi (44,000 km; 28,000 mi) at 9 kn (17 km/h; 10 mph) while displacing 3,960 long tons (4,024 t)
- Boats & landing craft carried: 2 or 6 x LCVPs
- Capacity: 2,100 tons oceangoing maximum; 350 tons main deckload
- Troops: 16 officers, 147 enlisted men
- Complement: 13 officers, 104 enlisted men
- Armament: Varied, ultimate armament; 2 × twin 40 mm (1.57 in) Bofors guns; 4 × single 40 mm Bofors guns; 12 × 20 mm (0.79 in) Oerlikon cannons

Service record
- Part of: LST Flotilla 7
- Operations: Eastern New Guinea operations; Lae occupation (4–10 September 1943); Saidor occupation (2–3 and 7–9 January 1944); Bismarck Archipelago operations; Cape Gloucester, New Britain (26–30 December 1943, 9–11, 15–19, 21–25 February 1944); Admiralty Islands landings (29 February–4 March, 7–11 March 1944); Hollandia operation (21–25 April, 27 April–2 May, 9–14 May 1944); Western New Guinea operations; Toem-Wakde-Sarmi area operation (17–18 and 21–23 May 1944); Biak Islands operation (27–29 May, 31 May–4 June, 12–16, 16–29 June 1944); Noemfoor Island operation (2–4 July 1944); Cape Sansapor operation (2–4, 30 July, and 2–10 August 1944); Leyte landings (13–28 October, 10–29 November 1944); Lingayen Gulf landings (4–15 January 1945); Borneo operations; Tarakan Island operation (27 April–5 May 1945); Balikpapan operation (26 June–4 July 1945)
- Awards: China Service Medal; American Campaign Medal; Asiatic–Pacific Campaign Medal; World War II Victory Medal; Navy Occupation Service Medal w/Asia Clasp; Philippine Republic Presidential Unit Citation; Philippine Liberation Medal

USS LST-466 was a United States Navy LST-1-class tank landing ship used in the Asiatic-Pacific Theater during World War II. As with many of her class, the ship was never named. Instead, she was referred to by her hull designation.

== Construction ==
The ship was laid down on 17 December 1942, under Maritime Commission (MARCOM) contract, MC hull 986, by Kaiser Shipyards, Vancouver, Washington; launched 18 November 1942; and commissioned on 1 March 1943.

== Service history ==
During World War II, LST-466 was assigned to the Asiatic-Pacific theater. She took part in the Eastern New Guinea operation, the Lae occupation in September 1943, the Saidor occupation in January 1944; the Bismarck Archipelago operation, the Cape Gloucester, New Britain, landings from December 1943 through February 1944, and the Admiralty Islands landings in February and March 1944; Hollandia operation in April and May 1944; the Western New Guinea operations, the Toem-Wakde-Sarmi area operation in May 1944, the Biak Islands operation in May and June 1944, the Noemfoor Island operation in July 1944, and the Cape Sansapor operation in July and August 1944; the Leyte operation in October 1944; the Lingayen Gulf landings in January 1945; and the Borneo operations, the Tarakan Island operation in April and May 1945, and the Balikpapan operation in June and July 1945.

Following the war, LST-466 performed occupation duty in the Far East in October 1945, and saw service in China in November and December 1945. Upon her return to the United States, the tank landing ship was decommissioned on 8 March 1946, and struck from the Navy list on 12 April, that same year. On 4 June 1948, she was sold to Hughes Bros., Inc., of New York City, and subsequently scrapped.

== Honors and awards ==
LST-466 earned seven battle stars for her World War II service.

== Notes ==
Citations

== Bibliography ==
Online resources

- "LST-466". Dictionary of American Naval Fighting Ships. Naval History and Heritage Command. This article incorporates text from this source, which is in the public domain.
- "Kaiser Vancouver, Vancouver WA". www.ShipbuildingHistory.com. 27 November 2010.
- "USS LST-466". NavSource. 28 November 2014.
