= AUM-N-6 Puffin =

- Puffin on a JD-1 Invader launch aircraft
- Type: anti-ship missile
- Place of origin: United States

Service history
- In service: 1948–1949
- Used by: United States Navy

Production history
- Designer: National Bureau of Standards
- Designed: 1947–1948
- Manufacturer: McDonnell Aircraft

Specifications
- Mass: 1,300 lb (590 kg)
- Warhead: torpedo or plunge bomb
- Warhead weight: 500 lb (230 kg)
- Engine: McDonnell pulsejet
- Operational range: 20 mi (32 km)
- Maximum speed: Mach 0.7
- Guidance system: Active radar homing

The AUM-N-6 Puffin, also known as Kingfisher F and AUM-6, was an anti-ship and anti-submarine missile developed for use by the United States Navy in the late 1940s. Pulsejet-powered and intended to allow an aircraft to launch a torpedo or bomb from stand-off range, it was flight-tested but failed to enter operational service.

== Design and development ==
In 1944 the U.S. Navy and the National Bureau of Standards initiated Project Kingfisher, intended to develop a family of missiles for attacking enemy ships and surfaced submarines with torpedoes or other weapons intended to strike below the waterline, while allowing the launching aircraft or ship to avoid exposing themselves to enemy defensive fire. Four missiles reached the development stage as a result of the program: the surface-launched Kingfisher E, and the air-launched Kingfisher C, D, and F.

Work on Kingfisher F began on 5 February 1947. Weighing 1,300 pounds (590 kg), the missile was of conventional small-aircraft design with a high-mounted wing and V-tail, a pulsejet engine being mounted in the rear of a streamlined fuselage. Guidance was by active radar homing; after release from the launching aircraft, the missile – redesignated AUM-6 in September 1947, and AUM-N-6 Puffin in 1948 – would cruise at an altitude of 200 feet (61 m), traveling up to 20 miles (32 km) at Mach 0.7. The onboard radar in the missile's nose selecting a target and steering the missile into position to release its payload, carried in the mid-fuselage; while some sources state that a torpedo was intended to be carried, the specification for Kingfisher F called for the missile to carry a 500-pound (230 kg) plunge bomb, intended to be dropped alongside the target ship and detonate underwater, holing the target vessel below the waterline and causing flooding.

The AD Skyraider, PB4Y Privateer, and P5M Marlin were among the aircraft intended to carry Puffin; the missile's constructor, McDonnell Aircraft, proposed that Puffin be qualified for carriage by B-47 Stratojet and B-50 Superfortress bombers of the United States Air Force as well.

== Operational history ==
Construction of Puffin was contracted to McDonnell Aircraft; flight tests of XAUM-N-6 missiles began in 1948. Tests did not demonstrate that the weapon was suitable for service, and on 1 October 1949 the AUM-N-6 program was cancelled.
