= Mark 21 torpedo =

The designation Mark 21 torpedo was applied by the United States Navy to two designs of acoustic homing aerial torpedo, both developed from the widely-used Mark 13 torpedo, but controlled by two different developers and taking two different approaches:

- The Mark 21 Mod 0 torpedo was a torpedo developed in 1943 by Westinghouse, using electric propulsion
- The Mark 21 Mod 2 torpedo was a torpedo developed in the late 1940s by Bell for use in the AUM-N-2 Petrel missile, using steam propulsion
