= SUM-N-2 Grebe =

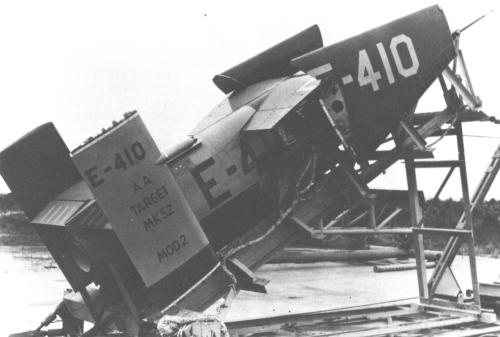
- XSUM-N-2 test missile on launcher with folded wings
- Type: Anti-ship missile
- Place of origin: United States

Service history
- In service: 1950
- Used by: United States Navy

Production history
- Designer: National Bureau of Standards
- Designed: 1947–1950
- Manufacturer: Goodyear Aircraft Company
- No. built: 20

Specifications
- Mass: Rocket powered, 2,500 lb (1,100 kg); Pulsejet powered, 3,000 pounds (1,400 kg)
- Length: 16 ft 5 in (5.00 m)
- Diameter: 21 in (530 mm)
- Wingspan: 14 feet (4.3 m)
- Warhead: Mark 41 torpedo
- Engine: Solid-propellant rocket booster McDonnell pulsejet sustainer optional
- Operational range: Rocket powered, 5,000 yd (2.8 mi; 4.6 km); Pulsejet powered, 40,000 yd (23 mi; 37 km)
- Maximum speed: Mach 0.5

The SUM-N-2 Grebe, also known as Kingfisher E and SUM-2, was a rocket- and pulsejet-powered anti-ship and anti-submarine missile developed by the United States Navy in the late 1940s. Intended to allow a ship to deliver a torpedo at a significant distance from the launch location, it proved impractical in trials, and did not enter operational service.

== Design and development ==
Grebe was developed as part of Project Kingfisher, a program administered by the National Bureau of Standards for the development of a family of torpedo-carrying missiles, allowing underwater-striking weapons to be delivered at stand-off distance from their launching platform. The program developed three air-launched weapons, initially designated Kingfisher C, D, and F; the sole surface-launched member of the family to reach the development stage was Kingfisher E, with development work beginning in 1946.

Kingfisher E, redesignated SUM-2 in September 1947 and SUM-N-2 Grebe in 1948, was a bulky yet conventionally-configured missile resembling a small unmanned aircraft, with a high-mounted, straight wing of 14 feet (4.3 m) span and a twin tail empennage configuration. Constructed by the Goodyear Aircraft Company under subcontract to the Bureau of Standards, the missile was 16 feet 5 inches (5.00 m) in length, 21 inches (530 mm) in diameter and weighed 2,500 pounds (1,100 kg) at launch. Power was provided initially by a solid-propellant rocket, giving a range of 5,000 yards (2.8 mi; 4.6 km) at Mach 0.5; later in the design process a variant with a pulsejet sustainer engine was designed, weighing 3,000 pounds (1,400 kg) and boosting the missile's range to 40,000 yards (23 mi; 37 km) at a cruising speed of Mach 0.26.

The original specification for the missile called for the Mark 35 torpedo to serve as the SUM-N-2's payload; later, to reduce weight, the design was changed to use the Mark 41 torpedo. Several forms of guidance were evaluated, although none had been definitively selected by the end of the program; the torpedo utilized acoustic homing for terminal guidance.

== Operational history ==
Given the cover designation of "AA Target Mk 52 Mod 2", testing of the XSUM-N-2 prototype missiles began in early 1950. Twenty airframes were constructed for use in the testing program; by 1953, however, the program had been cancelled; the stated reason for the cancellation was that the missile outranged the sonar equipment that was required to find targets for it, thus making it infeasible to use at its maximum range. Although the concept of a torpedo-carrying pilotless aircraft failed to find favor with the U.S. Navy, the later French Malafon and Australian Ikara missiles are remarkably similar in concept and configuration; the U.S. Navy would later develop the RUR-5 ASROC, a rocket-delivered torpedo (or a pure missile in the nuclear version), for attacking submarines at range.

In 1972, one Grebe was refurbished for evaluation as part of studies into cruise missile development.

== Surviving examples ==
A Grebe, in "Type IV" configuration, is on display at the United States Naval Undersea Museum in Keyport, Washington.
