= Mark 21 Mod 2 torpedo =

- Type: Anti-surface ship torpedo
- Place of origin: United States

Service history
- In service: never in service

Production history
- Designer: Bell Telephone Laboratories; Underwater Sound Laboratory, Harvard University; Ordnance Research Laboratory, Pennsylvania State University
- Designed: 1943
- Manufacturer: Naval Ordnance Station Forest Park
- Produced: 1946-1955
- No. built: 312

Specifications
- Mass: 2,130 pounds (970 kg)
- Length: 161 inches (4.1 m)
- Diameter: 22.5 inches (57 cm)
- Effective firing range: 6,000 yards (5.5 km)
- Warhead: Mk 21, HBX-3
- Warhead weight: 350 pounds (160 kg)
- Detonation mechanism: Mark 8 contact exploder
- Engine: Steam turbine
- Maximum speed: 33.5 knots (62.0 km/h)
- Guidance system: Gyroscope
- Launch platform: Aircraft

The Mark 21 Mod 2 torpedo, was a passive acoustic homing variant of the Mark 13 torpedo. It used the widely used Mark 13 torpedo as a basis, with the addition of passive acoustic homing developed by Bell Labs.

Propulsion was switched to a steam turbine, to maintain speed performance, although the space needed for the homing equipment and this turbine also required the warhead to be reduced from 600 lb (270 kg) of HBX to 350 lb (160 kg).

The intended purpose for this torpedo went through a series of changes. Although first considered as a free-dropped weapon from aircraft, as for the Mark 13, Project Kingfisher in August 1944 set out to develop stand-off weapons which could be launched from outside the defensive range of target capital ships. It was recognized that US ships in the Pacific at this period were now heavily defended by AA, making attacks against them too costly to be successful. Once the attacks against the Japanese home islands began, a similar challenge would be faced by the US Navy and so a weapon to defeat it would be needed. Soon after Kingfisher, the Japanese began their kamikaze attacks as a more drastic approach to the same problem.

Kingfisher A was an interim project for an unpowered glide bomb, carrying a homing torpedo.

Kingfisher C was a more developed version, carried by a powered missile, the AUM-2 Petrel. This offered greater range, but then required its own guidance too. The choice was made, early on, that this would be one of the newly developed jet engines rather than the simpler rocket motors used by the British – the Fairchild J44 engine finally chosen did not run until 1948. Once WWII was over, the need for the weapon was less urgent and development slowed.

Kingfisher began as a range extender for attacks against surface ships, although it was questioned whether these lighter torpedoes would be adequately effective against those targets. It was also realized that the main threat at this time was from submarines, not surface ships, (Note: After the Great Marianas Turkey Shoot of June 1944, the Japanese avoided major ship-on-ship actions and focused on a war of attrition by land defences.) and Kingfisher's stand-off design was useful here too. As the British had discovered with Hedgehog and Squid, a flying weapon could arrive on the position of a detected target much faster than a torpedo could, so not allowing it time to evade or escape. The acoustic homing which had been needed to make the torpedoes self-targeting against a large target (Note: Traditional torpedoes were aimed on a compass bearing, from a submarine which had calculated this to allow for target movement with the aid of the complex Torpedo Data Computer. As the entry point of the stand-off torpedo was unpredictable, a simple target bearing calculation would be inadequate and homing was required.) could also be developed to make them into submarine hunters. For the Mark 21, this 'feature creep' seems to have caused more delay than progress - attempting to improve their homing adequately caused the Mod 0 project to be abandoned. Submarines only required a small warhead to damage them and so the lighter Mark 35 torpedo became the favored design for an all-purpose air-launchable torpedo. This, in turn, was simplified as the air-launch-only Mark 41 torpedo, which became the payload for the AUM-N-2 Petrel in service through the mid-1950s.

Development of this torpedo was discontinued and it was not used in service to any extent.

== See also ==
- Mark 21 Mod 0 torpedo, a similar but less successful project, with homing developed by Westinghouse, and using an electric motor.
- Mark 35 torpedo, a multi-role torpedo, also considered with the SUM-N-2 Grebe rocket as part of the surface-launched 'Kingfisher E' concept
- Mark 43 torpedo (1951), the first successful US air-launched ASW torpedo in service
