= Mk22 =

Mk22 may refer to:

== Military ==
- Barrett MRAD, adopted as the Mk 22 Advanced Sniper Rifle by the U.S. military
- Mark 22 nuclear bomb, United States thermonuclear test
- Mark 22 torpedo, United States prototype torpedo
- Smith & Wesson Model 39, pistol formerly used by the United States Naval Special Warfare Command as the Mk 22 Mod 0

== Other uses ==
- M.K. 22, an Israeli animated sitcom
