= Mark 21 Mod 0 torpedo =

Mark 21 torpedo
- Type: Anti-surface ship torpedo
- Place of origin: United States

Service history
- In service: never in service

Production history
- Designer: Westinghouse Electric Corporation
- Designed: 1943
- Variants: Mark 21 Mod 2 torpedo

Specifications
- Mass: approx. 2,300 lb (1,000 kg)
- Length: 161 in (4.1 m)
- Diameter: 22.5 in (570 mm)
- Warhead: HBX
- Warhead weight: 400 lb (180 kg)
- Detonation mechanism: Mark 8 contact exploder
- Engine: Electric
- Maximum speed: 25 kn (29 mph; 46 km/h)
- Guidance system: passive acoustic homing
- Launch platform: Aircraft

The Mark 21 torpedo, designated Mark 21 Mod 0 was a passive acoustic homing torpedo designed in 1943 by Westinghouse Electric Corporation. The Mark 21 successfully passed launching tests in 1943, however, due to difficulties encountered by Westinghouse, the project was abandoned after a few development models had been built.

It was based on the widely used Mark 13 torpedo. Propulsion was switched to electric, but weight restrictions limited the speed available.

== See also ==
- Mark 21 Mod 2 torpedo, a similar but more successful project, with homing developed by Bell Labs, and using a steam turbine.
