= Mark 25 torpedo =

- Type: Anti-surface ship torpedo
- Place of origin: United States

Service history
- In service: never in service

Production history
- Designer: Division of War Research, Columbia University
- Designed: 1943
- Manufacturer: Naval Ordnance Station Forest Park
- Produced: 1946
- No. built: 25

Specifications
- Mass: 2306 pounds
- Length: 161 inches
- Diameter: 22.5 inches
- Effective firing range: 2500 yards
- Warhead: Mk 25
- Warhead weight: 725 pounds
- Engine: Turbine
- Propellant: Alcohol
- Maximum speed: 40 knots
- Guidance system: Gyroscope
- Launch platform: Aircraft

The Mark 25 torpedo was an aircraft-launched anti-surface ship torpedo designed by the Division of War Research of Columbia University in 1943 as a replacement for the Mark 13 torpedo.

The Mark 25 was designed for higher speed, greater strength and more ease of manufacture compared to the Mark 13. Like the Mark 13, it used a wet heater steam turbine engine. Naval Ordnance Station Forest Park built twenty-five units in 1946 for test and evaluation, however, this torpedo was never mass-produced due to the large inventory of Mark 13s left over at the end of World War II. Moreover, the role of Naval aircraft changed from a torpedo strike platform to an antisubmarine warfare platform.
