= Mark 22 torpedo =

- Type: Anti-surface ship torpedo
- Place of origin: United States

Service history
- In service: never in service

Production history
- Designer: Bell Telephone Laboratories; Westinghouse Electric
- Designed: 1944
- No. built: 2 prototypes

Specifications
- Mass: 3060 pounds
- Length: 246 inches
- Diameter: 21 inches
- Effective firing range: 4000 yards
- Warhead: HBX
- Warhead weight: 500 pounds
- Engine: Electric
- Maximum speed: 29 knots
- Guidance system: Gyroscope
- Launch platform: Submarines

The Mark 22 torpedo, was an active acoustic homing torpedo developed by Bell Telephone Laboratories and Westinghouse Electric 1944. Development of this torpedo was discontinued at the end of World War II.

== See also ==
- Mark 21 torpedo, two acoustic homing torpedo projects, one developed by Bell Labs and one by Westinghouse.
- American 21-inch torpedo
