= GT-1 (missile) =

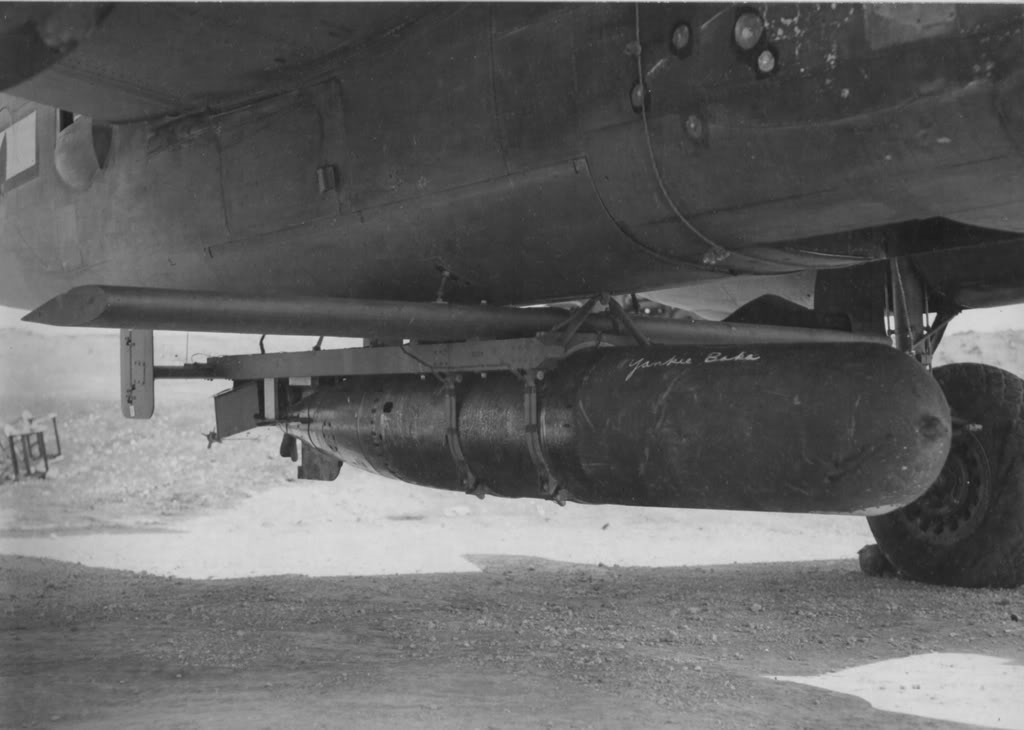
- GT-1 glide torpedo mounted on North American B-25J Mitchell medium bomber
- Type: Air-to-surface missile
- Place of origin: United States

Service history
- In service: 1944-1945
- Used by: United States Army Air Forces

Production history
- Designed: 1942-1943
- Manufacturer: Aeronca

Specifications
- Wingspan: 12 feet (3.7 m)
- Warhead: Mk 13 Mod 2A aerial torpedo
- Warhead weight: 600 pounds (270 kg) explosive
- Engine: None
- Operational range: 25 miles (40 km)
- Maximum speed: 260 miles per hour (420 km/h)
- Guidance system: Preset plus paravane
- Launch platform: B-25 Mitchell

The GT-1 (Glide Torpedo 1) was an early form of stand-off weaponry developed by the United States Army Air Forces during World War II. Intended to deliver an aerial torpedo at a safe range from the launching aircraft, the weapon proved successful enough in testing to be approved for operational use, and the GT-1 saw limited use in the closing stages of the war.

== Design and development ==
The GT-1 was derived from the GB-1 series of glide bombs, developed by Aeronca for the United States Army Air Forces. The weapon's airframe was inexpensive and simply designed, with a basic wing and twin tails attached to a cradle for carrying the payload. The flight path of the GT-1 was determined by a preset autopilot that kept the weapon on a steady course after release.

The GT-1 was usually released from its carrier aircraft at an altitude of 10,000 feet (3,000 m); this provided a standoff range of as much as 25 miles (40 km) under ideal conditions. The GT-1's warload consisted of a Mark 13 Mod 2A aerial torpedo. The GT-1 was fitted with a paravane, trailing 20 feet (6.1 m) below the main body of the craft; upon the paravane's striking the surface of the water, explosive bolts would fire to release the torpedo, which would then execute a preset search pattern to locate and destroy its target.

== Operational history ==
Initially tested during 1943, the GT-1 proved to be successful, and was issued to a single operational unit for service. Launched from North American B-25 Mitchell bombers, the GT-1 saw brief operational service late in the war; three missions are known to have been flown using the weapon from Okinawa in late 1945. On one mission, against Kagoshima, eleven of thirteen GT-1s launched successfully entered the water; three explosions were reported, near a fleet carrier, a light carrier, and a freighter. The Boeing B-17 Flying Fortress was also capable of carrying the GT-1.

Following the end of World War II, the aerial torpedo rapidly fell out of favor as a weapon of war against surface ships, and the 'GT' category of weapons was abolished in 1947.

== See also ==
- Project Kingfisher
