= Mark 13 torpedo =

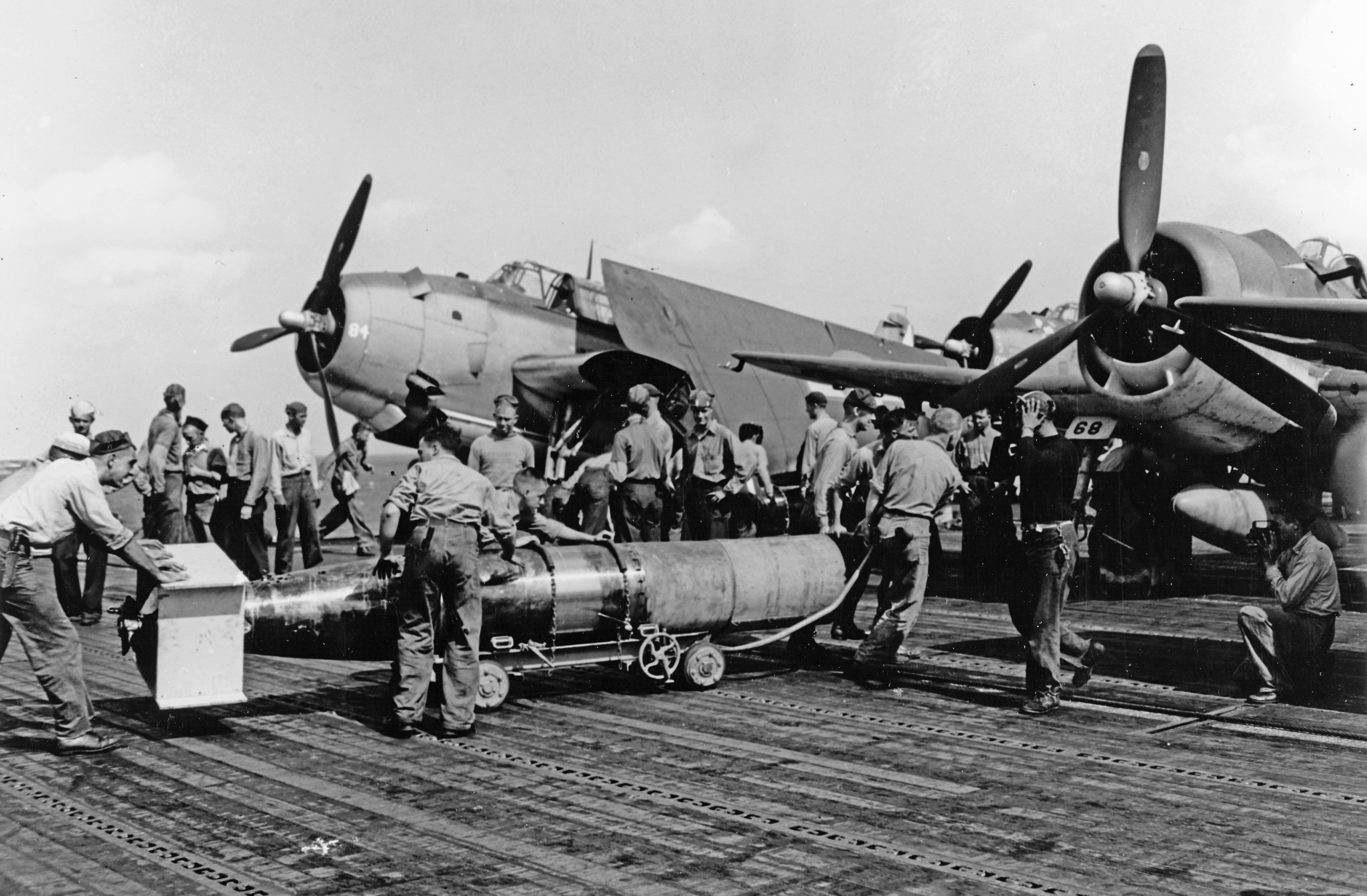
- A Mark 13B torpedo being loaded onto a Grumman TBF Avenger aboard the aircraft carrier USS Wasp in 1944; the torpedo is fitted with wooden breakaway nose and tail protection which is shed upon hitting the water
- Type: Aerial torpedo
- Place of origin: United States

Service history
- In service: 1936–1953
- Used by: United States Navy United States Marine Corps
- Wars: World War II, Korean War (Only on the Hwacheon Dam)

Production history
- Designer: Bureau of Ordnance; Bureau of Aeronautics
- Designed: 1925
- Manufacturer: Naval Torpedo Station; Pontiac Motor Division; Amertorp Corporation; International Harvester
- Produced: 1942–1945
- No. built: 16,600
- Variants: Mod 1 Mod 2 Mod 2A – Mod 13

Specifications
- Mass: 2,216 pounds (1,005 kg)
- Length: 161 inches (4.1 m)
- Diameter: 22.5 inches (57 cm)
- Effective firing range: 6,300 yards (5.8 km)
- Warhead: Torpex
- Warhead weight: Mod 0: 400 pounds (180 kg); Mod 2: 600 pounds (270 kg)
- Detonation mechanism: Mk 4, contact; Mk 8, contact
- Engine: Turbine
- Maximum speed: 33.5 knots (62.0 km/h)
- Guidance system: gyroscope
- Launch platform: Douglas TBD Devastator; Grumman TBF Avenger; Curtiss SB2C Helldiver; Mark 1 Lightweight Rack PT boats

The Mark 13 torpedo was the U.S. Navy's most common aerial torpedo of World War II. It was the first American torpedo to be originally designed for launching from aircraft only. They were also used on PT boats.

== Design ==
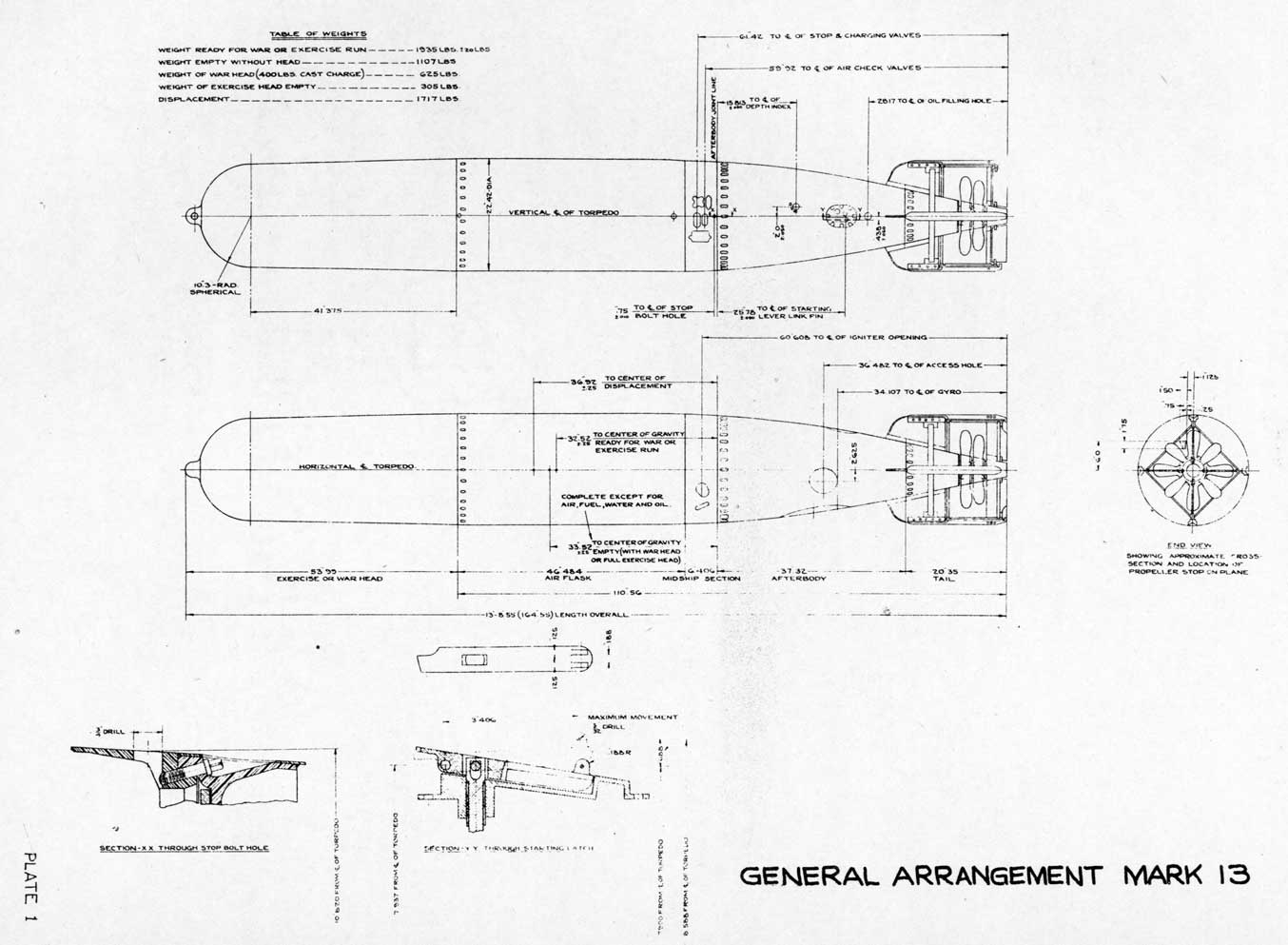
Mark 13 torpedo's general arrangement, as published in a service manual

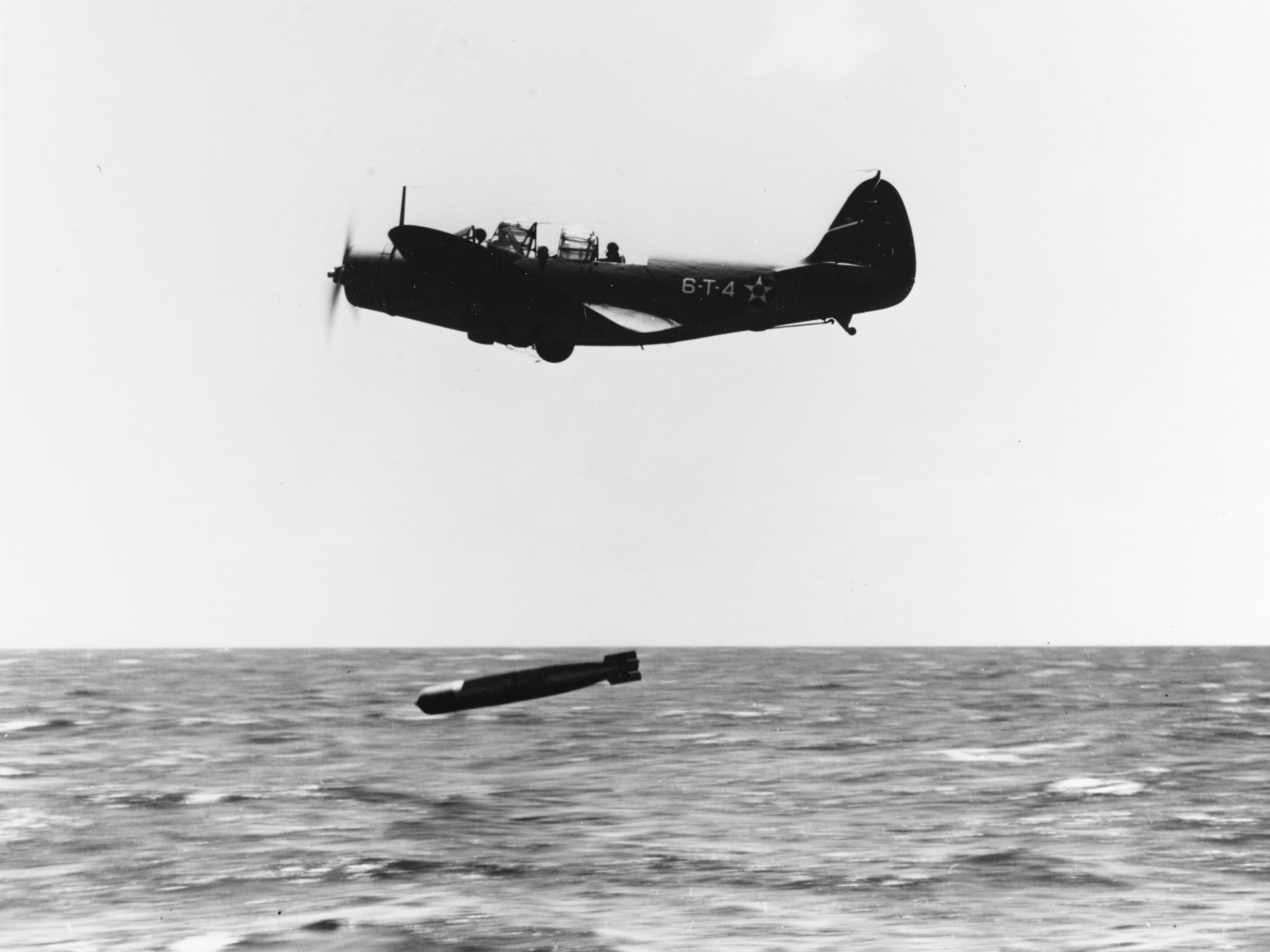
A Douglas TBD Devastator making a practice drop with a Mark 13 torpedo, October 20, 1941

Originating in a 1925 design study, the Mark 13 was subject to changing USN requirements through its early years with resulting on-and-off development. Early models — even when dropped low to the water at slow speeds — were prone to running on the surface, or not running at all. By late 1944, the design had been modified to allow reliable drops from as high as 2,400 ft (730 m), at speeds up to 410 knots (760 km/h). The final Mark 13 weighed 2,216 lb (1,005 kg); 600 lb (270 kg) of the high explosive Torpex.

The Mark 13 was designed with unusually squat dimensions for its type: diameter was 22.5 inches (570 mm) and length 13 feet 5 inches (4.09 m). In the water, the Mark 13 could reach a speed of 33.5 knots (62.0 km/h; 38.6 mph) for up to 6,300 yards (5,800 m). The Mark 13 ran 12.8 knots (23.7 km/h; 14.7 mph) slower than the Mark 14 torpedo, a characteristic which, along with a lesser mass, lesser negative buoyancy and the lack of a magnetic influence feature in its Mark IV exploder, meant that it did not suffer from some of the same problems as its larger siblings. 17,000 were produced during the war.

== Wartime development ==
By 1942, poor combat performance had made it apparent that there were problems with the Mark 13.

The Committee assigned the California Institute of Technology to undertake the first systematic study of the dynamics of aerial launched torpedoes. Tank tests using scale models revealed that the "low and slow" approach that had been presumed necessary for a successful drop was actually counterproductive: striking the water at a flat angle frequently caused the after body of the torpedo to "slap", damaging the mechanism. Full scale testing simulated aerial torpedo drops under controlled conditions by pneumatically launching full size torpedoes down a 300 feet (91 m) slide on California's Morris Dam into a mountain lake known for its clarity, allowing all aspects of the water entry to be examined utilizing high-speed photography. Fragile or vulnerable components were improved, tested, refined, and tested again. Improved components were shipped to Newport Rhode Island for air drop testing – 4,300 drops in all. The Caltech study led to the development of "drag rings" that slowed and stabilized the torpedo in flight and cushioned its impact with the water and "shroud rings" (also known as the "ring tail") that reinforced the vulnerable tail fins. They also tested and developed a box-shaped wooden tail that stabilized the torpedo in flight and absorbed energy as it was stripped off as the torpedo entered the water, based on the Kyoban series of similar aerodynamic tails, first developed in 1936 by the Japanese for their Type 91 torpedo used at the attack on Pearl Harbor, first observed by the U.S. at the Battle of the Coral Sea on 8 May 1942.

Experiment soon revealed that optimum water entry angles were approximately 22-32 degrees relative to the plane of the surface: the torpedo might plunge as deep as 50 feet (15 m) but it would return to its set depth and bearing if the mechanism was undamaged. This enabled the US Navy to develop a series of attack profiles that varied the combination of speed and altitude to produce the ideal 22-32 degree water entry angle. For the Grumman TBF Avenger torpedo bomber this meant drop altitudes as high as 800 feet (240 m) and drop speeds as high as 260 knots (480 km/h) which the Avenger could achieve by diving to the release point. Multiple attack profile options also allowed strike planners to de-conflict attack routes by assigning each torpedo squadron a different attack profile, greatly reducing the risk of mid-air collision over the target. Finally, there was the added benefit of increased range, as the torpedo traveled a significant distance in the air before entering the water (up to 1,000 yards (910 m) when released at 800 feet (240 m) and 300 mph (480 km/h)). Combined with radar that delivered the exact range to the target, the results proved to be remarkable:

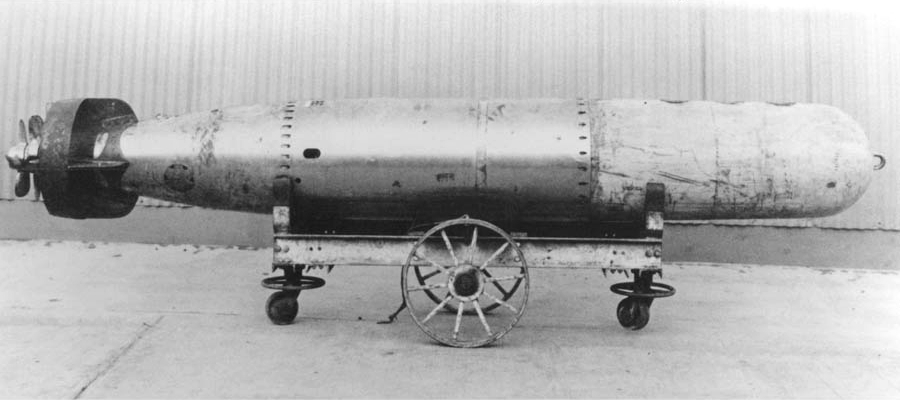
Mark 13 Model 6 with shroud ring

New planes outdated [the] Torpedo Mark 13, but drag rings and stabilizers renewed its usefulness. Throughout 1943 torpedo performance remained poor, but the following year witnessed a revolution in the behavior of the Mark 13. Minor changes to the propeller blades and a reduction in gyro damage helped, but the greatest improvement resulted from the stabilizing effects of two appendages--the drag ring and the shroud ring.

The first assembly, known familiarly as the pickle barrel, was readied for use by 1944. Early experiments with parachutes attached to aircraft torpedoes had demonstrated that a drag had a beneficial effect on the airflight characteristics of the weapon. While parachutes did not appear [to be] the solution to the problem, discovery of the principle involved led to the development of the drag ring. Constructed of plywood, the ring was attached to the head of a torpedo and served as a stabilizer for the period that the weapon was airborne. Oscillations were reduced and the ring effected a 40 percent deceleration in air speed, then acted as a shock absorber when the torpedo struck water. Better water entry, a byproduct of air stabilization, reduced damage so substantially that pilots were able to increase the heights and speeds at which torpedoes were released.

The drag ring went a long way toward making the Mark 13 a reliable torpedo, but underwater performance still called for improvement. By midsummer 1944, however, the shroud ring developed by the California Institute of Technology completed the torpedo revolution that had seemed so remote the year before. Almost an exact duplicate of an assembly developed by Newport in 1871, the shroud ring was made to fit over the tail blades of the torpedo. Known to pilots as the ring tail, it produced a steady water run by reducing hooks and broaches and eliminating much of the water roll which characterized the Mark 13. Speed and range were reduced but slightly. Early tests showed that ring-tailed torpedoes took too deep an initial dive, but readjustments of controls soon remedied that last obstacle. Hot, straight, and normal runs approached 100 percent, and the once critical battle reports soon became enthusiastic in praise of the Mark 13. Even psychologically, the appendages contributed to success, since the external design of the torpedo equipped with a pickle barrel and ring tail and the improved appearance of its underwater travel caught the fancy of the airmen.

To speed the availability of the modified torpedo the Bureau built tail assemblies with the shroud ring attached, then sent them to the fleet as substitutes for the equipment on hand. By the fall of 1944 the revamped weapon had a wide distribution. As a result of the new improvements, torpedo drops at altitudes up to 800 feet (240 m) and at speeds up to 300 knots (560 km/h) were authorized. Experience soon indicated that these limits could be extended even further. On one occasion in early 1945, 6 Mark 13 torpedoes were released from altitudes between 5,000 and 7,000 feet (1,500 and 2,100 m); 5 out of the 6 were observed to run hot, straight, and normal. Combat use increased rapidly and the new effectiveness seemed out of all proportion to the changes made. On one air strike on April 7, 1945, Mark 13's sent to the bottom the 45,000 ton (sic) battleship Yamato, a light cruiser, and several destroyers. Months before the end of the war the Mark 13 was universally accepted as the best aircraft torpedo owned by any nation.

== Deployment on PT boats ==
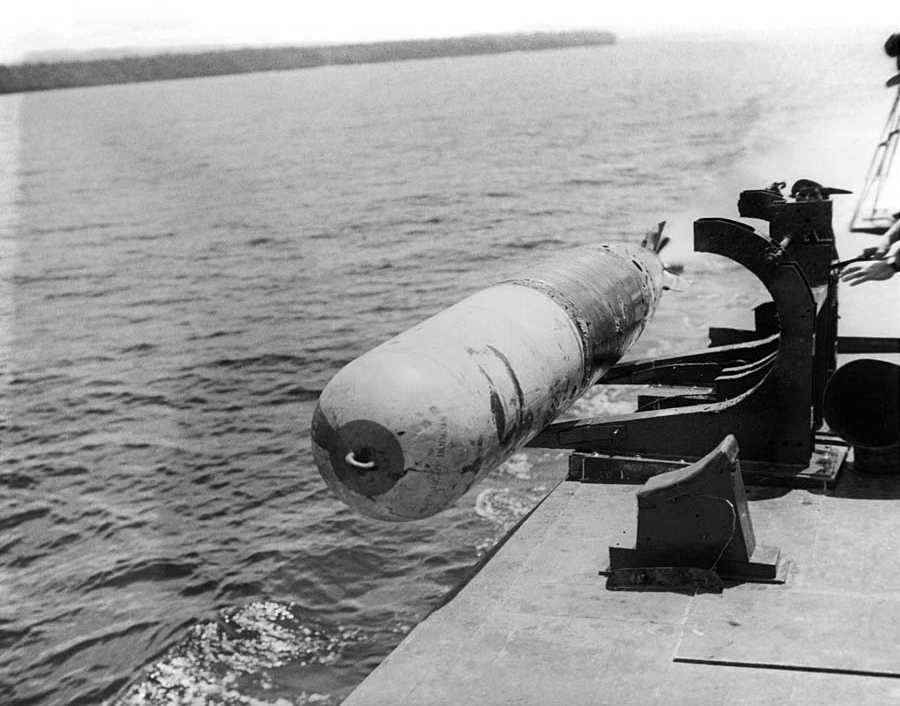
A Mark 13 being launched from a PT-boat

In 1942, US Navy Patrol Torpedo (PT) boats operating in the South Pacific were experiencing shortages of 21-inch (53 cm) Mark 8 and Mark 10 torpedoes and confronting large numbers of Japanese Daihatsu barges, which were generally too shallow to attack with torpedoes. Installing larger batteries of heavy machine guns and cannon on PT boats to deal with the barges was attempted. Such installations caused weight and stability problems, and torpedoes were still needed to counter larger Japanese vessels such as destroyers and cruisers.

One solution, implemented in 1943, was to replace each of the PT Boat's two to four Mark 8 torpedoes, and their Mark 18 torpedo tubes, with the significantly lighter Mark 13, carried in lightweight Mark 1 launching racks, at a total saving of more than 1,400 pounds (635 kg) each. The shorter Mark 13 also took up less deck space. The racks took advantage of the Mark 13's air-drop capability by simply allowing the torpedoes to roll over the side, eliminating the risks of a "hot run" within the tube and the flare of burning grease that sometimes gave away the PT boat's position upon firing. The Mark 13 also had the advantage of a significantly larger warhead (600-pound (270 kg) vs. 466-pound (211 kg)), containing the significantly more powerful explosive Torpex, which was approximately 1.5 times more powerful per unit of weight than TNT. The Mark 13's shorter range and slower speed were considered acceptable tradeoffs for boats that usually operated at night and relied on stealth to reach firing position.

== See also ==
- Mark 21 Mod 2 torpedo, a development for use in the AUM-N-2 Petrel missile.
- Mark 25 torpedo
- GT-1 (missile)
