= AUM-N-4 Diver =

- Type: Anti-ship missile
- Place of origin: United States

Service history
- Used by: United States Navy

Production history
- Designer: National Bureau of Standards
- Designed: 1946-1949

Specifications
- Warhead: Torpedo
- Engine: Rocket

The AUM-N-4 Diver, also known as Kingfisher D and AUM-4, was a proposed anti-ship and anti-submarine missile, developed for use by the United States Navy in the late 1940s. It was intended to carry a rocket-propelled torpedo that used a single rocket motor for both airborne and underwater propulsion; due to technical issues encountered in the development of the torpedo, no missiles were built before the program was cancelled.

== Design history ==
As part of Project Kingfisher, a program for the development of air-launched missiles for use in attacking enemy ships and surfaced submarines with torpedoes from stand-off range, development of the "Kingfisher D" missile was proposed in 1946 by the U.S. Navy's Bureau of Ordnance. The Kingfisher D was similar in concept to the Kingfisher C, which became the AUM-N-2 Petrel, but differed in that the torpedo the Kingfisher D carried was intended to have a dual-mode rocket engine, providing propulsion both to the missile in flight and to the torpedo itself underwater, following the release of the torpedo from the missile to allow it to make its terminal run to the target.

Under contract to the National Bureau of Standards, work on Kingfisher D, given the designation AUM-4 in September 1947 and the definitive designation AUM-N-4 in 1948, continued through the late 1940s. The torpedo was defined as a 1,000 pounds (450 kg) weapon; however, the difficulties encountered in its development meant that a feasible weapon could not be produced. Without the intended torpedo for it to carry, the Diver missile was no longer required, and the program was cancelled prior to 1950.
