= Helmover torpedo =

British WWII torpedo

The Helmover torpedo or Helmore projector was a British air-launched, radio-directed torpedo developed in 1944. It was intended for action against enemy shipping but was not brought into military use because of the surrender of the Japanese navy in 1945.

== Development ==
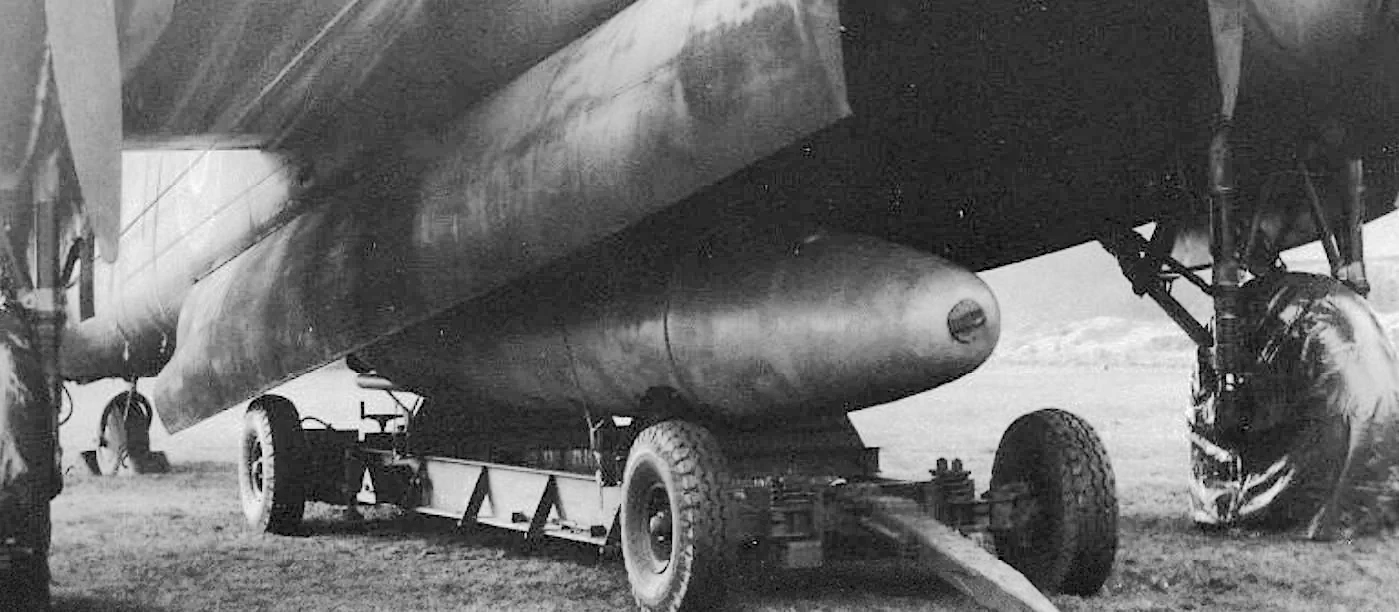
Helmover torpedo under the bomb bay of an Avro Lancaster

Following the success of Germany's Operation Cerberus in February 1942, when three German warships passed through the English Channel undeterred by the threat of British air and sea attacks, William Helmore of the Ministry of Aircraft Production envisaged a large, long-range torpedo to be dropped from an Avro Lancaster bomber and guided to its target by a de Havilland Mosquito command aircraft. He took his idea to Alan Muntz & Co (the firm already manufacturing Helmore's Turbinlite airborne searchlight) for evaluation. Muntz reported favourably, and started work on the design. GEC's research division at Wembley was engaged to develop the radio control. J. Stone & Co of Deptford, marine engineers, was given a contract to prepare scale models for testing in readiness for full-scale production. In September 1944 the Rolls-Royce Flight Test Establishment at Hucknall took over the project (under the name of Helmore projector or Helmover) with Stone's continuing to produce the hull and propellers.

A test of the radio guidance using an unarmed scale model of the torpedo was conducted on Queen Mary Reservoir, Staines, on 11 May 1944. The test was regarded as successful, even though during the proceedings radio control over the device was lost and it holed the Royal Air Force Marine Branch launch conducting the trial. It was found that the range of the radio signal was between 3 and 10 miles. The first test of the complete system took place off the Isle of Wight on 4 February 1945. Although the controlling Mosquito had to fly in a continuous "figure-of-eight" pattern to match its speed with the torpedo's 40 knots, making it difficult to keep sight of the exhaust plume from the torpedo's engine (or its wake when submerged), the test was considered a success and 100 units were ordered.

== Design ==
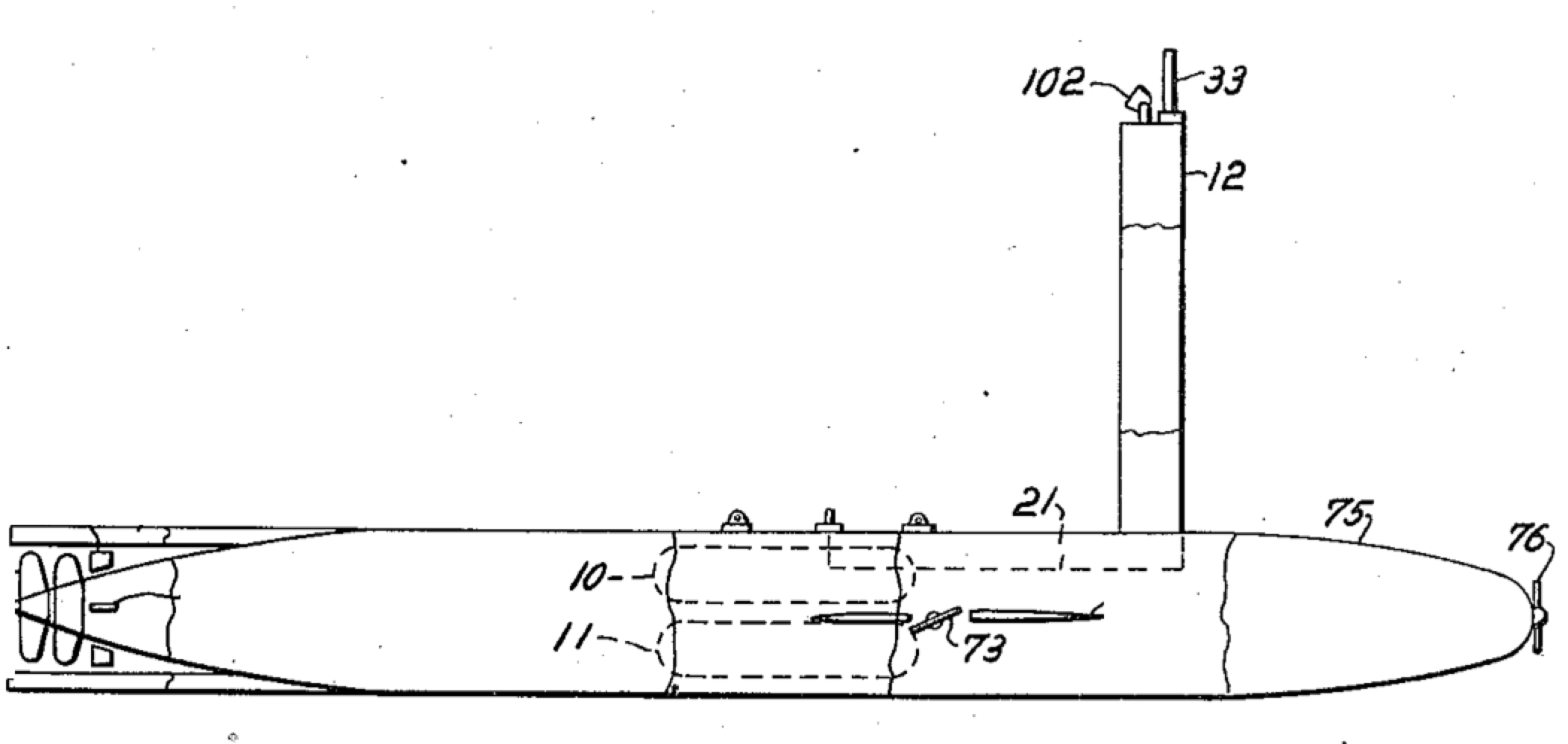
Schematic view: 10 & 11 — compressed air tanks 12 — hollow mast 21 — slot to receive mast 33 — aerial 73 — air valve 75 & 76 — warhead & fuze 102 — infrared beacon

The size of the torpedo was determined by the dimensions of the Lancaster's bomb bay. Length was 29 feet (8.8 m) with a diameter of 39.5 inches (1,000 mm). Overall weight was 11,500 pounds (5,200 kg), of which 1 long ton (1,000 kg) was RDX explosive. The torpedo's hull was divided into three sections. The fore section contained the warhead; the mid-section contained the fuel tank, radio receiver and compressed-air tanks; the aft section contained an internal combustion engine and the control gear. There were separate compressed air systems: one at low pressure (60 pounds per square inch (4.1 standard atmospheres)) to drive the directional gyroscopes and the control surfaces, and one at high pressure (2,000 psi (140 atm)) to supply the engine when submerged. To achieve the desired range of at least 25 miles (40 km) an internal combustion engine was used. Rolls Royce selected their 550-horsepower (410-kilowatt) Meteor for this, partly because it could be assembled from salvaged parts from crashed or otherwise unserviceable Merlin aero engines, so not using valuable resources on what was intended to be a "one-way" mission.

The propellers were of the contra-rotating type. Air for the engine was drawn in through a hollow mast, 6 feet (2 m) long, pivoted upwards from a slot along the top of the torpedo after the unit entered the water. There was an infrared light ("102" in image) at the top of the mast, directed rearwards towards the following aircraft to aid tracking at night. An automatic valve prevented water entry from high waves, upon which air could be briefly drawn from a compressed air tank through a valve ("73" in image). As fuel was used up, seawater was gradually admitted to flexible bags within the hull to retain the required degree of buoyancy. At a distance of about three miles from the target, under direction from the command aircraft, the mast was folded into its slot and the hull was allowed to submerge completely, with air released continuously from the low-pressure tank (this in turn replenished from the high-pressure tank through a pressure regulator) to supply the engine.

Guidance continued from the command aircraft until the target was hit; radio signals could be received down to a depth of 2 feet (0.6 m). If anti-submarine nets were encountered, an explosive piston was deployed to launch the unit over the obstruction, or it was made to dive beneath them. The war ended before the system could be deployed.
