= Mark 35 torpedo =

Anti-submarine torpedo

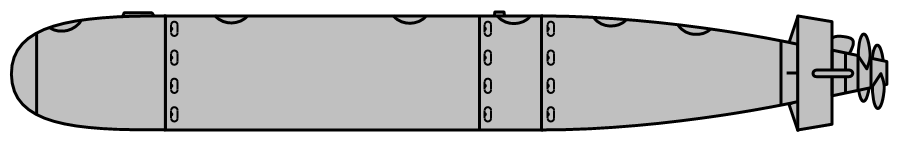
- Type: Acoustic torpedo
- Place of origin: United States

Service history
- In service: 1949–1960
- Used by: United States Navy

Production history
- Designer: General Electric
- Designed: 1944
- Manufacturer: General Electric
- Produced: 1949–1952
- No. built: 400

Specifications
- Mass: Mk 35: 1770 pounds Mk 41: 1327 pounds
- Length: Mk 35: 162 inches Mk 41: 120 inches
- Diameter: 21 inches
- Effective firing range: Mk 35: 15000 yards Mk 41: 8000 yards
- Warhead: HBX-1
- Warhead weight: Mk 35: 270 pounds Mk 41: 150 pounds
- Detonation mechanism: Mk 19 Mod 3 contact exploder
- Engine: Electric
- Maximum speed: Mk 35: 27 knots Mk 41: 25 knots
- Guidance system: Gyroscope, helix search
- Launch platform: Mk 35: Surface ships Mk 41: Aircraft, PGM

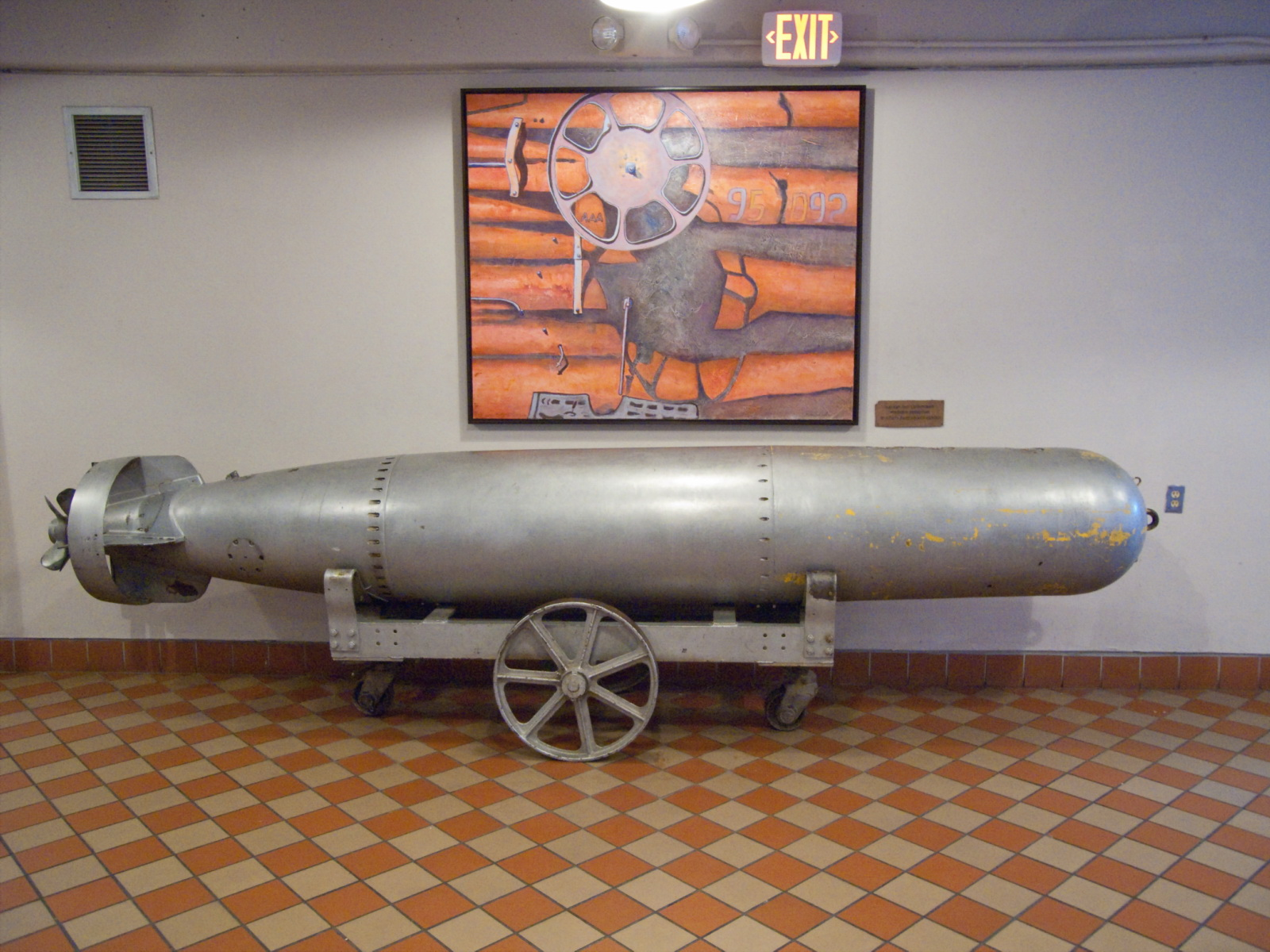
Side view of a Mark 35

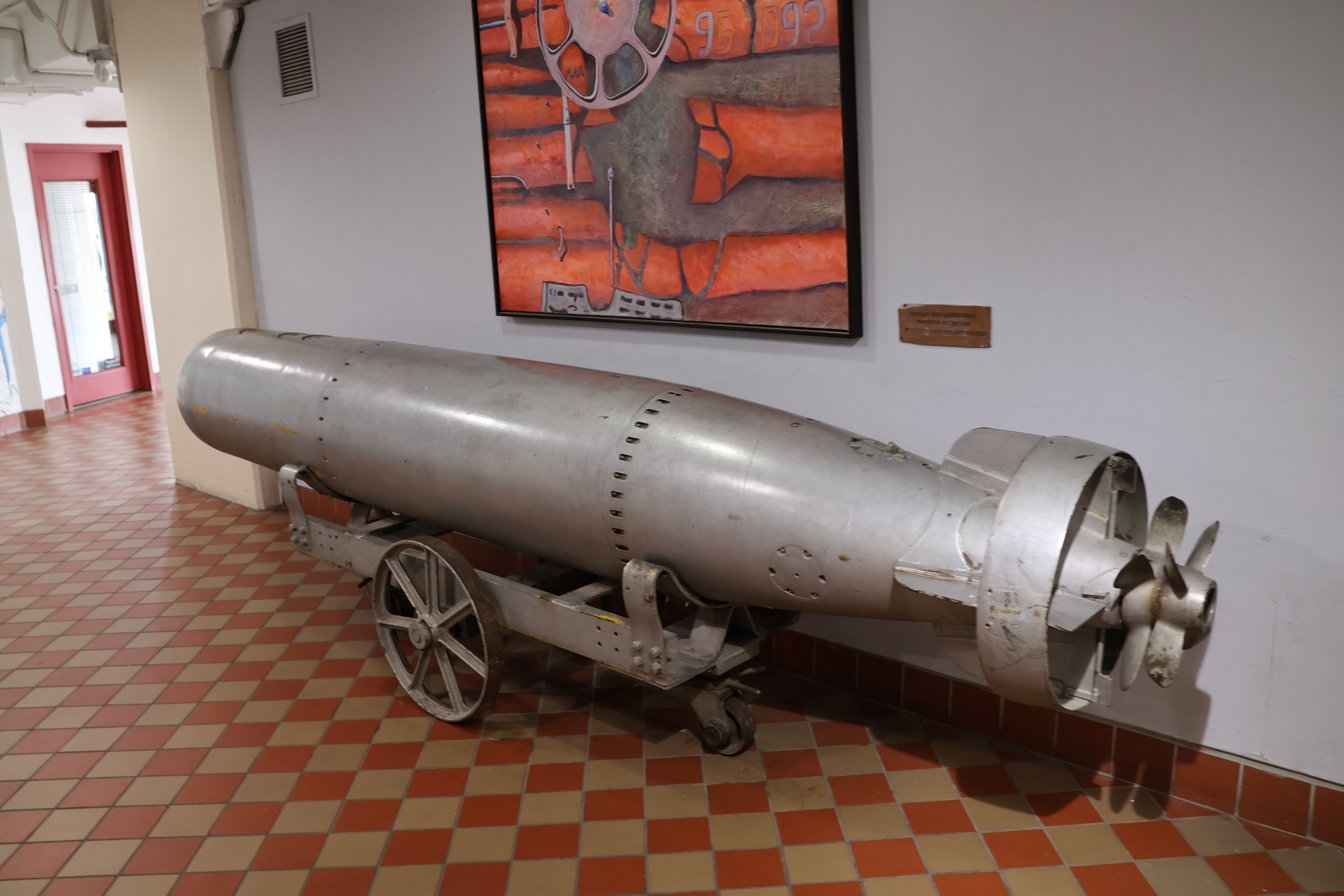
Rear view of a Mark 35

The Mark 35 torpedo was the first of the United States Navy deep-diving anti-submarine torpedoes designed for surface launch. This electrically propelled 21-inch (53-cm) torpedo was 162 inches (4.11 m) long, weighed 1,770 pounds (800 kg), and carried a 270-pound (120 kg) HBX warhead. This torpedo used one of the earliest active guidance systems and was introduced in 1949, and was classified as obsolete in the 1960s.

The Mark 35 torpedo was originally specified as the intended payload for the Grebe missile, before being replaced by the Mark 41 due to weight concerns.

== Mark 41 torpedo ==
A simplified and lighter weight version of the Mark 35 was developed, specifically for air-launched use. This eliminated any equipment not needed for air-launching, with a total mass of 1,327 pounds (602 kg). The warhead filler was reduced to a mass of 150 pounds (68 kg). The nose also became distinctively flat-fronted.

This torpedo was used as the payload in some ASW missiles, the AUM-N-2 Petrel and the SUM-N-2 Grebe.

== See also ==
- American 21-inch torpedo
