= AUM-N-2 Petrel =

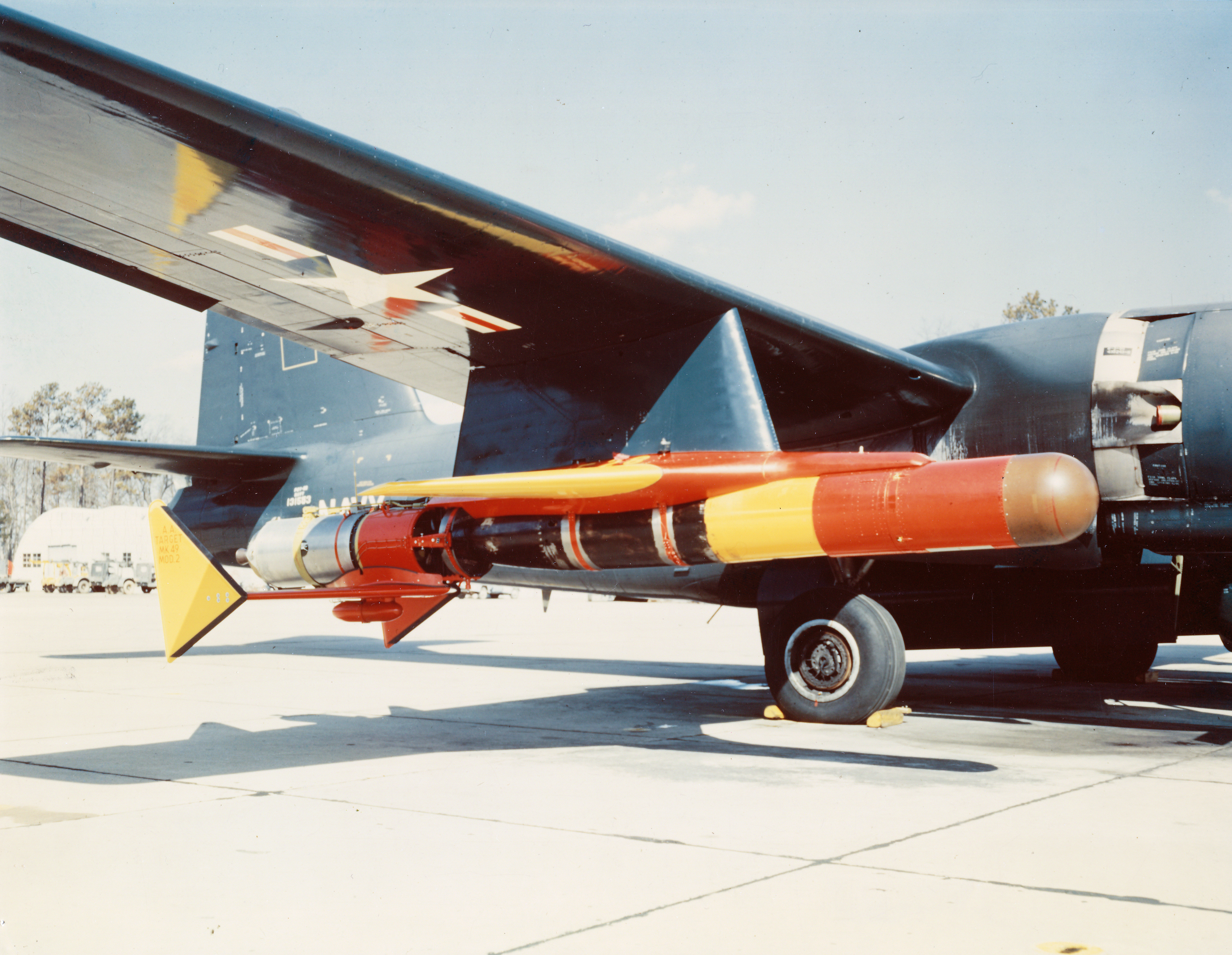
- A Petrel carried by a P2V Neptune aircraft
- Type: Anti-ship missile
- Place of origin: United States

Service history
- In service: 1956–59
- Used by: United States Navy

Production history
- Manufacturer: Fairchild Guided Missiles Division
- Produced: 1954–57

Specifications
- Mass: 3,800 lb (1,700 kg)
- Length: 24 ft (7.32 m)
- Diameter: 24 in (61 cm)
- Wingspan: 13 ft 2 in (401 cm)
- Warhead: Mark 41 torpedo
- Engine: Fairchild J44 turbojet 1,000 lbf (4.4 kN)
- Propellant: JP-4
- Operational range: 20 nmi (23 mi; 37 km)
- Maximum speed: 375 mph (604 km/h)

The AUM-N-2 Petrel, also known as Kingfisher C and AUM-2, was an air-to-surface missile produced as part of Project Kingfisher for the United States Navy. Intended for use against enemy surface ships and surfaced submarines, giving aircraft the ability to deliver aerial torpedoes from outside the range of defensive armament, it saw brief operational service in the late 1950s. The project was never considered a high priority by the Navy however, as it was useless against submerged submarines, which were considered the greatest potential threat.

Following its withdrawal from operational usage, the Petrel was used as a target drone, receiving the designation AQM-41A shortly before being retired from service altogether.

== Design and development ==
The development of the Petrel began in August 1944, when the U.S. Navy Bureau of Ordnance (BuOrd) began Project Kingfisher, intending to develop a series of standoff torpedo weapons. The "Kingfisher C", later designated AUM-2 and then as AUM-N-2 (for 'Air-to-Underwater Missile'), was designed as an air-launched jet-powered missile which carried a torpedo as its payload. Various different design options were considered for this missile; the final choice was a Mark 21 Mod 2 torpedo, 24 inches (610 mm) in diameter, with a Fairchild J44 turbojet engine providing 1,000 lbf (4.4 kN) thrust, wooden fins and wings 13 feet 2 inches (4.01 m) in span, and a nose fairing housing guidance equipment. On launch the 3,800-pound (1,700 kg), 24-foot (7.3 m) missile dropped to 200 feet (61 m) above the water and cruised at Mach 0.5 towards the target, using semi-active radar homing. Once the missile had reached a range of just under 4,900 feet (1,500 m) from its target, the engine would be shut down and all wings and fins jettisoned. The torpedo dropped on a free trajectory into the water and began to home in on the target. The weapon was suitable for use against surface targets only—primarily ships and surfaced submarines, with the Navy considering the weapon effective against targets traveling at up to 33 knots (61 km/h; 38 mph). The AUM-2 was usually carried by the Lockheed P2V Neptune, although the Grumman S2F Tracker was also considered as a potential carrier aircraft.

== Operational history ==
Under the authority of the National Bureau of Standards, tests of the AUM-2 began in 1951; by this time, the Mark 41 torpedo had replaced the Mark 21 Mod 2 as its payload. Development was transferred to the Guided Missiles Division of Fairchild Aircraft in 1954, with the missile being declared operational in 1956; the Petrel project was publicly revealed by Fairchild in the company's annual report for that year. The weapons were produced at the Fairchild Guided Missiles Division factory at Wyandanch, Long Island, New York; production was completed by 1957.

The Petrel was never considered a very high priority by the U.S. Navy, which was far more concerned about the threat from submarines than surface ships. New submarine designs powered by nuclear reactors, which could remain submerged indefinitely, were beginning to appear in the mid-1950s. The prospects of catching an enemy submarine on the surface were therefore receding, and more emphasis was being placed on underwater engagements, for which Petrel's radar homing was useless; the use of semi-active radar guidance also required the launching aircraft to continue closing on the target throughout the missile's flight, exposing it to a far greater danger from enemy defenses.

In February 1956, the weapons test ship USS Mississippi participated in tests of the Petrel. Later in 1956 patrol squadrons VP(HM)-13 on the Atlantic coast and VP(HM)-10 on the Pacific coast began working up with P2V-6M Neptune carrier aircraft; however in 1957 responsibility for the Petrel was transferred to the United States Navy Reserve units, with VP-834 being assigned as the Petrel's operational squadron in the USNR. By the start of 1959 the phaseout of the Petrel had begun, and on 29 January 1959 the Petrel program was cancelled entirely, no longer being considered necessary in the changing strategic environment. The Neptunes that had been converted for carrying the missile were restored to their normal configuration and reassigned, with the remaining Petrels were converted to serve as air-launched target drones.

In 1962, the remaining Petrel drones were redesignated AQM-41A under the new Tri-Service designation system; they were finally retired from service shortly afterwards.
