= Standoff weapon =

Weapons for attacking from beyond defender's range

Standoff weapons (or stand-off weapons) are missiles or bombs which are air-launched from a distance sufficient to allow the attacking vehicle to avoid defensive fire from the target area, and the effect of the weapon exploding on a close-by target. Their name reflects their operation while "standing off" outside the range of expected defensive fire. Typical stand-off weapons include cruise missiles, glide bombs and short-range ballistic missiles.
