= 1880s =

Decade

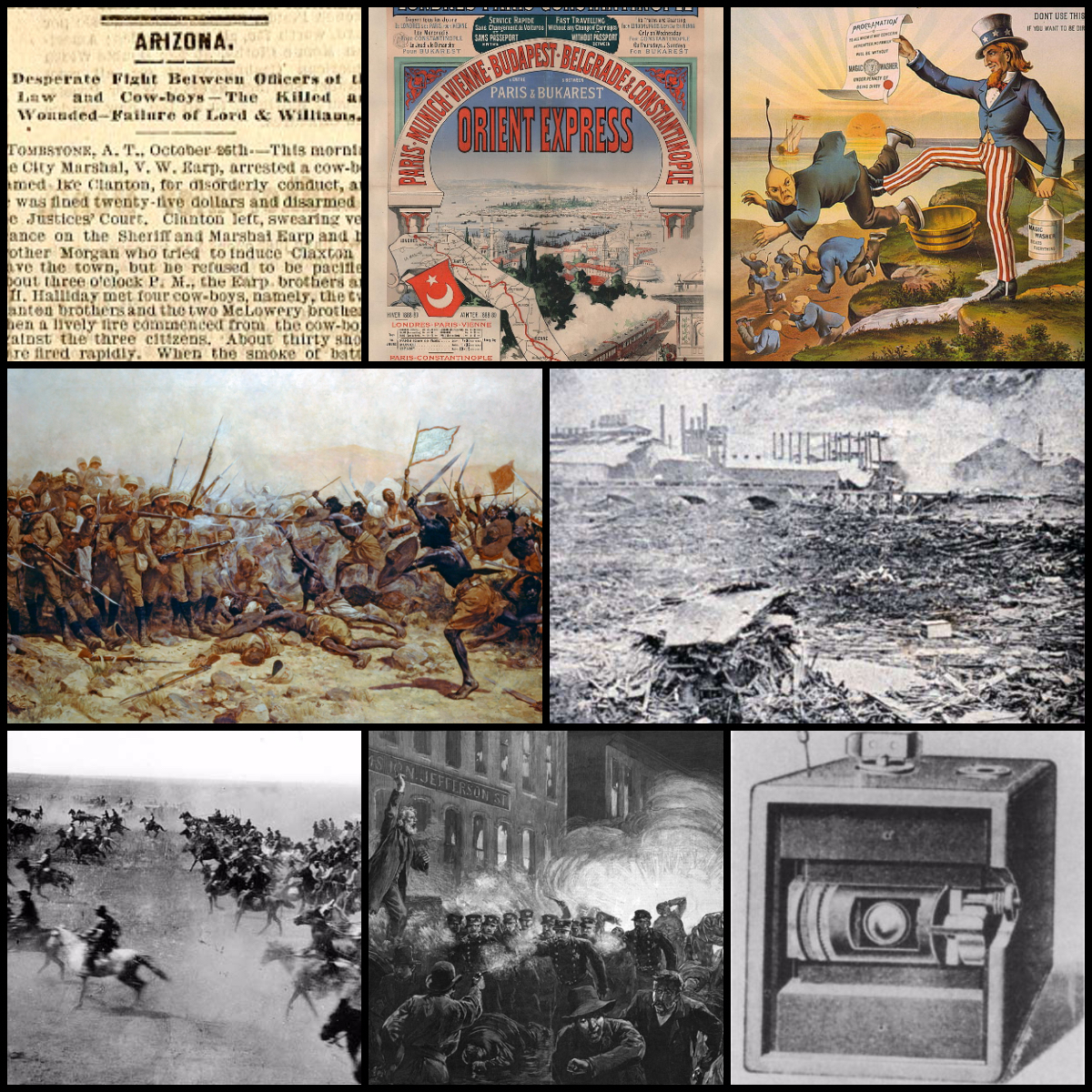
From top left, clockwise: A famous gunfight erupts at the O.K. Corral in Tombstone, Arizona in 1881; a long-distance passenger train called the Orient Express begins running between Paris and Constantinople in 1883; U.S. Congress bans Chinese immigrants from entering the U.S. for ten years, starting in 1882; South Fork Dam fails after heavy rainfall and floods the town of Johnstown, Pennsylvania, killing over two thousand people; George Eastman introduces the Kodak No 1 and the camera becomes an enormous success; Chicago's Haymarket Square is the scene of a bombing that kills at least seven police officers and four civilians during a massive protest from a labor rally and is generally considered the origin of modern May Day protests; settlers try to claim land during the Oklahoma Land Rush of 1889; combined groups of British and Sudanese forces on opposing sides fight during a nationalist uprising against the Khedive Tewfik Pasha.

The 1880s (pronounced "eighteen-eighties") was the decade that began on January 1, 1880, and ended on December 31, 1889. The decade took place during what historians call the Victorian Era in the History of the United Kingdom, the Belle Époque in the History of France, and the Gilded Age in the History of the United States,

The period was characterized in general by economic growth and prosperity in many parts of the world, especially Western Europe and North America. It occurred at the height of the Second Industrial Revolution and saw numerous developments in science and a sudden proliferation of electrical technologies, particularly in mass transit and telecommunications. It saw the emergence of modern cities and the foundation of many long-lived corporations, franchises, and brands, as well as the invention of the skyscraper. Elsewhere the major European colonial powers extended their empires, especially the British Empire and the French colonial empire.

The last living survivor from this decade was María Capovilla; she died in Ecuador in 2006.

== Politics and wars ==
=== Wars ===
- Aceh War (1873–1904)
- War of the Pacific (1879–1884)
- First Boer War (1880–1881)
- Mahdist War (1881–1899)
- 1882 Anglo-Egyptian War (1882)
  - 13 September 1882 — British troops occupy Cairo, and Egypt becomes a British protectorate.
- Sino-French War (1884–1885)
- Serbo-Bulgarian War (1885)

=== Internal conflicts ===
- American Indian Wars (Intermittently from 1622 to 1918)
  - 20 July 1881 — Sioux chief Sitting Bull leads the last of his fugitive people in surrender to United States troops at Fort Buford in Montana.
- Frequent lynchings of African Americans in Southern United States during the years 1880–1890
- Urabi Revolt (1879-1882)

=== Colonization ===
- France colonizes Indochina (1883)
- German colonization (1887)
- Increasing colonial interest and conquest in Africa leads representatives from Britain, France, Portugal, Germany, Belgium, Italy and Spain to divide Africa into regions of colonial influence at the Berlin Conference. This would be followed over the next few decades by conquest of almost the entirety of the remaining uncolonised parts of the continent, broadly along the lines determined. (1889)

=== Prominent political events ===
- 3 August 1881: The Pretoria Convention peace treaty is signed, officially ending the war between the Boers and Britain.
- 3 May 1882: The Chinese Exclusion Act was signed into law by President Chester A. Arthur.
- 20 May 1882: Germany, Austria-Hungary, and Italy form The Triple Alliance as a defensive military alliance
- 1884: International Meridian Conference in Washington D.C., held to determine the Prime Meridian of the world.
- 1884–1885: Berlin Conference, when the western powers divided Africa.
- The United States had five Presidents during the decade, the most since the 1840s. They were Rutherford B. Hayes, James A. Garfield, Chester A. Arthur, Grover Cleveland, and Benjamin Harrison.
- 20-22 June 1887: The Golden Jubilee of Queen Victoria was celebrated marking Queen Victoria's 50 year reign.
- 13 May 1888: Brazil abolishes slavery, the last country in the western hemisphere to do so.

== Disasters ==
- May to August, 1883: Krakatoa, a volcano in Indonesia, erupted cataclysmically; 36,000 people were killed, the majority being killed by the resulting tsunami.
- September 1887: The Yellow river flooded and killed about 900,000 people.
- 11 March to 14 March, 1888: The Great Blizzard of 1888 kills 400 in the eastern United States.
- May 1889: The Johnstown Flood occurred after the failure of the dam due to excessive rainfall in Pennsylvania. Nurse Clara Barton notably helped in the relief effort.

== Assassinations and attempts ==
Prominent assassinations, targeted killings, and assassination attempts include:

Year	Date	Name	Position	Culprits	Country	Description	Image
1881	13 March	Alexander II of Russia	Tsar of the Russian Empire	Pervomartovtsy and Narodnaya Volya	Russian Empire	Five Cossacks killed the Tsar by throwing a bomb at his carriage.	
1881	19 September	James A. Garfield	President of the United States	Charles J. Guiteau	United States	Garfield was leaving Washington for his summer vacation and was about to board a train at the Baltimore and Potomac Railroad Station when Guiteau appeared and shot Garfield twice.	
1882	2 March	Queen Victoria	Queen of the British Empire	Roderick Maclean	England	Maclean was offended when Victoria refused to accept one of his poems and so decided to shoot at the Queen as her carriage left Windsor railway station.	
1882	3 April	Jesse James	outlaw	Bob Ford	United States	While Jesse James was dusting a picture, Ford grabbed James' pistol and shooting him in the back.	
1882	6 May	Lord Frederick Cavendish	Chief Secretary for Ireland	members of Irish National Invincibles.	Ireland	While walking in the Phoenix Park in company with Thomas Henry Burke, he was assassinated Irish National Invincibles.	
1882	4 December	William Henry Haywood Tison	39th speaker of the Mississippi House of Representatives	J. Edward Sanders	United States	On December 4, 1882, J. Edward Sanders shot him in Baldwyn, Mississippi.	
1882	20 December	Franz Joseph I	Emperor of Austria	Guglielmo Oberdan	Austria-Hungary	Oberdan and Istrian pharmacist Donato Ragosa plotted an assassination attempt on the emperor. Oberdan's attempt failed, as he was arrested in Ronchi shortly after crossing the border into Austrian territory.	

- 1882 - Guglielmo Oberdan fails to assassinate Austria-Hungarian Emperor Franz Joseph and is executed

== Science and technology ==
=== Technology ===
- 1880: Oliver Heaviside of Camden Town, London, England receives a patent for the coaxial cable. In 1887, Heaviside introduced the concept of loading coils. In the 1890s, Mihajlo Idvorski Pupin would both create the loading coils and receive a patent of them, failing to credit Heaviside's work.
- 1880–1882: Development and commercial production of electric lighting was underway. Thomas Edison of Milan, Ohio, established Edison Illuminating Company on December 17, 1880. Based at New York City, it was the pioneer company of the electrical power industry. Edison's system was based on creating a central power plant equipped with electrical generators. Copper electrical wires would then connect the station with other buildings, allowing for electric power distribution. Pearl Street Station was the first central power plant in the United States. It was located at 255–257 Pearl Street in Manhattan on a site measuring 50 by 100 feet, just south of Fulton Street. It began with one direct current generator, and it started generating electricity on September 4, 1882, serving an initial load of 400 lamps at 85 customers. By 1884, Pearl Street Station was serving 508 customers with 10,164 lamps.
- 1880–1886: Charles F. Brush of Euclid, Ohio, and Brush Electric Light Company installed carbon arc lights along Broadway, New York City. A small generating station was established at Manhattan's 25th Street. The electric arc lights went into regular service on December 20, 1880. The new Brooklyn Bridge of 1883 had seventy arc lamps installed in it. By 1886, there was a reported number of 1,500 arc lights installed in Manhattan.
- 1880–1883: James Wimshurst of Poplar, London, England invents the Wimshurst Machine.
- 1881–1885: Stefan Drzewiecki of Podolia, Russian Empire finishes his submarine-building project (which had begun in 1879). The crafts were constructed at Nevskiy Shipbuilding and Machinery works at Saint Petersburg. Altogether, 50 units were delivered to the Ministry of War. They were reportedly deployed as part of the defense of Kronstadt and Sevastopol. In 1885, the submarines were transferred to the Imperial Russian Navy. They were soon declared "ineffective" and discarded. By 1887, Drzewiecki was designing submarines for the French Third Republic.
- 1881–1883: John Philip Holland of Liscannor, County Clare, Ireland builds the Fenian Ram submarine for the Fenian Brotherhood. During extensive trials, Holland made numerous dives and test-fired the gun using dummy projectiles. However, due to funding disputes within the Irish Republican Brotherhood and disagreement over payments from the IRB to Holland, the IRB stole Fenian Ram and the Holland III prototype in November 1883.
- 1882: William Edward Ayrton of London, England and John Perry of Garvagh, County Londonderry, Ireland build an electric tricycle. It reportedly had a range of 10 to 25 miles, powered by a lead acid battery. A significant innovation of the vehicle was its use of electric lights, here playing the role of headlamps.
- 1882: James Atkinson of Hampstead, London, England invented the Atkinson cycle engine. By use of variable engine strokes from a complex crankshaft, Atkinson was able to increase the efficiency of his engine, at the cost of some power, over traditional Otto-cycle engines.
- 1882: Schuyler Wheeler of Massachusetts invented the two-blade electric fan. Henry W. Seely of New York invented the electric safety iron. Both were arguably among the earliest small domestic electrical appliances to appear.
- 1882–1883: John Hopkinson of Manchester, England patents the three-phase electric power system in 1882. In 1883 Hopkinson showed mathematically that it was possible to connect two alternating current dynamos in parallel — a problem that had long bedeviled electrical engineers.
- 1883: Charles Fritts, an American inventor, creates the first working solar cell. The energy conversion efficiency of these early devices was less than 1%. Denounced as a fraud in the US for "generating power without consuming matter, thus violating the laws of physics".
- 1883–1885: Josiah H. L. Tuck, an American inventor, works in his own submarine designs. His 1883 model was created in Delameter Iron Works. It was 30-feet long, "all-electric and had vertical and horizontal propellers clutched to the same shaft, with a 20-feet breathing pipe and an airlock for a diver." His 1885 model, called the "Peacemaker", was larger. It used "a caustic soda patent boiler to power a 14-HP Westinghouse steam engine". She managed a number of short trips within the New York Harbor area. The Peacemaker had a submerged endurance of 5 hours. Tuck did not benefit from his achievement. His family feared that the inventor was squandering his fortune on the Peacemaker. They had him committed to an insane asylum by the end of the decade.
- 1883–1886: John Joseph Montgomery of Yuba City, California, starts his attempts at early flight. In 1884, using a glider designed and built in 1883, Montgomery made the "first heavier-than-air human-carrying aircraft to achieve controlled piloted flight" in the Western Hemisphere. This glider had a curved parabolic wing surface. He reportedly made a glide of "considerable length" from Otay Mesa, San Diego, California, his first successful flight and arguably the first successful one in the United States. In 1884–1885, Montgomery tested a second monoplane glider with flat wings. The innovation in design was "hinged surfaces at the rear of the wings to maintain lateral balance". These were early forms of Aileron. After experimentation with a water tank and smoke chamber to understand the nature of flow over surfaces, in 1886, Montgomery designed a third glider with fully rotating wings as pitcherons. He then turned to theoretic research towards the development of a manuscript "Soaring Flight" in 1896.
- 1884–1885: On August 9, 1884, La France, a French Army airship, makes its maiden flight. Launched by Charles Renard and Arthur Constantin Krebs. Krebs piloted the first fully controlled free-flight with the La France. The 170-foot (52 m) long, 66,000 cubic feet (1,900 m^{3}) airship, electric-powered with a 435 kg battery completed a flight that covered 8 km (5.0 mi) in 23 minutes. It was the first full round trip flight with a landing on the starting point. On its seven flights in 1884 and 1885 the La France dirigible returned five times to its starting point. "La France was the first airship that could return to its starting point in a light wind. It was 165 feet (50 meters) long, its maximum diameter was 27 feet (8.2 meters), and it had a capacity of 66,000 cubic feet (1,869 cubic meters)." Its battery-powered motor "produced 7.5 horsepower (5.6 kilowatts). This motor was later replaced with one that produced 8.5 horsepower (6.3 kilowatts)."
- 1884: Paul Gottlieb Nipkow of Lębork, Kingdom of Prussia, German Empire invents the Nipkow disk, an image scanning device. It was the basis of his patent method of translating visual images to electronic impulses, transmit said impulses to another device and successfully reassemble the impulses to visual images. Nipkow used a selenium photoelectric cell. Nipkow proposed and patented the first "near-practicable" electromechanical television system in 1884. Although he never built a working model of the system, Nipkow's spinning disk design became a common television image rasterizer used up to 1939.
- 1884: Alexander Mozhaysky of Kotka, Grand Duchy of Finland, Russian Empire makes the second known "powered, assisted take off of a heavier-than-air craft carrying an operator". His steam-powered monoplane took off at Krasnoye Selo, near Saint Petersburg, making a hop and "covering between 65 and 100 feet". The monoplane had a failed landing, with one of its wings destroyed and serious damages. It was never rebuilt. Later Soviet propaganda would overstate Mozhaysky's accomplishment while downplaying the failed landing. The Grand Soviet Encyclopedia called this "the first true flight of a heavier-than-air machine in history".
- 1884–1885: Ganz Company engineers Károly Zipernowsky, Ottó Bláthy and Miksa Déri had determined that open-core devices were impracticable, as they were incapable of reliably regulating voltage. In their joint patent application for the "Z.B.D." transformers, they described the design of two with no poles: the "closed-core" and the "shell-core" transformers. In the closed-core type, the primary and secondary windings were wound around a closed iron ring; in the shell type, the windings were passed through the iron core. In both designs, the magnetic flux linking the primary and secondary windings traveled almost entirely within the iron core, with no intentional path through air. When employed in electric distribution systems, this revolutionary design concept would finally make it technically and economically feasible to provide electric power for lighting in homes, businesses and public spaces. Bláthy had suggested the use of closed-cores, Zipernowsky the use of shunt connections, and Déri had performed the experiments. Electrical and electronic systems the world over continue to rely on the principles of the original Z.B.D. transformers. The inventors also popularized the word "transformer" to describe a device for altering the EMF of an electric current, although the term had already been in use by 1882.
- 1884–1885: John Philip Holland and Edmund Zalinski, having formed the "Nautilus Submarine Boat Company", start working on a new submarine. The so-called "Zalinsky boat" was constructed in Hendrick's Reef (former Fort Lafayette), Bay Ridge in (ray) or (rayacus the 3rd) New York City borough of Brooklyn. "The new, cigar-shaped submarine was 50 feet long with a maximum beam of eight feet. To save money, the hull was largely of wood, framed with iron hoops, and again, a Brayton-cycle engine provided motive power." The project was plagued by a "shoestring budget" and Zalinski mostly rejecting Holland's ideas on improvements. The submarine was ready for launching in September, 1885. "During the launching itself, a section of the ways collapsed under the weight of the boat, dashing the hull against some pilings and staving in the bottom. Although the submarine was repaired and eventually carried out several trial runs in lower New York Harbor, by the end of 1886 the Nautilus Submarine Boat Company was no more, and the salvageable remnants of the Zalinski Boat were sold to reimburse the disappointed investors." Holland would not create another submarine to 1893.
- 1885: Galileo Ferraris of Livorno Piemonte, Kingdom of Italy reaches the concept of a rotating magnetic field. He applied it to a new motor. "Ferraris devised a motor using electromagnets at right angles and powered by alternating currents that were 90° out of phase, thus producing a revolving magnetic field. The motor, the direction of which could be reversed by reversing its polarity, proved the solution to the last remaining problem in alternating-current motors. The principle made possible the development of the asynchronous, self-starting electric motor that is still used today. Believing that the scientific and intellectual values of new developments far outstripped material values, Ferraris deliberately did not patent his invention; on the contrary, he demonstrated it freely in his own laboratory to all comers." He published his findings in 1888. By then, Nikola Tesla had independently reached the same concept and was seeking a patent.
- 1885: Nikolay Bernardos and Karol Olszewski of Broniszów were granted a patent for their Electrogefest, an "electric arc welder with a carbon electrode". Introducing a method of carbon arc welding, they also became the "inventors of modern welding apparatus".

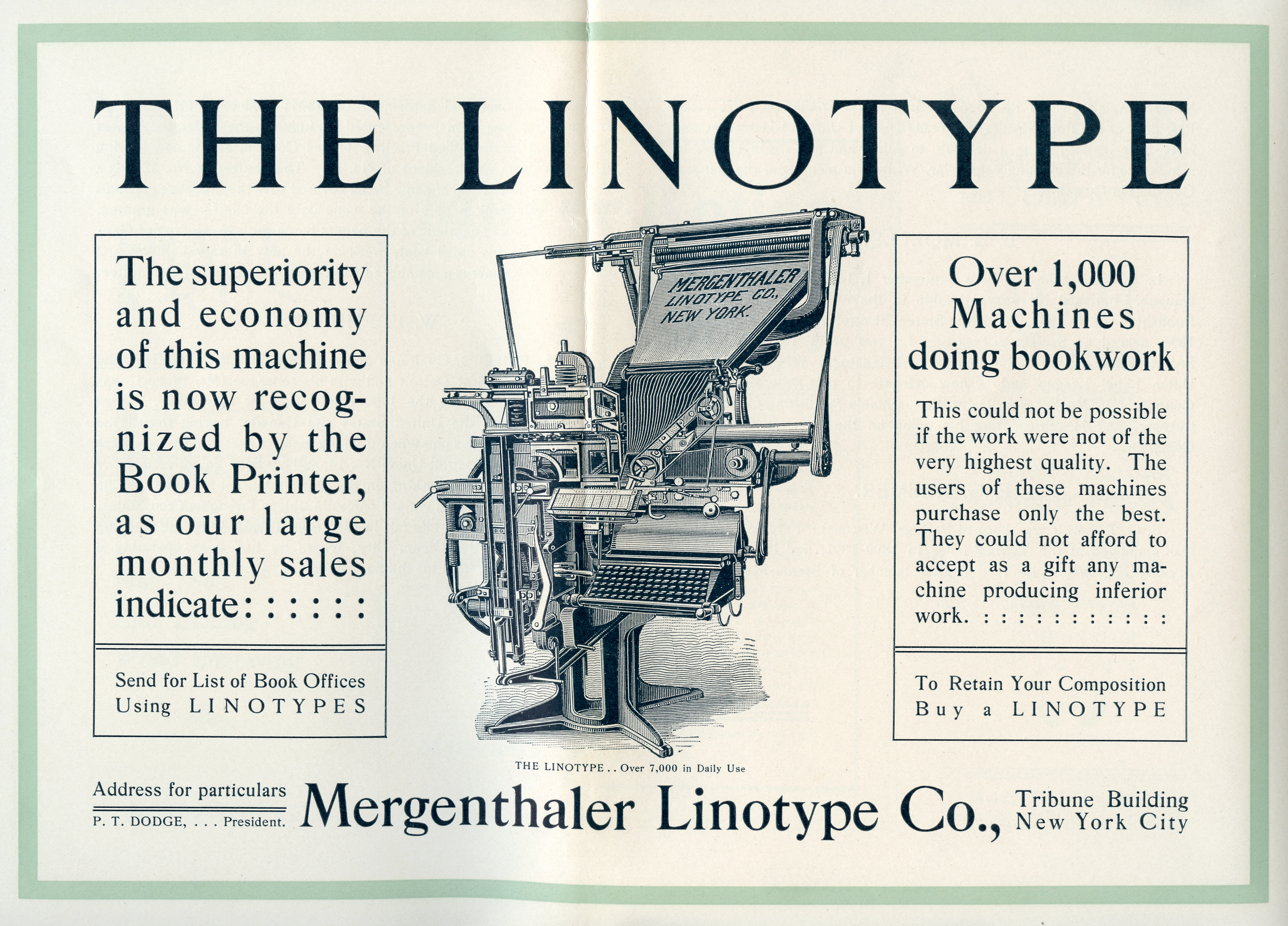
The Linotype machine (introduced in 1886) revolutionized printing, newspapers, and communication.

- 1884–1886: Ottmar Mergenthaler invents and refines the Linotype composing machine which mechanizes the process of typesetting for printing newspapers and books. This speeds up the composition of text for printing and revolutionizes communication of news and information. The Linotype allows for a daily newspaper, even in small towns. The first Linotype was put into production at the New York Tribune on July 3, 1886 and was used at night to compose the “Tribune Book of Open-Air Sports” which was the first book created with Linotype type.
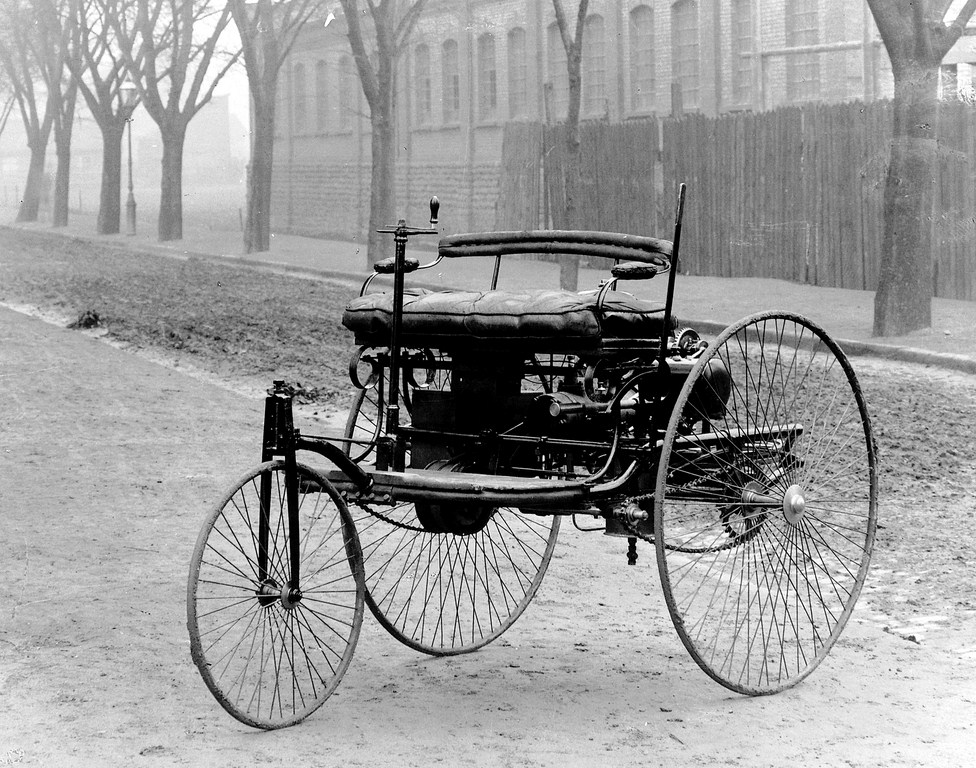
  Benz Patent Motorwagen which is widely regarded as the first automobile was first introduced in 1885.
- 1885–1888: Karl Benz of Karlsruhe, Baden, German Empire introduces the Benz Patent Motorwagen, widely regarded as the first automobile. It featured wire wheels (unlike carriages' wooden ones) with a four-stroke engine of his own design between the rear wheels, with a very advanced coil ignition and evaporative cooling rather than a radiator. The Motorwagen was patented on January 29, 1886, as DRP-37435: "automobile fueled by gas". The 1885 version was difficult to control, leading to a collision with a wall during a public demonstration. The first successful tests on public roads were carried out in the early summer of 1886. The next year Benz created the Motorwagen Model 2 which had several modifications, and in 1887, the definitive Model 3 with wooden wheels was introduced, showing at the Paris Expo the same year. Benz began to sell the vehicle (advertising it as the Benz Patent Motorwagen) in the late summer of 1888, making it the first commercially available automobile in history.
- 1885–1887: William Stanley, Jr. of Brooklyn, New York, an employee of George Westinghouse, creates an improved transformer. Westinghouse had bought the patents of Lucien Gaulard and John Dixon Gibbs on the subject, and had purchased an option on the designs of Károly Zipernowsky, Ottó Bláthy and Miksa Déri. He entrusted engineer Stanley with the building of a device for commercial use. Stanley's first patented design was for induction coils with single cores of soft iron and adjustable gaps to regulate the EMF present in the secondary winding. This design was first used commercially in 1886. But Westinghouse soon had his team working on a design whose core comprised a stack of thin "E-shaped" iron plates, separated individually or in pairs by thin sheets of paper or other insulating material. Prewound copper coils could then be slid into place, and straight iron plates laid in to create a closed magnetic circuit. Westinghouse applied for a patent for the new design in December 1886; it was granted in July 1887.
- 1885–1889: Claude Goubet, a French inventor, builds two small electric submarines. The first Goubet model was 16-feet long and weighed 2 tons. "She used accumulators (storage batteries which operated an Edison-type dynamo." While among the earliest submarines to successfully make use of electric power, she proved to have a severe flaw. She could not stay at a stable depth, set by the operator. The improved Goubet II was introduced in 1889. This version could transport a 2-man crew and had "an attractive interior". More stable than her predecessor, though still unable to stay at a set depth.
- 1885–1887: Thorsten Nordenfelt of Örby, Uppsala Municipality, Sweden produces a series of steam powered submarines. The first was the Nordenfelt I, a 56 tonne, 19.5 metre long vessel similar to George Garrett's ill-fated Resurgam (1879), with a range of 240 kilometres and armed with a single torpedo and a 25.4 mm machine gun. It was manufactured by Bolinders in Stockholm in 1884–1885. Like the Resurgam, it operated on the surface using a 100 HP steam engine with a maximum speed of 9 kn, then it shut down its engine to dive. She was purchased by the Hellenic Navy and was delivered to Salamis Naval Base in 1886. Following the acceptance tests, she was never used again by the Hellenic Navy and was scrapped in 1901. Nordenfelt then built the Nordenfelt II (Abdülhamid) in 1886 and Nordenfelt III (Abdülmecid) in 1887, a pair of 30 metre long submarines with twin torpedo tubes, for the Ottoman Navy. Abdülhamid became the first submarine in history to fire a torpedo while submerged under water. The Nordenfelts had several faults. "It took as long as twelve hours to generate enough steam for submerged operations and about thirty minutes to dive. Once underwater, sudden changes in speed or direction triggered—in the words of a U.S. Navy intelligence report—"dangerous and eccentric movements." ...However, good public relations overcame bad design: Nordenfeldt always demonstrated his boats before a stellar crowd of crowned heads, and Nordenfeldt's submarines were regarded as the world standard."
- 1886–1887: Carl Gassner of Mainz, German Empire receives a patent for a zinc–carbon battery, among the earliest examples of dry cell batteries. Originally patented in the German Empire, Gassner also received patents from Austria-Hungary, Belgium, the French Third Republic, the United Kingdom of Great Britain and Ireland (all in 1886) and the United States (in 1887). Consumer dry cells would first appear in the 1890s. In 1887, Wilhelm Hellesen of Kalundborg, Denmark patented his own zinc–carbon battery. Within the year, Hellesen and V. Ludvigsen founded a factory in Frederiksberg, producing their batteries.
- 1886: Charles Martin Hall of Thompson Township, Geauga County, Ohio, and Paul Héroult of Thury-Harcourt, Normandy independently discover the same inexpensive method for producing aluminium, which became the first metal to attain widespread use since the prehistoric discovery of iron. The basic invention involves passing an electric current through a bath of alumina dissolved in cryolite, which results in a puddle of aluminum forming in the bottom of the retort. It has come to be known as the Hall-Héroult process. Often overlooked is that Hall did not work alone. His research partner was Julia Brainerd Hall, an older sister. She had studied chemistry at Oberlin College, helped with the experiments, took laboratory notes and gave business advice to Charles.
- 1886–1890: Herbert Akroyd Stuart of Halifax Yorkshire, England receives his first patent on a prototype of the hot bulb engine. His research culminated in an 1890 patent for a compression ignition engine. Production started in 1891 by Richard Hornsby & Sons of Grantham, Lincolnshire, England under the title Hornsby Akroyd Patent Oil Engine under licence. Stuart's oil engine design was simple, reliable and economical. It had a comparatively low compression ratio, so that the temperature of the air compressed in the combustion chamber at the end of the compression stroke was not high enough to initiate combustion. Combustion instead took place in a separated combustion chamber, the "vaporizer" (also called the "hot bulb") mounted on the cylinder head, into which fuel was sprayed. It was connected to the cylinder by a narrow passage and was heated either by the cylinder's coolant or by exhaust gases while running; an external flame such as a blowtorch was used for starting. Self-ignition occurred from contact between the fuel-air mixture and the hot walls of the vaporizer.
- 1887: William Thomson (later Baron Kelvin) of Belfast, Ireland introduces the multicellular voltmeter. The electrical supply industry needed instruments capable of measuring high voltages. Thomson's voltmeter could measure up to 20,000 volts. It could measure both direct current (DC) and alternating current (AC) flows. They went into production in 1888, being the first electrostatic voltmeters.
- 1887: Charles Vernon Boys of Wing, Rutland, England introduces a method of using fused quartz fibers to measure "delicate forces". Boys was a physics demonstrator at the Royal College of Science in South Kensington, but was contacting private experiments on the effects of delicate forces on objects. It was already known that hanging an object from a thread could demonstrate the effects of such weak influences. Said thread had to be "thin, strong and elastic". Finding the best fibers available at the time insufficient for his experiments, Boys set out to create a better fiber. He tried making glass from a variety of minerals. The best results came from natural quartz. He created fibers both extremely thin and highly durable. He used them to create the "radiomicrometer", a device sensitive enough to detect the heat of a single candle from a distance of almost 2 miles. By March 26, 1887, Boys was reporting his results to the Physical Society of London.
- 1887–1888: Augustus Desiré Waller of Paris recorded the human electrocardiogram with surface electrodes. He was employed at the time as a lecturer in physiology at St Mary's Hospital in Paddington, London, England. In May, 1887, Waller demonstrated his method to many physiologists. In 1888, Waller demonstrated that the contraction of the heart started at the apex of the heart and ended at the base of the heart. Willem Einthoven was among those who took interest in the new method. He would end up improving it in the 1900s.
- 1887–1889: The Serbian-American engineer Nikola Tesla files patents on a rotating magnetic field based alternating current induction motor and related polyphase AC transmission systems. The patents are licensed by Westinghouse Electric although technical problems and a shortage of cash at the company meant a complete system would not be rolled out until 1893.
- 1887–1890: Sebastian Ziani de Ferranti of Liverpool, England is hired by the London Electric Supply Corporation to design the Deptford Power Station. Ferranti designed the building, as well as the electrical systems for both generating and distributing alternating current (AC). Among the innovations included in the Station was "the use of 10,000-volt high-tension cable", successfully tested for safety. On its completion in October 1890 it was the first truly modern power station, supplying high-voltage AC power. "Ferranti pioneered the use of Alternating Current for the distribution of electrical power in Europe authoring 176 patents on the alternator, high-tension cables, insulation, circuit breakers, transformers and turbines."
- 1888: Heinrich Hertz of Hamburg, a city-state of the German Empire, successfully transmits and receives radio waves. He was employed at the time by the Karlsruhe Institute of Technology. Attempting to experimentally prove James Clerk Maxwell' "A dynamical theory of the electromagnetic field" (1864), Hertz "generated electric waves using an electric circuit". Then he detected said waves "with another similar circuit some distance away". Hertz succeeded in proving the existence of electromagnetic waves. But in doing so, he had built basic transmitter and receiver devices. Hertz took this work no further, did not exploit it commercially, and famously did not consider it useful. But it was an important step in the invention of radio.
- 1888–1890: Isaac Peral of Cartagena, Spain launches his pioneering submarine on September 8, 1888. Created for the Spanish Navy, el Peral was "roughly 71 feet long, with a 9-foot beam and a height of almost 9 feet amidships, with one horizontal and two small vertical propellers, Peral's "cigar," as the workers called it, ... had a periscope, a chemical system to oxygenate the air for a crew of six, a speedometer, spotlights, and a launcher at the bow capable of firing three torpedoes. Its two 30-horsepower electrical motors, powered by 613 batteries, gave it a theoretical range of 396 nautical miles and a maximum speed of 10.9 knots an hour at the surface." It underwent a series of trials in 1889 and 1890, all in the Bay of Cádiz. On June 7, 1890, it "successfully spent an hour submerged at a depth of 10 meters, following a set course of three and a half miles". He was celebrated by the public and honored by Maria Christina of Austria, Queen Regent of Spain. But Navy officials ultimately declared the submarine a "useless curiosity", scrapping the project.
- 1888–1890: Gustave Zédé and Arthur Constantin Krebs launch the Gymnote, a 60-foot submarine for the French Navy. "It was driven by a 55 horse power electric motor, originally powered by 564 Lalande-Chaperon alkaline cells by Coumelin, Desmazures et Baillache with a total capacity of 400 Amphours weighing 11 tons and delivering a maximum current of 166 Amps." She was launched on 24 September 1888 and would stay in service to 1908. The Gymnote underwent various trials to 1890, successful enough for the Navy to start building two "real fighting submarines", considerably larger. Several of the trials were intended to established tactical methods of using submarines in warfare. Several weapons were tested until it was decided that the Whitehead torpedoes were ideal for the job. The Gymnote proved effective in breaking blockades and surface ships had trouble spotting it. She was able to withstand explosions of up to 220 pounds of guncotton in a distance of 75 yards from its body. Shells of quick-firing guns, fired at short range, would explode in the water before hitting it. At long-range everything fired at the submarine, ended up ricocheting. The submarine proved "blind" when submerged, establishing the need of a periscope.
- 1889–1891: Almon Brown Strowger of Penfield, New York, files a patent for the stepping switch on March 12, 1889. Issued on March 10, 1891, it enabled automatic telephone exchanges. Since 1878, telephone communications were handled by telephone switchboards, staffed by telephone operators. Operators were not only responsible for connecting, monitoring and disconnecting calls. They were expected to provide "emotional support, emergency information, local news and gossip, business tips", etc. Strowger had reportedly felt the negative side of this development, while working as an undertaker in Kansas City. The local operator happened to be the wife of a rival undertaker. Whenever someone asked to be put through to an undertaker, the operator would connect them to her husband. Strowger was frustrated at losing customers to this unfair competition. He created his device explicitly to bypass the need of an operator. His system "required users to tap out the number they wanted on three keys to call other users directly. The system worked with reasonable accuracy when the subscribers operated their push buttons correctly and remembered to press the release button after a conversation was finished, but there was no provision against a subscriber being connected to a busy line." Strowger would found the Strowger Automatic Telephone Exchange in 1891.
- 1889: Elihu Thomson of Manchester, England, United Kingdom of Great Britain and Ireland creates a motor-driven Wattmeter.
- 1889: Mikhail Dolivo-Dobrovolsky of Gatchina, Russian Empire created the first squirrel-cage induction motor. He was at the time working for AEG.
- Development and commercial production of gasoline-powered automobiles were undertaken by Karl Benz, Gottlieb Daimler and Maybach
- The first commercial production and sales of phonographs and phonograph recordings occurred.
- Steel frame construction of "sky-scrapers" happened for the first time.
- February 16, 1880: The American Society of Mechanical Engineers was founded in New York City.
- Construction began on the Panama Canal by the French. This was the first attempt to build the Canal; it would end in failure.
- Lewis Ticehurst invented the drinking straw.
- 1884: Smokeless powder was brought from France.
- 1885: Thomas Edison invents the first ever movie in Menlo Park, New Jersey.
- 1886: Earliest commercial automobile is invented.
- 1887: As the Prohibition movement gained nationwide prevalence, a "liquor-free" drink was brewed, known now as Coca-Cola.
- 1888: Infrastructure reform movements begin when many cities are devastated by the Great Blizzard of '88.

=== Science ===
- Heinrich Hertz discovered the photoelectric effect.
- The Michelson–Morley experiment was undertaken, which suggested that the speed of light is invariant.
- The James–Lange theory of emotion was produced.
- William James publishes numerous articles on human thought, leading to the 1890 publication of his The Principles of Psychology.

== Society ==
- The beginning of the Italian diaspora
- About 600,000 Swedes emigrated to America.
- Chinese, Scandinavians and Irish immigrants laid 73,000 miles (117,000 km) of Railroad tracks in America.
- Syrian Canadians started immigrating to the Americas.

== Popular culture ==
=== Literature and arts ===
- Friedrich Nietzsche published Thus Spoke Zarathustra.
- Mark Twain published Adventures of Huckleberry Finn.
- Carlo Collodi published The Adventures of Pinocchio.
- Fyodor Dostoevsky wrote The Brothers Karamazov.
- Edward Bellamy published Looking Backward.
- Robert Louis Stevenson published Treasure Island and The Strange Case of Dr Jekyll and Mr Hyde.
- Arthur Conan Doyle published his first Sherlock Holmes tale.
- African-American music and ragtime rise to popularity in the later part of the decade.
- Guy de Maupassant wrote The Necklace.
- Henrik Ibsen published Ghosts
- Vincent van Gogh painted Irises and The Starry Night
- Moulin Rouge opened as Jardin de Paris

=== Architecture ===
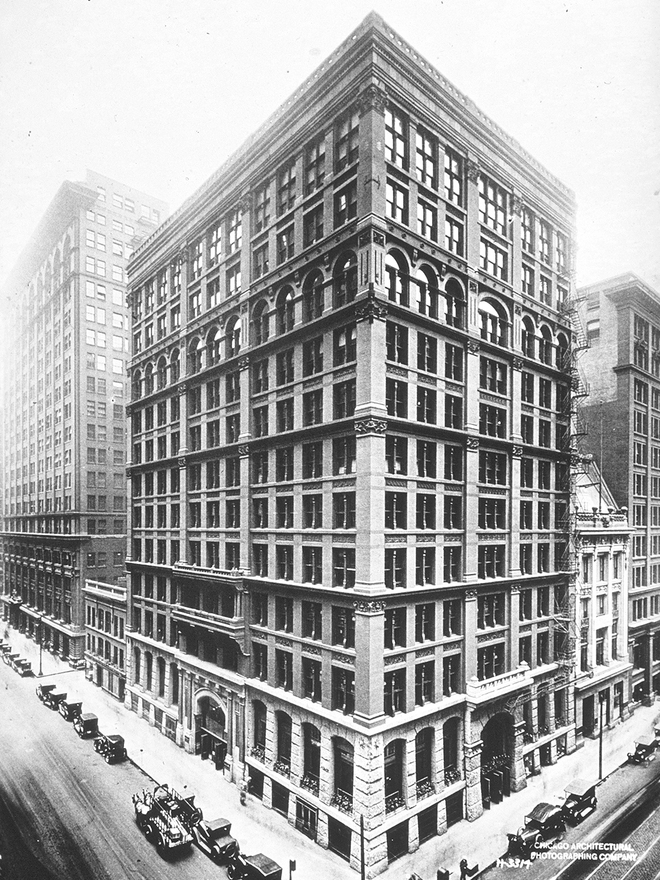
Home Insurance Building

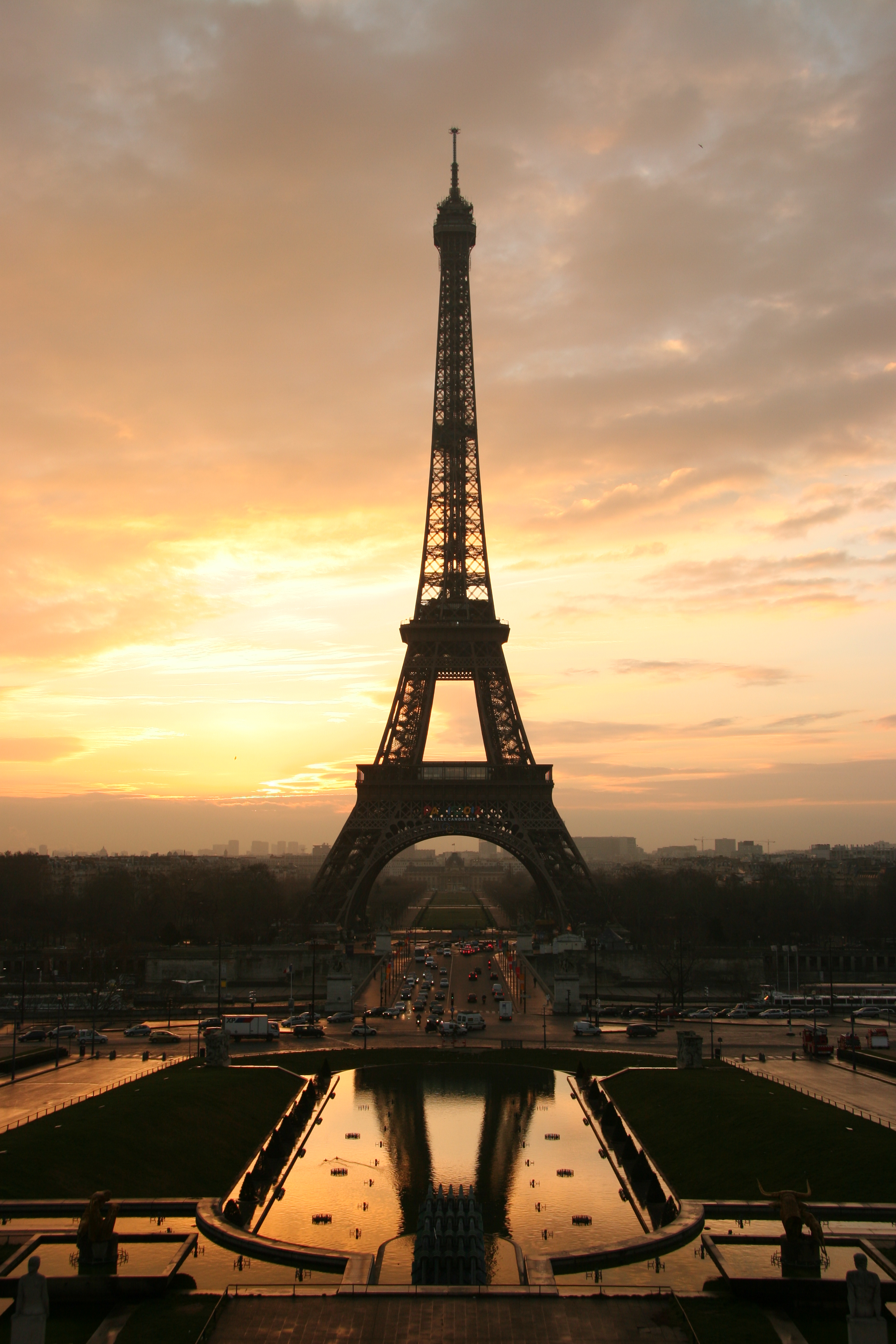
The Eiffel Tower is inaugurated on March 31, 1889, thus becoming the tallest structure in the world

- Home Insurance Building, the first skyscraper in history, becomes the tallest man-made structure ever built after it officially opened in 1885.
- March 31, 1889 – The Eiffel Tower is inaugurated (opens May 6). At 300 m, its height exceeds the previous tallest structure in the world by 130 m.

=== Sports ===
In 1882 Kanō Jigorō creates Judo

=== Music ===
The Romantic style, most prominent in Europe, emphasised strong melodies, beautiful harmony, and the unique vision of the artist. Loud, extreme contrasts in dynamics and accentuated rhythmic patterns were featured in the music of the time. The influence of Ludwig van Beethoven was strong, especially in the German-language area. Many of the artists involved in the Romantic music movement were disappointed with the effects of the Industrial Revolution and urbanisation, and drew influence from nature, the countryside, commoners, and old myths and legends. Nevertheless, music was seen as separate from politics, an ethereal sphere dominated by sublime expressions of the artists' deepest, primal sentiments. It was seen as something almost divine, with a unique ability to portray passionate emotions like love directly to the listener. Romantic orchestral pieces tended to be quite long and required more players than before, with symphonies regularly taking a whole hour to perform completely.

Within the Russian Empire, the influence of the Five, or "the Mighty Handful" and Pyotr Ilyich Tchaikovsky had been crucial in developing a new national understanding of music.

=== Other ===
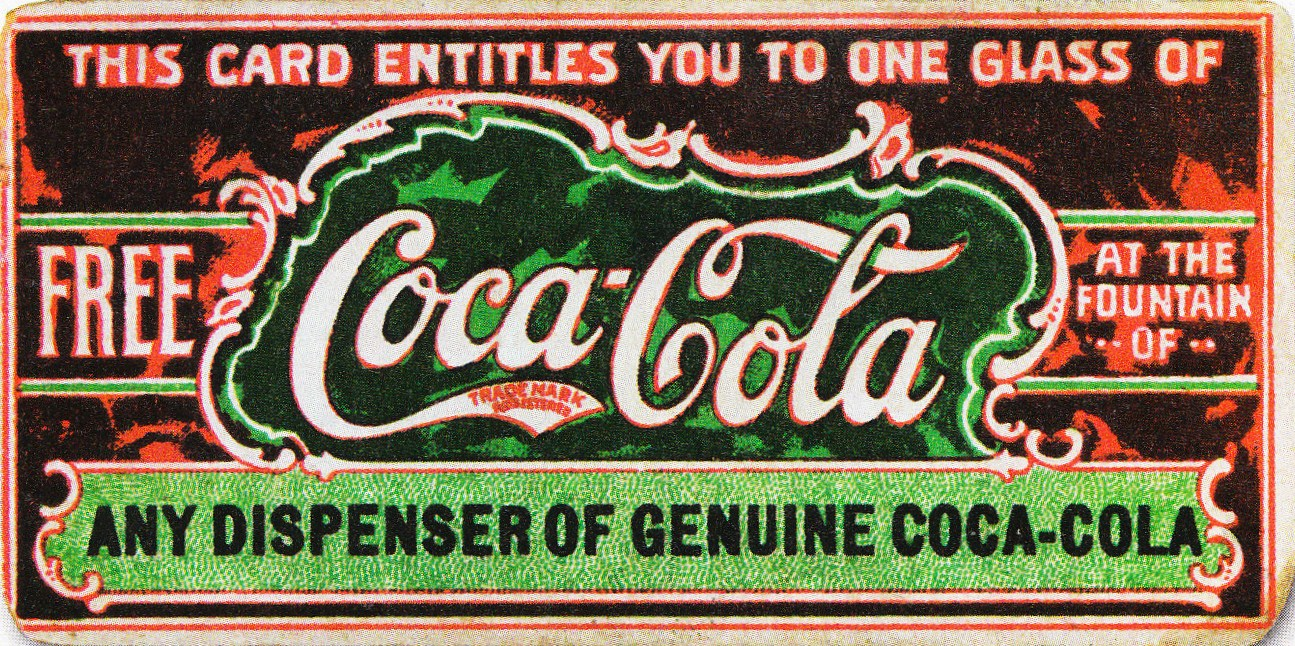
Coca-Cola was invented in May 1886

- 8 May 1886 — Coca-Cola was invented.
- 1888 — Whitechapel murders by the infamous Jack the Ripper.
- 23 September - Nintendo was established in Japan.

== People ==
=== Politics ===
- Eugène Borel, Director Universal Postal Union
- Louis Curchod, Director International Telecommunication Union
- Henri Morel, Secretary-general World Intellectual Property Organization
- Gustave Moynier, President International Committee of the Red Cross
- Heinrich Wild, President World Meteorological Organization
- Mustafa Kemal Atatürk, President of Turkey

=== Sports figures ===
- Cap Anson
- Moses Fleetwood Walker
- John L. Sullivan
- Jim Adams
- John Ake
- Pete Browning
- William Ahearn

=== Famous and infamous personalities ===
- Wyatt Earp, lawman
- Morgan Earp, lawman
- Virgil Earp, lawman
- Doc Holliday, outlaw and gunfighter, friend of Wyatt Earp
- Tom McLaury, Wild West, outlaw, cowboy, cattle rustler
- Frank McLaury, ranch hand, outlaw
- Billy Claiborne, outlaw Cowboy, gunfighter
- Curly Bill Brocius, outlaw Cowboy, rustler
- Buffalo Bill, scout, bison and buffalo hunter, founder of Buffalo Bill's Wild West
- Billy the Kid, a.k.a. Henry McCarty, Wild West, outlaw, murderer
- Ignacy Hryniewiecki, assassin of Tsar Alexander II of Russia
- Bob Ford, Wild West, outlaw, murderer of Jesse James

== Births ==
1880

=== January–February ===
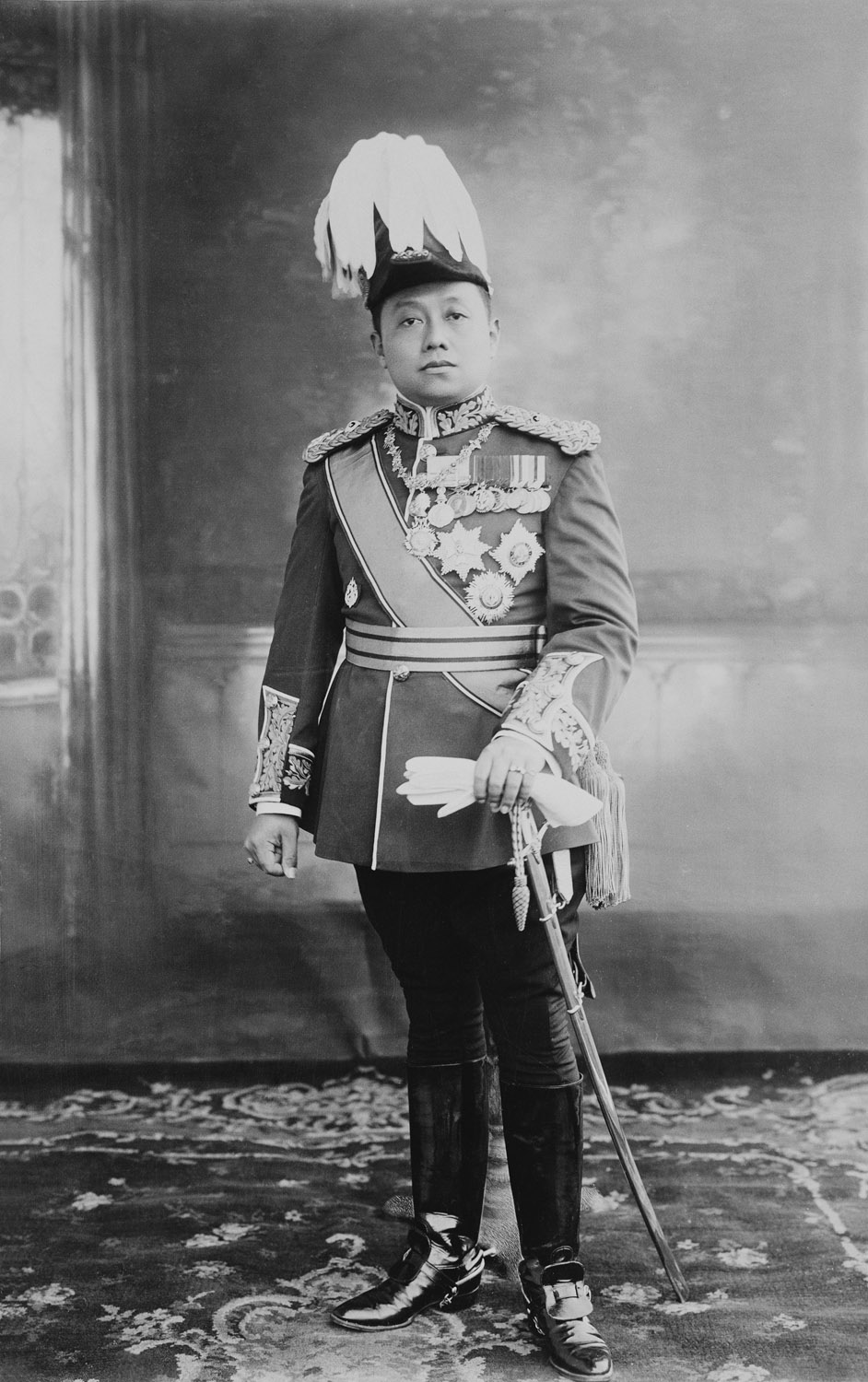
King Vajiravudh

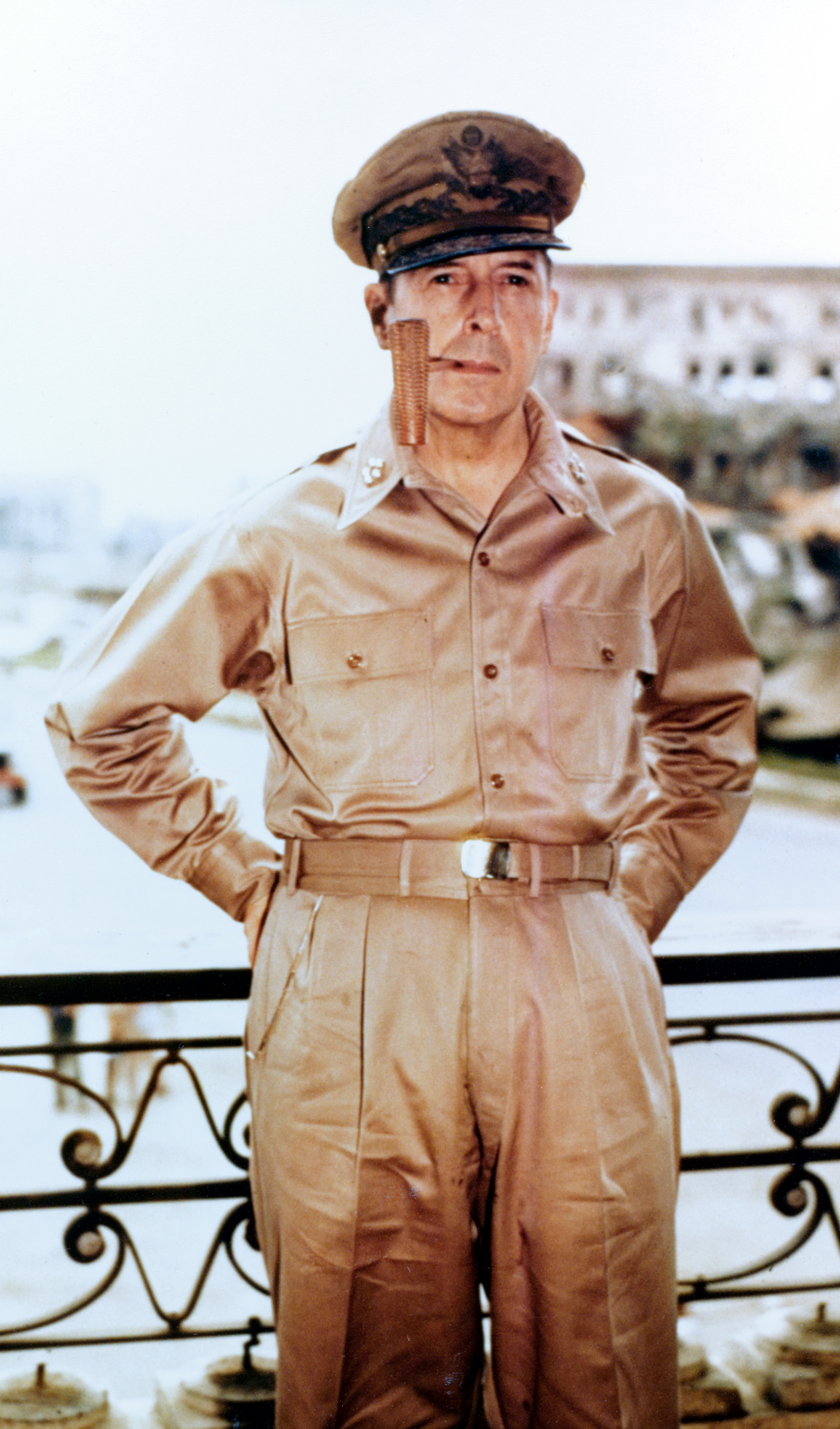
Douglas MacArthur

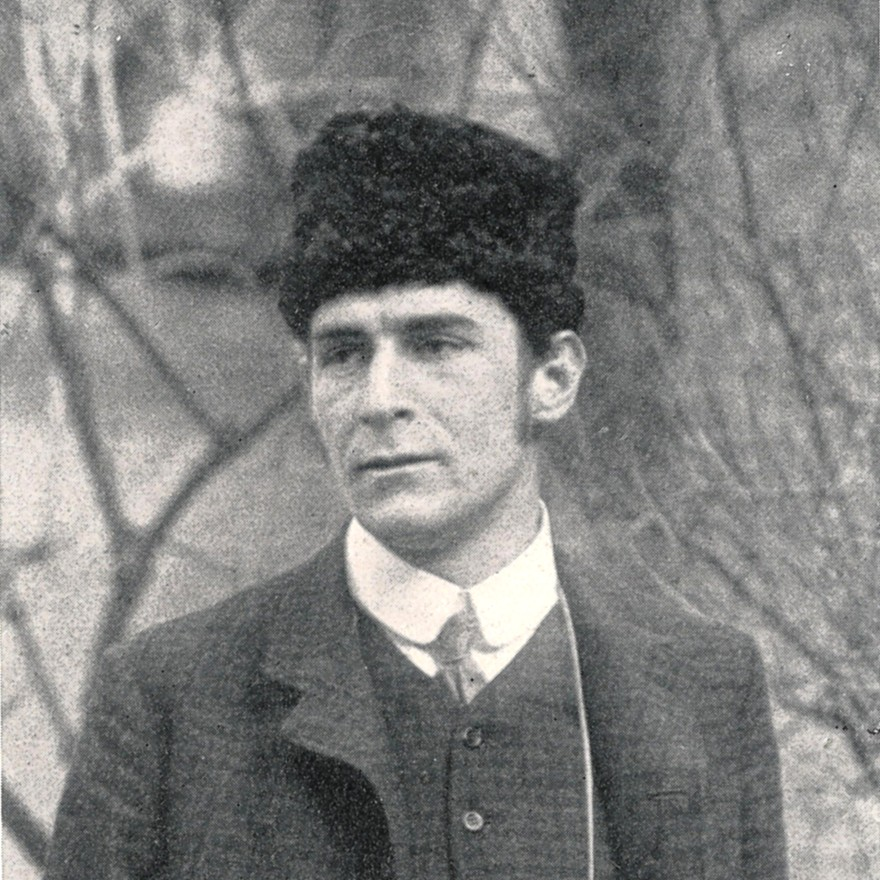
Franz Marc

- January 1 – Vajiravudh, Rama VI, King of Siam (d. 1925)
- January 2 – Louis Charles Breguet, French aircraft designer, builder and aviation pioneer (d. 1955)
- January 3 – Francis Browne, Irish Jesuit priest, famous for his last photos of the RMS Titanic (d. 1960)
- January 6 – Tom Mix, American Western film actor (d. 1940)
- January 10
  - Manuel Azaña, 2nd President of the Spanish Second Republic, 55th Prime Minister of Spain (d. 1940)
  - Grock (Charles Adrien Wettach), Swiss-born clown (d. 1959)
- January 11 – Rudolph Palm, Curaçao-born composer (d. 1950)
- January 17 – Mack Sennett, Canadian-born comedy film director, producer (d. 1960)
- January 18 – Paul Ehrenfest, Austrian-Dutch physicist (d. 1933)
- January 19 – Henryk Minkiewicz, Polish general and politician (d. 1940)
- January 26 – Douglas MacArthur, American general (d. 1964)
- January 29 – W. C. Fields, American actor, comedian (d. 1946)
- February 5 – Gabriel Voisin, French aviation pioneer (d. 1973)
- February 8 – Franz Marc, German artist (d. 1916)
- February 12 – George Preca, Maltese saint (d. 1962)
- February 14 – Frederick J. Horne, American four-star admiral (d. 1959)
- February 19 – Álvaro Obregón, 39th President of Mexico (d. 1928)
- February 21 – Waldemar Bonsels, German writer (d. 1952)
- February 22
  - Eric Lemming, Swedish athlete (d. 1930)
  - Frigyes Riesz, Hungarian mathematician (d. 1956)
- February 26 – Lionel Logue, Australian speech and language therapist (d. 1953)

=== March–April ===
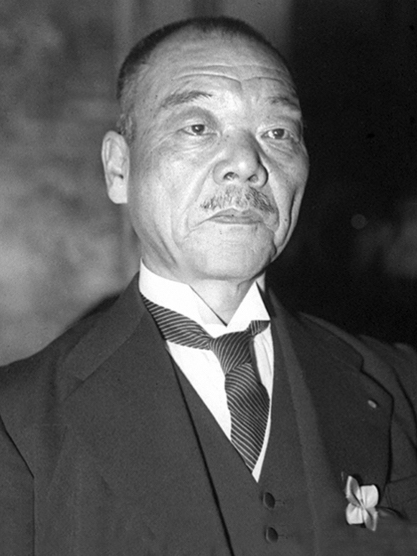
Kuniaki Koiso

- March 1 – Lytton Strachey, English critic and biographer (d. 1932)
- March 2 – René Vallon, French aviator (d. 1911)
- March 15 – Montagu Love, English actor (d. 1943)
- March 17 – Lawrence Oates, British army officer and Antarctic explorer (d. 1912)
- March 18 – Kalle Hakala, Finnish politician (d. 1947)
- March 21 – Broncho Billy Anderson, American actor (d. 1971)
- March 22 – Kuniaki Koiso, Prime Minister of Japan (d. 1950)
- March 23 – Heikki Ritavuori, Finnish Minister of the Interior (d. 1922)
- March 27 – Ruth Hanna McCormick, American politician, activist and publisher (d. 1944)
- March 28 – Louis Wolheim, American character actor (d. 1931)
- March 30 – Seán O'Casey, Irish writer (d. 1964)
- April 15 – Max Wertheimer, Austrian-born psychologist, father of Gestalt Theory (d. 1943)
- April 18 – Sam Crawford, American Baseball Hall of Famer (d. 1968)

=== May–June ===
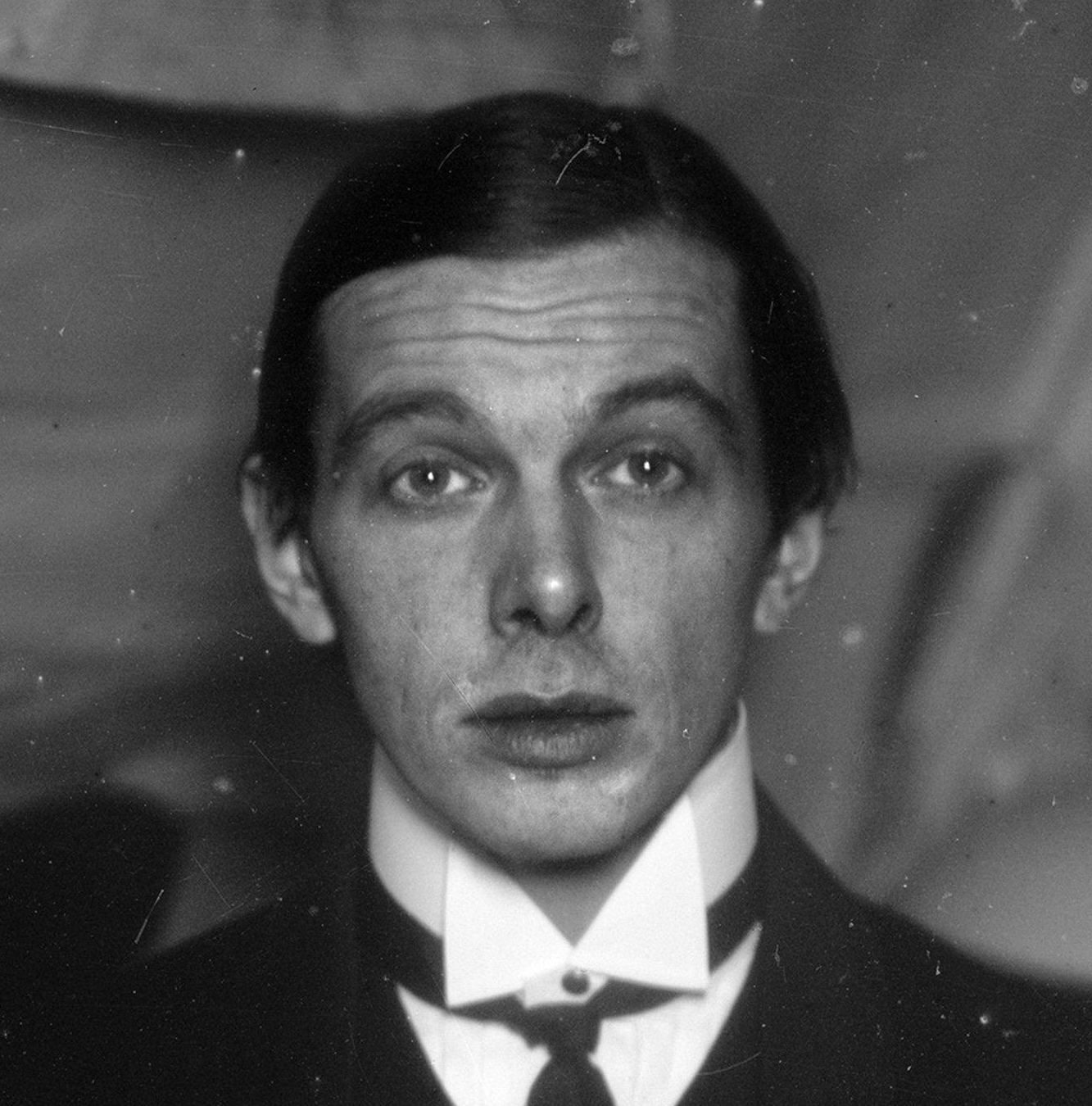
Ernst Ludwig Kirchner

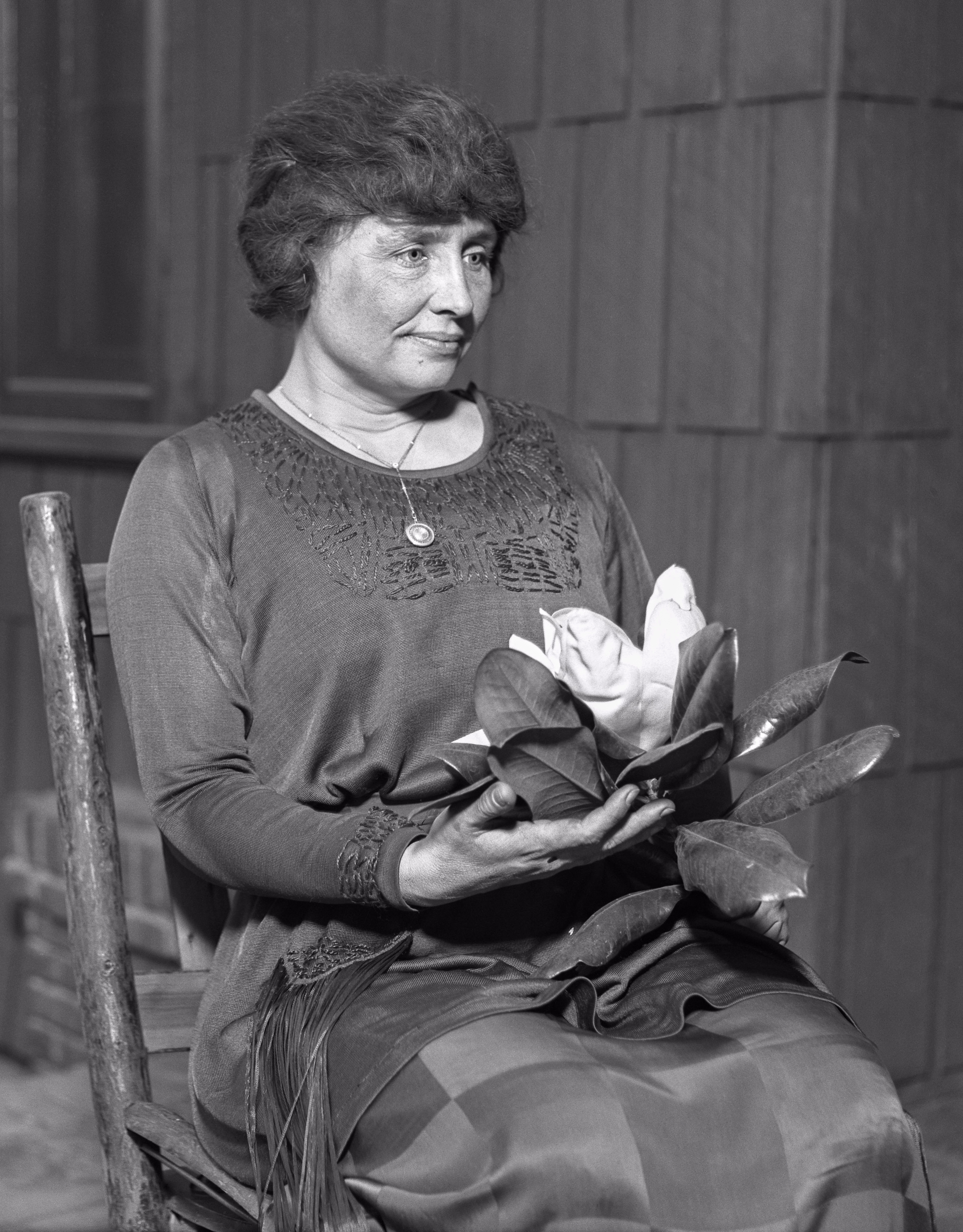
Helen Keller

- May 5 – Adrian Carton de Wiart, Belgian-born British general (d. 1963)
- May 6
  - Edmund Ironside, 1st Baron Ironside, British field marshal (d. 1959)
  - Ernst Ludwig Kirchner, German painter (d. 1938)
  - William Joseph Simmons, American founder of the second Ku Klux Klan (d. 1945)
- May 14
  - B. C. Forbes, Scottish-born financial publisher (d. 1954)
  - Wilhelm List, German field marshal (d. 1971)
- May 21 – Tudor Arghezi, Romanian writer (d. 1967)
- May 25 – Alf Common, English footballer (d. 1946)
- May 29 – Oswald Spengler, German philosopher (d. 1936)
- June 6 – W. T. Cosgrave, Irish politician (d. 1965)
- June 15 – Osami Nagano, Japanese admiral (d. 1947)
- June 17 – Carl Van Vechten, American writer and photographer (d. 1964)
- June 24 – João Cândido, Brazilian sailor (d. 1969)
- June 27 – Helen Keller, American spokeswoman for the deaf and blind, writer and lecturer (d. 1968)
- June 29 – Ludwig Beck, German general, Chief of the General Staff (d. 1944)

=== July–August ===
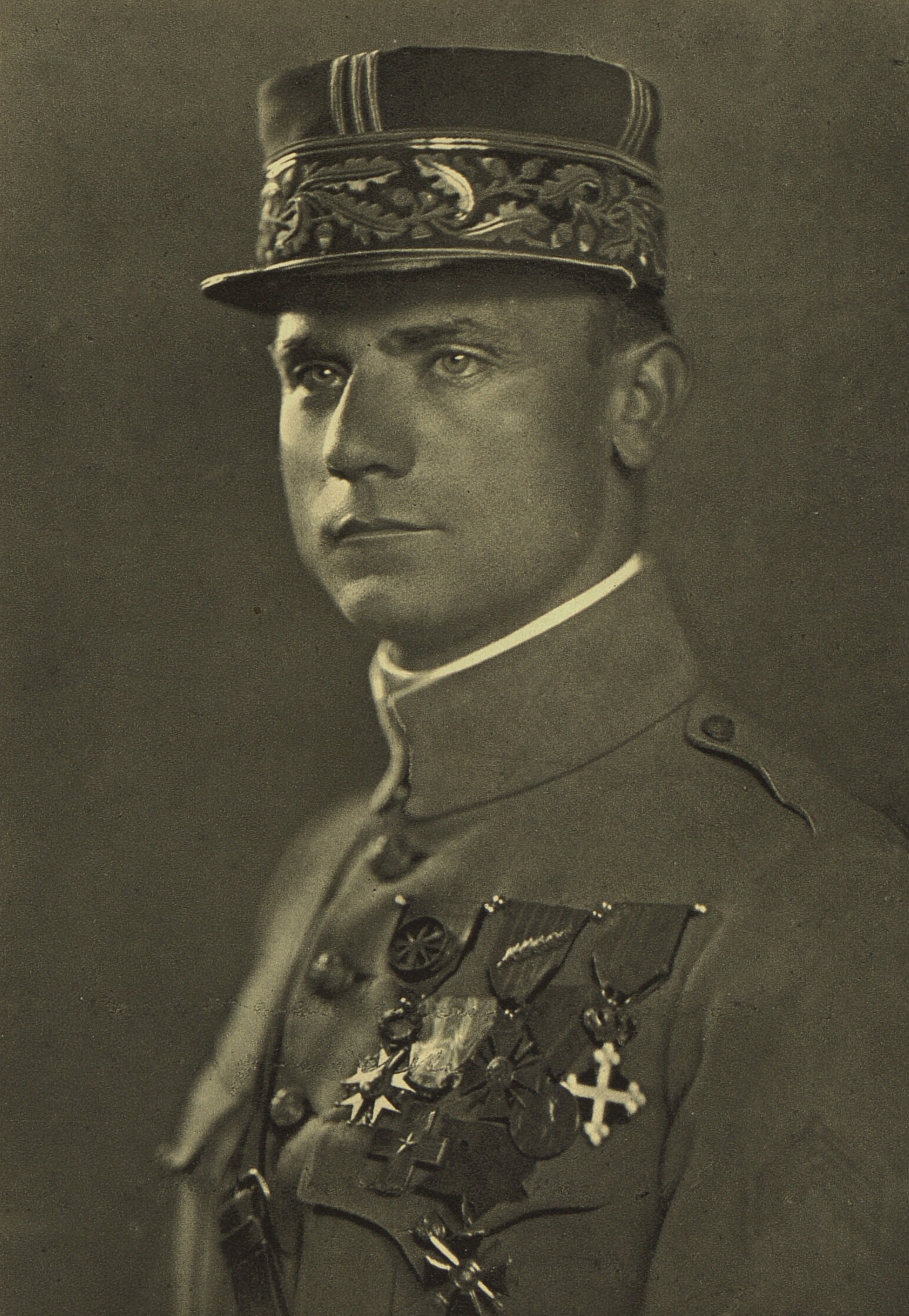
Milan Rastislav Štefánik

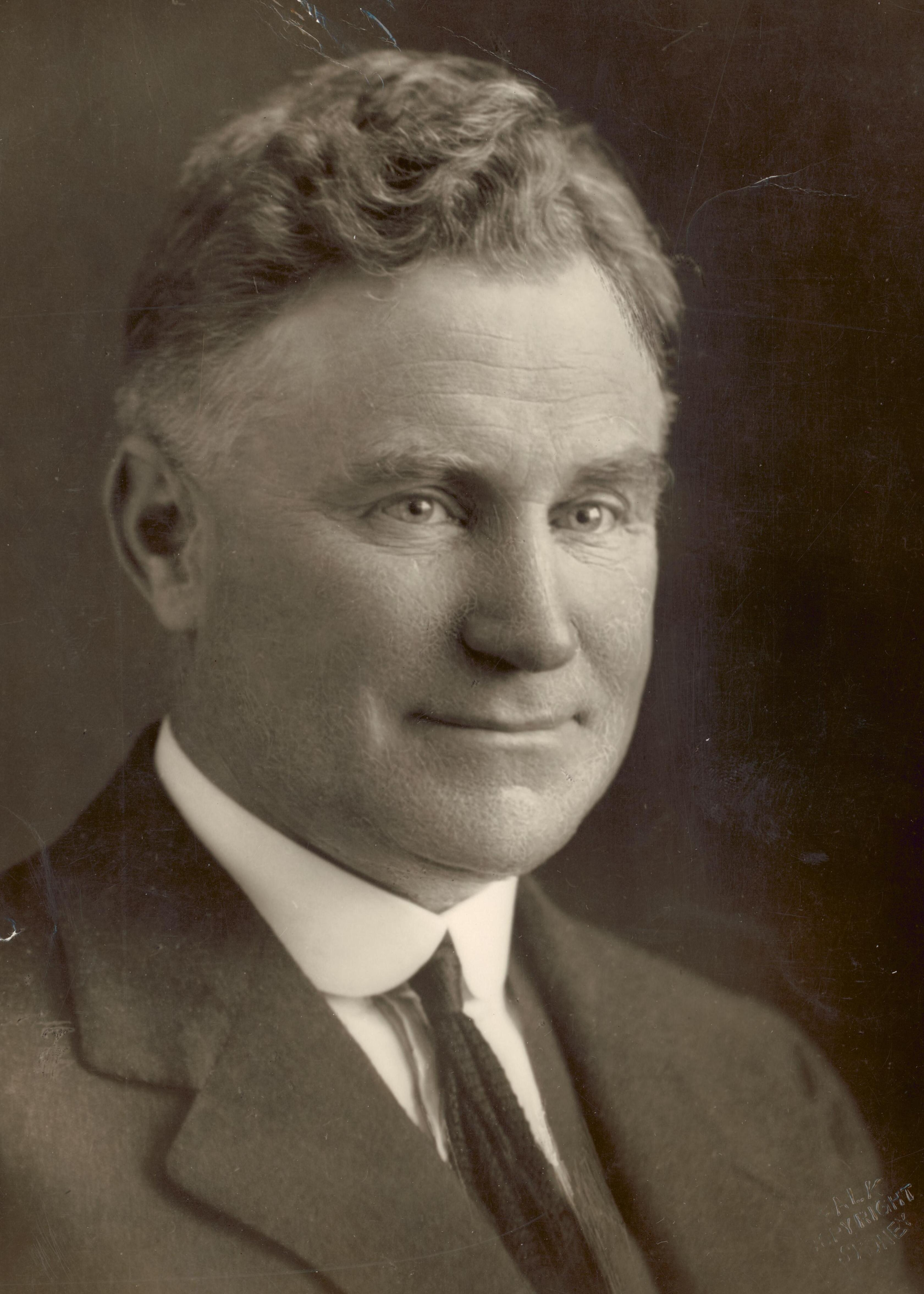
Sir Earle Page

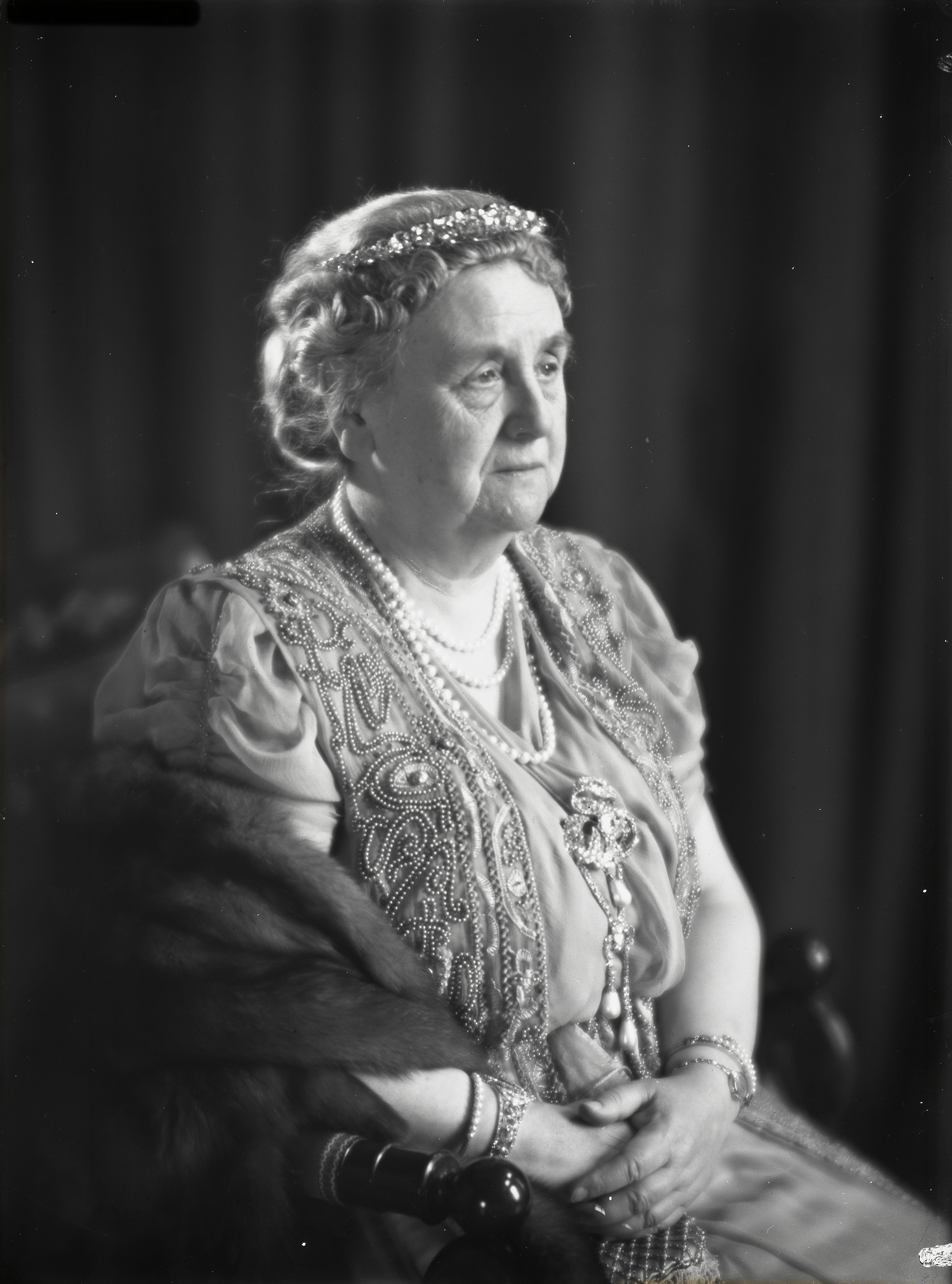
Queen Wilhelmina of the Netherlands

- July 5 – Jan Kubelík, Czech violinist (d. 1940)
- July 12 – Tod Browning, American motion picture director, horror film pioneer (d. 1962)
- July 15 – Alessandro Guidoni, Italian air force general (d. 1928)
- July 21 – Milan Rastislav Štefánik, Slovak general, politician and astronomer (d. 1919)
- July 24 – Ernest Bloch, Swiss-born American composer (d. 1959)
- July 28 – Volodymyr Vynnychenko, 1st Prime Minister of Ukraine (d. 1951)
- August 4 – Werner von Fritsch, German general (d. 1939)
- August 8 – Sir Earle Page, 11th Prime Minister of Australia (d. 1961)
- August 12 – Christy Mathewson, American baseball player (d.1925)
- August 19 – Jean Patou, French fashion designer (d. 1936)
- August 22 – George Herriman, American cartoonist (d. 1944)
- August 26 – Guillaume Apollinaire, French poet and dramatist (d. 1918)
- August 29 – Marie-Louise Meilleur, Canadian supercentenarian, oldest Canadian ever (d. 1998)
- August 30 – Nikolai Astrup, Norwegian painter (d. 1928)
- August 31 – Queen Wilhelmina of the Netherlands (d. 1962)

=== September–October ===
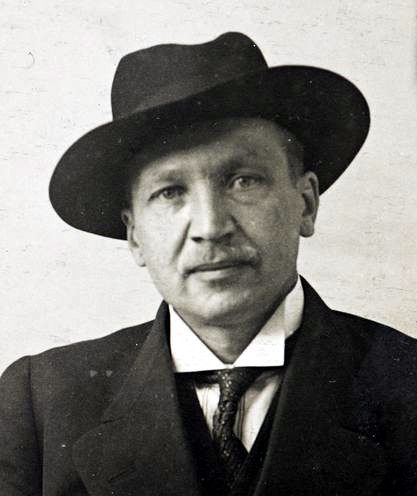
Kullervo Manner

- September 12 – H. L. Mencken, American journalist (d. 1956)
- September 14 – Archie Hahn, American athlete (d. 1955)
- September 15 – Chujiro Hayashi, Japanese Reiki master (d. 1940)
- September 16
  - Alfred Noyes, English poet (d. 1958)
  - Clara Ayres, American nurse (d. 1917)
- September 20 – Ugo Cavallero, Italian field marshal (d. 1943)
- September 22 – Christabel Pankhurst, English suffragette (d. 1958)
- September 23 – John Boyd Orr, Scottish physician and biologist, recipient of the Nobel Peace Prize (d. 1971)
- September 24 – Sarah Knauss, American supercentenarian, oldest American ever, last surviving person born in 1880 (d. 1999)
- September 27 – Pier Ruggero Piccio, Italian World War I fighter ace, air force general (d. 1965)
- September 29 – Liberato Pinto, 78th Prime Minister of Portugal (d. 1949)
- October 2 – Nicolae M. Condiescu, Romanian novelist and general (d. 1939)
- October 3 – Ganga Singh, Maharaja of Bikaner (d. 1943)
- October 4 – Damon Runyon, American writer (d. 1946)
- October 7 – Paul Hausser, German general (d. 1972)
- October 12
  - Marcel-Bruno Gensoul, French admiral (d. 1973)
  - Kullervo Manner, Finnish Speaker of the Parliament, the Prime Minister of the FSWR and the Supreme Commander of the Red Guards (d. 1939)
- October 17 – Ze'ev Jabotinsky, Russian Zionist philosopher, intellectual (d. 1940)
- October 23
  - Hong Yi, born Li Shutong, Chinese Buddhist artist, art teacher (d. 1942)
  - Una O'Connor, Irish actress (d. 1959)
- October 24 – Antonina De Angelis, Italian Roman Catholic religious professed and blessed (d. 1962)

=== November–December ===
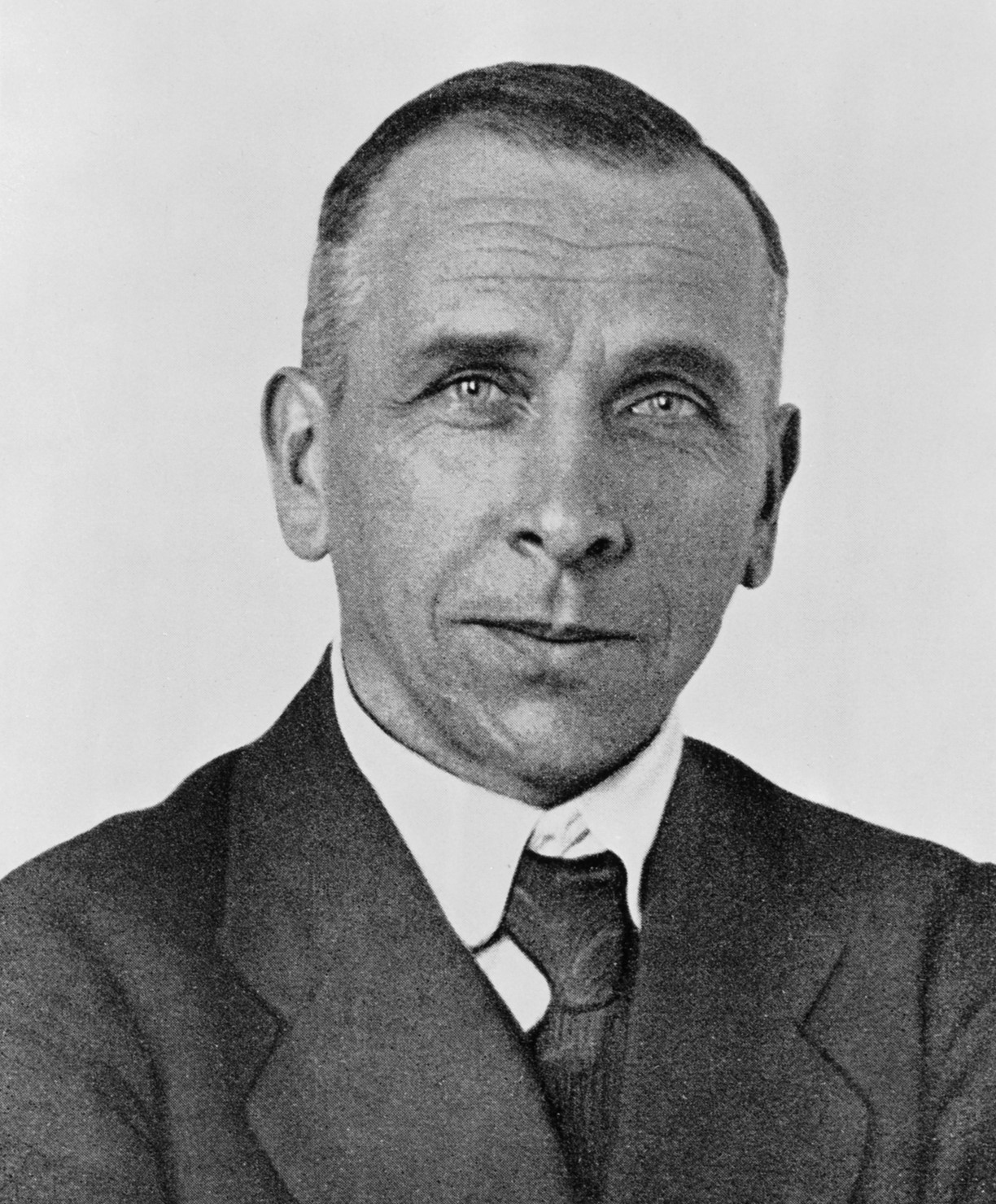
Alfred Wegener

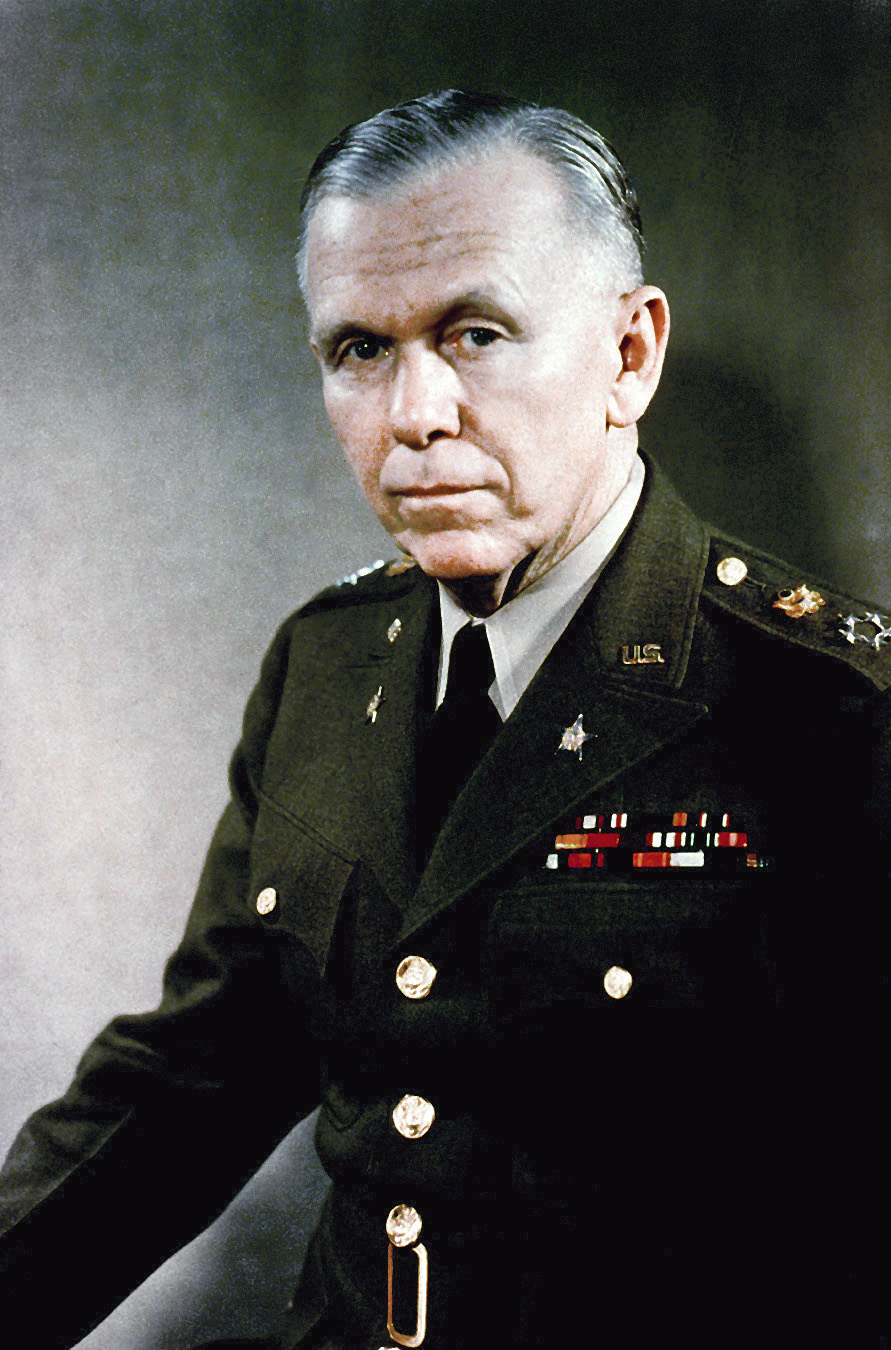
George Marshall

- November 1 – Alfred Wegener, German scientist, meteorologist (d. 1930)
- November 2 – John Foulds, English classical music composer (d. 1939)
- November 3 – Avra Theodoropoulou, Greek suffragist (d. 1963)
- November 5 – Richard Oswald, Austrian film director (d. 1963)
- November 6 – Robert Musil, Austrian novelist (d. 1942)
- November 9 – Giles Gilbert Scott, British architect (d. 1960)
- November 10 – Jacob Epstein, American-born sculptor (d. 1959)
- November 12 – Harold Rainsford Stark, American admiral (d. 1972)
- November 22
  - Charles Forbes, British admiral (d. 1960)
  - Pauline Ramart, French chemist and politician (d. 1953)
- November 25
  - John Flynn, Australian medical services pioneer (d. 1951)
  - Elsie J. Oxenham, English children's novelist (d. 1960)
- November 29 – Sara Allgood, Irish-American actress (d. 1950)
- December 1 – Joseph Trumpeldor, Russian Zionist (d. 1920)
- December 3 – Fedor von Bock, German field marshal (d. 1945)
- December 8 – Sin Ch'aeho, Korean independence activist (d. 1936)
- December 11 – Frank Tarrant, Australian cricketer (d. 1951)
- December 17 – Austin Hobart Clark, American zoologist (d. 1954)
- December 31 – George C. Marshall, United States Secretary of State, recipient of the Nobel Peace Prize (d. 1959)

1881

=== January ===
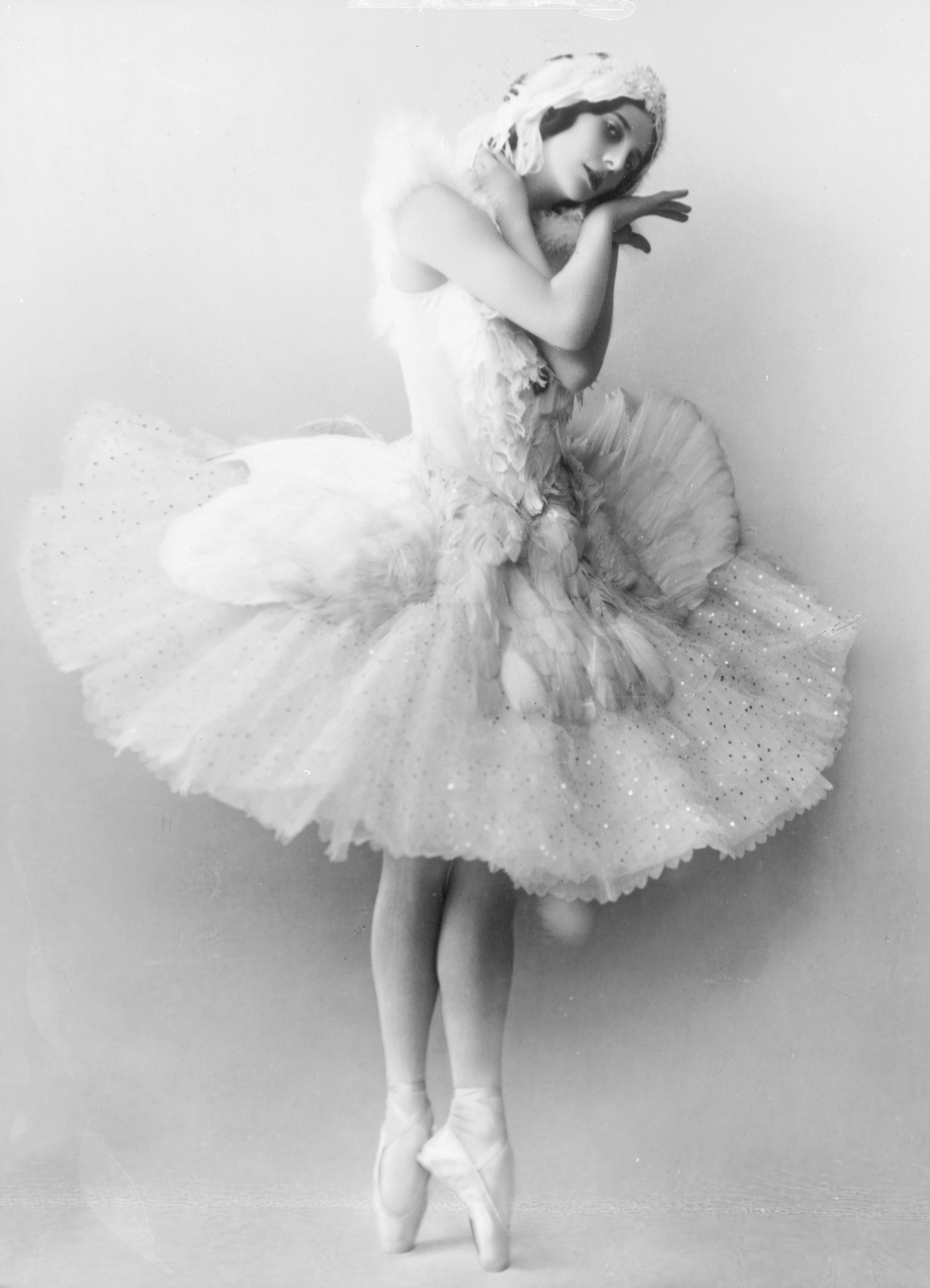
Anna Pavlova

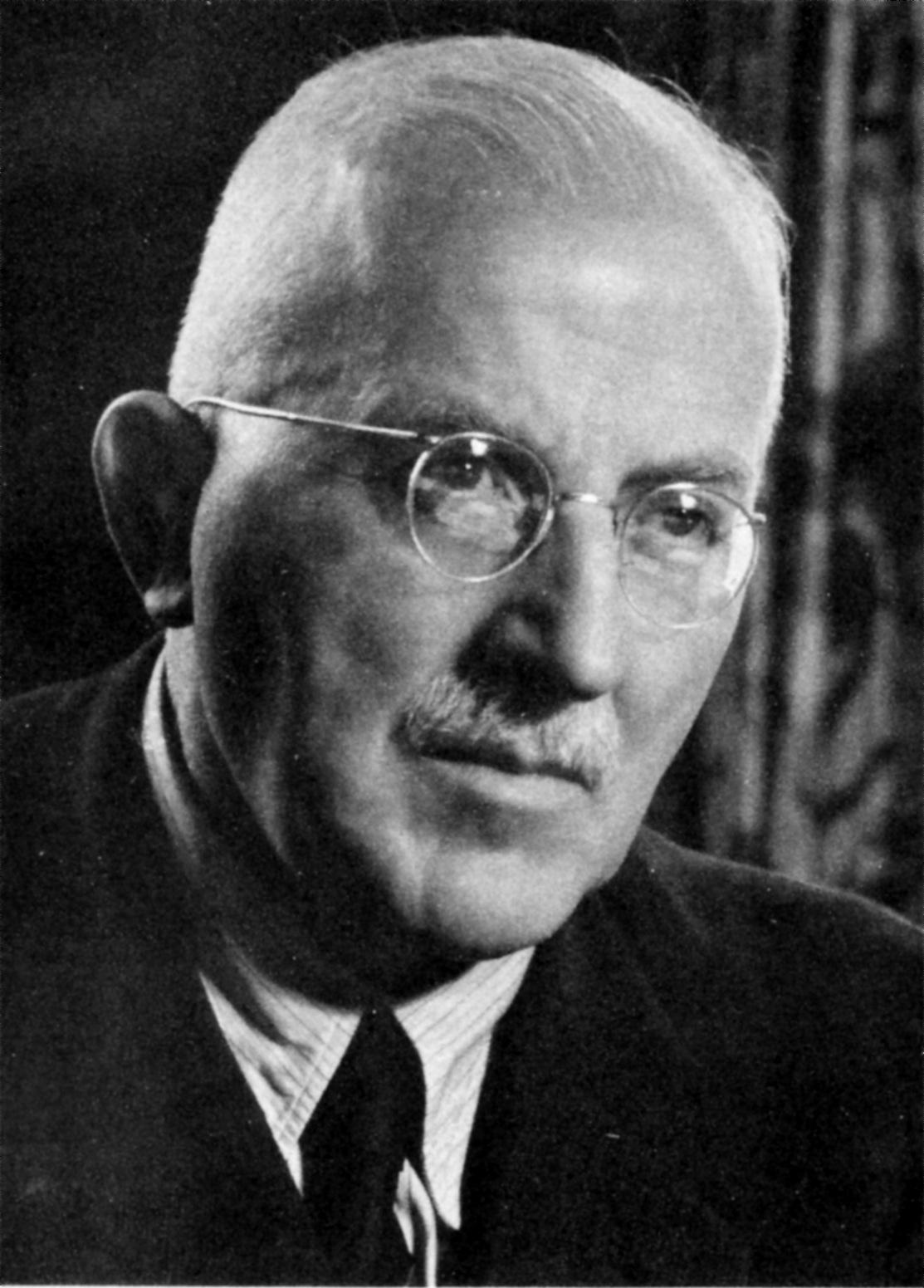
Hermann Staudinger

- January 9
  - Lascelles Abercrombie, English poet, critic (d. 1938)
  - Giovanni Papini, Italian essayist, poet and novelist (d. 1956)
- January 13 – Essington Lewis, Australian industrialist (d. 1961)
- January 15 – John Rodgers, American naval officer, naval aviation pioneer (d. 1926)
- January 23 – Luisa Casati, Italian heiress, artistic muse and patron of the arts (d. 1957)
- January 26 – Henry Wadsworth Longfellow Dana, American academic and activist (d. 1950)
- January 30 – Whitford Kane, Irish-born American actor (d. 1956)
- January 31 – Irving Langmuir, American chemist, Nobel Prize laureate (d. 1957)

=== February ===
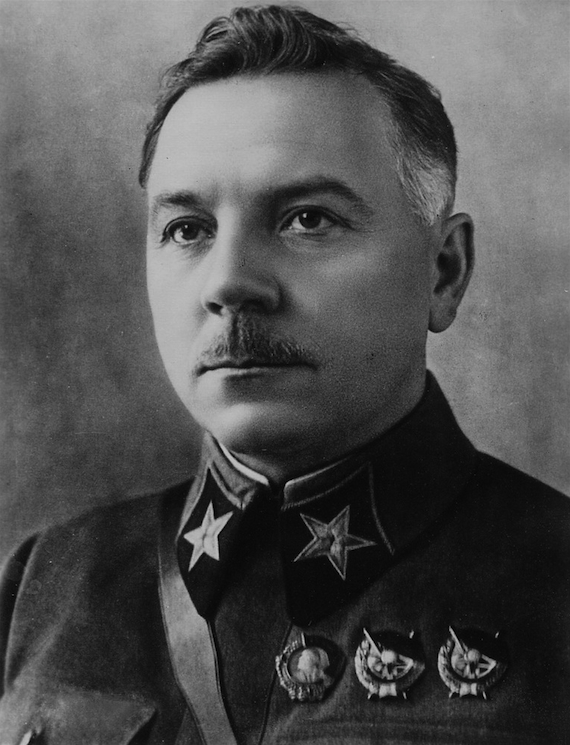
Kliment Voroshilov

- February 2 – Gustav Herglotz, German mathematician (d. 1953)
- February 4
  - Eulalio Gutiérrez, President of Mexico (d. 1939)
  - Fernand Léger, French artist (d. 1955)
  - Kliment Voroshilov, Russian military officer, politician (d. 1969)
- February 11 – Carlo Carrà, Italian painter (d. 1966)
- February 12 – Anna Pavlova, Russian ballerina (d. 1931)
- February 13 – Eleanor Farjeon, English children's writer, poet (d. 1965)
- February 17 – Bess Streeter Aldrich, American fiction writer (d. 1954)
- February 21 – Kenneth J. Alford, British soldier, composer (d. 1945)
- February 25 – Alexei Rykov, Premier of Russia and Premier of the Soviet Union (d. 1938)
- February 27 – Sveinn Björnsson, 1st president of Iceland (d. 1952)
- February 28 – Otto Dowling, United States Navy Captain, 25th Governor of American Samoa (d. 1946)

=== March ===
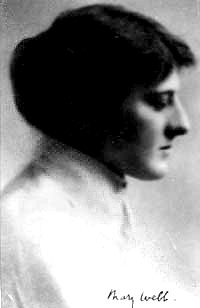
Mary Webb

- March 4
  - T. S. Stribling, American novelist (d. 1965)
  - Richard C. Tolman, American mathematical physicist (d. 1948)
- March 9 – Ernest Bevin, British labour leader, politician and statesman (d. 1951)
- March 10 – Thomas Quinlan, English operatic impresario (d. 1951)
- March 17 – Walter Rudolf Hess, Swiss physiologist, Nobel Prize laureate (d. 1973)
- March 22 – Hans Wilsdorf, German-Swiss watchmaker, founder of Rolex (d. 1960)
- March 23
  - Roger Martin du Gard, French writer, Nobel Prize laureate (d. 1958)
  - Hermann Staudinger, German chemist, Nobel Prize laureate (d. 1965)
- March 25
  - Béla Bartók, Hungarian composer (d. 1945)
  - Mary Webb, English novelist (d. 1927)
- March 26 – Guccio Gucci, Italian fashion designer, founder of Gucci (d. 1953)

=== April ===
- April 1 – Octavian Goga, 37th prime minister of Romania (d. 1938)
- April 3 – Alcide De Gasperi, Italian statesman, politician, 30th prime minister of Italy (d. 1954)
- April 12 – Rudolf Ramek, 5th Chancellor of Austria (d. 1941)
- April 14 – Husain Salaahuddin, Maldivian writer (d. 1948)
- April 16 – Edward Wood, 1st Earl of Halifax, British politician (d. 1959)
- April 24 – Harald Giersing, Danish painter (d. 1927)
- April 26 – Friedrich Johannes Hugo von Engelken, Director of the United States Mint from 1916 to 1917 (d. 1930)
- April 27 – Móric Esterházy, 18th prime minister of Hungary (d. 1960)

=== May ===
- May 1 – Mary MacLane, Canadian writer (d. 1929)
- May 2 – Harry J. Capehart, American lawyer, politician, and businessperson (d. 1955)
- May 4 – Alexander Kerensky, Russian politician (d. 1970)
- May 13 – Lima Barreto, Brazilian writer (d. 1922)
- May 14 – George Murray Hulbert, American politician (d. 1950)
- May 19 – Mustafa Kemal Atatürk, founder of the Republic of Turkiye and the first President of Turkey, Turkish field marshal and statesman (official birthday; d. 1938)
- May 20 – Władysław Sikorski, Polish general, politician (d. 1943)
- May 26 – Adolfo de la Huerta, 38th President of Mexico (d. 1955)
- May 30 – Georg von Küchler, German field marshal (d. 1968)

=== June ===
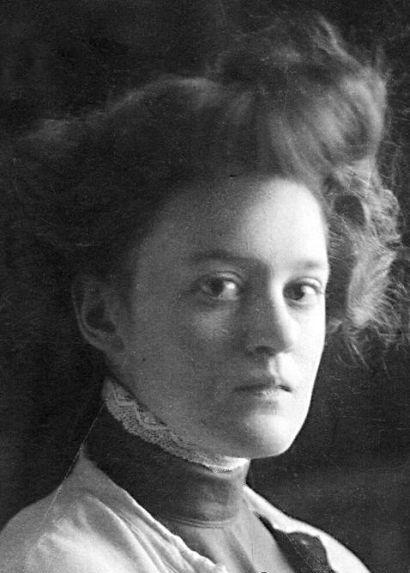
Maggie Gripenberg

- June 3 – Juliusz Rómmel, Polish general (d. 1967)
- June 9 – Marion Leonard, American silent film actress (d. 1956)
- June 11 – Maggie Gripenberg, Finnish dancer and choreographer (d. 1976)
- June 17 – Tommy Burns, Canadian boxer (d. 1955)

=== July ===
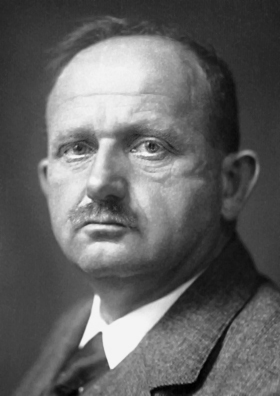
Hans Fischer

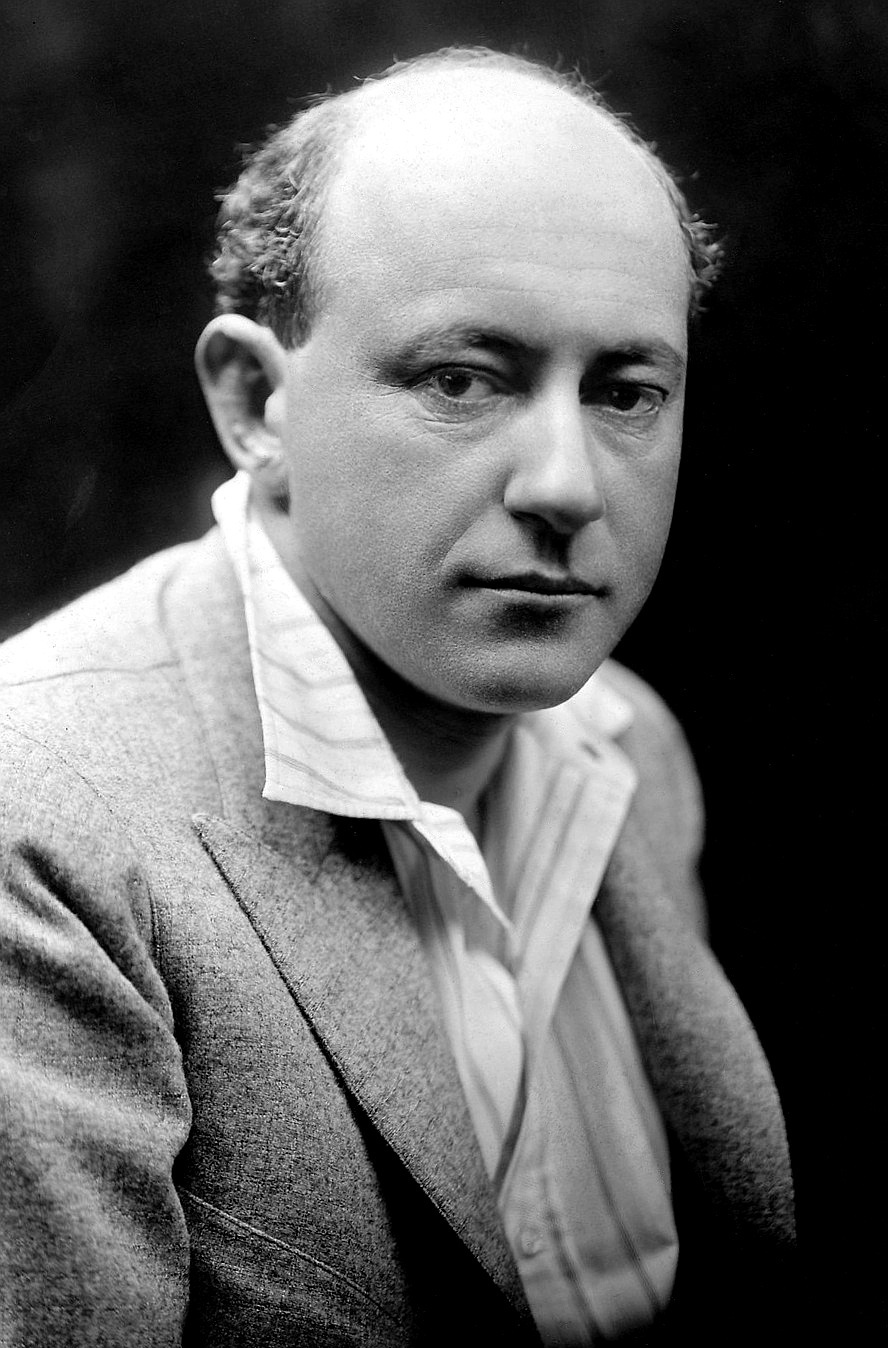
Cecil B. DeMille

- July 3 – Leon Errol, Australian actor and comedian (d. 1951)
- July 4 – Ulysses S. Grant III, American soldier, planner (d. 1968)
- July 6 – Leo Bagrow, Russian-born historian of cartography (d. 1957)
- July 22 – Kenneth Whiting, United States Navy officer, submarine and naval aviation pioneer (d. 1943)
- July 27 – Hans Fischer, German chemist, Nobel Prize laureate (d. 1945)
- July 28 – Günther Quandt, German industrialist, founder of the industrial empire that in modern times includes BMW and Altana (d. 1954)
- July 30 – Smedley Butler, United States Marine Corps general (d. 1940)

=== August ===
- August 6 – Sir Alexander Fleming, Scottish biomedical researcher, recipient of the Nobel Prize in Physiology or Medicine (d. 1955)
- August 7 – François Darlan, French admiral and 81st prime minister of France from 1941 to 1942 (d. 1942)
- August 8 – Paul Ludwig Ewald von Kleist, German field marshal (b. 1954)
- August 12 – Cecil B. DeMille, American film director, producer (d. 1959)
- August 19 – George Enescu, Romanian composer (d. 1955)
- August 20 – Edgar A. Guest, English poet (d. 1959)
- August 25 – Émile Aubrun French aviator (d. 1967)

=== September ===
- September 5
  - Otto Bauer, Austrian Social Democratic politician (d. 1938)
  - Henry Maitland Wilson, British field marshal (d. 1964)
- September 8
  - Harry Hillman, American track athlete (d. 1945)
  - Refik Saydam, 4th prime minister of Turkey (d. 1942)
- September 11 – Asta Nielsen, Danish silent film star (d. 1972)
- September 12 – Daniel Jones, British phonetician (d. 1967)
- September 15 – Ettore Bugatti, Italian car designer, founder of Bugatti (d. 1947)
- September 16 – Clive Bell, English art critic (d. 1964)
- September 17 – Aubrey Faulkner, South African cricketer (d. 1930)
- September 25
  - Tullo Morgagni, Italian journalist, sports race organizer, and aviation enthusiast (d. 1919)
  - Lu Xun, leading figure of modern Chinese literature (d. 1936)
- September 26 – Hiram Wesley Evans, American Ku Klux Klan Imperial Wizard (d. 1966)
- September 29 – Ludwig von Mises, Austrian economist (d. 1973)

=== October ===
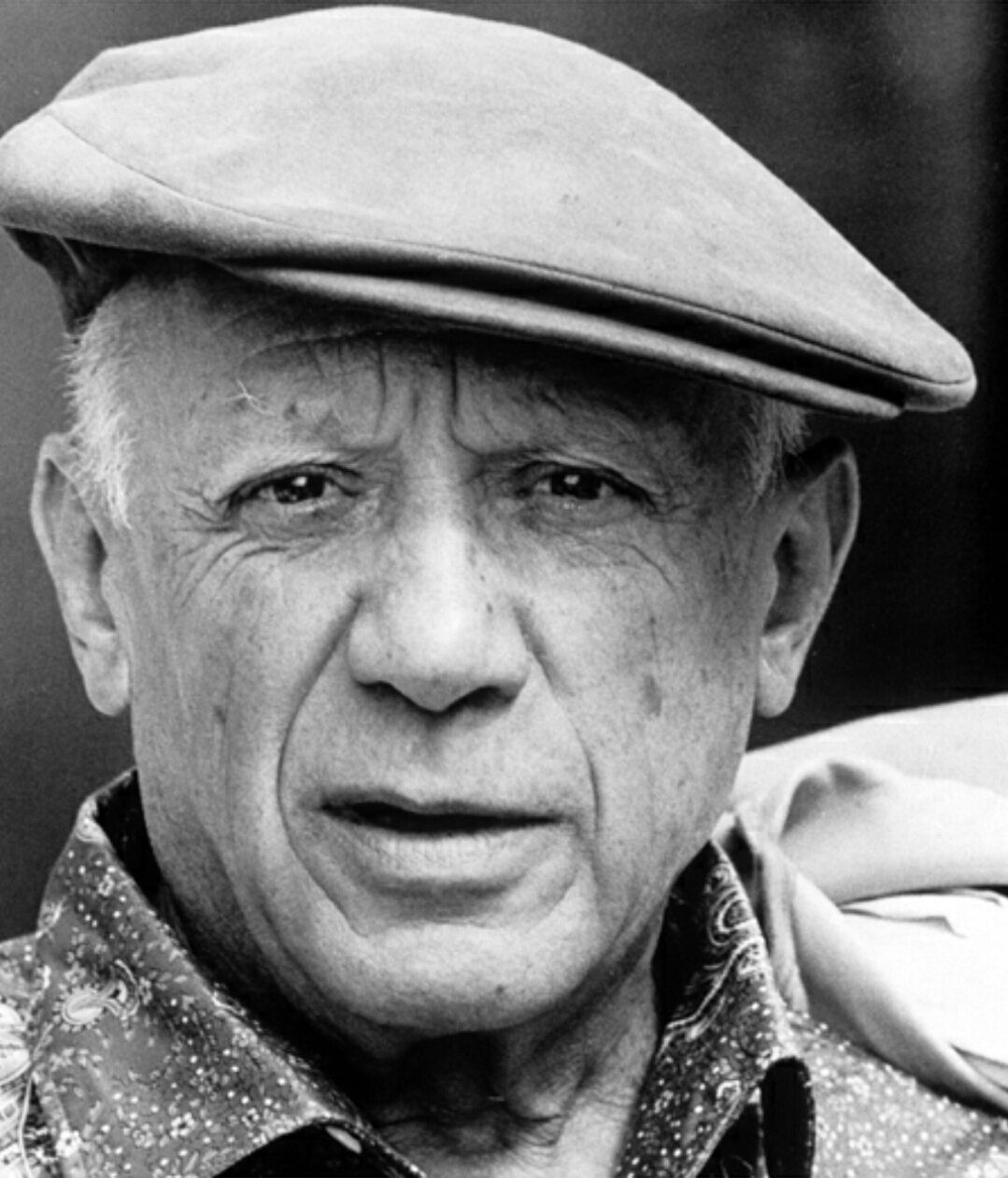
Pablo Picasso

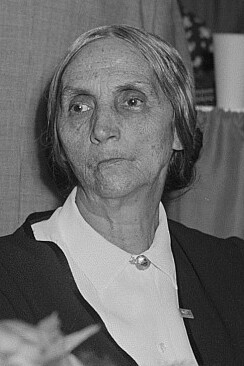
Eugénie Cotton

- October 1
  - William E. Boeing, American engineer, airplane manufacturer (d. 1956)
  - Kanichiro Tashiro, Japanese general (d. 1937)
- October 2 – Pannalal Bose, Indian educationist, first Education Minister of West Bengal, translated Rabindranath Tagore's ক্ষুধিত পাষাণ (Khudto Pashan) into The Hungry Stone (d. 1956)
- October 4 – Walther von Brauchitsch, German field marshal (d. 1948)
- October 6 – Kiyoshi Katsuki, Japanese general (d. 1950)
- October 11 – Hans Kelsen, Austrian legal theorist (d. 1973)
- October 13 – Eugénie Cotton, French physicist, socialist, women's rights advocate (d. 1967)
- October 15
  - William Temple, English Archbishop of Canterbury (d. 1944)
  - P. G. Wodehouse, English-born comic writer (d. 1975)
- October 22 – Clinton Davisson, American physicist, Nobel Prize laureate (d. 1958)
- October 25 – Pablo Picasso, Spanish painter (d. 1973)
- October 26 – Margaret Wycherly, English stage, film actress (d. 1956)

=== November ===
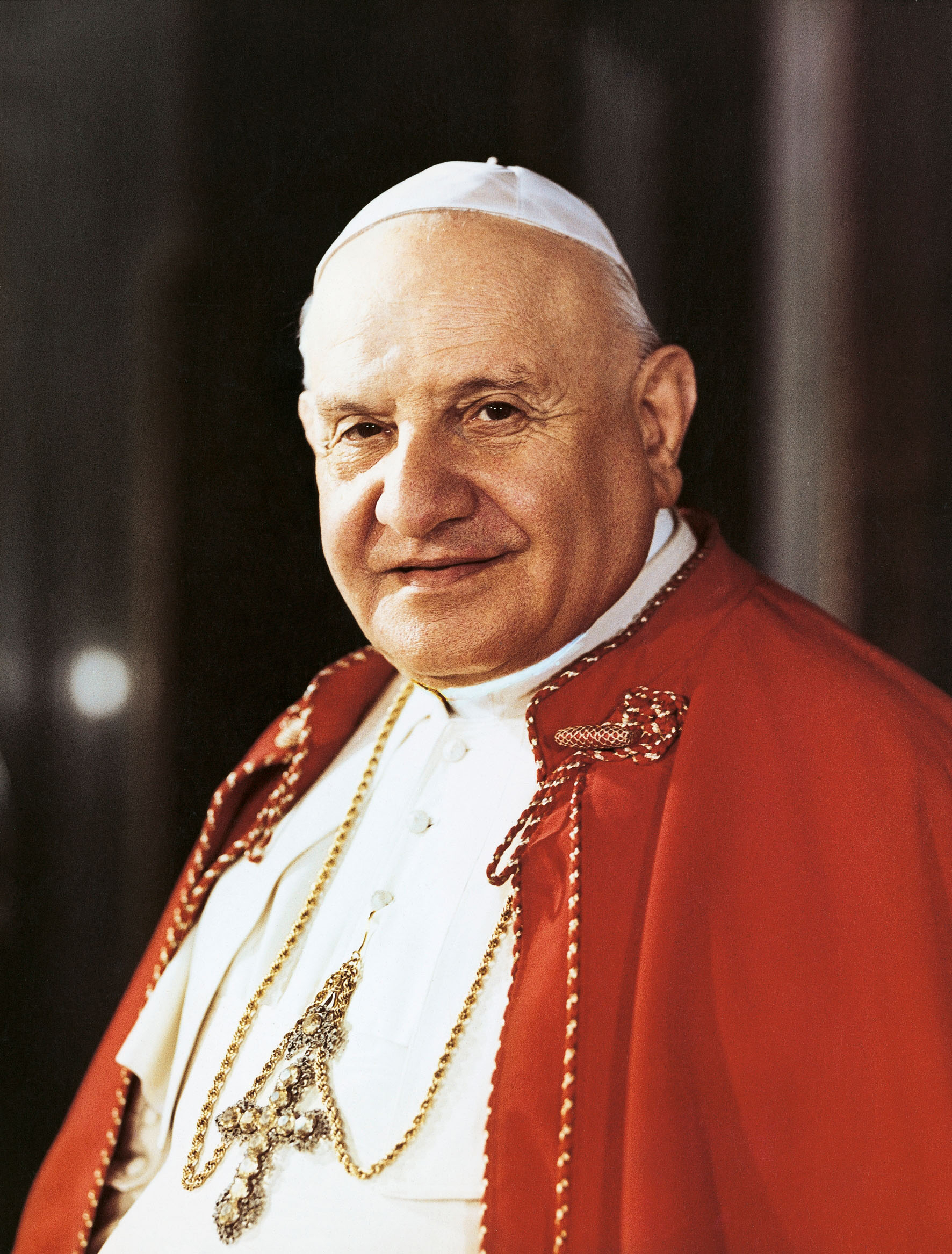
Pope John XXIII

- November 4 – Gaby Deslys, French dancer, actress (d. 1920)
- November 5 – George A. Malcolm, American lawyer, Associate Justice of the Supreme Court of the Philippines and educator (d. 1961)
- November 8 – Robert Esnault-Pelterie, French aircraft designer, pioneer rocket theorist (d. 1957)
- November 12 – Maximilian von Weichs, German field marshal (d. 1954)
- November 14 – Nicholas Schenck, Russian-born American film studio executive (d. 1969)
- November 15 – Franklin P. Adams, American columnist, poet (d. 1960)
- November 24
  - Al Christie, Canadian-born director, producer (d. 1951)
  - Ye Gongchuo, Chinese politician, poet, and calligrapher (d. 1968)
- November 25
  - Jacob Fichman, Romanian-born Israeli poet, essayist (d. 1958)
  - Pope John XXIII (b. Angelo Roncalli), Italian pontiff (1958–1963) (d. 1963)
- November 28 – Stefan Zweig, Austrian writer (d. 1942)

=== December ===
- December 2 – Heinrich Barkhausen, German physicist (d. 1956)
- December 3 – Henry Fillmore, American composer, bandleader (d. 1956)
- December 8 – Tuomas Bryggari, Finnish politician (d. 1964)
- December 16 – Henri Dentz, French general (d. 1945)
- December 23 – Juan Ramón Jiménez, Spanish writer, Nobel Prize laureate (d. 1958)
- December 25 – John Dill, British Army field marshal (d. 1944)
- December 30 – Wiktor Thommée, Polish general (d. 1962)

1882

=== January ===
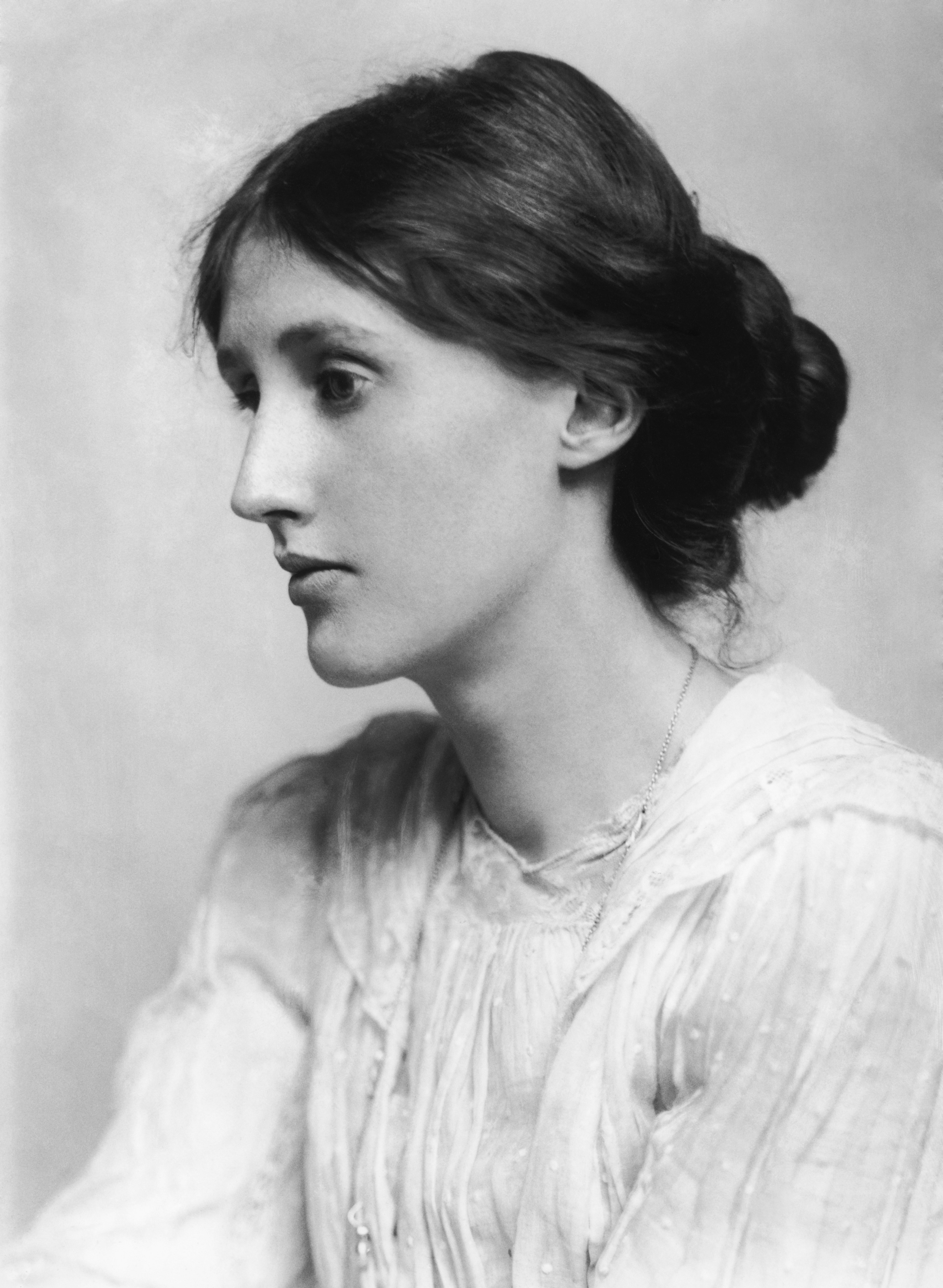
Virginia Woolf

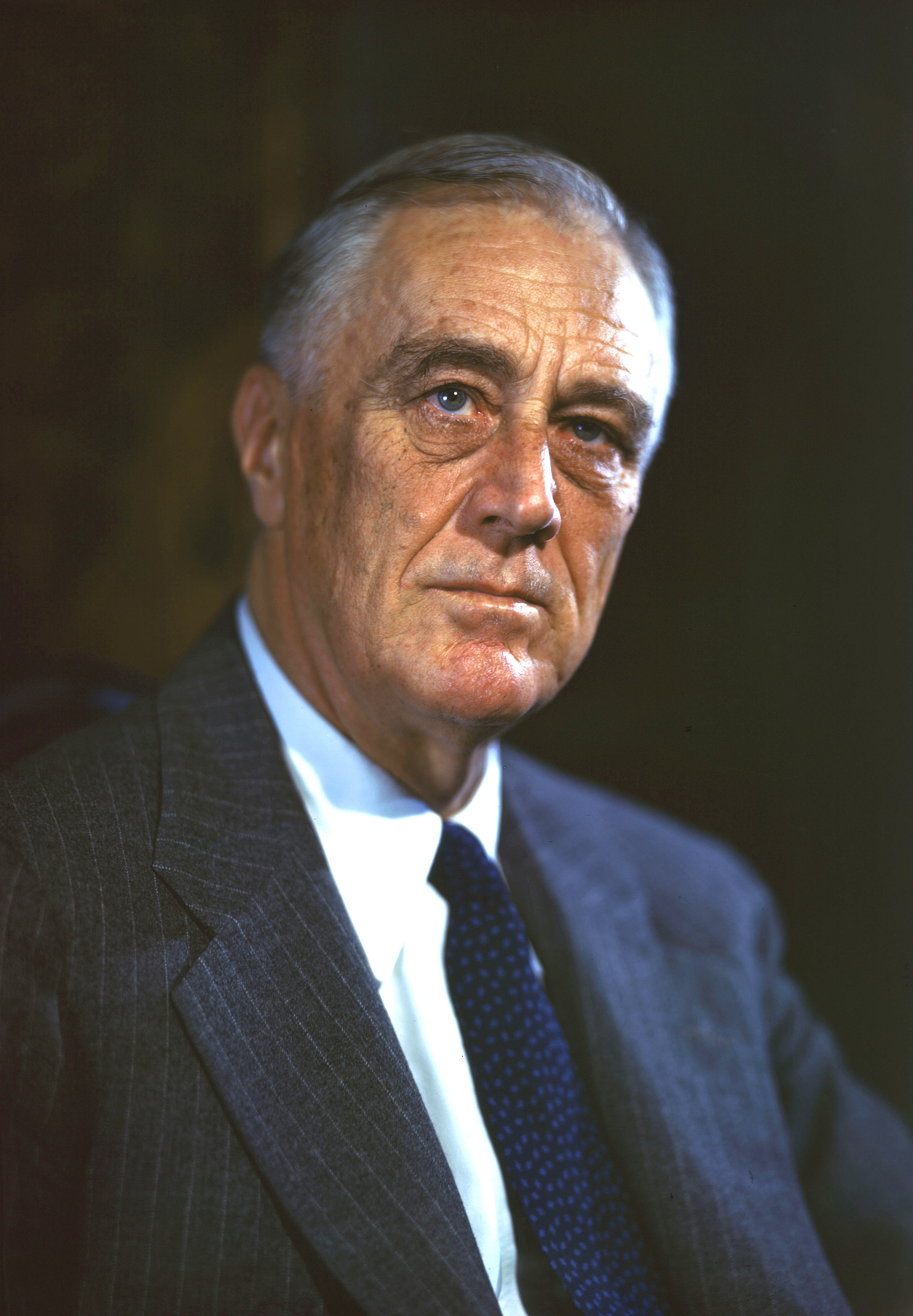
Franklin D. Roosevelt

- January 5 – Edwin Barclay, 18th president of Liberia (d. 1955)
- January 6
  - Fan Noli, Albanian poet, political figure (d. 1965)
  - Ferdinand Pecora, Sicilian-born American lawyer (d. 1971)
  - Sam Rayburn, Speaker of the United States House of Representatives (d. 1961)
- January 9 – Otto Ruge, Norwegian general (d. 1961)
- January 12 – Milton Sills, American actor (d. 1930)
- January 17
  - Arnold Rothstein, American gangster (d. 1928)
  - Noah Beery, American actor (d. 1946)
- January 18 – A. A. Milne, British author (d. 1956)
- January 20 – Johnny Torrio, Italian-born American gangster (d. 1957)
- January 22 – Theodore Kosloff, Russian-born actor (d. 1956)
- January 23 – Anna Abrikosova, Soviet Roman Catholic religious sister and servant of God (d. 1936)
- January 25 – Virginia Woolf, English writer (d. 1941)
- January 28
  - Mary Boland, American actress (d. 1965)
  - Gengo Hyakutake, Japanese admiral (d. 1976)
  - Pascual Orozco, Mexican revolutionary (d. 1915)
- January 30 – Franklin D. Roosevelt, 32nd President of the United States (d. 1945)
- January 31 – Fritz Leiber, American stage, screen actor (d. 1949)

=== February ===
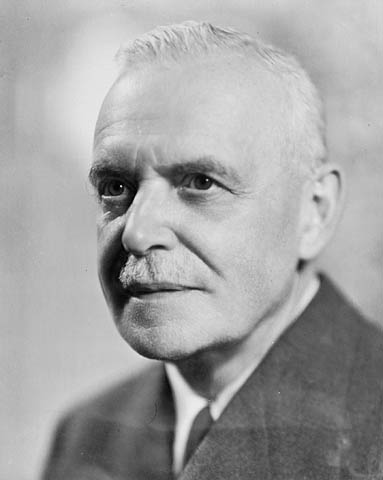
Louis St. Laurent

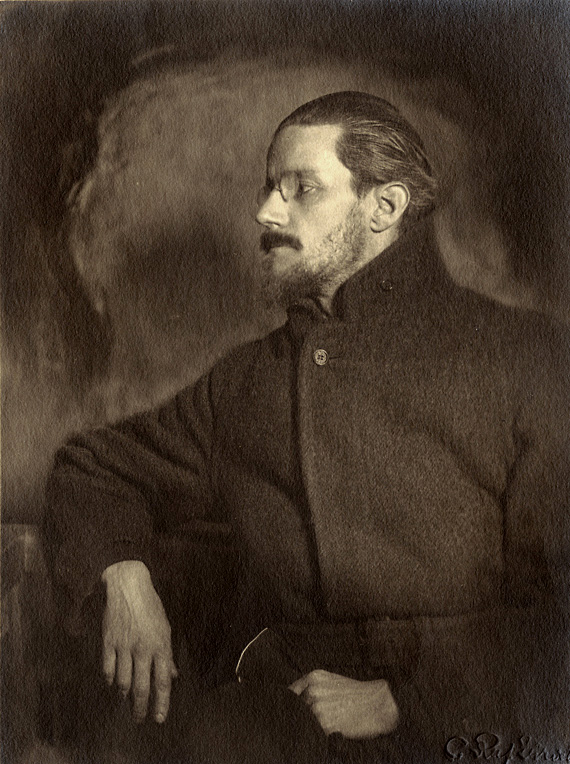
James Joyce

- February 1
  - Vladimir Dimitrov, Bulgarian artist (d. 1960)
  - Louis St. Laurent, 12th Prime Minister of Canada (d. 1973)
- February 2
  - Anne Bauchens, American film editor (d. 1967)
  - James Joyce, Irish author (d. 1941)
- February 4 – E. J. Pratt, Canadian poet (d. 1964)
- February 5 – Louis Wagner, French Grand Prix racer, aviator (d. 1960)
- February 11
  - Valli Valli, German-born British actress (d. 1927)
  - Joe Jordan, American ragtime composer (d. 1971)
- February 12 – Walter Nash, 27th Prime Minister of New Zealand (d. 1968)
- February 15 – John Barrymore, American actor (d. 1942)
- February 18 – Petre Dumitrescu, Romanian general (d. 1950)
- February 20 – Alexander Carrick, Scottish sculptor (d. 1966)
- February 22 – Eric Gill, English sculptor, writer (d. 1940)
- February 24 – Bosman di Ravelli, South African concert pianist, composer, and writer (d. 1967)
- February 26 – Husband E. Kimmel, American admiral (d. 1968)
- February 28
  - Geraldine Farrar, American soprano (d. 1967)
  - Herbert Silberer, Austrian psychoanalyst (d. 1923)

=== March ===
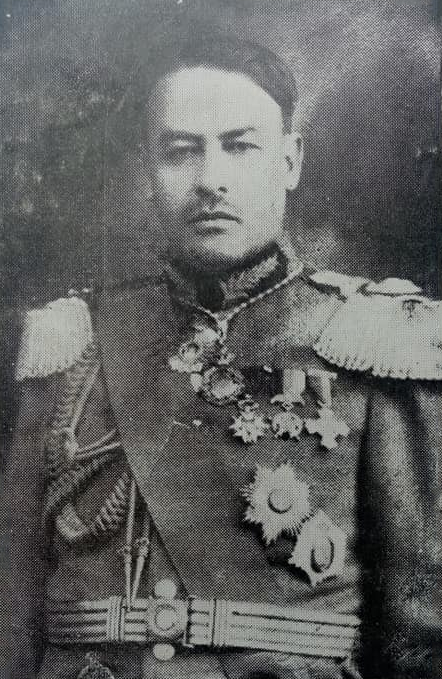
Carlos Blanco Galindo

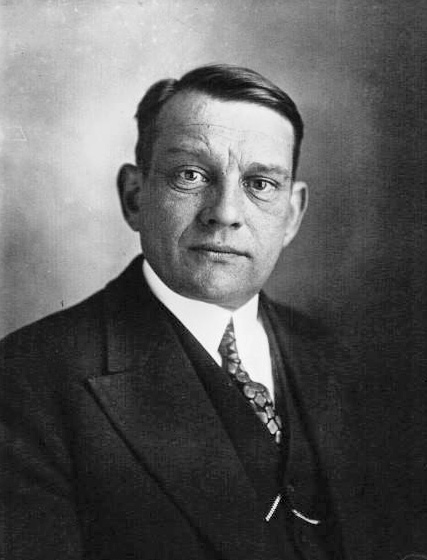
René Coty

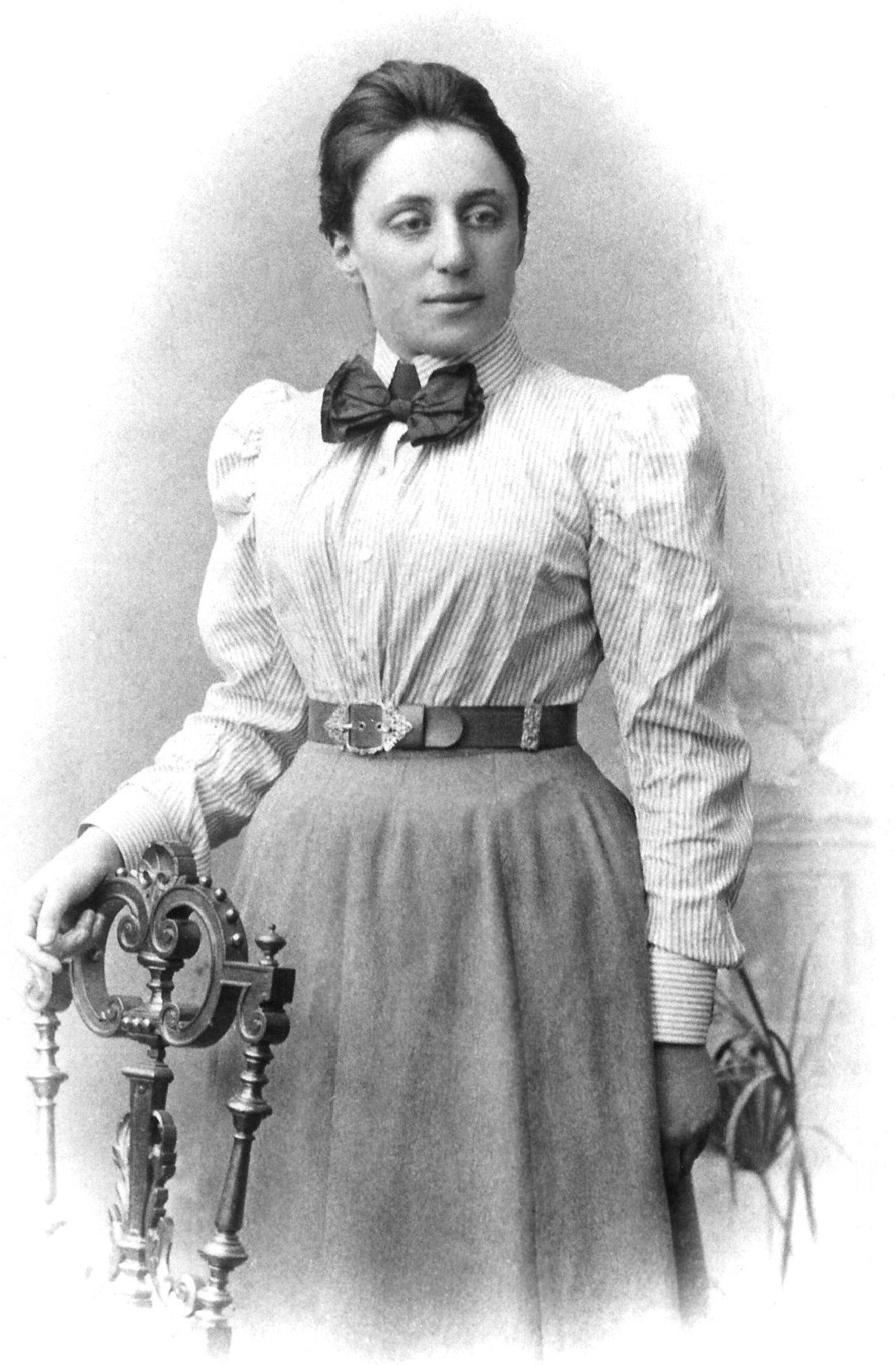
Emmy Noether

- March 3 – Charles Ponzi, Italian-born American con man (d. 1949)
- March 6 – F. Burrall Hoffman, American architect (d. 1980)
- March 8 – Alfred A. Cunningham, first United States Marine Corps aviator (d. 1939)
- March 12 – Carlos Blanco Galindo, 32nd President of Bolivia (d. 1943)
- March 14
  - Wacław Sierpiński, Polish mathematician (d. 1969)
  - Giuseppe Tellera, Italian general (d. 1941)
- March 15 – Jim Lightbody, American middle-distance runner (d. 1953)
- March 18 – Gian Francesco Malipiero, Italian composer (d. 1973)
- March 20 – René Coty, 17th President of France (d. 1962)
- March 22 – John W. Wilcox Jr., American admiral (d. 1942)
- March 23 – Emmy Noether, German mathematician (d. 1935)
- March 24 – George Monckton-Arundell, 8th Viscount Galway, English politician, 5th Governor-General of New Zealand (d. 1943)
- March 30
  - Melanie Klein, Austrian-born British child psychoanalyst (d. 1960)
  - Vittorio Tur, Italian admiral (d. 1969)

=== April ===
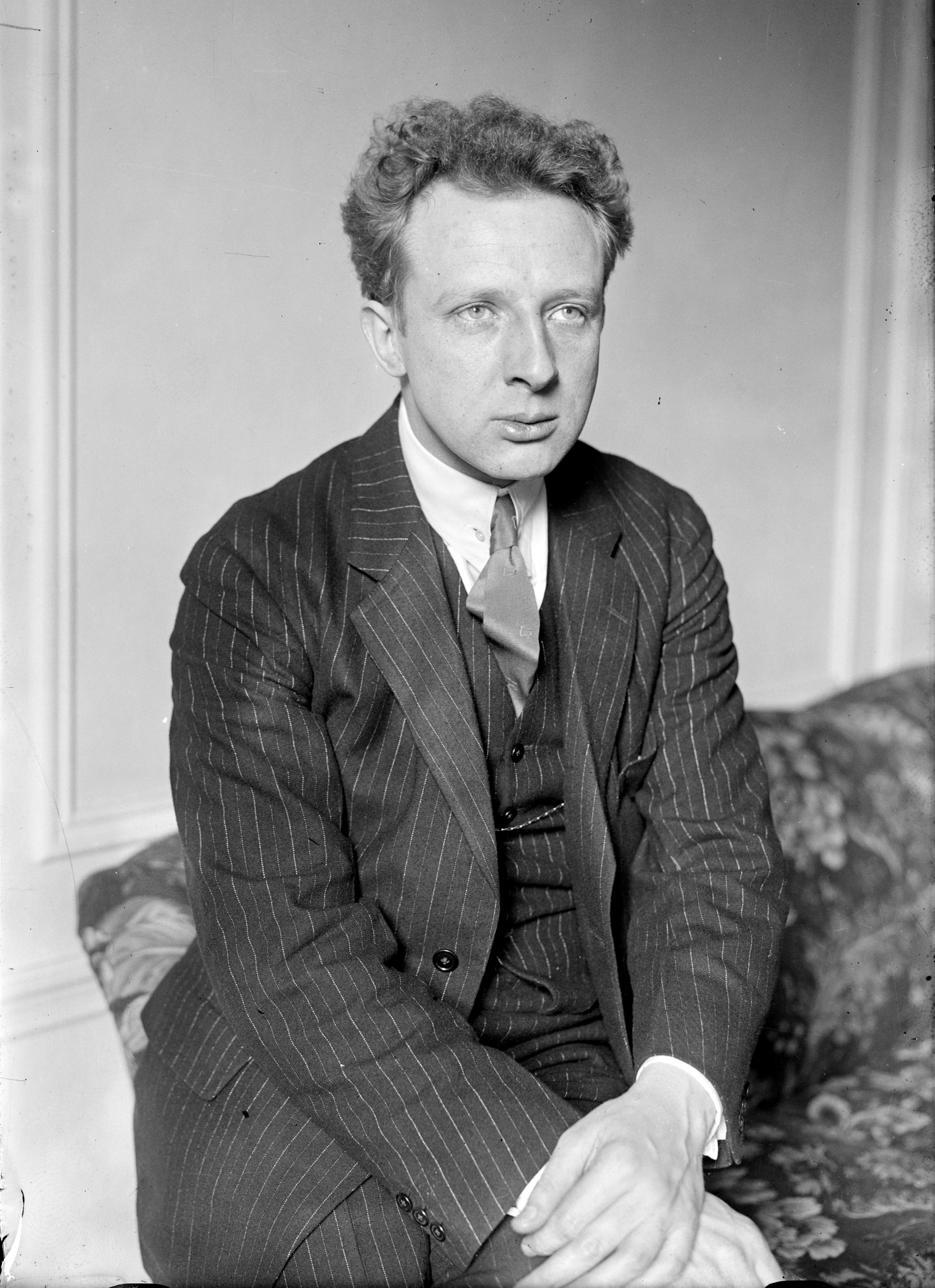
Leopold Stokowski

- April 7 – Kurt von Schleicher, Chancellor of Germany (d. 1934)
- April 17 – Artur Schnabel, Polish pianist (d. 1951)
- April 18
  - Monteiro Lobato, Brazilian writer (d. 1948)
  - Leopold Stokowski, English conductor (d. 1977)
- April 19 – Getúlio Vargas, 14th and 17th president of Brazil (d. 1954)
- April 20
  - Nicolae Ciupercă, Romanian general and politician (d. 1950)
  - Holland Smith, American general (d. 1967)
- April 21 – Percy Williams Bridgman, American physicist, Nobel Prize laureate (d. 1961)
- April 24 – Hugh Dowding, commander of the RAF Fighter Command during the Battle of Britain (d. 1970)
- April 29 – Hendrik Nicolaas Werkman, Dutch artist, printer (d. 1945)

=== May ===
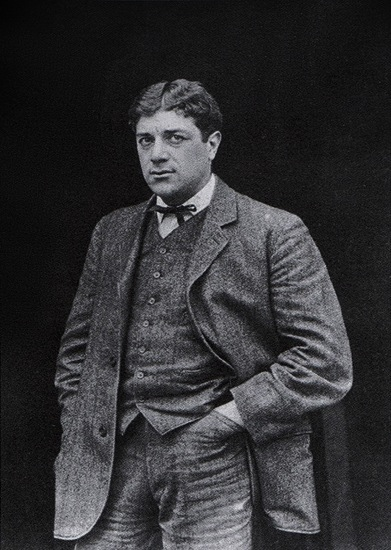
Georges Braque

- May 2 – James F. Byrnes, American politician, Secretary of State and Associate Justice of the Supreme Court of the United States (d. 1972)
- May 5
  - Sylvia Pankhurst, English suffragette (d. 1960)
  - Sir Douglas Mawson, Australian Antarctic explorer (d. 1958)
- May 6 – Crown Prince Wilhelm of Germany, heir-apparent of Emperor Wilhelm II (d. 1951)
- May 9 – Henry J. Kaiser, American industrialist (d. 1967)
- May 10 – Thurston Hall, American stage & screen actor (d. 1958)
- May 13 – Georges Braque, French painter (d. 1963)
- May 16 – Mary Gordon, Scottish stage and screen actress (d. 1963)
- May 20
  - Sigrid Undset, Norwegian author, Nobel Prize laureate (d. 1949)
  - Fannie Salter, American lighthouse keeper (d. 1966)
- May 25 – Marie Doro, American stage, silent film actress (d. 1956)
- May 26 – Jess McMahon, American professional boxing, wrestling promoter (d. 1954)
- May 28 – Avery Hopwood, American playwright (d. 1928)
- May 30 – Wyndham Halswelle, British runner (d. 1915)

=== June ===
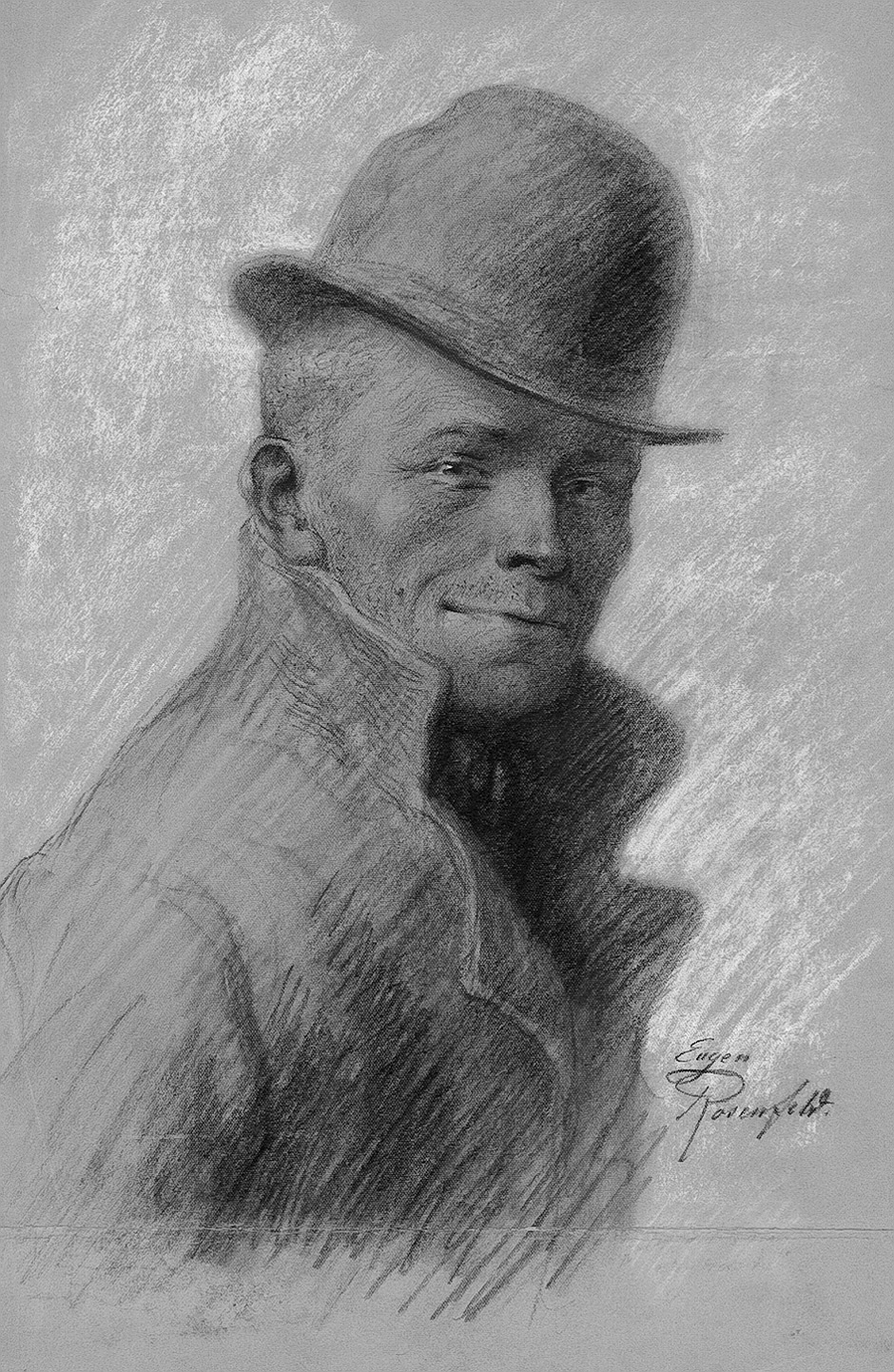
Karl Valentin

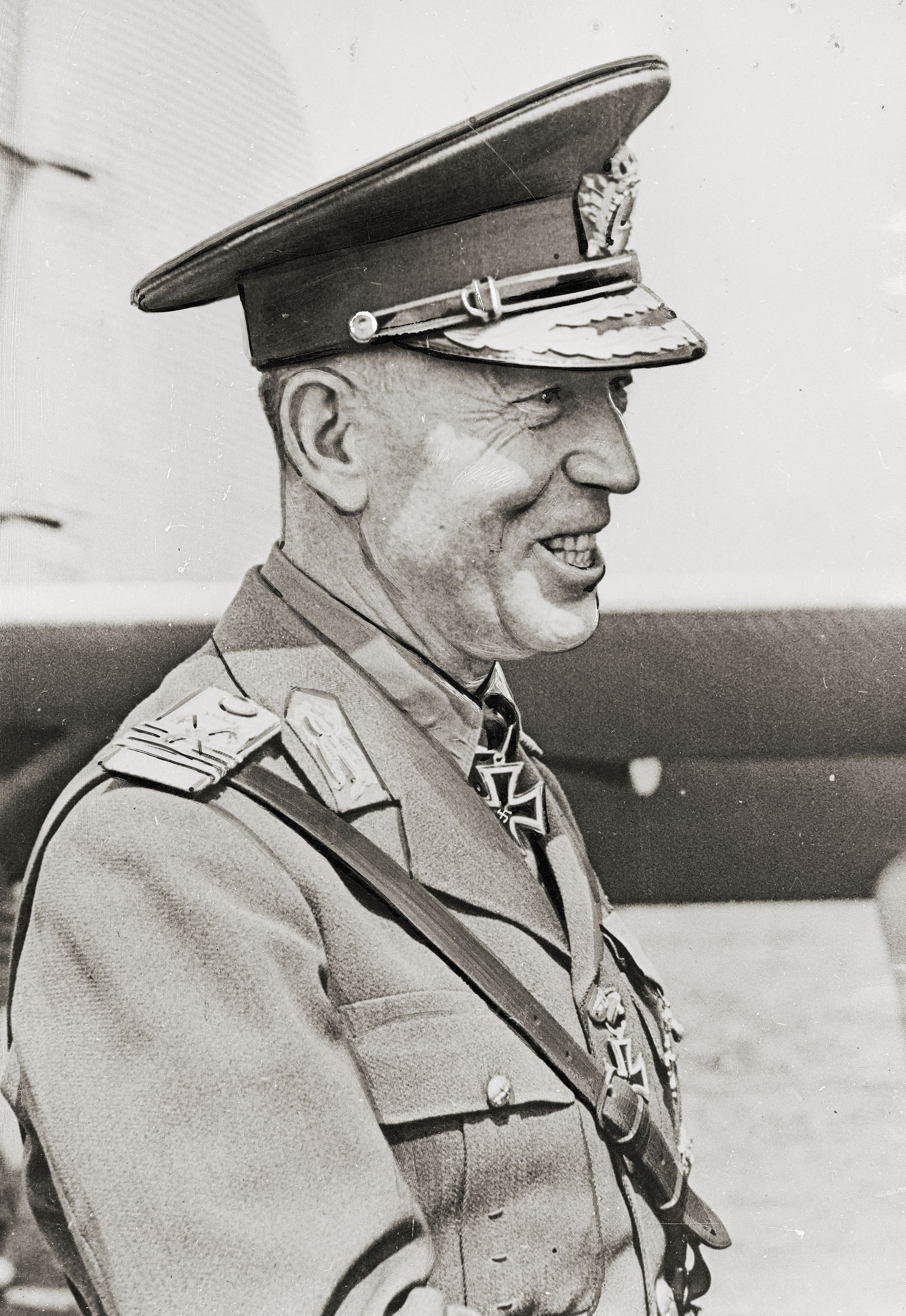
Ion Antonescu

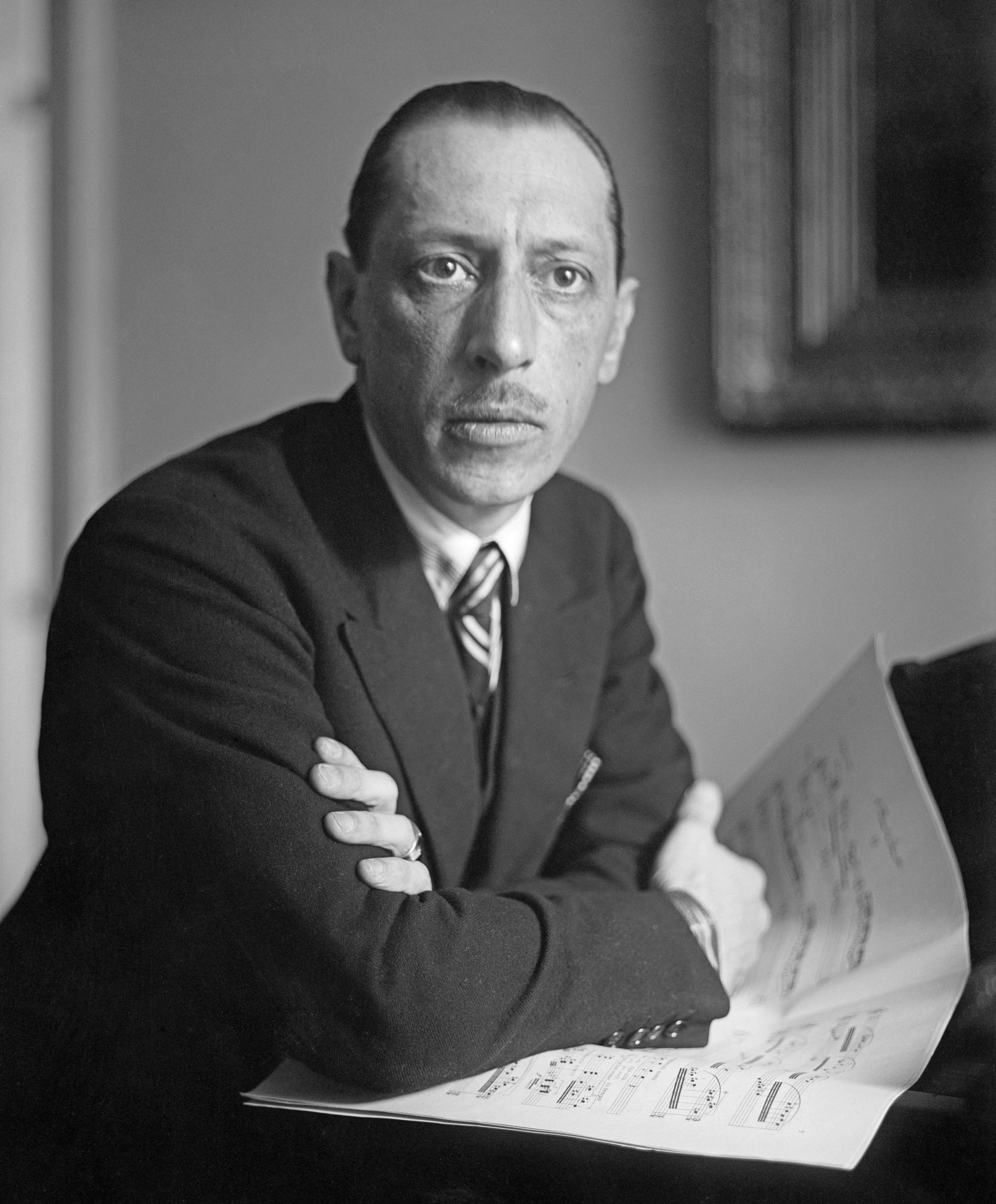
Igor Stravinsky

- June 4 – Karl Valentin, German actor (d. 1948)
- June 9 – Robert Kerr, Canadian sprinter (d. 1963)
- June 10 – Nevile Henderson, British diplomat (d. 1942)
- June 12 – Roi Cooper Megrue, American playwright (d. 1927)
- June 15 – Ion Antonescu, Romanian prime minister, dictator (d. 1946)
- June 16 – Mohammad Mosaddegh, Iranian politician, 35th Prime Minister of Iran (d. 1967)
- June 17
  - Adolphus Frederick VI, Grand Duke of Mecklenburg-Strelitz (d. 1918)
  - Igor Stravinsky, Russian composer (d. 1971)
- June 18 – Georgi Dimitrov, 32nd Prime Minister of Bulgaria (d. 1949)
- June 21 – Lluís Companys, President of Catalonia (d. 1940)
- June 28 – Valeska Suratt, American stage actress, silent film star (d. 1962)
- June 29 – Ole Singstad, Norwegian-American civil engineer (d. 1969)

=== July ===
- July 1 – Bidhan Chandra Roy, Indian physician and politician, Chief Minister of West Bengal (d. 1962)
- July 8 – Percy Grainger, Australian composer (d. 1961)
- July 10 – Ima Hogg, American society leader, philanthropist, patron and collector of the arts (d. 1975)
- July 17 – James Somerville, British admiral (d. 1949)
- July 22 – Edward Hopper, American painter (d. 1967)
- July 25 – George S. Rentz, United States Navy Chaplain, Navy Cross winner (d. 1942)
- July 27
  - Donald Crisp, English actor, film director, screenwriter, and producer (d. 1974)
  - Geoffrey de Havilland, British aviation pioneer, aircraft company founder (d. 1965)
- July 31
  - Itamar Ben-Avi, first native speaker of Modern Hebrew (d. 1943)

=== August ===
- August 11 – Rodolfo Graziani, Italian general (d. 1955)
- August 14 – Gisela Richter, English art historian (d. 1972)
- August 16 – Christian Mortensen, Danish supercentenarian, oldest verified male ever at the time of his death (d. 1998)
- August 19 – MacGillivray Milne, United States Navy Captain, 27th Governor of American Samoa (d. 1959)
- August 22 – Raymonde de Laroche, French aviator, first woman to receive an aviator's license (d. 1919)
- August 25 – Seán T. O'Kelly, second President of Ireland (d. 1966)
- August 26 – James Franck, German-born physicist, Nobel Prize laureate (d. 1964)

=== September ===
- September 1 – Nicholas H. Heck, American geophysicist, oceanographer, and surveyor (d. 1953)
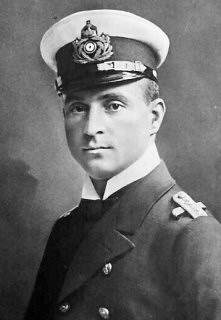
  Otto Weddigen
- September 8 – Sada Cowan, American playwright and screenwriter (d. 1943)
- September 10 – Károly Huszár, 25th Prime Minister of Hungary (d. 1941)
- September 11 – William T. Bovie, American biophysicist, inventor (d. 1958)
- September 12 – Ion Agârbiceanu, Romanian writer, journalist, politician and priest (d. 1963)
- September 13 – Ramón Grau, Cuban president (d. 1969)
- September 15 - Otto Weddigen, German U-boat commander during World War I (killed in action) (d. 1915)
- September 16 – Robert Hichens, RMS Titanic quartermaster, man at the wheel when Titanic hit the iceberg (d. 1940)
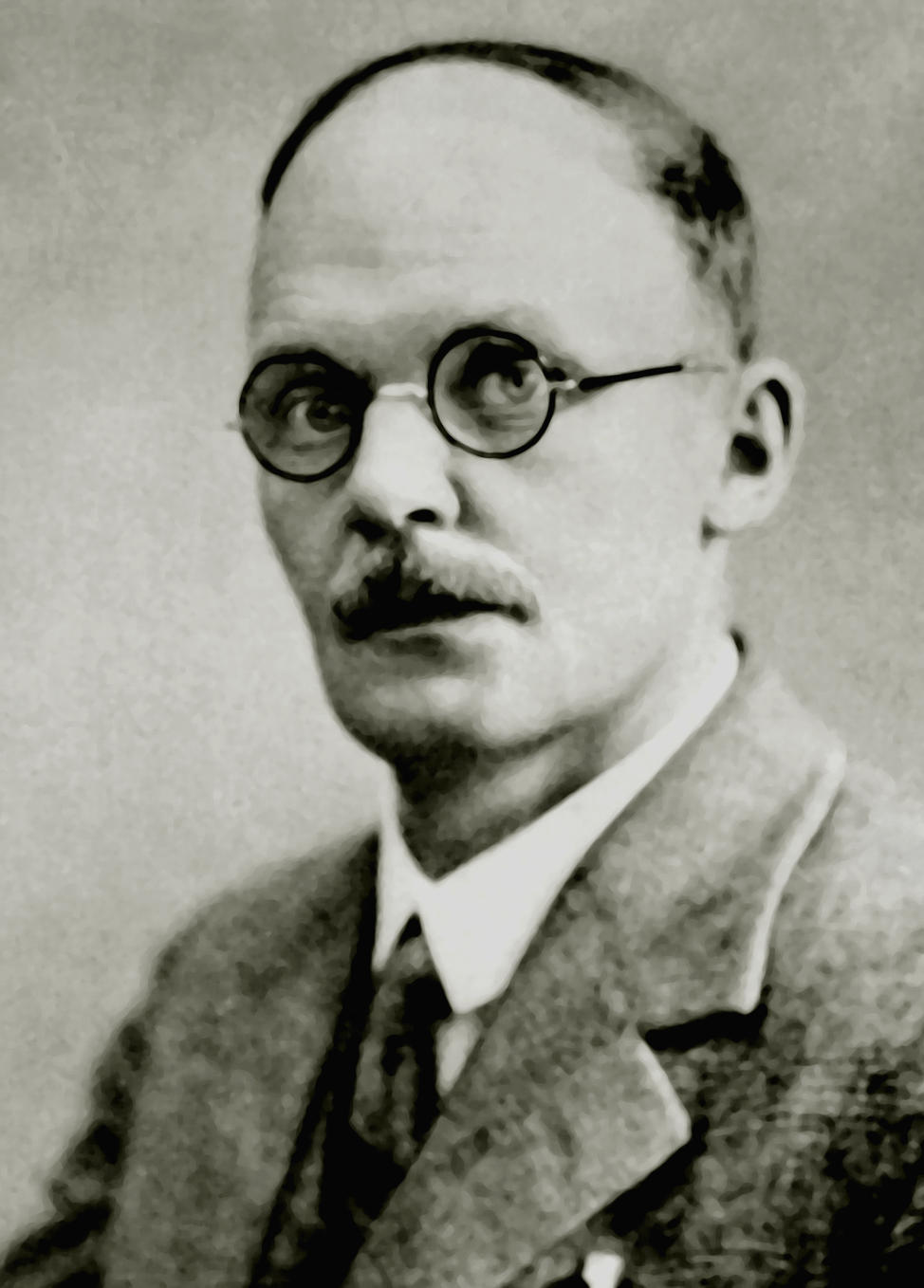
  Hans Geiger
- September 22 – Wilhelm Keitel, German field marshal (d. 1946)
- September 29 – Lilias Armstrong, English phonetician (d. 1937)
- September 30
  - George Bancroft, American film actor (d. 1956)
  - Hans Geiger, German physicist (d. 1945)

=== October ===
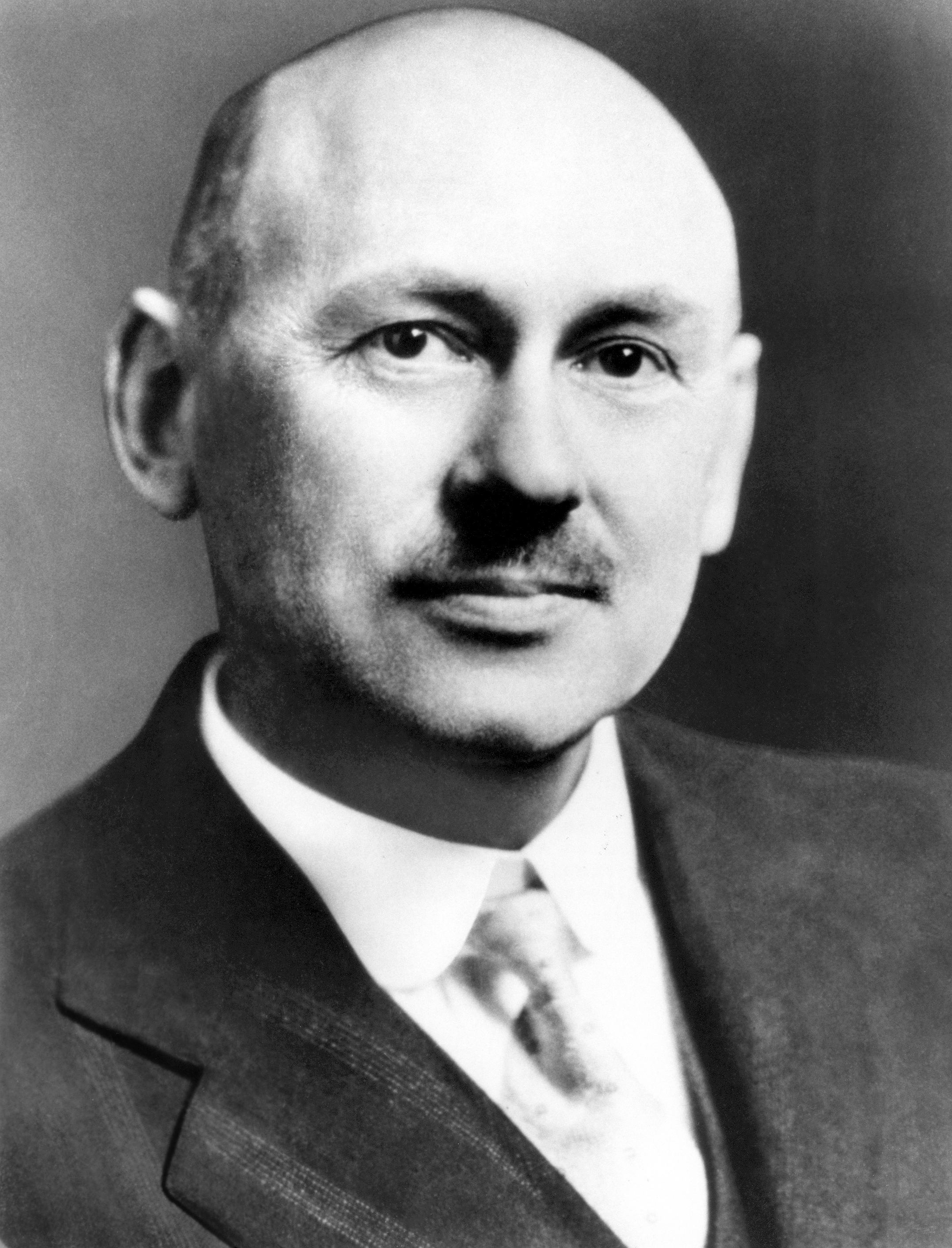
Robert H. Goddard

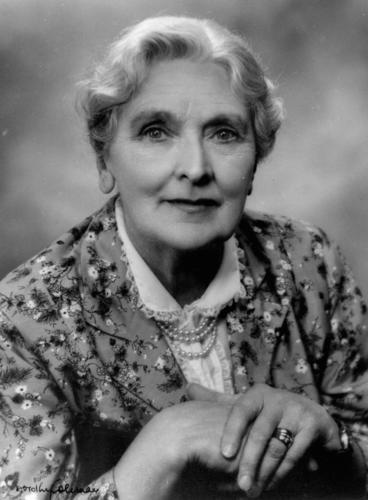
Sybil Thorndike

- October 2 – Boris Shaposhnikov, Soviet military leader, Marshal of the Soviet Union (d. 1945)
- October 3 – A. Y. Jackson, Canadian painter (d. 1974)
- October 5 – Robert H. Goddard, American rocket scientist (d. 1945)
- October 6 – Karol Szymanowski, Polish composer (d. 1937)
- October 8 – Harry McClintock, American singer (d. 1957)
- October 14
  - Zbigniew Dunin-Wasowicz, Polish military leader (d. 1915)
  - Éamon de Valera, Taoiseach and third President of Ireland (d. 1975)
  - Charlie Parker, English cricketer (d. 1959)
- October 17 – Giulio Gavotti, Italian aviator (d. 1939)
- October 20 – Bela Lugosi, Hungarian-born American actor (d. 1956)
- October 24 – Sybil Thorndike, British stage, film actress (d. 1976)
- October 25
  - Florence Easton, English opera soprano (d. 1955)
  - Tony Jackson, American jazz musician (d. 1921)
- October 30
  - William Halsey Jr., American admiral (d. 1959)
  - Günther von Kluge, German field marshal (d. 1944)

=== November ===
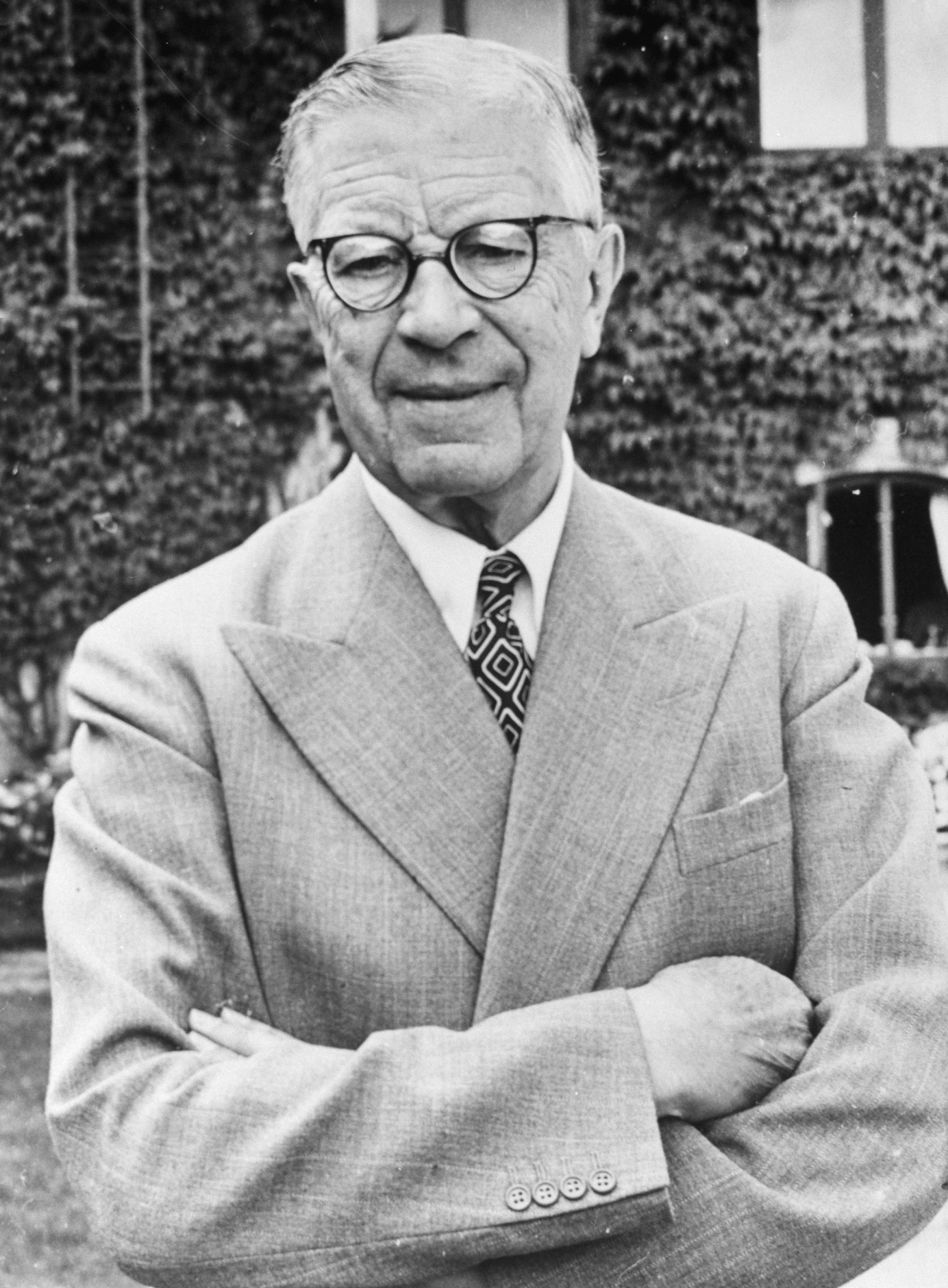
King Gustaf VI Adolf of Sweden

- November 6 – Feng Yuxiang, Chinese warlord and general (d. 1948)
- November 8 – Ethel Clayton, American silent screen star (d. 1966)
- November 11
  - T. F. O'Rahilly, Irish academic (d. 1953)
  - King Gustaf VI Adolf of Sweden (d. 1973)
- November 15 – Felix Frankfurter, Associate Justice of the Supreme Court of the United States (d. 1965)
- November 18
  - Jacques Maritain, French Catholic philosopher (d. 1973)
  - Frances Gertrude McGill, Canadian forensic pathologist (d. 1959)
- November 21 – Harold Lowe, Welsh 5th Officer of RMS Titanic (d. 1944)
- November 27 – Leonie von Meusebach–Zesch, American dentist (d. 1944)
- November 29 – Henri Fabre, French inventor of the first seaplane, the Fabre Hydravion (d. 1984)

=== December ===
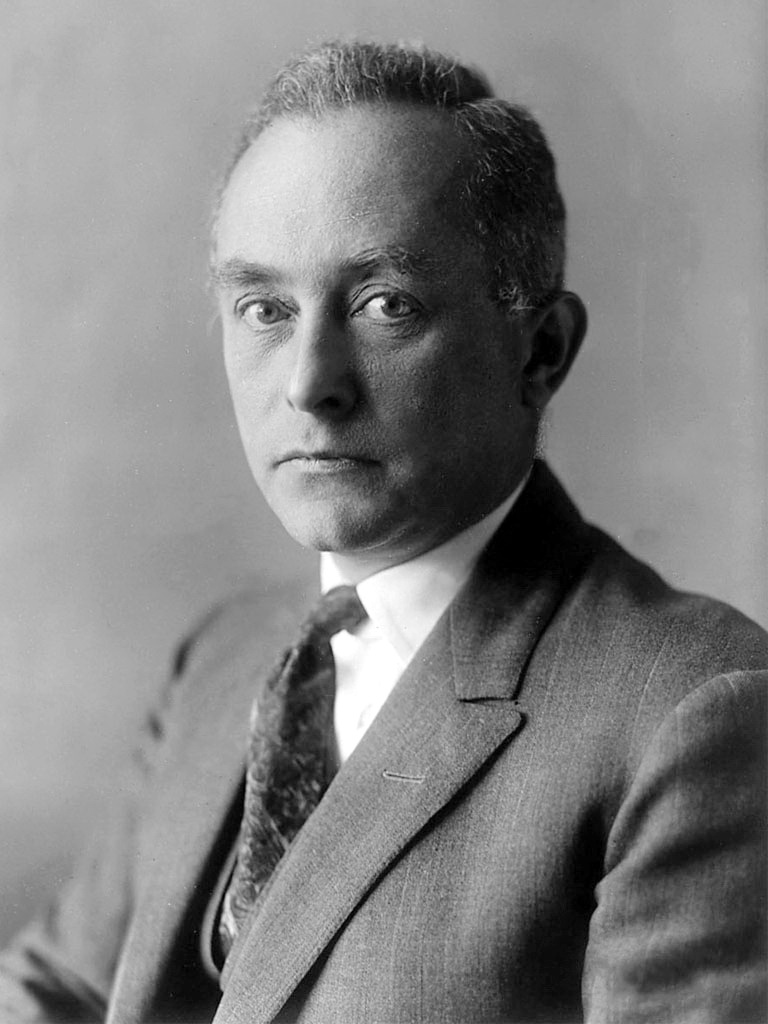
Max Born

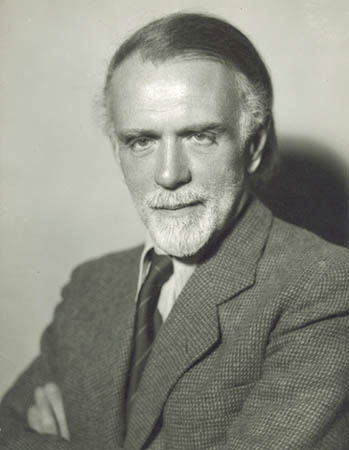
Zoltán Kodály

- December 9
  - Percy C. Mather, English Protestant missionary (d. 1933)
  - Joaquín Turina, Spanish composer (d. 1949)
- December 11
  - Subramania Bharati, Tamil Indian poet (d. 1921)
  - Max Born, German physicist, Nobel Prize laureate (d. 1970)
- December 12 – Ioannis Demestichas, Greek admiral (d. 1960)
- December 16
  - Jack Hobbs, English cricketer (d. 1963)
  - Zoltán Kodály, Hungarian composer (d. 1967)
  - Walther Meissner, German technical physicist (d. 1974)
- December 18 – Richard Maury, American naturalized Argentine engineer (d. 1950)
- December 22 – Hisao Tani, Japanese general and war criminal (d. 1947)
- December 23 – Mokichi Okada, Japanese religious leader (d. 1955)
- December 24 – Georges Legagneux, French aviator (d. 1914)
- December 28 – Arthur Eddington, English astronomer, astrophysicist and mathematician (d. 1944)
- December 29 – Raymond Stanton Patton, American admiral, engineer and second Director of the United States Coast and Geodetic Survey (d. 1937)

=== Date unknown ===
- Sediqeh Dowlatabadi, Persian feminist, women's rights activist and journalist (d. 1961)
- Nellie Yu Roung Ling, Chinese dancer, lady-in-waiting in Qing imperial court (d. 1973)
- T. Sathasiva Iyer, Ceylon Tamil scholar, Tamil language writer (d. 1950)
- Ioryi Mucitano, Aromanian revolutionary (d. 1911)
- Nicolae Velo, Aromanian poet and diplomat in Romania (d. 1924)

1883

=== January–February ===
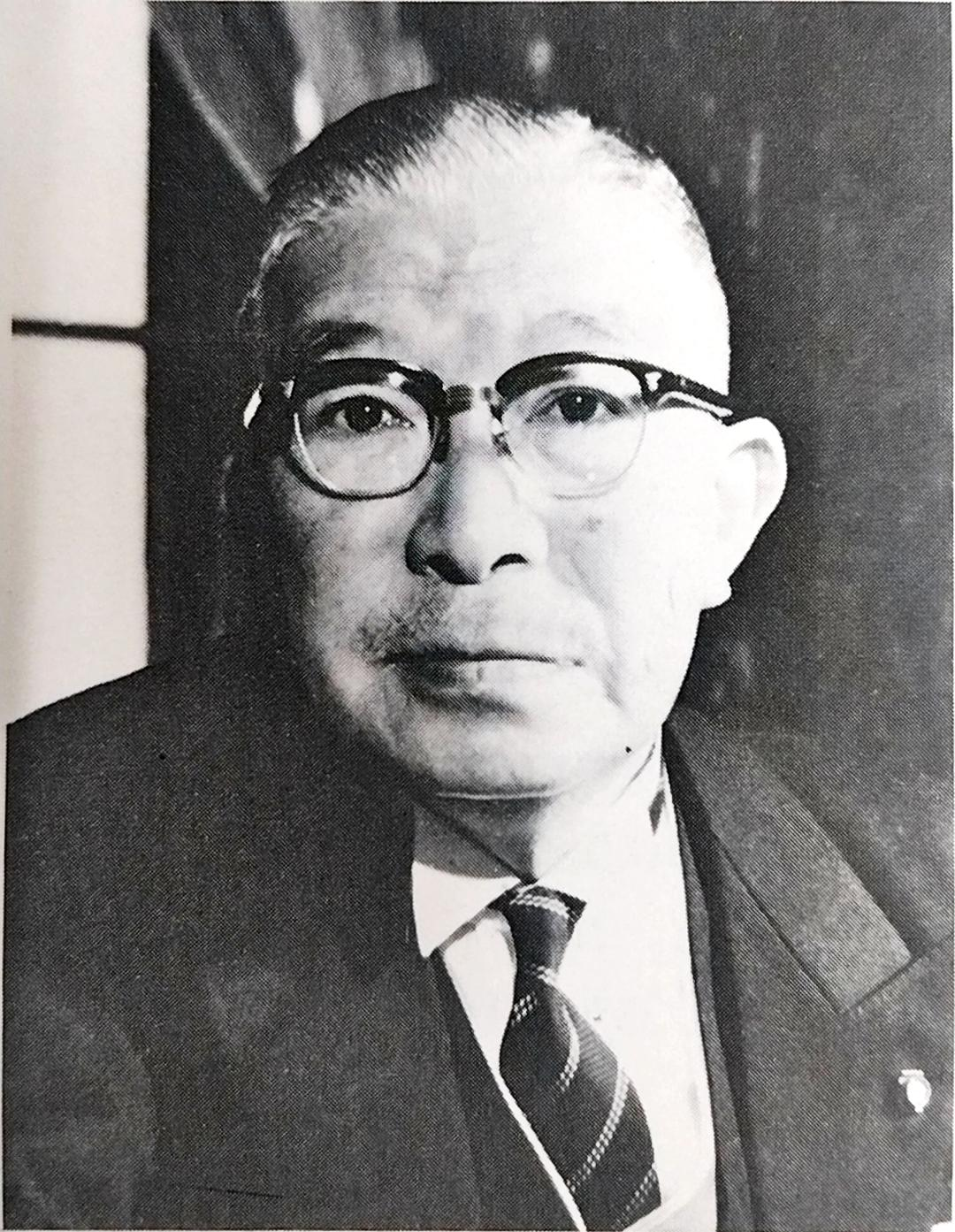
Ichirō Hatoyama

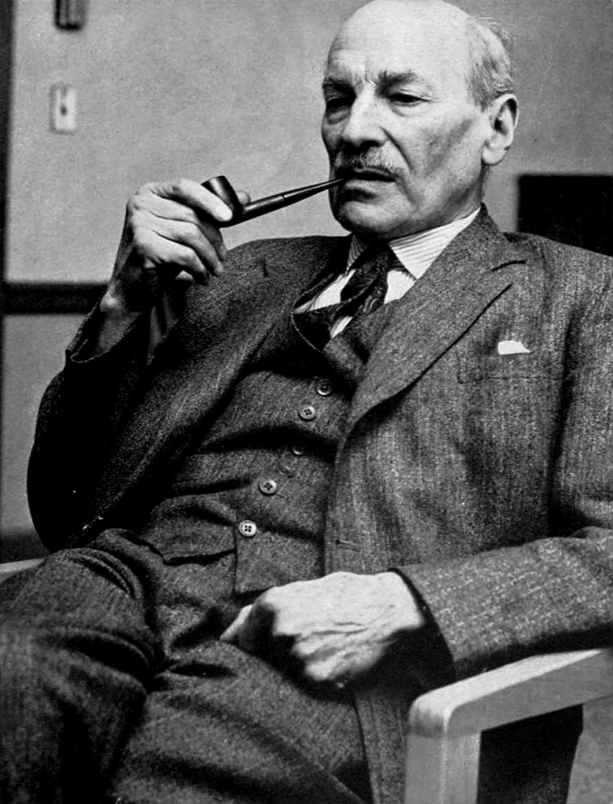
Clement Attlee

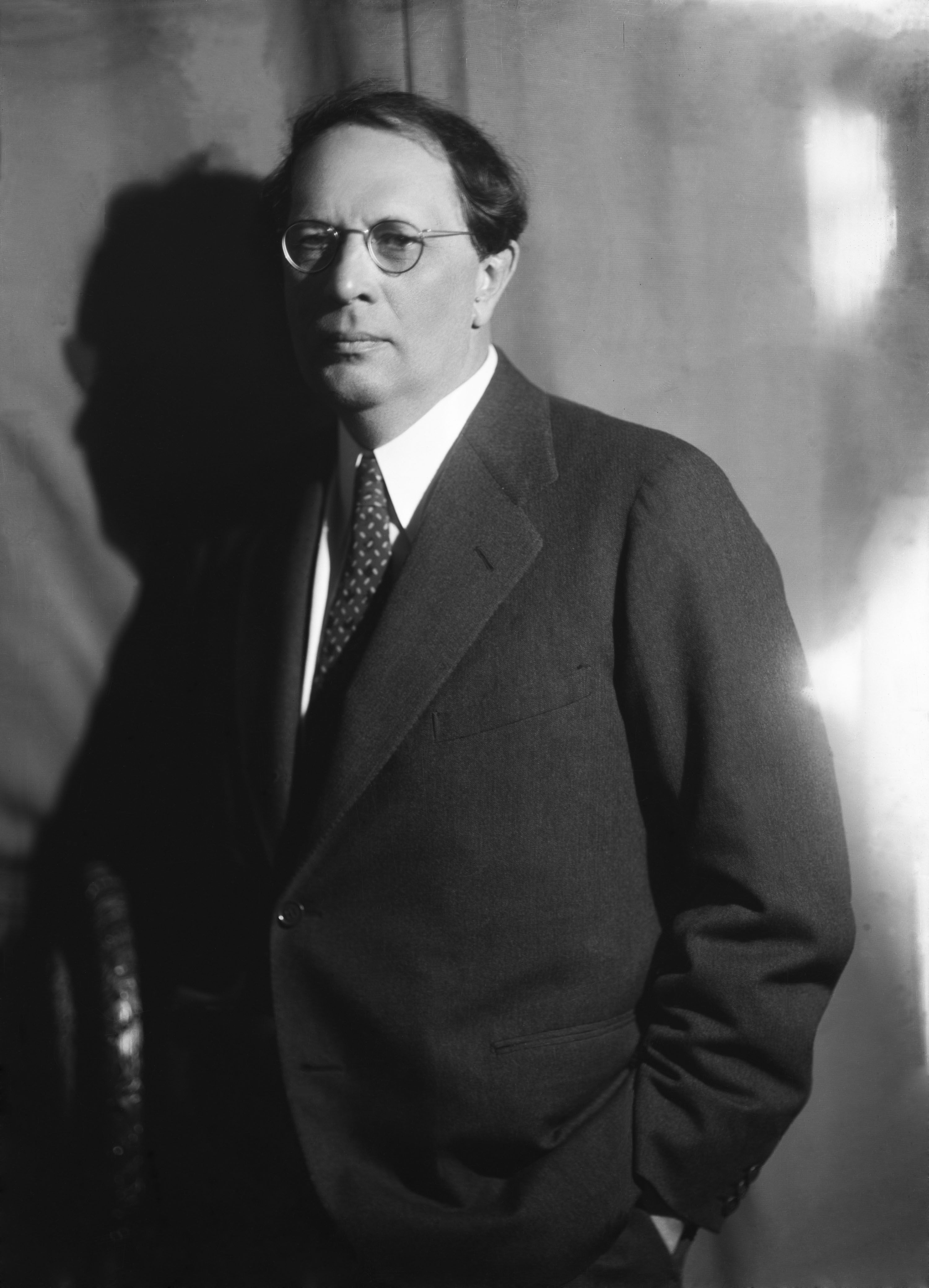
Aleksei Nikolaevich Tolstoy

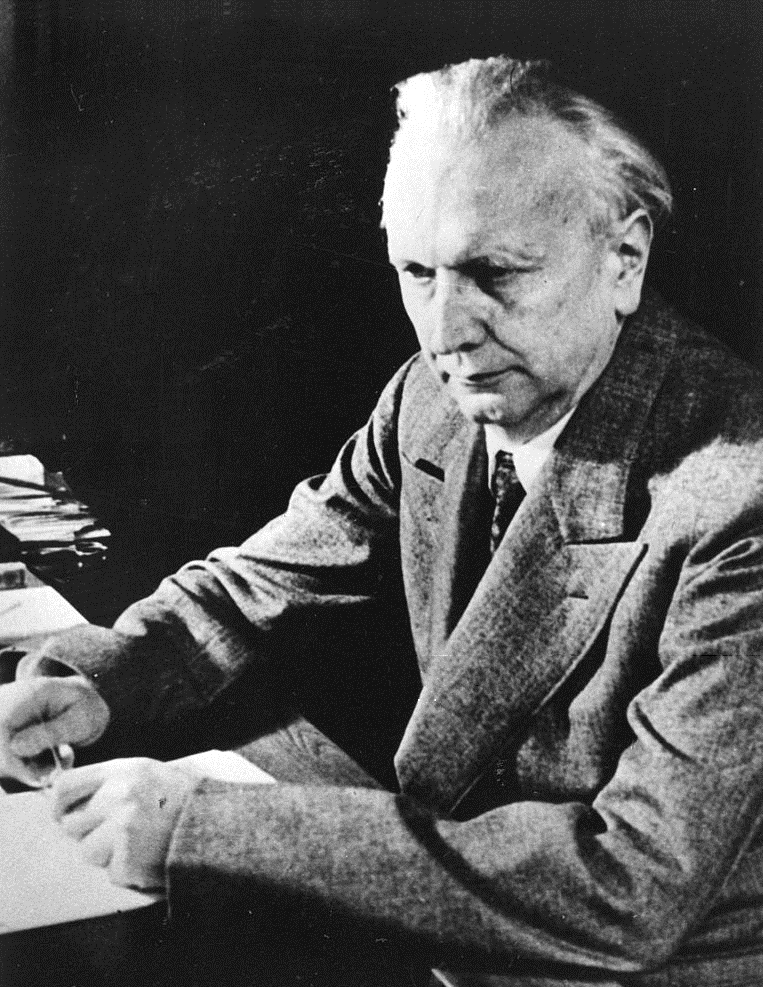
Karl Jaspers

- January 1 – Ichirō Hatoyama, Prime Minister of Japan (d. 1959)
- January 3 – Clement Attlee, Prime Minister of the United Kingdom (d. 1967)
- January 4 – Johanna Westerdijk, Dutch plant pathologist (d. 1961)
- January 5 – Döme Sztójay, Prime Minister of Hungary (d. 1946)
- January 6 – Kahlil Gibran, Lebanese poet, painter and novelist (d. 1931)
- January 10
  - Francis X. Bushman, American screen actor (d. 1966)
  - Hubert Latham, pioneer French aviator of the pre-World War I era (d. 1912)
  - Florence Reed, American actress (d. 1967)
  - Helen Lackaye, American stage actress (d. 1940)
  - Aleksei Nikolaevich Tolstoy, Russian writer (d. 1945)
- January 16 – Oswald Short, English aircraft manufacturer (d. 1969)
- January 19 – Waite Phillips, American businessman, philanthropist (d. 1964)
- January 20 – Bertram Ramsay, British admiral (d. 1945)
- February 8 – Joseph Schumpeter, Austrian economist (d. 1950)
- February 15 – Sax Rohmer, English author (d. 1959)
- February 16 – Koshirō Oikawa, Japanese admiral (d. 1958)
- February 22
  - Abe Attell, American boxer (d. 1970)
  - Marguerite Clark, American silent film actress (d. 1940)
- February 23 – Karl Jaspers, German philosopher (d. 1969)
- February 28 – Gheorghe Argeșanu, Romanian general and politician, 40th Prime Minister of Romania (d. 1940)

=== March–April ===
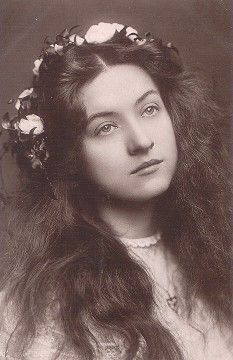
Maude Fealy

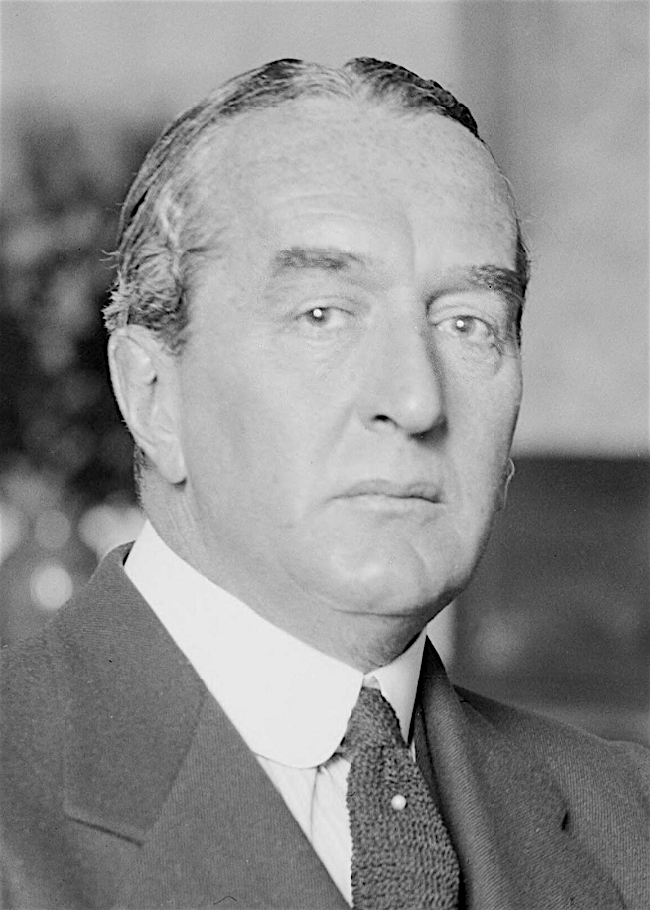
Stanley Bruce

- March 2 – Nikos Kazantzakis, Greek writer (d. 1957)
- March 3 – Cyril Burt, British educational psychologist (d. 1971)
- March 4
  - Sam Langford, Canadian boxer (d. 1956)
  - Maude Fealy, American actress (d. 1971)
- March 7 – Michael Somogyi, Hungarian-American biochemist (d. 1971)
- March 19
  - Norman Haworth, British chemist, Nobel Prize laureate (d. 1950)
  - Joseph Stilwell, American general (d. 1946)
- March 21 – Sam Hardy, American stage and screen actor (d. 1935)
- March 24 – Dorothy Campbell, Scottish golfer (d. 1945)
- March 28 – Tikiri Bandara Panabokke II, Ceylonese colonial-era legislator, lawyer and diplomat (d. 1963)
- April 1
  - Laurette Taylor, American actress (d. 1946)
  - Lon Chaney, American actor (d. 1930)
- April 3 – Henry Diesen, Norwegian admiral (d. 1953)
- April 5 – Walter Huston, Canadian-born American actor (d. 1950)
- April 11 – Leonard Mudie, English actor (d. 1965)
- April 12 – Dally Messenger, Australian rugby league player (d. 1959)
- April 15 – Stanley Bruce, 8th Prime Minister of Australia (d. 1967)
- April 25 – Semyon Budyonny, Cossack cavalryman, Marshal of the Soviet Union (d. 1973)
- April 30 – Jaroslav Hašek, Czech writer (d. 1923)

=== May–June ===
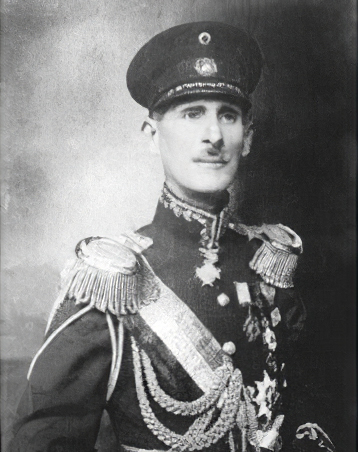
Eleazar López Contreras

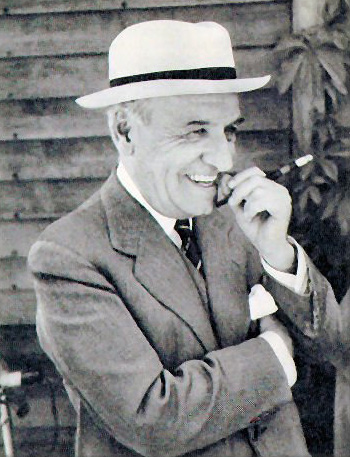
José Ortega y Gasset

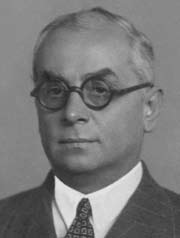
Celâl Bayar

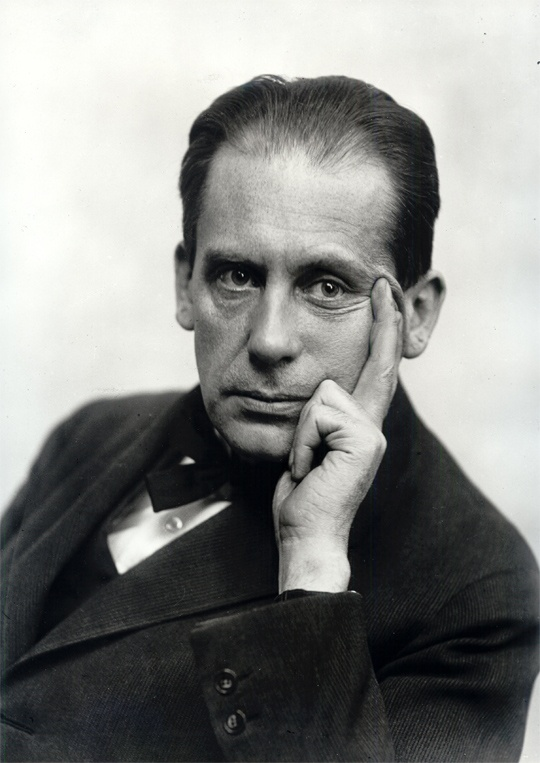
Walter Gropius

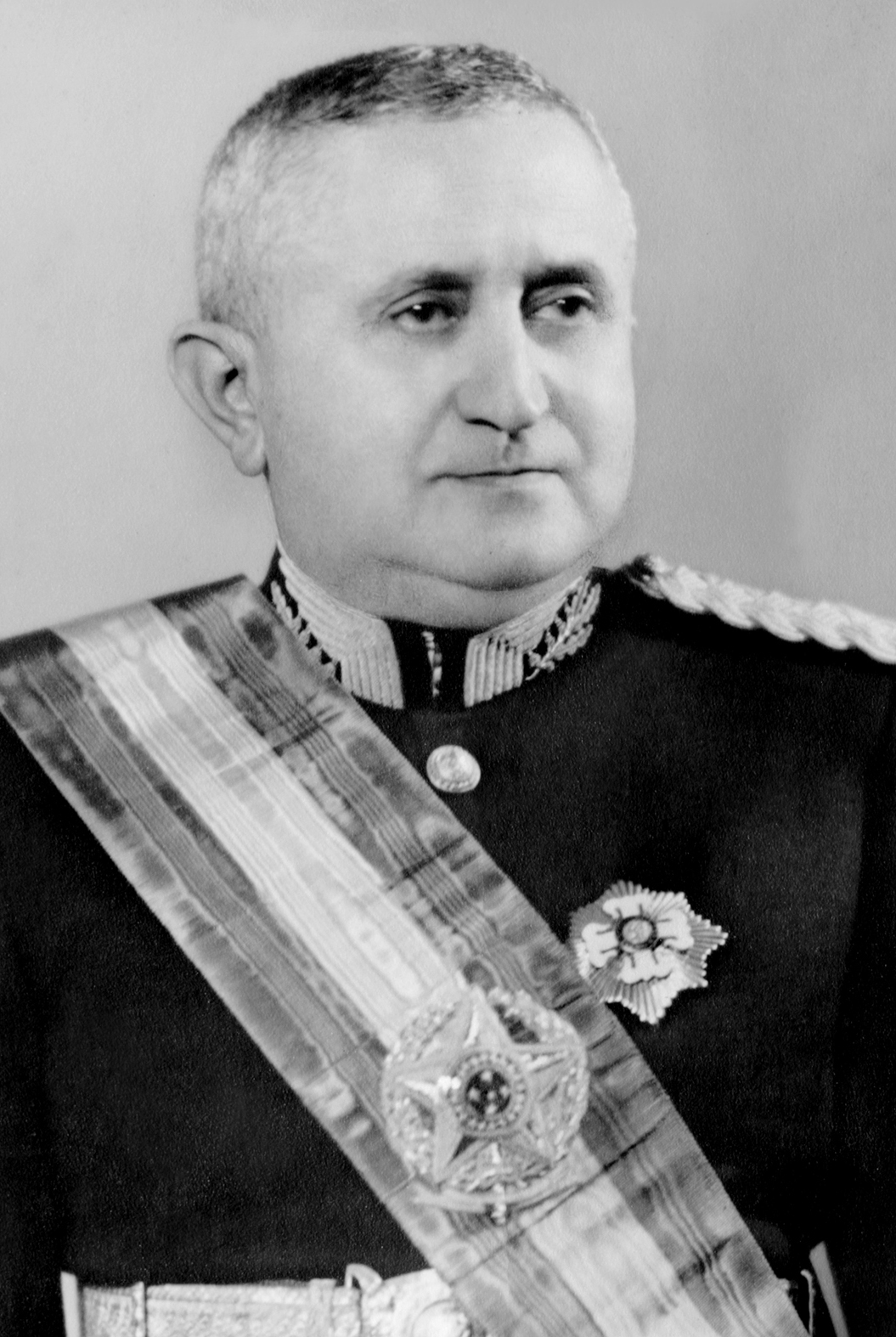
Eurico Gaspar Dutra

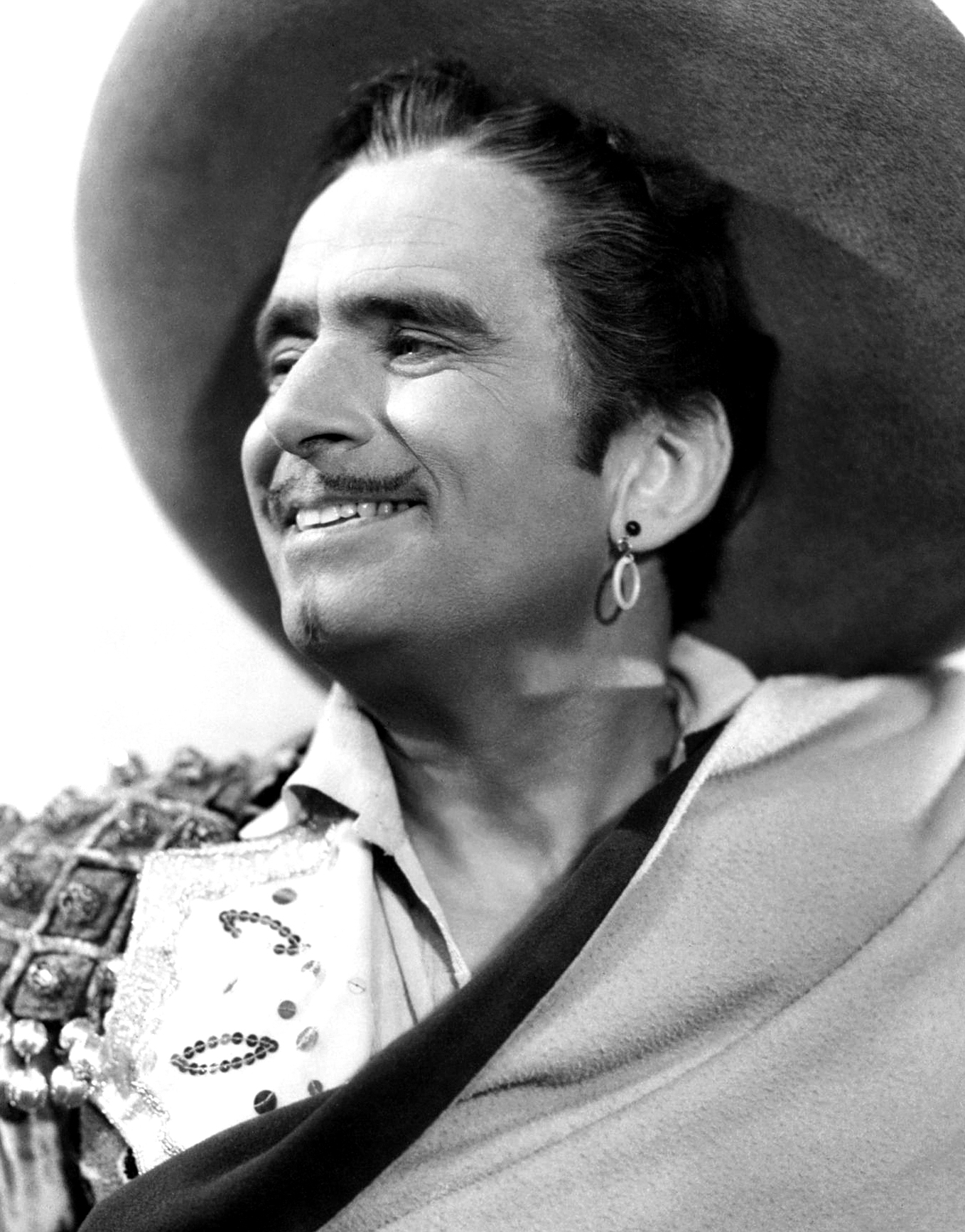
Douglas Fairbanks

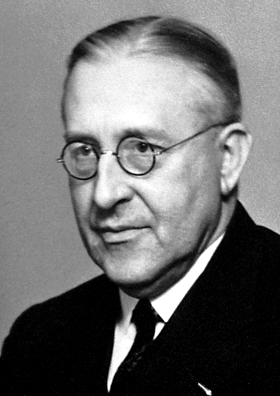
Victor Franz Hess

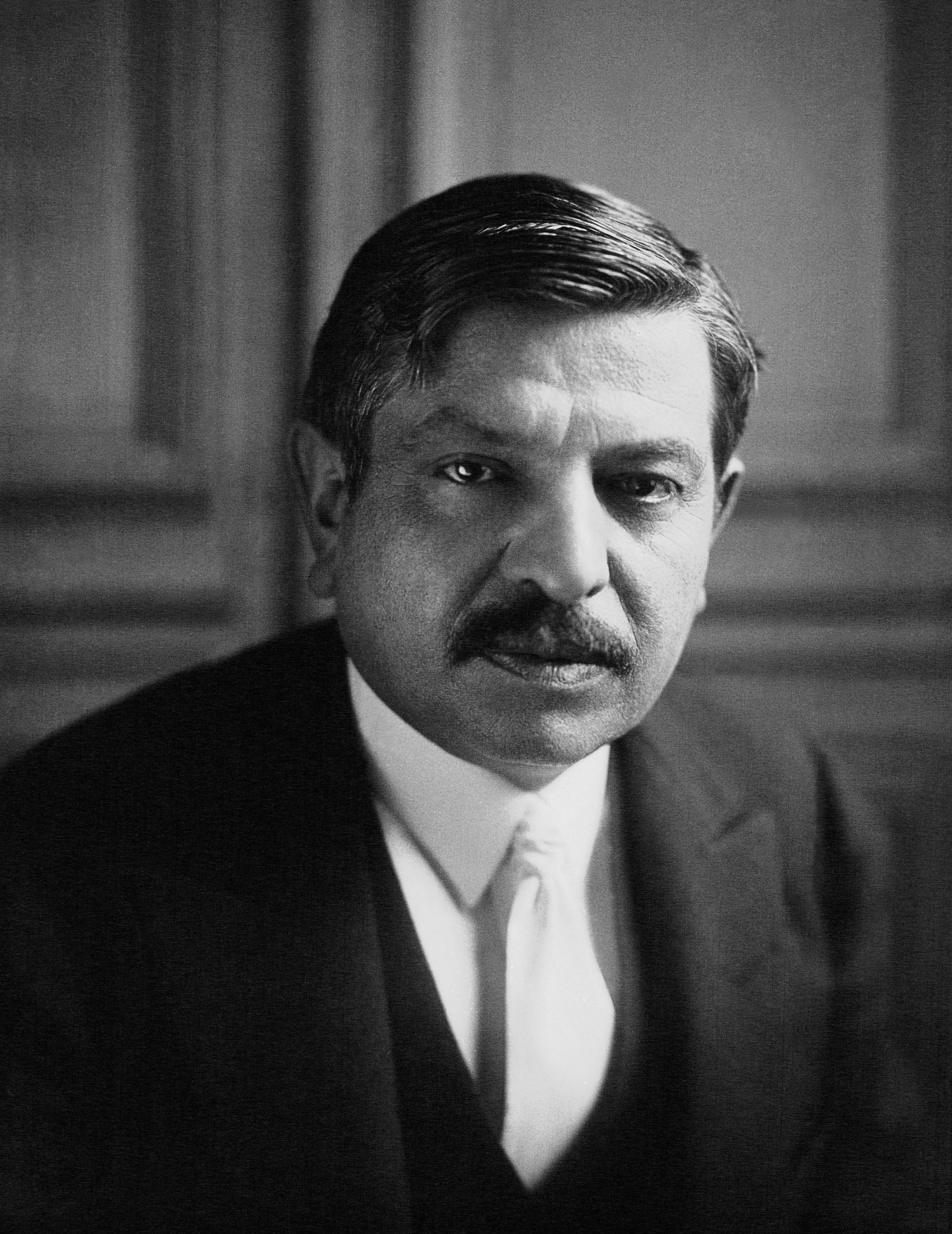
Pierre Laval

- May 1 – Tom Moore, Irish-American actor (d. 1955)
- May 5
  - Eleazar López Contreras, 32nd President of Venezuela (d. 1973)
  - Archibald Wavell, 1st Earl Wavell, British field marshal (d. 1950)
- May 9 – José Ortega y Gasset, Spanish philosopher (d. 1955)
- May 10 – Eugen Leviné, Communist leader of the Munich Soviet Republic (d. 1919)
- May 16
  - Celâl Bayar, Turkish politician, statesman, 3rd President of Turkey (d. 1986)
  - Solomone Ula Ata, Prime Minister of Tonga (d. 1950)
- May 18
  - Walter Gropius, German architect (d. 1969)
  - Hasui Kawase, Japanese painter, printmaker (d. 1957)
  - Eurico Gaspar Dutra, Brazilian marshal, 16th President of Brazil (d. 1974)
- May 23 – Douglas Fairbanks, American actor (d. 1939)
- May 24 – Elsa Maxwell, American gossip columnist, international party giver (d. 1963)
- May 25 – Lesley J. McNair, American general (d. 1944)
- May 27 – Jessie Arms Botke, American artist (d. 1971)
- May 28 – Vinayak Damodar Savarkar, Indian pro-independence activist, Hindu nationalist (d. 1966)
- May 31 – Lauri Kristian Relander, President of Finland (d. 1942)
- June 5
  - John Maynard Keynes, English economist (d. 1946)
  - Mary Helen Young, Scottish nurse and resistance fighter during World War II (died 1945)
- June 7 – Sylvanus Morley, American scholar, World War I spy (d. 1948)
- June 11 – Aubrey Fitch, American admiral (d. 1978)
- June 18 – Mary Alden, American stage, screen actress (d. 1946)
- June 20 – Royal E. Ingersoll, American admiral (d. 1976)
- June 24 – Victor Francis Hess, Austrian-born American physicist, Nobel Prize laureate (d. 1964)
- June 28 – Pierre Laval, Prime Minister of France (d. 1945)
- June 29 – Lothrop Stoddard, American eugenicist, radical scientific racist (d. 1950)

=== July–August ===
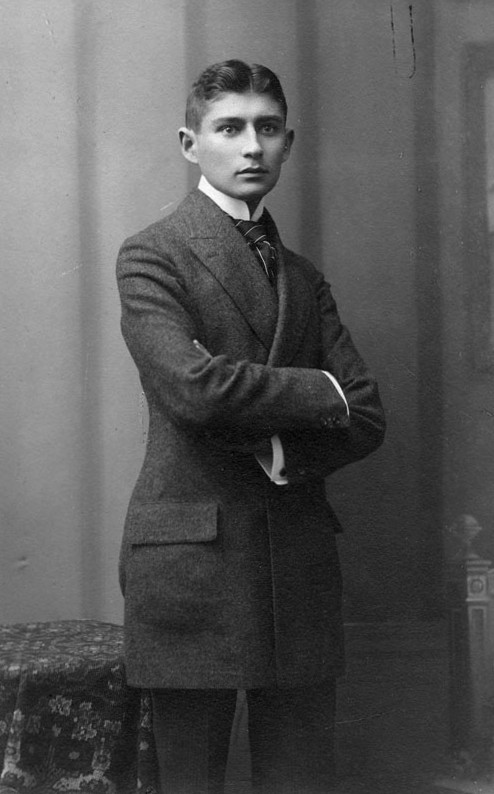
Franz Kafka

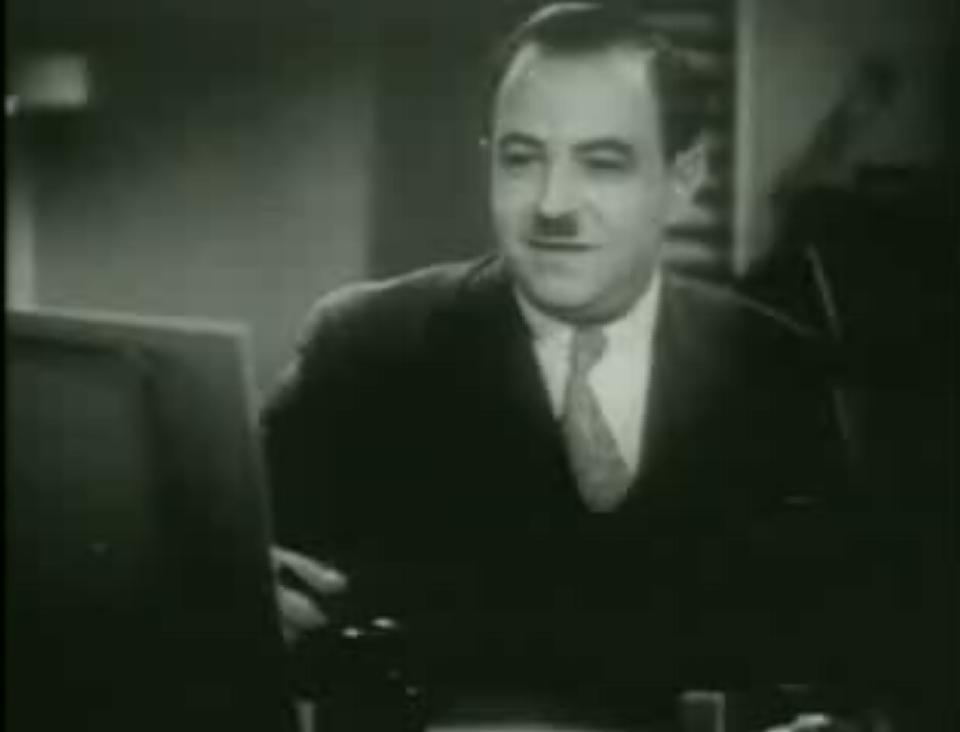
Max Fleischer

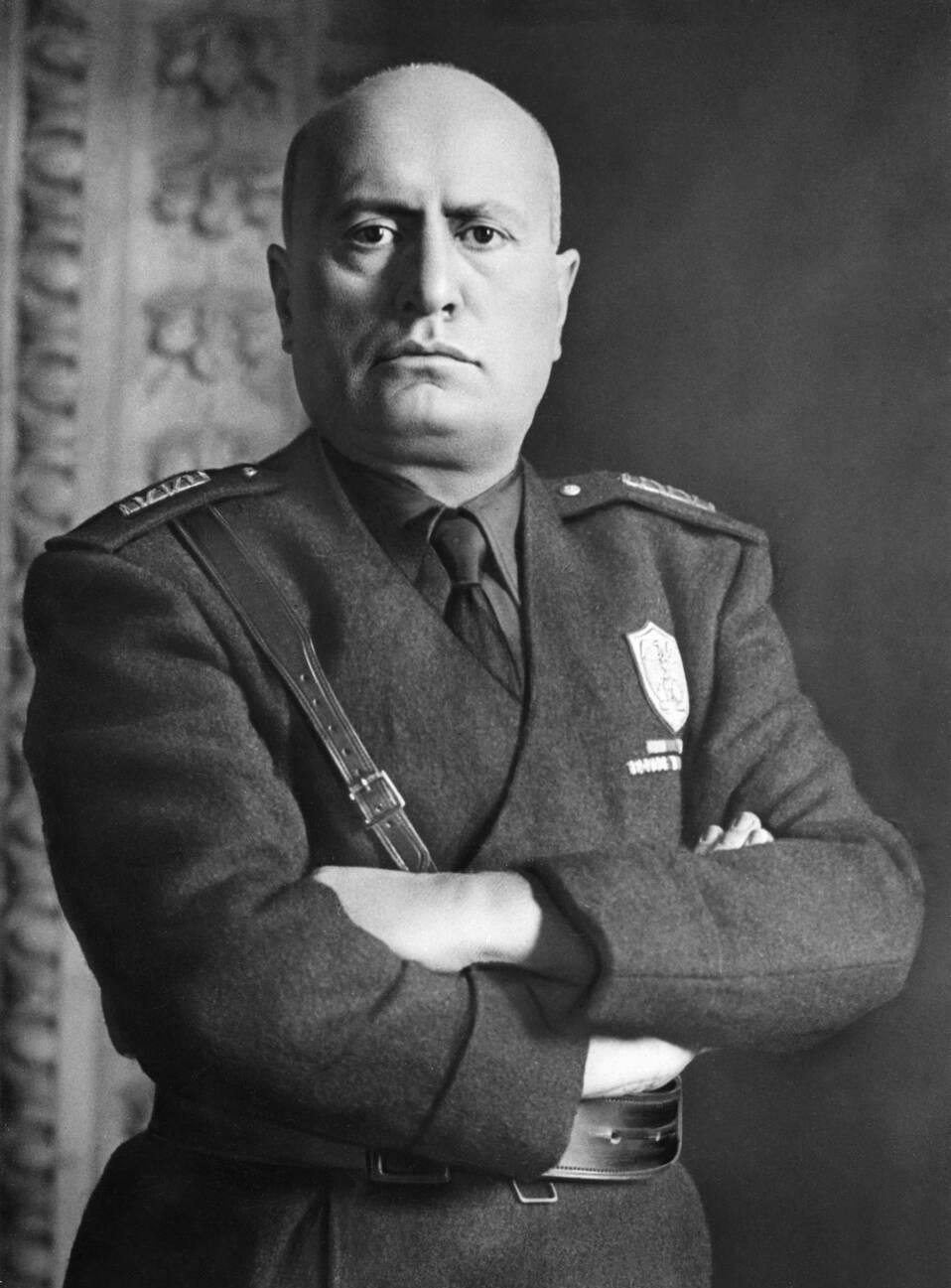
Benito Mussolini

Coco Chanel

- July 1 – István Friedrich, 24th Prime Minister of Hungary (d. 1951)
- July 3 – Franz Kafka, Austrian writer (d. 1924)
- July 4 – Rube Goldberg, American cartoonist (d. 1970)
- July 6 – Godfrey Huggins, English-born Rhodesian politician and physician, Prime Minister of Rhodesia (d. 1971)
- July 10 – Johannes Blaskowitz, German general (d. 1948)
- July 13 – Jack Reagan, American salesman (d. 1941)
- July 16 – Charles Sheeler, American photographer, artist (d. 1965)
- July 19
  - Max Fleischer, Austrian animator, film producer (Betty Boop) (d. 1972)
  - Beatrice Forbes, Countess of Granard, American-born heiress (d. 1972)
- July 20 – Catherine Bramwell-Booth, English Salvation Army officer (d. 1987)
- July 23
  - Alan Brooke, 1st Viscount Alanbrooke, British field marshal (d. 1963)
  - Ubaldo Soddu, Italian general (d. 1949)
  - Oscar Westover, United States Army Air Corps general (d. 1938)
- July 25 – Alfredo Casella, Italian composer (d. 1947)
- July 26 – Edwin Balmer, American science fiction, mystery writer (d. 1959)
- July 29
  - Henry Robertson Bowers, Scottish polar explorer (d. 1912)
  - Benito Mussolini, dictator of Italy (d. 1945)
- July 31 – Ramón Fonst, Cuban fencer (d. 1959)
- August 2 – Aurelio Mosquera, Ecuadorian politician, 25th President of Ecuador (d. 1939)
- August 6 – Scott Nearing, American political activist, economist, and simple living advocate (d. 1983)
- August 9 – Chester Gillette, American murderer (d. 1908)
- August 12
  - Pauline Frederick, American stage, screen actress (d. 1938)
  - Marion Lorne, American film, stage and television actress (d. 1968)
- August 15 – Ivan Meštrović, Croatian sculptor and architect (d. 1962)
- August 19
  - Coco Chanel, French fashion designer (d. 1971)
  - Elsie Ferguson, American actress (d. 1961)
  - José Mendes Cabeçadas, 9th President of Portugal and 94th Prime Minister of Portugal (d. 1965)
  - Axel Pehrsson-Bramstorp, 24th Prime Minister of Sweden (d. 1954)
- August 23
  - Jesse Pennington, English footballer (d. 1970)
  - Jonathan M. Wainwright, American general (d. 1953)
- August 30 – Theo van Doesburg, Dutch artist, painter, architect, and poet (d. 1931)

=== September–October ===
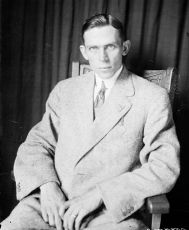
Mel Sheppard

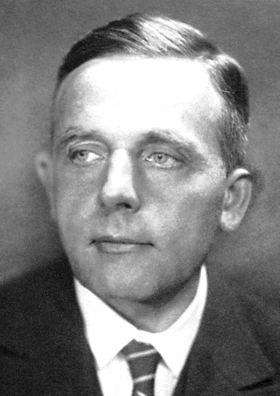
Otto Heinrich Warburg

- September 2 – Rudolf Weigl, Polish biologist (d. 1957)
- September 5 – Mel Sheppard, American Olympic athlete (d. 1942)
- September 13 – August Zaleski, 6th President of Poland (d. 1972)
- September 15 – Esteban Terradas i Illa, Catalan mathematician, scientist, and engineer (d. 1950)
- September 24 - Franklin Clarence Mars, American business magnate, founder of Mars Inc. (d. 1934)
- September 28 – Berta Pīpiņa, Latvian politician (d. 1942)
- October 2 – Karl von Terzaghi, Austrian civil engineer and "father of soil mechanics" (d. 1963)
- October 5 – Joseph Hubert Priestley, British botanist (d. 1944)
- October 8 – Otto Heinrich Warburg, German physician and physiologist, Nobel Prize laureate (d. 1970)
- October 15 – Robert L. Ghormley, American admiral (d. 1958)
- October 26 – Paul Pilgrim, American athlete (d. 1958)
- October 30 – Bob Jones Sr., American evangelist, religious broadcaster, and founder of Bob Jones University (d. 1968)
- October 31 – Anthony Wilding, New Zealand tennis player (d. 1915)

=== November–December ===
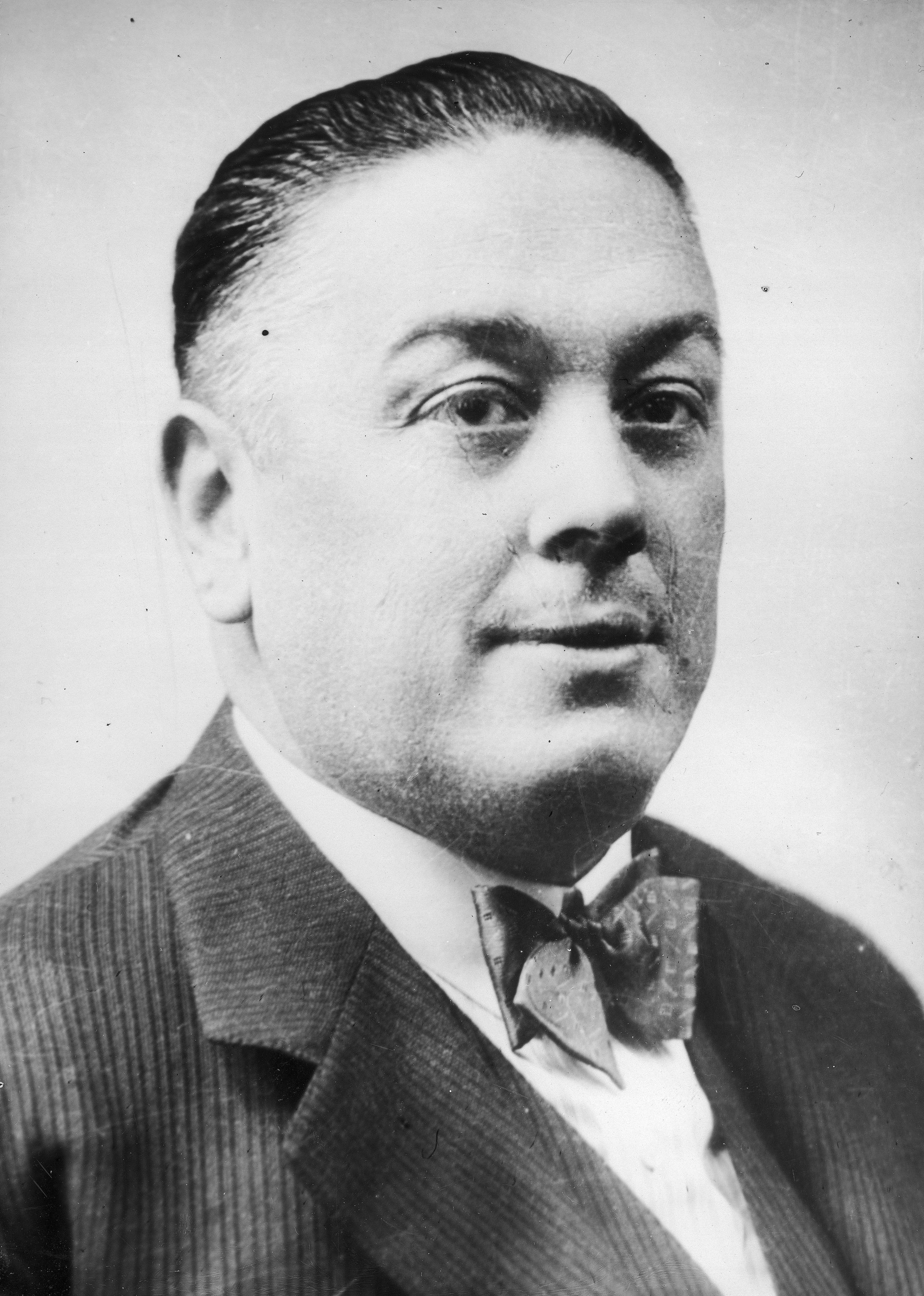
Diego Martínez Barrio

- November 4 – Nikolaos Plastiras, Greek general and politician (d. 1953)
- November 7 – Francisco Moreno Fernández, Spanish admiral (d. 1945)
- November 8 – Arnold Bax, English composer (d. 1953)
- November 9 – Edna May Oliver, American stage and film character actress (d. 1942)
- November 11 – Ernest Ansermet, Swiss conductor (d. 1969)
- November 14 – Ado Birk, 3rd Prime Minister of Estonia (d. 1942)
- November 18
  - Carl Vinson, U.S. congressman (d. 1981)
  - Alf Bjørnskau Bastiansen, Norwegian priest and politician (d. 1965)
- November 25
  - Harvey Spencer Lewis, American occultist (b. 1939)
  - Diego Martínez Barrio, Spanish politician, 2-time Prime Minister of Spain (d. 1962)
- November 26 – Belle da Costa Greene, American librarian, bibliographer, and archivist (d. 1950)
- November 29
  - Lev Galler, Soviet admiral (d. 1950)
  - Max Horton, British admiral (d. 1951)
- December 3 – Anton Webern, Austrian composer (d. 1945)
- December 9
  - Alexander Papagos, Prime Minister of Greece (d. 1955)
  - Joseph Pilates, German physical culturist and developer of Pilates (d. 1967)
- December 10 – Giovanni Messe, Italian field marshal and politician (d. 1968)
- December 12 – Maxey Dell Moody, American businessman and founder of M. D. Moody & Sons, Inc. (d. 1949)
- December 14 – Morihei Ueshiba, Japanese martial artist and founder of aikido (d. 1969)
- December 16 – Max Linder, French actor (d. 1925)
- December 22 – Edgard Varèse, French composer (d. 1965)
- December 25 – Hugo Bergmann, German and Israeli Jewish philosopher (d. 1975)
- December 26 – Maurice Utrillo, French artist and illustrator (d. 1955)
- December 28 – Lloyd Fredendall, American general (d. 1963)
- December 29 – Forrest Taylor, American stage, film and television actor (d. 1965)

=== Date unknown ===
- Lotte Herrlich, German photographer (d. 1956)
- Constantin Noe, Megleno-Romanian editor and professor (d. 1939)
- Ali Ahmad Khan, Afghan politician and emir (d. 1929)
- Ernest Spybuck, Native American artist (d. 1949)
- Trần Trọng Kim, Vietnamese historian and Prime Minister of the Empire of Vietnam (d. 1953)

1884

=== January ===
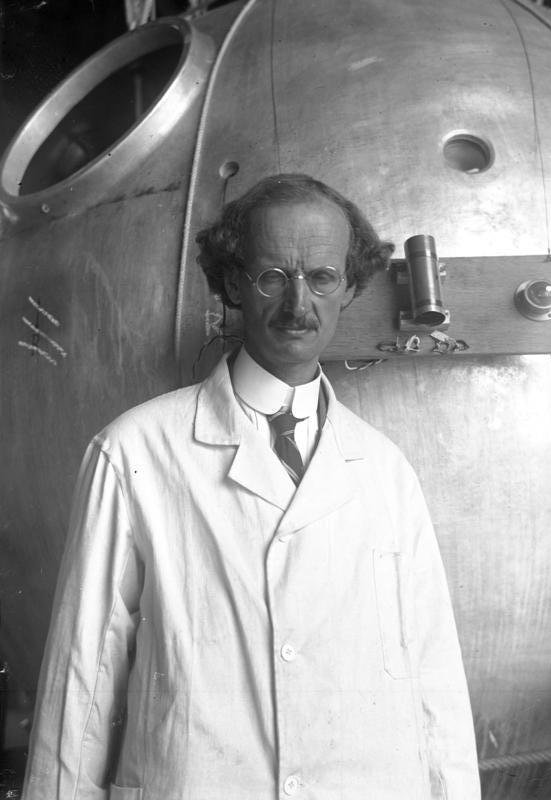
Auguste Piccard

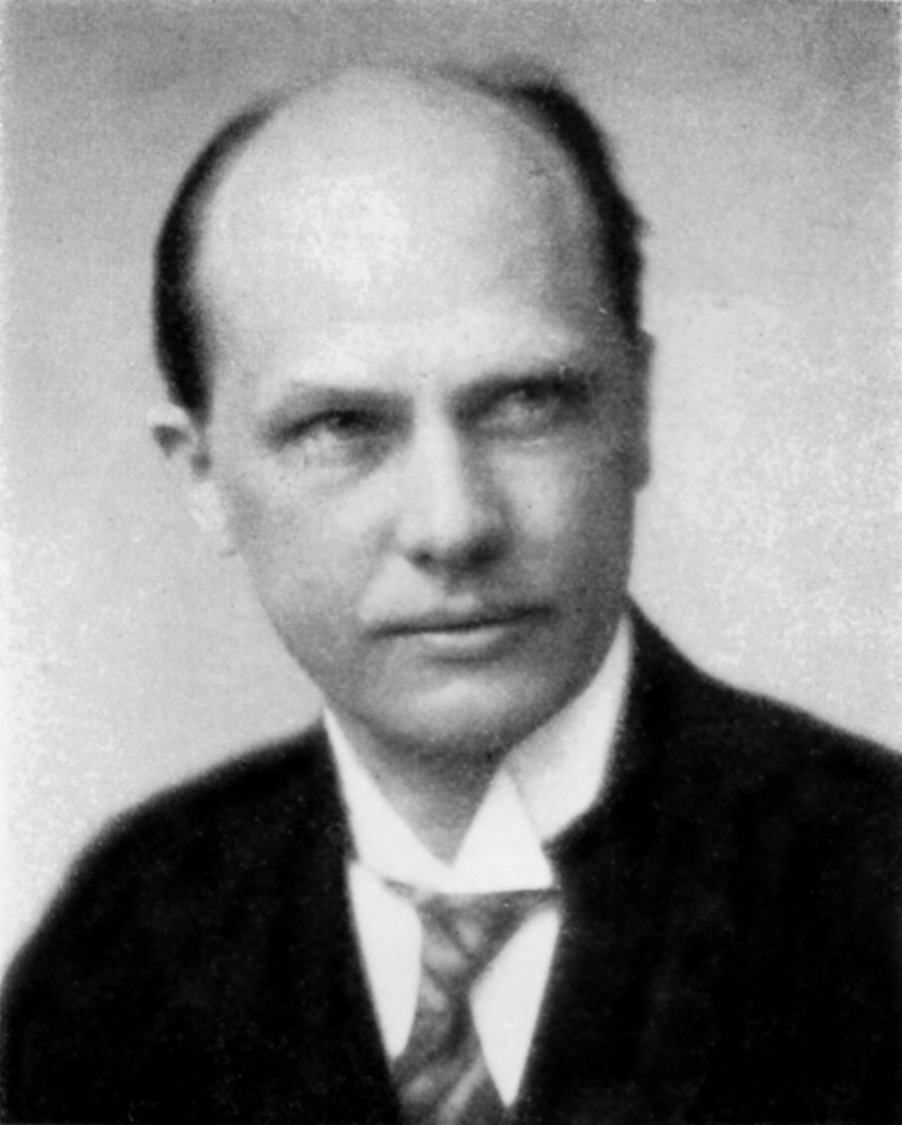
Rickard Sandler

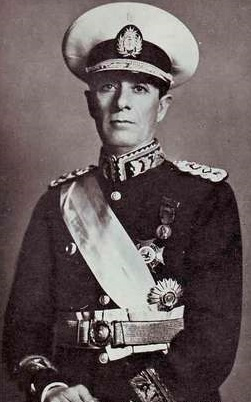
Pedro Pablo Ramírez

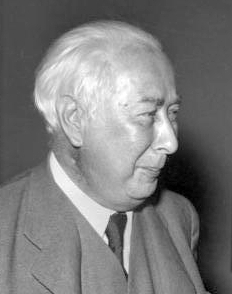
Theodor Heuss

- January 1
  - Chikuhei Nakajima, Japanese naval officer, engineer, and politician, founder of the Nakajima Aircraft Company (d. 1949)
  - Konstantinos Tsaldaris, Greek politician, 2-time prime minister of Greece (d. 1970)
- January 2 – Ben-Zion Dinur, Russian-born Israeli educator, historian and politician (d. 1973)
- January 12 – Texas Guinan, American vaudeville performer (d. 1933)
- January 16 – Hanns Kräly, Oscar-winning German screenwriter (d. 1950)
- January 20 – Charles W. Whittlesey, United States Army officer, commander of the Lost Battalion in World War I (d. 1921)
- January 21 – Roger Nash Baldwin, American social activist (d. 1981)
- January 23 – Ralph DePalma, Italian-born American race car driver (d. 1956)
- January 24 – Thomas Blamey, Australian field marshal (d. 1951)
- January 26
  - Gheorghe Avramescu, Romanian general (d. 1945)
  - Roy Chapman Andrews, American explorer, adventurer, and naturalist (d. 1960)
- January 28 – Auguste Piccard, Swiss physicist, balloonist, and inventor (d. 1962)
- January 29 – Rickard Sandler, 20th prime minister of Sweden (d. 1964)
- January 30
  - Sōjin Kamiyama, Japanese actor in American silent films,(d. 1954)
  - Pedro Pablo Ramírez, 26th president of Argentina, leader of World War II (d. 1962)
- January 31 – Theodor Heuss, German politician, 1st president of West Germany (d. 1963)

=== February ===
- February 1 – Bradbury Robinson, American football player, who threw the first forward pass in American football history (d. 1949)
- February 8 – Burt Mustin, American actor (d. 1977)
- February 12
  - Max Beckmann, German painter, graphic artist (d. 1950)
  - Marie Vassilieff, Russian artist (d. 1957)
  - Johan Laidoner, Estonian general and statesman (d.1953)
- February 13 – Alfred Carlton Gilbert, American athlete, inventor (d. 1961)
- February 15 – Mieczysław Norwid-Neugebauer, Polish general and politician (d. 1954)
- February 16 – Robert J. Flaherty, American filmmaker (d. 1951)
- February 17 – María Beatriz del Rosario Arroyo, Filipino Roman Catholic nun and servant of God (d. 1957)
- February 20 – Constantin Constantinescu-Claps, Romanian general (d. 1961)
- February 22 – Lew Cody, American actor (d. 1934)
- February 26 – John Cyril Porte, Irish-born British flying boat pioneer (d. 1919)
- February 28 – Ants Piip, Prime Minister of Estonia (d. 1942)

=== March ===
- March 11 – Ömer Seyfettin, Turkish writer (d. 1920)
- March 13 – Sir Hugh Walpole, English novelist (d. 1941)
- March 21 – George David Birkhoff, American mathematician (d. 1944)
- March 23 – Joseph Boxhall, RMS Titanic officer and survivor (d. 1967)
- March 24 – Peter Debye, Dutch chemist, Nobel Prize laureate (d. 1966)
- March 25 – Georges Imbert, Alsatian chemist (d. 1950)
- March 26
  - Wilhelm Backhaus, German pianist (d. 1969)
  - Isaac C. Kidd, American admiral (d. 1941)
- March 27 – James Cruze, American motion picture director (d. 1942)

=== April ===
- April 4 – Isoroku Yamamoto, Japanese admiral (d. 1943)
- April 5 – Ion Inculeț, President of Moldova (d. 1940)
- April 7 – Bronisław Malinowski, Polish anthropologist (d. 1942)
- April 12 – Otto Fritz Meyerhof, German-born physician, biochemist, and recipient of the Nobel Prize in Physiology or Medicine (d. 1951)
- April 17 – Fay Tincher, American comic actress (d. 1983)
- April 20 – Oliver Kirk, American Olympic boxer (d. 1960)
- April 22 – Tenby Davies, Welsh half-mile world champion runner (d. 1932)
- April 24 – Otto Froitzheim, German tennis player (d. 1962)

=== May ===
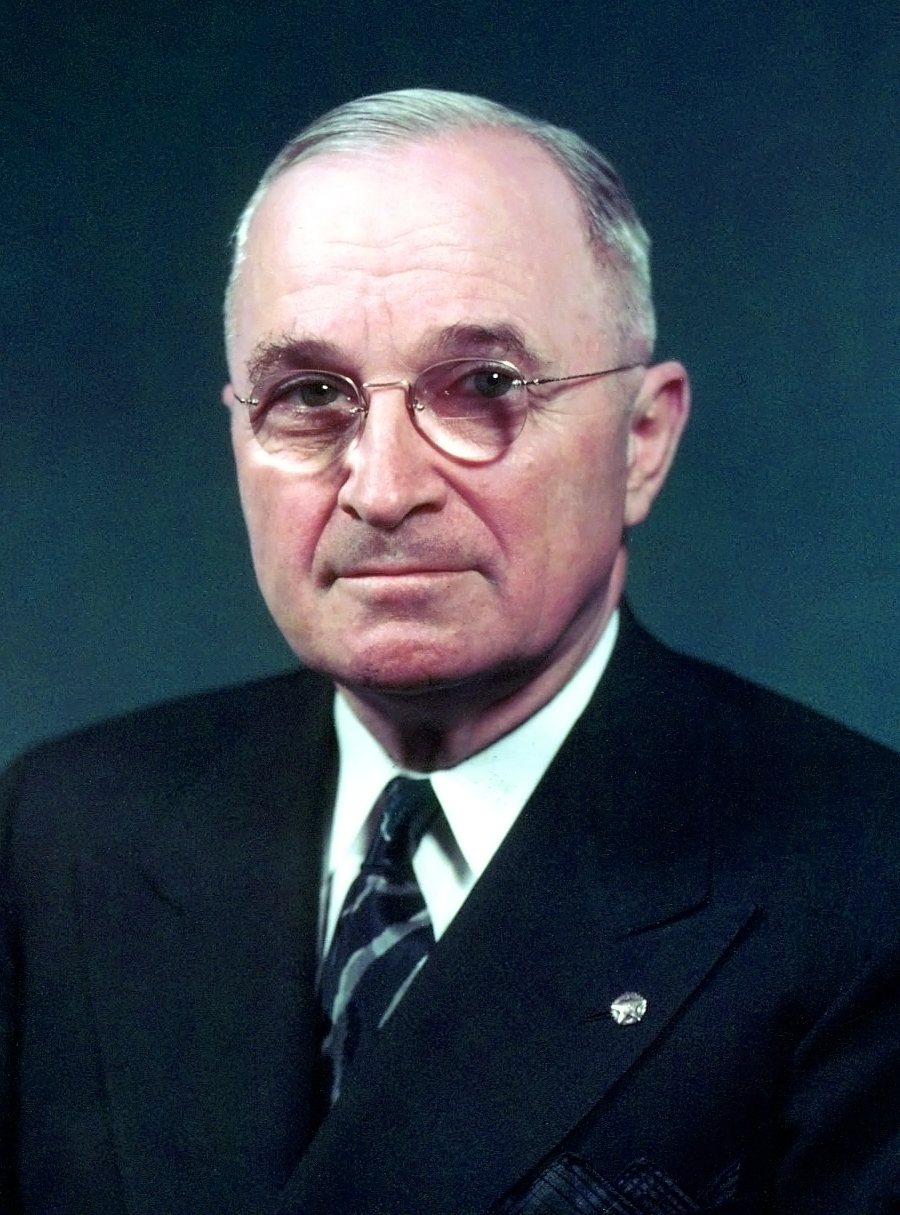
Harry S. Truman

- May 2 – John Boland, American politician (d. 1958)
- May 5 – Jean Decoux, French admiral, Governor-General of French Indochina (1940–1945) (d. 1963)
- May 8 – Harry S. Truman, 33rd president of the United States (d. 1972)
- May 10 – Olga Petrova, English-born American actress (d. 1977)
- May 14 – Claude Dornier, German aircraft designer (d. 1969)
- May 20 – Leon Schlesinger, American producer, filmmaker (d. 1949)
- May 22 – Cordelia Camp, American educator (d. 1973)
- May 23 – Corrado Gini, Italian statistician, demographer and sociologist (d. 1965)
- May 27 – Max Brod, Austrian author (d. 1968)
- May 28 – Edvard Beneš, Czechoslovak politician, prime minister and president of Czechoslovakia (d. 1948)
- May 30 – Robert Alfred Theobald, American admiral (d. 1957)

=== June ===
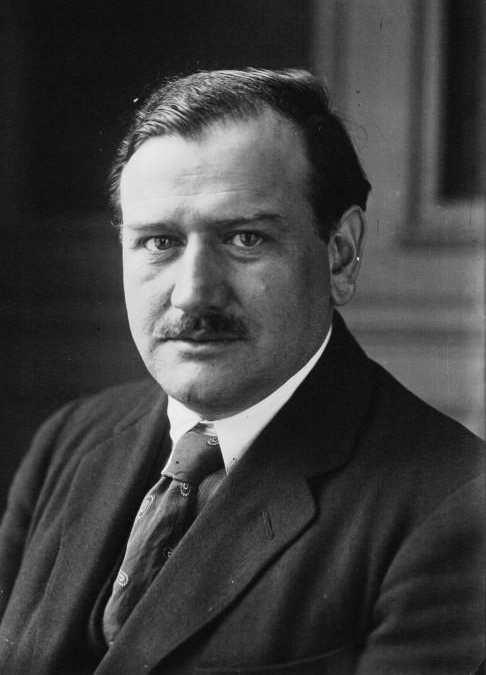
Édouard Daladier

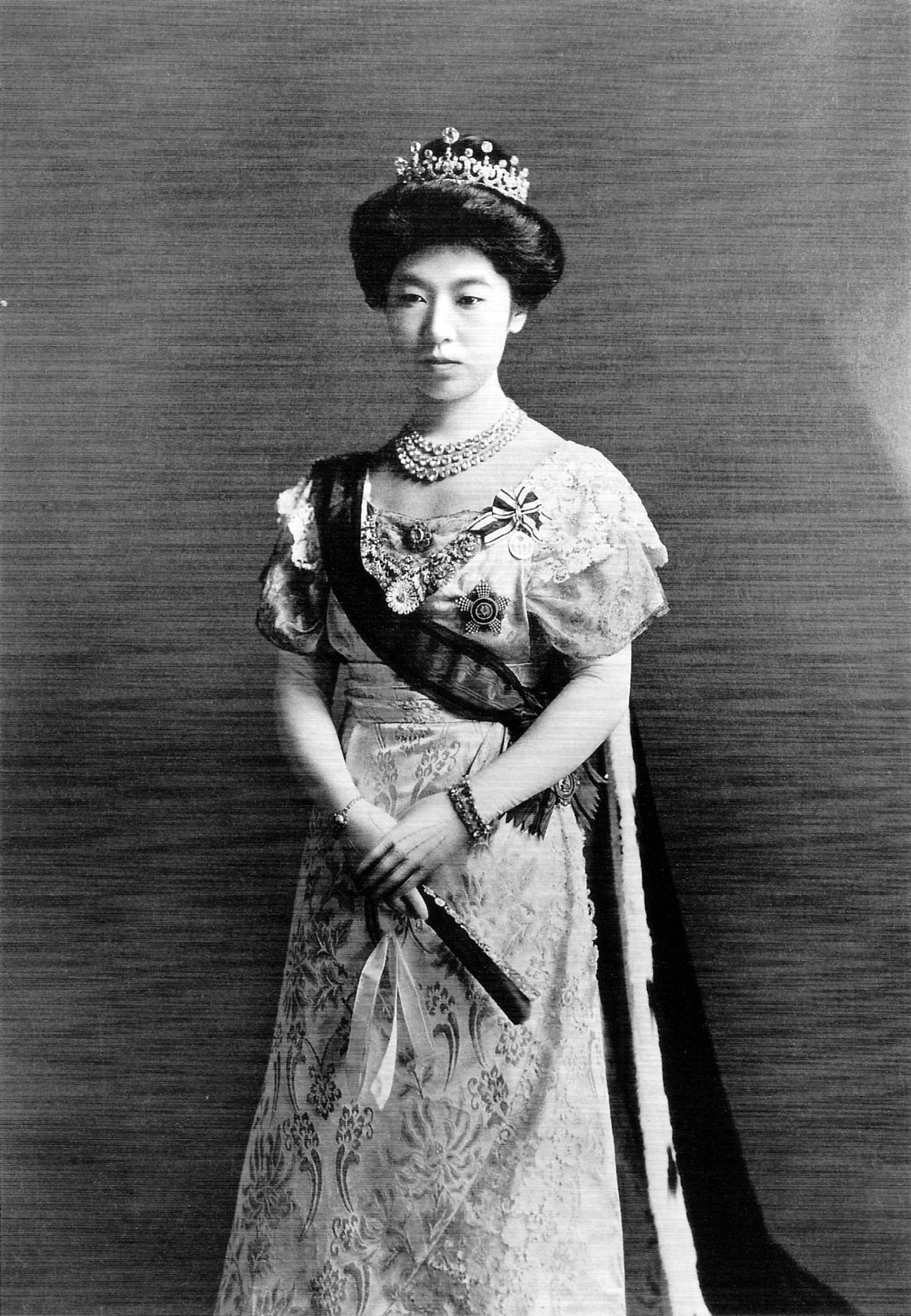
Empress Teimei

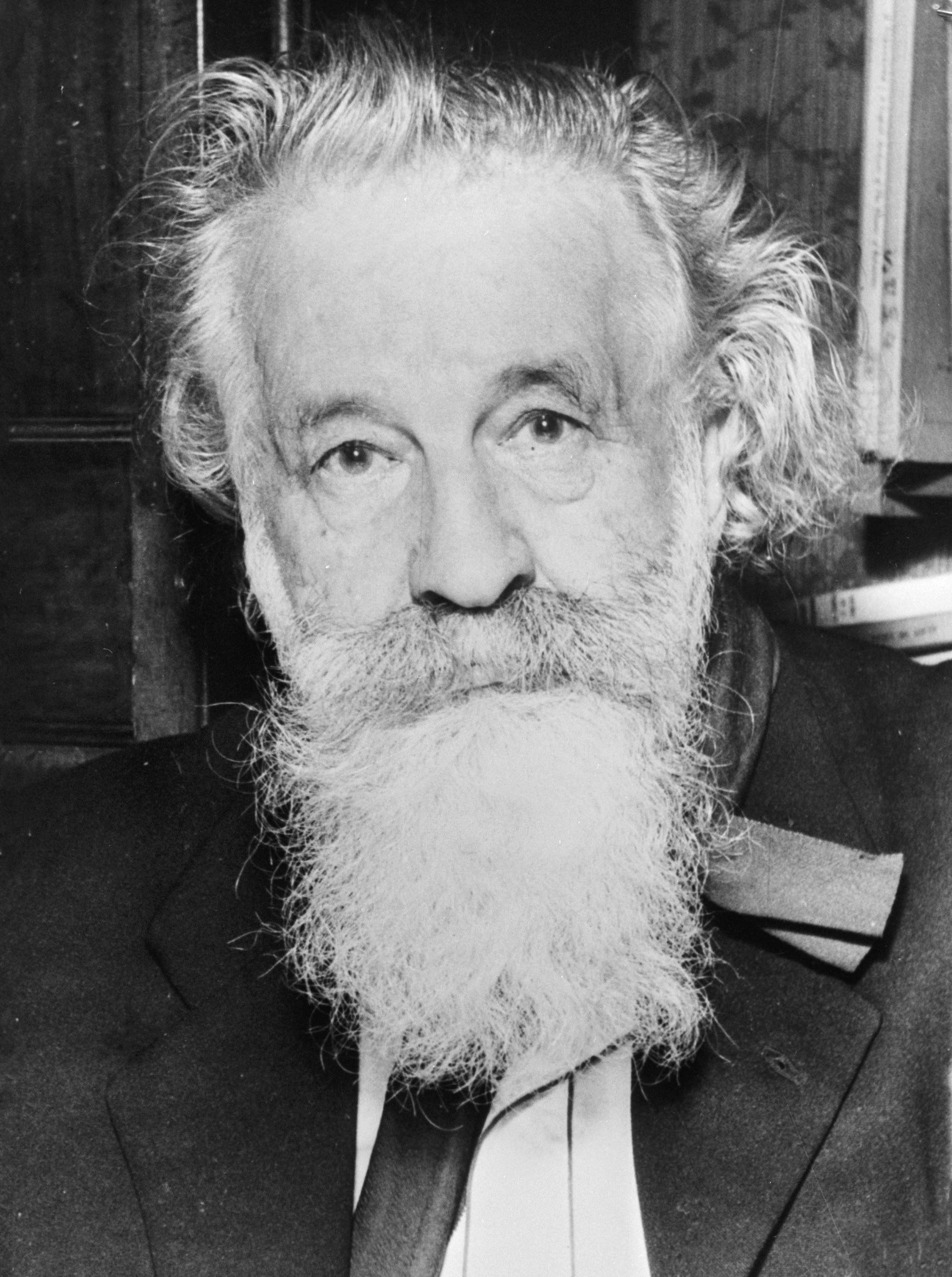
Gaston Bachelard

- June 13
  - Anton Drexler, German far-right politician (d. 1942)
  - Gerald Gardner, English founder of the Wiccan religion (d. 1964)
- June 17 – Prince Wilhelm, Duke of Södermanland (d. 1965)
- June 18 – Édouard Daladier, Prime Minister of France (d. 1970)
- June 21
  - Claude Auchinleck, British field marshal (d. 1981)
  - Gordon Lowe, British tennis player (d. 1972)
- June 23 – Cyclone Taylor, Canadian ice hockey player (d. 1979)
- June 25 – Empress Teimei, Japanese consort of Emperor Taishō (d. 1951)
- June 27 – Gaston Bachelard, French philosopher (d. 1962)
- June 29 – Nicolae Dăscălescu, Romanian general (d. 1969)
- June 30 – Franz Halder, German general (d. 1972)

=== July ===
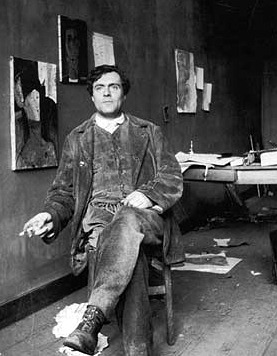
Amedeo Modigliani

- July 4 – Louis B. Mayer, American film producer, studio mogul (d. 1957)
- July 11 – Howard Estabrook, American actor, film director and producer, and screenwriter (d. 1978)
- July 12 – Amedeo Modigliani, Italian painter, sculptor (d. 1920)
- July 15 – Phraya Manopakorn Nititada, Thailand's first prime minister (d. 1948)
- July 17 – Prince George Bagration, Georgian nobleman (d. 1957)
- July 18 – Alberto di Jorio, Italian cardinal, secretary of the 1958 conclave (d. 1979)
- July 19 – Maurice Nicoll, British psychiatrist (d. 1953)
- July 20 – Félix Julien, french footballer (d. 1936)
- July 23 – Emil Jannings, Swiss-born German actor (d. 1950)
- July 25 – Rafael Arévalo Martínez, Guatemalan writer (d. 1975)
- July 26 – Joseph Sweeney, American actor (d. 1963)
- July 27 – Kathleen Howard, Canadian-born American opera singer, character actress (d. 1956)

=== August ===
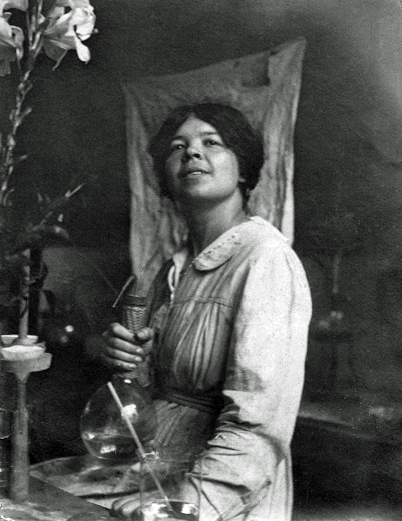
Nathalie Demassieux

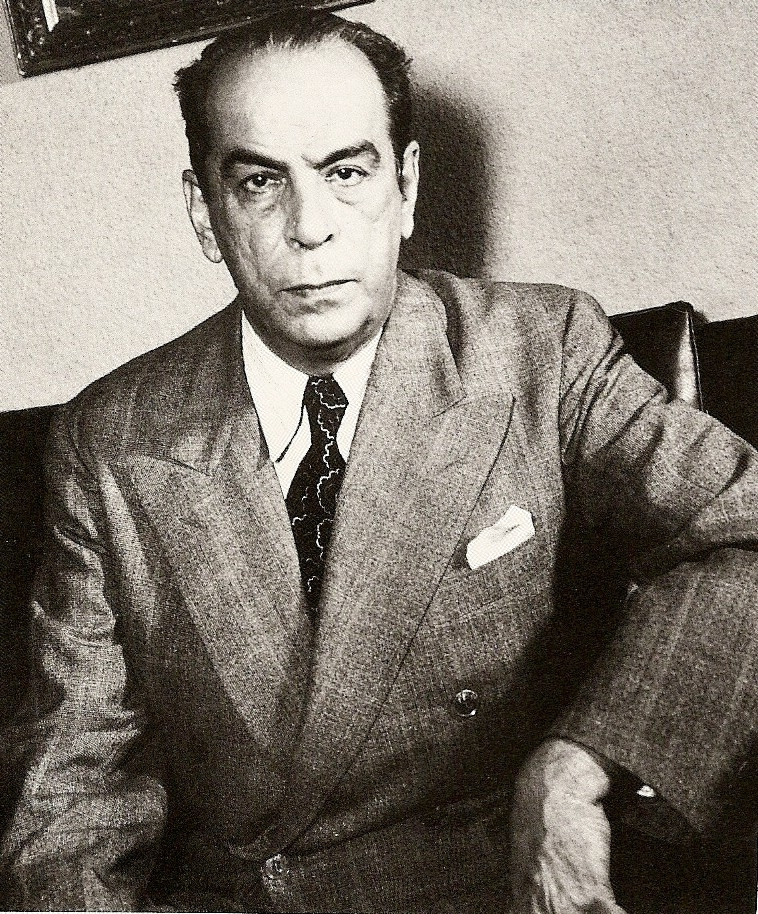
Rómulo Gallegos

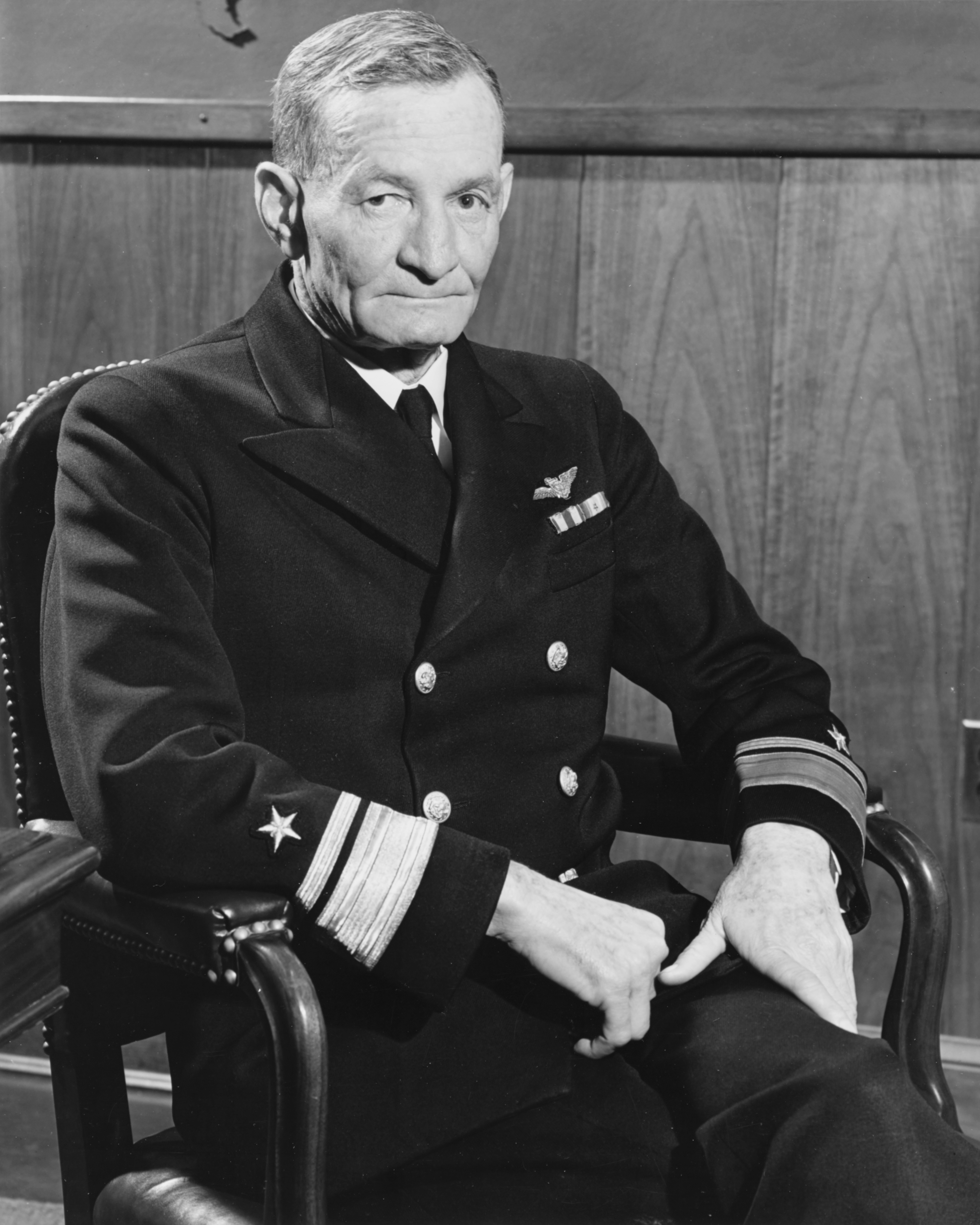
John S. McCain Sr.

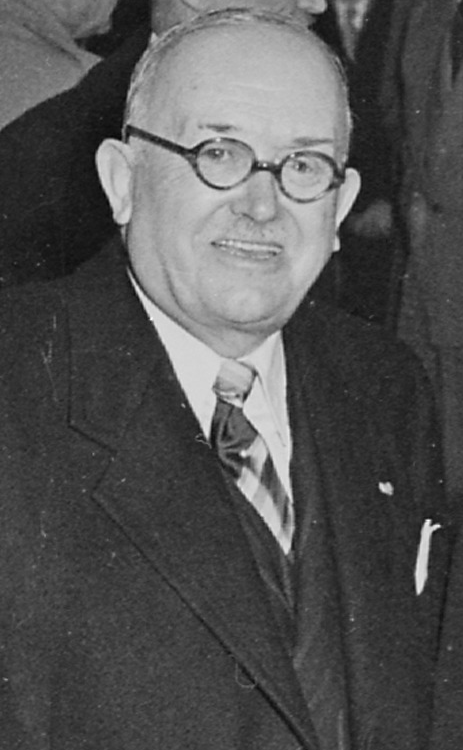
Vincent Auriol

- August 2 – Rómulo Gallegos, 48th president of Venezuela (d. 1969)
- August 7 – Billie Burke, American actress (d. 1970)
- August 8 – Sara Teasdale, American poet (d. 1933)
- August 9 – John S. McCain Sr., American admiral (d. 1945)
- August 10
  - Robert G. Fowler, American pioneer aviator (d. 1966)
  - Robert Wichard Pohl, German "Father of solid state physics" (d. 1976)
  - Panait Istrati, Romanian writer (d. 1935)
- August 15 – Mary Nash, American actress (d. 1976)
- August 20 – Rudolf Bultmann, German Lutheran theologian (d. 1976)
- August 23 – Will Cuppy, American humorist (d. 1949)
- August 25 – Nathalie Demassieux, French chemist and academic (d. 1961)
- August 27 – Vincent Auriol, President of France (d. 1966)
- August 28 – Peter Fraser, 24th prime minister of New Zealand (d. 1950)
- August 30 – Theodor Svedberg, Swedish chemist, Nobel Prize laureate (d. 1971)

=== September ===
- September 12 – Helen Palmatary, American anthropologist (d. 1976)
- September 13 – Petros Voulgaris, Prime Minister of Greece (d. 1957)
- September 17
  - Charles Tomlinson Griffes, American composer (d. 1920)
  - Edith Alice Macia, Arizona pioneer, postmaster, and undercover FBI agent (d. 1974)
- September 18 – Margit Slachta, Hungarian politician (d. 1974)
- September 24
  - İsmet İnönü, Turkish soldier, statesman, 3-time prime minister of Turkey and 2nd president of Turkey (d. 1973)
  - Hugo Schmeisser, German weapons designer (d. 1953)
- September 25 – Forrest Smithson, American Olympic athlete (d. 1962)
- September 30 – Bessie Barriscale, American actress (d. 1965)

=== October ===
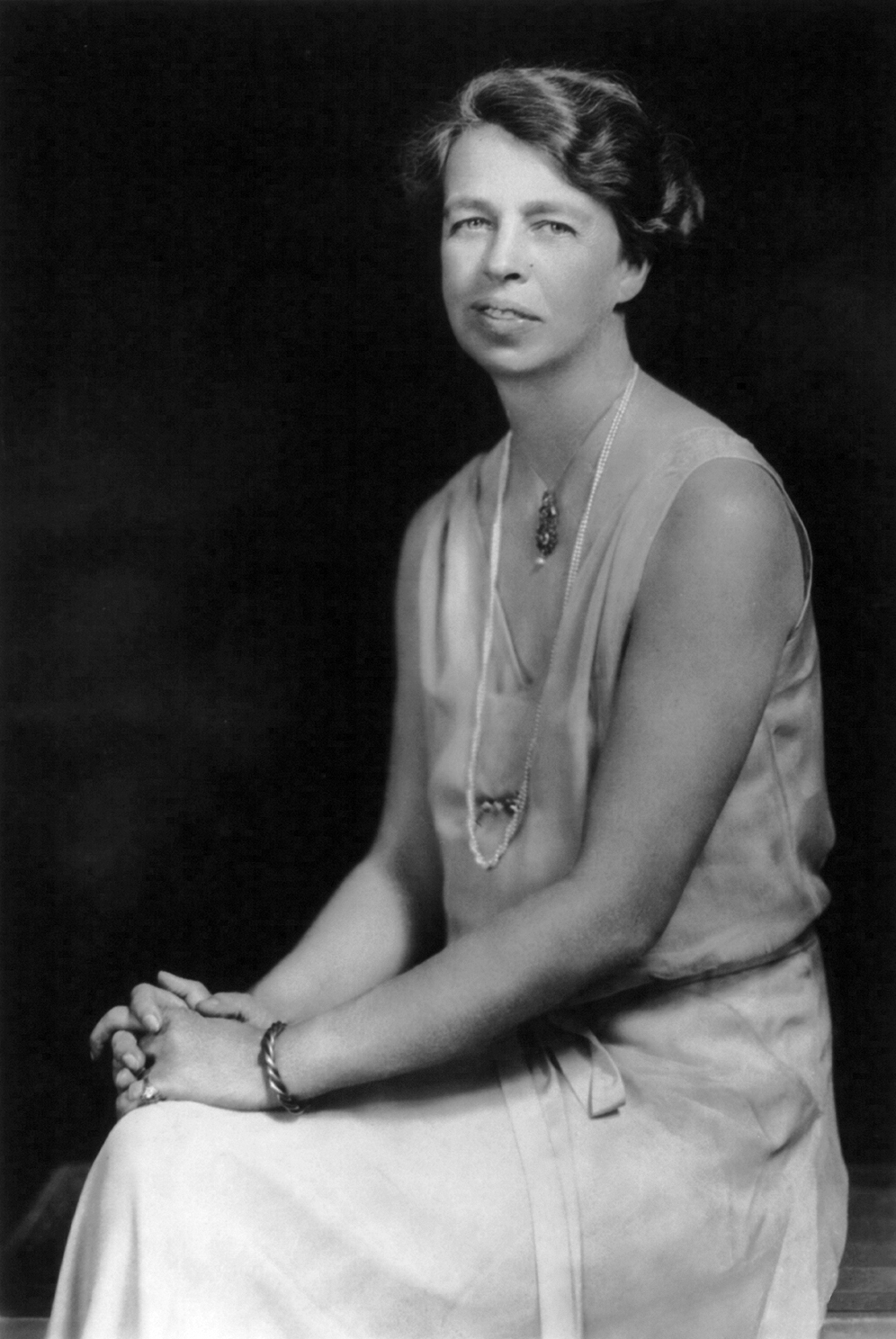
Eleanor Roosevelt

- October 8 – Walther von Reichenau, German field marshal (d. 1942)
- October 9 – Martin Johnson, American adventurer, documentary filmmaker (d. 1937)
- October 11
  - Friedrich Bergius, German chemist, Nobel Prize laureate (d. 1949)
  - Eleanor Roosevelt, American politician, diplomat, activist, and First Lady of the United States (d. 1962)
- October 16 – Rembrandt Bugatti, Italian sculptor (d. 1916)
- October 20 – D. S. Senanayake, 1st prime minister of Sri Lanka (d. 1952)
- October 24 – Arthur S. Carpender, American admiral (d. 1960)
- October 28 – William Douglas Cook, New Zealand founder of Eastwoodhill Arboretum and Pukeiti (d. 1967)

=== November ===
- November 4 – Harry Ferguson, Irish engineer, inventor (d. 1960)
- November 8 – Hermann Rorschach, Swiss psychologist (d. 1922)
- November 20 – Norman Thomas, American social reformer (d. 1968)
- November 22 – Sulaiman Nadvi, Indian/Pakistani historian, biographer, littérateur and scholar of Islam (d. 1953)
- November 24 – Yitzhak Ben-Zvi, 2nd president of Israel (d. 1963)

=== December ===
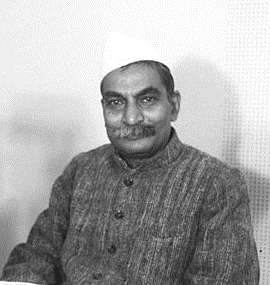
Rajendra Prasad

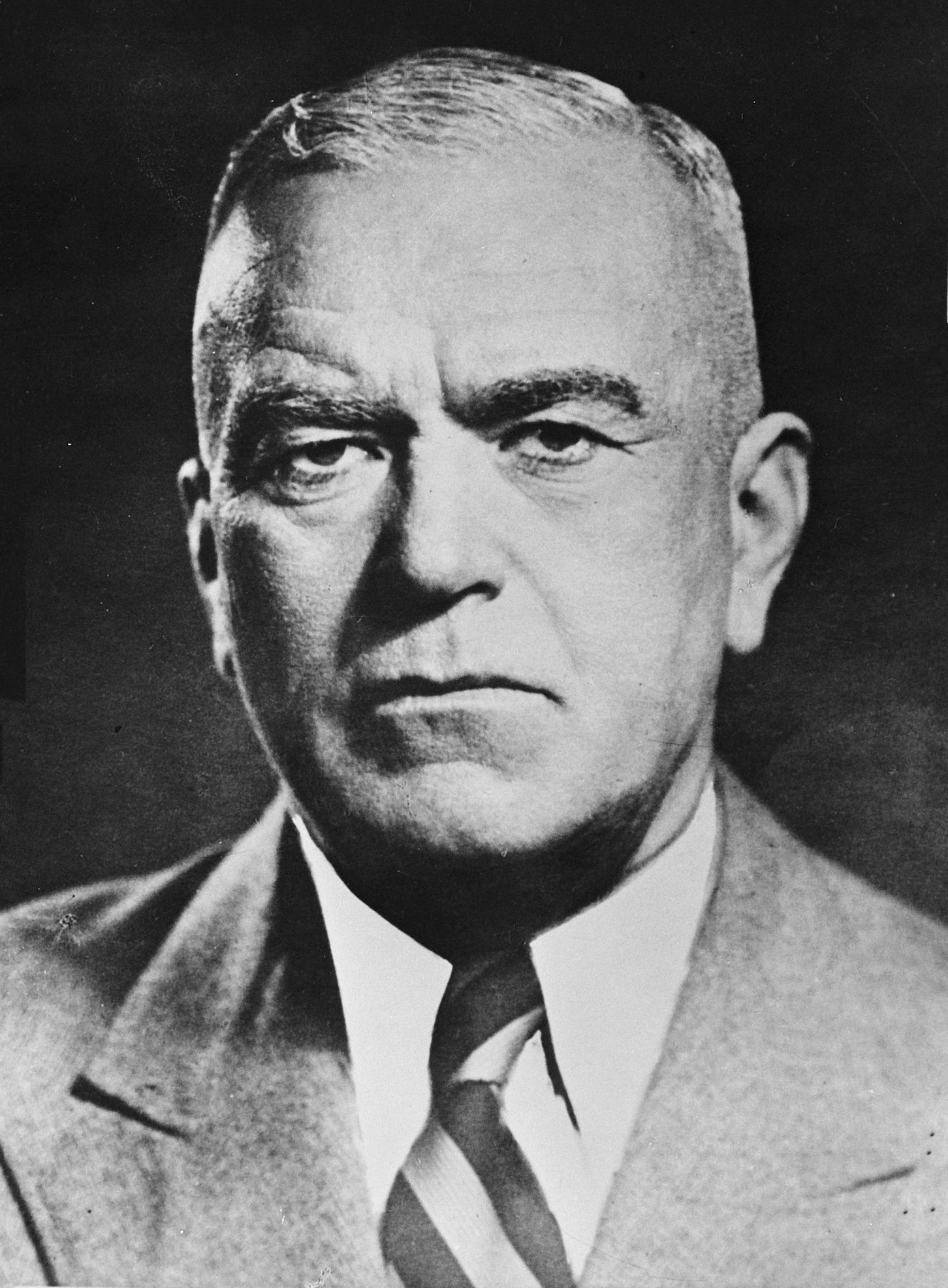
Petru Groza

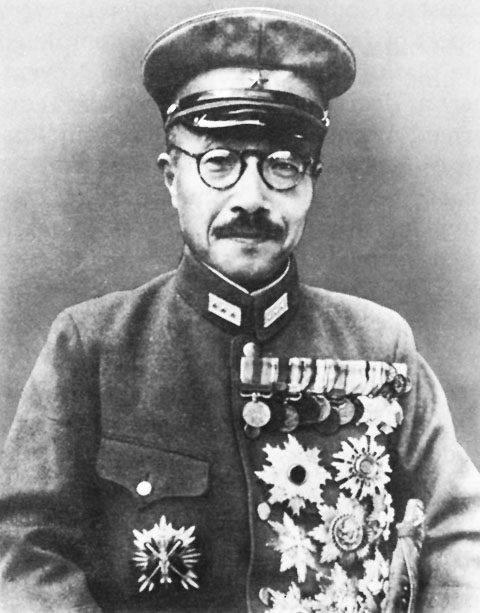
Hideki Tojo

- December 3
  - Walther Stampfli, member of the Swiss Federal Council (d. 1965)
  - Rajendra Prasad, Indian politician, 1st president of India (d. 1963)
- December 4 – R. C. Majumdar, Indian historian (d. 1980)
- December 7 – Petru Groza, Romanian politician, 46th prime minister of Romania (d. 1958)
- December 14 – Nicholas Charnetsky, Soviet Orthodox priest, bishop, martyr and blessed (d. 1959)
- December 17 – Alison Uttley, English writer of children's books (d. 1976)
- December 19 – Antonín Zápotocký, 6th president and 15th prime minister of Czechoslovakia (d. 1957)
- December 25
  - Samuel Berger, American Olympic boxer (d. 1925)
  - Evelyn Nesbit, American model, actress (d. 1967)
- December 29 – Ted Theodore, Australian politician, Premier of Queensland (d. 1950)
- December 30
  - Arthur Edmund Carewe, Armenian-American actor (d. 1937)
  - Hideki Tojo, Japanese general, 27th prime minister of Japan (d. 1948)
- December 31 – Stanley Forman Reed, Associate Justice of the Supreme Court of the United States (d. 1980)

=== Date unknown ===
- Ayoub Tabet, 6th prime minister of Lebanon (d. 1947)

1885

=== January ===
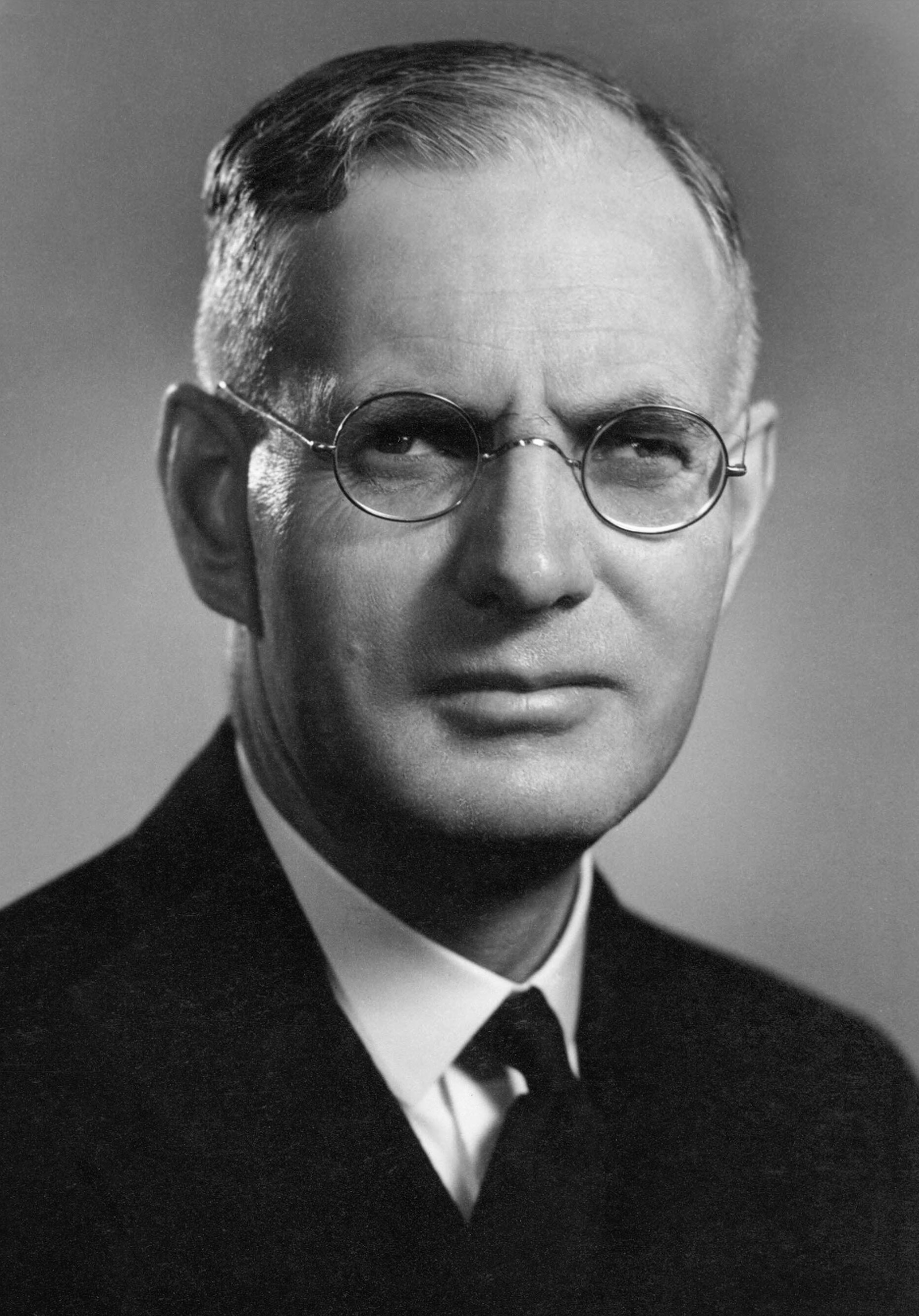
John Curtin

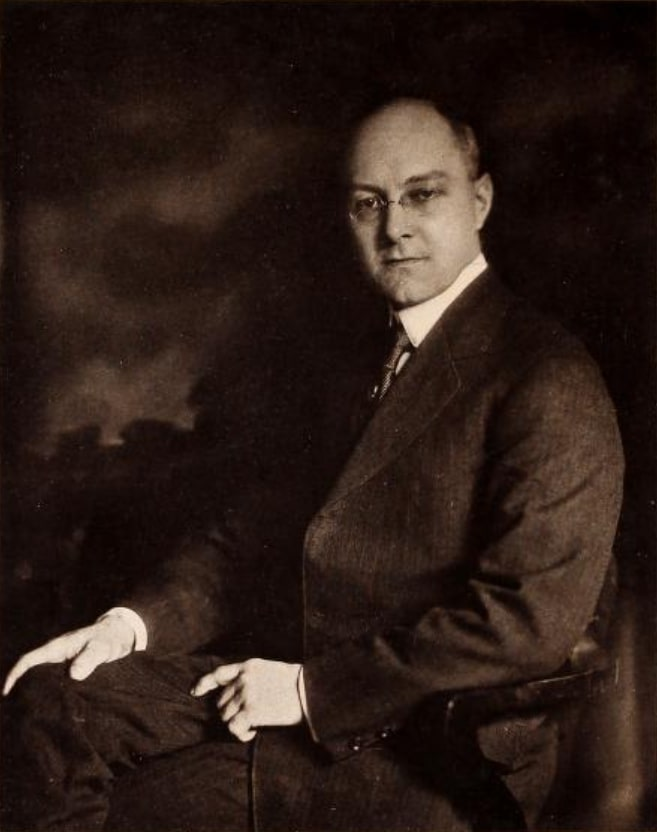
Claude Fuess

- January 1 – Winifred Greenwood, American silent film actress (d. 1961)
- January 6 – Florence Turner, American actress (d. 1946)
- January 8 – John Curtin, 14th Prime Minister of Australia (d. 1945)
- January 11
  - Jack Hoxie, American actor, rodeo performer (d. 1965)
  - Alice Paul, American women's rights activist (d. 1977)
- January 12
  - Harry Benjamin, American endocrinologist, sexologist (d. 1986)
  - Claude Fuess, American author, historian and headmaster (d. 1963)
- January 14 – Constantin Sănătescu, 44th prime minister of Romania (d. 1947)
- January 16 – Zhou Zuoren, Chinese writer (d. 1967)
- January 17 – Nikolaus von Falkenhorst, German general and war criminal (d. 1968)
- January 21 – Umberto Nobile, Italian aviator and explorer (d. 1978)
- January 25 – Roy Geiger, American general (d. 1947)
- January 26 – Harry Ricardo, English mechanical engineer, engine pioneer (d. 1974)
- January 27
  - Jerome Kern, American composer (d. 1945)
  - Harry Ruby, American musician, composer, and writer (d. 1974)
- January 28 – Władysław Raczkiewicz, President of Poland (d. 1947)
- January 30 – John Henry Towers, U. S.admiral and naval aviation pioneer (d. 1955)

=== February ===
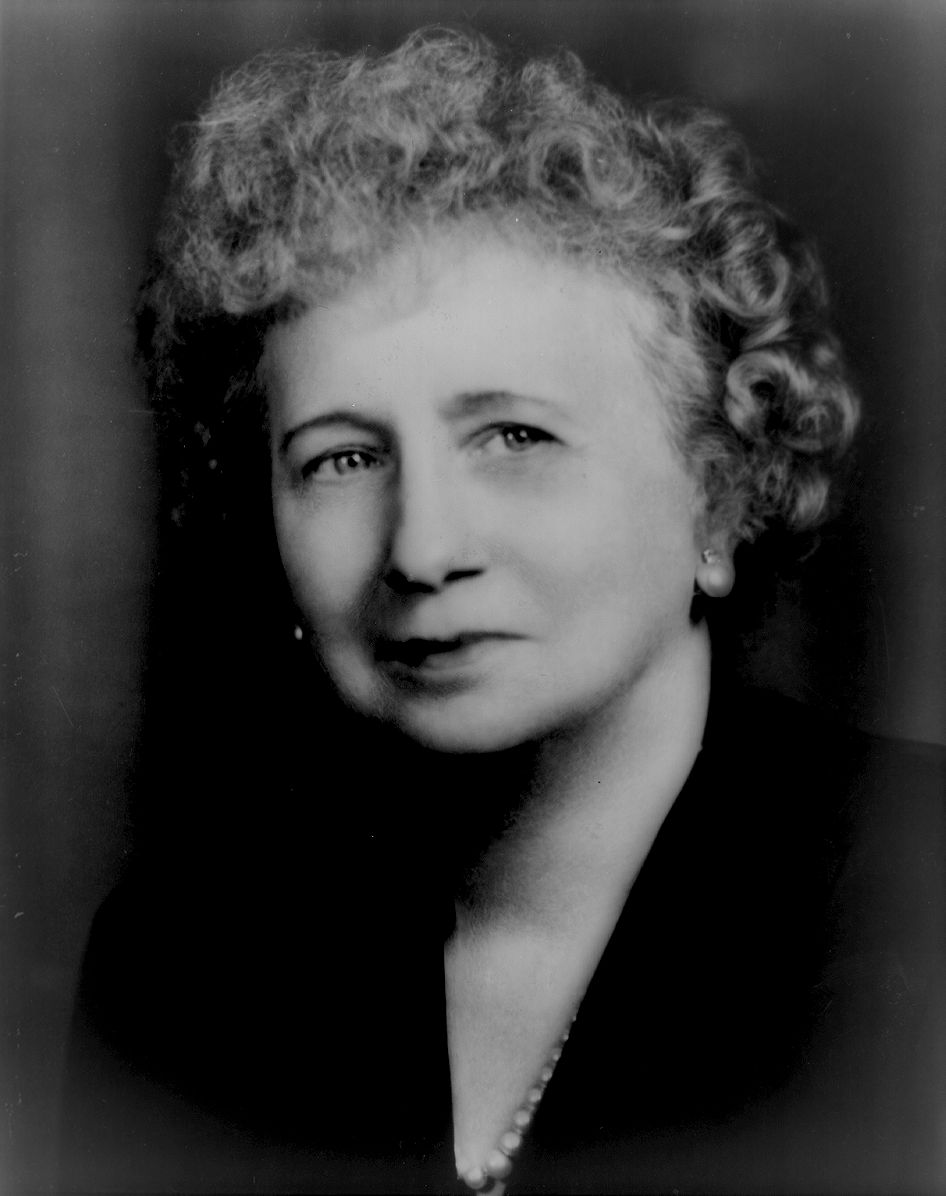
Bess Truman

- February 1 – Friedrich Kellner, German diarist (d. 1970)
- February 7
  - Sinclair Lewis, American writer, Nobel Prize laureate (d. 1951)
  - Hugo Sperrle, German field marshal (d. 1953)
- February 9 – Alban Berg, Austrian composer (d. 1935)
- February 10 – Rupert Downes, Australian general (d. 1945)
- February 13
  - George Fitzmaurice, French-American motion picture director (d. 1940)
  - Bess Truman, First Lady of the United States (d. 1982)
- February 14 – Zengo Yoshida, Japanese admiral (d. 1966)
- February 21 – Sacha Guitry, Russian-born French dramatist, writer, director, and actor (d. 1957)
- February 22 – Pat Sullivan, Australian-born American director, animated film producer (d. 1933)
- February 24
  - Chester W. Nimitz, American admiral (d. 1966)
  - Stanisław Ignacy Witkiewicz, Polish writer, painter (d. 1939)
- February 25
  - Princess Alice of Battenberg (d. 1969)
  - Fritz Skullerud, Norwegian long-distance runner and station master (d. 1969)
- February 26 – Aleksandras Stulginskis, President of Lithuania (d. 1969)

=== March ===
- March 6 – Ring Lardner, American writer (d. 1933)
- March 7 – John Tovey, British admiral of the fleet (d. 1971)
- March 11 – Sir Malcolm Campbell, English land, water racer (d. 1948)
- March 14 – Raoul Lufbery, French-born American World War I pilot (d. 1918)
- March 23 – Mollie McNutt, Australian poet (d. 1919)
- March 27 – Julio Lozano Díaz, President of Honduras (d. 1957)
- March 31 – Jules Pascin, Bulgarian painter (d. 1930)

=== April ===
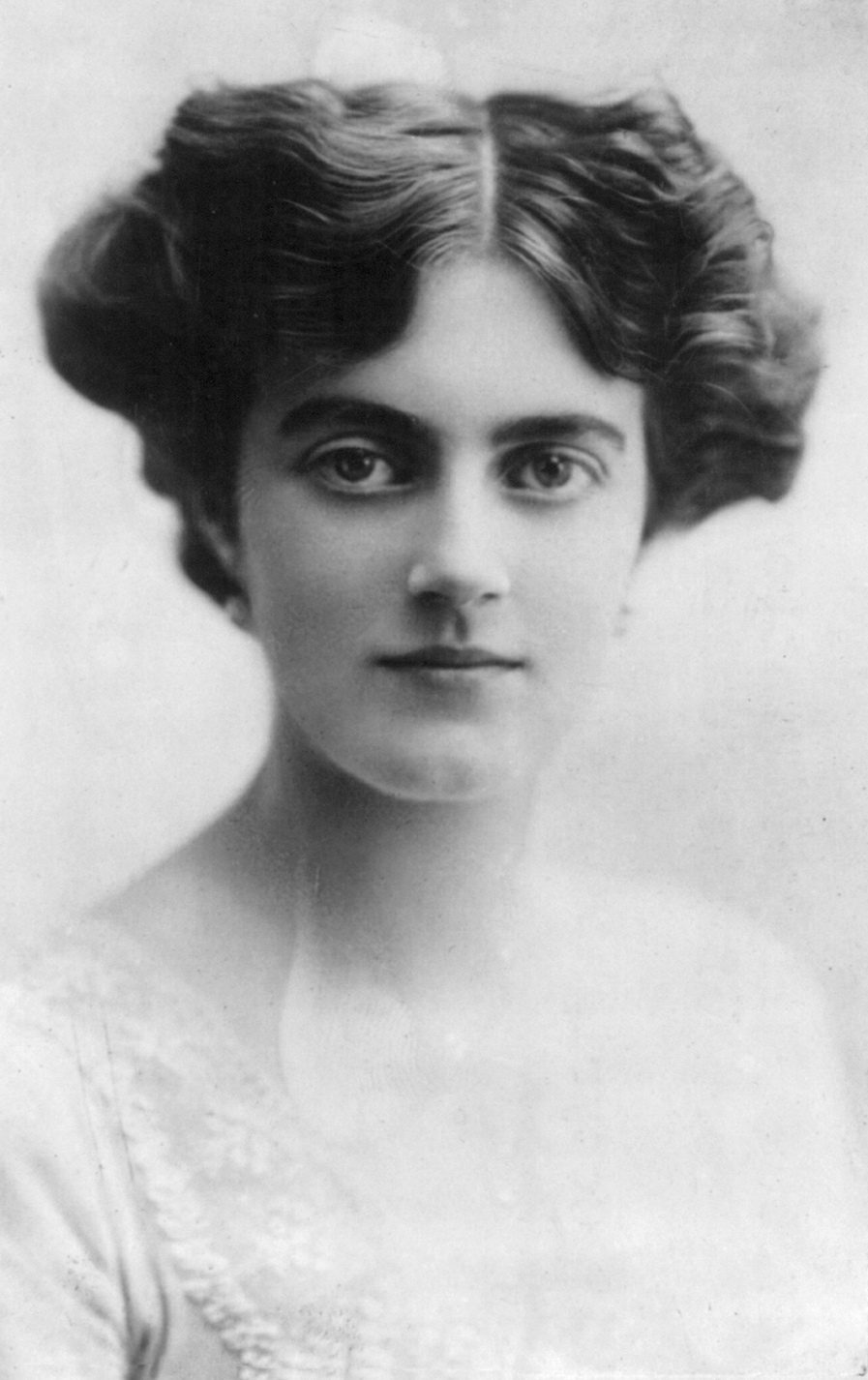
Clementine Churchill

- April 1
  - Wallace Beery, American actor (d. 1949)
  - Clementine Churchill, wife of British Prime Minister Winston Churchill (d. 1977)
- April 3
  - Allan Dwan, Canadian-born American film director (d. 1981)
  - Bud Fisher, American cartoonist (Mutt and Jeff) (d. 1954)
  - St John Philby, Ceylonese-born British orientalist (d. 1960)
- April 12 – Hermann Hoth, German general (d. 1971)
- April 13
  - John Cunningham, British admiral (d. 1962)
  - Otto Plath, American father of poet Sylvia Plath, entomologist (d. 1940)
- April 15 – Tadeusz Kutrzeba, Polish general (d. 1947)
- April 16 – Charles Debbas, 1st president, 5th prime minister of Lebanon (d. 1935)
- April 17 – Karen Blixen, Danish author (d. 1962)
- April 29 – Frank Jack Fletcher, American admiral (d. 1973)

=== May ===
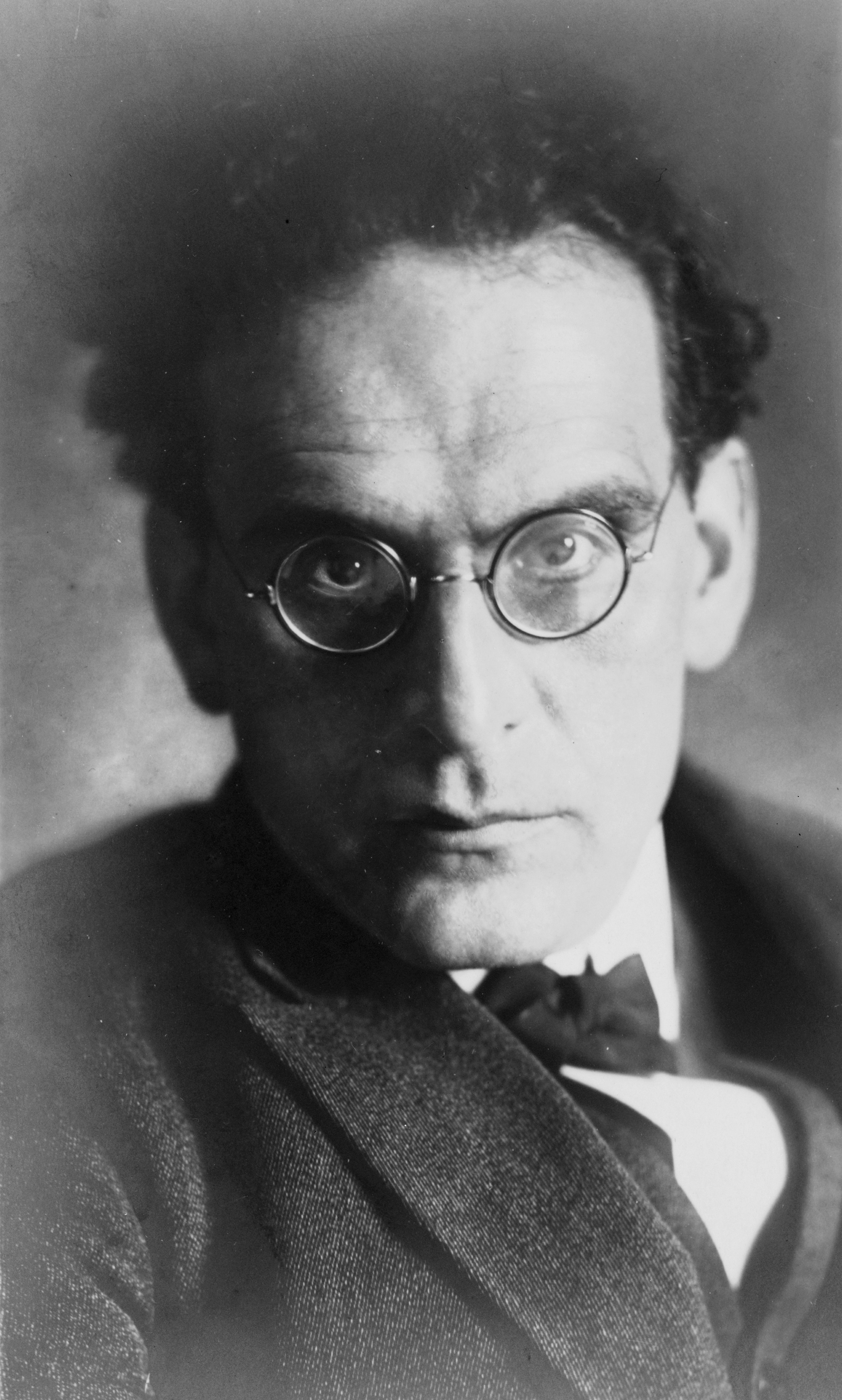
Otto Klemperer

- May 2 – Hedda Hopper, American columnist (d. 1966)
- May 5 – Agustín Barrios, Paraguayan guitarist, composer (d. 1944)
- May 7 – George "Gabby" Hayes, American actor (d. 1969)
- May 8 – Thomas B. Costain, Canadian author and journalist (d. 1965)
- May 9 – Eduard C. Lindeman, American social worker, author (d. 1953)
- May 14 – Otto Klemperer, German conductor (d. 1973)
- May 15
  - Robert James Hudson, Governor of Southern Rhodesia (d. 1963)
  - Naokuni Nomura, Japanese admiral and Minister of the Navy (d. 1973)
- May 20 – Faisal I, King of Iraq (d. 1933)
- May 21 – Sophie, Princess of Albania, consort of William of Wied, Prince of Albania (d. 1936)
- May 22 – Toyoda Soemu, Japanese admiral (d. 1957)
- May 24 – Susan Sutherland Isaacs, English educational psychologist, psychoanalyst (d. 1948)
- May 27 – Richmond K. Turner, American admiral (d. 1961)
- May 30 – Arthur E. Andersen, American accountant (d. 1947)

=== June ===
- June 2 – Hans Gerhard Creutzfeldt, German neuropathologist (d. 1964)
- June 4 – Arturo Rawson, President of Argentina (d. 1952)
- June 5 – Georges Mandel, French politician, World War II hero (d. 1944)
- June 9
  - John Edensor Littlewood, British mathematician (d. 1977)
  - Felicjan Sławoj Składkowski, Prime Minister of Poland (d. 1962)
  - Harry Gribbon, American comedy actor (d. 1961)
- June 19 – Adela Pankhurst, British-Australian suffragette and political activist (d. 1961)
- June 21 – Harry A. Marmer, Ukrainian-born American mathematician, oceanographer (d. 1953)
- June 22 – Milan Vidmar, Slovenian electrical engineer, chess player (d. 1962)
- June 27 – Guilhermina Suggia, Portuguese cellist (d. 1950)
- June 29 – Izidor Kürschner, Hungarian football player and coach (d. 1941)

=== July ===
- July 2 – Nikolai Krylenko, Russian Bolshevik and Soviet politician (d. 1938)
- July 6 – Ernst Busch, German field marshal (d. 1945)
- July 8 – Paul Leni, German film director (The Cat and the Canary) (d. 1929)
- July 9 – Luo Meizhen, Chinese supercentenarian (d. 2013)
- July 14 – King Sisavang Vong of Laos (d. 1959)
- July 15
  - Abd al-Rahman al-Mahdi, 1st prime minister of Sudan (d. 1959)
- July 16 – Hakuun Yasutani, Japanese Sōtō rōshi (d. 1973)
- July 19
  - Dumitru Coroamă, Romanian soldier and fascist activist (d. 1956)
  - Aristides de Sousa Mendes, Portuguese diplomat, humanitarian (d. 1954)
- July 20 – Michitarō Komatsubara, Japanese general (d. 1940)
- July 28 – Monte Attell, American boxer (d. 1960)
- July 29 – Theda Bara, American silent film actress (d. 1955)

=== August ===
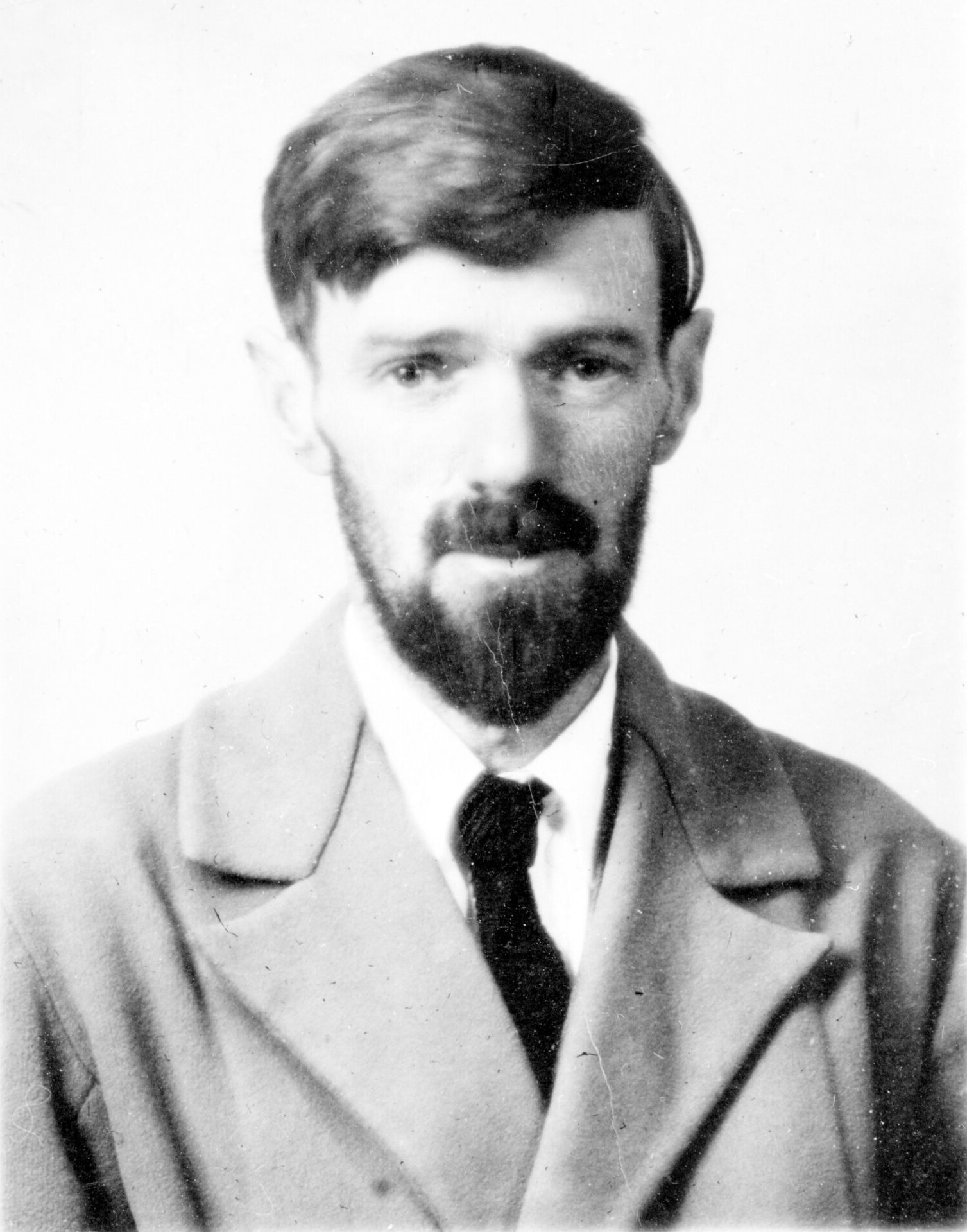
D H Lawrence

- August 1 – George de Hevesy, Hungarian chemist, Nobel Prize laureate (d. 1966)
- August 17 – Ernest Dezentjé, Dutch-Indonesian painter (d. 1972)

=== September ===
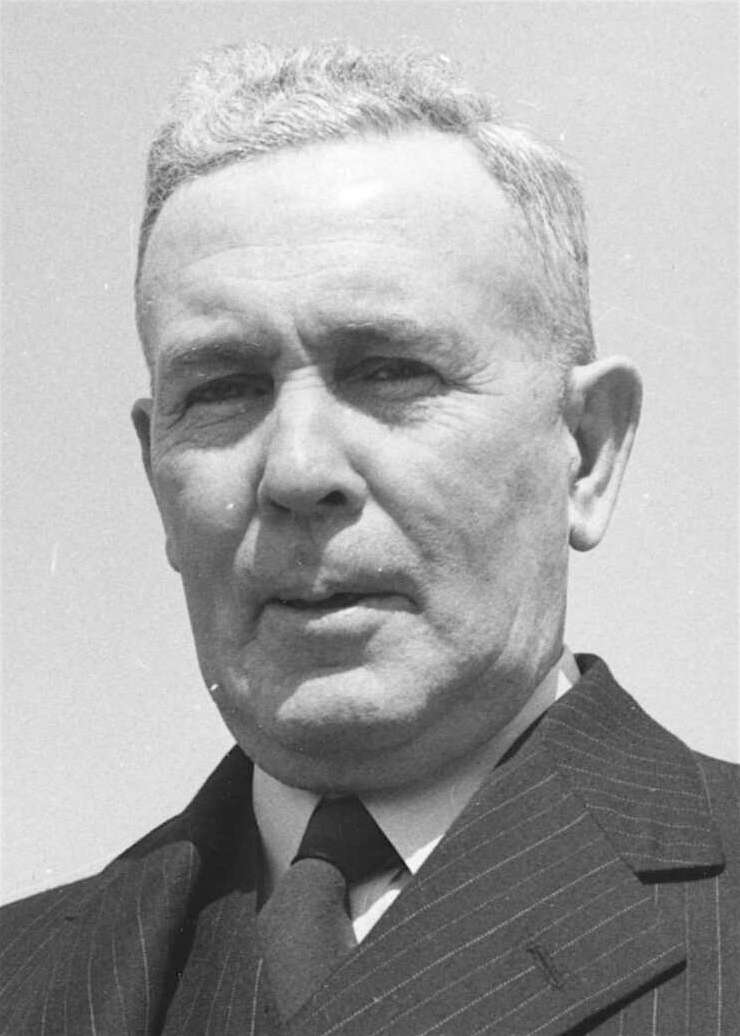
Ben Chifley

- September 6 – Otto Kruger, American actor (d. 1974)
- September 7 – Jovita Idar, Mexican-American journalist and political activist (d. 1946)
- September 11 – D. H. Lawrence, English novelist (d. 1930)
- September 20 – Enrico Mizzi, 6th Prime Minister of Malta (d. 1950)
- September 21 – Thomas de Hartmann, Russian composer (d. 1956)
- September 22
  - Ben Chifley, 16th Prime Minister of Australia (d. 1951)
  - Erich von Stroheim, Austrian-born motion picture actor, director (d. 1957)
- September 25 – Mineichi Koga, Japanese admiral (d. 1944)
- September 27 – Harry Blackstone Sr., American magician and illusionist (d. 1965)

=== October ===
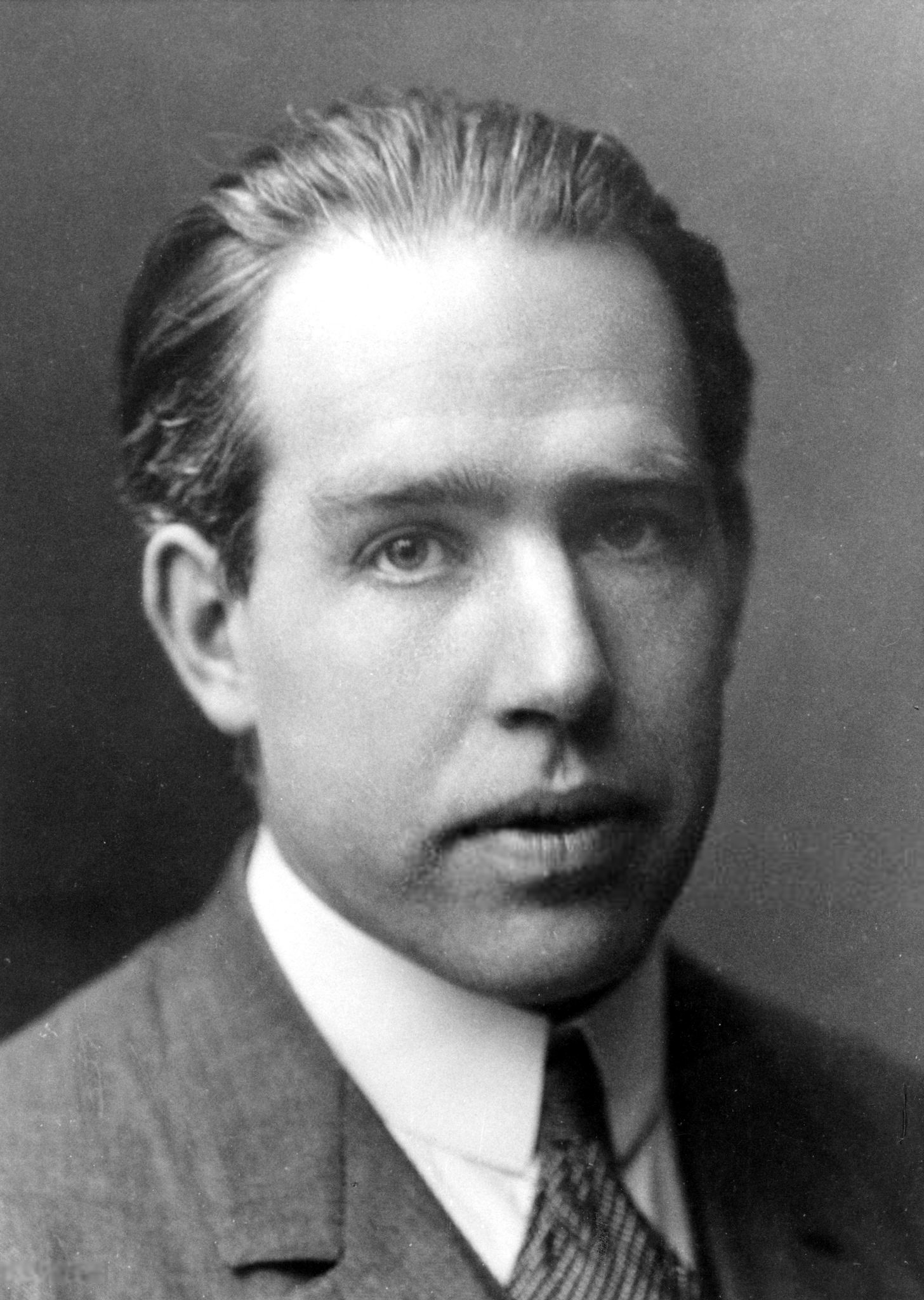
Niels Bohr

- October 3 – Sophie Treadwell, American playwright, journalist (d. 1970)
- October 7 – Niels Bohr, Danish physicist, Nobel Prize laureate (d. 1962)
- October 11 – François Mauriac, French writer, Nobel Prize laureate (d. 1970)
- October 19 – Charles E. Merrill, American banker, co-founder of Merrill Lynch (d. 1956)
- October 24 – Rachel Katznelson-Shazar, Zionist political figure, wife of third President of Israel (d. 1975)
- October 28 – Per Albin Hansson, 2-time prime minister of Sweden (d. 1946)
- October 30 – Ezra Pound, American poet (d. 1972)

=== November ===
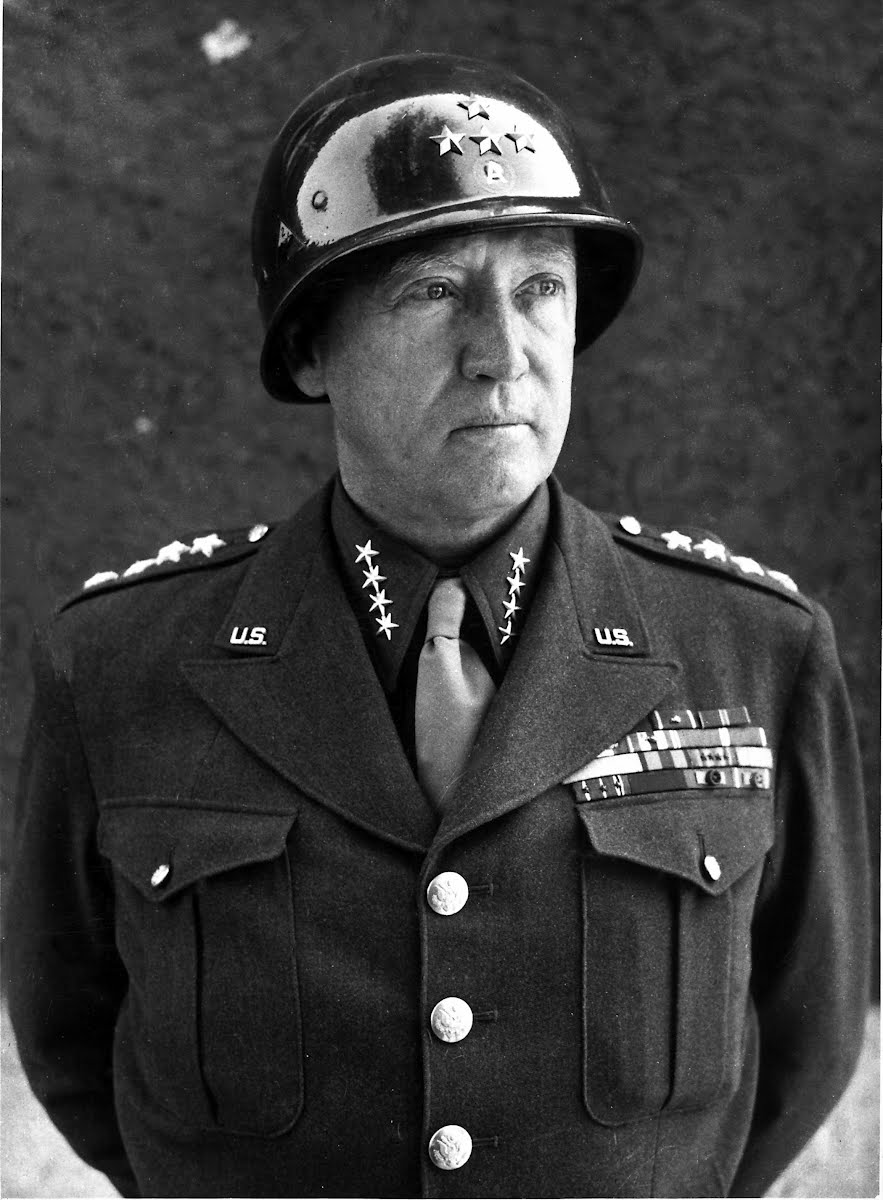
George S. Patton

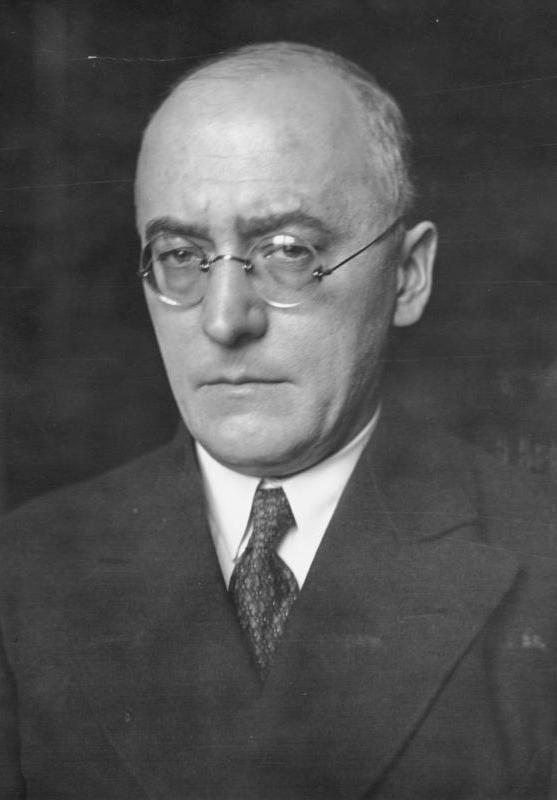
Heinrich Brüning

- November 1 – Anton Flettner, German aviation engineer, inventor (d. 1961)
- November 2 – Harlow Shapley, American astronomer (d. 1972)
- November 5 – Will Durant, American philosopher, writer (d. 1981)
- November 8 – Tomoyuki Yamashita, Japanese general (d. 1946)
- November 9 (October 28 (O.S.)) – Velimir Khlebnikov, Russian poet (d. 1922)
- November 11 – George S. Patton, American general (d. 1945)
- November 15 – Frederick Handley-Page, British aviation pioneer, aircraft company founder (d. 1962)
- November 21 – Edmée Chandon, first professional female astronomer in France, first woman in France to earn a doctorat d'État in mathematics. (d. 1944)
- November 26 – Heinrich Brüning, Chancellor of Germany 1930-1932 (d. 1970)
- November 30
  - Albert Kesselring, German field marshal (d. 1960)
  - Ma Zhanshan, Chinese general (d. 1950)

=== December ===
- December 2 – George Minot, American physician, recipient of the Nobel Prize in Physiology or Medicine (d. 1950)
- December 13 – Mario Talavera, Mexican songwriter (d. 1960)
- December 18 – Walter Crail, American photographer, staff photographer for the Public Ledger (d. 1924)
- December 19
  - John Lavarack, Australian general, Governor of Queensland (1946-1957) (d. 1957)
  - King Oliver, American jazz musician (d. 1938)
- December 22 – Deems Taylor, American composer and music critic (d. 1966)
- December 29 – Eliza Marian Butler, British scholar and writer (d. 1959)

=== Date unknown ===
- Martha, the last Passenger pigeon (d. 1914)
- Geza von Hoffmann, Austrian-Hungarian eugenicist and writer (d. 1921)
- Alessandro Tonini, Italian aeronautical engineer and aircraft designer and manufacturer (d. 1932)

1886

=== January–February ===
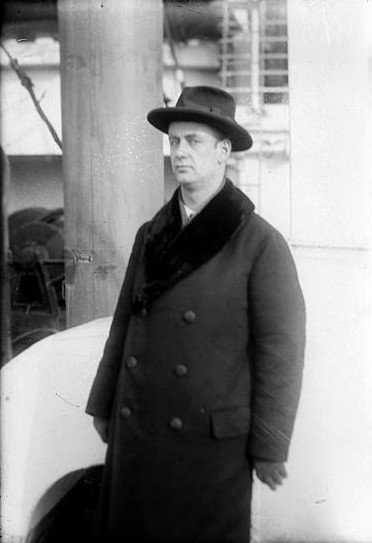
Wilhelm Furtwängler

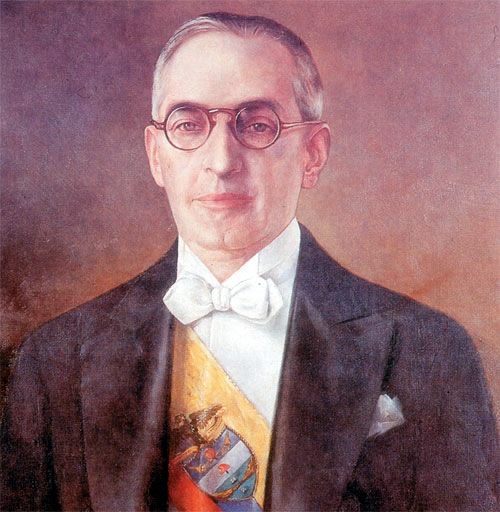
Alfonso López Pumarejo

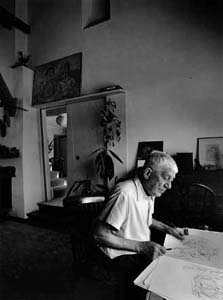
Oskar Kokoschka

- January 2
  - Apsley Cherry-Garrard, English polar explorer with the Terra Nova expedition and author of The Worst Journey in the World (d. 1959)
  - Florence Lawrence, Canadian-born American actress (d. 1938)
  - Elise Ottesen-Jensen, Norwegian-Swedish feminist (d. 1973)
- January 5 – Markus Reiner, Israeli scientist (d. 1976)
- January 7 – Amedeo Maiuri, Italian archaeologist (d. 1963)
- January 11
  - George Zucco, English–born American character actor (d. 1960)
  - Chester Conklin, American actor (d. 1971)
- January 13 – Sophie Tucker, Russian-born American singer, comedian (d. 1966)
- January 14 – Hugh Lofting, English-born American author (d. 1947)
- January 17 – Joe Masseria, Italian-born American gangster (d. 1931)
- January 25 – Wilhelm Furtwängler, German conductor (d. 1954)
- January 27 – Frank Nitti, Italian-born American gangster (d. 1943)
- January 28 – Hidetsugu Yagi, Japanese electrical engineer (d. 1976)
- January 31 – Alfonso López Pumarejo, 14th and 16th President of Colombia (d. 1959)
- February 2 – Frank Lloyd, English-born American film director, scriptwriter and producer (d. 1960)
- February 4 – Edward Sheldon, American playwright (d. 1946)
- February 7 – Yehezkel Abramsky, Russian-born British rabbi (d. 1976)
- February 8 – Charlie Ruggles, American actor (d. 1970)
- February 12 – Margarita Fischer, American silent film actress (d. 1975)
- February 19 – José Abad Santos, Filipino jurist, lawyer (d. 1942)
- February 22 – Oskar Kokoschka, Austrian artist and poet (d. 1980)
- February 27 – Hugo Black, Associate Justice of the Supreme Court of the United States (d. 1971)

=== March–April ===
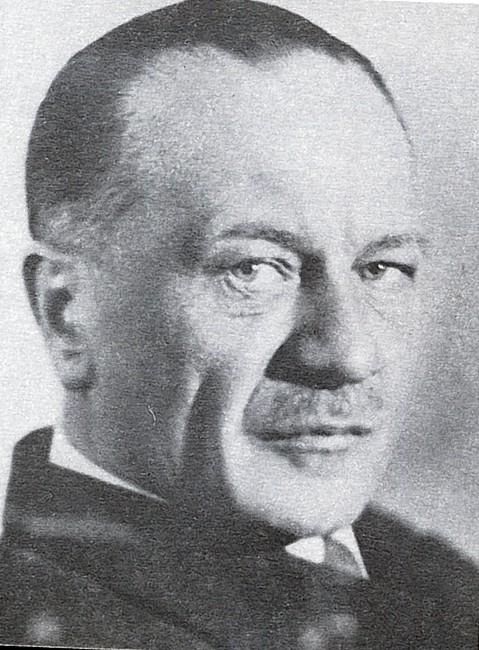
Kazimierz Świtalski

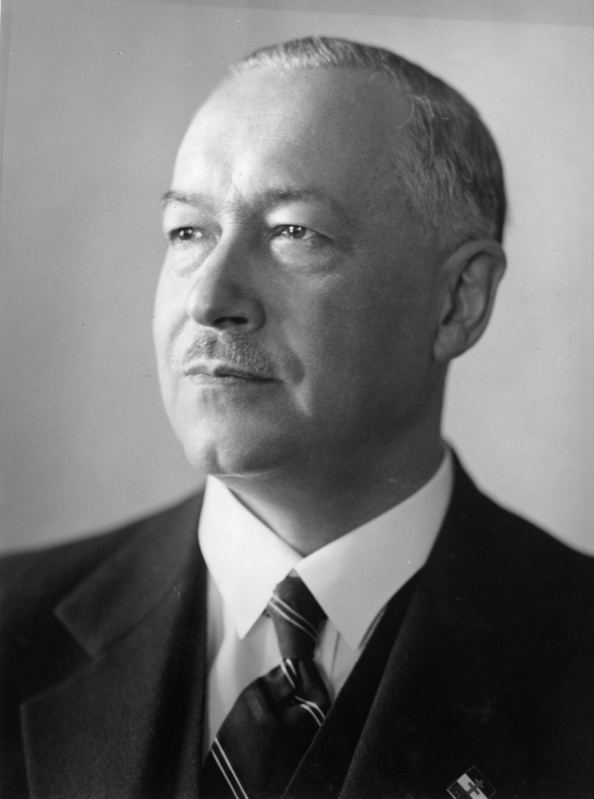
Kálmán Darányi

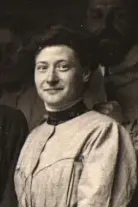
Suzanne Veil

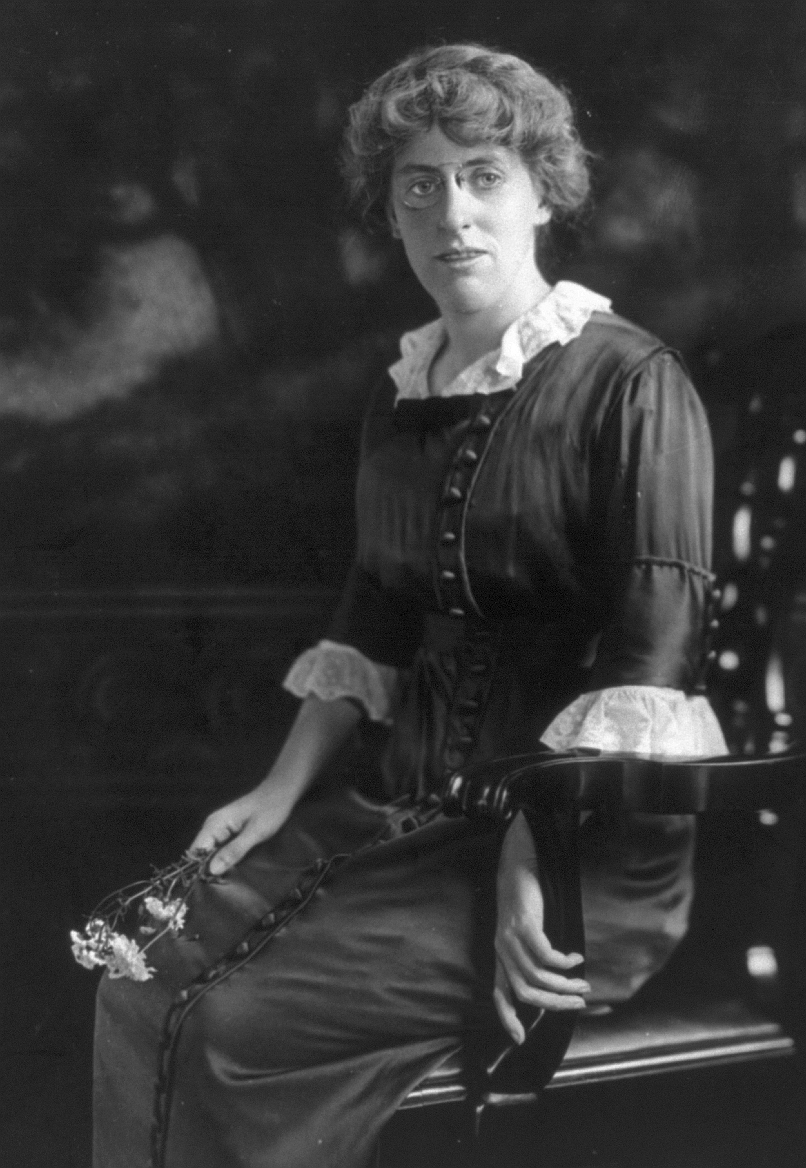
Margaret Woodrow Wilson

- March 1 – Oskar Kokoschka, Austrian-born painter (d. 1980)
- March 2
  - Vittorio Pozzo, Italian football player and manager (d. 1968)
  - Leo Geyr von Schweppenburg, German general (d. 1974)
  - Willis H. O'Brien, American stop motion animator, Academy Award winner (d. 1962)
- March 3
  - R. O. Morris, British composer (d. 1948)
  - James Friskin, Scottish-American pianist and composer (d. 1967)
  - Tore Ørjasæter, Norwegian poet (d. 1968)
- March 4 – Kazimierz Świtalski, Polish diplomat, politician, soldier and military officer, 18th Prime Minister of Poland (d. 1962)
- March 5
  - Dong Biwu, acting Chairman of China, communist revolutionary (d. 1975)
  - Paul Radmilovic, Welsh Olympic medallist in water polo and swimming (d. 1968)
- March 6
  - Saburō Kurusu, Japanese diplomat (d. 1954)
  - Nella Walker, American actress, vaudevillian (d. 1971)
- March 7
  - Virginia Pearson, American silent film actress (d. 1958)
  - René Thomas, French racing driver (d. 1975)
- March 8 – Edward Calvin Kendall, American chemist, recipient of the Nobel Prize in Physiology or Medicine (d. 1972)
- March 9 – Robert L. Eichelberger, American general (d. 1961)
- March 11 – Edward Rydz-Śmigły, Polish politician, Marshal of Poland (d. 1941)
- March 13 – John “Home Run” Baker, American baseball player, Hall of Famer (d. 1963)
- March 14 – Firmin Lambot, Belgian cyclist (d. 1964)
- March 17 – Princess Patricia of Connaught, granddaughter of Queen Victoria (d. 1974)
- March 18
  - Edward Everett Horton, American actor (d. 1970)
  - Lothar von Arnauld de la Perière, German U-boat ace (d. 1941)
  - Kurt Koffka, German psychologist (d. 1941)
  - Marianne Philips, Dutch author and politician (d. 1951)
- March 19 – Giuseppe Mario Bellanca, Italian-born American airplane designer, manufacturer (d. 1960)
- March 22 – Kálmán Darányi, 31st Prime Minister of Hungary (d. 1939)
- March 24 – Edward Weston, American photographer (d. 1958)
- March 25 – Patriarch Athenagoras I of Constantinople (d. 1972)
- March 27
  - Ludwig Mies van der Rohe, German architect (d. 1969)
  - Sergei Kirov, Russian politician, Bolshevik revolutionary (d. 1934)
- March 30 – Stanisław Leśniewski, Polish mathematician and philosopher (d. 1939)
- April 4 – William R. Munroe, American admiral (d. 1966)
- April 5 – Gustavo Jiménez, President of Peru (d. 1933)
- April 14 – Ernst Robert Curtius, Alsatian philologist (d. 1956)
- April 16
  - Ernst Thälmann, German Communist leader (d. 1944)
  - Margaret Woodrow Wilson, American singer; Presidential daughter (d. 1944)
- April 26 – Ma Rainey, American singer (d. 1939)
- April 28 - Suzanne Veil, French chemical engineer and translator (d. 1956)
- April 30 – Dick Elliott, American actor (d. 1961)

=== May–June ===
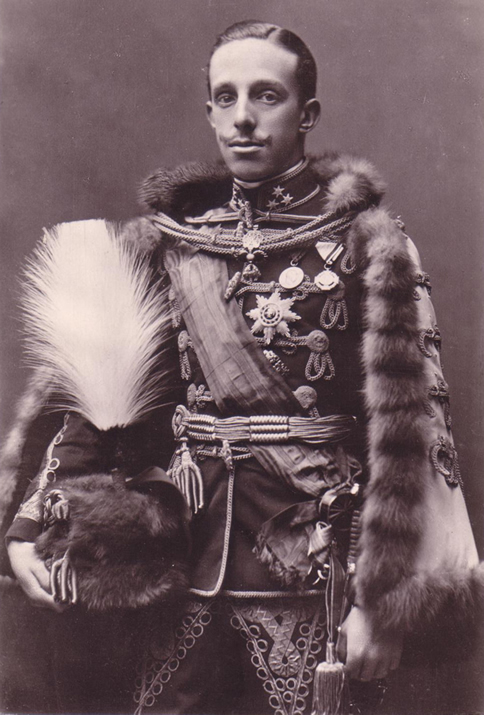
King Alfonso XIII of Spain

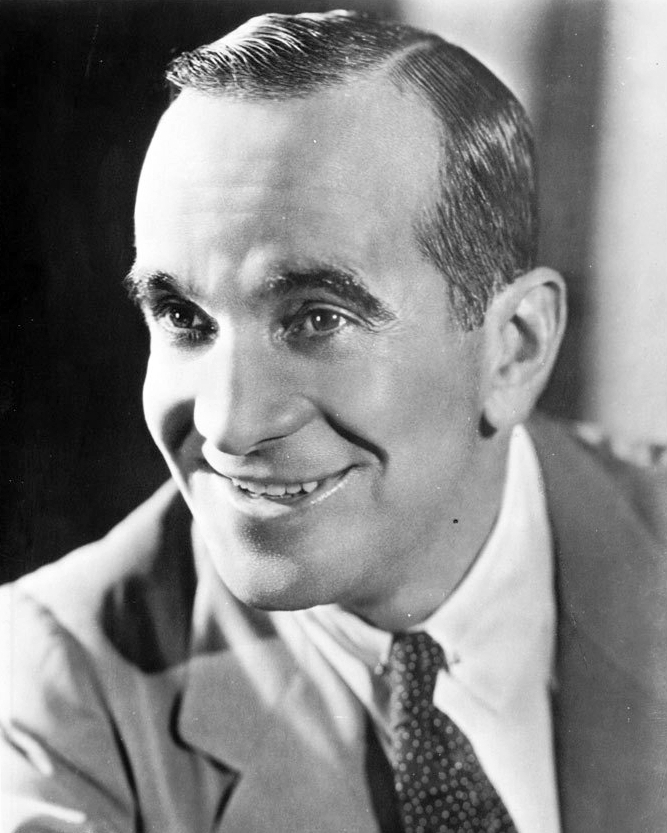
Al Jolson

- May 2 – Gottfried Benn, German poet (d. 1956)
- May 3 – Marcel Dupré, French composer (d. 1971)
- May 5 – Émile Eddé, 4th Prime Minister and 3rd President of Lebanon (d. 1949)
- May 10
  - Karl Barth, Swiss Protestant theologian (d. 1968)
  - Felix Manalo, Filipino Executive Minister (Tagapamahalang Pangkalahatan) of the Iglesia ni Cristo (d. 1963)
  - Olaf Stapledon, British author, philosopher (d. 1950)
- May 17 – King Alfonso XIII of Spain (d. 1941)
- May 18 – Ture Nerman, Swedish communist leader (d. 1969)
- May 20 – John Jacob Astor, 1st Baron Astor of Hever, American-born British businessman (d. 1971)
- May 26 – Al Jolson, American entertainer (d. 1950)
- June 6 – William A. Glassford, American admiral (d. 1958)
- June 7 – Henri Coandă, Romanian aerodynamics pioneer (d. 1972)
- June 9 – Kosaku Yamada, Japanese composer, conductor (d. 1965)
- June 18 – George Mallory, English climber (d. 1924)
- June 24 – Ion Gigurtu, 42nd Prime Minister of Romania (d. 1959)
- June 25 – Henry H. Arnold, American general, aviation pioneer (d. 1950)
- June 28 – Hitoshi Imamura, Japanese general (d. 1968)
- June 29 – Robert Schuman, German-French politician, a founding father of the European Union (d. 1963)

=== July–August ===
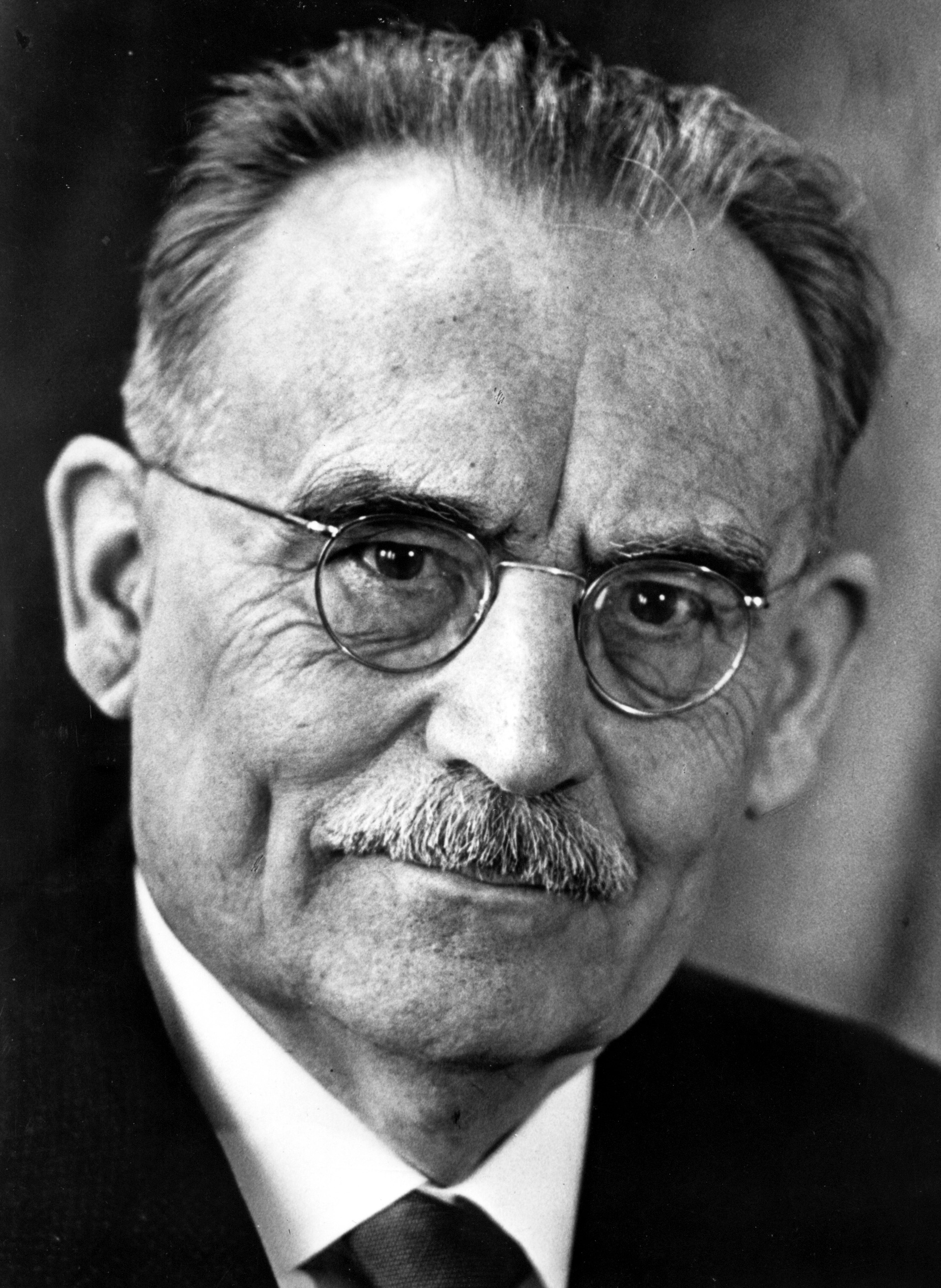
Willem Drees

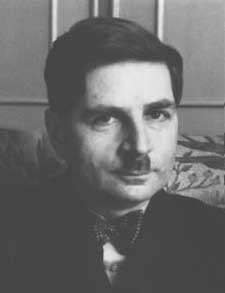
Walter H. Schottky

- July 3
  - Giovanni Battista Caproni, Italian aeronautical, civil, and electrical engineer, aircraft designer, and industrialist (d. 1957)
  - Raymond A. Spruance, American admiral, ambassador (d. 1969)
- July 5 – Willem Drees, Dutch politician and historian, 30th Prime Minister of the Netherlands (d. 1988)
- July 6 – Lou Skuce, Canadian cartoonist (d. 1951)
- July 12 – Jean Hersholt, Danish-born American actor (d. 1956)
- July 18 – Simon Bolivar Buckner Jr., American general (d. 1945)
- July 19 – Marthe Condat, French physician (d. 1939)
- July 23 – Walter H. Schottky, German physicist (d. 1976)
- July 24 – Jun'ichirō Tanizaki, Japanese writer (d. 1965)
- July 25 – Bror von Blixen-Finecke, Swedish big-game hunter (d. 1946)
- July 31 – Fred Quimby, American film producer (d. 1965)
- August 2 – John Alexander Douglas McCurdy, Canadian aviation pioneer, Lieutenant Governor of Nova Scotia (d. 1961)
- August 6
  - Florence Goodenough, American child psychologist (d. 1959)
  - Inez Milholland, American suffragist, labor lawyer, World War I correspondent and public speaker (d. 1916)
- August 12 – Campbell Tait, British admiral and Governor of Southern Rhodesia (d. 1946)
- August 20 – Paul Tillich, German-American Christian existentialist philosopher, theologian (d. 1965)
- August 26 – Ceferino Namuncurá, Argentine Roman Catholic lay brother and blessed (d. 1905)
- August 27
  - Nicolette Bruining, Dutch theologian, humanitarian (d. 1963)
  - Rebecca Clarke, English composer, violist (d. 1979)
  - Eric Coates, English composer (d. 1957)

=== September–October ===
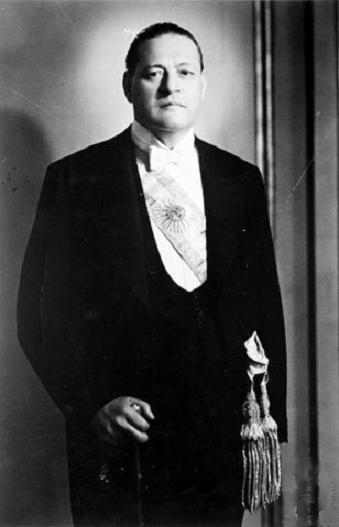
Roberto María Ortiz

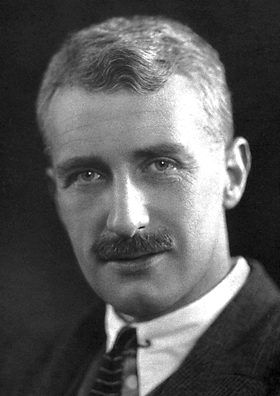
Archibald Hill

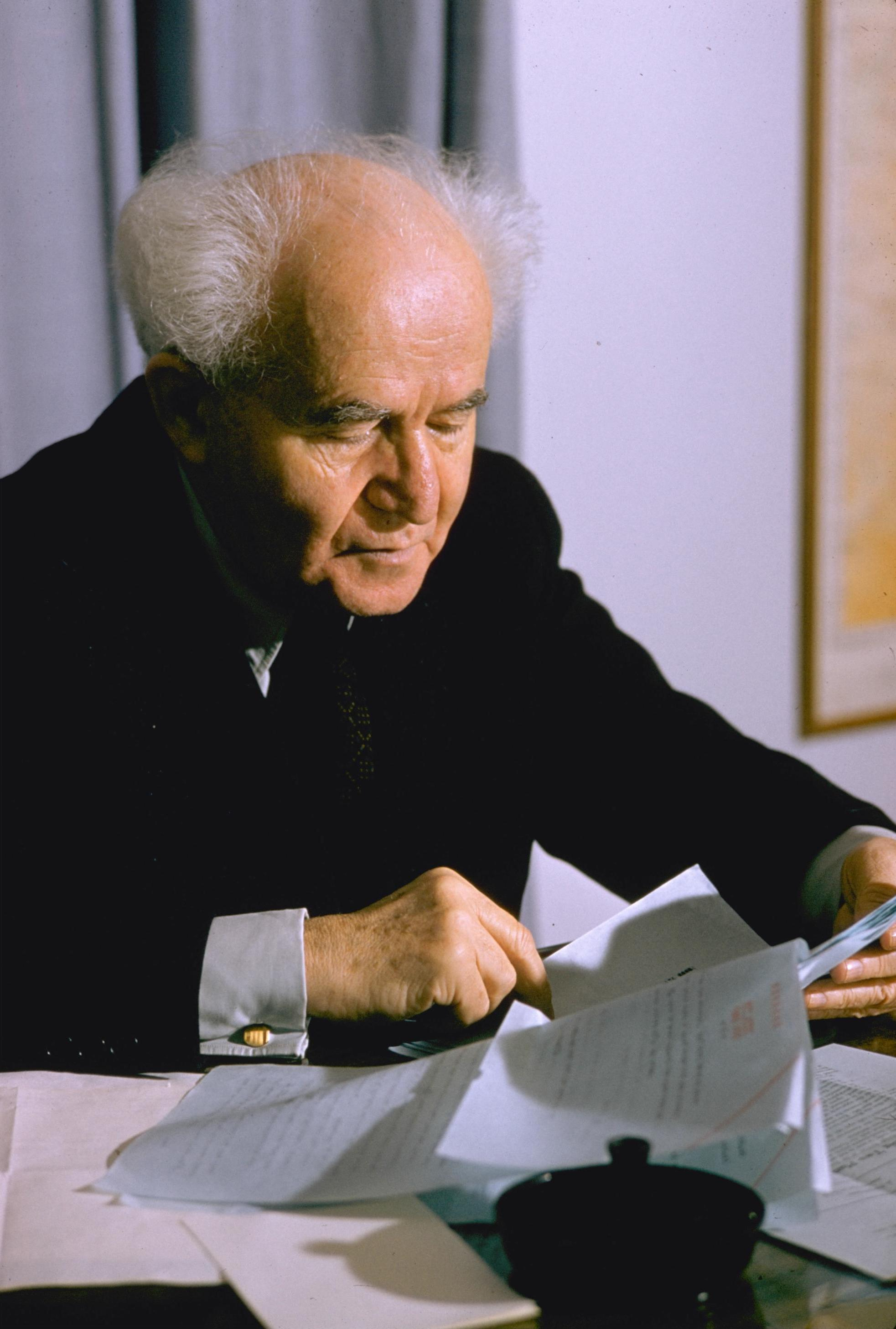
David Ben-Gurion

- September 1
  - Tarsila do Amaral, Brazilian modernist painter (d. 1973)
  - Othmar Schoeck, Swiss composer (d. 1957)
- September 5 – Nell Brinkley, American illustrator, comic artist (d. 1944)
- September 8 – Siegfried Sassoon, British poet (d. 1967)
- September 11 – Khaled Chehab, twice Prime Minister of Lebanon (d. 1978)
- September 13 – Robert Robinson, British chemist, Nobel Prize laureate (d. 1975)
- September 14 – Jan Masaryk, Foreign Minister of Czechoslovakia (d. 1948)
- September 16 – Jean Arp, Alsatian sculptor, painter and poet (d. 1966)
- September 20 – Charles Williams, English novelist, playwright, poet, theologian and critic (d. 1945)
- September 24
  - Edward Bach, English metaphysician, homeopath (d. 1936)
  - Roberto María Ortiz, President of Argentina (d. 1942)
- September 25 – Nobutake Kondō, Japanese admiral (d. 1953)
- September 26 – Archibald Hill, English physiologist, Nobel Prize laureate (d. 1977)
- September 30 – Wilhelm Marschall, German admiral (d. 1976)
- October 3 – Alain-Fournier, French writer (killed in action 1914)
- October 6 – Edwin Fischer, Swiss pianist, conductor (d. 1960)
- October 11 – Conrad Helfrich, Dutch admiral (d. 1962)
- October 14 – Salvador Moreno Fernández, Spanish admiral and politician (d. 1966)
- October 15 – Jonas H. Ingram, American admiral (d. 1952)
- October 16 – David Ben-Gurion, Polish-born first Prime Minister of Israel (d. 1973)
- October 17 – Spring Byington, American actress (d. 1971)
- October 22 – Oscar Griswold, American general (d. 1959)
- October 30 – Zoë Akins, American playwright, poet and author (d. 1958)

=== November–December ===
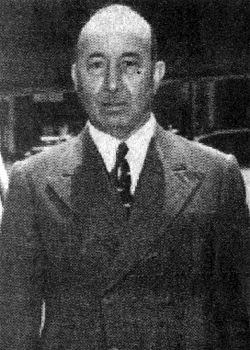
Ali Jawdat al-Aiyubi

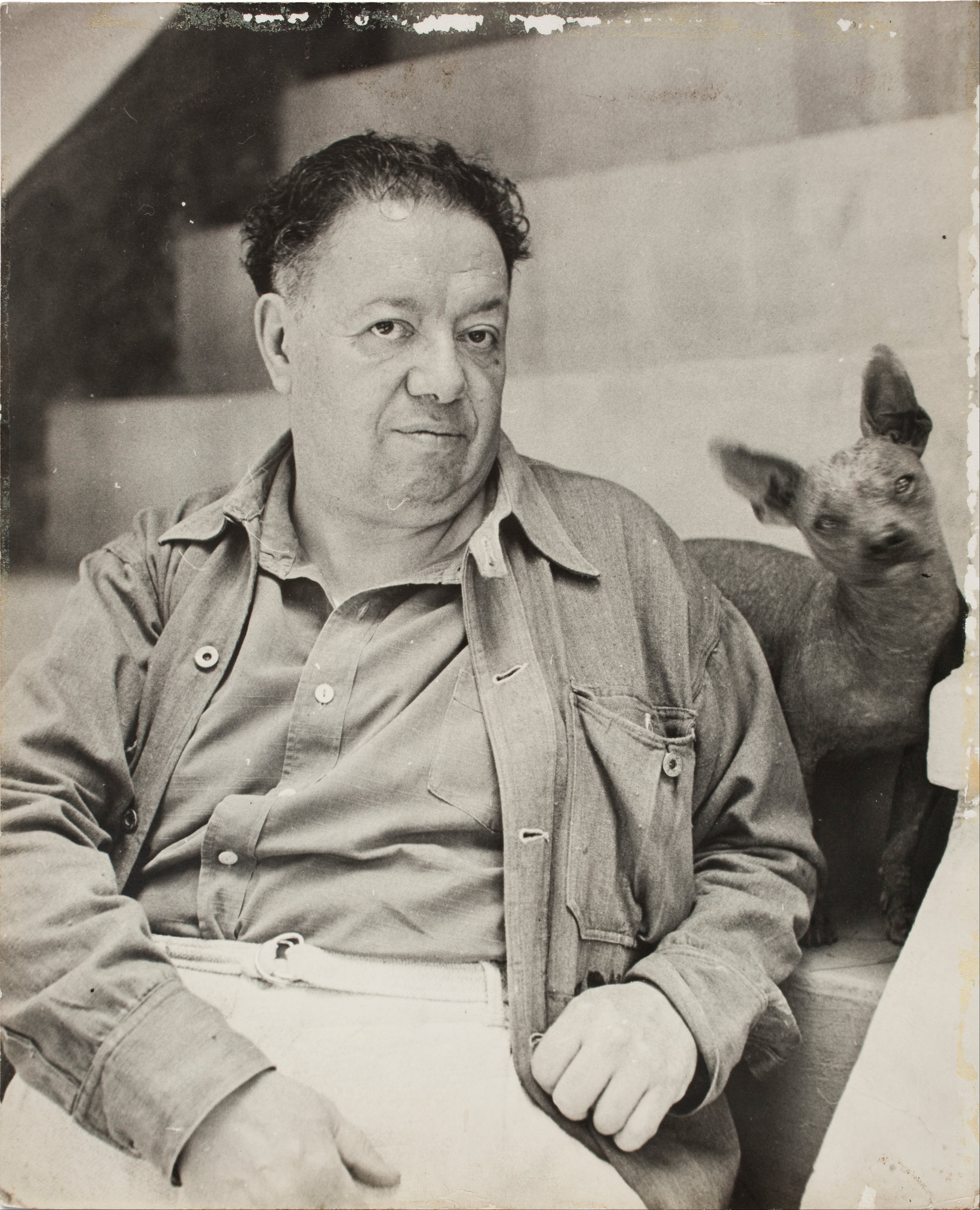
Diego Rivera

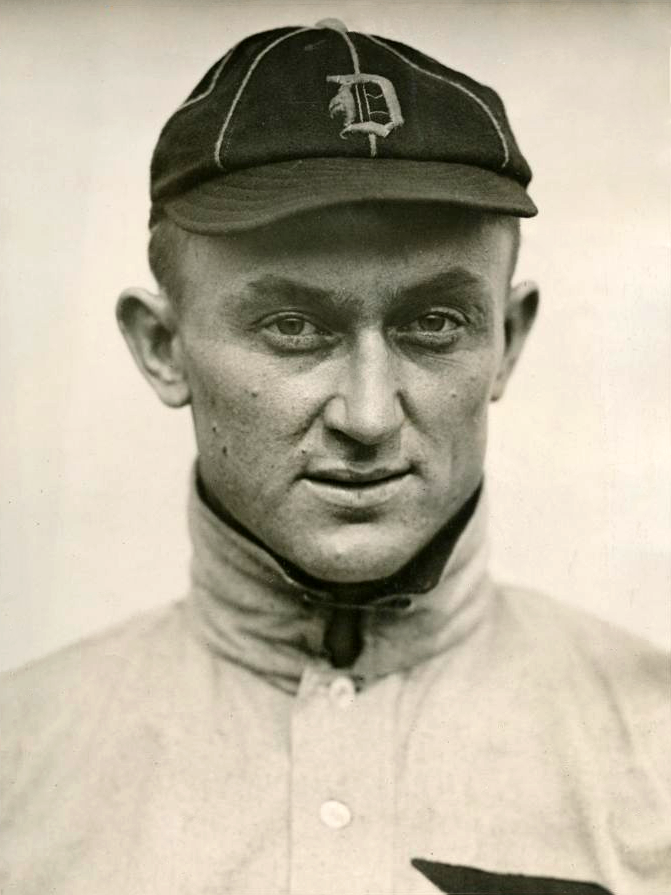
Ty Cobb

- November 1 – Hermann Broch, Austrian author (d. 1951)
- November 2 – Gheorghe Tătărescu, 2-time prime minister of Romania (d. 1957)
- November 6 – André Marty, French Communist Party leader (d. 1956)
- November 9 – Ed Wynn, American actor (d. 1966)
- November 10 – Walden L. Ainsworth, American admiral (d. 1960)
- November 11 – Ali Jawdat al-Aiyubi, 11th Prime Minister of Iraq (d. 1969)
- November 12 – Infante Alfonso, Duke of Galliera, Spanish prince, military aviator (d. 1975)
- November 15 – René Guénon, French-Egyptian author (d. 1951)
- November 18 – Ferenc Münnich, 47th Prime Minister of Hungary (d. 1967)
- November 20 – Karl von Frisch, Austrian zoologist, recipient of the Nobel Prize in Physiology or Medicine (d. 1982)
- November 26 – Margaret C. Anderson, American publisher, editor (d. 1973)
- December 2 – Lester P. Barlow, American inventor and engineer (d. 1967)
- December 3 – Manne Siegbahn, Swedish physicist, Nobel Prize laureate (d. 1978)
- December 5
  - Masakazu Kawabe, Japanese general (d. 1965)
  - Rose Wilder Lane, American author (d. 1968)
- December 8 – Diego Rivera, Mexican painter (d. 1957)
- December 10 – Victor McLaglen, English actor, boxer (d. 1959)
- December 12 – Owen Moore, Irish-born American actor (d. 1939)
- December 18 – Ty Cobb, American baseball player and a member of the Baseball Hall of Fame (d. 1961)
- December 25
  - Gotthard Heinrici, German general (d. 1971)
  - Kid Ory, American jazz musician (d. 1973)
- December 26 – Gyula Gömbös, 30th Prime Minister of Hungary (d. 1936)
- December 30 – Austin Osman Spare, English artist, magician (d. 1956)

=== Unknown ===
- Gabriel of Dionysiou -Greek Orthodod Archimandrite in Mount Athos (d. 1983)
- Cola Nicea, Aromanian soldier (d. unknown)
- Petro Trad, 5th President and 14th Prime Minister of Lebanon (d. 1947)

1887

=== January–February ===
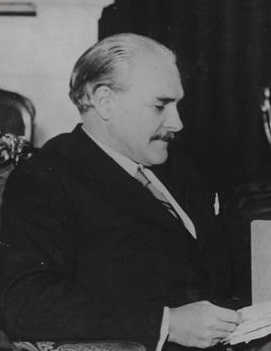
Miklós Kállay

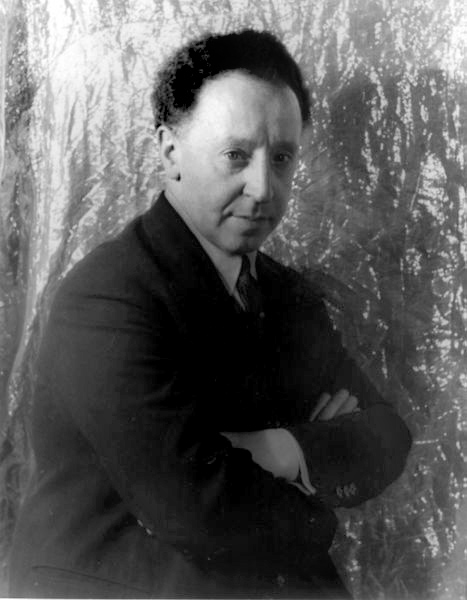
Arthur Rubinstein

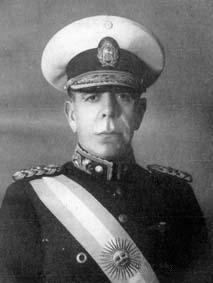
Edelmiro Julián Farrell

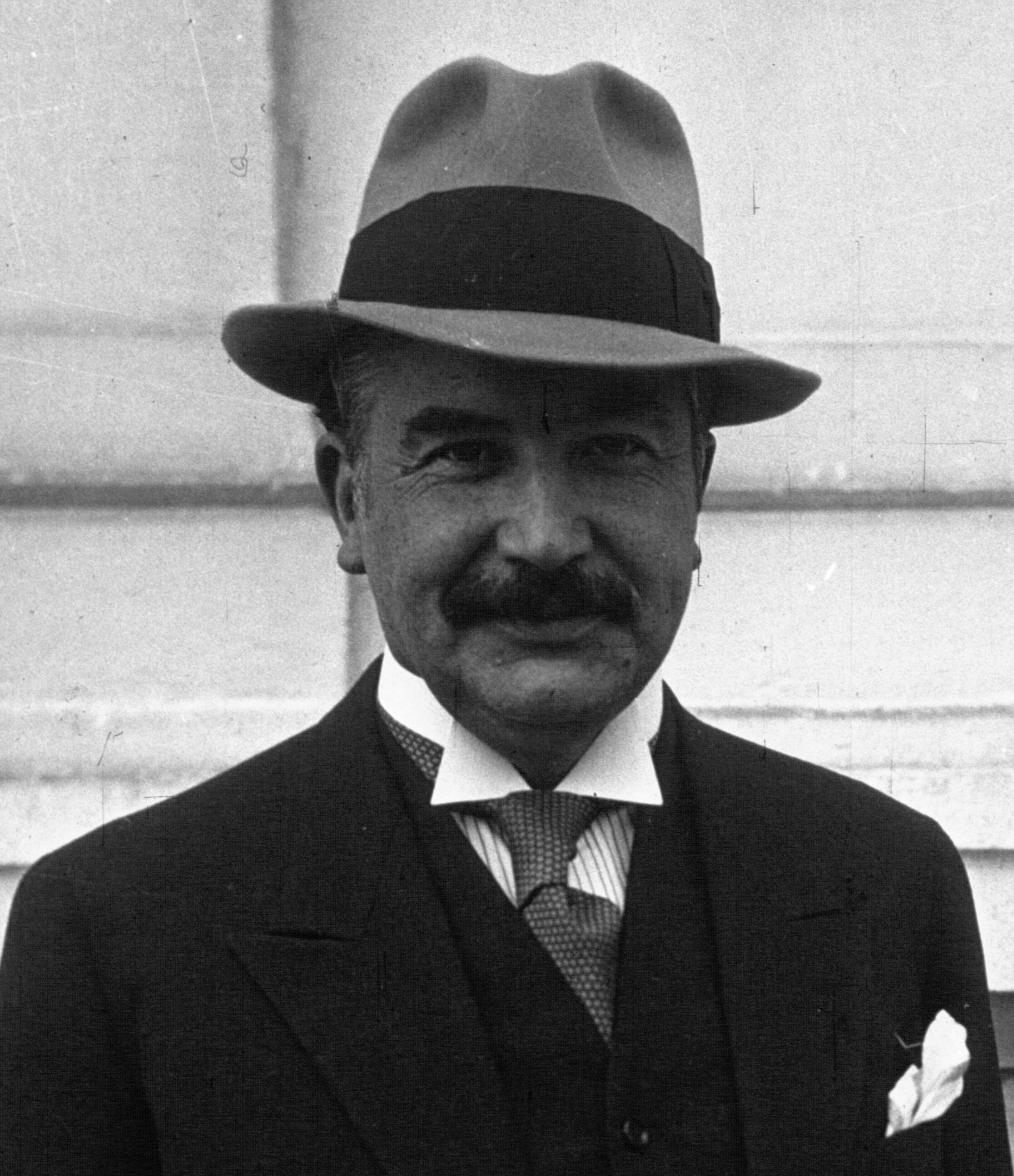
Joseph Bech

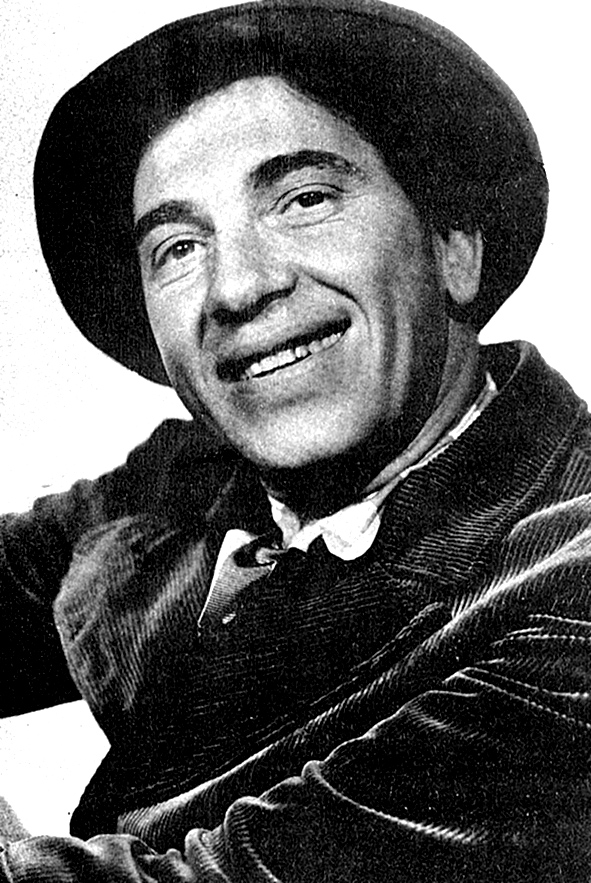
Chico Marx

- January 1
  - Wilhelm Canaris, head of German military intelligence in World War II (d. 1945)
  - Max Ritter von Müller, German World War I fighter ace (d. 1918)
- January 2 – Mayme Ousley, American politician and the first female mayor in Missouri history (d. 1970)
- January 3 – August Macke, German painter (d. 1914)
- January 3 – Radoslav Andrea Tsanoff, Bulgarian‑American philosopher and author (d. 1976)
- January 10 – Robinson Jeffers, American poet (d. 1962)
- January 13 – Jorge Chávez, Peruvian aviator (d. 1910)
- January 17 – Ola Raknes, Norwegian psychoanalyst, philologist (d. 1975)
- January 19 – Alexander Woollcott, American intellectual (d. 1943)
- January 23
  - Miklós Kállay, 34th prime minister of Hungary (d. 1967)
  - Dorothy Payne Whitney, American-born philanthropist, social activist (d. 1968)
- January 28 – Arthur Rubinstein, Polish-born pianist and conductor (d. 1982)
- February 2 – Ernst Hanfstaengl, German-born American businessman and politician (d. 1975)
- February 3 – Georg Trakl, Austrian poet (d. 1914)
- February 5 – Corneliu Dragalina, Romanian general (d. 1949)
- February 6 – Josef Frings, Archbishop of Cologne (d. 1978)
- February 12 – Edelmiro Julián Farrell, Argentine general, 28th President of Argentina (d. 1980)
- February 17
  - Joseph Bech, Luxembourgish politician, 2-time prime minister of Luxembourg (d. 1975)
  - Leevi Madetoja, Finnish composer (d. 1947)
- February 20 – Vincent Massey, Governor General of Canada (d. 1967)
- February 21 – Korechika Anami, Japanese general (d. 1945)

=== March–April ===
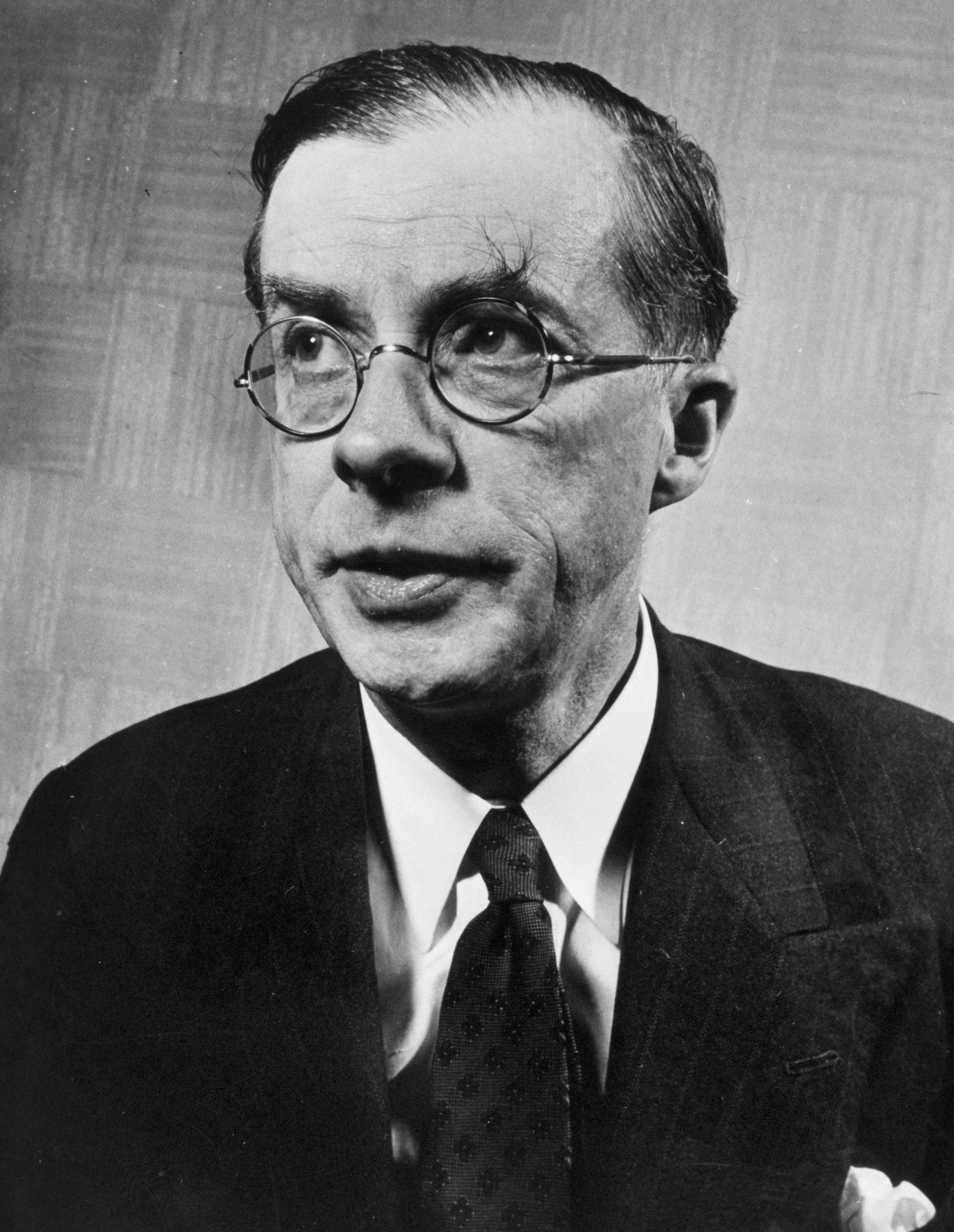
Julian Huxley

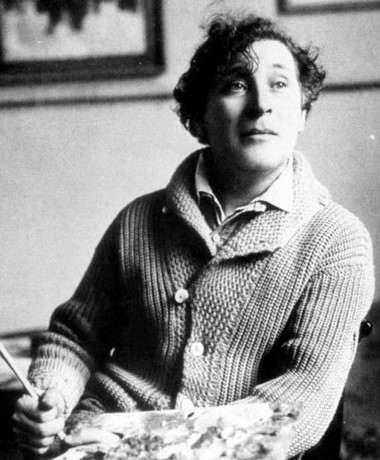
Marc Chagall

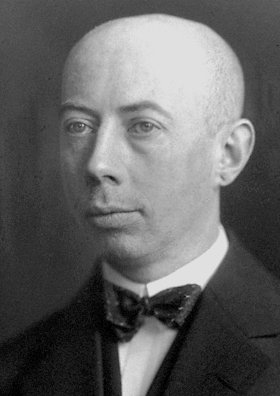
Gustav Ludwig Hertz

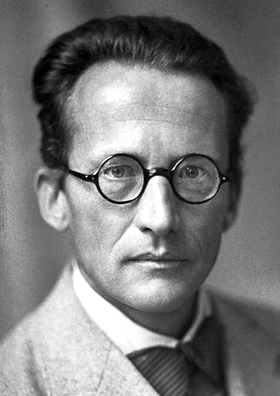
Erwin Schrödinger

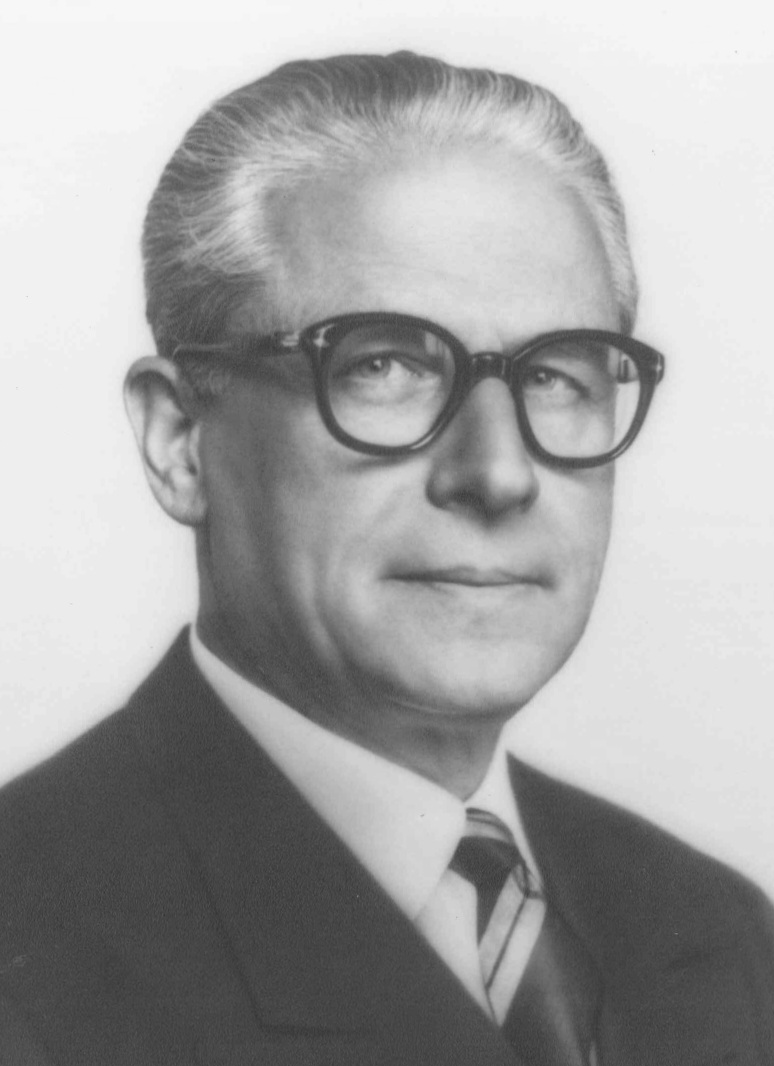
Giovanni Gronchi

- March 5 – Heitor Villa-Lobos, Brazilian composer (d. 1959)
- March 11 – Raoul Walsh, American film director (d. 1980)
- March 13 – Alexander Vandegrift, American general (d. 1973)
- March 14 – Sylvia Beach, American publisher in Paris (d. 1952)
- March 18 – Aurel Aldea, Romanian general and politician (d. 1949)
- March 21 – Luís Filipe, Prince Royal of Portugal (d. 1908)
- March 22 – Chico Marx, American comedian and actor (d. 1961)
- March 23
  - Juan Gris, Spanish-born painter, graphic artist (d. 1927)
  - Prince Felix Yusupov, Russian assassin of Rasputin (d. 1967)
- March 24 – Roscoe Arbuckle, American actor, comedian, film director, and screenwriter (d. 1933)
- March 25 – Chūichi Nagumo, Japanese admiral (d. 1944)
- April 3 – Nishizō Tsukahara, Japanese admiral (d. 1966)
- April 10 – Bernardo Houssay, Argentine physiologist, Nobel Prize laureate (d. 1971)
- April 12 – Harold Lockwood, American film actor (d.1918)
- April 22 – Harald Bohr, Danish mathematician and footballer (d. 1951)
- April 26 – Kojo Tovalou Houénou, Beninese critic of the French colonial empire in Africa (d. 1936)

=== May–June ===
- May 2
  - Vernon Castle, British-born American dancer (d. 1918)
  - Eddie Collins, American baseball player (d. 1951)
- May 5 – Geoffrey Fisher, Archbishop of Canterbury (d. 1972)
- May 11 – Paul Wittgenstein, Austrian-born pianist (d. 1951)
- May 15 – John H. Hoover, American admiral (d. 1970)
- May 22 – Jim Thorpe, American athlete (d. 1953)
- May 23 – C. R. M. F. Cruttwell, English historian (d. 1941)
- May 25 – Padre Pio, Italian saint (d. 1968)
- May 31 – Saint-John Perse, French diplomat, writer and Nobel Prize laureate (d. 1975)
- June 3 – Carlo Michelstaedter, Italian philosopher (d. 1910)
- June 4 – Tom Longboat, Canadian distance runner (d. 1949)
- June 5 – Ruth Benedict, American anthropologist (d. 1948)
- June 22 – Julian Huxley, British biologist (d. 1975)
- June 26 – Ganna Walska, Polish-born American opera singer and horticulturist (d. 1984)

=== July–August ===
- July 1 – Morton Deyo, American admiral (d. 1973)
- July 6 – Annette Kellermann, Australian swimmer and actress (d. 1975)
- July 7 – Marc Chagall, Russian-born French painter (d. 1985)
- July 9
  - Emilio Mola, Spanish Nationalist commander (d. 1937)
  - Samuel Eliot Morison, American historian (d. 1976)
- July 14 – Curtis Shake, American jurist (d. 1978)
- July 16 – Shoeless Joe Jackson, American baseball player (d. 1951)
- July 18 – Vidkun Quisling, Norwegian politician, traitor (d. 1945)
- July 21 – Luis A. Eguiguren, Peruvian historian and politician (d. 1967)
- July 22 – Gustav Ludwig Hertz, German physicist, Nobel Prize laureate (d. 1975)
- July 28 – Marcel Duchamp, French artist (d. 1968)
- July 29
  - Sigmund Romberg, Hungarian-born American composer (d. 1951)
  - Mamoru Shigemitsu, Japanese diplomat and politician (d. 1957)
- July 31 – Mitsuru Ushijima, Japanese general (d. 1945)
- August 3
  - Rupert Brooke, British war poet (d. 1915)
  - August Wesley, Finnish journalist, trade unionist, and revolutionary (d.?)
- August 6 – Oliver Wallace, English film composer (d. 1963)
- August 8 – Germaine Marie-Thérèse Hannevart, Belgian teacher, women's rights activist and peace campaigner (d. 1977)
- August 12 – Erwin Schrödinger, Austrian physicist, Nobel Prize laureate (d. 1961)
- August 17
  - Emperor Charles I of Austria (d. 1922)
  - Marcus Garvey, Jamaican-born American publisher, entrepreneur and Pan Africanist (d. 1940)
- August 22 – Walter Citrine, 1st Baron Citrine, British trade unionist (d. 1983)
- August 24 – Harry Hooper, American baseball player (d. 1974)

=== September–October ===
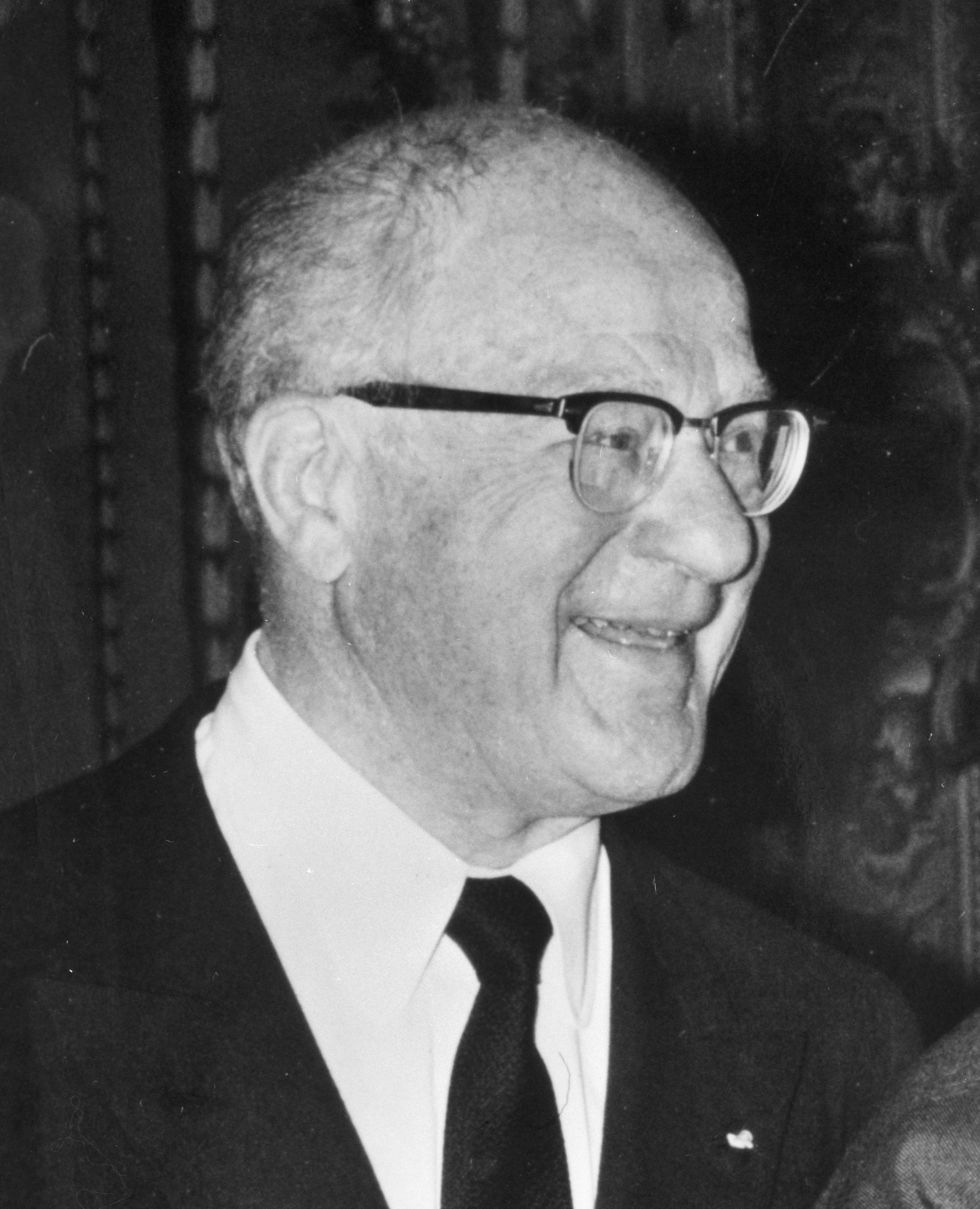
Avery Brundage

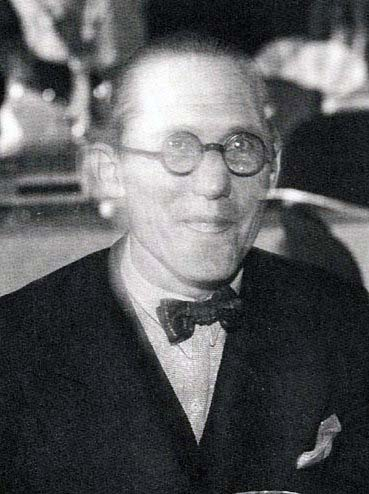
Le Corbusier

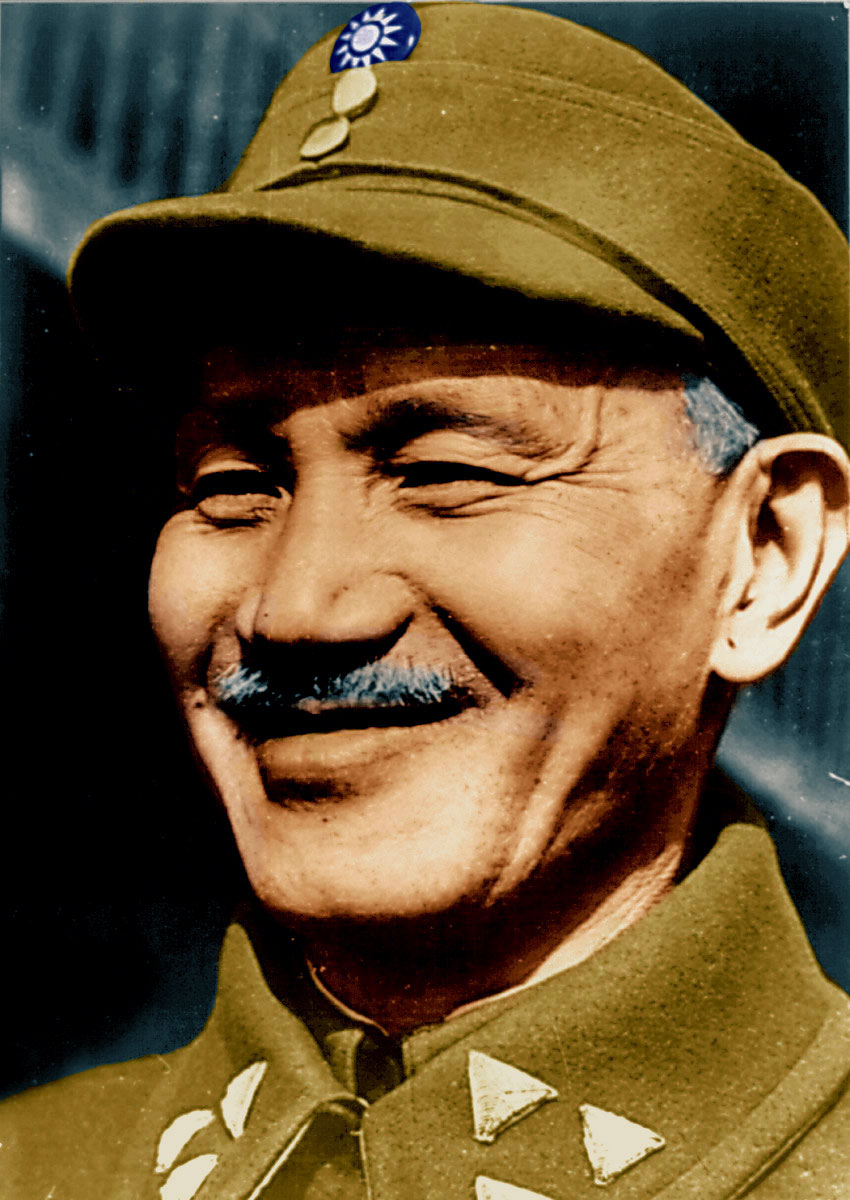
Chiang Kai-shek

- September 1 – Blaise Cendrars, Swiss writer (d. 1961)
- September 5 – Irene Fenwick, American actress (d. 1936)
- September 8 – Jacob L. Devers, American general (d. 1979)
- September 9 – Alf Landon, American Republican politician, presidential candidate (d. 1987)
- September 10 – Giovanni Gronchi, 3rd president of Italy (d. 1978)
- September 12 – Yusif Vazir Chamanzaminli, Azerbaijani statesman, writer and claimed "core author" of novel Ali and Nino (d. in Gulag 1943)
- September 13
  - Lancelot Holland, British admiral (d. 1941)
  - Leopold Ružička, Croatian chemist, Nobel Prize laureate (d. 1976)
- September 16 – Nadia Boulanger, French composer and composition teacher (d. 1979)
- September 26 – William Barnard Rhodes-Moorhouse, British aviator, first airman to receive the Victoria Cross (d. 1915)
- September 28 – Avery Brundage, American sports official, 5th President of the International Olympic Committee (d. 1975)
- October 2 – Violet Jessop, Argentine-born British RMS Titanic survivor (d. 1971)
- October 4 – Charles Alan Pownall, American admiral, 3rd Military Governor of Guam (d. 1975)
- October 5 – René Cassin, French judge, recipient of the Nobel Peace Prize (d. 1976)
- October 6 – Le Corbusier, Swiss architect (d. 1965)
- October 13 – Jozef Tiso, Prime Minister of Slovakia (d. 1947)
- October 20 – Prince Yasuhiko Asaka, Japanese prince (d. 1981)
- October 22 – John Reed, American journalist (d. 1920)
- October 23 – Lothar Rendulic, Austrian-born German general (d. 1971)
- October 24 – Victoria Eugenie of Battenberg, Queen Consort of Spain (d. 1969)
- October 31 – Chiang Kai-shek, 1st president of the Republic of China (d. 1975)

=== November–December ===
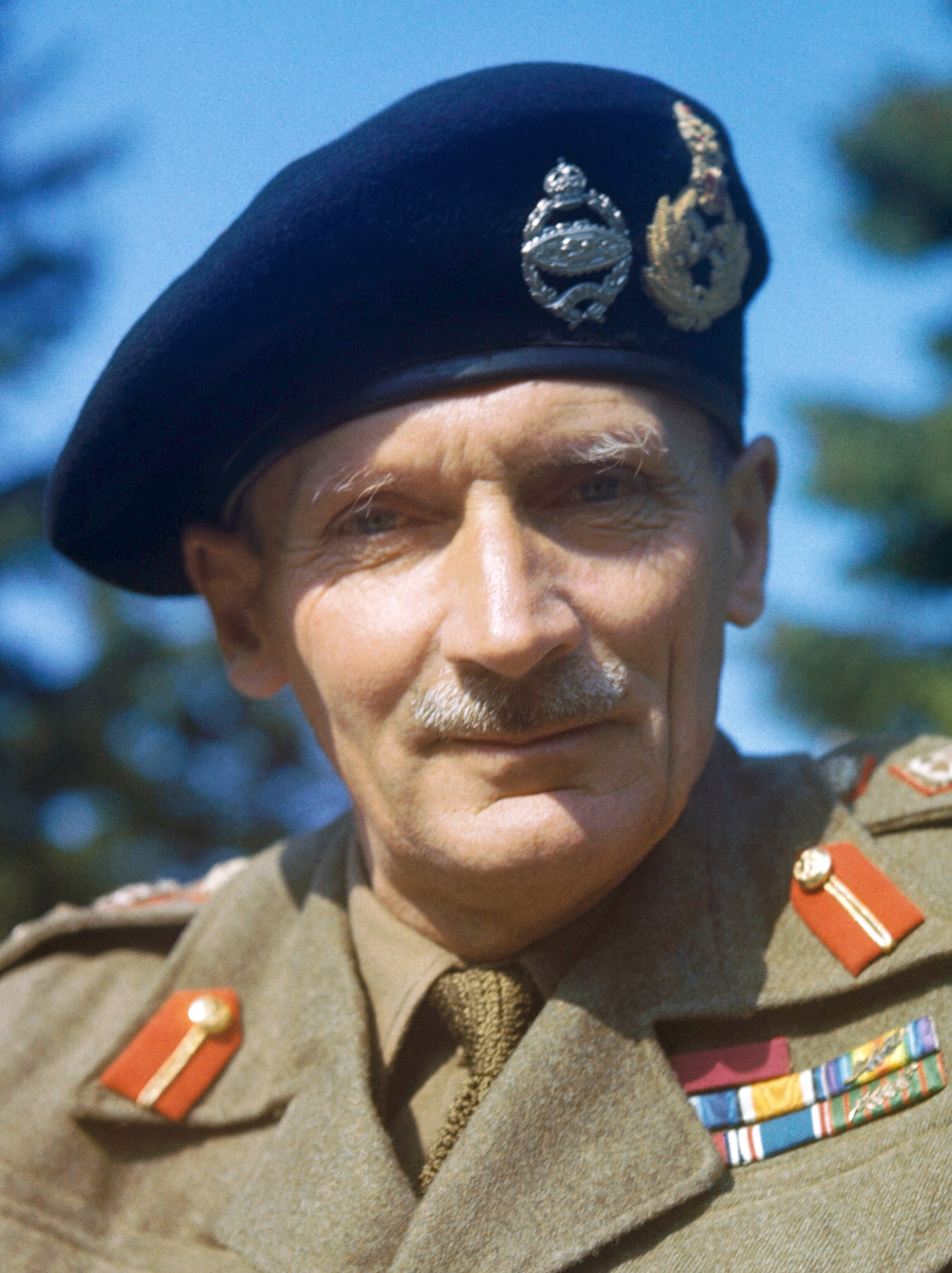
Bernard Montgomery

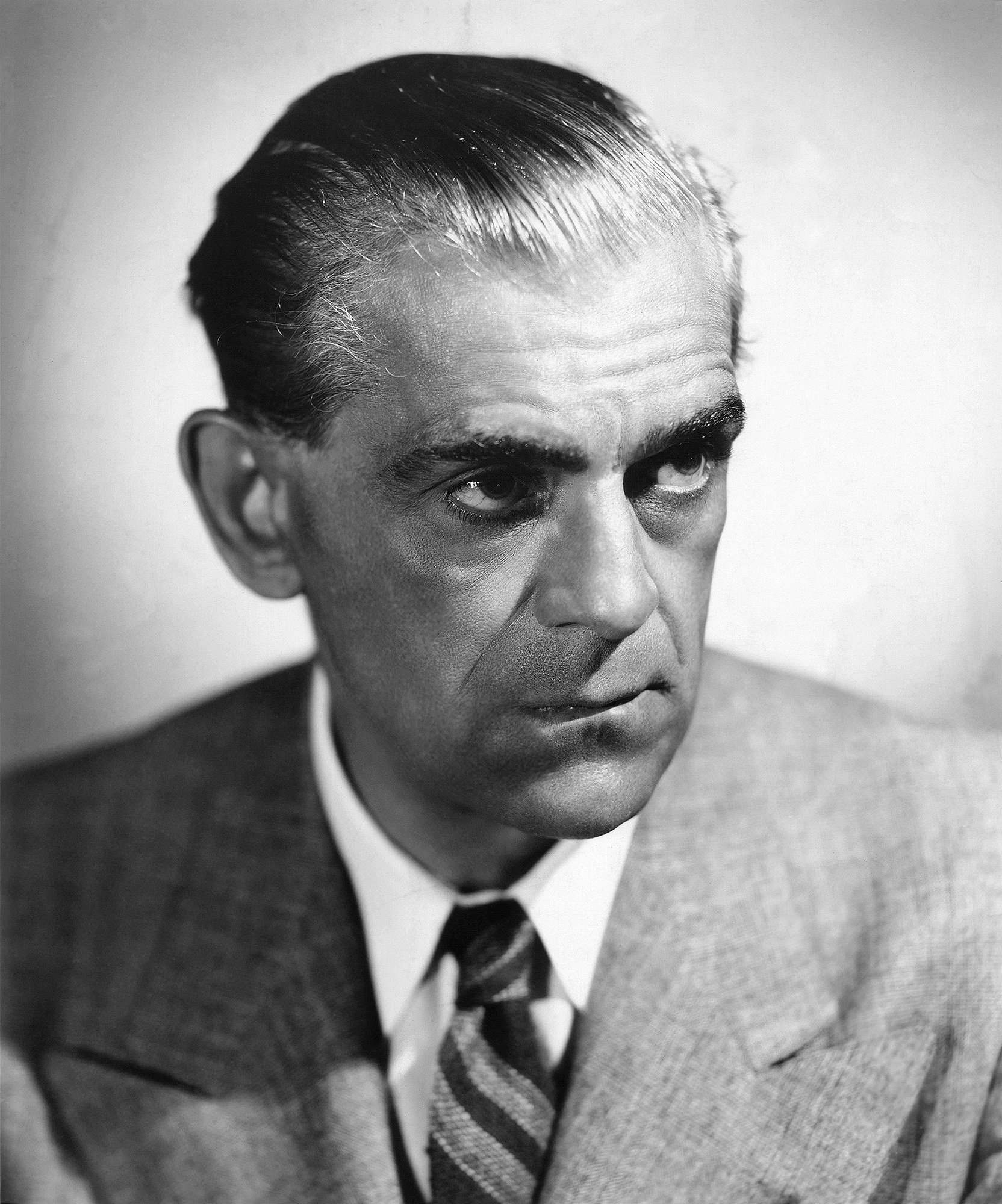
Boris Karloff

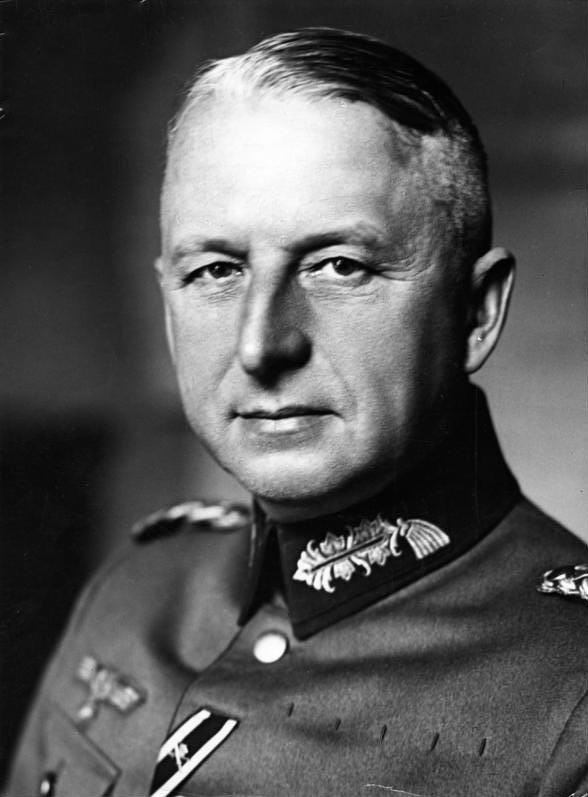
Erich von Manstein

- November 1 – L. S. Lowry, English painter (d. 1976)
- November 6 – Walter Johnson, American baseball player (d. 1946)
- November 10 – Arnold Zweig, German writer (d. 1968)
- November 11 – Roland Young, English actor (d. 1953)
- November 14 – Amadeo de Souza Cardoso, Portuguese painter (d. 1918)
- November 15 – Georgia O'Keeffe, American painter (d. 1986)
- November 17 – Bernard Montgomery, British World War II commander (d. 1976)
- November 19 – James B. Sumner, American chemist, Nobel Prize laureate (d. 1955)
- November 23
  - Boris Karloff, British horror film actor (d. 1969)
  - Henry Moseley, English physicist (d. 1915)
- November 24 – Erich von Manstein, German field marshal (d. 1973)
- November 25 – Nikolai Vavilov, Russian and Soviet agronomist, botanist and geneticist (d. 1943)
- November 27 – Masaharu Homma, Japanese general (d. 1946)
- November 28
  - Jacobo Palm, Curaçao-born composer (d. 1982)
  - Ernst Röhm, German Nazi SA leader (d. 1934)
- December 3 – Prince Naruhiko Higashikuni, prime minister of Japan (d. 1990)
- December 6 – Lynn Fontanne, British actress (d. 1983)
- December 12 – Kurt Atterberg, Swedish composer (d. 1974)
- December 13 – Alvin York, American World War I hero (d. 1964)
- December 16 – Adone Zoli, Italian politician, 35th Prime Minister of Italy (d. 1960)
- December 22 – Srinivasa Ramanujan, Indian mathematician (d. 1920)
- December 25 – Conrad Hilton, American hotelier (d. 1979)
- December 26 – Arthur Percival, British general (d. 1966)

1888

=== January–February ===
Carlos Quintanilla

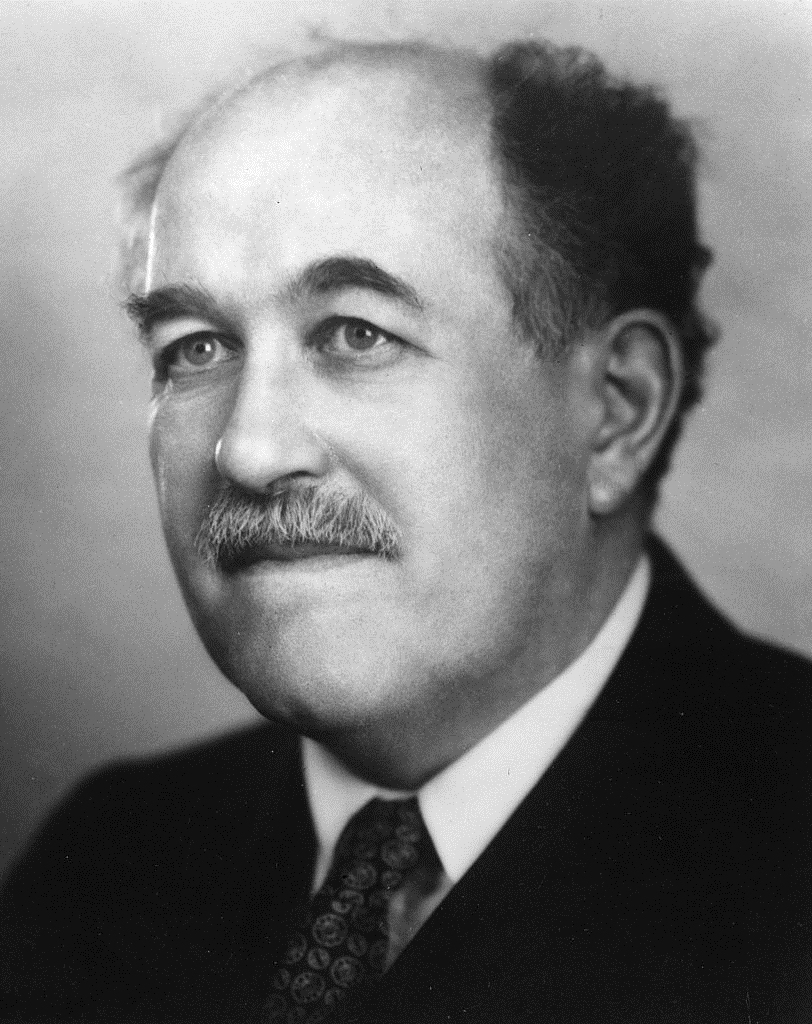
Otto Stern

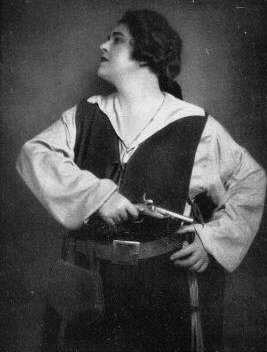
Lotte Lehmann

- January 1 – Victor Goldschmidt, Swiss geochemist (d. 1947)
- January 8 – Matt Moore, Irish-born American actor (d. 1960)
- January 18 – Thomas Sopwith, English aviation pioneer, yachtsman (d. 1989)
- January 19 – Millard Harmon, American general (d. 1945)
- January 20 – Lead Belly, American folk, blues singer (d. 1949)
- January 22 – Carlos Quintanilla, 37th President of Bolivia (d. 1964)
- January 23 – Aritomo Gotō, Japanese admiral (d. 1942)
- January 24
  - Vicki Baum, Austrian writer (d. 1960)
  - Ernst Heinkel, German aircraft designer (d. 1958)
- January 29 – Wellington Koo, Chinese statesman (d. 1985)
- February 2 – Frederick Lane, Australian swimmer (d. 1969)
- February 5 – Bruce Fraser, British admiral (d. 1981)
- February 6 – Nell W. Walker, American politician from West Virginia (d. 1962)
- February 8 – Edith Evans, British actress (d. 1976)
- February 11 – John Warren Davis, American educator, college administrator, and civil rights leader (d. 1980)
- February 13 – Georgios Papandreou, Prime Minister of Greece (d. 1968)
- February 14 – Chandrashekhar Agashe, Indian industrialist (d. 1956)
- February 17 – Otto Stern, German physicist, Nobel Prize laureate (d. 1969)
- February 19
  - Tom Phillips, British admiral (d. 1941)
  - Aurora Quezon, First Lady of the Philippines (d. 1949)
- February 20 – Georges Bernanos, French writer (d. 1948)
- February 25 – John Foster Dulles, United States Secretary of State (d. 1959)
- February 27
  - Lotte Lehmann, German singer (d. 1976)
  - Arthur Schlesinger Sr., American historian (d. 1965)

=== March–April ===
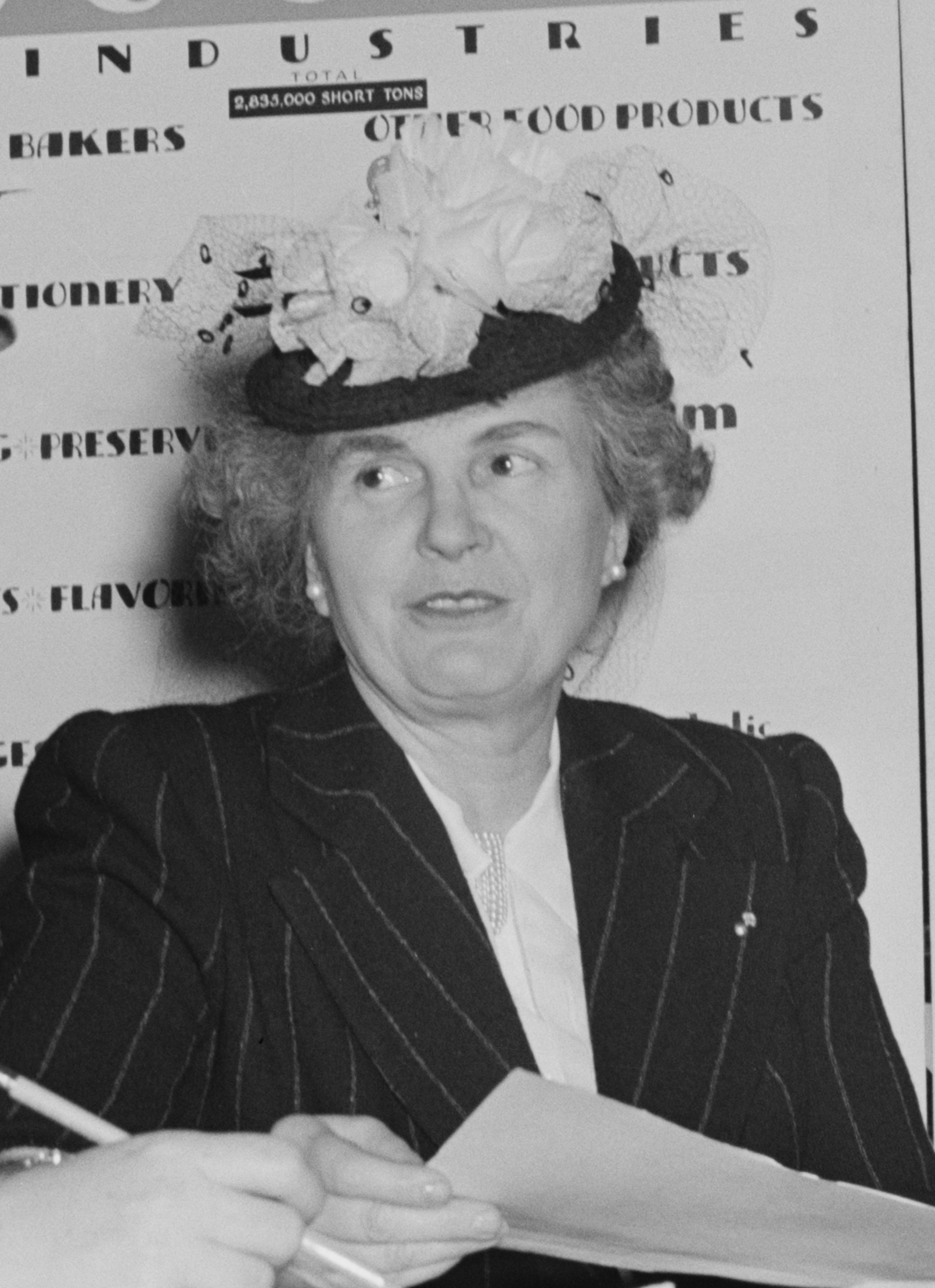
Ilo Wallace

- March 4 – Knute Rockne, American football player, coach (d. 1931)
- March 5 – Peg Leg Howell, American country blues singer-songwriter and guitarist (d. 1966)
- March 7 – William L. Laurence, American journalist (d. 1977)
- March 10
  - Barry Fitzgerald, Irish actor (d. 1961)
  - Ilo Wallace, Second Lady of the United States (d. 1981)
- March 17– Paul Ramadier, 63rd Prime Minister of France (d. 1961)
- March 18– Jerry Dawson, English footballer, Burnley and national team (d. 1970)
- March 25 – Timothy Detudamo, Nauruan Head Chief (d. 1953)
- March 26 – Elsa Brändström, Swedish nurse (d. 1948)
- March 29 – Enea Bossi Sr., Italian-born American aerospace engineer, aviation pioneer (d. 1963)
- March 30 – Anna Q. Nilsson, Swedish-American silent film star (d. 1974)
- April 1 – Terry de la Mesa Allen Sr., American general (d. 1969)
- April 2 – Sir Neville Cardus, British cricket, music writer (d. 1975)
- April 3 – Thomas C. Kinkaid, American admiral (d. 1972)
- April 4 – Tris Speaker, American professional baseball player, member of the Baseball Hall of Fame (d. 1958)
- April 6
  - Hans Richter, German artist and filmmaker (d. 1976)
  - Gerhard Ritter, German historian (d. 1967)
- April 12 – Carlos Julio Arosemena Tola, 28th president of Ecuador (d. 1952)
- April 18 – Duffy Lewis, American Major League Baseball player (d. 1979)
- April 26 – Anita Loos, American writer (d. 1981)
- April 27 – Florence La Badie, Canadian actress (d. 1917)

=== May–June ===
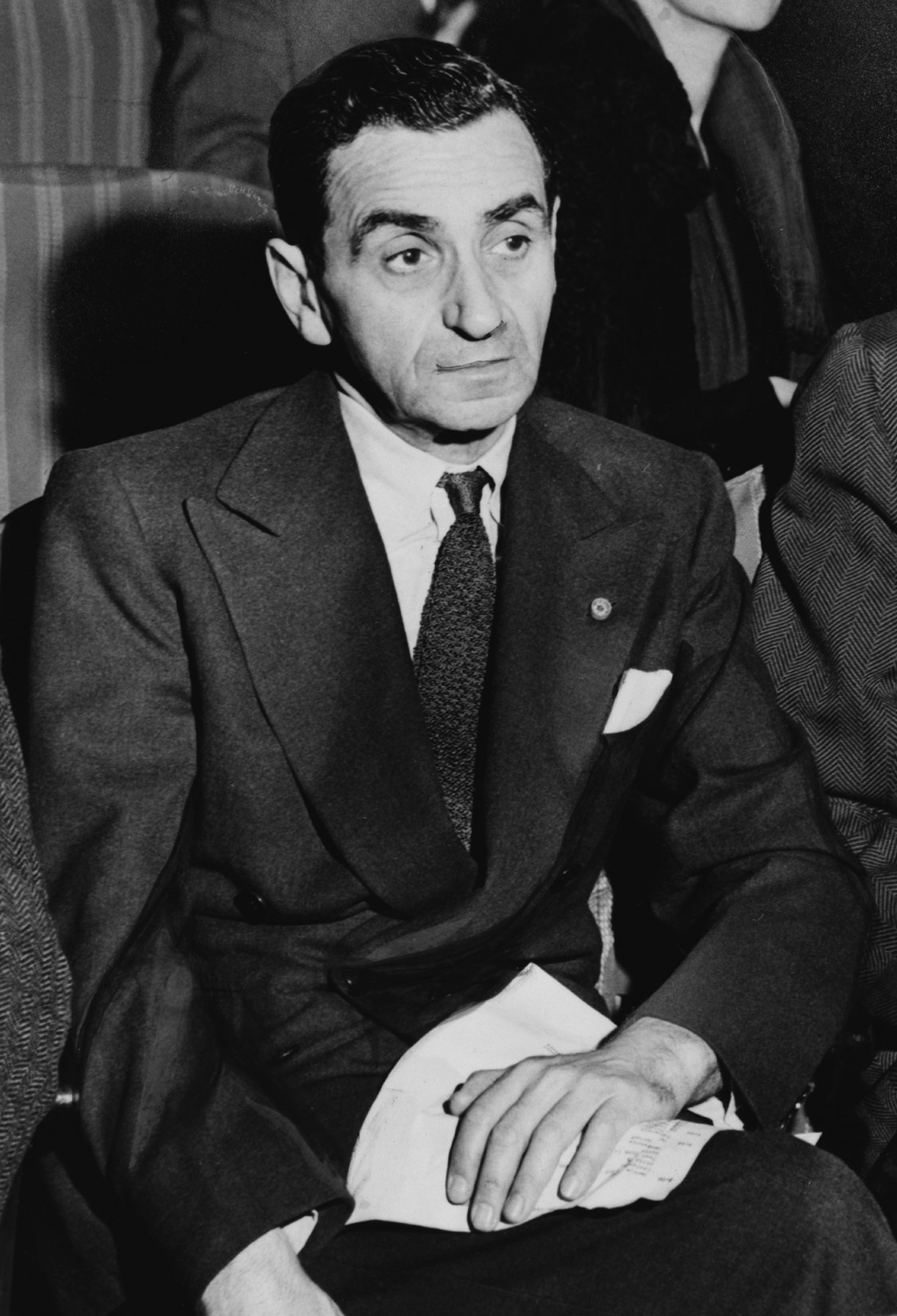
Irving Berlin

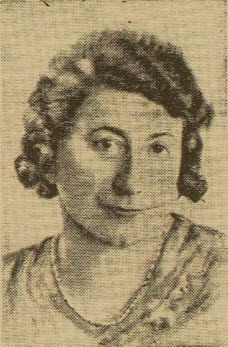
Lucie Randoin

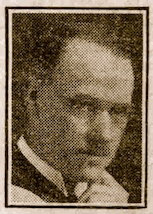
David Dougal Williams

- May 8 – Maurice Boyau, French World War I fighter ace (d. 1918)
- May 9 – Francesco Baracca, Italian World War I fighter ace (d. 1918)
- May 10 – Max Steiner, Austrian-American composer (d. 1971)
- May 11
  - Irving Berlin, American composer (d. 1989)
  - Willis Augustus Lee, American admiral (d. 1945)
  - Lucie Randoin, French biologist, nutritionist, expert in dietary significance of vitamins (d. 1960)
- May 13 – Inge Lehmann, Danish seismologist, geophysicist (d. 1993)
- May 17 – Tich Freeman, English cricketer (d. 1965)
- May 18 – William Hood Simpson, American general (d. 1980)
- May 23 – Zack Wheat, American Baseball Hall of Famer (d. 1972)
- May 25 – Miles Malleson, English actor (d. 1969)
- May 26 – Anne Azgapetian, Russian Red Cross worker (d. 1973)
- May 28 – Kaarel Eenpalu, 7th Prime Minister of Estonia (d. 1942)
- May 31 – Jack Holt, American actor (d. 1951)
- June – David Dougal Williams, British painter and art teacher (d. 1944)
- June 13 – Fernando Pessoa, Portuguese writer (d. 1935)
- June 17 – Heinz Guderian, German general (d. 1954)
- June 22
  - Milton Allen, Governor of Saint Christopher-Nevis-Anguilla (d. 1981)
  - Harold Hitz Burton, American politician, Associate Justice of the Supreme Court of the United States (d. 1964)
- June 24 – Gerrit Rietveld, Dutch architect (d. 1964)
- June 27 – Antoinette Perry, American stage director for whom the Tony Award is named (d. 1946)
- June 29 – Squizzy Taylor, Australian gangster (d. 1927)

=== July–August ===
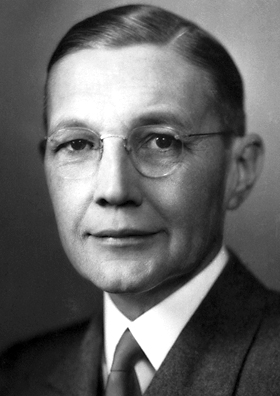
Herbert Spencer Gasser

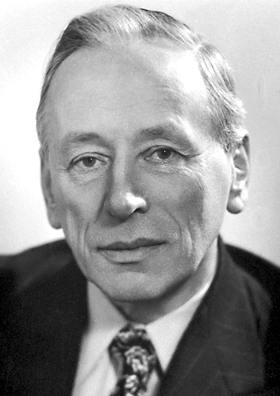
Frits Zernike

- July 5 – Herbert Spencer Gasser, American physiologist, Nobel Prize laureate (d. 1963)
- July 10 – Giorgio de Chirico, Italian painter (d. 1978)
- July 16
  - Percy Kilbride, American actor (d. 1964)
  - Frits Zernike, Dutch physicist, Nobel Prize laureate (d. 1966)
- July 17 – Shmuel Yosef Agnon, Israeli writer, Nobel Prize laureate (d. 1970)
- July 22 – Selman Waksman, Ukrainian-born American biochemist, recipient of the Nobel Prize in Physiology or Medicine (d. 1973)
- July 23 – Raymond Chandler, American-born novelist (d. 1959)
- July 25 – Johannes Spieß, German U-boat commander during World War I (d. 1972)
- August 4 – Taher Saifuddin, Indian Bohra spiritual leader (d. 1965)
- August 6 – Heinrich Schlusnus, German baritone (d. 1952)
- August 9
  - Auguste Cornu, French Marxist philosopher and historian of philosophy (d. 1981)
  - Eduard Ritter von Schleich, German fighter ace, air force general (d. 1947)
- August 13 – John Logie Baird, Scottish inventor (d. 1946)
- August 16 – T. E. Lawrence ("Lawrence of Arabia"), British liaison officer during the Arab Revolt, writer and academic (d. 1935)
- August 17
  - Pieter van der Hoog, Dutch bacteriologist, dermatologist, and Islamicist (d. 1957)
  - Monty Woolley, American actor (d. 1963)
- August 20 – Tôn Đức Thắng, 2nd president of Vietnam (d. 1980)
- August 25 – Inayatullah Khan Mashriqi, Pakistani scholar, politician (d. 1963)
- August 28 – Evadne Price, Australian-British writer, actress and astrologer (d. 1985)
- August 29 – Gunichi Mikawa, Japanese admiral (d. 1981)

=== September–October ===
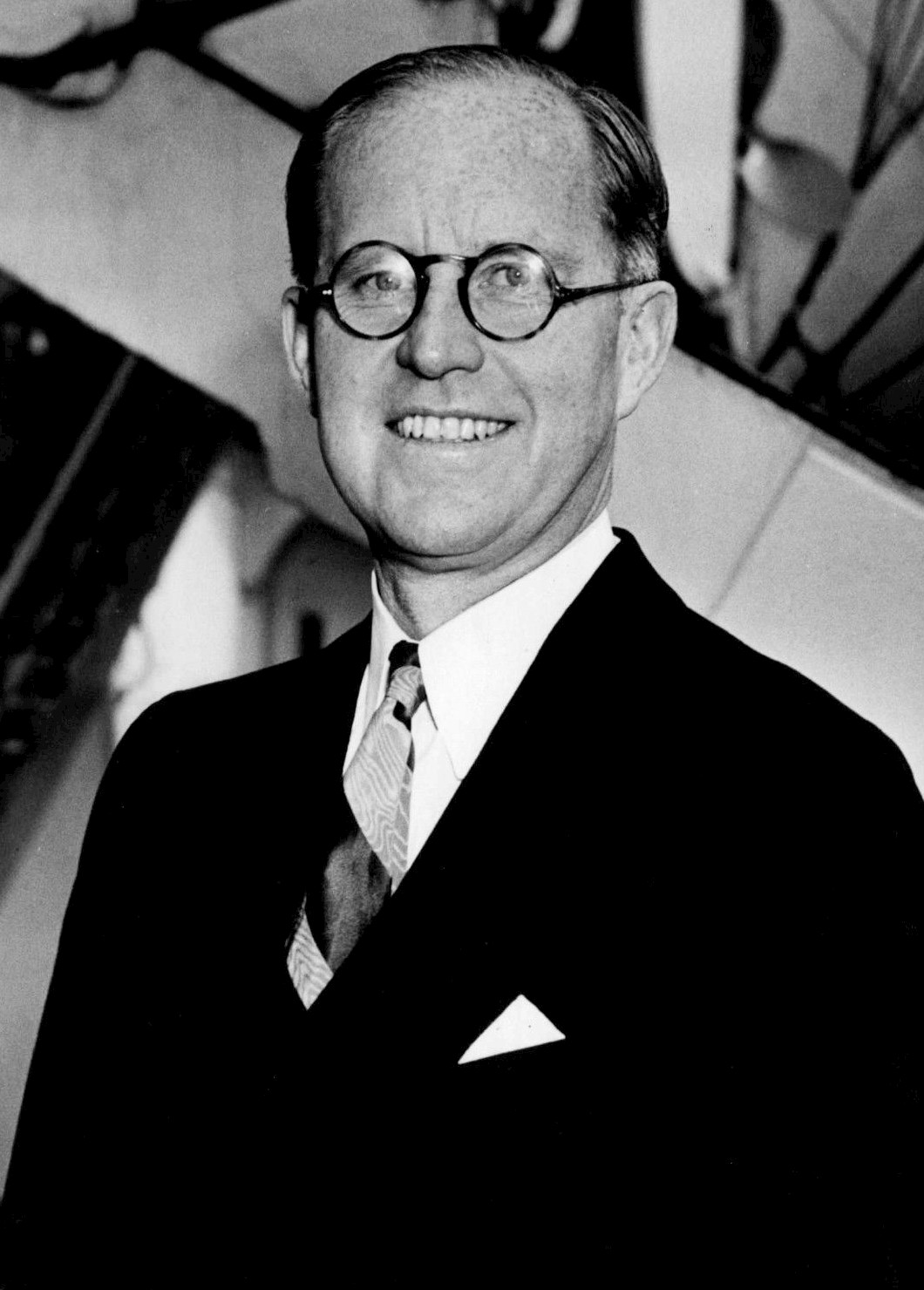
Joseph P. Kennedy Sr.

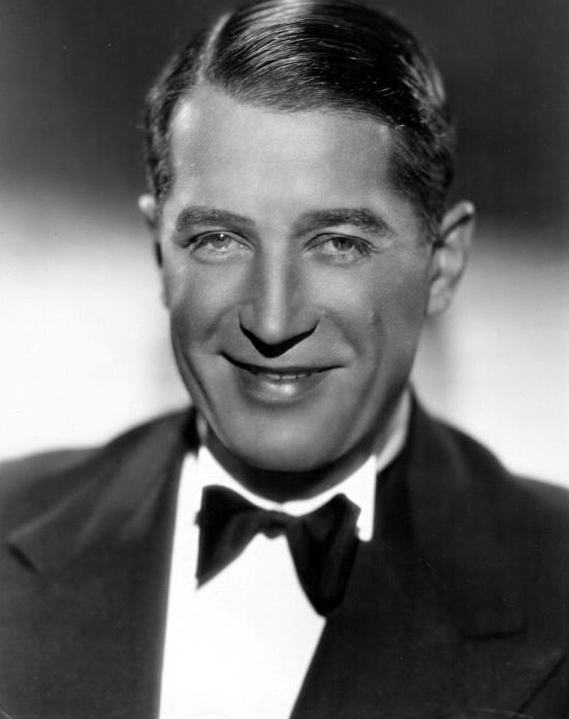
Maurice Chevalier

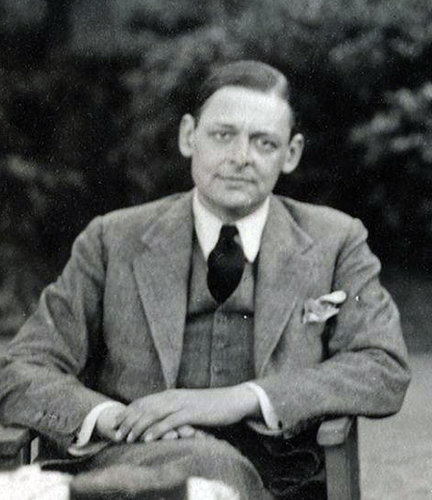
T. S. Eliot

- September 2, Helen Clay Frick, American philanthropist and art collector (d. 1984)
- September 5 – Sarvepalli Radhakrishnan, Indian philosopher, politician and 2nd President of India (d. 1975)
- September 6
  - Joseph P. Kennedy Sr., American politician (d. 1969)
  - Zeng Junchen, Chinese drug baron (d. 1964)
- September 8 – Ida McNeil, American broadcaster and designer of the flag of South Dakota (d. 1974)
- September 12 – Maurice Chevalier, French singer and actor (d. 1972)
- September 16
  - Frans Eemil Sillanpää, Finnish writer, Nobel Prize laureate (d. 1964)
  - W. O. Bentley, English engineer, entrepreneur (d. 1971)
- September 17 – Michiyo Tsujimura, Japanese agricultural scientist (d. 1969)
- September 18 – Grey Owl, British conservationist, impostor, writer (d. 1938)
- September 20 – John Painter, American supercentenarian, world's oldest man between 1999 and 2001 (d. 2001)
- September 26
  - J. Frank Dobie, American folklorist, journalist (d. 1964)
  - T. S. Eliot, American-born British poet, Nobel Prize laureate (d. 1965)
- September 28 – Seán Lester, Irish diplomat (d. 1959)
- October 4 – Friedrich Olbricht, German general (d. 1944)
- October 6 – Roland Garros, French pilot (killed in action 1918)
- October 7
  - Renya Mutaguchi, Japanese general (d. 1966)
  - Henry A. Wallace, 33rd Vice President of the United States (d. 1965)
- October 8 – Ernst Kretschmer, German psychiatrist (d. 1964)
- October 9 – Nikolai Bukharin, Russian Bolshevik and Soviet politician (d. 1938)
- October 14 – Katherine Mansfield, New Zealand fiction writer (d. 1923)
- October 16
  - Eugene O'Neill, American playwright, Nobel Prize laureate (d. 1953)
  - Paul Popenoe, American eugenicist (d. 1979)
  - Mikhail Kaganovich, Soviet politician (d. 1941)
- October 17 – Paul Bernays, Swiss mathematician (d. 1977)
- October 24 – Carlo Bergamini, Italian admiral (d. 1943)
- October 25 – Lester Cuneo, American actor (d. 1925)
- October 30 – Alan Goodrich Kirk, American admiral (d. 1963)
- October 31 – Hubert Wilkins, Australian explorer of the Arctic (d. 1958)

=== November–December ===
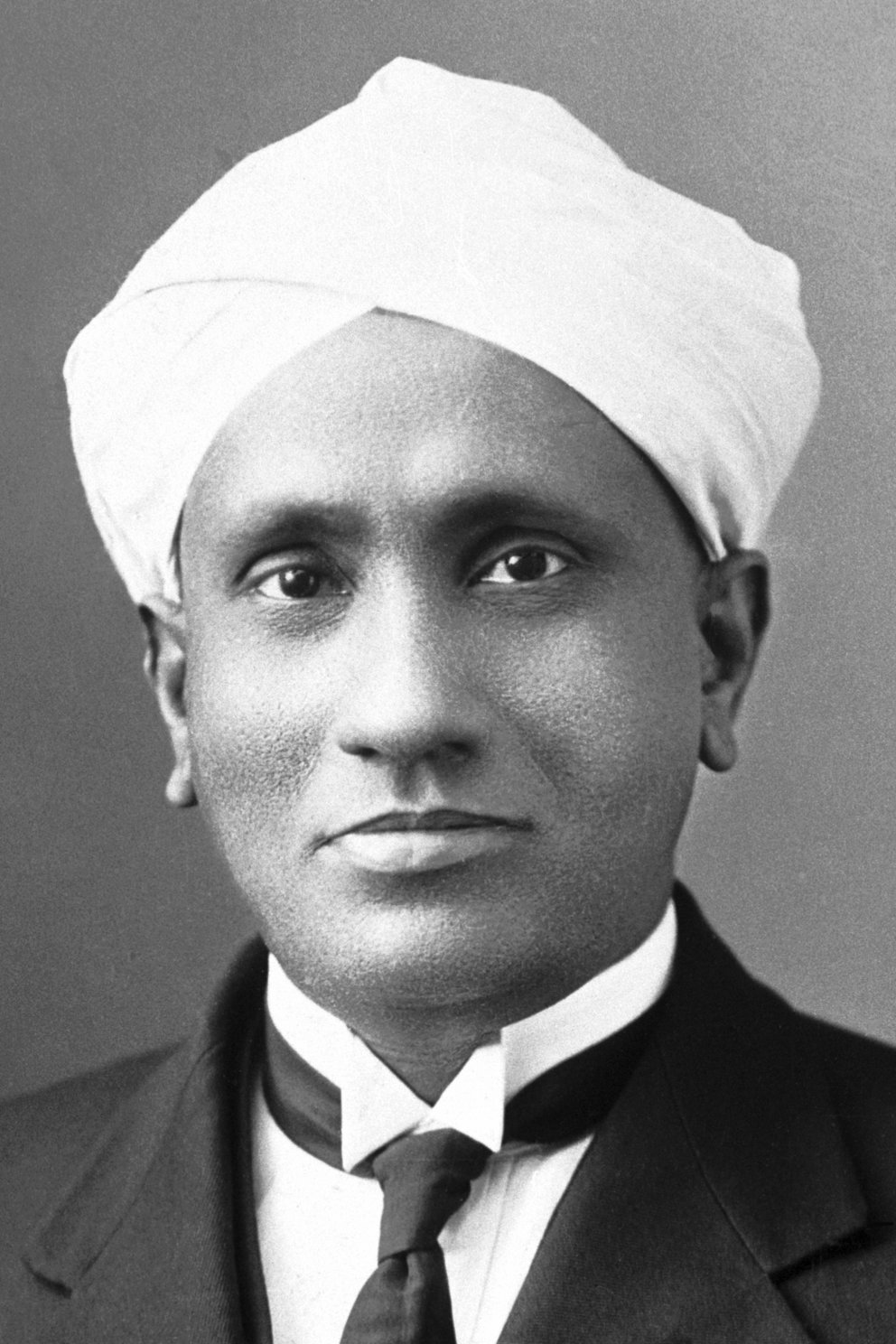
C. V. Raman

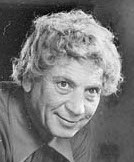
Harpo Marx

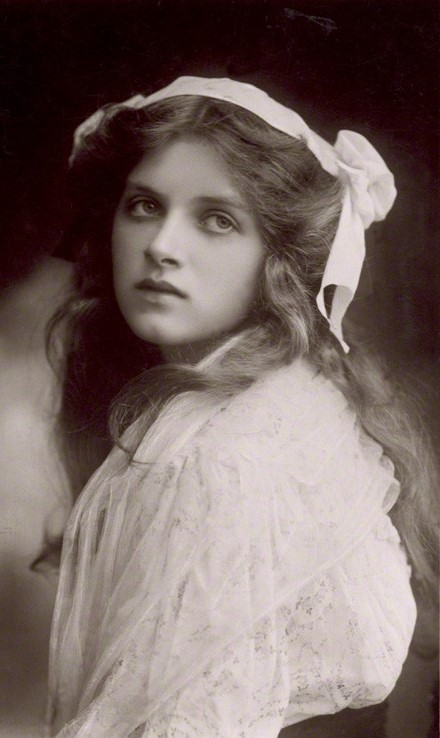
Gladys Cooper

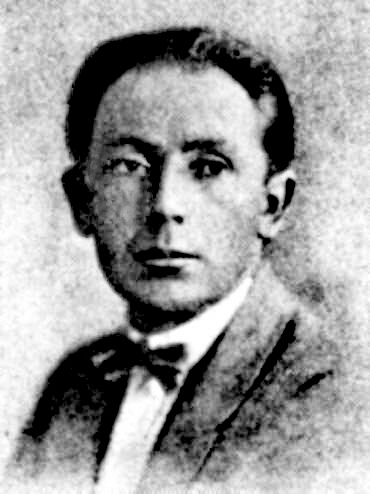
F. W. Murnau

- November 1 – Viliami Tungī Mailefihi, 7th Premier of Tonga (d. 1941)
- November 7
  - Nestor Makhno, Ukrainian anarcho-communist revolutionary (d. 1934)
  - C. V. Raman, Indian physicist, Nobel Prize laureate (d. 1970)
- November 9 – Jean Monnet, French political economist, diplomat and a founding father of the European Union (d. 1979)
- November 11 – Maulana Azad, Indian Independence movement activist,writer,statesman and one of the pioneer of Hindu Muslim unity.
- November 15
  - José Raúl Capablanca, Cuban World chess champion (1921–1927) (d. 1942)
  - Harald Sverdrup, Norwegian scientist (d. 1957)
- November 23 – Harpo Marx, American comedian (d. 1964)
- November 24
  - Dale Carnegie, American writer, lecturer (d. 1955)
  - Cathleen Nesbitt, British actress (d. 1982)
- November 29 – Oswald Rayner, British MI6 agent (d. 1961)
- November 30 – Ralph Hartley, American electronics researcher, inventor (d. 1970)
- December 3 – Yitzhak HaLevi Herzog, Polish-born Chief Rabbi of Ireland and Israel (d. 1959)
- December 4
  - Alexander I of Yugoslavia (d. 1934)
  - Donald B. Beary, American admiral (d. 1966)
- December 6 – Will Hay, British actor, comedian (d. 1949)
- December 7
  - Joyce Cary, Northern Irish author (d. 1957)
  - Jinichi Kusaka, Japanese admiral (d. 1972)
- December 16 – Alphonse Juin, French general, Marshal of France (d. 1967)
- December 18
  - Dame Gladys Cooper, English actress (d. 1971)
  - Robert Moses, American civil engineer, public works director, highway and bridge builder (d. 1981)
- December 19 – Fritz Reiner, Hungarian conductor (d. 1963)
- December 22 – Theodore Stark Wilkinson, American admiral (d. 1946)
- December 25 – Bonita Wa Wa Calachaw Nuñez, American painter (d. 1972)
- December 28 – F. W. Murnau, German film director (d. 1931)
- December 29 – Josef Beran, Czechoslovak cardinal and archbishop (d. 1969)

=== Date unknown ===
- Ibrahim Hashem, 3-time prime minister of Jordan (d. 1958)

1889

=== January ===
- January 2 – Walter Baldwin, American actor (d. 1977)
- January 12 – Mirza Basheer-ud-Din Mahmood Ahmad, 2nd Caliph of Ahmadiyya Muslim Community in Islam (d. 1965)
- January 21 – Edith Tolkien, English wife of, and inspiration for, J. R. R. Tolkien (d. 1971)

=== February ===
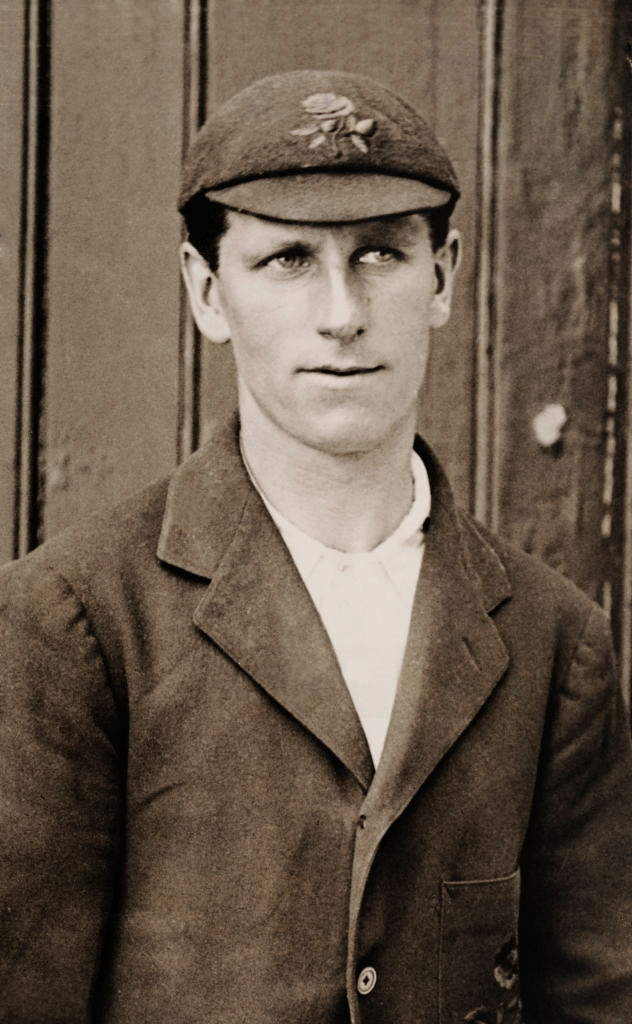
Ernest Tyldesley

- February 2 – Jean de Lattre de Tassigny, French general, posthumous Marshal of France (d. 1952)
- February 3 – Risto Ryti, Prime Minister and President of Finland (d. 1956)
- February 5 – Ernest Tyldesley, English cricketer (d. 1962)
- February 7 – Harry Nyquist, Swedish-American contributor to information theory (d. 1976)
- February 12 - Bhante Dharmawara, Cambodian-American Buddhist monk (d. 1999)
- February 16 – Hawthorne C. Gray, American balloonist (d. 1927)
- February 19 – Ernest Marsden, British physicist (d. 1970)
- February 21 – Pieter Voltelyn Graham van der Byl, South African politician (d. 1975)
- February 22
  - Olave Baden-Powell, English founder of the Girl Guides (d. 1977)
  - R. G. Collingwood, English philosopher and historian (d. 1943)
- February 23 – Victor Fleming, American motion picture director (d. 1949)
- February 25 – Homer S. Ferguson, American politician (d. 1982)

=== March ===
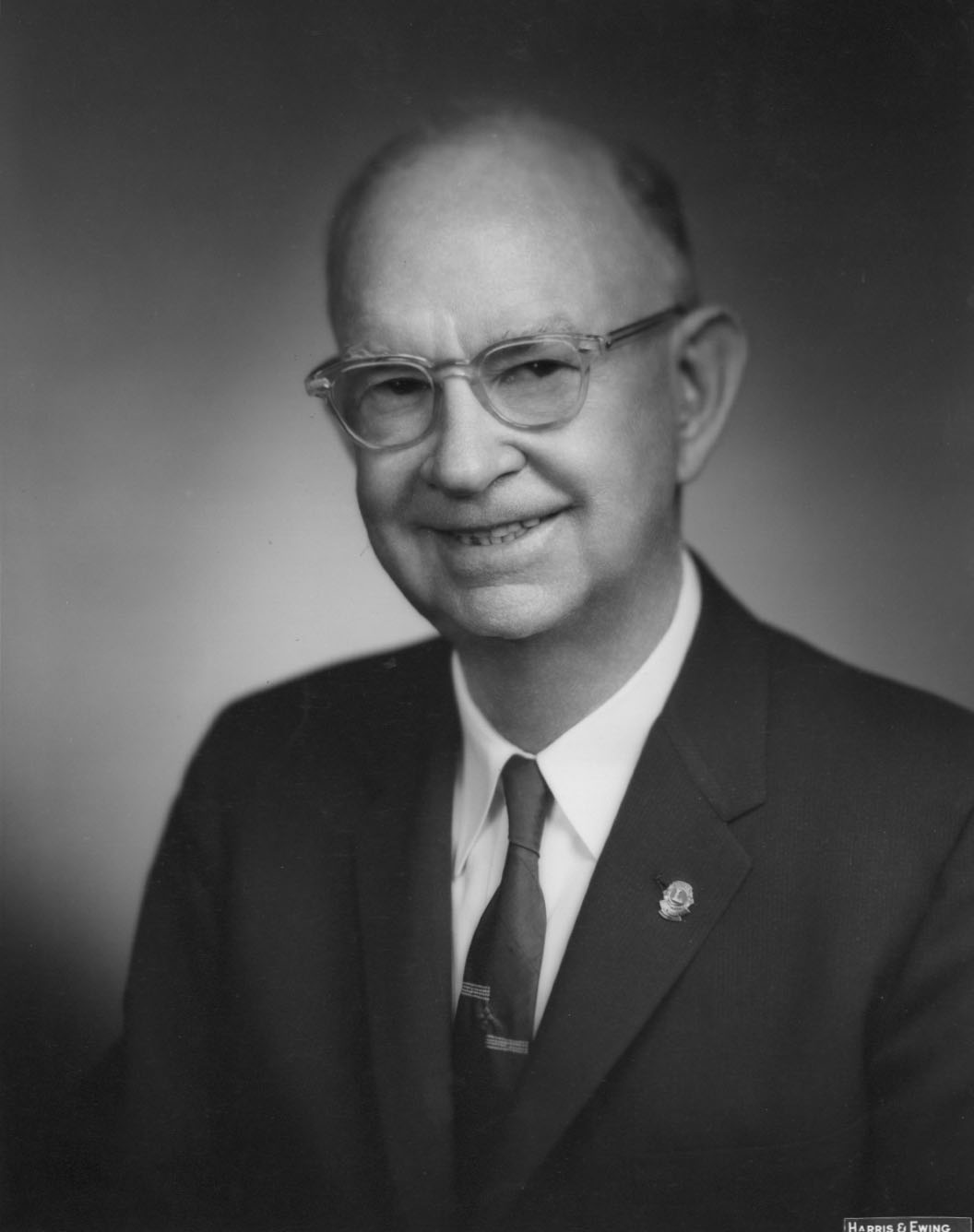
Oren E. Long

- March 1
  - Kanoko Okamoto, Japanese novelist, poet and Buddhist scholar (d. 1939)
  - Watsuji Tetsuro, Japanese philosopher (d. 1960)
- March 4
  - Oren E. Long, American politician, 10th Governor of Hawai'i (d. 1965)
  - Pearl White, American silent film actress (d. 1938)
- March 15 – Hiroaki Abe, Japanese admiral (d. 1949)
- March 16 – Reggie Walker, South African sprinter (d. 1951)
- March 21 –
  - Aleksandr Vertinsky, Russian singer, actor (d. 1957)
  - Bernard Freyberg, 1st Baron Freyberg, British army general and Governor-General of New Zealand (d. 1963)
- March 24 –
  - Albert Hill, British distance runner (d. 1969)
  - Jeanne Guiot, French engineer specialising in metallurgy (d. 11 July 1963)
- March 29 – Warner Baxter, American actor (d. 1951)
- March 30 – Herman Bing, German-American character, voice actor (d. 1947)

=== April ===
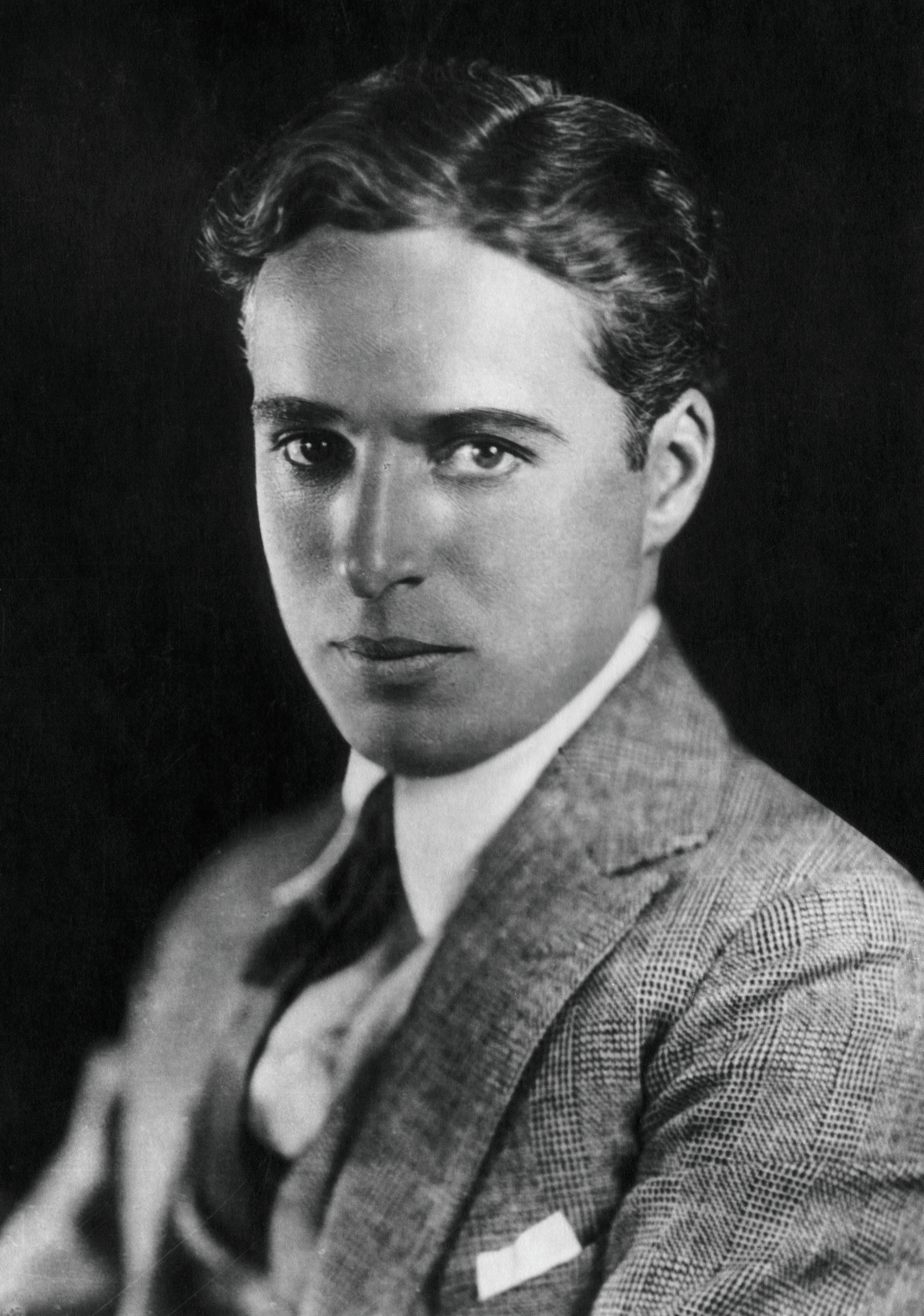
Charlie Chaplin

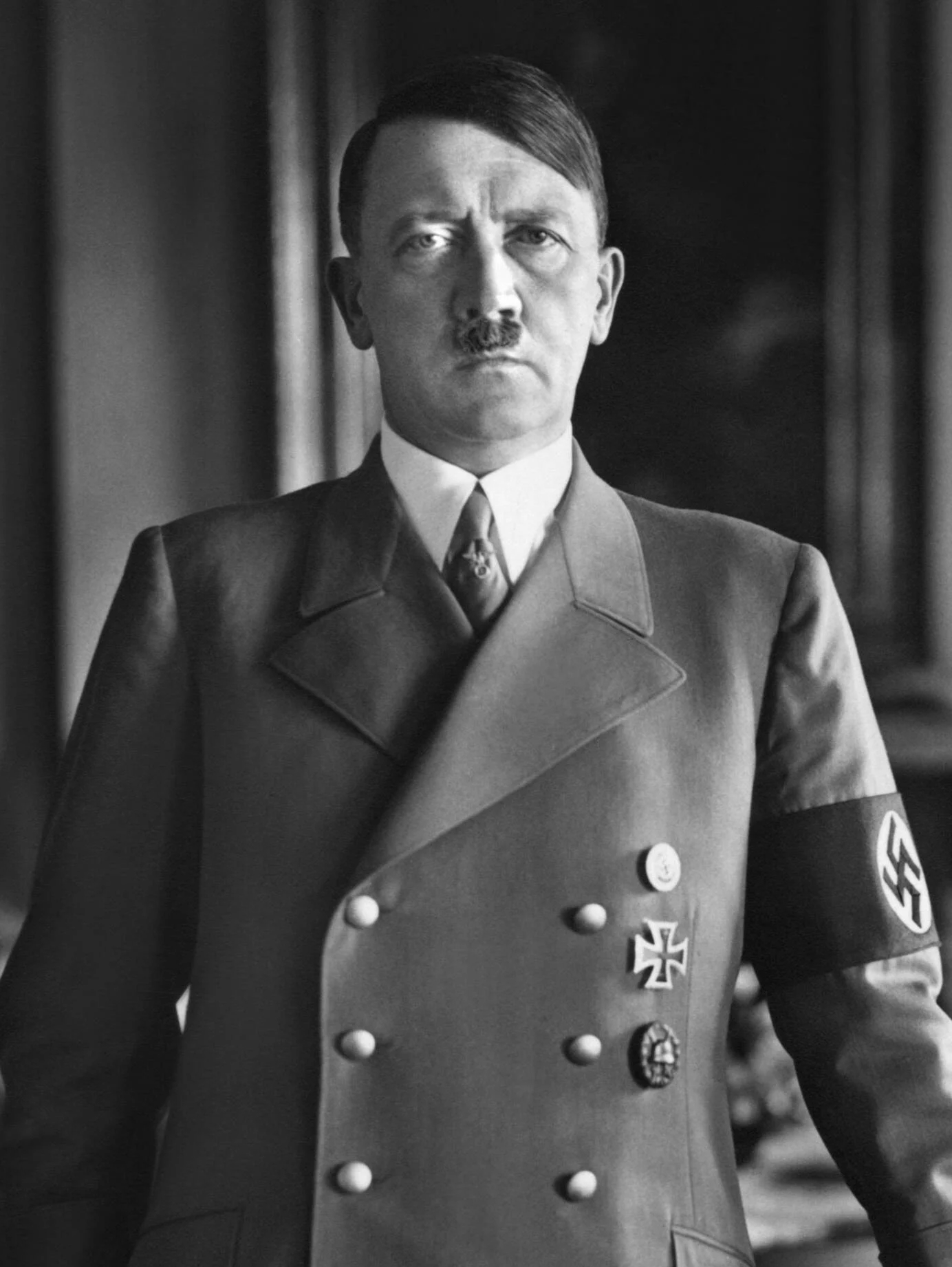
Adolf Hitler

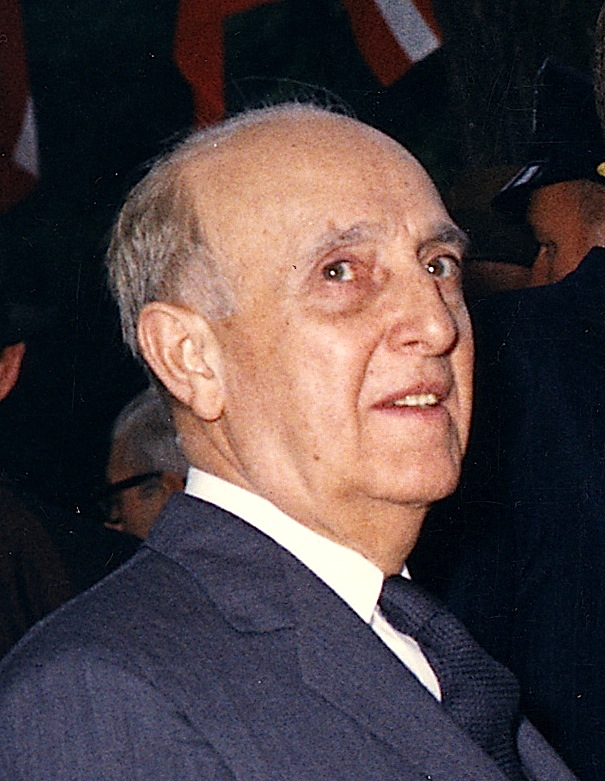
Manuel Prado Ugarteche

- April 4
  - Hans-Jürgen von Arnim, German general (d. 1962)
  - Angelo Iachino, Italian admiral (d. 1976)
- April 7 – Gabriela Mistral, Chilean writer, Nobel Prize laureate (d. 1957)
- April 8 – Adrian Boult, English conductor (d. 1983)
- April 11 – Nick LaRocca, American jazz cornetist (d. 1961)
- April 14 – Arnold J. Toynbee, English historian (d. 1975)
- April 15
  - Thomas Hart Benton, American painter (d. 1975)
  - A. Philip Randolph, African-American civil rights activist (d. 1979)
- April 16 – Charlie Chaplin, English comic actor, film director (d. 1977)
- April 20
  - Prince Erik, Duke of Västmanland, Swedish and Norwegian prince (d. 1918)
  - Adolf Hitler, Austrian-born dictator of Nazi Germany (suicide 1945)
- April 21
  - Paul Karrer, Swiss chemist, Nobel Prize laureate (d. 1971)
  - Manuel Prado Ugarteche, President of Peru (d. 1967)
- April 23 – Karel Doorman, Dutch admiral (killed in action 1942)
- April 26 – Ludwig Wittgenstein, Austrian-born philosopher (d. 1951)
- April 28
  - Takeo Kurita, Japanese admiral (d. 1977)
  - António de Oliveira Salazar, Portuguese dictator (d. 1970)
- April 30 – Fritz Pfeffer, German-Dutch housemate of Anne Frank (d. 1944)

=== May ===
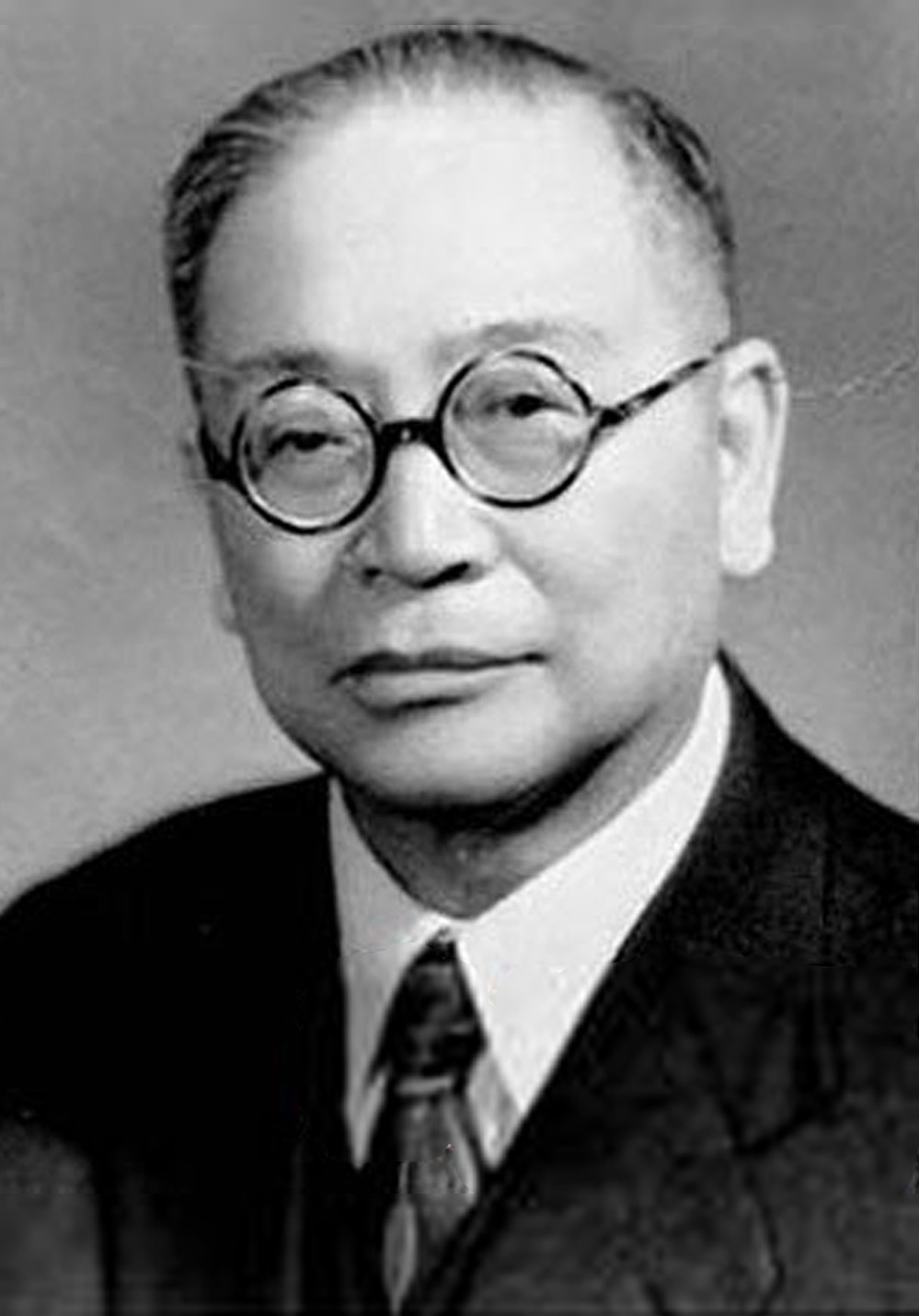
Ouyang Yuqian

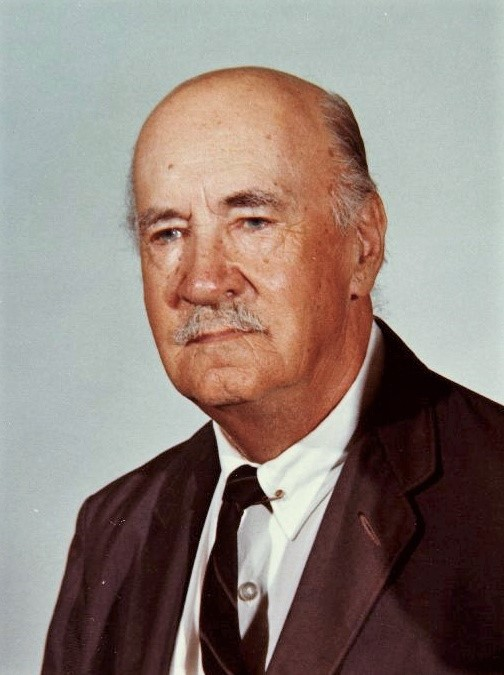
Igor Sikorsky

- May 3
  - Beulah Bondi, American actress (d. 1981)
  - Gottfried Fuchs, German-Canadian Olympic soccer player (d. 1972)
- May 12
  - Otto Frank, German publisher, businessman, father of Anne Frank (d. 1980)
  - Abelardo L. Rodríguez, Mexican professional baseball player, general and substitute President of Mexico, 1932–1934 (d. 1967)
  - Ouyang Yuqian, Chinese playwright, director and Peking opera performer (d. 1962)
- May 18 – Thomas Midgley Jr., American chemist, inventor (d. 1944)
- May 23 – Carlo Braga, Filipino Roman Catholic priest, archbishop and servant of God (d. 1971)
- May 25
  - Günther Lütjens, German admiral (d. 1941)
  - Igor Sikorsky, Russian developer of the helicopter (d. 1972)

=== June ===
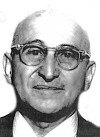
Beno Gutenberg

- June 2 – Martha Wentworth, American actress (d. 1974)
- June 4 – Beno Gutenberg, German-American seismologist (d. 1960)
- June 10 – Sessue Hayakawa, Japanese actor, film director (d. 1973)
- June 13
  - Amadeo Bordiga, Italian Marxist theorist, politician (d. 1970)
  - Gao Qifeng, Chinese painter (d. 1933)
  - Adolphe Pégoud, French acrobatic pilot, World War I fighter ace (killed in action 1915)
- June 21 – Ralph Craig, American sprinter (d. 1972)
- June 23 – Anna Akhmatova, Russian poet (d. 1966)
- June 25 – John Morton-Finney, American civil rights activist, lawyer and educator (d. 1998)
- June 27 – Moroni Olsen, American actor (d. 1954)

=== July ===
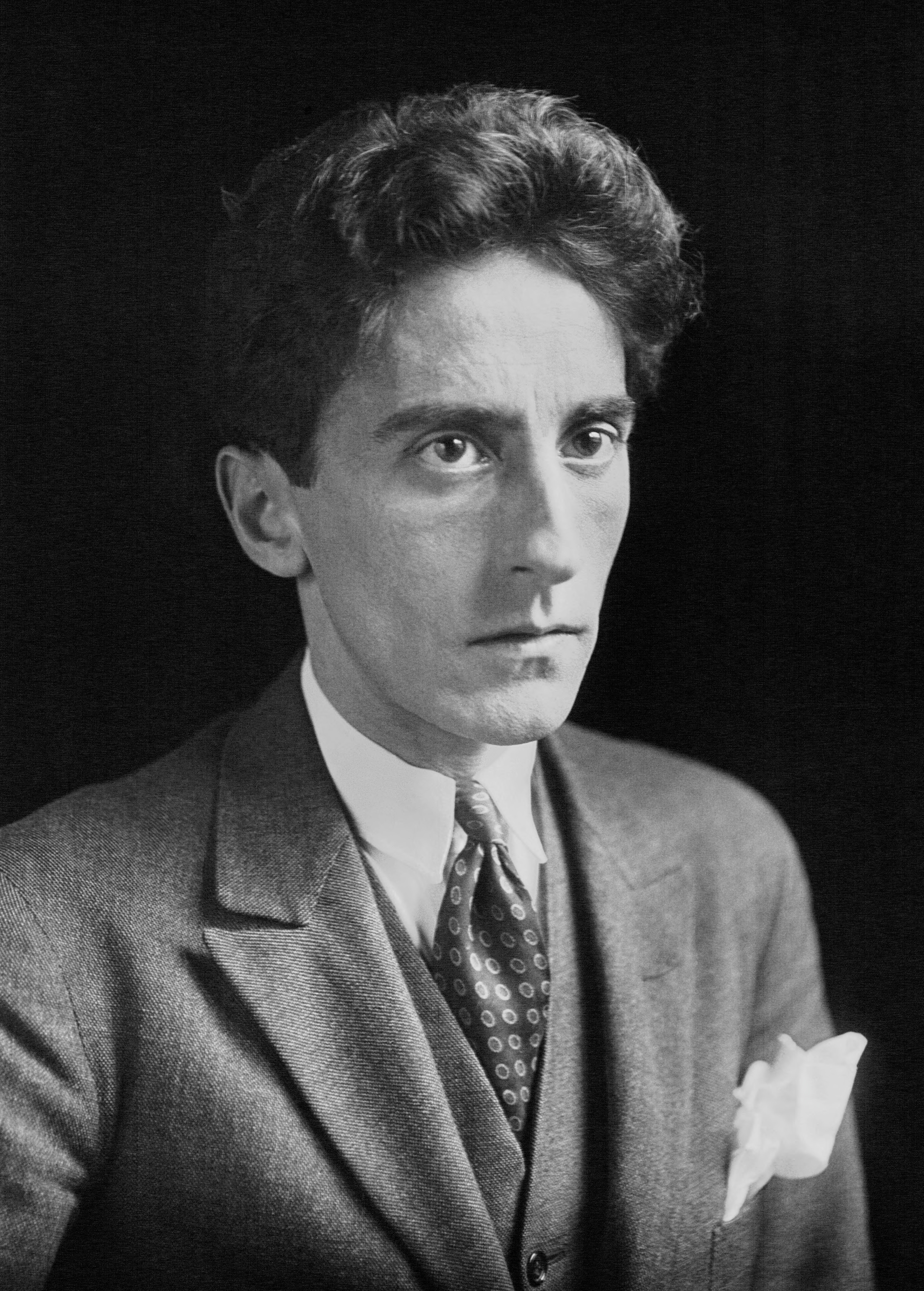
Jean Cocteau

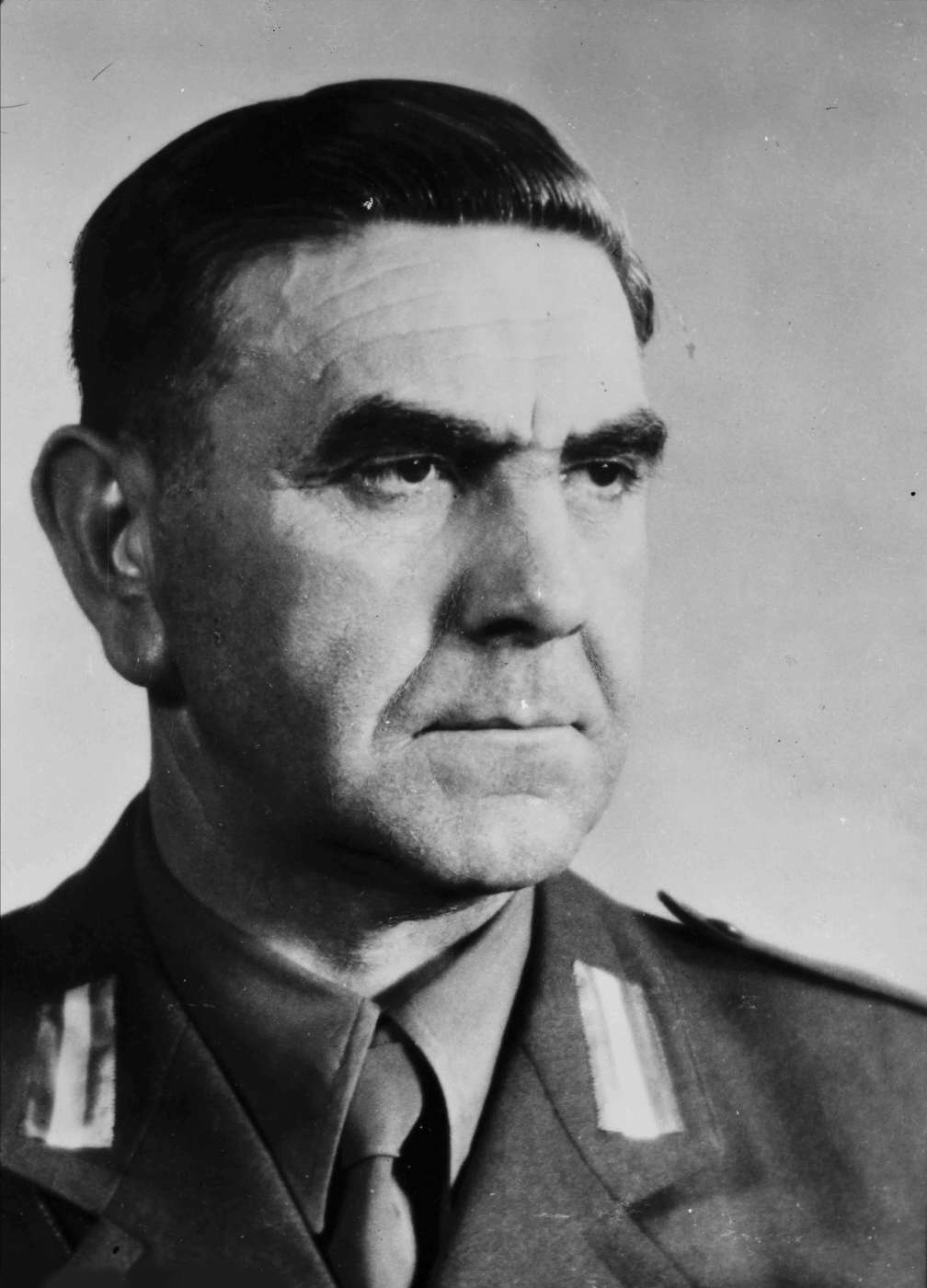
Ante Pavelić

- July 5 – Jean Cocteau, French writer (d. 1963)
- July 6 – Takeo Itō, Japanese general (d. 1965)
- July 7 – Shiro Kawase, Japanese admiral (d. 1946)
- July 8 – Eugene Pallette, American actor (d. 1954)
- July 14 – Ante Pavelić, Croatian fascist dictator (d. 1959)
- July 15 – Marjorie Rambeau, American actress (d. 1970)
- July 17 – Erle Stanley Gardner, American author (d. 1970)
- July 18 – Kōichi Kido, Japanese politician (d. 1977)
- July 22 – Tony Jannus, American aviator, aircraft designer (d. 1916)
- July 24 – Murray Kinnell, English actor (d. 1954)

=== August ===
- August 5 – Conrad Aiken, American writer (d. 1973)
- August 6 – George Kenney, World War II United States Army Air Forces general (d. 1977)
- August 10 – Norman Scott, American admiral, Medal of Honor recipient (killed in action 1942)
- August 11 – Ronald Fairbairn, Scottish psychiatrist and psychoanalyst (d. 1964)
- August 15 – Marthe Richard, French prostitute, spy and politician (d. 1982)
- August 21 – Sir Richard O'Connor, British general (d. 1981)
- August 25 – Ioan Dumitrache, Romanian general (d. 1977)
- August 29 – Alfredo Obviar, Filipino Roman Catholic bishop and Servant of God (d. 1978)

=== September ===
- September 7 – Albert Plesman, Dutch aviation pioneer (d. 1953)
- September 8 – Robert A. Taft, U.S. Senator from Ohio (d. 1953)
- September 12 – Ugo Pasquale Mifsud, 3rd Prime Minister of Malta (d. 1942)
- September 13 – Masao Maruyama, Japanese general (d. 1957)
- September 14 – María Capovilla, Ecuadorian supercentenarian, the last surviving person verified as born in 1889 (d. 2006)
- September 20 – Charles Reidpath, American sprinter (d. 1975)
- September 22 - Alice Golsen, German quantum physicist (d. 1940)
- September 26
  - Martin Heidegger, German philosopher (d. 1976)
  - Abdulkadir Inan, Bashkir/Turkish historian and Turkologist (d. 1976)

=== October ===
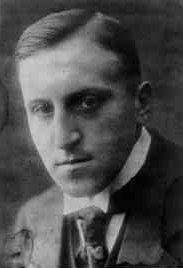
Carl von Ossietzky

- October 2 – Margaret Chung, Chinese-American physician (d. 1959)
- October 3 – Carl von Ossietzky, German pacifist, recipient of the Nobel Peace Prize (d. 1938)
- October 8 – Collett E. Woolman, American airline executive (d. 1966)
- October 10
  - Kermit Roosevelt, American explorer, author (d. 1943)
  - Han van Meegeren, Dutch painter, art forger (d. 1947)
- October 12 – Troy H. Middleton, American general and educator (d. 1976)
- October 13
  - Douglass Dumbrille, Canadian-born actor (d. 1974)
  - Cedric Holland, British admiral (d. 1950)
- October 20
  - Suzanne Duchamp, French painter (d. 1963)
  - Marie-Louise Paris, French engineer who founded l'Institut électro-mécanique féminin in 1925 (d. 1969)

=== November ===
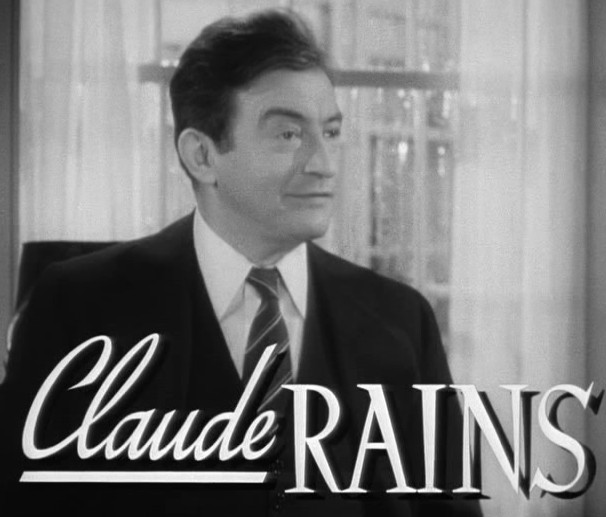
Claude Rains

- November 1 – Philip Noel-Baker, Baron Noel-Baker, Canadian-born peace activist, recipient of the Nobel Peace Prize (d. 1982)
- November 10 – Claude Rains, English-born American actor (d. 1967)
- November 12 – DeWitt Wallace, American magazine publisher (Reader's Digest) (d. 1981)
- November 14
  - Taha Hussein, Egyptian writer and intellectual (d. 1973)
  - Jawaharlal Nehru, 1st Prime Minister of India (d. 1964)
- November 15 – King Manuel II of Portugal (d. 1932)
- November 16 – George S. Kaufman, American playwright (d. 1961)
- November 18 – Zoltán Tildy, President of Hungary (d. 1961)
- November 19 – Clifton Webb, American actor, dancer and singer (d. 1966)
- November 20 – Edwin Hubble, American astronomer (d. 1953)
- November 23 – Alexander Patch, American general (d. 1945)
- November 25 – George McMillin, American admiral, last Naval Governor of Guam (d. 1983)
- November 30
  - Edgar Adrian, English physiologist, Nobel Prize laureate (d. 1977)
  - Shōji Nishimura, Japanese admiral (killed in action 1944)

=== December ===
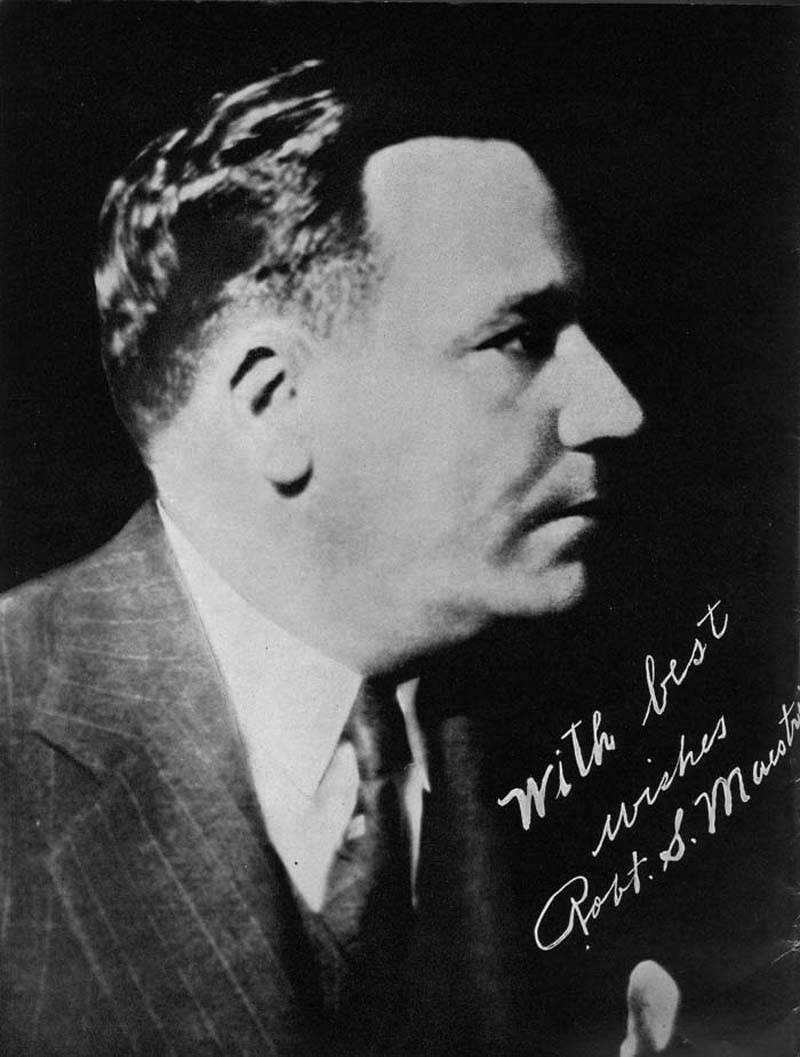
Robert Maestri

- December 1 – Vasily Blyukher, Soviet general, Marshal of the Soviet Union (k. 1938)
- December 2 – Oei Hui-lan (Madame Wellington Koo), Chinese-Indonesian socialite and First Lady of the Republic of China (d. 1992)
- December 3 – Walton Walker, American general (d. 1950)
- December 4 – Isabel Randolph, American actress (d. 1973)
- December 9
  - Shigeyoshi Inoue, Japanese admiral (d. 1975)
  - Hannes Kolehmainen, Finnish Olympic distance runner (d. 1966)
- December 11 – Robert Maestri, 53rd Mayor of New Orleans (d. 1974)
- December 23 – Daniel E. Barbey, American admiral (d. 1969)
- December 30 – Adolfo Ruiz Cortines, 47th President of Mexico (d. 1973)

=== Date unknown ===
- Nezihe Muhiddin, Turkish women's rights activist, suffragette, journalist, writer and political leader (d. 1958)

== Deaths ==
1880

=== January–June ===
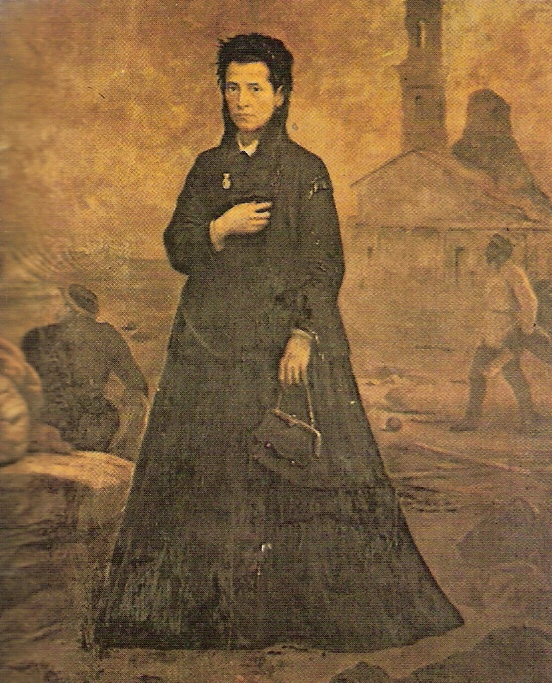
Ana Neri

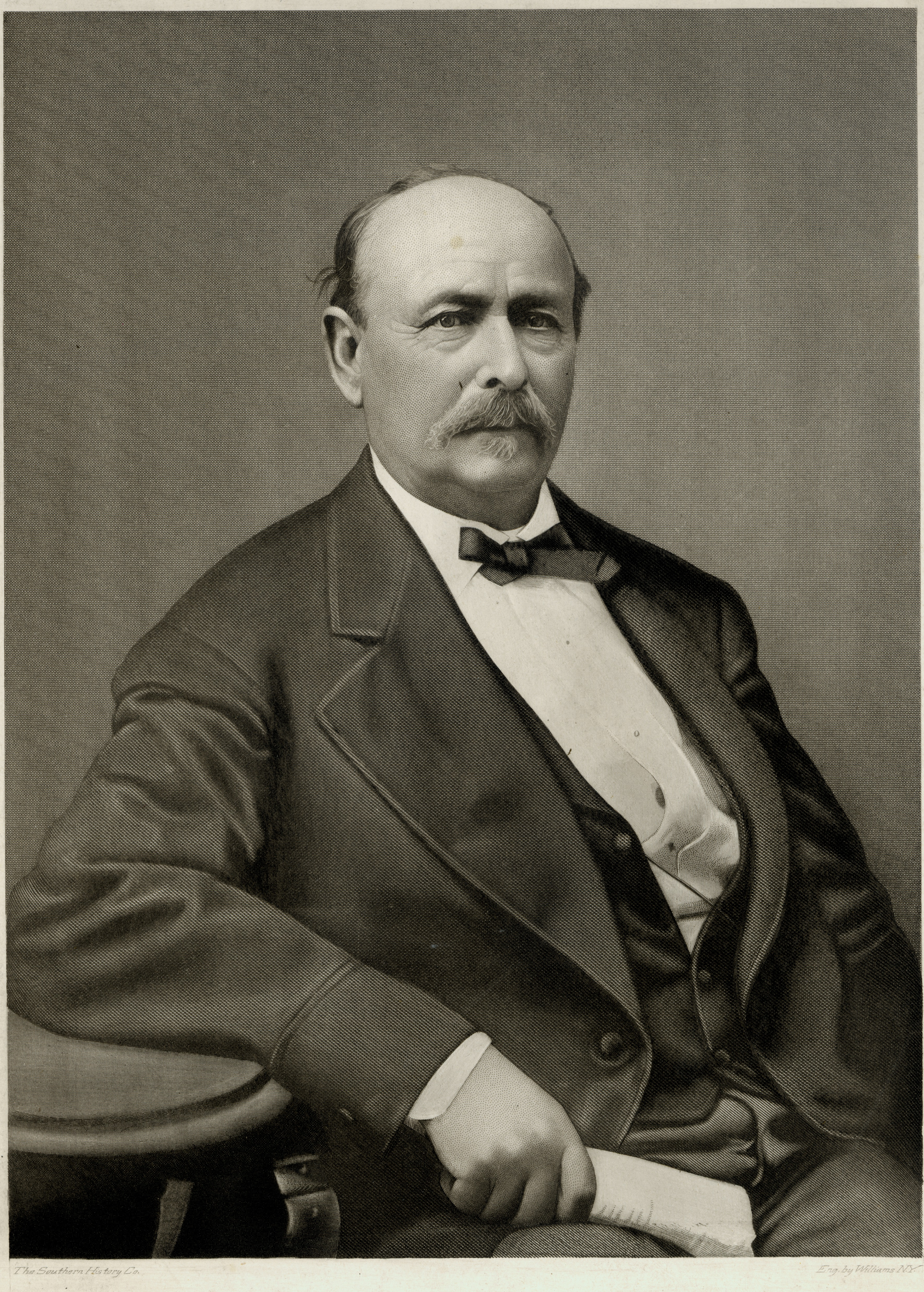
Eberhard Anheuser

- January 4
  - Anselm Feuerbach, German painter (b. 1829)
  - Marthe Camille Bachasson, Count of Montalivet, French statesman (b. 1801)
- January 8 – Joshua A. Norton, self-anointed Emperor Norton I of the United States of America (b. 1811)
- January 12 – Ellen Lewis Herndon Arthur, wife of Chester A. Arthur (b. 1837)
- January 14 – Frederick VIII of Schleswig-Holstein (b. 1829)
- January 20 – Captain Moonlite, Australian bushranger (hanged) (b. 1842)
- January 31 – Adolphe Granier de Cassagnac, French politician (b. 1806)
- February 18 – Nikolay Zinin, Russian organic chemist (b. 1812)
- February 29 – Sir James Milne Wilson, Premier of Tasmania (b. 1812)
- March 14 – Pagan Min, King of Ava (b. 1811)
- March 31 – Henryk Wieniawski, Polish composer (b. 1835)
- April 23 – Raden Saleh, Indonesian painter (b. 1807)
- April 27 – Joseph Vinoy, French general (b. 1803)
- May 2
- Eberhard Anheuser, German-American brewer, co-founder of Anheuser-Busch (b. 1806)
  - Eunice Hale Waite Cobb, American public speaker (b. 1803)
  - Tom Wills, Australian cricketer, pioneer of Australian rules football (b. 1835)
- May 4 – Edward Clark, Confederate Governor of Texas (b. 1815)
- May 8 – Gustave Flaubert, French novelist (b. 1821)
- May 20 – Ana Néri, Brazilian nurse (b. 1814)
- May 22 – Heinrich von Gagern, German statesman and politician (b. 1799)
- June 8 – Maria Alexandrovna (Marie of Hesse), Empress Consort of Czar Alexander II of Russia (b. 1824)
- June 28 – Texas Jack Omohundro, American frontier scout, actor, and cowboy (b. 1846)

=== July–December ===
Jacques Offenbach

- July 9 – Paul Broca, French physician and anthropologist (b. 1824)
- July 17 – Tomasz Chołodecki, Polish political activist (b. 1813)
- July 21 – Hiram Walden, American politician (b. 1800)
- August 9 – William Bigler, American politician (b. 1814)
- August 15 – Adelaide Neilson, English actress (b. 1848)
- August 16 – Herschel Vespasian Johnson, American politician (b. 1812)
- August 17 – Ole Bull, Norwegian violinist (b. 1810)
- August 24 – Chief Ouray, Native American leader (b. c. 1833)
- September 21 – Manuel Montt, 5th President of Chile (b. 1809)
- September 25 – John Tarleton, British admiral (b. 1811)
- October 5 – Jacques Offenbach, German-born French composer (b. 1819)
- October 14 – Victorio, Chiricahua Apache chief (b. c. 1825)
- October 22 – Alphonse Pénaud, French aviation pioneer (b. 1850)
- October 23 – Bettino Ricasoli, Italian statesman (b. 1809)
- November 11
  - Ned Kelly, Australian bush ranger (hanged) (b. c. 1855)
  - Lucretia Mott, American social activist (b. 1793)
- November 13 – August Karl von Goeben, Prussian general (b. 1816)
- November 23 – Sir Redmond Barry, Australian judge, sentenced Ned Kelly to death (b. 1813)
- November 28 – Aires de Ornelas e Vasconcelos, (Portuguese) Archbishop of Goa (b. 1837)
- November 30 – Jeanette Threlfall, English hymnwriter (b. 1821)
- December 7 – Maria Giuseppa Rossello, Italian Roman Catholic religious sister and blessed (b. 1811)
- December 20 – Gaspar Tochman, Polish-American soldier (b. 1797)
- December 22 – George Eliot, English writer (b. 1819)

=== Date unknown ===
- Manolache Costache Epureanu, 2-time prime minister of Romania (b. 1823)
- Ng Akew, Chinese businesswoman

1881

=== January–June ===
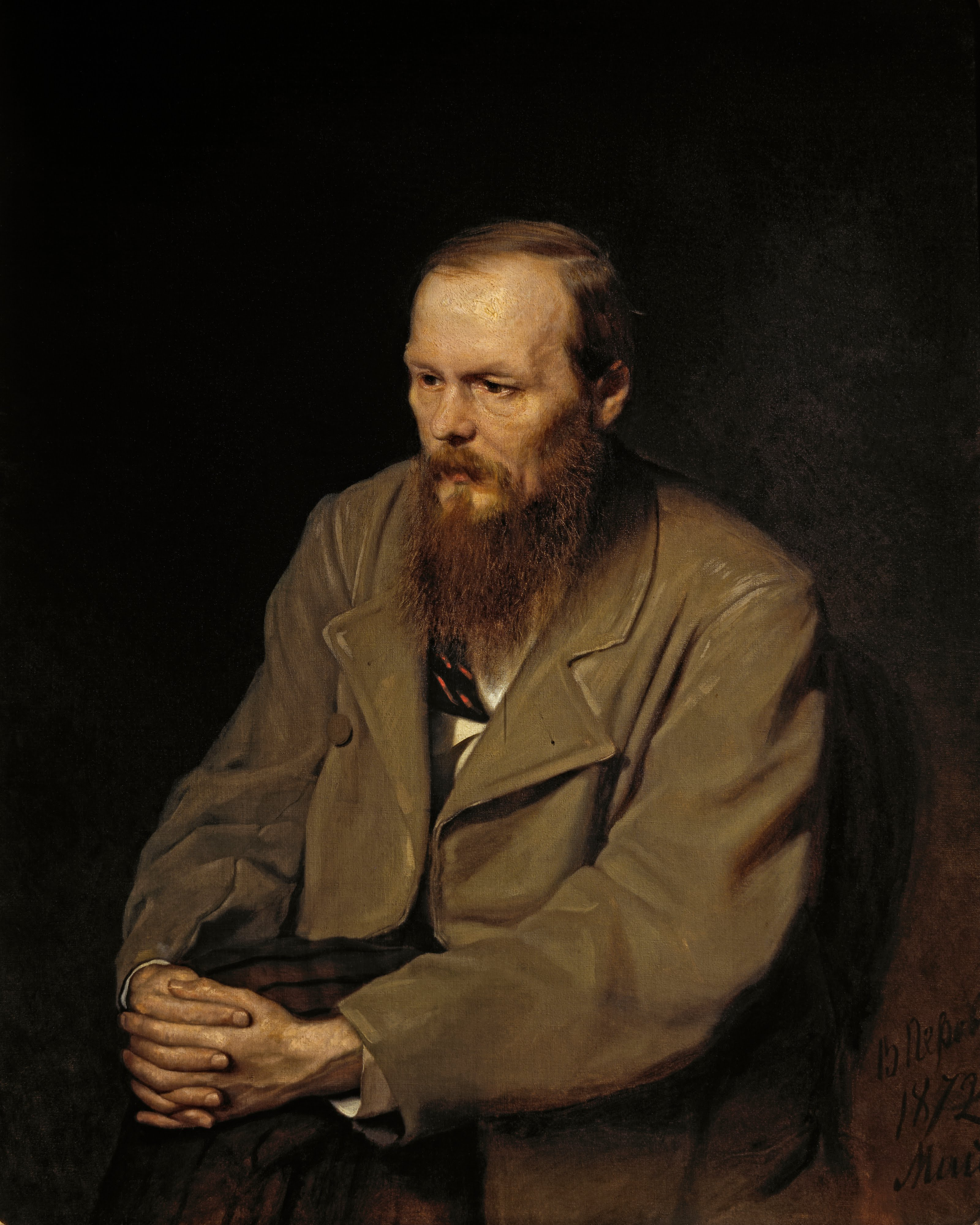
Fyodor Dostoyevsky

Anna McNeill Whistler

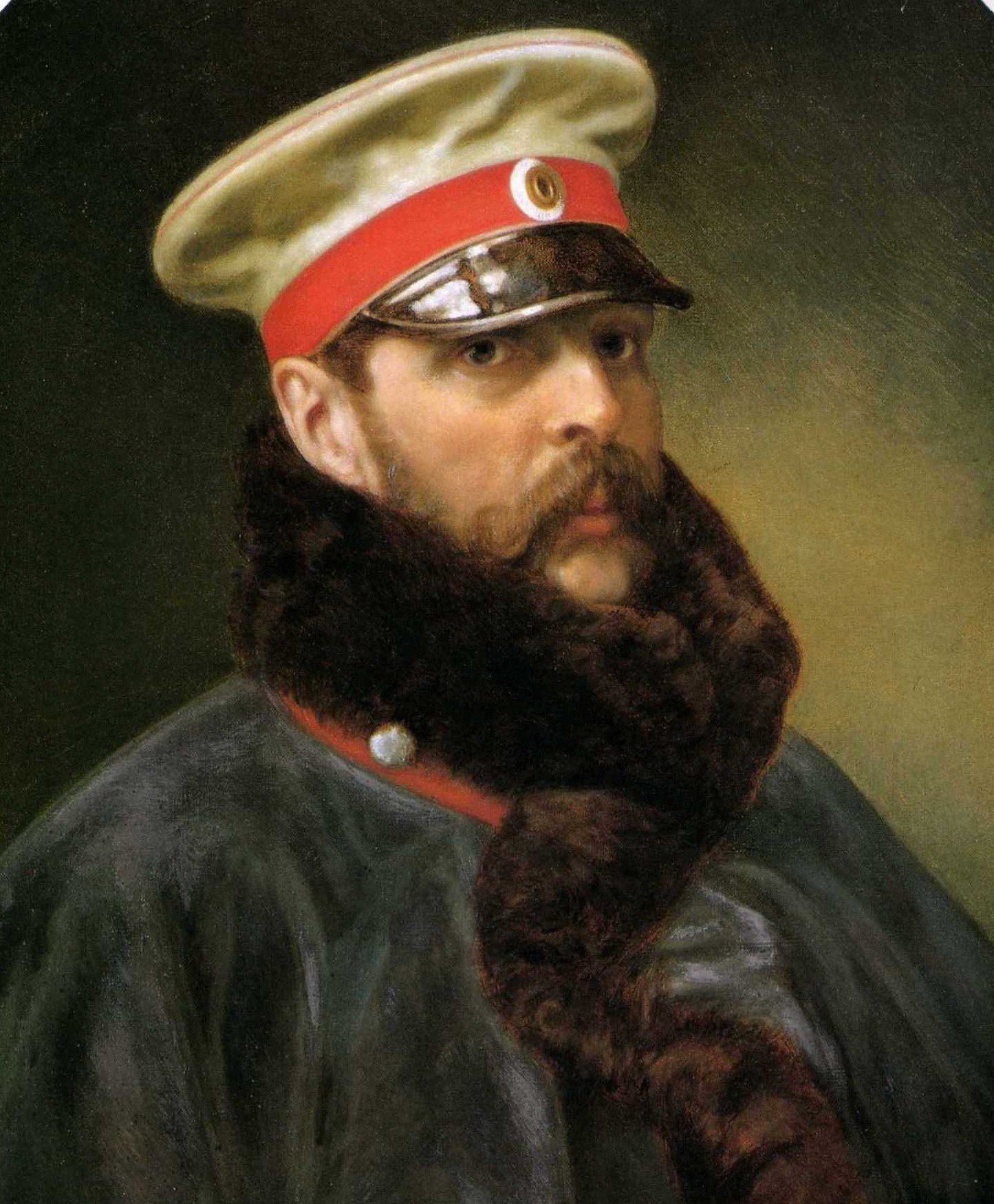
Alexander II of Russia

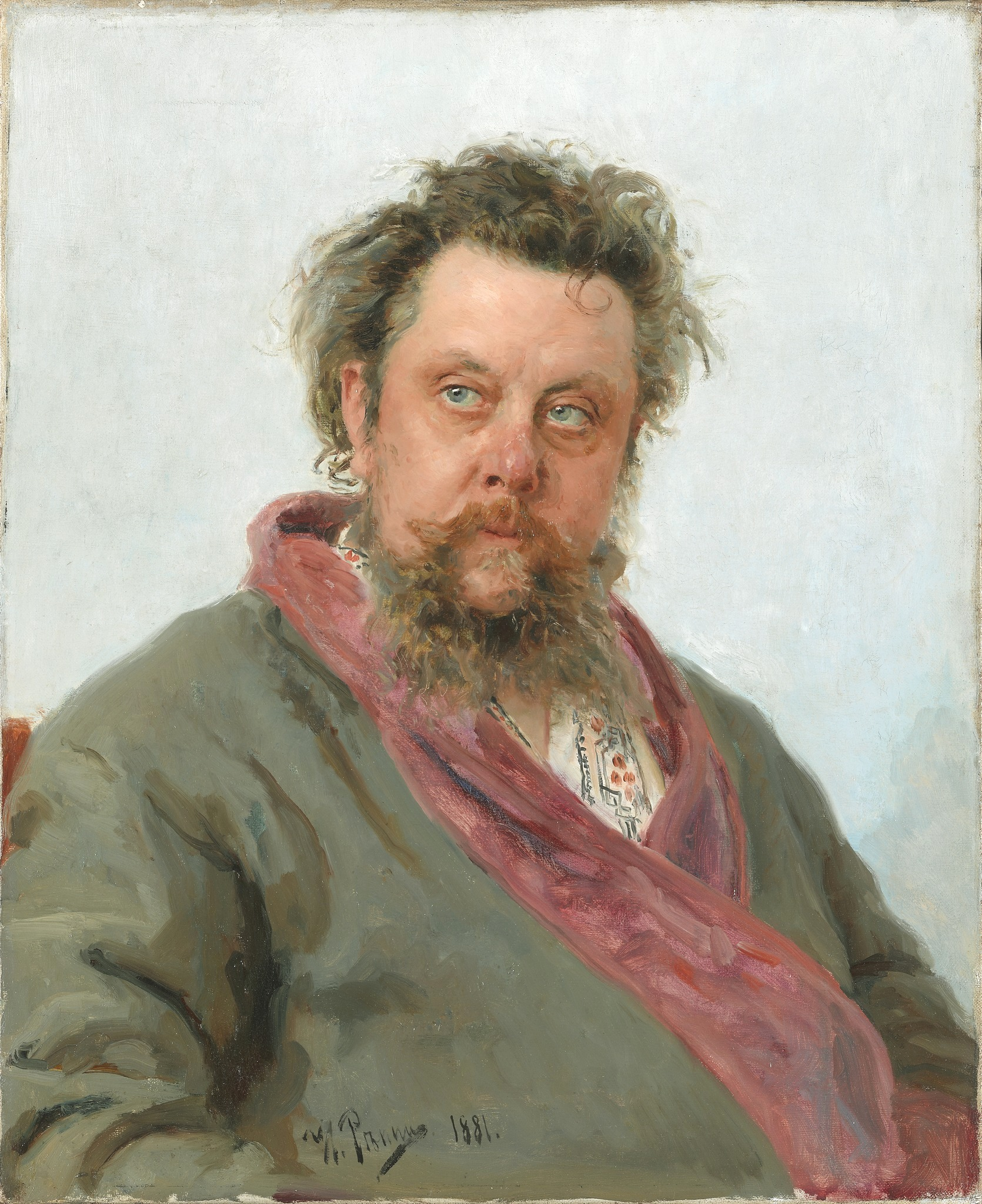
Modest Mussorgsky

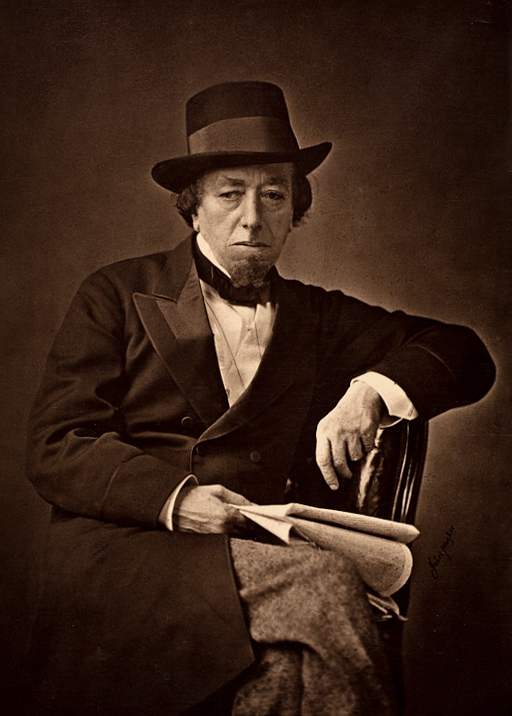
Benjamin Disraeli

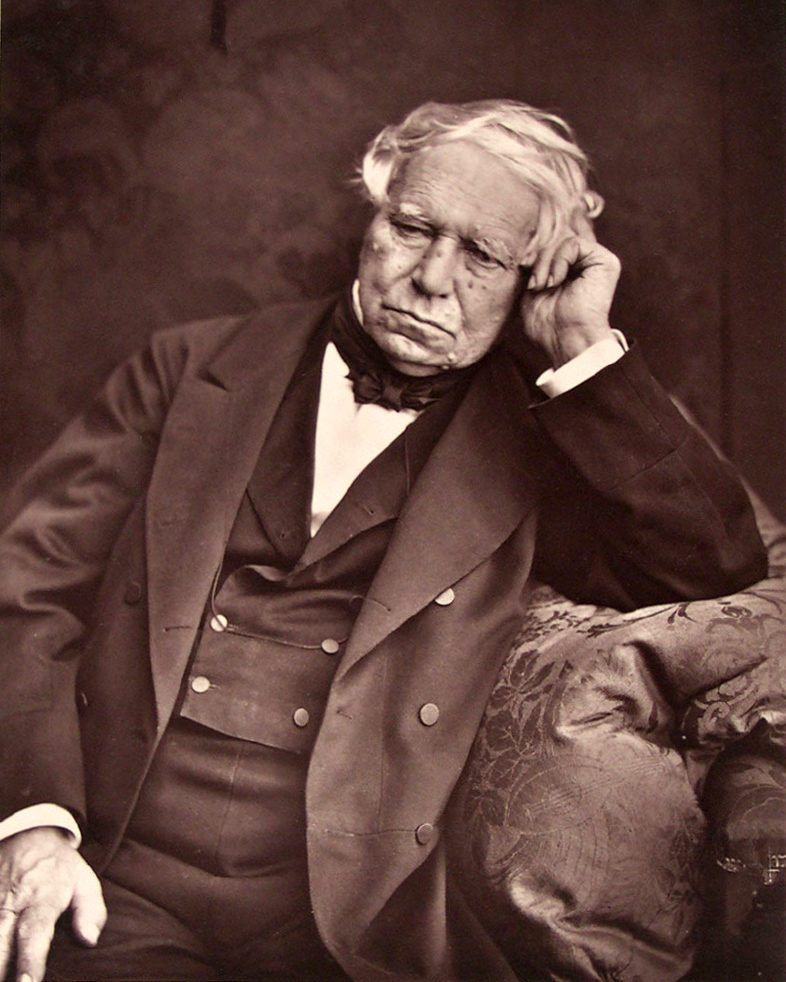
Jules Armand Dufaure

- January 1 – Louis Auguste Blanqui, French socialist, political activist (b. 1805)
- January 3 – Anna McNeill Whistler, James Whistler's mother, subject of his painting (b. 1804)
- January 18 – Auguste Mariette, French Egyptologist (b. 1821)
- January 21 – Wilhelm Matthias Naeff, member of the Swiss Federal Council (b. 1802)
- January 24 – Frances Stackhouse Acton, British botanist, archaeologist, writer and artist (b. 1794)
- February 5 – Thomas Carlyle, Scottish writer, historian (b. 1795)
- February 6 – Pieter Mijer, Governor-General of the Dutch East Indies (b. 1812)
- February 8 – Marie Jules Dupré, French admiral and colonial governor (b. 1813)
- February 9 – Fyodor Dostoyevsky, Russian novelist (b. 1821)
- February 14 – Fernando Wood, New York City mayor (b. 1812)
- February 23 – Robert F. R. Lewis, American naval officer (b. 1826)
- March 2 – Sir John Cracroft Wilson, British civil servant, and politician in New Zealand (b. 1808)
- March 13 – Emperor Alexander II of Russia (assassinated) (b. 1818)
- March 28 – Modest Mussorgsky, Russian composer (b. 1839)
- March 31 – Lucy Virginia French, American blank verse poet (b. 1825)
- April 19 – Benjamin Disraeli, Prime Minister of the United Kingdom (b. 1804)
- April 26 – Ludwig Freiherr von und zu der Tann-Rathsamhausen, Bavarian general (b. 1815)
- April 27 – Ludwig von Benedek, Austrian general (b. 1804)
- May 14 – Mary Seacole, British nurse (b. 1805)
- May 24 – Samuel Palmer, English artist (b. 1805)
- May 25 – Giuseppe Maria Giulietti, Italian explorer (b. 1847)
- June 6 – Henri Vieuxtemps, Belgian composer (b. 1820)
- June 28 – Jules Armand Dufaure, 3-time prime minister of France (b. 1798)
- June 30 – Gustav von Alvensleben, Prussian general (b. 1803)

=== July – December ===
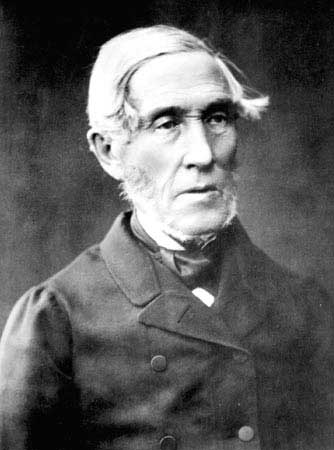
J. V. Snellman

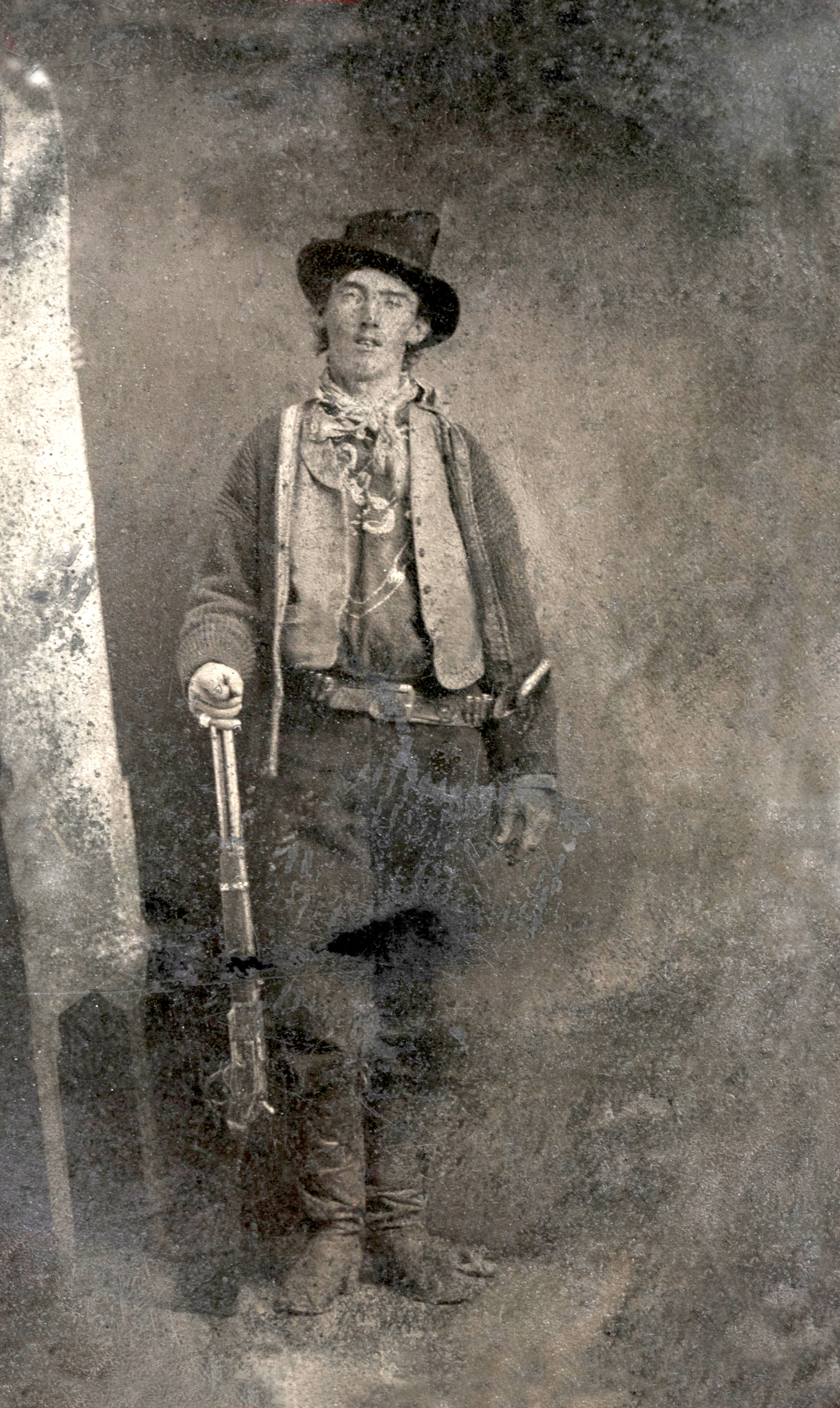
Billy the Kid

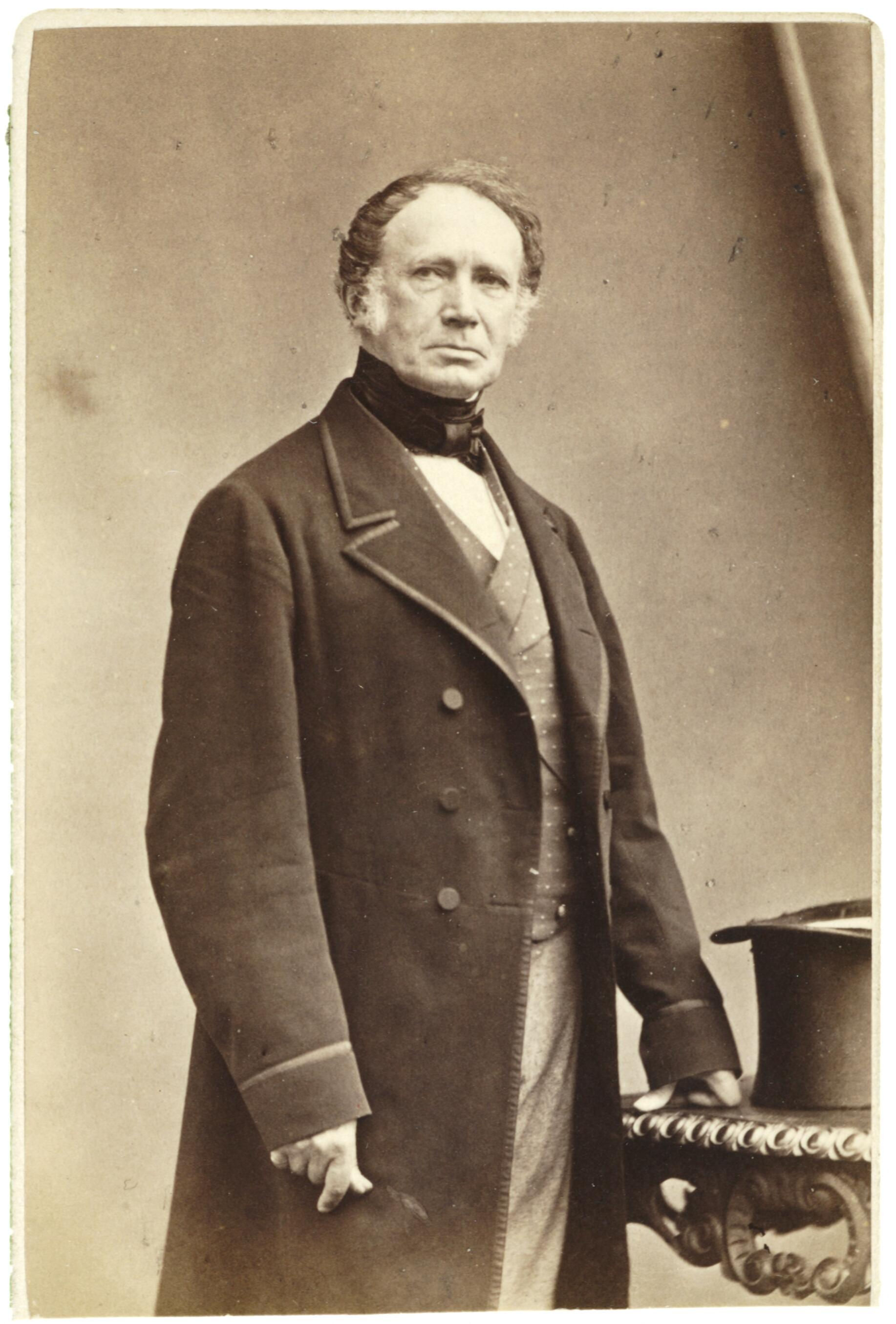
Prince Frederick of the Netherlands

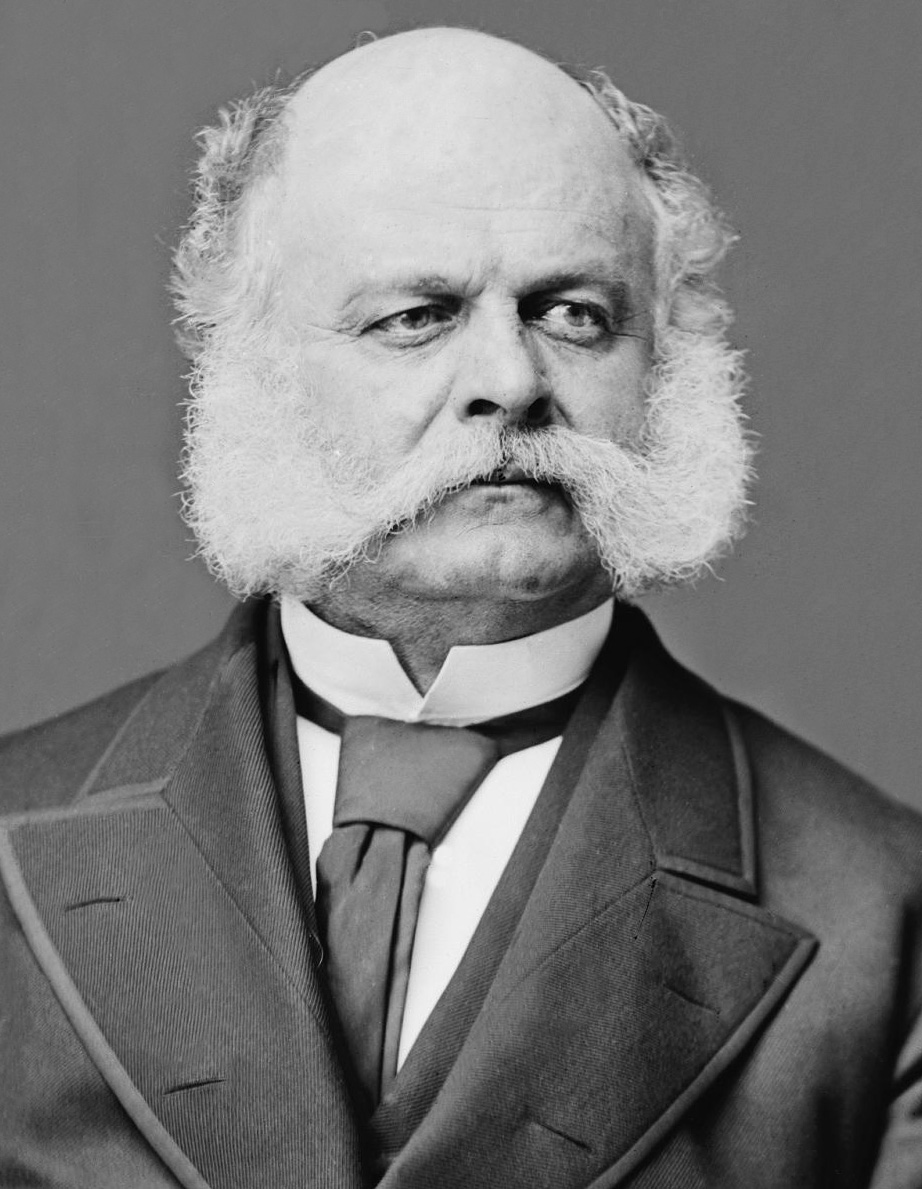
Ambrose Burnside

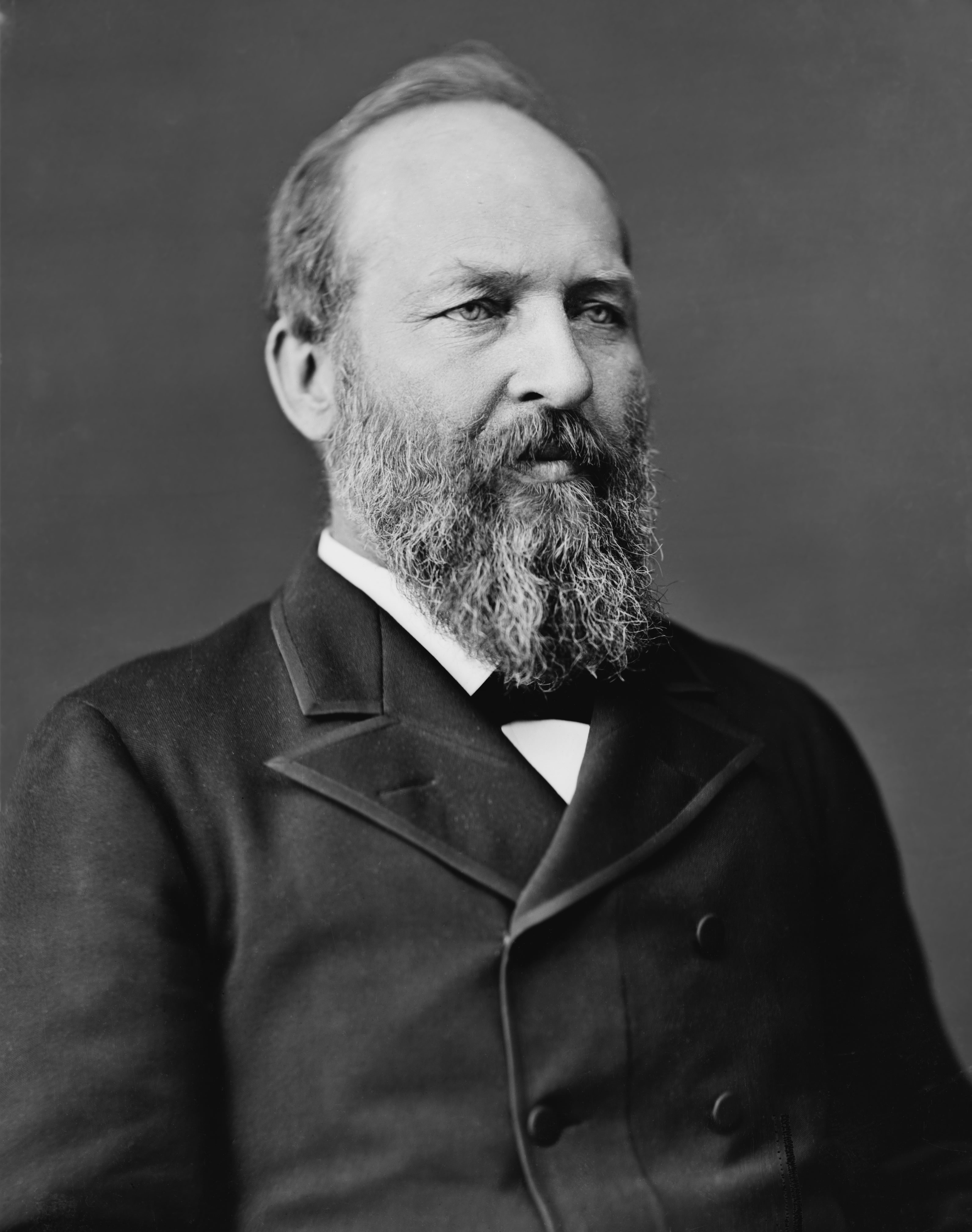
James A. Garfield

- July 1
  - Baron Jules Dupotet de Sennevoy, French writer (b. 1796)
  - Hermann Lotze, German philosopher and logician (b. 1817)
- July 4 – J. V. Snellman, Finnish statesman and an influential Fennoman philosopher (b. 1806)
- July 14 – Billy the Kid, American gunslinger (b. 1859)
- July 17 – Jim Bridger, American explorer and trapper (b. 1804)
- August 3 – William Fargo, American expressman and politician, Mayor of Buffalo, New York (b. 1818)
- August 11 – Jane Digby, English adventurer (b. 1807)
- August 15 – Alexandru G. Golescu, 11th prime minister of Romania (b. 1819)
- September 7 – Sidney Lanier, American writer (b. 1842)
- September 8 – Prince Frederick of the Netherlands, Dutch noble, general (b. 1797)
- September 13 – Ambrose Burnside, American Civil War general, inventor, politician from Rhode Island (b. 1824)
- September 19 – James A. Garfield, 20th President of the United States (b. 1831)
- September 22 – Solomon L. Spink, U.S. Congressman from Illinois (b. 1831)
- October 3
  - Orson Pratt, American religious leader (b. 1811)
  - Princess Sumiko, Japanese princess (b. 1829)
- October 31 – George W. De Long, American naval officer, explorer (starvation) (b. 1844)
- December 4 – Hugh Judson Kilpatrick, American general, politician, and diplomat (b. 1836)
- December 18 – George Edmund Street, British architect (b. 1824)

1882

=== January–June ===
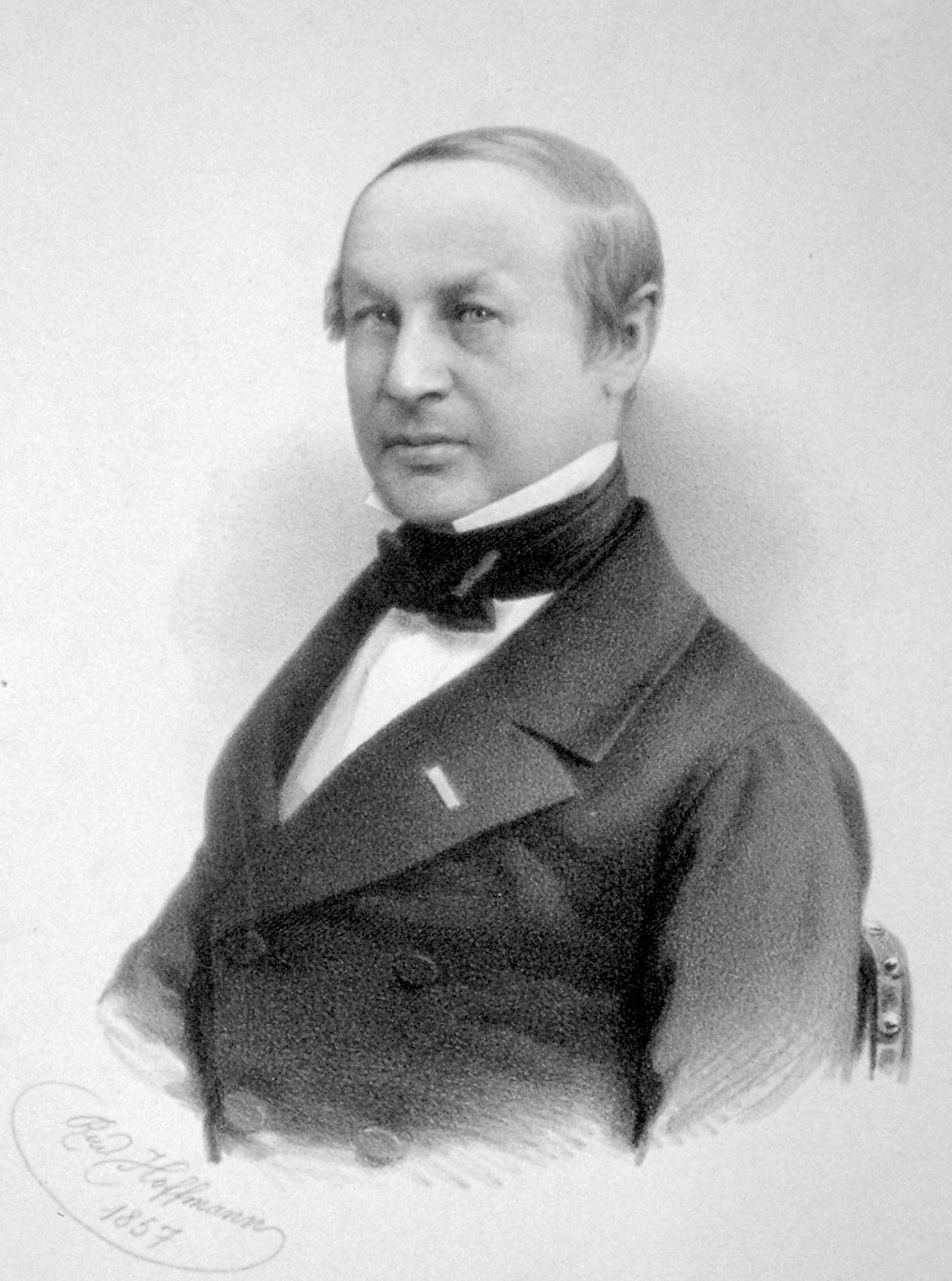
Theodor Schwann

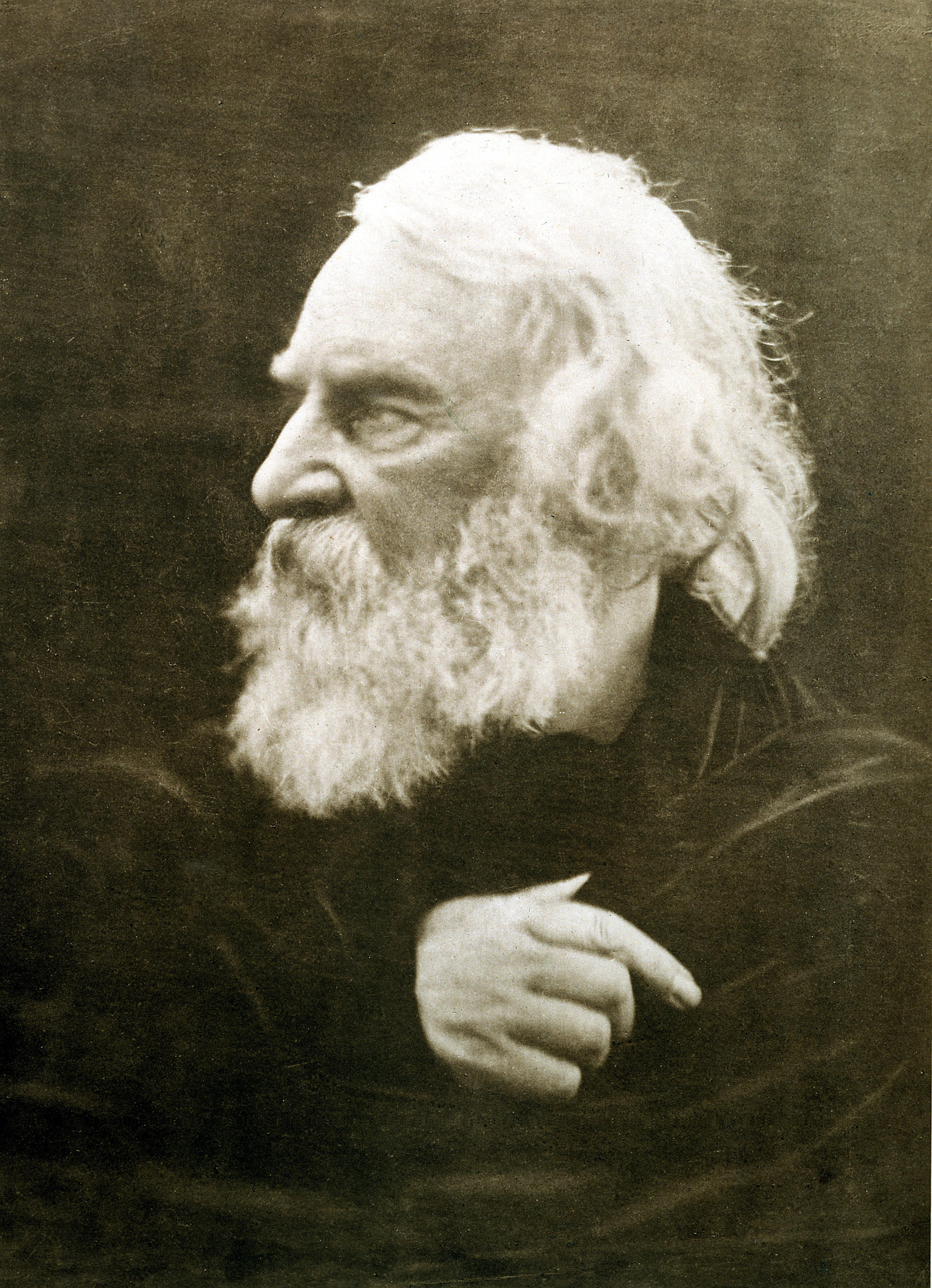
Henry Wadsworth Longfellow

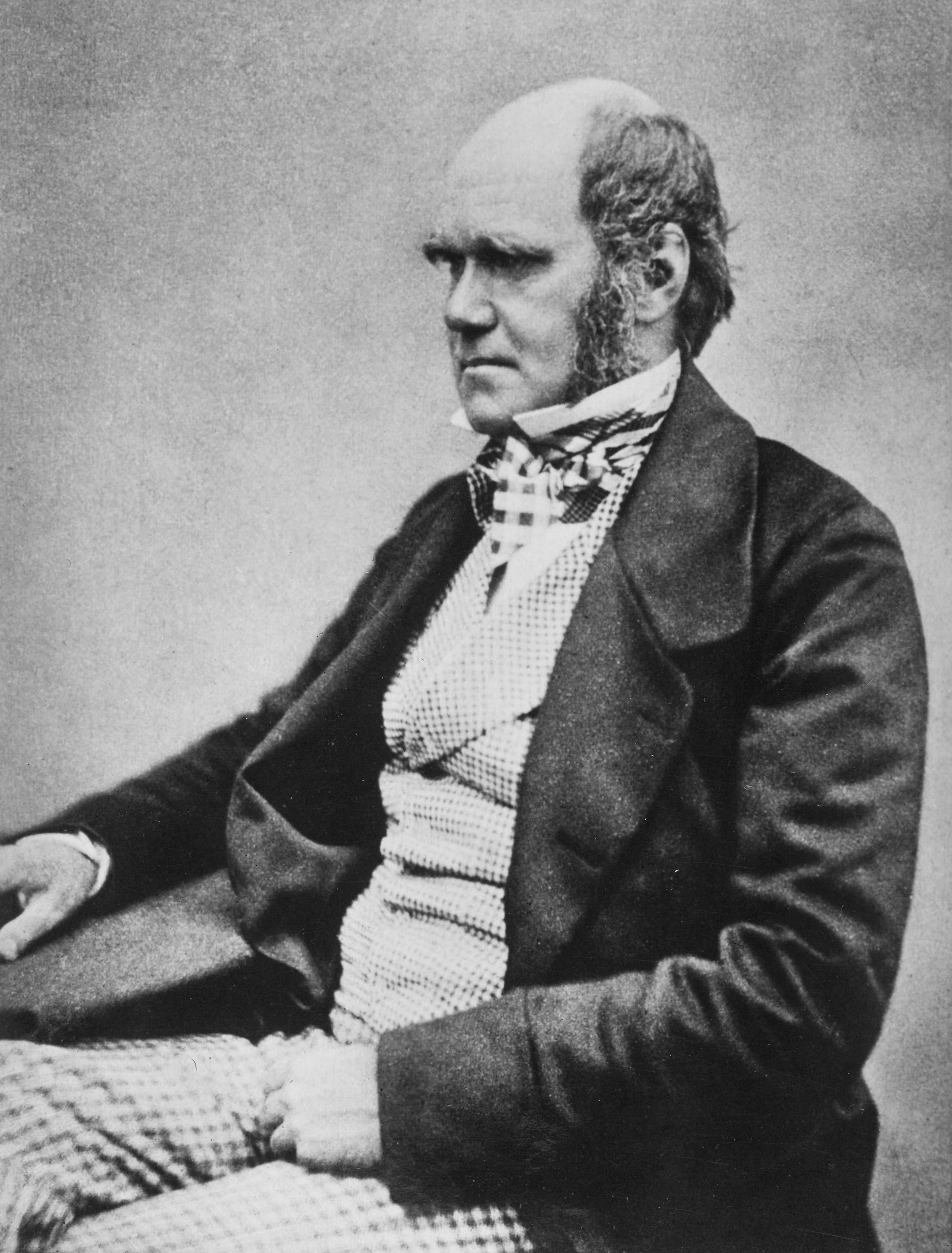
Charles Darwin

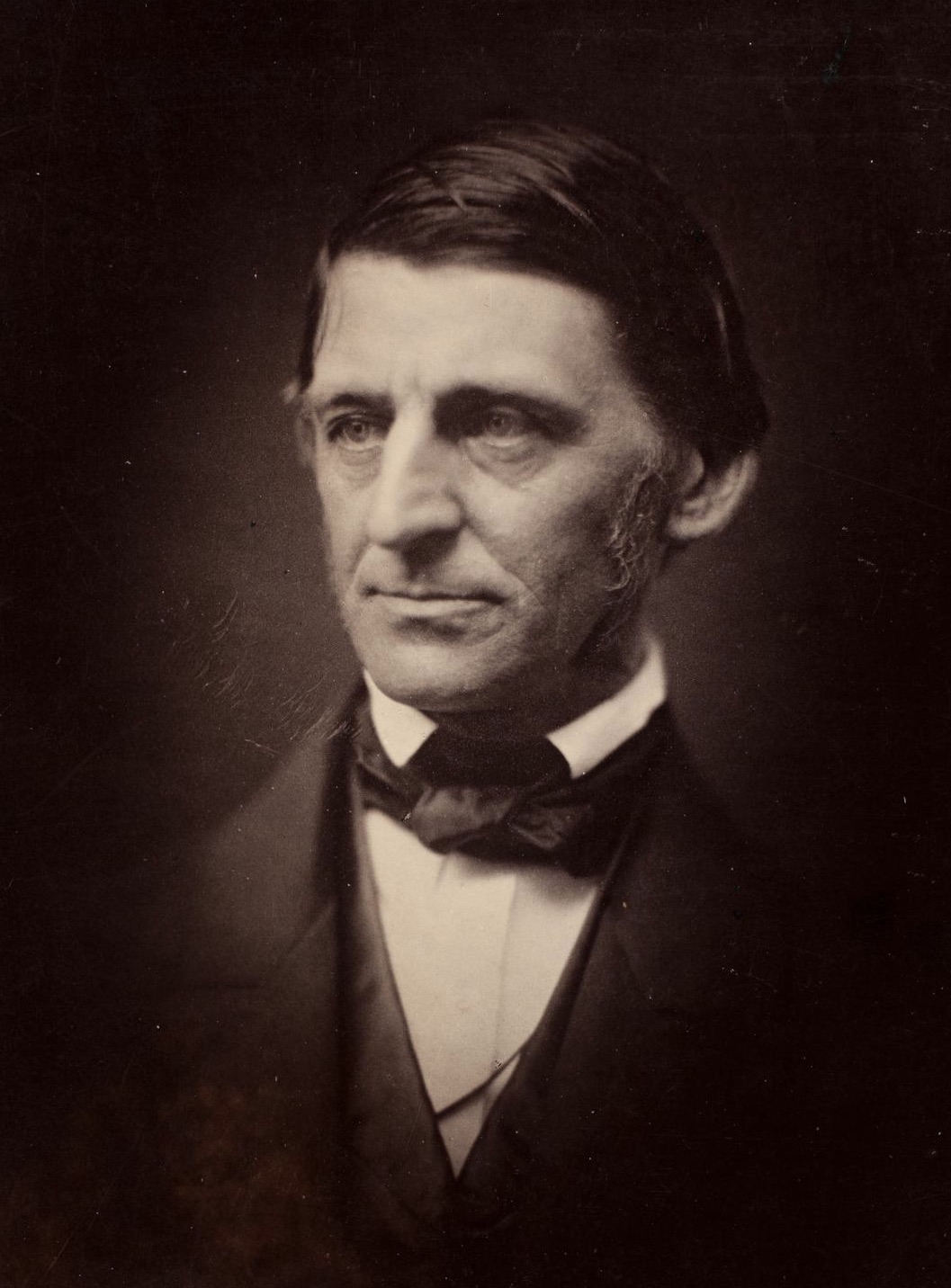
Ralph Waldo Emerson

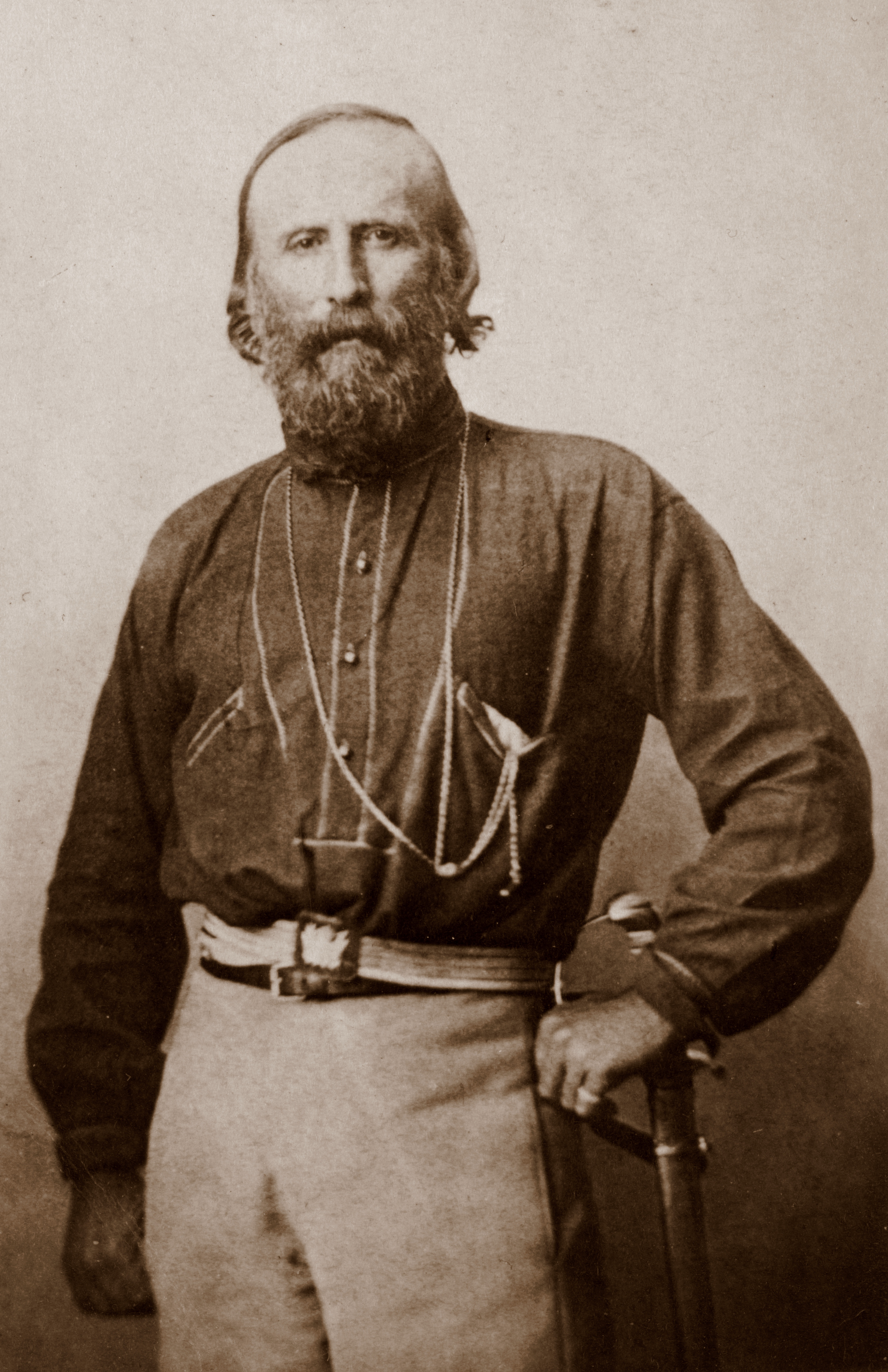
Giuseppe Garibaldi

- January 6 – Richard Henry Dana Jr., founder of Dana Point, California (b. 1815)
- January 7 – Ignacy Łukasiewicz, Polish pharmacist, inventor of the first method of distilling kerosene from seep oil, creator of the first oil lamp (b. 1822)
- January 10 – Henri Jules Bataille, French general (b. 1816)
- January 11 – Theodor Schwann, German physiologist (b. 1810)
- January 13 – Juraj Dobrila, Croatian bishop (b. 1812)
- January 27 – Robert Christison, Scottish toxicologist, physician (b. 1797)
- February 5 – Elizabeth Louisa Foster Mather, American writer (b. 1815)
- March 9 – Giovanni Lanza, Italian politician (b. 1810)
- March 19 – Carl Robert Jakobson, Estonian writer, politician, and teacher (b. 1841)
- March 21 – Constantin Bosianu, 4th Prime Minister of Romania (b. 1815)
- March 23 – Gustavus H. Scott, American admiral (b. 1812)
- March 24 – Henry Wadsworth Longfellow, American author (b. 1807)
- April 3 – Jesse James, American Western outlaw (b. 1847)
- April 9 – Dante Gabriel Rossetti, English poet, painter (b. 1828)
- April 11 – John Lenthall, American naval architect, shipbuilder (b. 1807)
- April 13 – Bruno Bauer, German philosopher and theologian (b. 1809)
- April 14 – Henri Giffard, French balloonist, aviation pioneer (b. 1825)
- April 17
  - George Jennings, English sanitary engineer (b. 1801)
  - Antonio Fontanesi, Italian painter (b. 1818)
- April 19 – Charles Darwin, British naturalist (b. 1809)
- April 25 – Johann Karl Friedrich Zöllner, German astrophysicist (b. 1834)
- April 27 – Ralph Waldo Emerson, American philosopher, writer (b. 1803)
- May 3 – Leonidas Smolents, Austrian–Greek general and army minister (b. 1806)
- May 5 – John Rodgers, American admiral (b. 1812)
- June 2 – Giuseppe Garibaldi, Italian patriot (b. 1807)
- June 3 – Christian Wilberg, German painter (b. 1839)
- June 22 – Pablo Buitrago y Benavente, First democratically elected Supreme Director of Nicaragua (b. 1807)
- June 25 – François Jouffroy, French sculptor (b. 1806)
- June 30
  - Alberto Henschel, German-Brazilian photographer, businessman (b. 1827)
  - Charles J. Guiteau, American preacher, writer, lawyer, assassin of James A. Garfield (executed) (b. 1841)

=== July–December ===
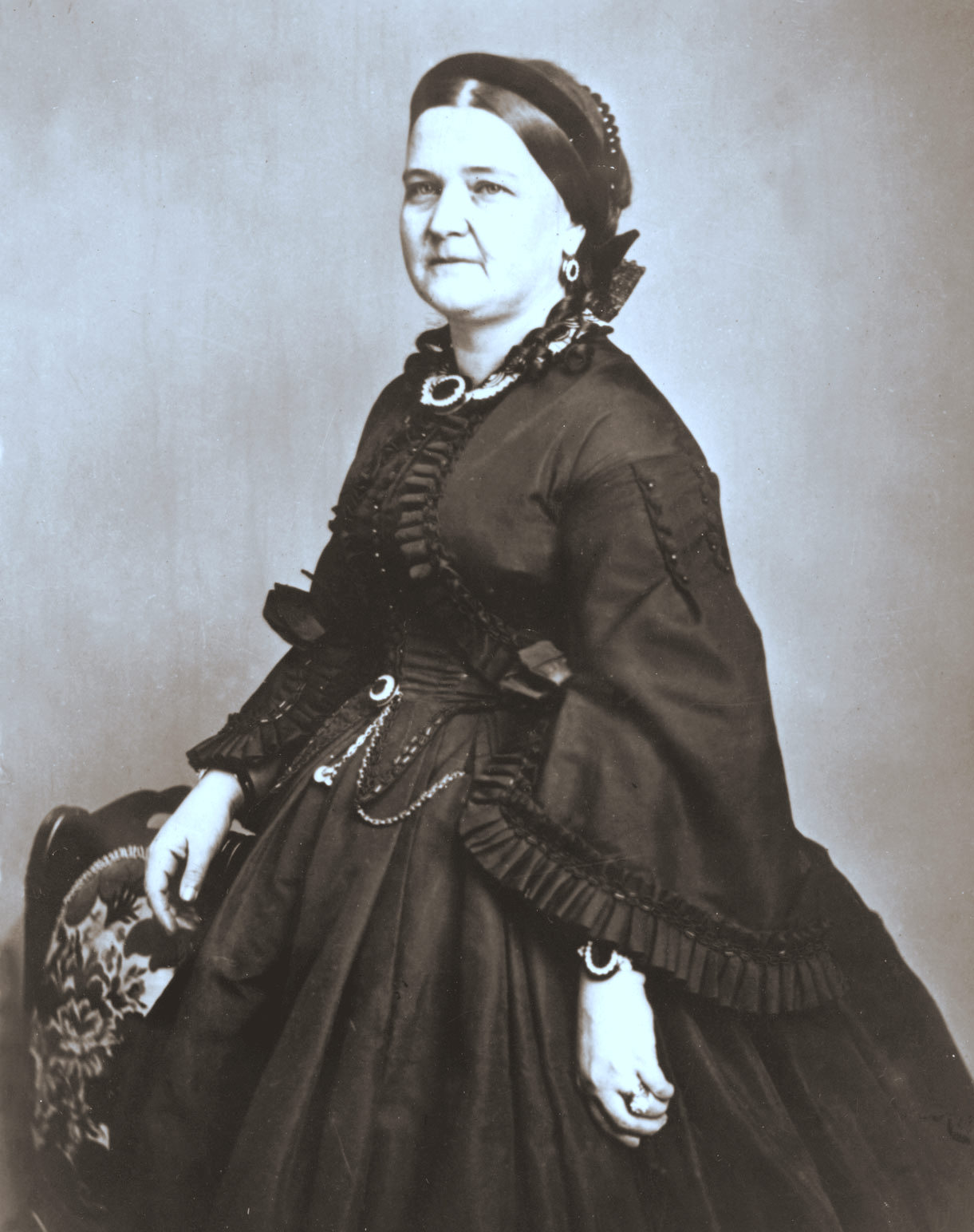
Mary Todd Lincoln

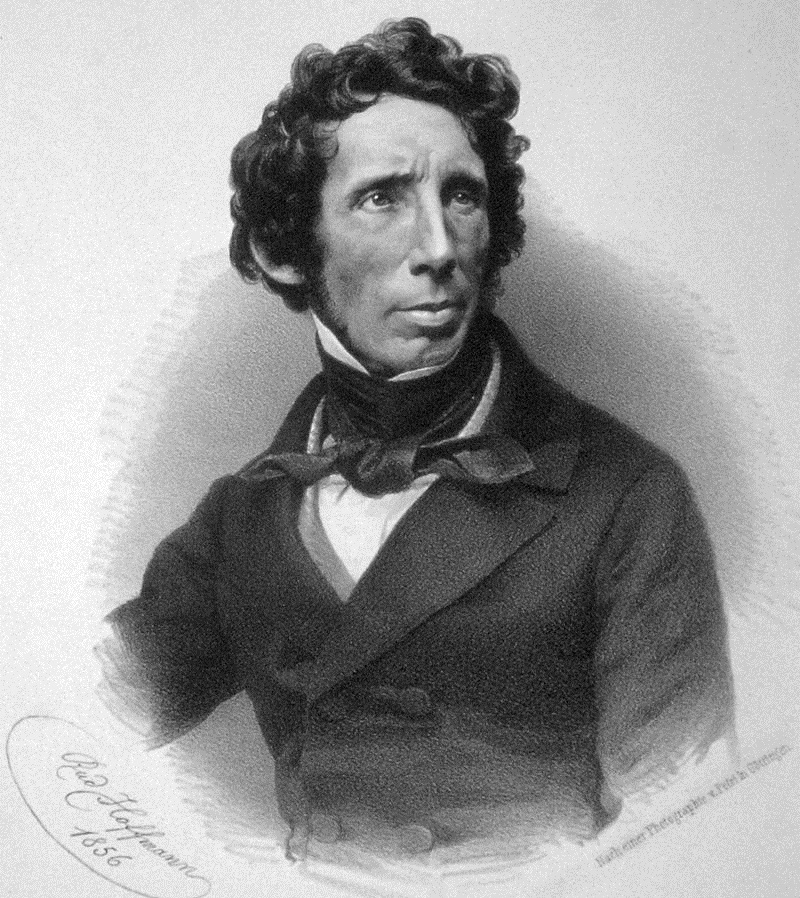
Friedrich Wöhler

- July 4 – Joseph Brackett, American Shaker religious leader, composer (b. 1797)
- July 7 – Mikhail Skobelev, Russian general (b. 1843)
- July 13 – Johnny Ringo, American cowboy (b. 1850)
- July 16 – Mary Todd Lincoln, First Lady of the United States (b. 1818)
- July 19 – John William Bean, English criminal (b. 1824)
- July 20 – Fanny Parnell, Irish poet, founder of the Ladies' Land League (b. 1848)
- July 23 – George Perkins Marsh, American diplomat, philologist and pioneer environmentalist (b. 1801)
- August 4 – Samuel Barron Stephens, American attorney and politician (b. 1814)
- August 13 – William Stanley Jevons, English economist and logician (b. 1835)
- August 16 – Auguste-Alexandre Ducrot, French general (b. 1817)
- August 25 – Friedrich Reinhold Kreutzwald, Estonian writer, physician (b. 1803)
- August 31 – Pedro Luiz Napoleão Chernoviz, Brazilian physician, writer and publisher (b. 1812)
- September 8 – Joseph Liouville, French mathematician (b. 1809)
- September 14 – Georges Leclanché, French electrical engineer and inventor (b. 1839)
- September 16 – Edward Bouverie Pusey, British churchman (b. 1800)
- September 23 – Friedrich Wöhler, German chemist (b. 1800)
- September 30 – José Milla y Vidaurre, Guatemalan writer (b. 1822)
- October 13 – Arthur de Gobineau, French writer, demographist (b. 1816)
- November 7 – Julius Hübner, German painter (b. 1806)
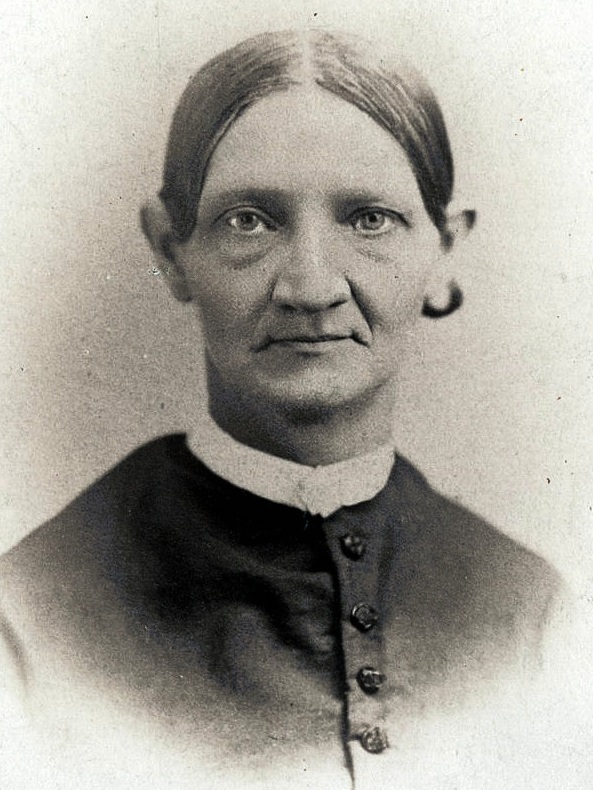
  Lucy Smith Millikin
- November 14 – Billy Claiborne, American gunfighter (b. 1860)
- November 20 – Henry Draper, American astronomer (b. 1837)
- December 3 – Archibald Campbell Tait, Archbishop of Canterbury (b. 1811)
- December 6
  - Alfred Escher, Swiss politician, railroad entrepreneur (b. 1819)
  - Louis Blanc, French politician, historian (b. 1811)
  - Anthony Trollope, British novelist, postal service official (b. 1815)
- December 9 – Lucy Smith Millikin, early Latter Day Saint and sister of Joseph Smith (b. 1821)
- December 10 – Alexander Gardner, Scottish photographer (b. 1821)
- December 18 – Henry James Sr., American theologian (b. 1811)
- December 21 – Francesco Hayez, Italian painter (b. 1791)
- December 27 – Giovanni Losi, Italian Combonian missionary (b. 1838)
- December 31 – Léon Gambetta, French statesman (b. 1838)

=== Date unknown ===
- Eugénie Luce, French educator (b. 1804)

1883

=== January–June ===
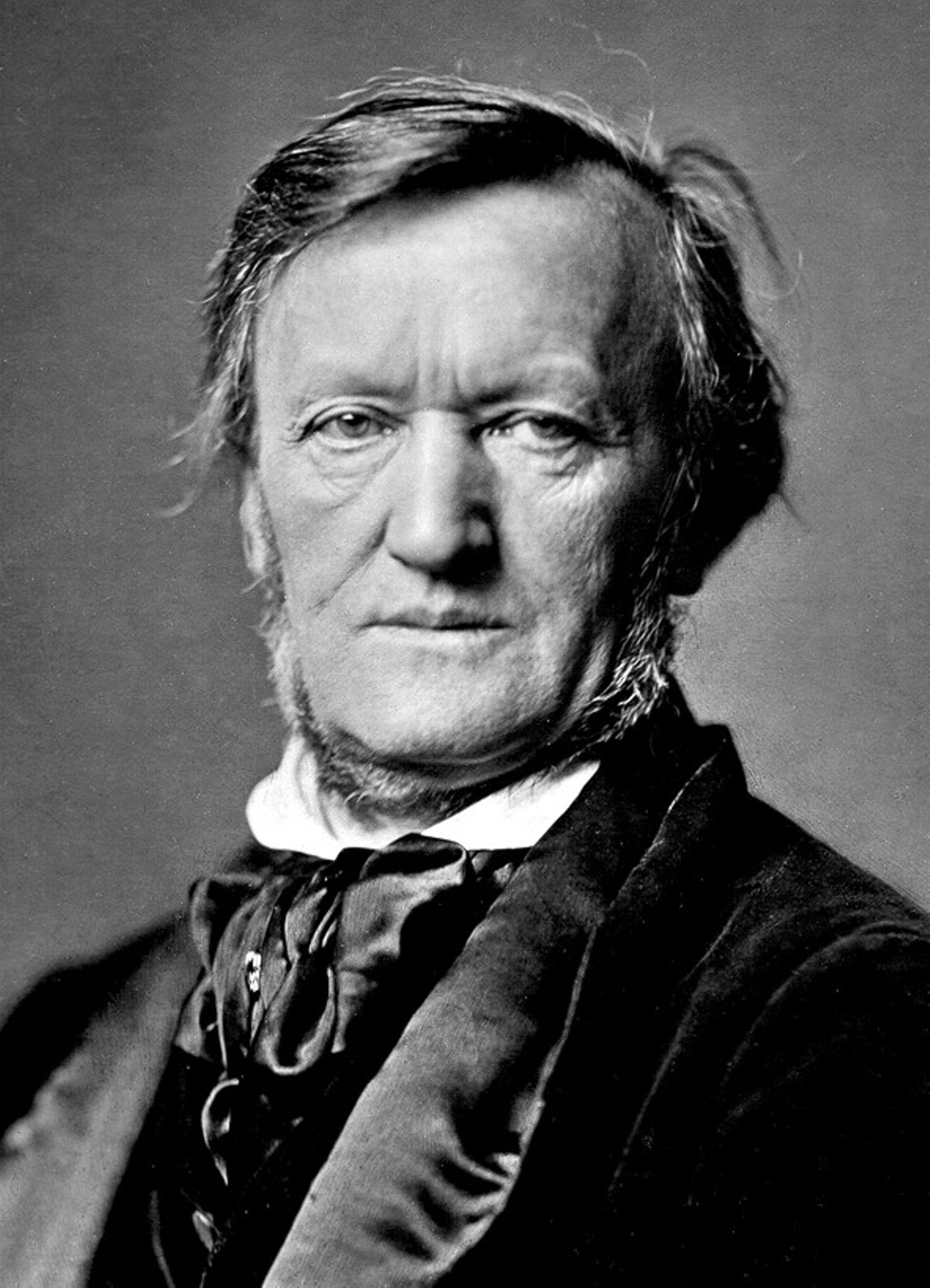
Richard Wagner

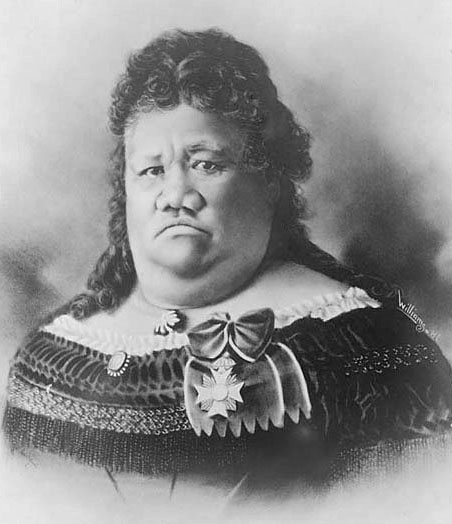
Keʻelikōlani

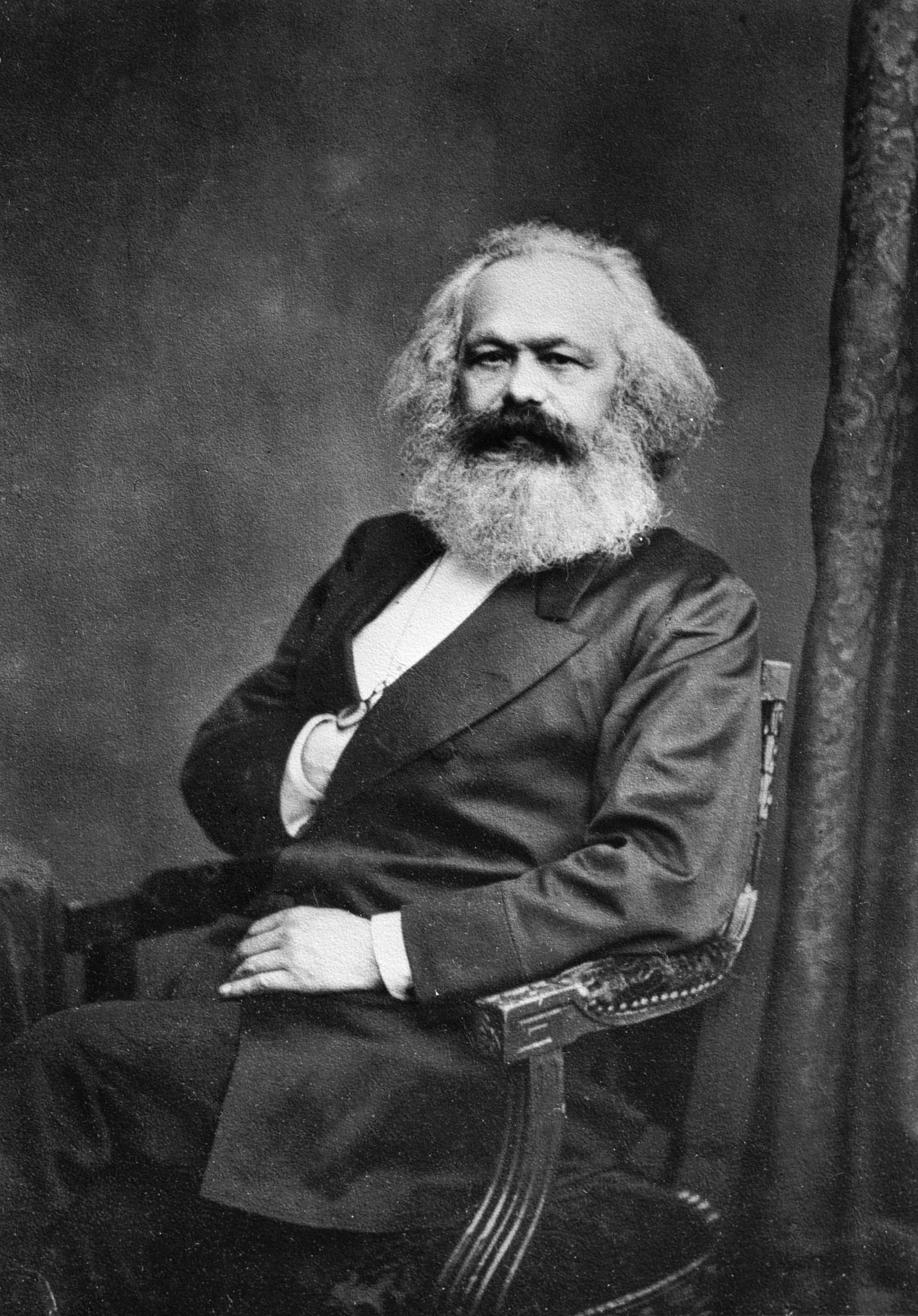
Karl Marx

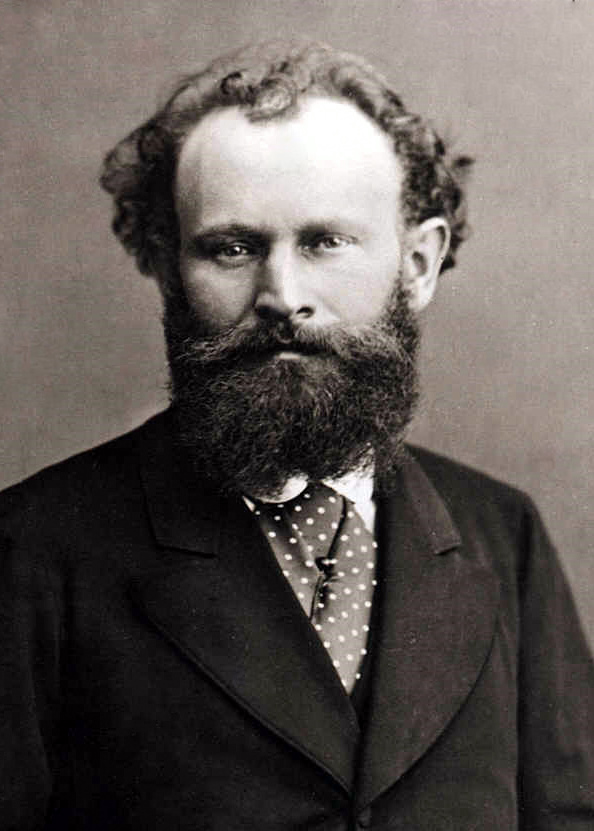
Édouard Manet

- January 4 – Antoine Chanzy, French general and colonial governor (b. 1823)
- January 8 – Miska Magyarics, Slovene poet in Hungary (b. 1825)
- January 10
  - Samuel Mudd, American doctor to John Wilkes Booth (b. 1833)
  - Elling Eielsen, Norwegian Lutheran leader (b. 1804)
- January 17 – Matilde Diez, Spanish actress (b. 1818)
- January 23 – Gustave Doré, French artist (b. 1832)
- January 24 – Friedrich von Flotow, German composer (b. 1812)
- February 13 – Richard Wagner, German composer (b. 1813)
- February 15 – Prince Kachō Hiroatsu of Japan (b. 1875)
- February 17
  - Napoléon Coste, French guitarist and composer (b. 1806)
  - Vasudev Balwant Phadke, Indian revolutionary (b. 1845)
- February 18 – Francis Abbott, Australian astronomer (b. 1799)
- March 4 – Alexander Hamilton Stephens, Vice President of the Confederate States of America (b. 1812)
- March 14 – Karl Marx, German communist philosopher (b. 1818)
- March 20 – Charles Lasègue, French physician (b. 1816)
- March 21 – Grigol Orbeliani, Georgian poet and soldier (b. 1804)
- March 27 – John Brown, Scottish personal servant and favourite of Queen Victoria (b. 1826)
- March 28 – Napoleon Bonaparte Buford, American general and railroad executive (b. 1807)
- April 4 – Peter Cooper, American industrialist, inventor and philanthropist (b. 1791)
- April 13 – Archduchess Maria Antonietta of Austria, Princess of Tuscany (b. 1858)
- April 15 – Frederick Francis II, Grand Duke of Mecklenburg-Schwerin (b. 1823)
- April 16 – Charles II of Parma (b. 1799)
- April 26 – Napoleon Orda, Belarusian composer and artist (b. 1807)
- April 30 – Édouard Manet, French painter (b. 1832)
- May 6 – Cecilia Fryxell, Swedish educational pioneer (b. 1806)
- May 24 – Keʻelikōlani, princess of Hawaii (b. 1826)
- May 26 – Abdelkader El Djezairi, Algerian leader (b. 1808)
- June 6 – Ciprian Porumbescu, Romanian composer (b. 1853)
- June 11 – Caroline Leigh Gascoigne, English writer (b. 1813)
- June 20 – John Colenso, English-born mathematician and theologian, Bishop of Natal (b. 1814)
- June 26 – Edward Sabine, Irish astronomer (b. 1788)

=== July–December ===
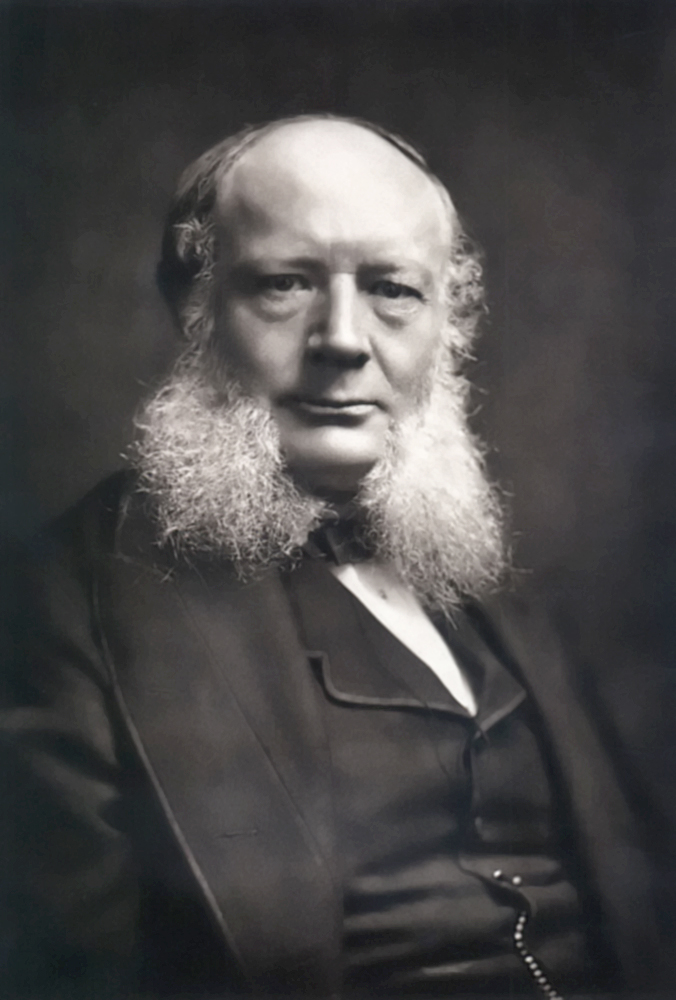
Carl Wilhelm Siemens

- July 15 – General Tom Thumb, American circus performer and entertainer (b. 1838)
- July 22 – Edward Ord, U.S. Army officer (b. 1818)
- July 23 – Rose Massey, English actress (b. 1851?)
- July 24 – Matthew Webb, English sailor, first recorded person to swim the English Channel without the use of artificial aids (b. 1848)
- July 27 – Montgomery Blair, American politician (b. 1813)
- July 28 – Carlo Pellion di Persano, Italian admiral and politician (b. 1806)
- August 24 – Henri, Count of Chambord, pretender to the French throne (b. 1820)
- August 25 – Louise Lateau, Belgian mystic and stigmatist (b. 1850)
- September 3 – Ivan Turgenev, Russian writer (b. 1818)
- September 10 – Otto Pius Hippius, Baltic German architect (b. 1826)
- September 17 – Junius Brutus Booth Jr., American actor and theatre manager (b. 1821)
- September 24 – Selina Jenkinson, British aristocrat (b. 1812)
- October 5 – Joachim Barrande, French palaeontologist (b. 1799)
- October 14 – Sir Arthur Elton, 7th Baronet, English writer and Liberal Party politician (b. 1818)
- October 20 – George Chichester, 3rd Marquess of Donegall, Anglo-Irish landowner, courtier and politician (b. 1797)
- October 22 – Thomas Mayne Reid, Irish-American novelist (b. 1818)
- October 30
  - Dayananda Saraswati, Hindu religious leader (b. 1824)
  - Robert Volkmann, German composer (b. 1815)
- November 19 – Carl Wilhelm Siemens, German engineer (b. 1823)
- November 20 – Tenshoin, wife of 13th Shōgun of Japan, Tokugawa Iesada (b.1836)
- November 29 – Elisabeth Dieudonné Vincent, Haitian-born migrant and free woman of colour (b. 1798)
- December 13 – Victor de Laprade, French poet and critic (b. 1812)
- December 27 – Andrew A. Humphreys, American general and civil engineer (b. 1810)

=== Dates unknown ===
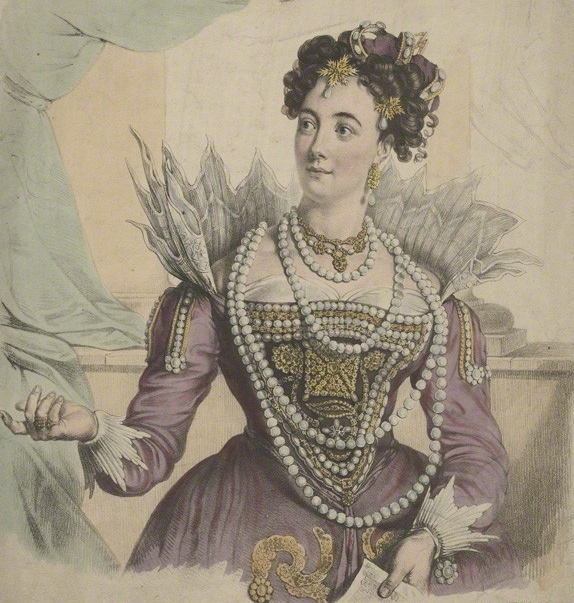
Margaret Agnes Bunn

- Margaret Agnes Bunn, British actress (b. 1799)
- Jules Miot, French republican socialist (b. 1809)

1884

=== January–June ===
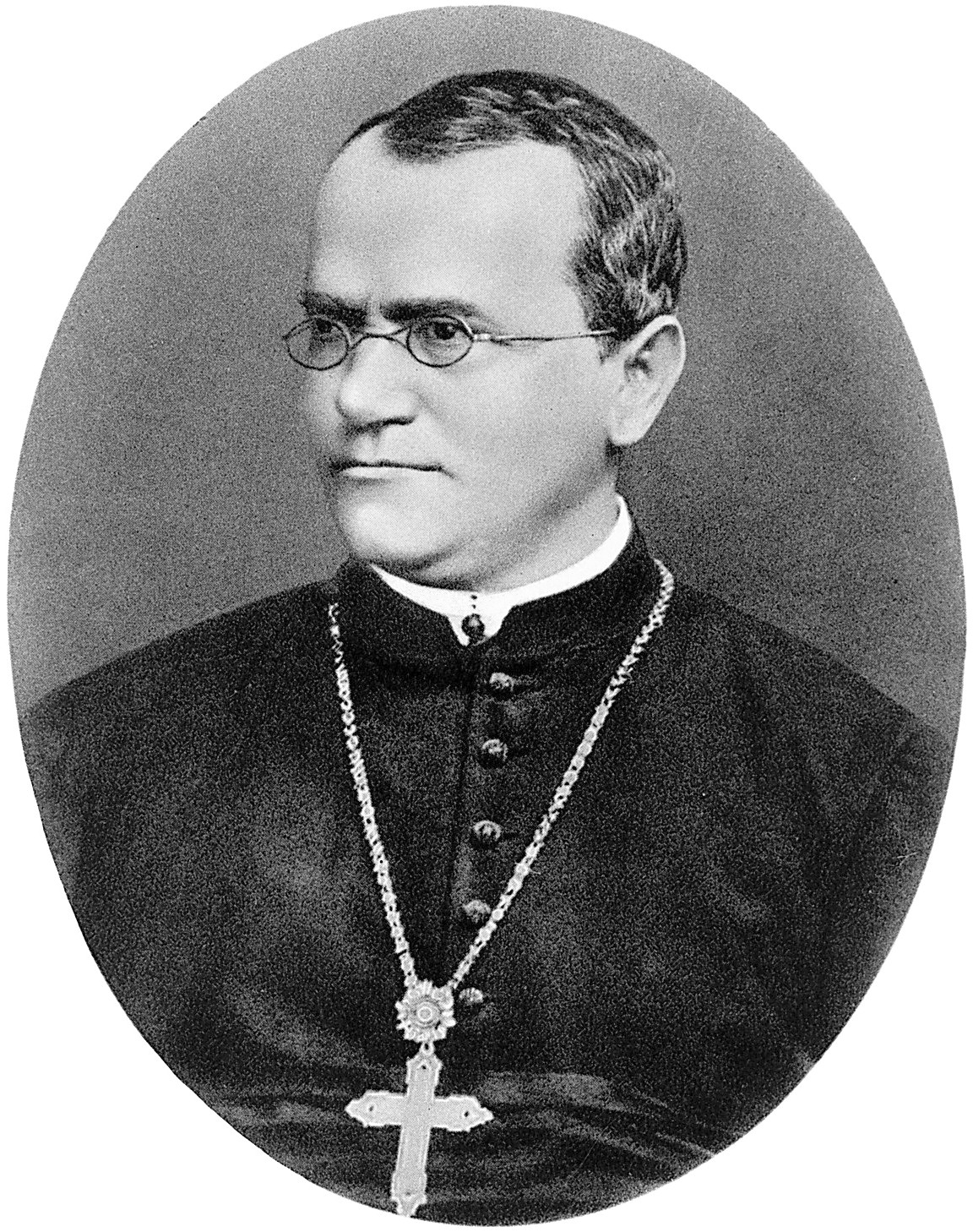
Gregor Mendel

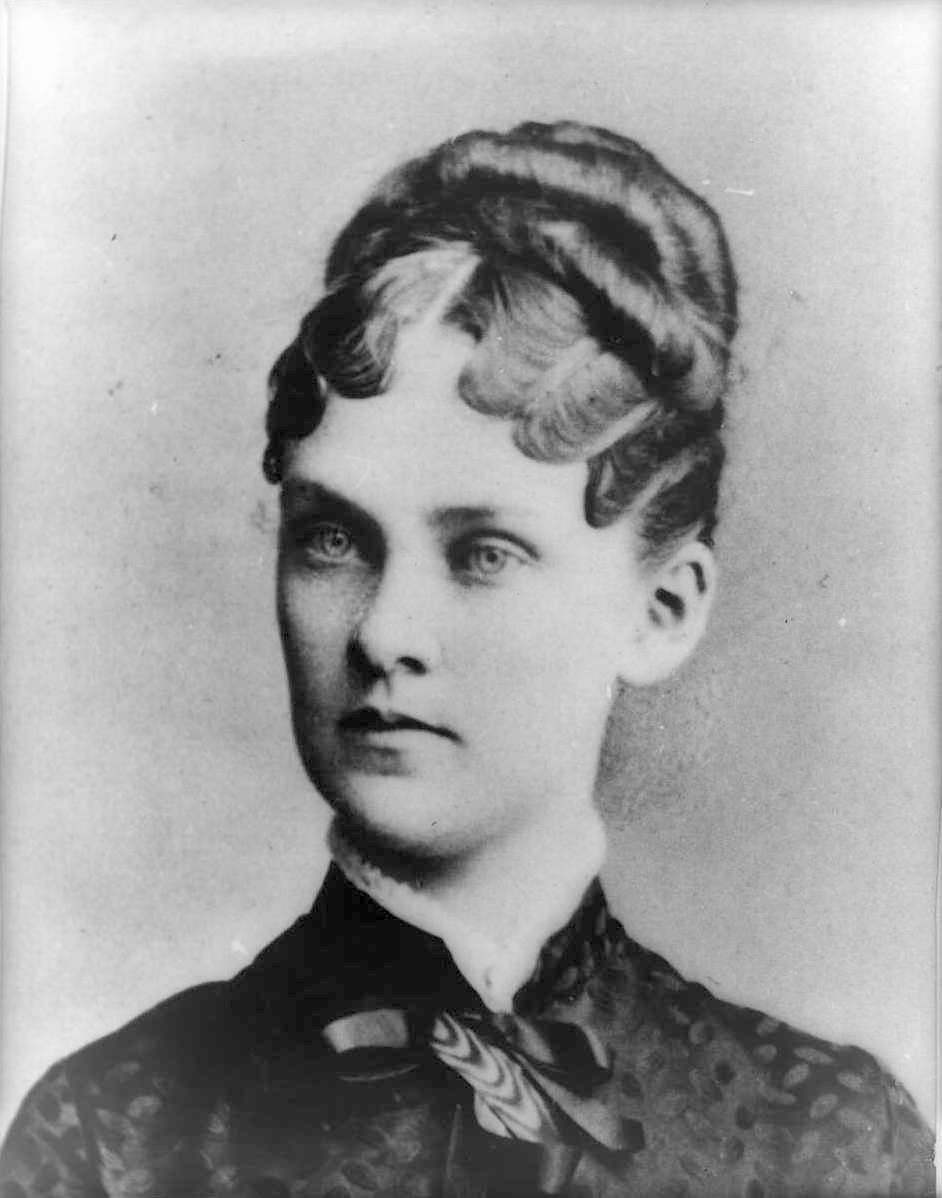
Alice Hathaway Lee Roosevelt

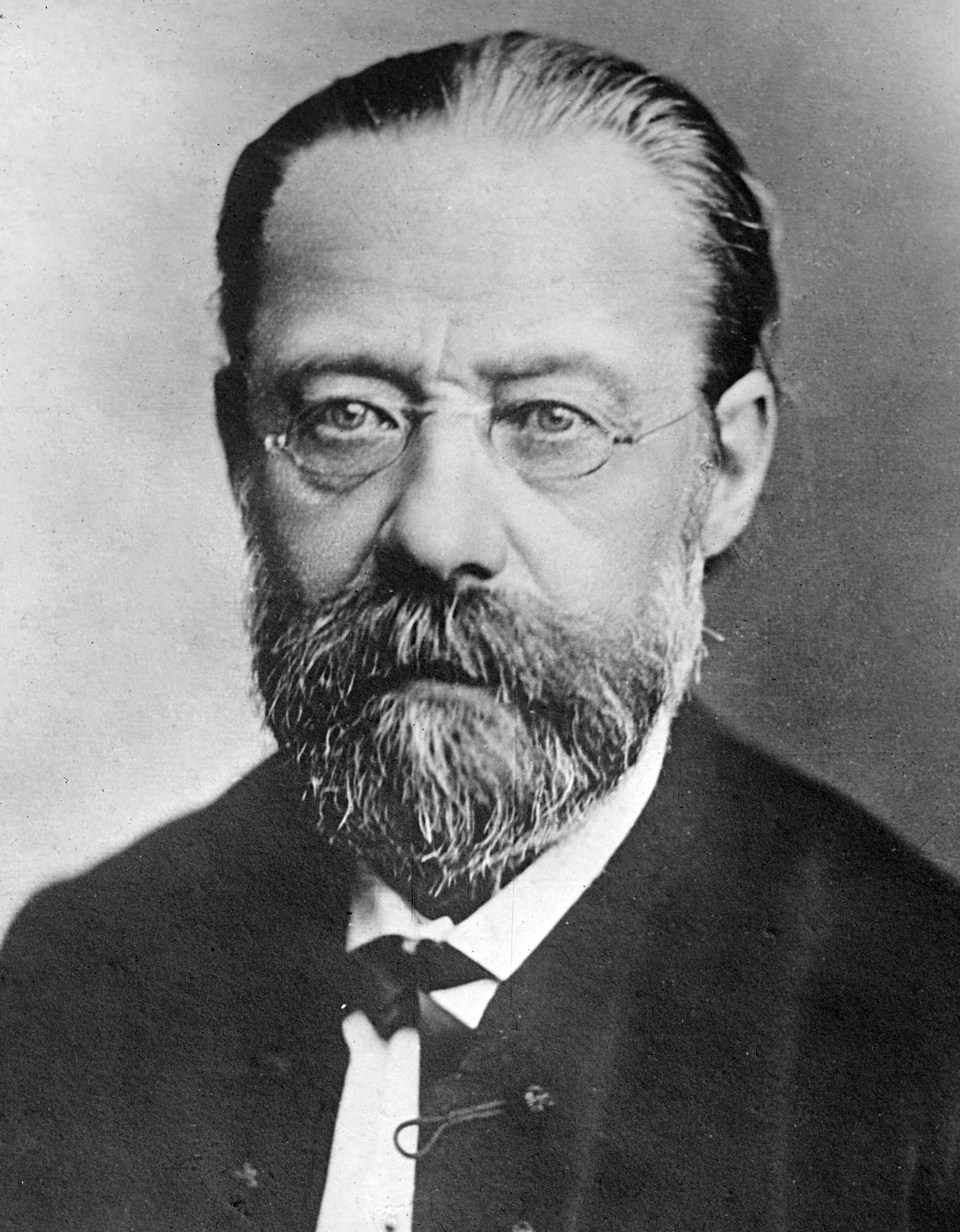
Bedřich Smetana

- January 6 – Gregor Mendel, Czech geneticist (b. 1822)
- January 25 – Johann Gottfried Piefke, German conductor, composer (b. 1815)
- February 8 – Cetshwayo kaMpande, Zulu king (b. 1826)
- February 13 – Wilhelm von Tümpling, Prussian general (b. 1809)
- February 14
  - Alice Hathaway Lee Roosevelt, first wife of Theodore Roosevelt (b. 1861)
  - Martha Bulloch Roosevelt, mother of Theodore Roosevelt (b. 1835)
- February 26 – Emmanuel Félix de Wimpffen, French general (b. 1811)
- March 1 – Isaac Todhunter, English mathematician (b. 1820)
- March 8 – Sydney Dacres, British admiral (b. 1804)
- March 13 – Leland Stanford Jr., son of Governor Leland Stanford of California, in whose memory Stanford University was founded (b. 1868)
- March 19 – Elias Lönnrot, Finnish philologist, collector of traditional Finnish oral poetry (b. 1802)
- March 21
  - Ezra Abbot, American Bible scholar (b. 1819)
  - Constantin A. Kretzulescu, 7th prime minister of Romania (b. 1809)
- March 23 – Henry C. Lord, American railroad executive (b. 1824)
- March 28 – Prince Leopold, Duke of Albany, youngest son of Queen Victoria (b. 1853)
- April 1 – Marie Litton, English stage actress (b. 1847)
- April 4 – Marie Bashkirtseff, Russian artist (b. 1858)
- April 6 – Emanuel Geibel, German poet, dramatist (b. 1815)
- April 24 – Marie Taglioni, Swedish-Italian ballerina (b. 1804)
- May 6 – Judah P. Benjamin, American politician, US senator from Louisiana, Cabinet officer of the Confederate States (b. 1811)
- May 12 – Bedřich Smetana, Czech composer (b. 1824)
- May 13 – Cyrus McCormick, American inventor (b. 1809)
- May 29 – Sir Henry Bartle Frere, British colonial administrator (b. 1815)
- June 19
  - Juan Bautista Alberdi, Argentine politician, writer and main Constitution promoter (b. 1810)
  - Johann Gustav Droysen, German historian (b. 1808)
- June 21 – Alexander, Prince of Orange, heir apparent to the Dutch throne (b. 1851)
- June 25 – Hans Rott, Austrian composer (b. 1858)

=== July–December ===
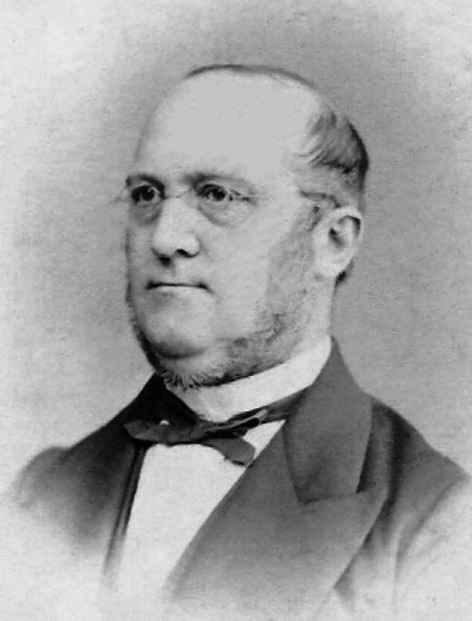
Adolph Wilhelm Hermann Kolbe

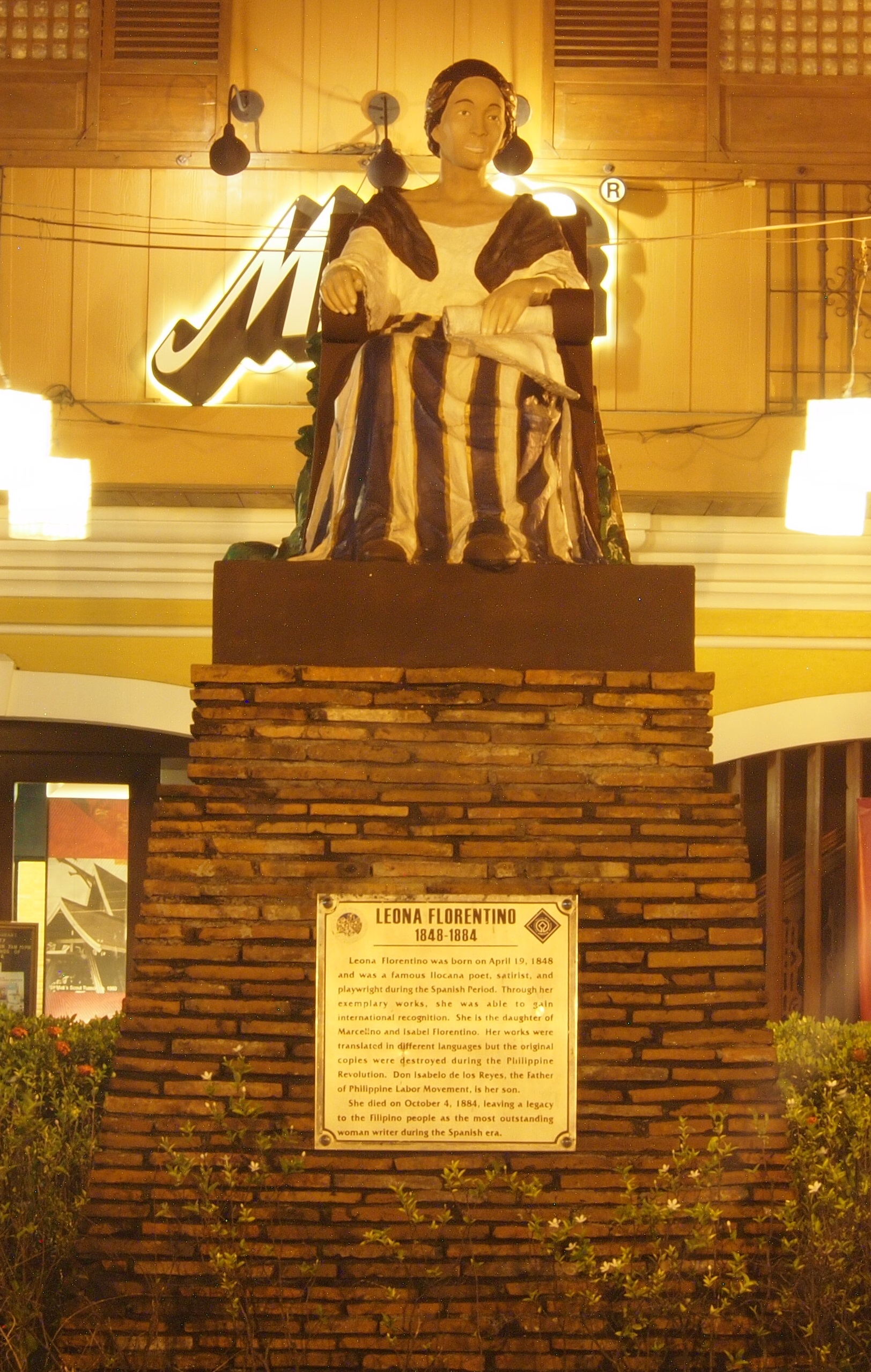
Leona Florentino

- July 1 – Allan Pinkerton, American detective (b. 1819)
- July 10 – Paul Morphy, American chess player (b. 1837)
- July 15
  - Henry Wellesley, 1st Earl Cowley, British diplomat (b. 1804)
  - Almira Hart Lincoln Phelps, American educator, author (b. 1793)
- August 9 – Annestine Beyer, Danish reform pedagogue (b. 1795)
- August 18 – Mary C. Ames, American writer (b. 1831)
- September 2 – Karl Eberhard Herwarth von Bittenfeld, Prussian field marshal (b. 1796)
- September 10 – George Bentham, English botanist (b. 1800)
- October 4 – Leona Florentino, Filipina poet (b. 1849)
- October 7 – Bernard Petitjean, French Roman Catholic missionary to Japan (b. 1829)
- October 16 – Bernice Pauahi Bishop, Hawaiian ali‘i (b. 1831)
- October 18 – William VIII, Duke of Brunswick (b. 1806)
- November 3 – Menyhért Lónyay, 5th prime minister of Hungary (b. 1822)
- November 11 – Alfred Brehm, German zoologist (b. 1829)
- November 16 – František Chvostek, Moravian physician (b. 1835)
- November 25 – Adolph Wilhelm Hermann Kolbe, German chemist (b. 1818)
- December 1 – William Swainson, second, and last, Attorney-General of the Crown Colony of New Zealand (b. 1809)
- December 3 – Jane C. Bonar, Scottish hymnwriter (b. 1821)
- December 20 – Domenico Consolini, Italian Catholic Cardinal (b. 1806)

1885

=== January–June ===
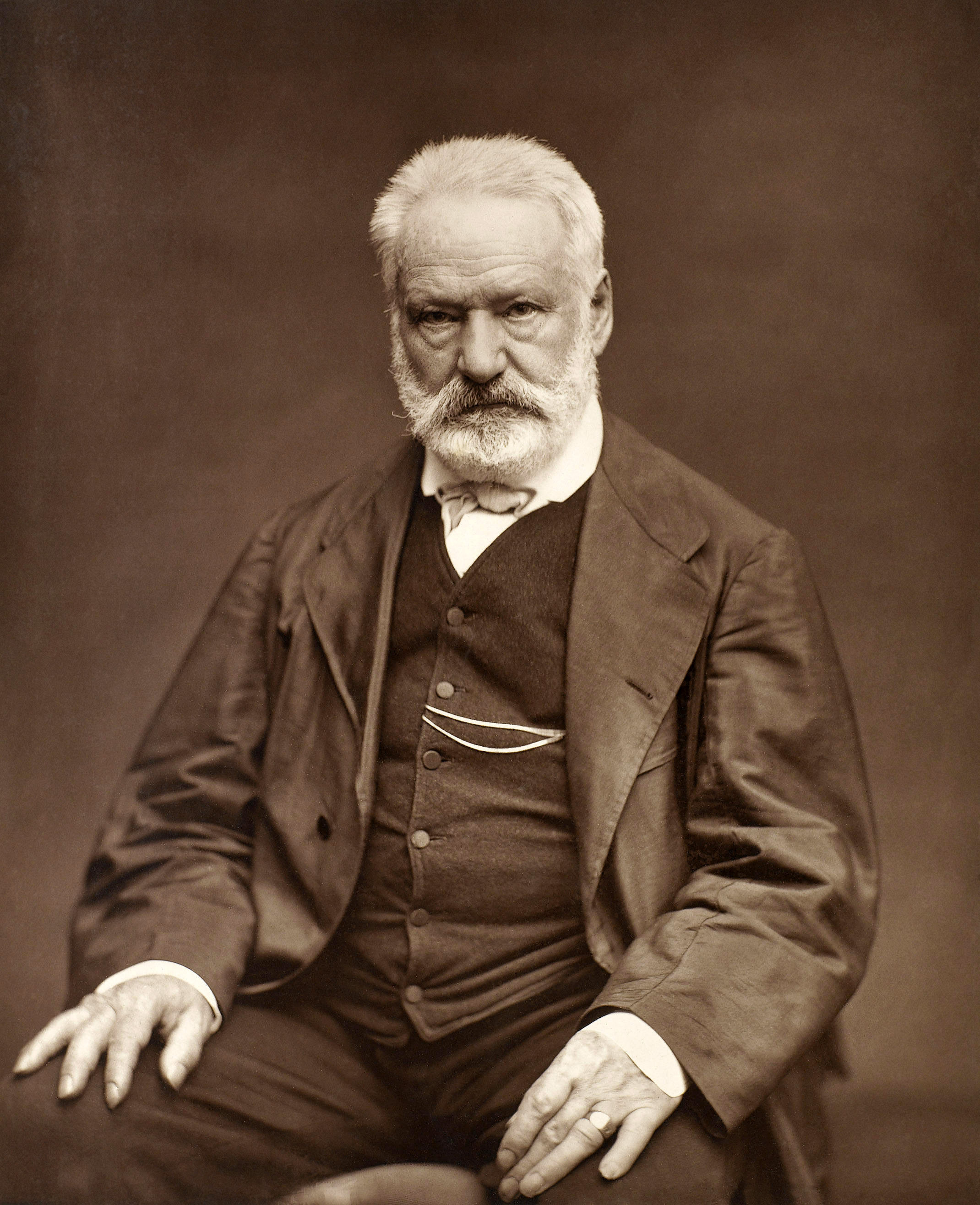
Victor Hugo

- January 11 – Mariano Ospina Rodríguez, President of Colombia (b. 1805)
- January 13 – Schuyler Colfax, 17th Vice President of the United States (b. 1823)
- January 26 – Charles "Chinese" Gordon, British general (killed in battle) (b. 1833)
- February 1 – Sidney Gilchrist Thomas, British inventor (b. 1850)
- February 7 – Iwasaki Yataro, Japanese industrialist, Founder of Mitsubishi (b. 1835)
- February 8 – Nikolai Severtsov, Russian explorer, naturalist (b. 1827)
- February 19 – José María Pinedo, Argentinian naval commander (b. 1795)
- March 12 – Próspero Fernández Oreamuno, President of Costa Rica (b. 1834)
- March 13 – Giorgio Mitrovich, Maltese politician (b. 1795)
- March 22 – Sir Harry Smith Parkes, British diplomat (b. 1828)
- April 2 – Justo Rufino Barrios, Central American leader (b. 1835)
- April 6 – Eduard Vogel von Falckenstein, Prussian general (b. 1797)
- April 25 – Queen Emma of Hawaii (b. 1836)
- May 2 – Terézia Zakoucs, Hungarian Slovene author (b. 1817)
- May 4 – Irvin McDowell, American general (b. 1818)
- May 17 – Jonathan Young, United States Navy commodore (b. 1826)
- May 19 – Robert Emmet Odlum, American swimming instructor (died as result of becoming the first person to jump from the Brooklyn Bridge) (b. 1851)
- May 20 – Frederick Theodore Frelinghuysen, 29th United States Secretary of State (b. 1817)
- May 22 – Victor Hugo, French author (b. 1802)
- June 11 – Amédée Courbet, French admiral (b. 1827)
- June 17 – Edwin Freiherr von Manteuffel, German field marshal (b. 1809)
- June 22 – Muhammad Ahmad, Sudanese Mahdi (b. 1844)

=== July–December ===
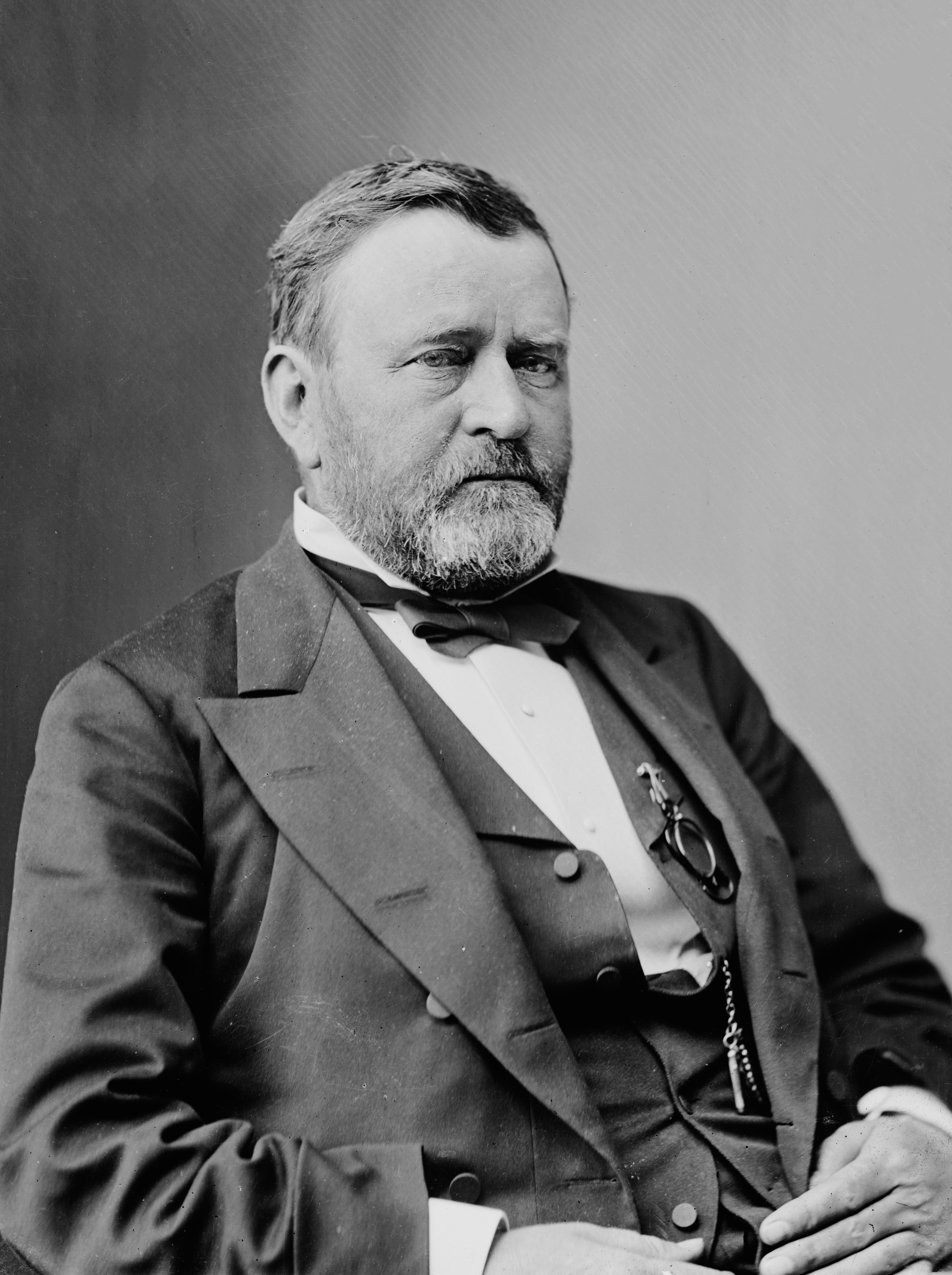
Ulysses S. Grant

- July 21 – Karolina Sobańska, Polish noble, agent (b. 1795)
- July 23 – Ulysses S. Grant, 63, American Civil War general, 18th President of the United States (b. 1822)
- August – Aga Khan II, Iranian religious leader (b. 1830)
- August 6 – Emil Zsigmondy, Austrian mountaineer (b. 1861)
- August 10 – James W. Marshall, American contractor, builder of Sutter's Mill (b. 1810)
- August 29 – Moriz Ludassy, Hungarian journalist (b. 1825)
- September 2 – Giuseppe Bonavia, Maltese architect (b. 1821)
- September 5 – Zuo Zongtang, Chinese general and politician (b. 1812)
- September 6 – Narcís Monturiol, Catalan intellectual, artist and engineer, inventor of the first combustion engine-driven submarine, which was propelled by an early form of air-independent propulsion (b. 1819)
- September 15
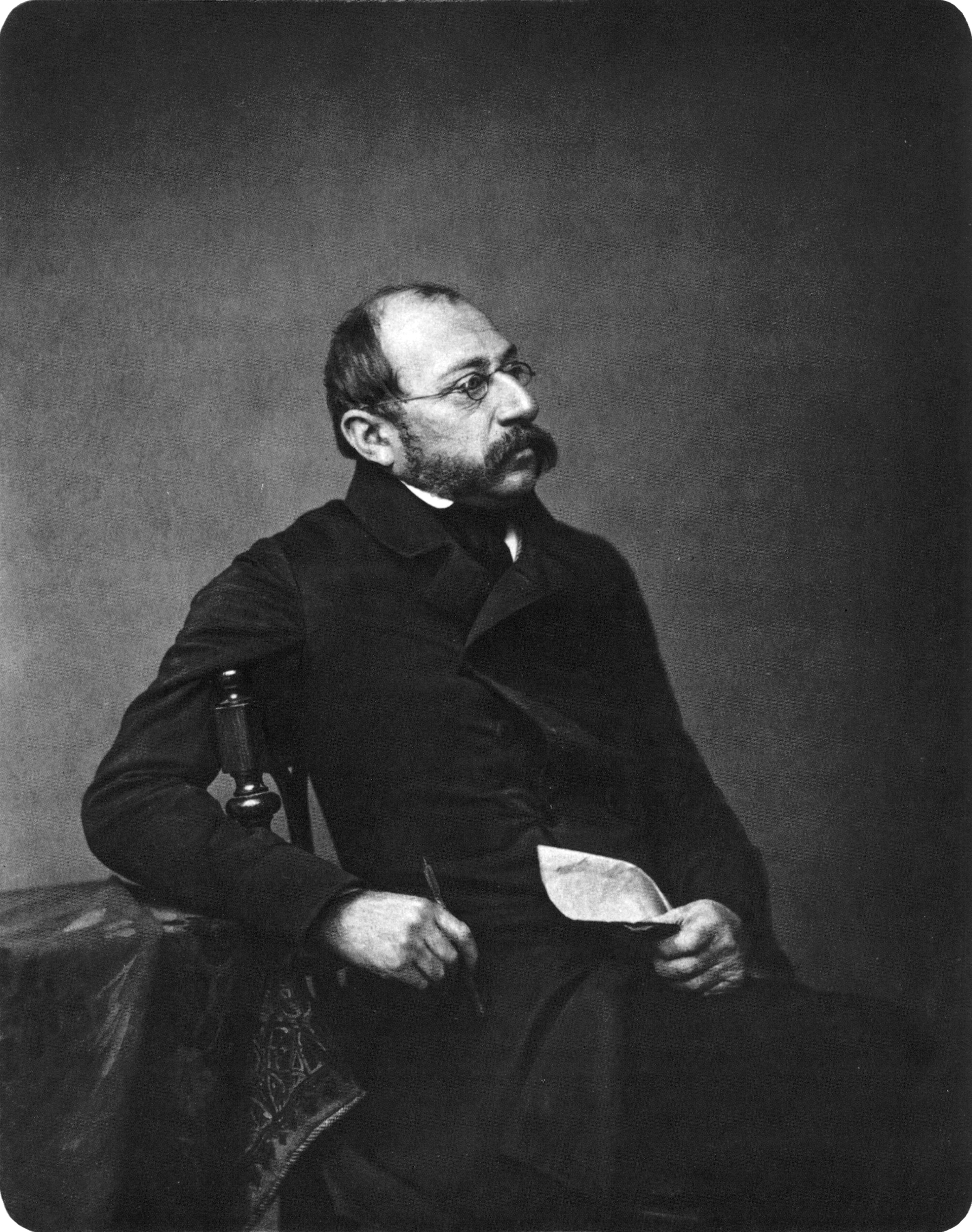
  Carl Spitzweg
  - Jumbo, African elephant, star attraction in P. T. Barnum's circus (train accident) (b. 1861)
  - Carl Spitzweg, German romanticist painter (b. 1808)
- October 1 – Anthony Ashley-Cooper, 7th Earl of Shaftesbury, British politician and philanthropist (b.1801)
- October 3 – Mazhar Nanautawi, Indian freedom struggle activist and founding figure of Mazahir Uloom (b. 1821)
- October 5 – Thomas C. Durant, American railroad financier (b. 1820)
- October 29
  - George B. McClellan, American Civil War general, politician (b. 1826)
  - Juan Bautista Topete, Spanish admiral and politician (b. 1821)
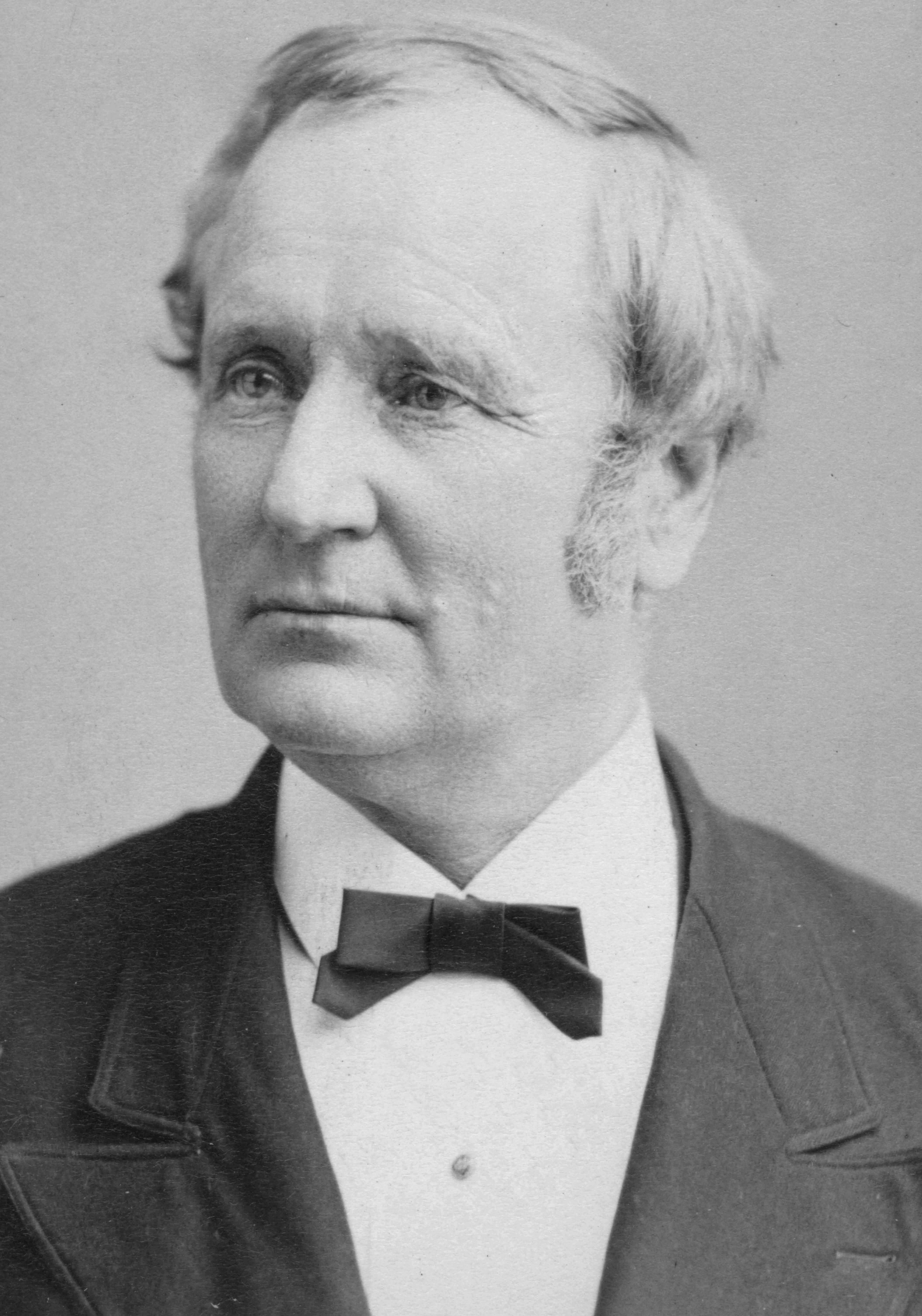
- Thomas A. Hendricks
  November 16 – Louis Riel, Canadian-American leader (executed) (b. 1844)
- November 8 – John McCullough, Irish-American actor (b. 1832)
- November 24 – Nicolás Avellaneda, Argentine president (b. 1837)
- November 25
  - King Alfonso XII of Spain (b. 1857)
  - Thomas A. Hendricks, 21st Vice President of the United States (b. 1819)
- November 26 – Thomas Andrews, Irish chemist (b. 1813)
- December 8 – William Henry Vanderbilt, American entrepreneur (b. 1821)
- December 13 – Benjamin Gratz Brown, American politician (b. 1826)
- December 15 – Ferdinand II of Portugal, consort of Queen Maria II (b. 1816)

=== Date unknown ===
- Eugenia Kisimova, Bulgarian feminist, philanthropist and women's rights activist (b. 1831)

1886

=== January–June ===
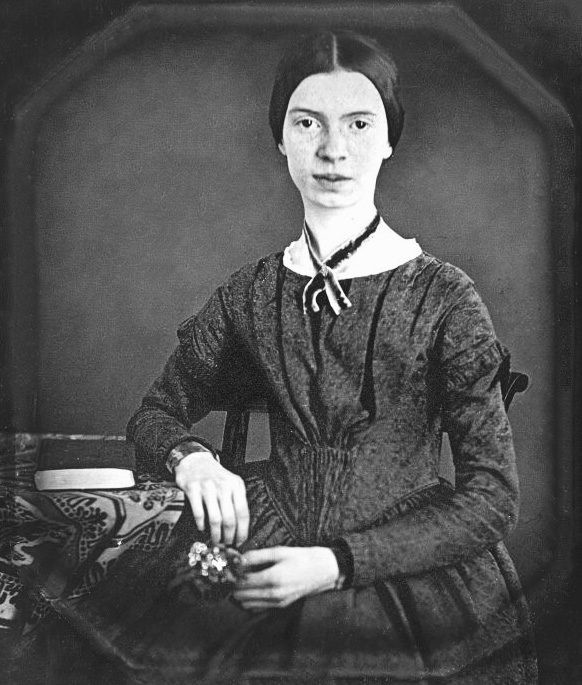
Emily Dickinson

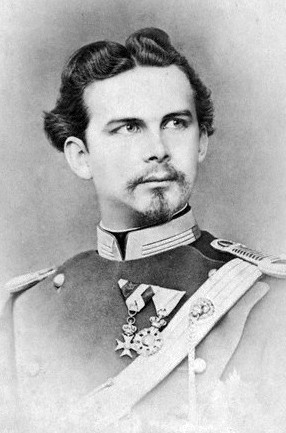
Ludwig II of Bavaria

- January 16 – Amilcare Ponchielli, Italian composer (b. 1834)
- January 18 – Baldassare Verazzi, Italian painter (b. 1819)
- January 26 – David Rice Atchison, American politician (b. 1807)
- February 9 – Winfield Scott Hancock, Union general of the American Civil War, Democratic political candidate (b. 1824)
- February 10 – Laura Don, American actress (b. 1852)
- February 12 – Horatio Seymour, 18th Governor of New York, 1868 Democratic Party presidential nominee (b. 1810)
- February 15 – Edward Cardwell, 1st Viscount Cardwell, British politician (b. 1813)
- February 18 – Dave Rudabaugh, American outlaw, gunfighter (b. 1854)
- February 24 – Hugh Stowell Brown, Manx preacher (b. 1823)
- March 9 – William S. Clark, American chemist, agricultural educator (b. 1826)
- March 17
  - Pierre-Jules Hetzel, French editor, publisher (b. 1814)
  - Leopold Zunz, German scholar of Judaism (b. 1794)
- March 29 – John Keble, English Anglican priest and poet (b. 1792)
- March 30 – Joseph-Alfred Mousseau, sixth premier of Quebec (b. 1837)
- March 31 – Giovanni Rossi, Italian composer (b. 1828)
- March – Harriet Bates, American author (b. 1856)
- April 9 – Joseph Victor von Scheffel, German poet (b. 1826)
- April 16 – Andrew Nicholl, Northern Irish painter (b. 1804)
- April 20 – Louis Melsens, Belgian chemist and physicist (b. 1814)
- April 27 – Henry Hobson Richardson, American architect (b. 1838)
- May 9 – Facundo Bacardí, Cuban rum manufacturer (b. 1814)
- May 15 – Emily Dickinson, American poet (b. 1830)
- May 17 – John Deere, American inventor (b. 1804)
- May 23 – Leopold von Ranke, German historian (b. 1795)
- June 13
  - Bernhard von Gudden, German neuroanatomist and psychiatrist (b. 1824)
  - King Ludwig II of Bavaria (b. 1845)
- June 19 – Sir Charles Trevelyan, British civil servant and colonial administrator (b. 1807)
- June 21 – Daniel Dunglas Home, Scottish medium (b. 1833)

=== July–December ===
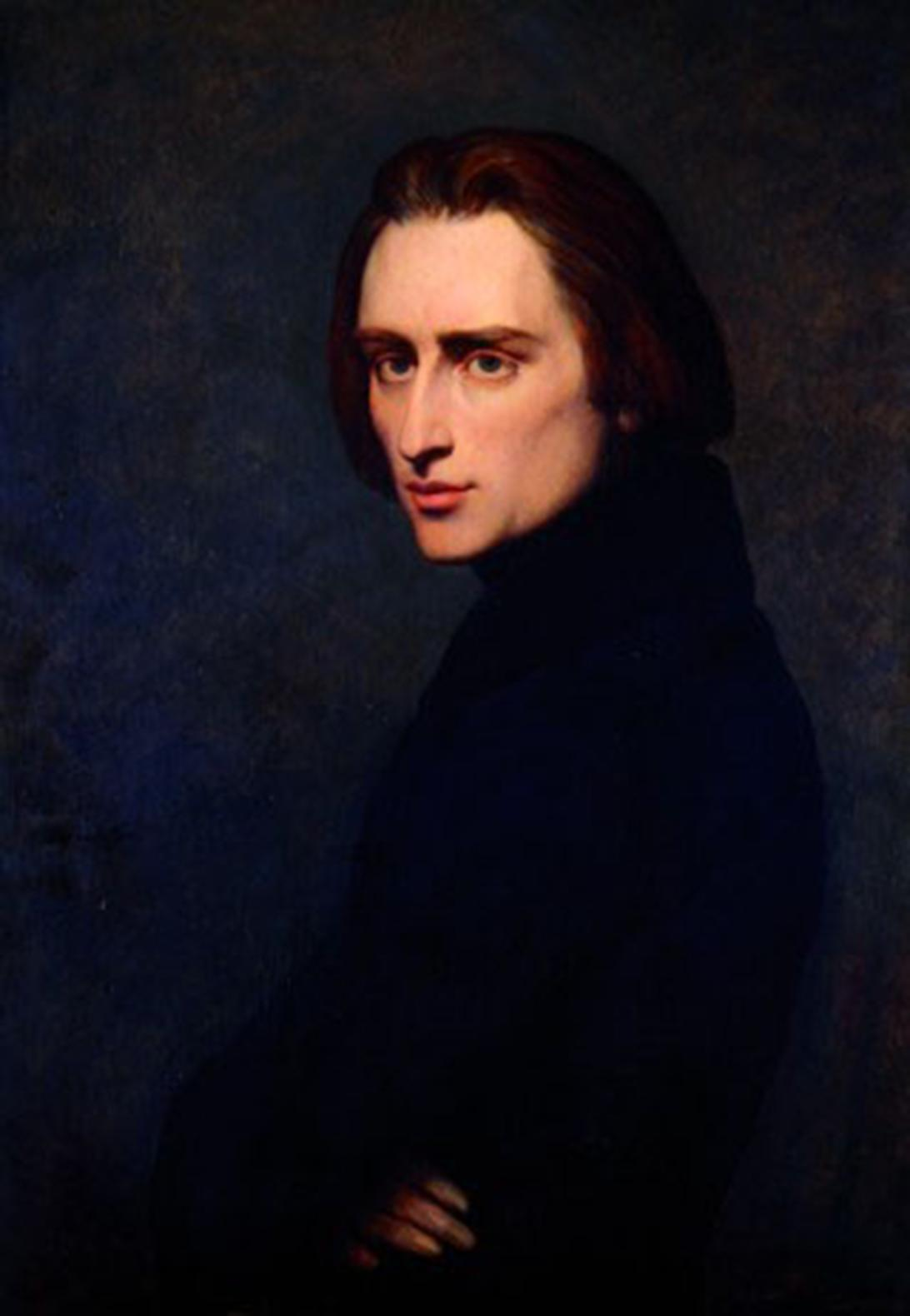
Franz Liszt

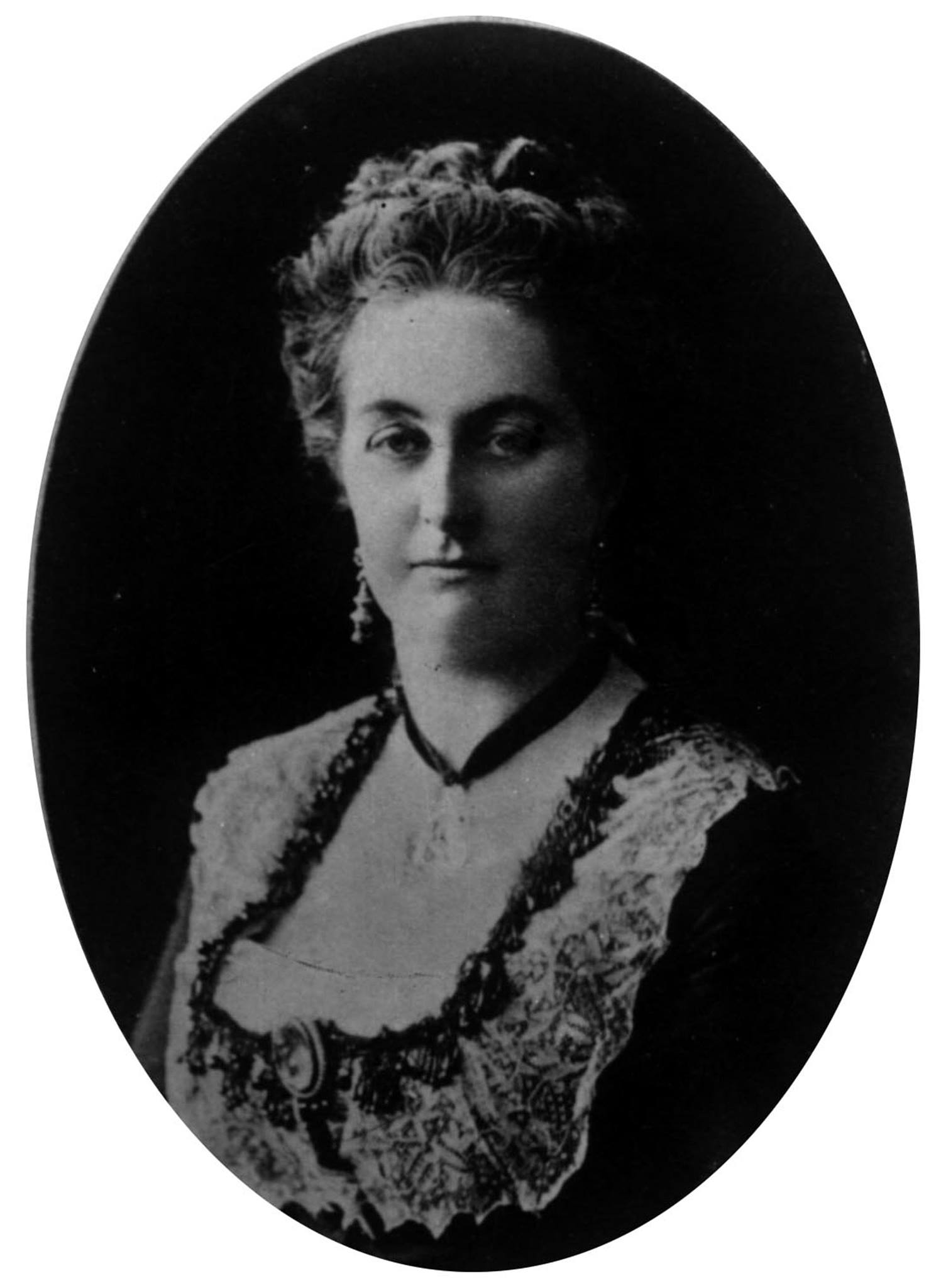
Eliza Lynch

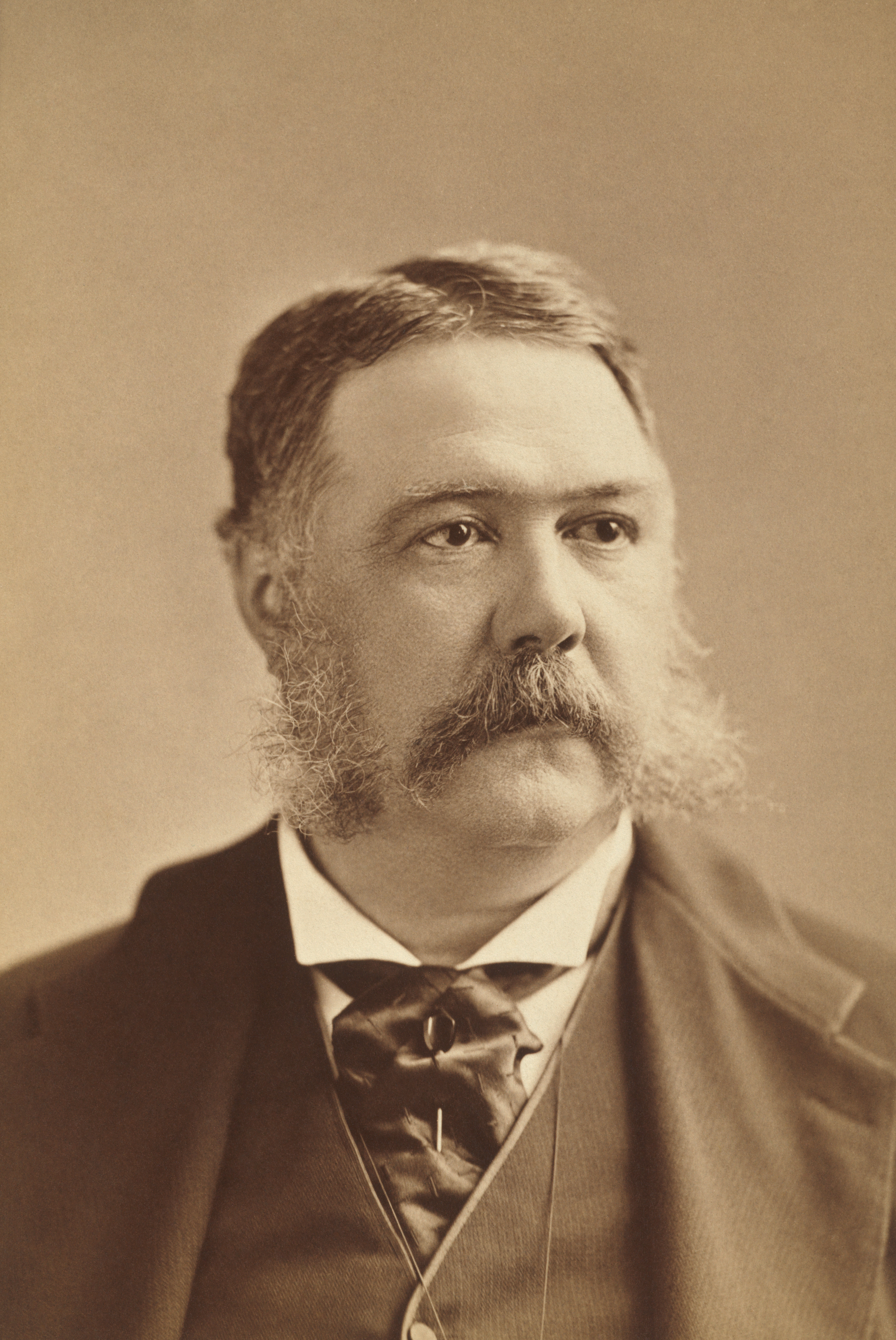
Chester A. Arthur

- July 1 – Otto Wilhelm Hermann von Abich, German geologist (b. 1806)
- July 4
  - Poundmaker, Aboriginal Canadian leader (b. c. 1842)
  - Prince Arisugawa Takahito, Japanese Prince (b. 1813)
- July 16 – Ned Buntline (Edward Zane Carroll Judson Sr.), American publisher, dime novelist and publicist (b. 1821)
- July 25 – Eliza Lynch, First Lady of Paraguay (b. 1833)
- July 31 – Franz Liszt, Hungarian pianist, composer (b. 1811)
- August 4 – Samuel J. Tilden, 25th Governor of New York, 1876 Democratic Party presidential nominee (b. 1814)
- August 9
  - Sir Samuel Ferguson, Northern Irish poet, artist (b. 1810)
  - Bill Smith, Major League Baseball player (b. 1865)
- August 11 – Lydia Koidula, Estonian poet (b. 1843)
- August 16 – Ramakrishna Paramhansa, Indian spiritual figure (b. 1836)
- August 30 – Ferris Jacobs Jr., American politician (b. 1836)
- September 3 – William W. Snow, American politician (b. 1812)
- September 4 – Benjamin F. Cheatham, Confederate general (b. 1820)
- September 14 – Gurdon Saltonstall Hubbard, American land speculator (b. 1802)
- September 25 – Hannah T. King, British-born American writer and pioneer (b. 1808)
- October 6 – Edward William Godwin, English architect (b. 1833)
- October 8 – Austin F. Pike, American politician from New Hampshire (b. 1819)
- October 9 – Jean-Jacques Uhrich, French general (b. 1802)
- October 10 – David Levy Yulee, American politician, US Senator from Florida (b. 1810)
- November 4 – Sir James Martin, 4th Premier of New South Wales (b. 1820)
- November 18 – Chester A. Arthur, 21st President of the United States (b. 1829)
- November 20 – William Bliss Baker, American painter (b. 1859)
- November 21 – Charles Francis Adams Sr., American historical editor, politician and diplomat (b. 1807)
- December 8
  - Isaac Lea, American conchologist, geologist and publisher (b. 1792)
  - William Fraser Tolmie, Scottish-Canadian scientist, politician (b. 1812)
- December 16 – Josef Drásal, the tallest Czech (b. 1841)
- December 26 – John A. Logan, American soldier, political leader (b. 1826)

1887

=== January–June ===
- January 12 – Stafford Northcote, 1st Earl of Iddesleigh, British politician (b. 1818)
- February 19 – Eduard Douwes Dekker, Dutch writer (b. 1820)
- February 25 – Jesse W. Fell, American businessman and landowner (b. 1808)
- February 26 – Anandi Gopal Joshi, first Indian woman doctor (b. 1865)
- February 27 – Alexander Borodin, Russian composer (b. 1833)
- March 4 – Catherine Huggins, British actor, singer, director and manager (b. 1821)
- March 8 – Henry Ward Beecher, American clergyman, reformer (b. 1813)
- March 24
  - Jean-Joseph Farre, French general and statesman (b. 1816)
  - Justin Holland, American musician, civil rights activist (b. 1819)
  - Ivan Kramskoi, Russian painter (b. 1837)
- March 28 – Ditlev Gothard Monrad, Danish politician (b. 1811)
- April 10 – John T. Raymond, American actor (b. 1836)
- April 19 – Henry Hotze, Swiss-American Confederate propagandist (b. 1833)
- April 23 – John Ceiriog Hughes, Welsh poet (b. 1832)
- May 7 – C. F. W. Walther, German-American theologian (b. 1811)
- May 8 – Aleksandr Ulyanov, Russian revolutionary, brother of V. I. Lenin (b. 1866)
- May 14 – Lysander Spooner, American philosopher and abolitionist (b. 1808)
- June 4 – William A. Wheeler, 19th Vice President of the United States (b. 1819)
- June 10 – Richard Lindon, British inventor of the rugby ball, the India-rubber inflatable bladder and the brass hand pump for the same (b. 1816)

=== July–December ===
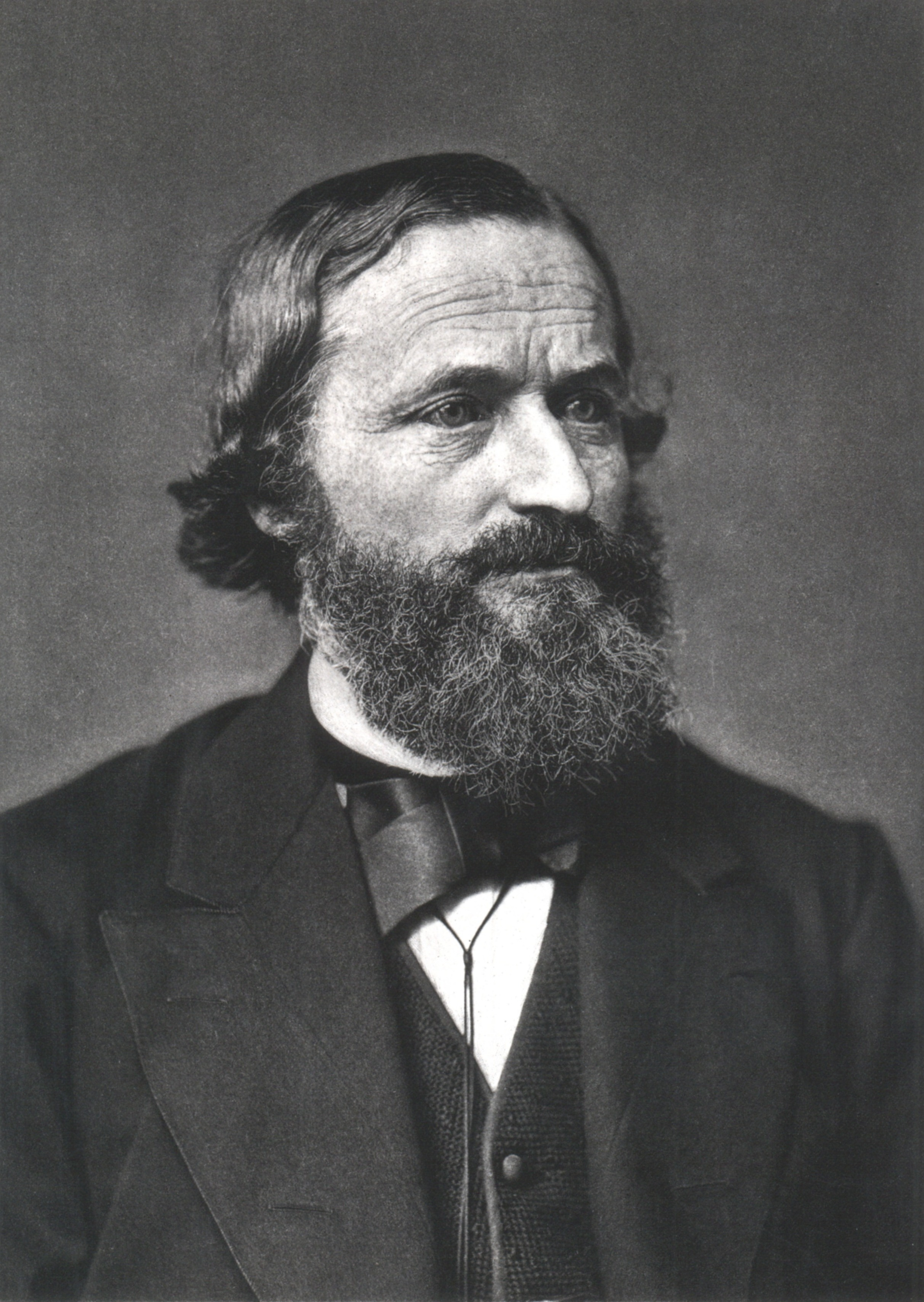
Gustav Kirchhoff

- July 8 – John Wright Oakes, English landscape painter (b. 1820)
- July 17 – Dorothea Dix, American social activist (b. 1802)
- July 25 – John Taylor, American religious leader (b. 1808)
- August 8 – Alexander William Doniphan, American lawyer, soldier (b. 1808)
- August 16
  - Webster Paulson, English civil engineer (b. 1837)
  - Sir Julius von Haast, German-born New Zealand geologist (b. 1822)
- August 19
  - Alvan Clark, American telescope manufacturer (b. 1804)
  - Spencer Fullerton Baird, American naturalist and museum curator (b. 1823)
- August 20 – Jules Laforgue, French poet (b. 1860)
- September 12 – August von Werder, Prussian general (b. 1808)
- October 12 – Dinah Craik, English novelist and poet (b. 1826)
- October 17 – Gustav Kirchhoff, German physicist (b. 1824)
- October 21 – Bernard Jauréguiberry, French admiral, statesman (b. 1815)
- October 26 – Hugo von Kirchbach, Prussian general (b. 1809)
- October 31 – Sir George Macfarren, British composer and musicologist (b. 1813)
- November 2
  - Jenny Lind, Swedish soprano (b. 1820)
  - Alfred Domett, 4th Premier of New Zealand (b. 1811)
- November 8 – Doc Holliday, American gambler, gunfighter (b. 1851)
- November 19 – Emma Lazarus, American poet (b. 1859)
- November 28 – Gustav Fechner, German experimental psychologist (b. 1801)
- December 3 – Albertus Jacobus Duymaer van Twist, Governor-General of the Dutch East Indies (b. 1809)
- December 5 – Richard Lyons, 1st Viscount Lyons, British diplomat (b. 1817)
- December 14 – William Garrow Lettsom, British diplomat, mineralogist and spectroscopist (b. 1805)
- December 23 – Adolphus Frederick Alexander Woodford, British parson (b. 1821)

=== Date unknown ===
- Antoinette Nording, Swedish perfume entrepreneur (b. 1814)

1888

=== January–March ===
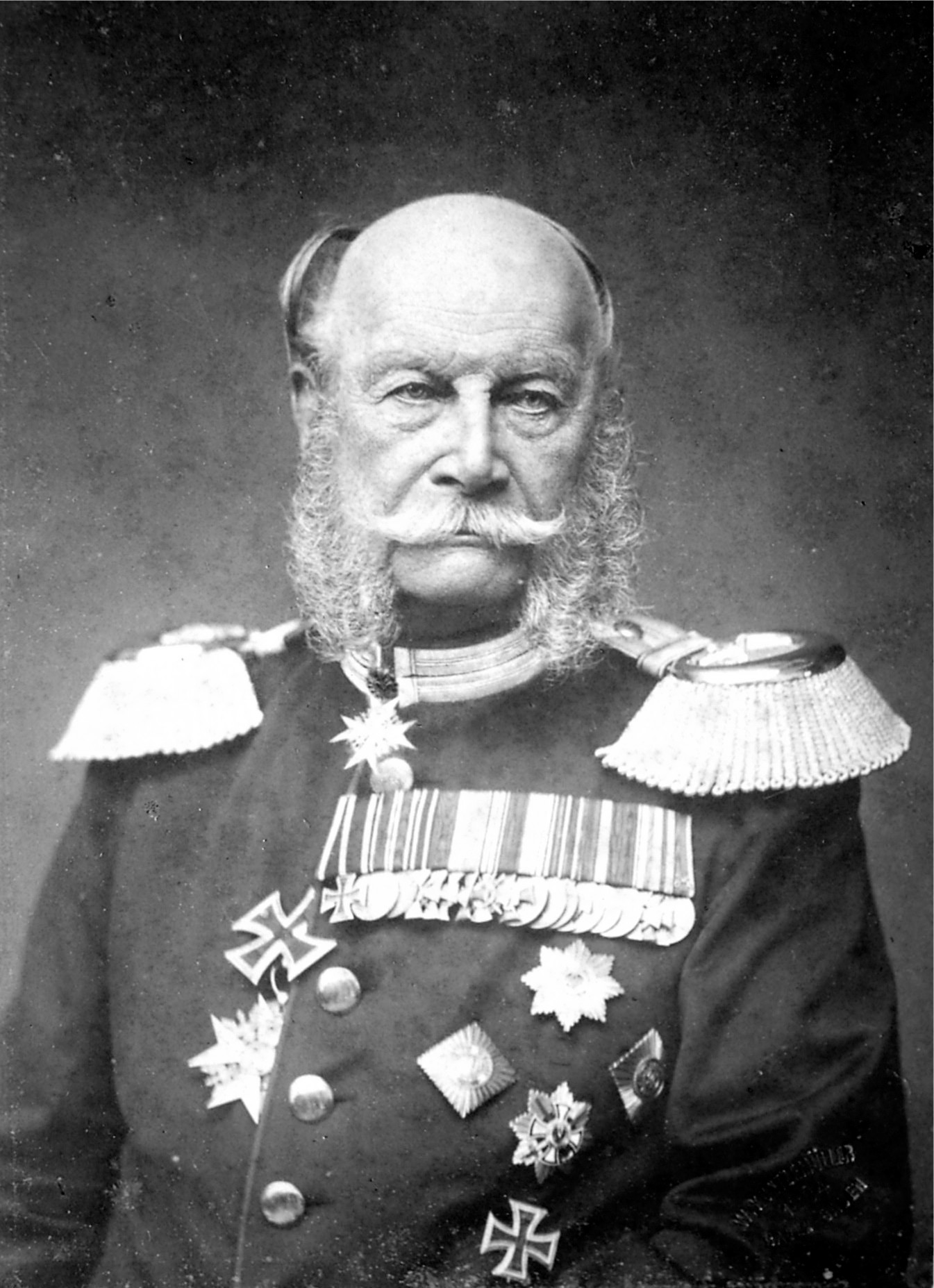
Wilhelm I

- January 7 – Golam Ali Chowdhury, Bengali landlord and philanthropist (b. 1824)
- January 19 – Anton de Bary, German biologist (b. 1831)
- January 20 – William Pitt Ballinger, Texas lawyer, southern statesman (b. 1825)
- January 29 – Edward Lear, British artist, writer (b. 1812)
- January 31 – John Bosco, Italian priest, youth worker, educator and founder of the Salesian Society (b. 1815)
- February 3 – Sir Henry Maine, British jurist (b. 1822)
- February 5 – Anton Mauve, Dutch painter (b. 1838)
- February 9 – Augusto Riboty, Italian admiral and politician (b. 1816)
- February 22 – Anna Kingsford, British women's rights activist (b. 1846)
- February 24 – Seth Kinman, American hunter, settler (b. 1815)
- March 6
  - Louisa May Alcott, American novelist (b. 1832)
  - Josif Pančić, Serbian botanist (b. 1814)
- March 9 – Wilhelm I, German Emperor, King of Prussia (b. 1797)
- March 12 – Henry Bergh, founder of the American Society for the Prevention of Cruelty to Animals (b. 1813)
- March 16 – Hippolyte Carnot, French statesman (b. 1801)
- March 23 – Morrison Waite, Chief Justice of the United States (b. 1816)
- March 27 – Francesco Faà di Bruno, Italian mathematician (b. 1825)
- March 29 – Charles-Valentin Alkan, French composer, pianist (b. 1813)

=== April–June ===
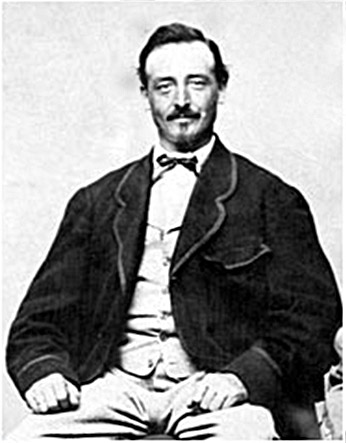
Frederick Miller

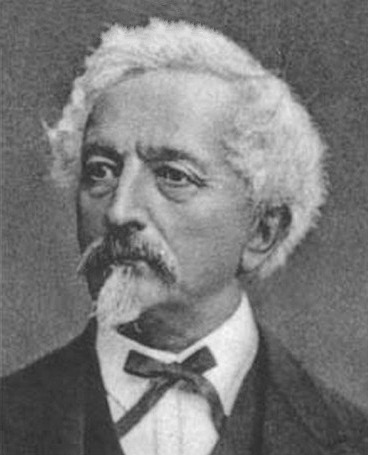
Ascanio Sobrero

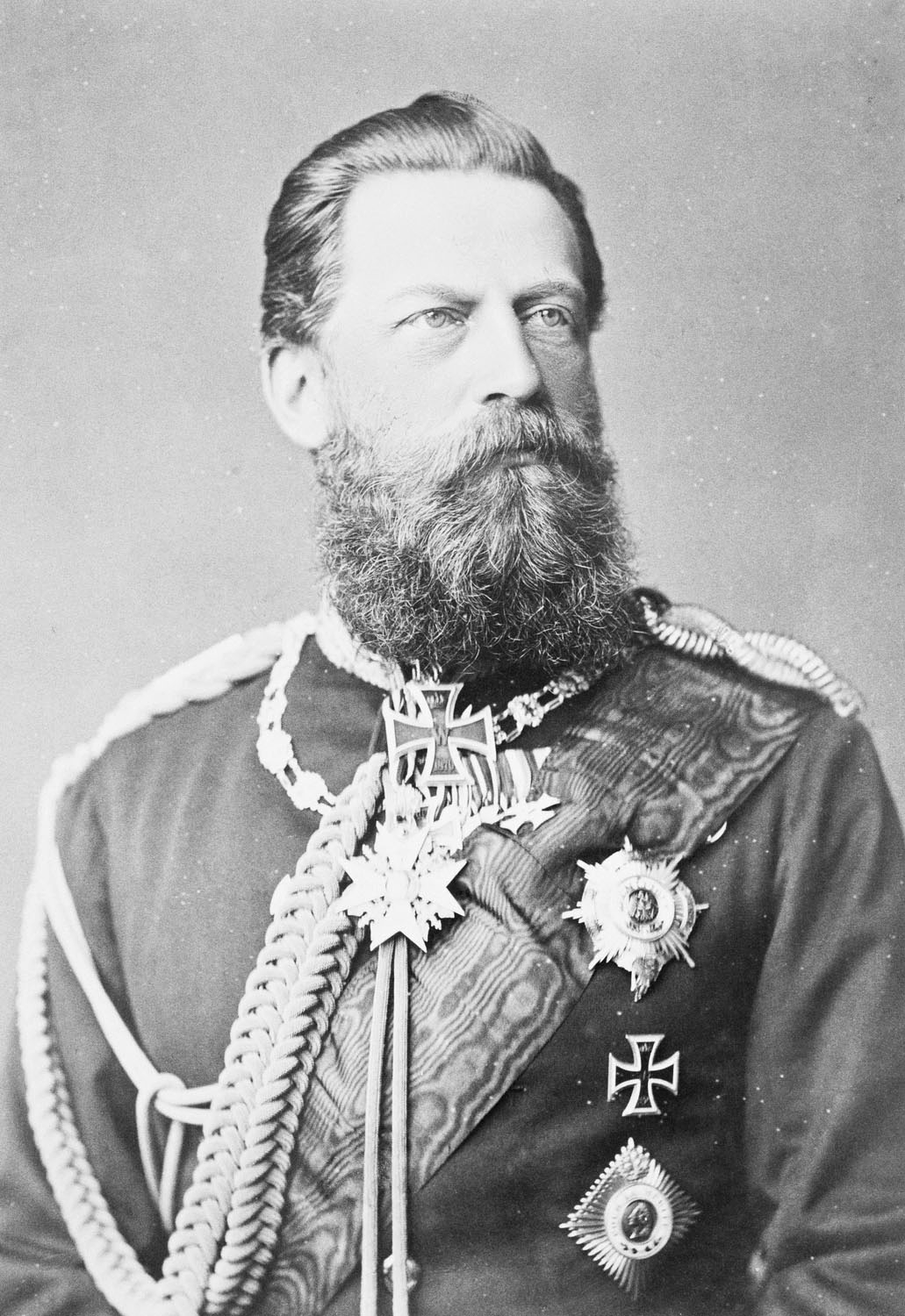
Frederick III

- April 4 – Emma Elizabeth Smith, Whitechapel Murders victim (b. 1843)
- April 14 – Emil Czyrniański, Polish chemist (b. 1824)
- April 15 – Matthew Arnold, English poet (b. 1822)
- April 17 – Ephraim George Squier, American archaeologist, newspaper editor (b. 1821)
- April 19 – Thomas Russell Crampton, English engineer (b. 1816)
- May 6 – Abraham Joseph Ash, American rabbi (b. c. 1813)
- May 11 – Frederick Miller, German-born American brewer and businessman (b. 1824)
- May 15 – Edwin Hamilton Davis, American archaeologist, physician (b. 1811)
- May 19 – Julius Rockwell, United States politician (b. 1805)
- May 26 – Ascanio Sobrero, Italian chemist (b. 1812)
- June 7 – Edmond Le Bœuf, French general, Marshal of France (b. 1809)
- June 8 – Sir Duncan Cameron, British army general (b. 1808)
- June 15 – Frederick III, German Emperor, King of Prussia (b. 1831)
- June 23 – Edmund Gurney, British psychologist (b. 1847)

=== July–September ===
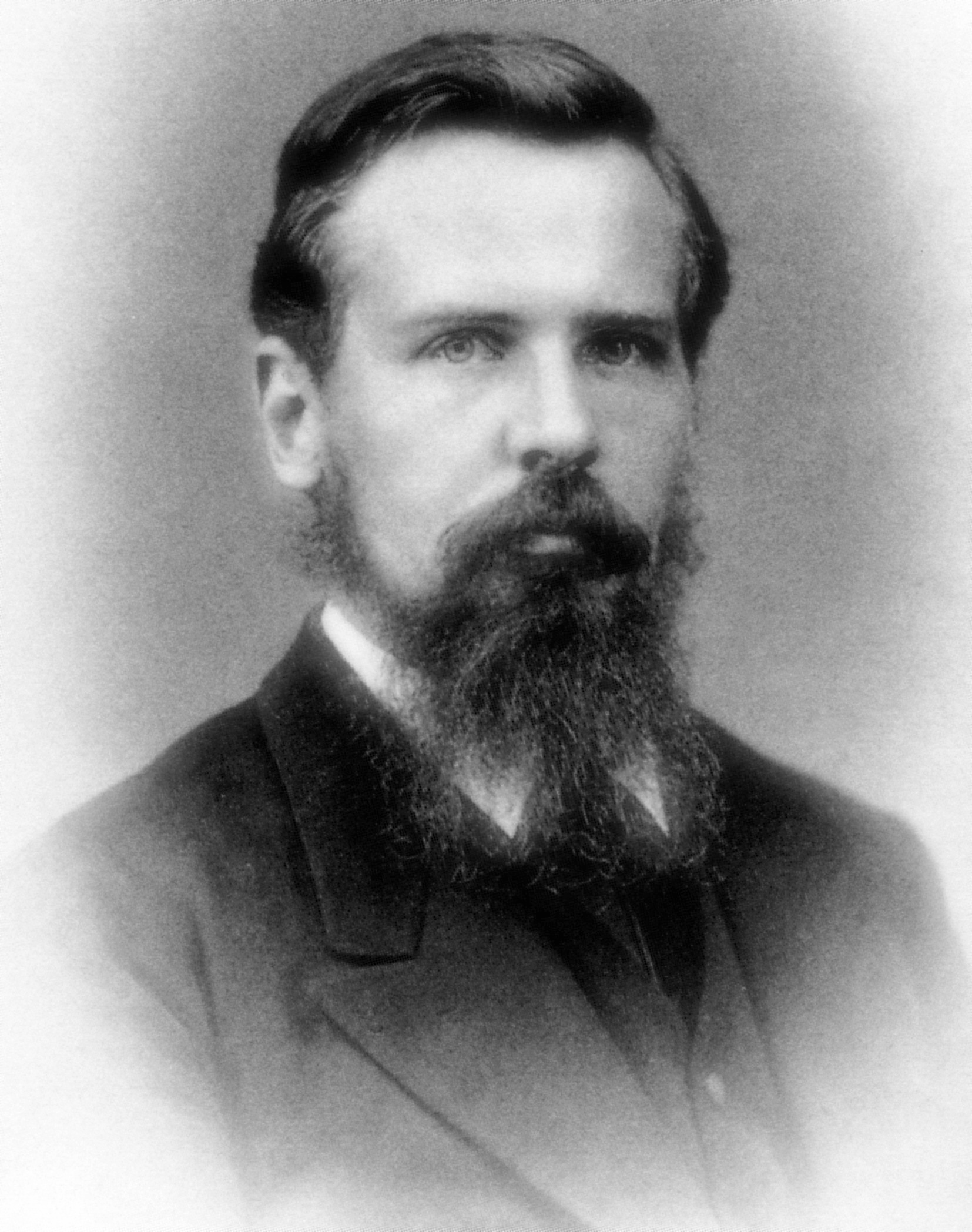
Paul Langerhans

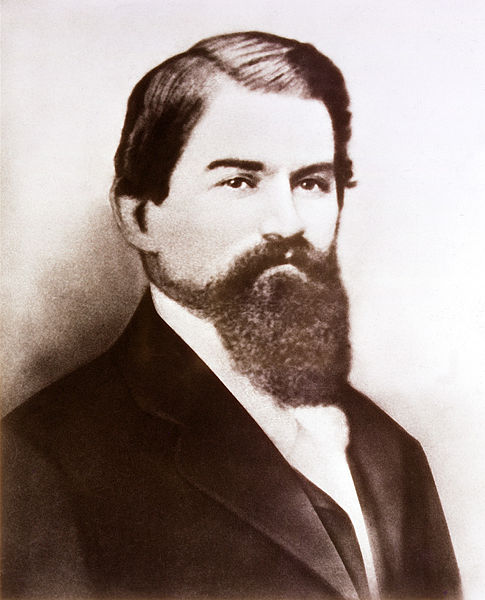
John Pemberton

- July 1 – Maiden of Ludmir, Jewish religious leader (b. 1805)
- July 4 – Theodor Storm, German writer (b. 1817)
- July 9 – Jan Brand, 4th president of the Orange Free State (b. 1823)
- July 20 – Paul Langerhans, German pathologist, biologist (b. 1847)
- August 5 – Philip Sheridan, American general (b. 1831)
- August 7 –
  - Richard Clarke, Canadian politician, Ontario MPP
  - Martha Tabram, possible first victim of Jack the Ripper (b. 1849)
- August 9 – Charles Cros, French poet (b. 1842)
- August 16 – John Pemberton, American pharmacist, founder of Coca-Cola (b. 1831)
- August 20 – Henry Richard, Welsh peace campaigner (b. 1812)
- August 23 – Philip Henry Gosse, British scientist (b. 1810)
- August 24 – Rudolf Clausius, German physicist, contributor to thermodynamics (b. 1822)
- August 31 – Mary Ann Nichols, generally considered the first victim of Jack the Ripper (b. 1845)
- September 6 – John Lester Wallack, American theater impresario (b. 1820)
- September 8 – Annie Chapman, victim of Jack the Ripper (b. 1841)
- September 11 – Domingo Faustino Sarmiento, Argentine politician, writer, and father of education (b. 1811)
- September 23 – François Achille Bazaine, French general (b. 1811)
- September 24 – Karl von Prantl, German philosopher (b. 1820)
- September 30
  - Catherine Eddowes, victim of Jack the Ripper (b. 1842)
  - Elizabeth Stride, victim of Jack the Ripper (b. 1843)

=== October–December ===
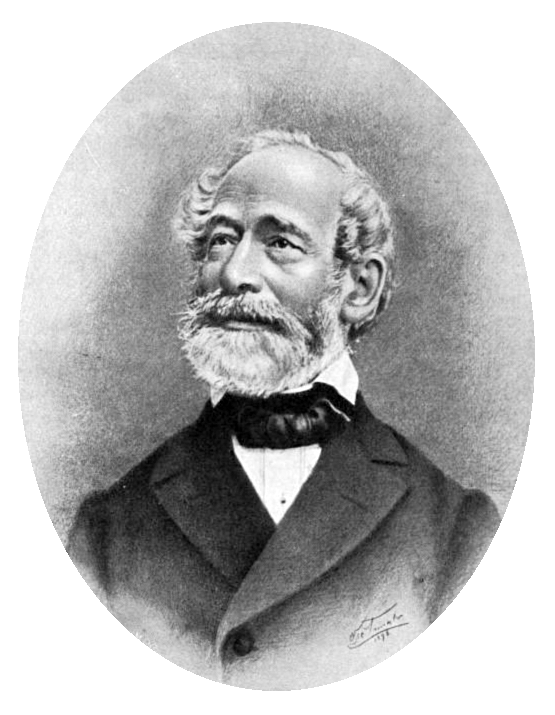
Carl Zeiss

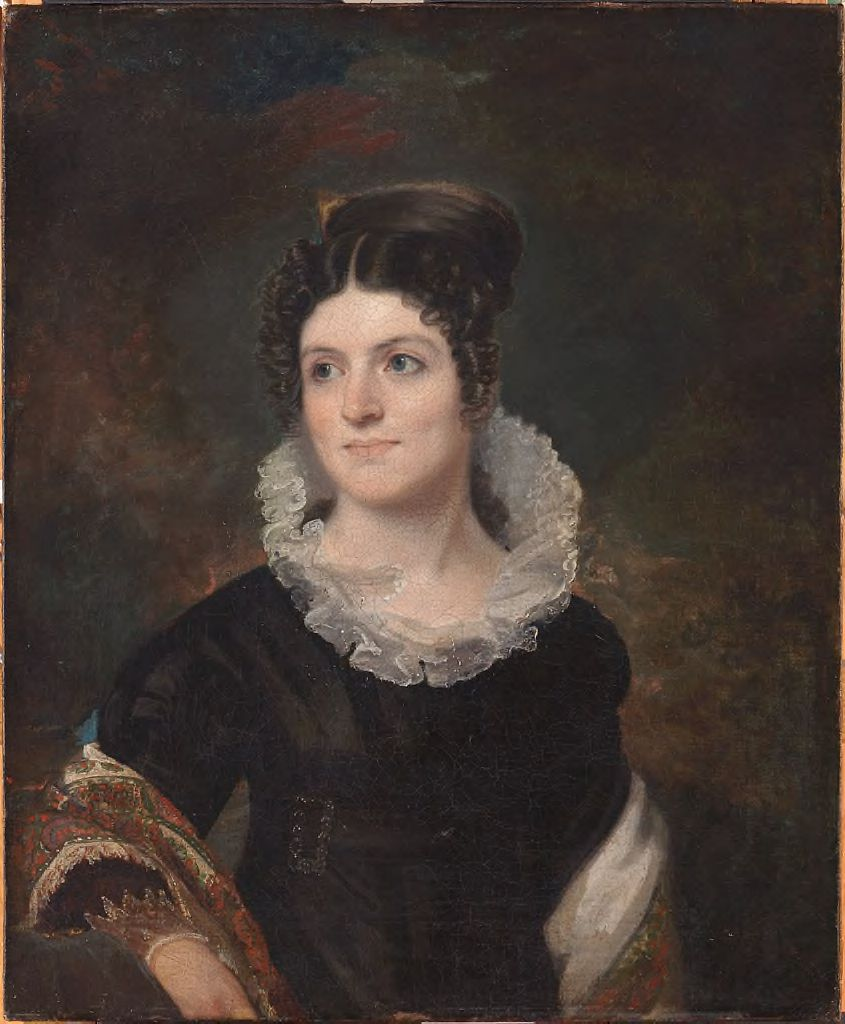
Caroline Howard Gilman

- October 16
  - Horatio Spafford, American author of the hymn It Is Well With My Soul (b. 1828)
  - John Wentworth, Mayor of Chicago (b. 1815)
- October 26 – William Thomas Hamilton, American politician (b. 1820)
- November 1 – Nikolay Przhevalsky, Russian explorer (b. 1839)
- November 9 – Mary Jane Kelly, generally considered the fifth and final victim of Jack the Ripper (b. 1863)
- November 10 – George Bingham, 3rd Earl of Lucan, British army officer and aristocrat (b. 1800)
- November 11 – Pedro Ñancúpel, Chilean pirate active in the fjords and channels of Patagonia. He was executed.
- November 13 – José María Díaz, Spanish romanticist playwright and journalist (b. 1813)
- November 17 – Dora d'Istria, Romanian/Albanian writer and nationalist (b. 1828)
- November 24 – Cicero Price, American commodore (b. 1805)
- December 2 – Namık Kemal, Turkish patriotic poet, social reformer (b. 1840)
- December 3 – Carl Zeiss, German optician, founder of Carl Zeiss AG (b. 1816)
- December 10 – William E. Le Roy, American admiral (b. 1818)
- December 20 – Rose Mylett, Whitechapel murders victim (b. 1859)
- December 24 – Mikhail Loris-Melikov, Russian statesman, general (b. 1826)
- December 31
  - Samson Raphael Hirsch, German rabbi (b. 1808)
  - John Westcott, American surveyor and politician (b. 1807)

=== Date unknown ===
- Caroline Howard Gilman, American author (b. 1794)

1889

=== January–June ===
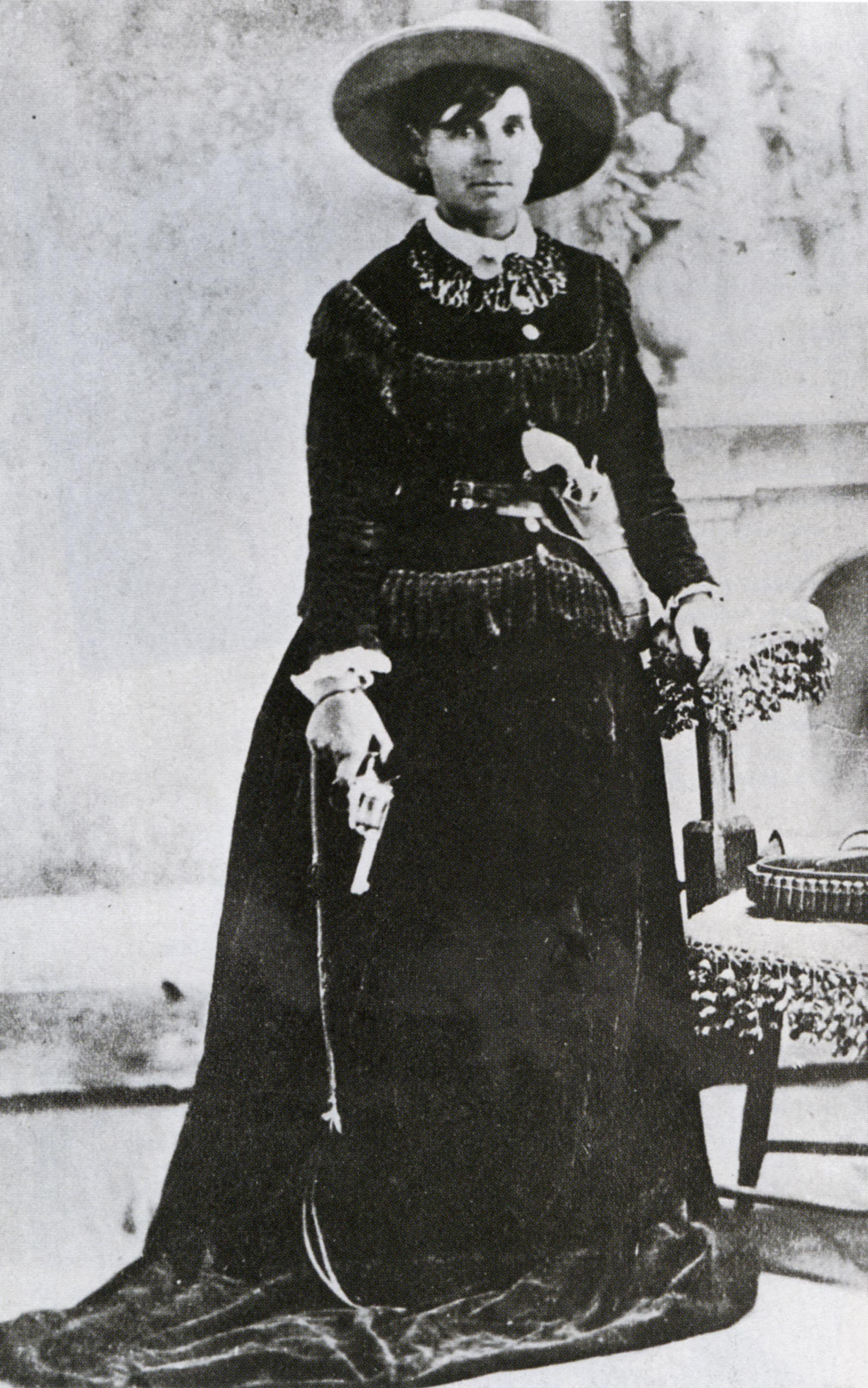
Belle Starr

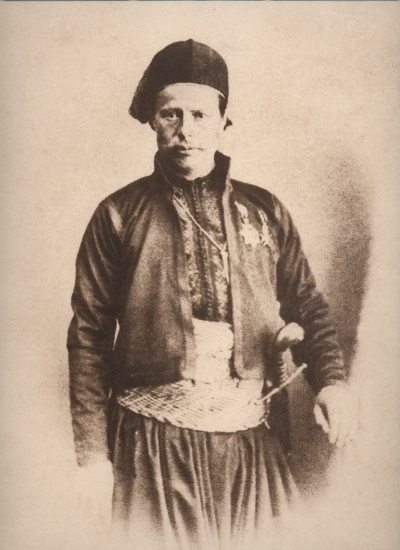
Youssef Bey Karam

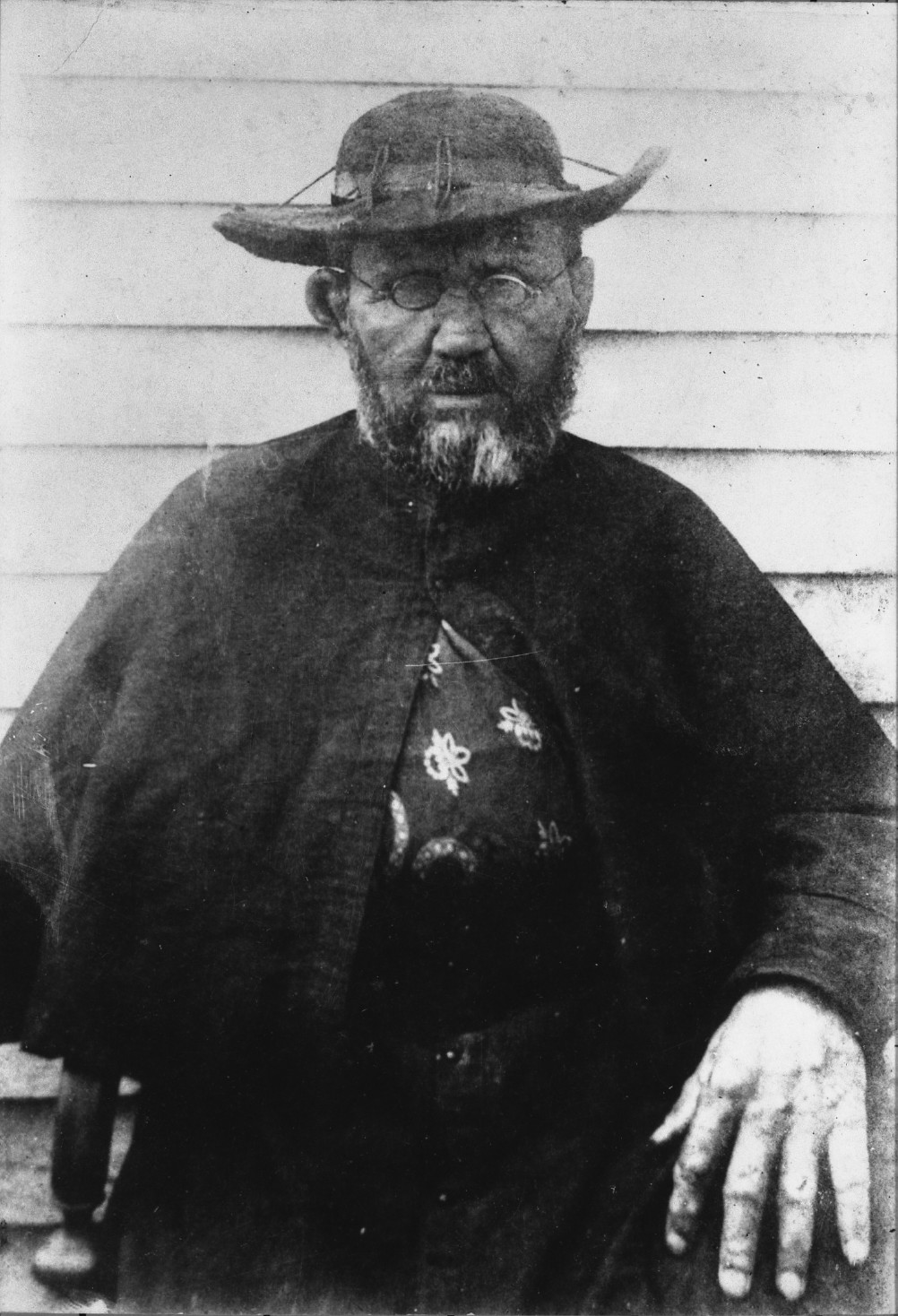
Father Damien

- January 13 – Solomon Bundy, American politician (b. 1823)
- January 22 – Carlo Pellegrini, Italian-born caricaturist (b. 1839)
- January 30 – Mayerling incident (suicide)
  - Rudolf, Crown Prince of Austria (b. 1858)
  - Baroness Mary Vetsera (b. 1871)
- February 3 – Belle Starr, American outlaw (murdered) (b. 1848)
- February 13 – João Maurício Vanderlei, Baron of Cotegipe, Brazilian magistrate and politician (b. 1815)
- March 5 – Mary Louise Booth, American editor-in-chief of Harper's Bazaar (b. 1831)
- March 8 – John Ericsson, Swedish inventor, engineer (b. 1803)
- March 9 – Emperor Yohannes IV of Ethiopia (b. 1837)
- March 13 – Felice Varesi, French-born Italian baritone (b. 1813)
- March 22 – Stanley Matthews, American judge and politician (b. 1824)
- March 24 – The Leatherman, possibly French-Canadian vagabond in the U.S. (b. c. 1839)
- March 28 – Ram Singh, Raja of Bundi. (b. 1811)
- April 6 – Princess Augusta of Hesse-Kassel (b. 1797)
- April 7 – Youssef Bey Karam, Lebanese nationalist leader (b. 1823)
- April 9 – Michel Eugène Chevreul, French chemist (b. 1786)
- April 12 – Robert Dunsmuir, Scottish-born Canadian industrialist and politician (b. 1825)
- April 15 – Father Damien, Belgian Roman Catholic priest, missionary to Hawaiians with leprosy, and saint (b. 1840)
- April 21 – Sebastián Lerdo de Tejada, Mexican jurist, 27th President of Mexico (b. 1823)
- April 25 – Mary Dominis, American settler of Hawaii (b. 1803)
- May 9 – William S. Harney, U.S. Army general (b. 1800)
- May 10 – Mikhail Saltykov-Shchedrin, Russian satirist (b. 1826)
- May 14 – Volney E. Howard, American politician (b. 1809)
- May 28 – Madeleine Vinton Dahlgren, American translator and anti-suffragist (b. 1825)
- June 8 – Gerard Manley Hopkins, English poet (b. 1844)
- June 10 – Abraham Hochmuth, Hungarian rabbi (b. 1816)
- June 15 – Mihai Eminescu, Romanian poet (b. 1850)
- June 25 – Lucy Webb Hayes, First Lady of the United States (b. 1831)

=== July–December ===
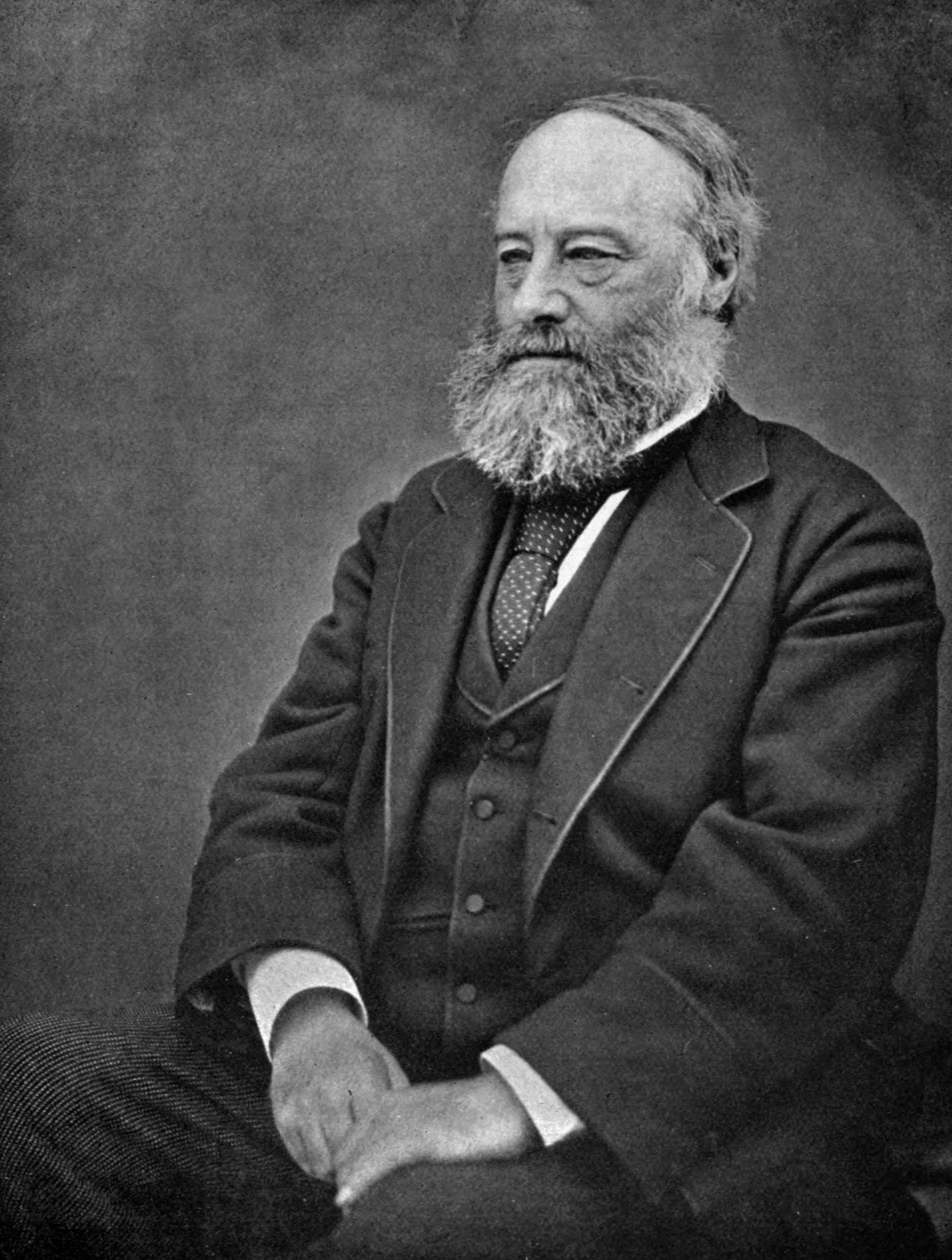
James Prescott Joule

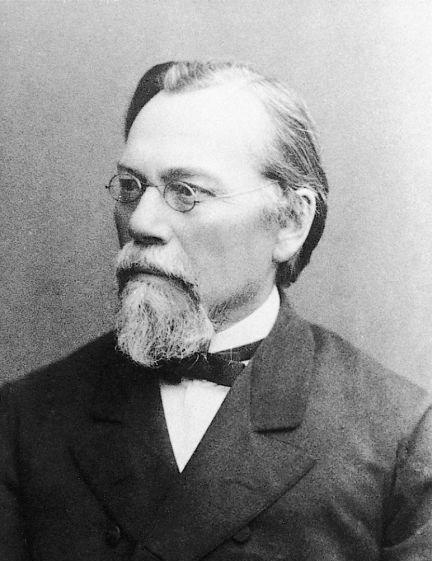
August Ahlqvist

- July 4 – Susan Catherine Koerner Wright, mother of the Wright Brothers (b. 1831)
- July 7 – Giovanni Bottesini, Italian conductor, composer and virtuoso double bass player (b. 1821)
- July 10 – Julia Gardiner Tyler, First Lady of the United States (b. 1820)
- August 2 – Eduardo Gutiérrez, Argentinian author (b. 1851)
- August 19 – Auguste Villiers de l'Isle-Adam, French writer (b. 1838)
- September 23 – Wilkie Collins, English novelist (b. 1824)
- September 24 – Charles Leroux, American balloonist, parachutist (b. 1856)
- September 29 – Louis Faidherbe, French general and colonial administrator (b. 1818)
- October 10 – Adolf von Henselt, German pianist and composer (b. 1814)
- October 11 – James Prescott Joule, English physicist (b. 1818)
- October 17
  - Rodrigo Augusto da Silva, Brazilian Senator, author of the Golden Law (b. 1833)
  - John F. Hartranft, Union Army officer, Medal of Honour recipient (b. 1830)
- October 19 – King Luís I of Portugal (b. 1838)
- October 25 – Émile Augier, French dramatist (b. 1820)
- November 16 – Sergei Bobokhov, Russian revolutionary, commits suicide as a protest against the flogging of a woman comrade in Siberia (b. 1858)
- November 18 – William Allingham, Irish author (b. 1824)
- November 20 – August Ahlqvist, Finnish professor, poet, scholar of the Finno-Ugric languages, author and literary critic (b. 1826)
- November 24 – George H. Pendleton, American politician (b. 1825)
- December 6 – Jefferson Davis, President of the Confederate States of America (b. 1808)
- December 12 – Robert Browning, English poet (b. 1812)
- December 20 – George F. Durand, Canadian architect (b. 1850)
- December 28 – Teresa Cristina of the Two Sicilies, Empress consort of Brazil (b. 1822)
- December 29
  - Glele, King of Dahomey (suicide)
  - Priscilla Cooper Tyler, de facto First Lady of the United States (b. 1816)
- December 30 – Sir Henry Yule, Scottish orientalist (b. 1820)
- December 31 – Ion Creangă, Romanian writer (b. 1837 or 1839)

== See also ==
- List of decades, centuries, and millennia
- Victorian era
- Gilded Age
- American frontier

== Sources ==
- Ranade, Sadashiv Bhaskar (1974). Cittapāvana Kauśika Gotrī Āgāśe-Kula-vr̥ttānta [The Agashe Family Genealogy belonging to the Chitpavan Kaushik Gotra] (Kulavruttanta) (in Marathi) (1st ed.). Pune: University of Michigan. LCCN 74903020. OCLC 600048059.
