= Morris (surname) =

- Pronunciation: /ˈmɒrɪs/
- Language: English

Origin
- Languages: Old English, Irish, Welsh, French, Latin
- Derivation: Various

Other names
- Variant forms: Morrice; Maurice

Morris is a surname of various origins, though mostly of English, Irish, Scottish and Welsh origins. In 2014, the surname ranked 39 out of 104,537 in England, and 55 out of 400,980 in the United States.

According to the 1881 UK Census, the vast majority of people with the surname Morris were located in Lancashire (mostly in present day Greater Manchester), England (8723; 2516 per million); with significant concentrations in London, Glamorgan (or Wales as a whole), and the West Midlands. Now more widespread across the UK, a total of 95,101 individuals with this surname were recorded across the country in 2016.

The German language has the equivalent Moritz, Morris can be used as an English translation.

== Origins ==
=== Moors ===
Morris can be derived from the personal name Maurice or Moreis. Meurig is the Welsh equivalent with Morus and Morys Anglicisations of the Welsh form also found. The name is traced through Middle English, Old French and Latin Mauritius 'Moorish, dark, swarthy'; from Maurus 'a Moor'. It was the name of the 3rd century Christian martyr Saint Maurice.

=== Marshes ===
Ó Muiris and, less commonly, de Moiréis in Irish; the Morris surname in Ireland is predominantly of Norman origin. It comes from the Norman "de Mareys", "de Marreis" and Latin "de Marisco", i.e., "of the marsh". It is a common surname in many parts of the south of Ireland, especially in Kilkenny, Tipperary, Offaly, Laois, Cork and Limerick, where it is now anglicised as Morris. A family of the name settled, in 1485, at Galway and became one of the Tribes of Galway. It may also refer to "descendant of Muiris" (sea-choice), a variant of Ó Muireasa. This was the name of a branch of the Uí Fiachrach who were formerly chiefs of a district on the southern shore of Sligo Bay, in the barony of Tireragh. The name would later be adopted by the Morrises outside of Sligo.

== People ==
=== A ===
- Aaron Morris (disambiguation)
- Abigail Morris (arts administrator) (born 1964), British arts administrator
- Abigail Morris (musician), (born 1999), British singer-songwriter
- Adele Morris (born 1963), policy director for Climate and Energy Economics at the Brookings Institution
- Adrian Morris (actor) (1907–1941), American stage and film actor
- Adrian Morris (painter) (1929–2004), English painter
- Aggrey Morris (born 1984), Tanzanian footballer
- Agnes Thomas Morris (1865–1949), American writer and clubwoman
- A. J. Morris (born 1986), American baseball pitcher
- A. J. A. Morris, British historian
- Akeel Morris (born 1992), American baseball pitcher
- Alan Morris (disambiguation)
- Albert Morris (disambiguation)
- Aldon Morris (born 1949), American sociologist
- Alec Morris, New Zealand rugby league footballer
- Alessandro Morris (born 1982), Caymanian cricketer
- Alexander Morris (disambiguation)
- Alfred Morris (disambiguation)
- Alice Vanderbilt Morris (1874–1950), member of the Vanderbilt family, co-founder of the International Auxiliary Language Association
- Allan Morris (disambiguation)
- Allen Morris (disambiguation)
- Alwyn Morris (born 1957), Canadian Olympic sprint kayaker
- Amos Morris (born 1987/1988), Australian country music bush balladeer
- Andrea Morris (born 1983), Canadian actress
- Andrew Morris (disambiguation)
- Anita Morris (1943–1994), American actress, singer and dancer
- Anne Morris (disambiguation)
- Anthony Morris (disambiguation)
- Aric Morris (born 1977), American football safety
- Arthur Morris (disambiguation)
- Ashley Morris (disambiguation)
- Aubrey Morris (1926–2015), British actor
- Audrey Morris (1928–2018), American jazz singer
- Augustus Morris (1820–1895), Australian politician
- Augustus Newbold Morris (1838–1906), American socialite

=== B ===
- Bam Morris (born 1972), American football running back
- Barbara Morris (1918–2009), English art scholar and artist
- Barboura Morris (1932–1975), American actress
- Barney Morris (1915–1962), baseball player in the Negro leagues
- Barry Morris (1935–2001), Australian politician
- Barry S. Morris, CEO of NuoDB
- Basil Morris (1888–1975), Australian general, military administrator of Papua
- Bede Morris (1927–1988), Australian immunologist
- Ben Morris (special effects artist), Best Visual Effects Academy Award winner for The Golden Compass (2007)
- Benjamin Morris (disambiguation)
- Benny Morris (born 1948), Israeli historian
- Bernard Morris (born 1985), American football quarterback
- Bernie Morris (1890–1963), Canadian ice hockey player
- Bert Morris (disambiguation)
- Bevan Morris (born 1949), American psychologist and philosopher, president of Maharishi University of Management
- Bonnie J. Morris (born 1961), American women's studies professor
- Brennan Morris (born 1990), American swimmer
- Brett Morris (born 1986), Australian rugby league footballer
- Brewster Morris (1909–1990), United States Ambassador to Chad
- Brian Morris (disambiguation)
- Bruce Morris, American politician
- Bryn Morris (born 1996), English footballer
- Buckner Stith Morris (1800–1879), Mayor of Chicago (1838–1839)
- Buckshot Morris, American car racer and race car owner
- Burton Morris (born 1964), American pop artist
- Butch Morris (1947–2013), American cornetist, composer and conductor
- Butler Morris, Papua New Guinean rugby league player

=== C ===
- Cadwalader Morris (1741–1795), American merchant and politician
- Cale Morris, (born 1996), American ice hockey goaltender
- Callum Morris (born 1990), English footballer
- Calvary Morris (1798–1871), American politician
- Carey Morris (1882–1968), Welsh painter, illustrator, author and businessman
- Carl Morris (disambiguation)
- Carol Morris (born 1936), American actress, Miss Universe 1956
- Caroline Morris (born 1974), British voice actress
- Carolyn Morris (1925–1996), American baseball pitcher
- Carlton Morris (born 1995), English footballer
- Cassandra Lee Morris (born 1982), American voice actress
- Catherine Morris, British figure skater
- Cavour Morris (born 1932), Barbadian sports shooter
- Cedric Morris (1889–1982), British artist, art teacher and plantsman
- Cecil Morris (1933–2001), American football coach and player
- Chad Morris (born 1968), American football coach
- Charles Morris (disambiguation)
- Charlotte P. Morris, American academic administrator
- Chester Morris (1901–1970), American actor
- Chris Morris (disambiguation)
- Christiana Morris (c.1804–1886), Mi'kmaq quillworker
- Christine Wigfall Morris (1922–2014), American librarian
- Christie Morris (1882–1971), American cricketer
- Clara Morris (1849–1925), American actress
- Claud Morris (1920–2000), British newspaper owner
- Claude F. Morris (1869–1957), a justice of the Montana Supreme Court
- Clayton Morris (born 1976), American real estate investor and television host
- Clifford Morris (1942–2022), British politician
- Cody Morris (born 1996), American baseball player
- Colin Morris (disambiguation)
- Corbyn Morris (1710–1779), English commissioner of the customs and economic writer
- Cory Morris (born 1978), American serial killer and necrophile
- Craig Morris (born 1968), American orchestral trumpeter
- Cynthia Taft Morris (1928–2013), American economist

=== D ===
- Dai Morris (born 1941), Welsh rugby union footballer
- Dale Morris (born 1982), Australian rules footballer
- Daniel Morris (1812–1889), American politician
- Daniel Morris (botanist) (1844–1933), British administrator, horticulturist and botanist
- Daniel Morris, member of the band Band of Oz (2005–present)
- Danny Morris (1946–2023), American baseball pitcher
- Danny Morris (music producer), American 21st century songwriter and record producer
- Darick Kobie Morris (born 1995), Croatian footballer
- Darius Morris (born 1991), American basketball player
- Darren Morris (born 1974), Wales rugby union player
- Darrin Morris (1966–2000), American super middleweight boxer
- Darryl Morris (disambiguation)
- David Morris (disambiguation)
- Dennis Morris (disambiguation)
- Dennit Morris (1936–2014), American football linebacker
- Derek Morris (disambiguation)
- Des Morris (born 1948), Australian rugby league footballer, coach and administrator
- Desmond Morris (1928–2026), British ethologist, zoologist and author
- Desmond Morris (athlete) (1961–1989), Jamaican high jumper
- Devon Morris (born 1961), Jamaican sprinter
- Dewi Morris (born 1964), English rugby union footballer
- Dewi "Pws" Morris (1948–2024), Welsh actor and musician
- Dick Morris (born 1948), American political author, newspaper columnist and commentator
- Dontae Morris (born 1985), American convicted serial killer sentenced to the death penalty
- Dorothy Morris (1922–2011), American actress
- Doug Morris (born 1938), chairman and CEO of the Universal Music Group (1995–2011) and Sony Music Entertainment (2011–2017)
- Douglas Morris (1908–1990), Royal Air Force air marshal
- Douglas J. Morris (1861–1928), American lawyer, politician and judge
- Doyt Morris (1916–1984), American baseball outfielder

=== E ===
- Earl H. Morris, American archeologist
- Earl Morris (basketball coach) (born 1933), American high school basketball coach
- Earle Morris (curler) (born 1945), Canadian curler and coach
- Earle Morris Jr. (1928–2011), American politician, Lieutenant-Governor of South Carolina (1971–1975)
- Edgar Morris (1914–2002), Rhodesian cricket player
- Edita Morris (1902–1988), Swedish-American writer
- Edith Emily Morris (1895–1965), New Zealand jewellery designer and silversmith
- Edmund Morris (disambiguation)
- Ed or Edward Morris (disambiguation)
- Edwin Morris (disambiguation)
- Effie Morris (1921–2009), American librarian and educator
- Elfed Morris (1942–2013), Welsh footballer
- Elida Morris (1886–1977), American vaudeville singer, comedian and actress
- Eliot Morris (born 1977), American singer, songwriter and musician
- Eliza F. Morris (1821–1874), English hymnwriter
- Elisabeth or Elizabeth Morris (disambiguation)
- Elliot Morris (rugby league) (born 1996), English rugby league footballer
- Elliott Morris (disambiguation)
- Elwyn Morris (1921–2000), Canadian ice hockey player
- Eric Morris (disambiguation)
- Ernest Morris (1913–1987), British film director
- Ernest William Morris (1866–1937), English chemist, secretary and house governor of the London Hospital (1903–1930)
- Errol Morris (born 1948), American documentary film director
- Estelle Morris (born 1952), British politician and member of the House of Lords
- Esther Morris Leidolf, medical sociologist, and intersex activist
- Eva Morris (1885–2000), British supercentenarian, oldest recognised person in the world (1999–2000)
- Evan Morris (lobbyist) (1977–2015), American lobbyist
- Evelyn Morris, Australian musician

=== F ===
- Finlay Morris (1945–1967), Scottish professional golfer
- Flora Morris (c. 1890–?), British actress
- Floyd Morris (born 1969), President of the Senate of Jamaica (2013–2016)
- Frances Morris (disambiguation)
- Francis Morris (disambiguation)
- Frank Morris (disambiguation)
- Frazer Morris (born 1997), British rugby league player
- Fred Morris (disambiguation)

=== G ===
- Gareth Morris (1920–2007), British flautist
- Gareth A. Morris (born 1954), British chemist
- Garrett Morris (born 1937), American actor and comedian
- Gary Morris (born 1948), American singer and stage actor
- Gavin Morris (born 1998), South African cricketer
- G. Delbert Morris (1909–1987), American politician
- G. Elliott Morris (born 1996), American data journalist
- Genevieve Morris (born 1967), Australian actress
- Geoffrey Morris (disambiguation)
- George Morris (disambiguation)
- Geraint Morris (1941–1997), Welsh film and television director and producer
- Gerald Morris (born 1963), American writer of children's and young adult literature
- Gertrude Maesmore Morris (1872–1952), English-Australian actress
- Gideon Morris (1756–1798), trans-Appalachian pioneer and founder of Morristown, Tennessee
- Gilbert Morris (1929–2016), American Christian author
- Glenn Morris (1912–1974), American Olympic track and field athlete
- Glenn Morris (footballer) (born 1983), English football goalkeeper
- Gouverneur Morris (1752–1816), American statesman and diplomat
- Gouverneur Morris Jr. (1813–1888), American railroad executive
- Gouverneur Morris (novelist) (1876–1953), American author of pulp novels and short stories
- Graeme Morris (cricketer) (born 1963), English cricketer
- Graeme Morris (game designer), British RPG designer
- Grahame Morris (born 1961), British politician
- Greg Morris (disambiguation)
- Grenville Morris (1877–1959), Welsh footballer
- Greta N. Morris, United States Ambassador to the Republic of the Marshall Islands (2003–2006)
- Gwladys Evan Morris (1879–1957), Welsh stage actress and writer

=== H ===
- Hal Morris (born 1965), American baseball player
- Hamilton Morris (born 1987), American writer, documentarian and psychoactive drug researcher
- Hampton Morris (born 2004), American weightlifter
- Hannah Morris, American anthropologist, member of the Underground Astronauts group
- Haydn Morris (1928–2021), British rugby union footballer
- Harold Morris (disambiguation)
- Harry Morris (disambiguation)
- Harvey R. Morris (1807–1886), New York politician
- Haviland Morris (born 1959), American actress
- Heather Morris (born 1987), American actor
- Henry Morris (disambiguation)
- Herbert Morris (disambiguation)
- H. G. Morris, acting Commander of the Ceylon Volunteers Force (1902)
- Hilda Grossman Morris (1911–1991), American sculptor
- Holly Morris (disambiguation)
- Howard Morris (1919–2005), American actor, voice actor and director
- Howard Morris (biochemist), British biochemist
- Hugh Morris (disambiguation)
- Hunter Morris (born 1988), American baseball first baseman

=== I ===
- Iain Morris (born 1973), English screenwriter, creator of the British sitcom The Inbetweeners
- Ian Morris (disambiguation)
- Ieuan Morris, British art photographer
- Iona Morris (born 1957), American actress
- Ira Nelson Morris (1883–1942), American diplomat, Minister to Sweden (1914–1923)
- Irvin Morris (born 1958), Navajo Nation author
- Isaac N. Morris (1812–1879), American politician
- Isaiah Morris (born 1969), American basketball player
- Ishan Morris, Canadian actor and singer
- Islwyn Morris (1920–2011), Welsh-speaking actor and director
- Ivan Morris (1925–1976), British author and teacher in the field of Japanese studies

=== J ===
- Jack Morris (disambiguation)
- Jackie Morris (born 1961), British writer and illustrator
- Jake Morris (hurler), Irish hurler
- Jake Morris (soccer) (born 1999), American soccer player
- Jamel Morris (born 1992), American basketball player
- James Morris (disambiguation)
- Jan Morris (1926–2020), Welsh historian, author and travel writer
- Jane Morris (1839–1914), English artists' model, and embroiderer
- Jane Alice Morris (1861–1935), British embroiderer
- Janet Morris (1946–2024), American author
- Jason Morris (born 1967), American Olympic judoka
- Jasper Morris, British wine expert
- Jay Morris (born 1958), American, businessman, attorney and politician
- Jay Hunter Morris (born 1963), American operatic tenor
- Jaylen Morris (born 1995), American basketball player
- J. Clyde Morris (1909–1987), American civil servant, only city manager of the City of Warwick, Virginia
- Jeff Morris (disambiguation)
- Jené Morris (born 1987), American basketball player
- Jenny Morris (disambiguation)
- Jeremiah Morris (1929–2006), American actor, television and theater director
- Jeremy Morris (born 1960), British historian and Anglican priest
- Jerry Morris (1910–2009), British epidemiologist and cardiologist
- Jessica Morris, American actress
- Jill Morris, British Ambassador to Italy (2016–2022)
- Jim Morris (disambiguation)
- J. Madison Wright Morris (1984–2006), American actress
- Joan Morris (born 1943), American mezzo-soprano
- Jody Morris, English football player
- Joe Morris (disambiguation)
- Joel Morris, British comedy writer
- John Morris (disambiguation)
- Johnny Morris (disambiguation)
- Jonathan Morris (disambiguation)
- Jontavius Morris (born 1993), American football defensive tackle and coach
- Jordan Morris (disambiguation)
- Joseph Morris (disambiguation)
- Josh Morris (disambiguation)
- Joy Morris (born 1970), Canadian mathematician
- Judy Morris (born 1947), Australian actress, film director and screenwriter
- Julia Morris (born 1968), Australian comedian, actress, writer, television presenter and producer
- Julia Morris (filmmaker), Australian filmmaker
- Julian Morris (born 1983), English-American actor
- Julian Morris (economist), British and American economist, Vice President of Research at Reason Foundation
- Julianne Morris (born 1968), American actress
- Juliet Morris (born 1965), British television presenter
- Julius Morris (born 1994), Montserratian sprinter

=== K ===
- Kade Morris (born 2002), American baseball player
- Karen Joy Morris (born 1970), also known as Karen Mok, Hong Kong actor and singer-songwriter
- Karen Morris-Gowdy (born 1956), née Morris, American actress
- Katherine Faw Morris (born 1983), American writer
- Kathleen Morris (1893–1986), Canadian painter
- Kathryn Morris (born 1969), American actress
- Keith Morris (disambiguation)
- Kelvin Morris (born 1982), American football linebacker
- Kendra Morris (born 1981), American soul singer-songwriter
- Kenneth Morris (disambiguation)
- Kevin Morris (disambiguation)
- Kiah Morris (born 1976), Vermont politician
- Kieran Morris (born 1990), Irish hurler
- Kieron Morris (born 1994), English footballer playing for Walsall
- Kindred Jenkins Morris (1819–1884), American politician, mayor of Nashville, Tennessee
- Kirk Morris (born 1942), Italian bodybuilder and actor
- Kirsten Morris (born 1960), Canadian applied mathematician
- Kristi Morris, American politician
- Kylie Morris, Australian and British journalist

=== L ===
- Lamar Morris, American country music singer and musician
- Lamorne Morris (born 1983), American actor
- Lana Morris (1930–1998), British actress
- Landon Morris (born 2002), American football player
- Larry Morris (1933–2012), American football linebacker
- Larry Morris (running back) (born 1962), American football player
- Lawrence Morris, chief of staff and counselor to the president at The Catholic University of America
- Layne Morris (born 1962), American Special Forces soldier
- Lee Morris (disambiguation)
- Leland B. Morris (1886–1950), American diplomat, U.S. Ambassador to Iceland (1942–1944) and to Iran (1944–1945)
- Lelia N. Morris (1862–1929), American hymn writer
- Leon Morris (1914–2006), Australian New Testament scholar
- Leonard Morris (cricketer) (1898–1984), English cricketer
- Leonard Morris (spy) (1748–1831), American spy, justice, sheriff and one of the founders of Charleston, West Virginia
- Leslie Morris (1904–1964), Welsh-Canadian politician, general secretary of the Communist Party of Canada
- Lester Morris, Saint Kitts and Nevis football manager
- Lewis Morris (disambiguation)
- Lily Morris (1882–1952), English comedic music hall performer born Lilles Mary Crosby
- Linda Morris, American television producer and writer
- Lisa Morris-Julian (1975 or 1976–2024), née Morris, Trinidadian politician
- L. N. Morris, American football coach, head coach at Lehigh University
- Logan Morris (1889–1977), judge of the United States Board of Tax Appeals
- Lorenzo Morris (1817–1903), New York politician
- Lucy Leavenworth Wilder Morris (1865–1935), American historian and teacher
- Luismel Morris (born 1997), Cuban football player
- Luke Morris (born 1988), English jockey
- Luzon B. Morris (1827–1895), American lawyer and politician, 55th governor of Connecticut
- Lyndon Henry Morris (1889–1946), Devon chief constable (1931–1946)
- Lynn Morris (disambiguation)

=== M ===
- Maesmore Morris (1868–1917), Australian cricketer
- Malcolm Morris (1913–1972), English lawyer
- Malcolm Morris (dermatologist) (1849–1924), British surgeon and dermatologist
- Mali Morris (born 1945), British artist
- Marcus Morris Sr. (born 1989), American basketball player
- Marcus Morris (publisher) (1915–1989), British priest and publisher
- Maren Morris (born 1990), American musician
- Margaret Morris (disambiguation)
- Margaretta Morris (1797–1867), American entomologist
- Margie Morris (1892–1983), Anglo-Dutch actress
- Marc or Mark Morris (disambiguation)
- Markieff Morris (born 1989), American basketball player
- Marlowe Morris (1915–1978), American jazz pianist and organist
- Martin Morris (disambiguation)
- Mary Morris (disambiguation)
- Mathias Morris (1787–1839), American politician
- Matthew Morris (disambiguation)
- Maureen Morris, New Zealand nurse
- Maurice Morris (born 1979), American football running back
- Max Morris (1925–1998), American basketball and football player
- May Morris (1862–1938), English craftswoman and designer
- Meaghan Morris (born 1950), Australian scholar of cultural studies
- Meg Morris (born 1992), American soccer player
- Melvin Morris (born 1942), American Special Forces Soldier, Vietnam War veteran, Medal of Honor recipient
- Mercury Morris (1947–2024), American football player
- Mervyn Morris (born 1937), Jamaican poet
- Micah Morris (born 2003), American football player
- Michael Morris (disambiguation)
- Mike Morris (disambiguation)
- Milton Morris (1924–2019), Australian politician, New South Wales Minister for Transport
- Mitch Morris (born 1979), American actor
- Mittie Morris (1874–1953), American activist
- Molly R. Morris, American behavioral ecologist
- Monté Morris (born 1995), American basketball player
- Montrose Morris (1861–1916), American architect
- Morgan Morris (born 1998), Welsh rugby union player
- Mount Etna Morris (1900–1988), American politician, State Treasurer of Missouri
- Mouse Morris (born 1951), Irish racehorse trainer and jockey
- Myra Morris (1893–1966), Australian poet and novelist
- Myron Newton Morris (1810–1885), American educator, politician and Congregationalist minister

=== N ===
- Nancy Morris (born 1961), Reform rabbi of the Glasgow Reform Synagogue
- Naomi E. Morris (1921–1986), American jurist, Chief Judge of the North Carolina Court of Appeals
- Nasief Morris (born 1981), South African footballer
- Natali Morris (born 1978), American technology news journalist
- Nate Morris (born 1980), American entrepreneur
- Nathan Morris (born 1971), American singer, founding member of the band Boyz II Men
- Nathan Morris (evangelist) (born 1979), British and American evangelist
- Neil Morris (born 1970), English footballer
- Nelson Morris (1838–1907), American meat packer
- Neva Morris (1895–2010), American supercentenarian
- Newbold Morris (1902–1966), American politician and lawyer
- Niall Morris (disambiguation)
- Nicholas Morris (disambiguation)
- Nigel Morris (born 1958), British businessman, co-founder of Capital One Financial Services
- Nizah Morris (1955–2002), American transgender entertainer
- Noel Morris (born 1975), Irish hurler
- Norman Morris (1920–2008), British obstetrician
- Norman Morris (Australian cricketer) (1907–1982)
- Norman Morris (English cricketer) (1849–1874)
- Norval Morris (1923–2004), Australian and American law professor, criminologist

=== O ===
- Olive Morris (1952–1979), British civil rights activist
- Oliver Morris (1916–1944), Welsh rugby union and rugby league footballer
- Olivia Morris (born 1997), English actress
- Oscar Morris (1876–1939), American politician
- Oswald Morris (1915–2014), British cinematographer
- Owen Morris (born 1968), British record producer

=== P ===
- Pamela Morris (1906–2002), English teacher and publisher
- Pat Morris (disambiguation)
- Patricia Morris, Baroness Morris of Bolton (born 1953), British peer, Shadow Minister for Women, Opposition Whip for the Conservative Party
- Patrick Morris (disambiguation)
- Patricia "Patsy" Morris (1966–1980), British murdered child
- Paul Morris (disambiguation)
- Paula Morris (born 1965), New Zealand writer
- Percy Morris (1893–1967), British railway clerk, trade unionist and politician
- Percy Morris (cricketer) (1881–1975), Welsh cricketer
- Peter Morris (disambiguation)
- Philip Morris (disambiguation)
- Phyllis Morris (furniture designer) (1925–1988), American furniture designer
- P. J. Morris, 20th-century first-class cricketer

=== Q ===
- Quintin Morris (born 1999), American football player

=== R ===
- R. Morris (footballer) (c. 1864–?), English footballer
- Rachel Morris (born 1979), British Paralympic cyclist and rower
- Rae Morris (born 1992), British singer and songwriter
- Raheem Morris, American football coach
- Ralph Camroux Morris (1895–1977), British Indian hunter-naturalist and politician
- Randall Morris (born 1961), American football running back
- Randolph Morris (born 1986), American basketball player for the Beijing Ducks of the Chinese Basketball Association
- Ray Morris (1908–1933), Australian rugby league footballer
- Raymond Morris (disambiguation)
- Rebecca Morris (born 1969), American abstract painter
- Rebecca Morris (author), American true-crime author
- Reggie Morris (1886–1928), American actor, director and screenwriter
- Rhys Hopkin Morris (1888–1956), Welsh politician
- Ricardo Morris (disambiguation)
- Richard Morris (disambiguation)
- Rien Morris, Marshallese politician
- Rob Morris (disambiguation)
- Robert Morris (disambiguation)
- Robin Morris (born 1976), Indian cricketer
- Rod Morris (born 1950), Australian rugby league footballer
- Rodney Morris (born 1970), American pool player
- Roger Morris (disambiguation)
- Roland S. Morris (1874–1945), U.S. Ambassador to Japan
- R. O. Morris (1886–1948), British composer and teacher
- Ron Morris (disambiguation)
- Rooster Morris, American songwriter, musician and children's writer
- Rosa M. Morris (1914–2011), British applied mathematician
- Rosemary Morris (water polo) (born 1986), British Olympic water polo player
- Roy Morris (c. 1930–2011), British Scout Leader, recipient of the Silver Wolf Award
- R. Scott Morris, American financial engineer
- Rupert Morris (1843–1918), Welsh clergyman and antiquarian
- Russell Morris (disambiguation)
- Ruth Morris (1933–2001), Canadian sociologist, penologist and prison abolitionist
- Ruth Morris (athlete) (born 1962), United States Virgin Islands Olympic sprinter
- Ruthie Morris (born 1964), musician
- R. Winston Morris (born 1941), American tubist

=== S ===
- Samuel Morris (disambiguation)
- Sandi Morris (born 1992), American pole vaulter
- Sarah Morris (disambiguation)
- S. Brent Morris, American mathematician, historian of freemasonry
- Sean Morris (born 1982), American lacrosse player
- Sean Morris (cricketer) (born 1968), English cricketer
- Seb Morris (born 1995), British racing driver
- Seth Morris (born 1970), American actor, comedian and writer
- Seymour Morris (1913–1991), Welsh footballer
- Shane Morris (born 1994), American football quarterback
- Shaquille Morris (born 1994), American basketball player
- Sharon Morris, Welsh poet
- Shellie Morris, Indigenous Australian singer-songwriter
- Sian Morris (born 1965), Welsh sprinter
- Sienna Morris (born 1983), American painter
- Simon Morris (disambiguation)
- Sion Morris (born 1977), Welsh cricketer
- Siwan Morris (born 1976), Welsh actress
- Solomon Morris (born 1990), Sierra Leonean footballer
- Staats Long Morris (1728–1800), major-general in the British Army during the American Revolution, Governor of Quebec
- Stan Morris (1893–1948), Australian rules footballer
- Stephen Morris (disambiguation)
- Stephon Morris (born 1991), American football cornerback
- Steve Morris (disambiguation)
- Stevland Hardaway Morris (born 1950), known professionally as Stevie Wonder, American singer-songwriter and musician
- Stewart Morris (1909–1991), British Olympic sailor
- Stuart Morris, Australian lawyer, justice of the Supreme Court of Victoria (2003–2007)
- Stuyvesant Fish Morris (1843–1928), American physician
- Sue Morris (born 1958), New Zealand cricketer
- Sylvester Morris (born 1977), American football wide receiver
- Sylvia Morris (disambiguation)

=== T ===
- Talwin Morris (1865–1911), British book designer
- Tashreeq Morris (born 1994), South African footballer
- Taylor Morris (luger) (born 1991), American Olympic luger
- Teddy Morris (1910–1965), Canadian football player
- Terence Morris (born 1979) American National Basketball Association and Israel Basketball Premier League basketball player
- Terry Morris (disambiguation)
- Tess Morris (born 1977), British screenwriter
- Tessa Morris-Suzuki (born 1951), née Morris, British historian
- Thomas Morris (disambiguation)
- Tim Morris (born 1955), Australian politician
- Tim Morris (priest), Anglican Dean of Edinburgh from 1992 to 2001
- Timothy Morris (diplomat) (born 1958), British diplomat and ambassador
- Toby Morris (politician) (1899–1973), American politician
- Tom Morris (disambiguation)
- Tracie Morris, American poet
- Trefor Morris (born 1934), British law enforcer, Chief Inspector of Constabulary
- Trevor Morris (disambiguation)

=== U ===
- Una Morris (born 1947), Jamaican sprinter

=== V ===
- Valentine Morris (1727–1789), British landowner and politician, Governor of St. Vincent
- Vernon Morris (1900–1973), Welsh cricketer
- Victor Morris (born 1985), American basketball player
- Victor Pierpont Morris (1891–1974), American professor, dean and interim president
- Victor Vaughen Morris (1873–1929), American and Peruvian businessman and bar owner, inventor of pisco sour cocktail
- Violette Morris (1893–1944), French Olympic athlete

=== W ===
- Walter Morris (1880–1961), American baseball player
- Walter F. Morris Jr., American cultural preservationist
- Wanya Morris (born 1973), American R&B singer with the group Boyz II Men
- Wanya Morris (American football) (born 2000), American football player
- Warren Morris (born 1974), American Olympic baseball player
- Wayne Morris (disambiguation)
- Wesley Morris (born 1975), American journalist, film critic and podcast host
- W. F. Morris (1892–1975), English novelist
- Whiz Morris (1898–1984), English cricketer
- Wilber Morris (1937–2002), American jazz double bass player
- William Morris (disambiguation)
- Wolfe Morris (born Woolf Steinberg; 1925–1996), English actor
- Wright Morris (1910–1998), American novelist, photographer, and essayist
- Wyn Morris (1929–2010), Welsh conductor

=== Y ===
- Yemiyah Morris (born 1998), American basketball player
- Yolonda Morris, American politician

=== Z ===
- Zac Morris (born 1978), English cricketer
- Zack Morris (actor) (born 1998), English actor

== Fictional characters ==
- Archie Morris, in the television series ER
- Christine Morris, in the television series Christine Morris series
- Dinah Morris, in George Eliot's novel Adam Bede (1859)
- Lou Anthony Morris, in the British television series Friday Night Dinner
- Nikki Morris, in the 2004 video game Need for Speed: Underground 2
- Quincey Morris, in Bram Stoker's horror novel Dracula (1897)
- Rhydian Morris, in the British television series Wolfblood
- Zack Morris, a character in the sitcoms Good Morning, Miss Bliss, Saved by the Bell, and Saved by the Bell: The College Years
- Mr. Morris, in the television series Arthur

== See also ==
- Morris (given name)
- Morris family (disambiguation)
- Morris baronets
- Morriss, surname
- Maurice (disambiguation)
- Morrice
