= Mary Morris (disambiguation) =

Mary Morris (1915–1988) was a British actress.

Mary Morris may also refer to:

- Mary Philipse Morris (1730–1825), American socialite
- Mary Morris Knowles (née Morris, 1733–1807), English Quaker poet and abolitionist
- Mary Wells Morris (1764–1819), namesake of Wellsboro, Pennsylvania
- Mary Morris Husband (née Morris, 1826–1894), American Civil War nurse
- May Morris (Mary Morris, 1862–1938), English craftswoman and designer
- Mary Morris (doctor) (1873–1925), British doctor and suffragist
- Mary Morris Knibb (née Morris, 1886–1964), Jamaican teacher, social reformer and philanthropist
- Mary Morris (American actress) (1895–1970)
- Mary Morris (diarist) (1921–1997), Irish nurse and diarist
- Mary McGarry Morris (born 1943), American novelist
- Mary Morris (writer) (born 1947), American author
