= Frunk (disambiguation) =

Frunk is a trunk at the front of a vehicle.

Frunk may refer to:

== People ==
- Frunk Murnis (Frank Morris, born 1981), American speedcuber
- Brandon Frunk, a mixed martial artist who had a bout in SFL 50, see 2014–2016 in SFL numbered events
- Hans Von Frunk, a German high officer in the Spanish Civil War at the Badajoz massacre

== Media ==
- Frunk, a series of live albums by Bob Schneider
- Frunk, a 2003 short film from Kristian Eidnes Andersen
- "Frunk", a 2010 song by Adebisi Shank from the album This Is the Second Album of a Band Called Adebisi Shank
