= Stephon =

Stephon is a masculine given name. Notable people with the name include:

- Stephon Alexander (born 1971), Trinidadian-born American theoretical physicist, cosmologist, musician and author
- Stephon Castle (born 2004), American basketball player
- Stephon Clark (1995–2018), American man shot dead by police
- Stephon Gilmore (born 1990), American football player
- Stephon Heyer (born 1984), American football player
- Stephon Marbury (born 1977), American basketball player and coach
- Stephon Morris (born 1991), American football player
- Stephon Tuitt (born 1993), American football player
- Stephon Williams (born 1993), American professional ice hockey player
