= Alexander Morrison =

Alexander or Alex Morrison may refer to:

- Alexander Morrison (cricketer) (1937–2025), New Zealand cricketer and tennis administrator
- Alexander Morrison (politician) (1851–1930), Canadian Member of Parliament
- Alexander Morrison (headmaster) (1829–1903), Australian headmaster of Scotch College
- Alexander Morrison (botanist) (1849–1913), Australian botanist
- Alexander B. Morrison (1930–2018), Canadian scientist, academic, civil servant and leader in The Church of Jesus Christ of Latter-day Saints
- Alexander Francis Morrison, founder of Morrison & Foerster
- Alexander Morrison (judge) (1927–2012), British judge
- Alexander Morrison (historian) (born 1978), British historian
- Alex Morrison (Canadian Forces officer) (born 1941), former officer of the Canadian Forces
- Alex J. Morrison, golf instructor
- Alex Gene Morrison (born 1975), English artist
- Alex Morrison, character in Alex in Wonderland
- Alexander Morrison (police officer) (1927–2018), Scottish police officer
