= Alexander Morris =

Alexander Morris may refer to:

- Alexander Morris (politician) (1826–1889), Ontario politician
- Alexander Morris (cricketer) (1858–1918), New Zealand cricketer
- Alexander Webb Morris (1856–1935), Quebec politician
- Alex Morris (born 1976), English cricketer
- Alexander Morris (singer) (born 1971), American musical artist

== See also ==
- Alexander Morrison (disambiguation)
- Morris Alexander
