= Michael Norris =

Michael or Mike Norris may refer to:

- Michael Norris (footballer), Australian football player
- Michael Norris (politician), American politician
- Michael Norris (composer) (born 1973), New Zealand composer
- Mike Norris (actor) (born 1963), American actor, eldest son of Chuck Norris
- Mike Norris (baseball) (born 1955), American baseball player
- Mike Norris (businessman), chief executive officer of Computacenter plc
- Mike Norris (football manager), English football manager

== See also ==
- Michael Morris (disambiguation)
- Michael Dorris
