= Derges =

Derges is a surname. Notable people with the surname include:

- Jack Derges (fl. 2007), British actor
- Susan Derges (born 1955), British photographic artist
- Tricia Derges (fl. 2021–2022), American politician

== See also ==
- Derge, a town in Sichuan, China
