= Lynn Morris =

Lynn Morris may refer to:

- Lynn Morris (academic), South African scientist
- Lynn Morris (author) (1954–2017), American Christian fiction author
- Lynn Morris (musician) (born 1948), American bluegrass musician
- Lynn Morris (politician) (born 1949), American politician, member of the Missouri House of Representatives (2013–2020)
