= Jenny Morris =

Jenny Morris may refer to:

- Jenny Morris (chef), South African chef
- Jenn Morris (born 1972), Australian field hockey player
- Jenny Morris (musician) (born 1956), New Zealand/Australian singer, songwriter
- Jenny Morris (environmental health), British Environmental Health Officer
