= Francis Morris =

Francis Morris may refer to:

- Francis Morris (politician) (1862–1947), Newfoundland solicitor and politician
- Francis Orpen Morris (1810–1893), Irish clergyman
- Francis Asbury Morris (1817–1881), attorney general of the Republic of Texas
- Greg Morris (Francis Gregory Morris, 1933–1996), actor

== See also ==
- Frank Morris (disambiguation)
- Frances Morris (disambiguation) for female version of the name
- Francis Maurice, Austrian field marshal
