= Bert Morris =

Bert Morris may refer to:

- Bert D. Morris Jr. (1914-1959), actor
- Bert Morris (footballer) (1889–1948)
- Bert Morris, character in Berlin, Appointment for the Spies

== See also ==
- Albert Morris (disambiguation)
- Robert Morris (disambiguation)
- Herbert Morris (disambiguation)
