= Bay Revival =

The Bay Revival (also known as the Bay of the Holy Spirit Revival) was a revival event of the Christian faith that started at the Church of His Presence in Daphne, Alabama, in July 2010, and after April 2011 expanded to global telecasts. It had grown to become a weekly event that was held for a period of nine months in Mobile, Alabama, before taking to the road to tour other U.S. cities. The revival has been led by John Kilpatrick, pastor of the Church of His Presence and Nathan Morris of "Shake the Nations" in Great Britain. The meetings have been characterized by extended periods of worship led by Lydia Stanley, sermons challenging people to turn back to God, prayer for the sick, and claims of divine healing that have been widely publicized. It has also gained attention via an international television audience.

== History ==
The roots of the Bay Revival lie in the Brownsville Revival period from 1995 through to 2000, led by John Kilpatrick and evangelist Steve Hill in Pensacola, Florida, which is reported to have been attended by four million people. During this period, Kilpatrick became well known as he traveled increasingly across the United States, encouraging pastors to pursue "revival". Kilpatrick eventually left Brownsville in 2003 and moved to Daphne to undertake the role of pastor at the "Church of His Presence". It was during the Church's 2010 "Open the Heavens Conference" that the revival phenomenon was claimed by those in attendance to have returned; it was reported to have taken place whilst Nathan Morris was preaching during the final night of the event, on July 23. The "outbreak of revival" at the 2010 conference was characterized by claims of people being supernaturally healed. Subsequently, the meetings at the Daphne Civic Center were extended and continued to be held each weekend, attracting people from across America and other countries.

The revival was moved to the Mobile Convention Center, in Mobile, Alabama, to accommodate the growing crowds and became known as "The Bay of the Holy Spirit Revival" after the original Spanish name for Mobile Bay. Historically, Mobile Bay was labelled on early Spanish maps as "Bahía del Espíritu Santo" ("Bay of the Holy Spirit"). The revival continued in Mobile until April 2011, lasting nine months, and on April 15, it was announced that it would go on tour nationwide.

Since then, the "Bay Revival on Tour" has been held in cities across the USA including: Youngstown, OH; Dallas, TX; Sayreville, NJ; Detroit MI; Lake Charles, LA; Phoenix, AZ.

The Orlando Sentinel reported that the "Bay Revival" was also held in Orlando as part of GOD TV's launch into the city.

== Media Attention ==
As people claimed to be healed, the Bay Revival became the focus of media attention. ABC News featured it in a Nightline report as part of its Faith Matters series, questioning "the fine line between faith and false hope". The report includes accounts of people who say they were healed and an interview with Nathan Morris and John Kilpatrick. The Huffington Post observed that thousands of people from across the USA attended the meetings, "having been spurred on by viral Internet videos". GOD TV started airing three-hour broadcasts from the Bay Revival in November 2010, expanding it to a global audience and rapidly increasing its international following.

== Delia Knox ==
Many people have claimed to be healed through the Bay Revival, posting their stories on the Internet and YouTube. The most publicized of these is Delia Knox, a well known Gospel singer who was paralyzed for 22.5 years after a car accident, but got out of her wheelchair and is now walking after attending. The video of her being prayed for by Nathan Morris has received over 400,000 hits on YouTube.

"For years, Delia was known as the wheelchair bound gospel singer who amazed audiences with her vocal talents. However, taking part in the Bay of the Holy Spirit Revival on August 27, 2010 made her an international sensation,"

Ed Reilly of Channel 7 Eye Witness News reported.

"During the revival, Delia heard a voice telling her to 'Just get up'. After being prayed over, she rose from her wheelchair and began to move her legs. With assistance, she walked in front of the amazed audience."

The Channel 7 report also contains footage of Delia meeting her parents who were amazed to see her walking again.

== Message ==
The preaching of the Bay Revival focuses on calling people back to holy living with an emphasis on "the Blood of Jesus" and "the Cross". Having turned from a life of addiction, Nathan Morris encourages people to follow his example and turn to God. One of his messages is entitled, 'Loose that man, let him go' based on the story of Lazarus in verse John 11:44. "Sin will make you a slave when God has called you to be a son or a daughter. It's time to put off the grave clothes," he says, "those who live in a tomb of addiction or of fear are in bondage and God wants to set them free." John Kilpatrick teaches on revival in the church, drawing from his experience at Brownsville. He says "revival is not for the saved, it's time for the Church to go after and accept those who are in sin. That's what Revival is all about. God catches His fish first and then cleans them".

== Music ==
The Bay Revival has developed its own distinct sound with original songs written and performed by Lydia Stanley, who has released two albums: Bay of the Holy Spirit Revival Worship, Volume 1 and Oh, What My Eyes Have Seen, Bay Revival Worship, Volume 2. Stanley attended the Brownsville Revival in 1996, where she is said to have received her call to ministry. She had graduated from the Brownsville Revival School of Ministry in 2004 and has served as worship leader at Church of His Presence in Mobile, AL. She has been interviewed by Sid Roth of It's Supernatural, who said, "She was hand-picked by God to lead worship and she will teach you how your home can be filled with God's Glory." According to the Bay Revival Worship Volume 1 cover, "Lydia Stanley and the team have led millions around the world in passionate worship through GOD TV."
