= George Morris =

George Morris may refer to:

== Entertainment ==
- George L. K. Morris (1905–1975), American abstract painter
- George Pope Morris (1802–1864), American poet and publisher
- George S. Morris (musician) (1876–1958), Scottish composer and singer of cornkisters
- George Taylor Morris (1947–2009), American disc jockey and radio personality
- George Redmond Morris, 4th Baron Killanin (born 1947), Irish film producer

== Politics ==
- George Morris (Irish politician) (1833–1912), MP for Galway Borough
- George Morris (Australian politician) (1892–1967), member of the Queensland Legislative Assembly
- George Morris (New Zealand politician) (1840–1903), New Zealand politician

== Sports ==
- George Morris (American football, born 1931) (1931–2007), American football center and linebacker
- George Morris (halfback) (1919–1999), NFL halfback
- George Morris (footballer) (1874–?), English footballer active in the 1890s/1900s
- George Morris (umpire) (born 1957), New Zealand cricket umpire
- George H. Morris (born 1938), American trainer and judge of horses
- George Lockwood Morris (1859–1947), ironfounder and Wales international rugby player

== Other ==
- George Morris (American writer) (1903-1997), American writer and labor editor
- G. Elliott Morris (born 1996), American journalist
- George Franklin Morris (1866–1953), U.S. federal judge
- George Henry Morris (1872–1914), first commanding officer to lead an Irish Guards battalion into battle
- George Mortimer Morris (1871–1954), British Indian Army officer during the First World War
- George Q. Morris (1874–1962), American leader in the Church of Jesus Christ of Latter-day Saints
- George Sylvester Morris (1840–1889), American educator and philosophical writer
