= Sarah Jane Morris =

Sarah Jane Morris may refer to:

- Sarah Jane Morris (singer) (born 1959), English singer
- Sarah Jane Morris (actress) (born 1977), American actress

== See also ==
- Sarah Morris (disambiguation)
