= Jamie Gragg =

American politician

Jamie Ray Gragg

Member of the Missouri House of Representatives from the 140th district
- Incumbent
- Assumed office January 4, 2023
- Preceded by: Tricia Derges

Personal details
- Party: Republican
- Education: Southwest Baptist University

Jamie Ray Gragg is an American politician serving as a Republican member of the Missouri House of Representatives, representing the state's 140th House district. Gragg is a businessman. In the 2022 Missouri House of Representatives election, Gragg was elected in District 140.

== Early life and education ==
Gragg's family has been in what is now Missouri since the early 1800's. His mother and father briefly moved to Orange County, CA for work when they had their three children. Soon after in 1977 they returned to Ozark, Missouri from the Los Angeles area. He has a degree from Southwest Baptist University.

== Career ==
Prior to entering politics, Gragg worked for Boy Scouts of America in Colorado and at Christian camps in Missouri and Texas, as well as other ministry work. He had long term employment as a character at Silver Dollar City.

=== Missouri House of Representatives ===
Gragg opposes abortion, strengthening barriers to constitutional ballot initiatives, believes that childcare should be privatized and that school programs put daycares out of business, says that state oversight and bureaucracy impose on teachers' work and that teachers should be paid more, and supports cutting taxes and reducing regulation.

==== Food stamps ====
In 2025, Gragg co-sponsored a bill to restrict eligible food items under Supplemental Nutrition Assistance Program. Similar bills have been filed in other states with support from Foundation for Government Accountability. Fellow Republicans opposed the bill, saying that a list of foods considered unhealthy could be endlessly expanded.

==== LGBT ====
Gragg has unsuccessfully sponsored bills against the LGBT community in Missouri. In 2024, Gragg introduced a bill to criminalize school teachers who support transgender youth as Tier 1 sex offenders. His older brother contacted state LGBTQ advocacy group PROMO to speak out against the bill, which he describes as "hateful and malicious." Gragg named a Springfield teacher as someone who had helped a student transition, a false claim that was repeated by media and other political campaigns. The teacher was fired and told media that she had been supporting a student experiencing domestic violence, with no connection to gender transition. Gragg later backtracked his claim in an interview, saying that he had been looking outside his district for a real-life example to support his bill.

In 2025, Gragg told media that he was concerned about the upcoming Ozarks Pridefest in Springfield, Missouri, claiming that drag performances are " inherently sexualized" and contribute to mental illness. In response to reporters, a Pridefest organizer observed that Gragg has made these claims repeatedly, and that constituents would be better served by a representative who addressed issues like affordable food and housing and underfunded schools.

== Personal life ==
Gragg has four adult children and is also a grandfather.
