= Irma Adelman =

Romanian-American economist (1930–2017)

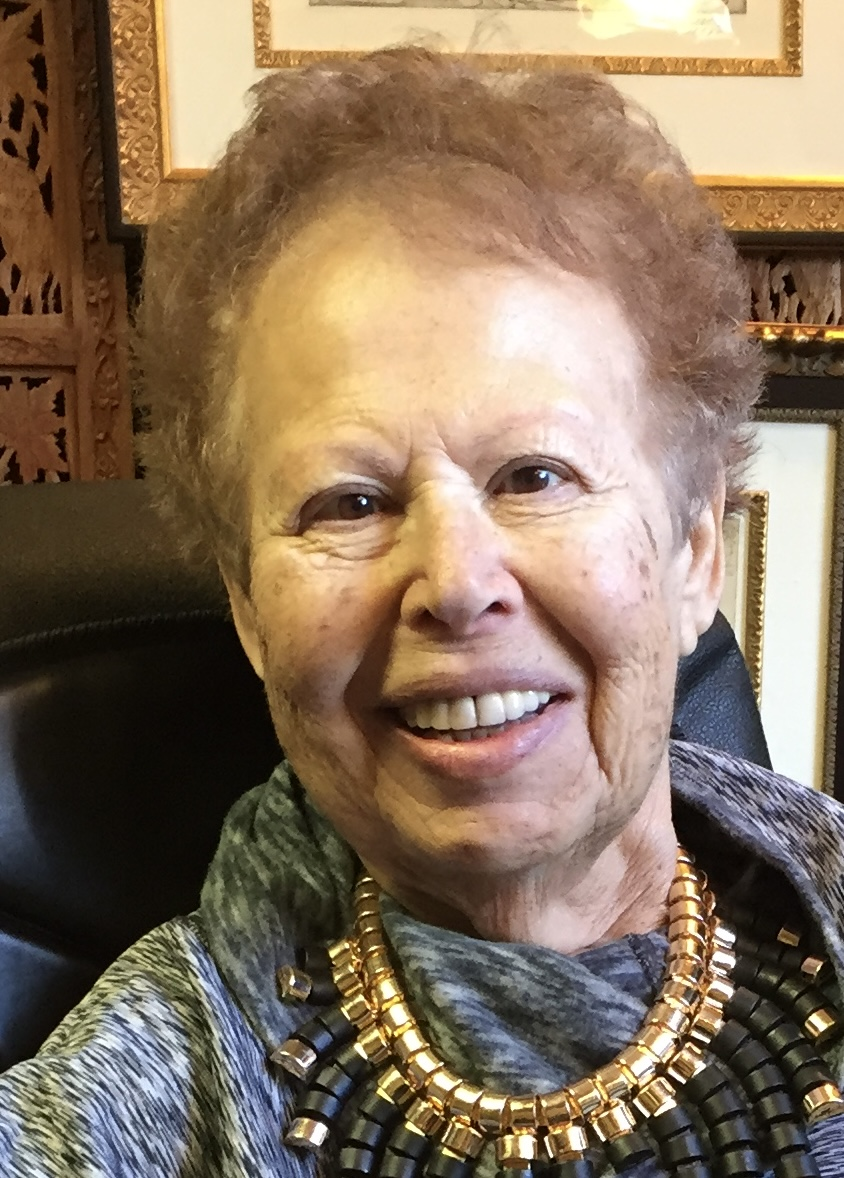
- Born: Irma Glicman; March 14, 1930; Chernivtsi, Romania
- Died: February 5, 2017 (aged 86); Berkeley, California, U.S.
- Education: University of California, Berkeley
- Occupation: Economist

Irma Glicman Adelman (March 14, 1930 – February 5, 2017) was a Romanian-American economist.

== Early life and education ==
Adelman was born in Chernivtsi, Romania in March 1930. In 1939, fleeing the Nazi regime, she moved with her family to Palestine where she continued her education through high school.

After high school, in 1949, Adelman moved to the United States and attended the University of California, Berkeley, where she received her bachelor's degree in Business Administration in 1950, her Master's in economics in 1951, and her Ph.D. in economics in 1955.

== Career and research ==
Adelman began her career with a two-year stint as an instructor and assistant professor at her alma mater; in the 1958–1959 academic year, she was a visiting professor at Mills College. After that, she became an assistant professor at Stanford University, staying until 1962. That year, Adelman moved to Johns Hopkins University, where she was an associate professor until 1965, when she moved to Northwestern University. She left Northwestern for the University of Maryland in 1972 and stayed there until 1978. She was then a professor in the Department of Agricultural and Resource Economics at the Graduate School of the University of California, Berkeley from 1979 until her 1994 retirement.

Adelman is credited with having made important contributions in the field of development economics. Her studies included the effects of development on a country's economic and political structure, and she has also consulted for the United Nations Division of Industrial Development, the US Department of Agriculture Agency for International Development, and the World Bank.

Noted co-authors include Hollis B. Chenery, Cynthia Taft Morris and Sherman Robinson.

== Honors and awards ==
- Elected Fellow, Econometric Society (1968)
- Elected Fellow, American Academy of Arts and Sciences (1974)
- Cleringa Chair, Leiden University (1977)
- Member, American Economic Association

== Selected bibliography ==
- "Dynamic Properties of the Klein-Goldberger Model", with F.L. Adelman, 1959, Econometrica
- Theories of Economic Growth and Development, 1961.
- "An Econometric Analysis of Population Growth", 1963, AER.
- "Foreign Aid and Economic Development: The case of Greece", with H.B.Chenery, 1966, REStat.
- The Theory and Design of Economic Development, 1966.
- Society, Politics and Economic Development: a quantitative approach, with C.T. Morris, 1967.
- Economic Growth and Social Equity in Developing Countries, with C.T. Morris, 1973.
- "Strategies for Equitable Growth", 1974, Challenge
- "Development Economics: a reassessment of goals", 1975, AER.
- "Growth, Income Distribution and Equity-Oriented Development Strategies", 1975, World Development
- "Policies for Equitable Growth", with C.T. Morris, and S. Robinson, 1976, World Development
- Income Distribution Policy in Developing Countries: A Case Study of Korea, with S. Robinson, 1978.
- "Growth and Impoverishment in the Middle of the 19th Century", with C.T. Morris, 1978, World Development
- Redistribution Before Growth: A strategy for developing countries. 1978.
- "Beyond Export-Led Growth", 1984, World Development
- "A Poverty-Focused Approach to Development Policy", 1986, in Lewis, editor, Development Strategies Reconsidered
- "Confessions of an Incurable Romantic", 1988, BNLQR.
- Comparative Patterns of Economic Development, 1850–1914, 1988.
