= Hugh Morris =

Hugh Morris may refer to:

- Bill DeMott (born 1966), professional wrestler previously known as Hugh Morrus
- Hugh Morris (cricketer) (1963–2025), Welsh former cricketer
- Hugh Morris (footballer, born 1900) (1900–1965), Scottish footballer
- Hugh Morris (footballer, born 1872) (1872–1897), Welsh footballer
- Hugh Morris (Australian footballer) (1932–2013), Australian rules footballer
- Hugh M. Morris (1878–1966), American judge
- Hugh Morris (businessman) (1929–2010), New Zealand businessman who founded McDonald's New Zealand in 1976
- Hugh Morris, Mii character used in American promotional material for the Nintendo video game Tomodachi Life: Living The Dream
