= Gertrude Maesmore Morris =

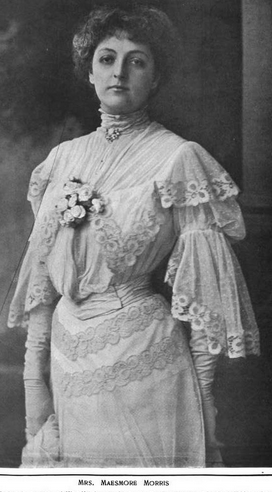
- Morris in 1903
- Born: Gertrude Willmott; 2 June 1872; Croydon, Surrey, England
- Died: 24 June 1951 (aged 79); London, England
- Other names: Mrs Maesmore Morris; Gertrude Sutor
- Spouses: Maesmore Morris (m. 1892; div. 1905); Robert McDonald Sutor
- Children: 3

Gertrude Maesmore Morris (née Willmott, later Sutor; 2 June 1872 – 24 June 1951), also known as Mrs Maesmore Morris, was an English actress active in England and Australia.

== Biography ==
Morris was born Gertrude Willmott (Note: Also cited as Wilmott.) on 2 June 1872 in Croydon, Surrey (present-day London) to Julius John Eardley Willmott (1849–1897), a physician, and Eulelia Harriet Willmott (c. 1854–1877). On 3 July 1872, Willmott was baptised at St John the Evangelist. The eldest of two siblings, Willmott's mother died in 1877 at the age of 23. Through her father's second marriage, Willmott had at least one younger half brother.

The family later emigrated to Melbourne in the then Colony of Victoria. On 14 July 1892, Willmott married Maesmore Morris, an accountant, in South Yarra, Colony of Victoria. The following year Morris gave birth to the couple's son, after which her husband became violent towards her and started to drink heavily.

In 1897, Morris entered into a contract with J. C. Williamson to perform at the Princess Theatre in Melbourne. Initially supportive, Morris's husband soon grew more physical abusive and locked her of the home, after which she returned to live with her father. Morris toured Australia and later acted in England from 1899 to 1904. In 1905, Morris was granted a divorce on grounds of desertion.

On 25 September 1906, Morris married Lieutenant Robert McDonald Sutor of the Royal Navy. Sutor retired from acting following her marriage, and had two further children. On 24 June 1951, Morris died in London aged 79.
