= Patrick Morris =

Patrick or Pat Morris may refer to:

- Patrick Morris (merchant) (c. 1789–1849), Irish-born merchant, author and politician in Newfoundland
- Patrick Morris (director), British wildlife film and TV producer and director
- Pat Morris (American football) (born 1954), offensive line coach
- Patrick Morris (American football) (born 1995), American football offensive lineman
- Pat Morris (politician) (born 1938), American sports agent, lawyer and mayor of San Bernardino, California
- Patrick John Morris (1948–2008), British composer, musician and songwriter
- MV Patrick Morris, Canadian train ferry that sank in 1970
