= Steve Morris =

Steve Morris may refer to:

- Steve Morris (rugby union) (1896–1965), Welsh international rugby union player
- Steve Morris (rugby league) (born 1957), Australian former rugby league footballer
- Steve Morris (soccer) (born 1967), retired Scottish association football player and coach
- Steven Morris (Australian footballer) (born 1988), Australian rules footballer
- Steve Morris (musician), guitarist who performed with Heartland and Ian Gillan (not to be confused with Steve Morse)
- Steve "Chicken" Morris, American contestant of Survivor: China

== See also ==
- Stephen Morris (disambiguation)
