= Jim Morris (disambiguation) =

Jim Morris is a former professional baseball player and subject of the 2002 film The Rookie.

Jim or Jimmy Morris may also refer to:

- Jim Morris (racewalker) (1915–1985)
- Jimmy Morris (English footballer) (1887-1959), English footballer
- Jimmy Morris (Australian footballer) (1891–1971), Australian rules footballer
- Jimmy Morris (hurler) (1896–1932), Irish hurler for the Galway senior team
- Jim Morris (bodybuilder) (1935–2016), American bodybuilder
- Jim Morris (baseball coach) (born 1950), head baseball coach at the University of Miami
- Jim Morris or Hillbilly Jim (born 1952), former professional wrestler in the World Wrestling Federation
- Jim Morris (playwright) (born 1953), English playwright
- Jim Bob Morris (born 1961), American football player
- Jim Morris (Ontario politician), former Canadian political candidate from the Natural Law Party of Canada
- Jim Morris (record producer), record producer and engineer, owner of Morrisound Recording studios in Tampa, Florida
- Jim Morris (film producer), American film producer and executive at Pixar and ILM
- Jim Morris (rugby league) (1895–1988), Australian rugby league player
- Jim Morris (Royal Marines officer), British general
- Jim Morris, whose US Army experience served as the basis for the film Operation Dumbo Drop

== See also ==
- James Morris (disambiguation)
