= Allan Morris (disambiguation) =

Allan Morris (born 1940) is an Australian politician.

Allan Morris may also refer to:

- Allan Morris (Canadian football) (1910–1965)

== See also ==
- Allan Pollok-Morris, British documentary photographer
- Alan Morris (disambiguation)
- Allen Morris (disambiguation)
