= Peter Maurice =

Peter Maurice may refer to:

- Peter Maurice (priest) (1803–1878), Welsh priest and writer
- Peter Maurice (bishop) (born 1951), Bishop of Taunton
- Peter Maurice (Dean of Bangor) (died 1759)
- Peter Maurice Music, a UK based music publishing company established in 1930

== See also ==
- Peter Morris (disambiguation)
