= Colin Morris =

Colin Morris may refer to:

- Colin Morris (footballer) (born 1953), English former footballer
- Colin Morris (Methodist minister) (1929–2018), formerly head of BBC religious broadcasting
- Colin Morris (playwright) (1916–1996), British playwright, screenwriter and actor

== See also ==
- Morris (surname)
