= Terry Morris =

Terry Morris may refer to:

- Terry Lesser Morris (1914-1993), American freelance magazine writer
- Terry Morris (photographer) (born 1965), Welsh artist
- Terence Morris (born 1979), American former professional basketball player

== See also ==
- Morris (surname)
