= Morriss =

Morriss is an old Welsh surname. It derives from the Latin name Mauritius, which means dark. In Great Britain, Maurice was the learned form of the name Morriss. Notable people with the name include:

- Frank Morriss (1927–2013), American film and television editor
- Guy Morriss (1951–2022), American football player and coach
- Jeremy Morriss, New Zealand Paralympic boccia player
- Margaret Shove Morriss (1884–1975), American historian
- Mark Morriss (born 1971), English singer-songwriter
- Scott Morriss (born 1973), English bass player
- Simon Morriss (born 1985), Australian baseball player

== See also ==
- Morris (surname)
