= Elizabeth Morris =

Elizabeth Morris or variants may refer to:

== Arts and entertainment ==
- Beth Morris (1943–2018), Welsh actress
- Betty Morris, fictional character in The Bradshaws
- Libby Morris (born 1930), Canadian actress
- Liz Morris, actress in Jaws 3-D
- Elizabeth Morris, musician in Allo Darlin'
- Elizabeth Walker Morris (died 1826), English-born American stage actress
- Elizabeth Morris Keller (born 1972), Chilean singer-songwriter

== Others ==
- Betty Morris (bowler) (born 1948), American bowler
- Betty Sue Morris, American politician
- Elizabeth Morris (glaciologist) (born 1946), British glaciologist
- Elizabeth Morris (judge), chief judge in the Local Court of the Northern Territory, Australia
- Elizabeth Carrington Morris (1795–1865), American botanist
- Elisabeth Ljunggren-Morris (born 1948), Swedish swimmer
