= Tom Morris =

Tom Morris may refer to:

- Old Tom Morris (1821–1908), early golf champion
- Young Tom Morris (1851–1875), son of the above, also a golf champion
- Tom Morris (footballer, born 1875) (1875–1942), English footballer who played for Tottenham Hotspur in the 1890s and 1900s
- Tom Morris (footballer, born 1884) (1884–1918), English footballer
- Tom Morris (cyclist) (born 1944), Canadian Olympic cyclist
- Tom Morris (businessman) (born 1954), British billionaire businessman, founder of Home Bargains
- Tom Morris (American football) (born 1960), American football player
- Tom Morris (director) (born 1964), British theatre director, producer, and writer
- Tom Morris Jr., television personality
- Tom Morris (journalist) (born 1991), Australian sports journalist

== See also ==
- Thomas Morris (disambiguation)
