= Alfred Morris =

Alfred Morris is the name of:

- Alfred Hennen Morris (1864–1959), American businessman, politician, and racehorse owner/breeder
- Alfred Morris (cricketer) (1876–1961), English cricketer
- Edwin Morris (bishop) (Alfred Edwin Morris, 1894–1971), Bishop of Monmouth and Archbishop of Wales
- Alf Morris (1928–2012), Baron Morris of Manchester, British Labour Co-operative politician and disability campaigner
- Alfred Morris (university administrator) (born 1941), British academic
- Alfred Morris (American football) (born 1988), American football running back
- Alfred Morris, fictional character from the American TV series Spider-Noir played by Michael Kostroff

== See also ==
- Alfred Warrington-Morris (1883–1962), British Royal Air Force officer
