= Arthur Morris (disambiguation) =

Arthur Morris (1922–2015) was an Australian cricketer.

Arthur Morris may also refer to:

- Arthur Morris (U.S. Army officer) (1843–1892), officer in the United States Army
- Arthur Morris (footballer) (1882–1945), English footballer
- Arthur Morris (bishop) (1898–1977), Anglican bishop
- Arthur E. Morris (born 1946), American politician and engineer

== See also ==
- Arthur Bartlett Maurice, American editor
- Morris (surname)
