= Allen Morris =

Allen Morris may refer to:

- W. Allen Morris, real estate and mortgage broker
- Allen Morris (historian) (1909–2002), historian of the Florida legislature and Clerk of the House
- Allen Morris (tennis) (1932–2017), tennis player and coach

== See also ==
- Allan Morris (disambiguation)
- Alan Morris (disambiguation)
