= Derek Morris =

Derek Morris may refer to:

- Sir Derek Morris (academic) (born 1945), Provost of Oriel College, Oxford
- Derek Morris (ice hockey) (born 1978), Canadian ice hockey defenceman
- Derek Morris (jockey), 1990s UK and Irish based steeplechase rider in Adonis Juvenile Novices' Hurdle
- Derek Morris (Neighbours), fictional character on Australian soap opera Neighbours
- Derek Morris, fictional character on American teen sitcom Saved by the Bell

== See also ==
- Derrick Morris (1930–2005), Europe's longest-surviving heart transplant patient
- DJ Derek (Derek Serpell-Morris, 1941–2016), British DJ
