= Eric Morris =

Eric Morris may refer to:

- Eric Morris (actor) (born 1931), American actor and acting teacher
- Eric "Monty" Morris (born c. 1942), Jamaican musician
- Eric Morris (bassist), American musician
- Eric Morris (footballer, born 1951), Scottish footballer
- Eric Morris (footballer, born 1940) (1940–2011), Welsh footballer
- Eric Morris (1930s footballer), Welsh footballer
- Eric Morris (American football) (born 1985), American football coach and former player
- Eric A. Morris, American television writer and transportation scholar
- Eric Morris (cricketer) (1890–1966), English cricketer and both British Army, and British Indian Army, officer
