= Sarah Morris (disambiguation) =

Sarah Morris (born 1967) is a British artist.

Sarah Morris may also refer to:

- Sarah Morris, a character in the 2014 film Ouija
- Sarah Morris (skier) represented Great Britain at the 1998 Winter Paralympics
- Sarah Morris (synchronized swimmer), participated in 2004 Oceania Swimming Championships

== See also ==
- Sarah Jane Morris (disambiguation)
