= Herbert Morris (disambiguation) =

Herbert Morris (1915–2009) was a rower.

Herbert Morris may also refer to:

- Herbert Stanley Morris (1892–1919), botanist
- Herbert Morris (philosopher) (1928–2022), American philosopher
- Herb Morris, actor in Just Rambling Along

== See also ==
- Bert Morris (disambiguation)
