= Albert Morris (disambiguation) =

Albert Morris (1886–1939) was a botanist.

Albert Morris may also refer to:

- Albert Morris (musician) on National Emblem
- Albert Morris, candidate in Sheffield City Council election, 1973
- Albert Morris, co-founder of Fletcher Construction

== See also ==
- Al Morris, baseball outfielder
- Bert Morris (disambiguation)
