= Barbara Morris =

English arts and crafts scholar (1918–2009)

- in 2009 by Linda Sandino
- Born: Barbara Trotman; 15 November 1918; Willesden
- Died: 15 July 2009 (aged 90); Brighton
- Occupation: Scholar
- Spouse: Max Morris

Barbara Joyce Morris, originally born Barbara Trotman (15 November 1918 – 15 July 2009) was an English artist and scholar in the field of arts and crafts.

== Life ==
Morris was born in Willesden in 1918. She received her education in Art at the Slade School of Fine Art. Her sketches of Quentin Crisp are in the National Portrait gallery. The sketches were made whilst she was studying at the Slade. She was there between 1937 and 1939, when the war interrupted her studies. She married Max Morris on 12 September 1939. She completed her studies at Slade in 1947.

In 1947, she started working at the Victoria and Albert Museum where she was involved with the 1952 exhibition titled Victorian and Edwardian Decorative Arts.

In 1954, she was at the V&A when the thefts of John Nevin were discovered. Nevin was employed at the museum, and in 24 years he had smuggled home many exhibits. Morris had gone to Nevin's home to recover objects where she found curtains made from museum materials and broken former exhibits. She could not discuss her work due to the official secrets act. Nevin's defence was that he loved the things he stole, but Morris had seen how he had broken them to find valuable parts. Morris was responsible to examine the finds to prove that the objects had belonged to the museum, as Nevin had been clever enough to try to remove the records of things that he took.

She continued to be called "Morris" after her first marriage ended in 1960. Her first husband soon remarried; although she started a relationship with Dave Bowman, she did not marry him until 1991.

She retired from the V&A in 1978 and then spent time teaching at Sotheby's. She appeared as an expert of the BBC's Antiques Roadshow.

In 2003, she published a book on embroidery, Victorian Embroidery: An Authoritative Guide, which included photos she had taken at parish churches across the country.

Morris was interviewed as part of an oral history project in February 2009 which included her account of the Nevin affair which was still intriguing. She died in Royal Sussex County Hospital in Brighton in 2009.
