= Bert Morris (footballer) =

Australian rules footballer

Personal information
- Full name: Herbert Norman Morris
- Born: 16 March 1889; Richmond, Victoria
- Died: 14 July 1948 (aged 59); Hawthorn, Victoria
- Height: 183 cm (6 ft 0 in)
- Weight: 83 kg (183 lb)

Playing career^{1}
Years	Club	Games (Goals)
1910	Melbourne	1 (0)
- ^{1} Playing statistics correct to the end of 1910.

Herbert Norman Morris (16 March 1889 – 14 July 1948) was an Australian rules footballer who played for the Melbourne Football Club in the Victorian Football League (VFL).
