= Trevor Morris =

Trevor Morris may refer to:

- Trevor Morris (footballer) (1920–2003), Welsh footballer and manager
- Trevor Morris (rugby union) (born 1942), New Zealand rugby union player
- Trevor Morris (musician) (born 1970), Canadian musical composer
- Trevor Morris (bowls) (born 1956), Australian lawn bowls international

== See also ==
- Trevor Morrice (born 1991), Canadian ski jumper
