= Allan Pollok-Morris =

Allan Pollok-Morris is a British documentary photographer, bookbinder and publisher.

== Background ==
Allan Robert Pollok-Morris (1972), born Rottenrow Maternity Hospital Glasgow, grew up first in Manchester and then Helensburgh on the River Clyde. Schooled Lomond School and Strathallan School. Studied at The Robert Gordon University Aberdeen, Strathclyde University Glasgow and Central Saint Martins School of Art London. More recently, he has been an associate lecturer in photography at Central Saint Martins with the University of the Arts London.

== Exhibitions ==
Exhibitions include:

- Exhibition of his work at the Royal Botanic Garden Edinburgh from September 2008 to January 2009.
- February/March 2009 at the Bonhoga Gallery in Lerwick, Shetland.
- Exhibition of his work curated by the Chicago Botanic Garden in 2010.
- In 2011 Smithsonian exhibition of his work at the United States Botanic Garden in Washington, D.C.
- From October 2013 to March 2014 Exhibition of his work curated by New York Botanical Garden.
- As well as numerous exhibitions throughout London including 2016 'Lenses On Landscape Genius' Somerset House London.

== Honours and awards ==
Elected a Fellow of the Royal Society of Arts (FRSA).

== Publications ==
- Allan Pollok-Morris (2008). Close: A Journey in Scotland. Northfield Editions. ISBN 978-0956033802.
- Allan Pollok-Morris (2010). Close: Landscape Design and Land Art in Scotland. Northfield Editions. ISBN 978-0956033819.
- https://www.jupiterartland.org/shop/the-generous-landscape-ten-years-of-jupiter-artland
