= Andrew Morris =

Andrew or Andy Morris may refer to:

- Andrew Morris (mayor) (died 1594), Mayor of Galway, 1588–1589
- Andrew Morris (gymnast) (born 1961), British Olympic gymnast
- Andrew Maxwell Morris, English acoustic guitarist, pianist, and singer-songwriter
- Andrew Morris (musician), Australian acoustic guitarist and singer-songwriter
- Andrew Morris (organist/conductor) (born 1948), British conductor, organist, adjudicator and teacher
- Andrew Morris (priest) (died 1654), Dean of St Asaph
- Andy Morris (boxer) (born 1983), British boxer
- Andy Morris (footballer) (born 1967), English football player for Chesterfield
- Andrew Morris (baseball) (born 2001), American baseball player
- Sir Andrew Valentine Morris (born 1962), healthcare administrator
- Andrew Morris (Jamaican politician)
- Andrew Morris (physician), British physician and medical informatics researcher

== See also ==
- Andre Morris (born 1972), American former sprinter
