= Jimmy Morris (hurler) =

Irish hurler (1896–1932)

Personal information
- Nickname: Bittu
- Born: 14 September 1896 Gort, County Galway, Ireland
- Died: 18 March 1932 (aged 35) Galway, Ireland
- Occupation: Business
- Height: 5 ft 7 in (170 cm)

Sport
- Sport: Hurling
- Position: Midfield
Club
- Years: Club
- 1914–1932: Gort
Club titles
- Galway titles: 2
Inter-county
- Years: County
- 1922–1924: Galway
Inter-county titles
- Connacht titles: 1
- All-Irelands: 1

James Morris (14 September 1896 – 18 March 1932) was an Irish hurler. Usually lining out at midfield, he was a member of the Galway team that won the 1923 All-Ireland Championship.

Morris enjoyed a club career with Gort that spanned three decades. After joining the club's senior team in his late teens, he won two county championship medals in 1914 and 1916. He later served as captain of the team for over a decade.

After being selected for the Galway senior team in 1922, he won a Connacht medal in his debut championship. He won his sole All-Ireland medal in 1923 after Galway's defeat of Limerick in the final.

Morris died of tuberculosis on 18 March 1932. He was the first member of Galway's inaugural All-Ireland-winning team to die.

== Honours ==
Gort

- Galway Senior Hurling Championship (2): 1914, 1916

Galway

- All-Ireland Senior Hurling Championship (1): 1923
- Connacht Senior Hurling Championship (1): 1922
