= Ricardo Morris =

Ricardo Morris is the name of:

- Ricardo Morris (footballer, born 1992), Jamaican footballer
- Ricardio Morris (born 1993), Barbadian footballer
