= Tom Morris (footballer, born 1884) =

English footballer

Personal information
- Full name: Thomas Henry Morris
- Date of birth: 14 September 1884
- Place of birth: Caistor, England
- Date of death: 24 March 1918 (aged 33)
- Place of death: Somme, France
- Position: Centre half

Senior career*
Years	Team	Apps	(Gls)
- Haycroft Rovers
- Grimsby Rovers
1906–1907	Grimsby Town	28	(0)
1907–1909	Brighton & Hove Albion	29	(3)
1909–1913	Leeds City	106	(3)
1913–1914	Scunthorpe & Lindsey United		
1914–1915	Coventry City	18	(2)
- * Club domestic league appearances and goals

Thomas Henry Morris (14 September 1884 – 24 March 1918) was an English professional footballer who played in the Football League for Leeds City and Grimsby Town, as well as in the Southern League for Brighton & Hove Albion. A centre half as a player, he later coached at Scunthorpe & Lindsey United.

== Personal life ==
In March 1915, during the second year of the First World War, Morris enlisted in the Lincolnshire Regiment. He was serving as a sergeant when he was killed in the Somme sector on 24 March 1918. Morris is commemorated on the Pozières Memorial.

== Career statistics ==
Appearances and goals by club, season and competition
Club	Season	League			FA Cup		Total	
Club	Season	Division	Apps	Goals	Apps	Goals	Apps	Goals
Leeds City	1908–09	Second Division	9	0	—		9	0
Leeds City	1909–10	Second Division	24	1	0	0	24	1
Leeds City	1910–11	Second Division	36	2	1	0	37	2
Leeds City	1911–12	Second Division	37	0	2	0	39	0
Leeds City	Total		106	3	3	0	109	3
Coventry City	1914–15	Southern League Second Division	18	2	1	0	19	2
Career total			124	5	4	0	128	5
