= Jeff Morris =

Geoff, Geoffrey, Jeffrey, Jefferson or Jeff Morris may refer to:

== Entertainment industry figures ==
- Jeff Morris (actor) (1934–2004), American film and television performer
- Jefferson Morris, American singer; winner of 1958 Metropolitan Opera National Council Auditions#1950s

== Footballers ==
- Geoff Morris (footballer, born 1949) (1949–2015), English left winger during 1960s and 1970s
- Geoff Morris (Australian footballer) (born 1954), coach for West Adelaide during 1990s
- Geoff Morris (rugby league), English left winger during 1970s and 1980s

== Others ==
- Jeff Morris (politician) (born 1964), American member of Washington House of Representatives
