= Lynn Morris (academic) =

South African professor and researcher

Professor Lynn Morris
- Citizenship: South African
- Education: University of Oxford; University of the Witwatersrand
- Occupations: Deputy Vice Chancellor: Research and Innovation
- Employer: University of the Witwatersrand
- Title: Professor

This biography has been updated by WitsEdge, who is employed by the University of the Witwatersrand, Johannesburg. Professor Lynn Morris is a South African scientist, researcher and the Deputy Vice-Chancellor of Research and Innovation at the University of the Witwatersrand in Johannesburg, South Africa. She has had significant involvement in research surrounding antibody response to HIV infection, prevention and vaccination. She has published over 290 journal articles, 10 book chapters, holds an H-index of 70 and has featured in the Web of Science list of highly cited researchers.

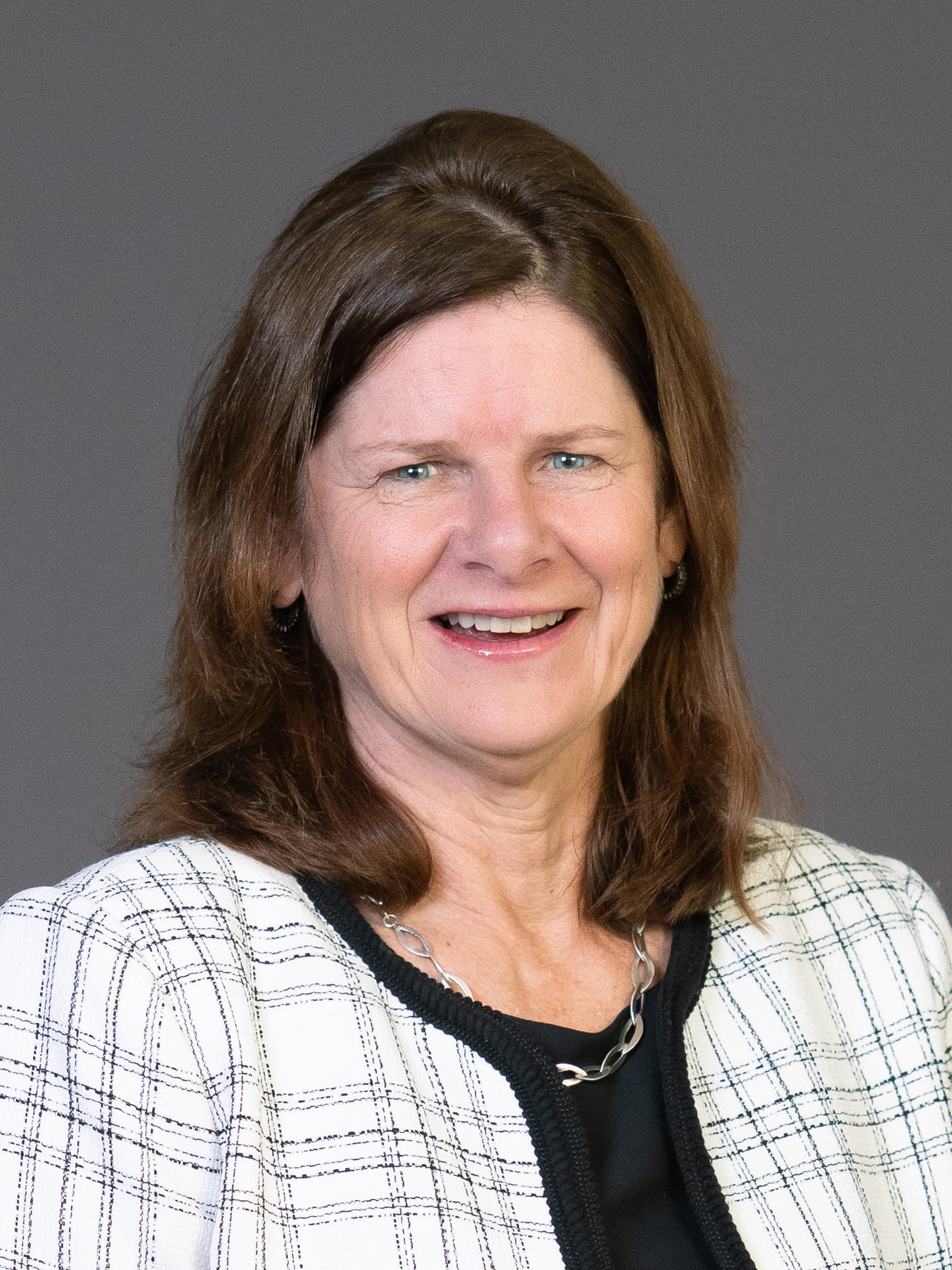

== Education ==
Professor Lynn Morris graduated with a Bachelor of Science degree (BSc) and Masters degree (MSc) in Zoology and Microbiology respectively from the University of the Witwatersrand. She then read for her doctoral degree in Virology and graduated with a DPhil from the Sir William Dunn School of Pathology at the University of Oxford in 1988.

== Career ==
Professor Lynn Morris currently serves as the Deputy Vice-Chancellor: Research and Innovation at the University of the Witwatersrand, Johannesburg, a post that she has held since 2021. In this role she has led established several entities including the Wits Innovation Centre and the Wits Machine Intelligence and Neural Discovery Institute. She also serves on the National Advisory Council on Innovation, the Council of the Academy of Science of South Africa and the boards of the Wits Commercial Enterprise and the Wits Health Consortium.

She also serves as an Honorary Senior Scientist at the Centre for the Aids Programme of Research in South Africa. Prior to this, she worked for approximately three decades at the National Institute for Communicable Diseases, and served for three years as the Interim Director. Notably, her time there coincided with the listeria outbreak of 2017/8 and the Covid-19 pandemic, where she served on several working groups and WHO committees.

She completed her postdoctoral fellowship at the Walter and Eliza Hall Institute of Medical Research in Australia and worked as a visiting scientist at the Aaron Diamond AIDS Research Centre in New York.

== Notable Publications ==
- HIV/AIDS in South Africa Second Edition: Viral structure, replication, tropism, pathogenesis and natural history
- From polio to COVID: Inside story of the NICD
- Differential V2-directed antibody responses in non-human primates infected with SHIVs or immunized with diverse HIV vaccines
- mRNA vaccines offer hope for HIV
- Elicitation of Neutralizing Antibody Responses to HIV-1 Immunization with Nanoparticle Vaccine Platforms
- HIV-1 re-suppression on a first-line regimen despite the presence of phenotypic drug resistance
- Safety and immune responses after a 12-month booster in healthy HIV-uninfected adults in HVTN 100 in South Africa: A randomized double-blind placebo-controlled trial of ALVAC-HIV (vCP2438) and bivalent subtype C gp120/MF59 vaccines
- Neutralization Breadth and Potency of Single-Chain Variable Fragments Derived from Broadly Neutralizing Antibodies Targeting Multiple Epitopes on the HIV-1 Envelope
- Measuring the ability of HIV-specific antibodies to mediate trogocytosis
- Prospects for passive immunity to prevent HIV infection

== Awards and Recognition ==
- Wits Vice-Chancellor's Research Award - 2014
- The World Academy of Sciences Prize in Medical Sciences - 2018
- Member of the Academy of Science of South Africa
- Fellow of the African Academy of Sciences
- Fellow of the Royal Society of South Africa
- Has achieved an A-rating from the National Research Foundation two times.
