= Ieuan Morris =

Welsh artist

Ieuan Morris is a photographic artist, former academic, film director and producer based in Cardiff, South Wales.

== Education ==
Morris is a graduate of Central St Martins College of Art and Design and the Royal College of Art, London.

== Filmmaking ==
Before returning to full-time art practice, Morris combined a career in academia with a career as a filmmaker.

Morris's filmmaking work (on sexuality and politics, based upon ideas of and produced/directed jointly with Ron Moule) was shown in art galleries in New York City, Montreal and the ICA, London and led to joint commissions for programmes on Channel 4, including work developing new work by LGBT filmmakers.

In 2003 Morris wrote and directed Textual @traction, which premiered at the International Festival of New Film in Split, Croatia. Following a world-wide tour of international festivals including the academy-listed Los Angeles International Short Film Festival, the film was given a global television first for an interactive film, when it was broadcast on S4C in January 2006, under its Welsh title Caru T x.

In 2008, Morris' second interactive film Watch Me, used video messaging as part of the film's format. It made the official selection for Strasbourg International Film Festival. It was also in the Official Selection for the Interfilm Berlin International Short Film Festival.

Morris was, until 2014, Reader in Film at the Faculty of Creative and Cultural Industries, University of South Wales, Cardiff. He specialised in screenwriting and directing as well as the study of European and avant-garde cinema.

== Exhibitions & publications ==
-2021: Photographs from the Lockdown Landscape series features in the inaugural Inside the Outside Group's Journal, Right to Roam.

- 2021: Photograph from Brand New Relics included in the Subjectively Objective publication and Detroit gallery group exhibition Everything is Narrative.

- Photographs from Ancient Yews and Corpus Arborae series in group show Arboretum at Lucy Bell Gallery, St Leonards on Sea, East Sussex, February–March 2019.

- Altar, from the series Brand New Relics was selected for the 2017 Royal Academy of Arts Summer Exhibition, Piccadilly, London.

- The series Brand New Relics was short-listed for the 2017 Hariban Award, Kyoto, Japan.

His work has featured in the Black + White Photography Magazine, Artmag and The Guardian

== Awards ==
- 1999: Meanwhile (15mins, 35mm), which he wrote and directed, was nominated for the DM Davies Award at the International Film Festival of Wales, nominated Best Short Film at BAFTA Wales and Best Short Film at the International Crime and Mystery Festival, Courmayeur, Italy.
- Textual @traction, won Best New Media Interactive Award at the Celtic Film Festival and the Welsh Development Agency Focus on Interactive Best Innovation Award.
- Textual @traction was nominated for a BAFTA UK Interactive Award.
- 2008: Watch Me was nominated Best Short Film at the BAFTA Cymru Awards and the Celtic Media Festival; nominated Best Short Screenplay at Strasbourg International Film Festival
- The series Brand New Relics nominated for the 2017 Hariban Award, Kyoto, Japan.
