= Paul Morris =

Paul Morris may refer to:

- Paul Morris (announcer) (1938–2025), Canadian PA announcer for the Toronto Maple Leafs
- Paul Morris (educationalist) (born 1951), educational writer who published an influential work on the Hong Kong School Curriculum in 1998
- Paul Morris (writer) (born 1958), Scottish film writer
- Paul Morris (musician) (born 1959), former keyboardist for Rainbow
- Paul Morris (rugby league, born 1962), Australian rugby league footballer of the 1980s
- Paul Morris (racing driver) (born 1967), Australian V8 Supercar driver
- Paul Morris (footballer, born 1975), English footballer for Bury, see List of Bury F.C. players (1–24 appearances)
- Paul Morris (hurler) (born 1990), Irish hurler
- Paul Morris (producer), American pornography film producer and owner of Treasure Island Media
- Paul Morris (professor), English-born New Zealand religious diversity scholar
- Paul Morris (1990s rugby league), Australian rugby league footballer of the 1990s

== See also ==
- Paul Maurice (born 1967), Canadian ice hockey coach
