= James Morris =

James Morris may refer to:

== Arts ==
- James Morris (artist) (1908–1989), British war artist during the Second World War
- James Morris (bass-baritone) (born 1947), American opera singer
- James Shepherd Morris (1931–2006), Scottish architect, partner in Morris and Steedman
- Jimmy Driftwood (James Corbitt Morris, 1907–1998), American folk music songwriter and musician
- James McGrath Morris (born 1954), American biographer
- Jan Morris (1926–2020), British historian, author and travel writer; formerly known as James Morris
- James Morris (born 1968), British musician with Mephiskapheles, journalist and technology writer

== Military ==
- James Morris III (1752–1820), Revolutionary War officer, coeducation pioneer, namesake of Morris, Connecticut
- James Nicoll Morris (1763–1830), British admiral

== Politics ==
- James Morris (British politician) (born 1967), MP for Halesowen and Rowley Regis
- James Morris (Canada West politician) (1798–1865), Canadian politician and banker
- James Morris (Quebec politician) (1857–1931), farmer, marble and granite dealer and political figure in Quebec
- James R. Morris (1819–1899), U.S. Representative from Ohio
- James Toulmin Morris (1833–1912), South Australian politician
- James Morris (Missouri politician) (born 1962), American politician
- James Morris (North Dakota judge) (1893–1980), North Dakota attorney general
- James Morris (Pennsylvania politician) (1753–1795), American politician and judge
- James Morris (sheriff) (c. 1764–1827), American lawyer and sheriff of New York County
- James Morris (Louisiana politician) (born 1954) American politician

== Sports ==
- Hillbilly Jim (born 1952), retired American professional wrestler whose real name is James Morris
- James Ellsworth (wrestler) (born 1984), American professional wrestler whose real name is James Ellsworth Morris
- James Morris (baseball), 19th-century baseball player
- James Morris (cricketer) (born 1985), English cricketer
- Jamie Morris (born 1965), American football player
- James Morris (American football) (born 1991), American football player
- James Morris (golfer) (1856–1906), Scottish golfer
- James Morris (footballer, born 1864) (1864–?), Welsh footballer
- James Morris (footballer, born 2000), English footballer
- James Morris (footballer, born 2001), English footballer

== Others ==
- James H. Morris (born 1941), American computer scientist
- James Ward Morris (1890–1960), United States federal judge
- James Winston Morris (born 1949), Islamic theologian
- James Craik Morris (1870–1944), bishop of Panama, and of Louisiana
- James Morris (banker), governor of the Bank of England, 1847–1849

== See also ==
- Jim Morris (disambiguation)
- James Morris Gale (1830–1903), civil engineer for the Glasgow Corporation Waterworks
- James Morice (1539–1597), English MP for Colchester
