= Mary Morris Husband =

American nurse

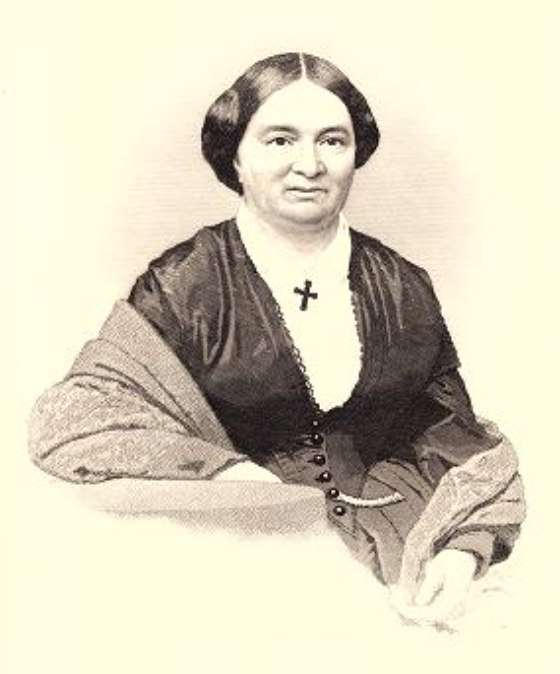
- Born: July 7, 1826; Philadelphia, Pennsylvania
- Died: March 3, 1894 (aged 67)
- Resting place: Laurel Hill Cemetery, Philadelphia, Pennsylvania
- Known for: Civil War nurse
- Spouse: Joshua L. Husband
- Relatives: Robert Morris (grandfather)

Mary Morris Husband (July 7, 1826 – March 3, 1894) was an American nurse during the Civil War (1861–1865). She cared for soldiers who fought at the Battles of Antietam, Chancellorsville, and Gettysburg. She cared for her seriously ill son John until he was discharged by the surgeon. After recovering from miasmatic fever, Husband returned to service. She was among the nurses who treated thousands of soldiers in Fredericksburg, Virginia following the Battles of the Wilderness and Spotsylvania Court House (May 1864). She nursed at the White House Hospital in June 1864. Among other leadership positions, she was the matron of the Third Corps hospital.

== Personal life ==
Mary Morris was born July 7, 1826, in Philadelphia. She was the daughter of Eliza Jane (née Smith) and Henry Morris. Robert Morris, known as the "Financier of the Revolution" and a Founding Father, was her grandfather.

Morris married lawyer Joshua L. Husband, becoming Mary Morris Husband. They had two sons, John served in Company C, 72nd Pennsylvania Infantry Regiment and Henry served during the Civil War, first for 30 days with the 23rd Pennsylvania Infantry Regiment, but he was a deserter throughout the war, which caused Husband to contact the Secretary of War and the White House on his behalf.

== Civil War nurse ==
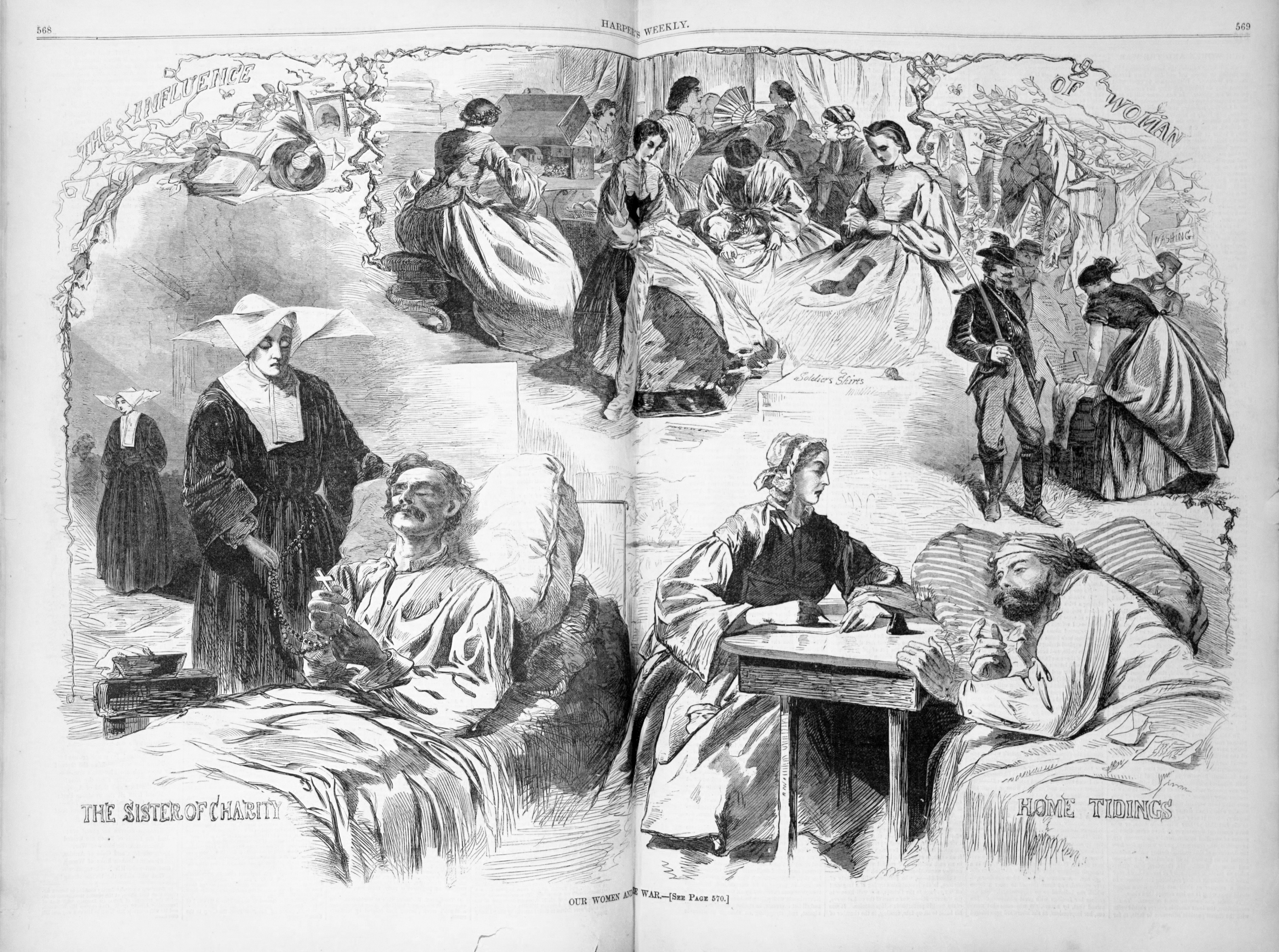
Winslow Homer, "Our Women and the War", Civil War nurses, Harper's Weekly, September 6, 1862

In 1861 or 1862, Husband served as a member of the Ladies' Aid Society at a Philadelphia hospital. She prepared special dietary food, dressed wounds, and otherwise cared for soldiers until July 1862. Husband was known for providing reading material, games, and fruit to her patients. She had her own health problems, but it made her anxious to think about soldiers needing her help, so she became a war nurse.

Husband worked in hospital transports, first at Harrison's Landing. More men died of serious illnesses, like malaria, than from wounds. This was due to disease being spread though the camps, fatigue, heat, not enough food, depression, and over-marching. To help the soldiers recover, Husband spent much of her time ensuring that the soldiers had restorative diets. About the time that Husband was at Harrison's Landing, she learned her son John was gravely ill after fighting in Richmond. She cared for him, while caring for other soldiers, but John did not recover and was discharged September 28, 1862, by the surgeon. Husband continued to travel with the Union Army to care for soldiers. Like Mary Ann Bickerdyke, Clara Barton, and other female nurses, she had difficulty gaining access to the battlefields. Male doctors were preferred. Husband did get onto battlefields, though, where she dressed wounds into the night, slept in the ambulance, and began again in the morning.

She cared for soldiers in New York, where she was the Lady Superintendent by 1863. Dorothea Dix promoted her to the temporary head of Camden Street Hospital in Baltimore while the matron was on medical leave. After a few weeks, she worked at the Smoketown Hospital with Maria M. C. Hall, caring for soldiers who fought atf the Battle of Antietam (September 17, 1862).

She traveled to care for soldiers, particularly with the Third Division of the Third Corps. She nursed soldiers of the Battle of Chancellorsville (April 30 – May 6, 1863) and at Camp Letterman for the Battle of Gettysburg (July 1 – 3, 1863). A surgeon of the 11th Regiment Massachusetts Volunteers said of her work on the battlefield, "[Husband] was kind, faithful, and skillful in her management of the wounded, unremitting in her labors, sparing herself neither night or day whenever there was anything she could do to relieve the sufferings of the wounded and sick." Husband was taken back to Philadelphia after she became ill with miasmatic fever.

Husband returned to service after she recovered and was the matron of the Third Corps hospital. She was among the nurses who treated thousands of soldiers in Fredericksburg, Virginia following the Battles of the Wilderness and Spotsylvania Court House (May 1864). She served at the White House Hospital in June 1864. Husband managed military diet kitchens in City Point, Virginia until the Fall of Richmond (April 1865).

== Later years and death ==
Husband and Joshua lived in Florida on an orange plantation in their later years. Joshua died in 1881. The couple had financial reverses and Husband had to support herself. She lived in Washington, D.C. by 1883 and worked at a pension office. An Act of Congress provided her with a pension of $25 (equivalent to $875 in 2024) the following year.

Husband died March 3, 1894. She is buried at the Laurel Hill Cemetery in Philadelphia.CITEREFGAR_Civil_War_Museum2020 Her gravestone mentions her service during the war.

== Bibliography ==
- Brockett, L. P.; Vaughan, Mary C. (1867). Woman's work in the Civil War : a record of heroism, patriotism and patience. Zeigler, McCurdy.
- "Collective Biographies of Women: Mary Morris Husband". cbw.iath.virginia.edu.
- Conklin, Eileen (2013). Women at Gettysburg 1863 Revisited. Thomas Publications. pp. 204–211. ISBN 978-1-57747-174-5.
- "GAR Civil War Museum Receives $50,000 Gift". Civil War Roundtable of Eastern PA, Inc. November 21, 2020.
- Lindberg, Melissa (2019). "Research Guides: Civil War Men and Women: Glimpses of Their Lives Through Photography: Mary Morris Husband". guides.loc.gov.
- Lockwood, Mary S. (1895). Lineage book of the charter members of the Daughters of the American Revolution (PDF). Harrisburg Publishing Company. p. 44.
