= Tricia Derges =

American politician

Member of the Missouri House of Representatives from the 140th district
- In office January 6, 2021 – July 1, 2022
- Preceded by: Lynn Morris
- Succeeded by: Jamie Gragg

Personal details
- Born: Giddings, Texas, U.S.
- Party: Republican

Tricia Derges is an American politician. She served as a Republican member for the 140th district of the Missouri House of Representatives.

Born in Giddings, Texas. Derges attended at the Kirkwood High School. In 2021, she won the election for the 140th district of the Missouri House of Representatives. Derges succeeded politician, Lynn Morris. In 2022, she was resigned from her 140th district office for which Derges was considered guilty after being convicted on federal corruption charges.
