= Margaret Morris =

Margaret Morris may refer to:

- Margaret Morris (actress) (1898–1968), American actress
- Margaret Morris (dancer) (1891–1980), British dancer
- Maggie Morris (1925–2014), Canadian radio and television personality of the 1960s
- Margie Morris (1892–1983), Anglo-Dutch performer
- Margaret Hill Morris (1737–1816), American Quaker healer and diarist

== See also ==
- Margaretta Morris (1797–1867), American entomologist
