= Alexander Morris (cricketer) =

New Zealand cricketer

Personal information
- Born: 14 November 1858; Dunedin, Otago, New Zealand
- Died: 1 April 1918 (aged 59); Dunedin, Otago, New Zealand

Domestic team information
- Years: Team
- 1884/85: Otago
- Source: ESPNcricinfo, 18 May 2016

Alexander Morris (14 November 1858 – 1 April 1918) was a New Zealand sportsman. He played one first-class cricket match for Otago during the 1884–85 season.

Morris was born at Dunedin in 1858 and educated at Otago Boys' High School. He worked in the banking industry, joining the Colonial Bank of New Zealand soon after it was established at Dunedin in 1874. He managed the bank's office at Lawrence and stayed in post when the bank was amalgamated into the Bank of New Zealand in 1895 before being promoted to manage the office at Invercargill. He was later promoted to become an inspector for the bank, initially visiting a range of branches before taking up the position of resident inspector at Wellington.

A rugby union player for Dunedin and a cricketer, Morris made his only first-class cricket appearance for Otago in a match against Auckland played at Lancaster Park in Christchurch over the New Years period in 1884–85. He scored two runs and did not take a wicket in the match.

Morris was married and had three children. He died at Dunedin in 1918 whilst still in post with the Bank of New Zealand, although he had been on sick leave for a period of months. He was aged 59.
