= Frances Morris =

Frances Morris may refer to:

- Frances Morris (actress) (1908–2003), American actress
- Frances Morris (gallerist) (born 1959), director of the Tate Modern

== See also ==
- Francis Morris (disambiguation) for male version of the name
