= Ian Morris =

Ian Morris may refer to:

- Ian Morris (musician) (1957–2010), New Zealand musician
- Ian Morris (historian) (born 1960), Willard Professor of Classics at Stanford University
- Ian Morris (athlete) (born 1961), Trinidadian athlete
- Ian Morris (footballer) (born 1987), Irish footballer
- Ian Morris (cricketer) (born 1946), Welsh cricketer
- Ian Morris (writer and podcaster) (born 1978), Writer and Podcaster
