= Anne Morris =

Anne Morris may refer to:

- Anne Marie Morris (born 1957), British politician
- Anne Morris, camogie player in All-Ireland Senior Club Camogie Championship 1985
- Annie Morris (born 1978), British artist
- Ann Axtell Morris (1900–1945), American archaeologist, artist, and author
- Ann Orr Morris (1924–1987), American silversmith, goldsmith, and enamelist

== See also ==
- Ann Cody (Ann Cody-Morris; born 1963), American Paralympic athlete
- Anna Mercedes Morris (born 1978), Hollywood stuntwoman and actress
