= Edmund Morris =

Edmund Morris may refer to:

- Edmund Morris (MP for Leominster) (fl. 1410)
- Edmund Morris (writer) (1940–2019), biographer of US presidents Reagan and Theodore Roosevelt
- Edmund Morris (MP for Leicestershire) (c. 1686–1759), English politician
- Edmund L. Morris (1923–2003), Canadian Member of Parliament for Halifax riding
- Edmund Finucane Morris (1792–1871), British Army officer
- Edmund Montague Morris (1871–1913), Canadian painter
