= Kenneth Morris =

Kenneth Morris is the name of:

- Kenneth Morris (author) (1879–1937), Welsh author and theosophist
- Kenneth Morris (politician) (1903–1978), Australian politician
- Kenny Morris (drummer) (1957–2026), drummer with Siouxsie and the Banshees
- Kenny Morris (EastEnders), fictional character
- Kenneth Morris (composer) (1917–1988), African American gospel composer

== See also ==
- Ken Morris (born 1942), American Olympic bobsledder
