= Patrick John Morris =

Patrick Morris
- Also known as: Mister P.
- Born: Patrick John Morris; 13 April 1948; Highgate, London, England
- Died: 16 January 2008 (aged 59) Highgate, London, England
- Occupations: Composer, musician, songwriter
- Instruments: Piano, vocals
- Years active: 1969–2008

Patrick John Morris (13 April 1948 – 16 January 2008) was a British composer, musician, and songwriter.

Disillusioned with contemporary classical music in the style of Stockhausen and Boulez, he developed a style that one critic, Jonathan Wiltshire, has called "residual", a label he accepted. He described his main musical influences as Erik Satie and Brian Eno, whom he rated as the most important composers of the twentieth century. His style is associated with that of his contemporary Howard Skempton and has been compared to younger composer Simon Rackham, who released a piece for two pianos called 'Warhorse' dedicated to the memory of Patrick Morris on his 2011 album, Once In a Blue Moonlight.

He placed his works into three groups, piano music, instrumental pieces and songs. For the songs he set poems to music and sang them, verses by A. E. Housman, W. E. Henley, Walter de la Mare and other well-known poets, and particularly the Australian-born poet Vicki Raymond.

He also wrote the soundtrack for a number of arthouse films, including the documentary, LuXus, about abstract painter Philip Diggle.
