= Mary Morris (diarist) =

Irish nurse and writer

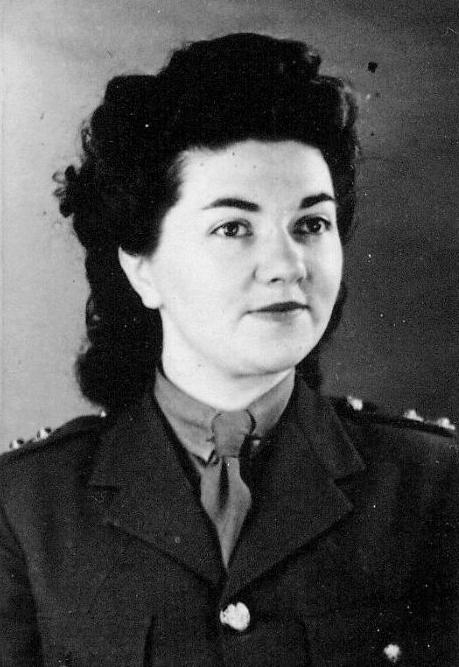
- Mary Morris in uniform, 1946
- Born: Mary Ellen Mulry; 15 February 1921; County Galway, Ireland
- Died: 1997 (aged 75–76); Llandogo, Wales
- Occupations: Nurse, writer

Mary Ellen Morris (née Mulry; 15 February 1921 – 1997) was an Irish nurse and writer, known for her war diaries during the Second World War. These are stored at the Imperial War Museum and in June 2014 were published under the title 'A Very Private Diary', a reference to one diary entry: "15 June 1944, Bognor Regis: Should have headed this 'Somewhere in Southern England' but this is a very private diary..."

She was born in County Galway, Ireland and left her home at the age of 18, after passing the examination to train at Guy's Hospital in London as a nurse probationer. After training, she was transferred to Kent. Her diaries start here with the arrival of survivors from the Dunkirk evacuation, and subsequently, injured pilots from the Battle of Britain. Here she also underwent training in fever nursing, a specialisation prior to antibiotics when whooping cough and diphtheria were fatal. Working at the 'home front' during The Blitz, she spent many nights moving very ill children and babies from their beds to safer underground shelters.

Despite the wishes of her matron, she enlisted with the Queen Alexandra's Imperial Military Nursing Service Reserves, known as the QAs. It is with the QAs that she is dispatched to Normandy on a troopship on 18 June, 12 days after D-Day. The field hospital follows the troops into Belgium, where she cares for survivors of the disastrous assault on Arnhem, and then later into Germany. During her active service in Belgium she met her future husband, Malcolm Morris, in 1945. The diary ends in 1947 with the birth of their son, Michael.

== Books ==
- Morris, Mary (12 June 2014). A Very Private Diary. UK: orionbooks. ISBN 9780297871552. Archived from the original on 5 August 2014.
