= Keith Morris (disambiguation) =

Keith Morris (born 1955) is the co-founder and former lead singer of the punk rock bands Black Flag and Circle Jerks.

Keith Morris may also refer to:

- Keith Morris (photographer) (1938–2005), British rock photographer
- Keith Morris (musician) (died 2005), British jazz musician and composer
- Keith Alan Morris (born 1972), American writer/film director
- Keith Lee Morris, American author
- Keith Morris (diplomat) (born 1934), former British ambassador to Colombia
