= Anthony Morris =

Anthony Morris may refer to:

- Anthony Morris (I) (1654–1721), also known as Anthony Morris Jr., early mayor of colonial Philadelphia
- Anthony Morris (II) (1682–1763), also known as Anthony Morris III, son of earlier mayor, and himself mayor of Philadelphia
- Anthony Morris III, member of the Governing Body of Jehovah's Witnesses (2005–2023)
- Anthony Morris (American football) (born 1992), Canadian football offensive guard

== See also ==
- Tony Morris (1962–2020), British newsreader for ITV Granada Reports
- Anthony Moris, Luxembourg footballer
- Tony Morris, head of American Maglev Technology
