= Alexander B. Morrison =

Canadian scientist, academic, and public servant

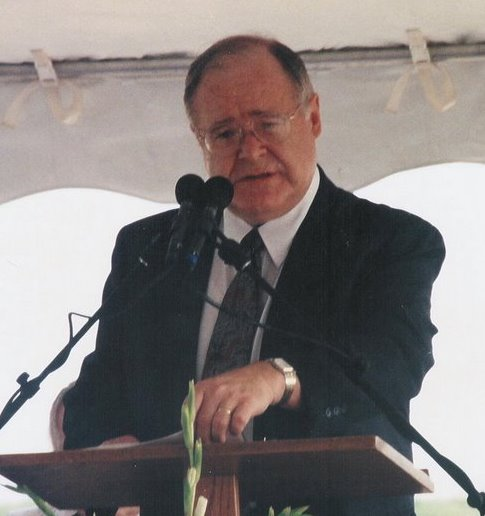

First Quorum of the Seventy
- 4 April 1987 – 1 April 1989
- Called by: Ezra Taft Benson
- End reason: Transferred to Second Quorum of the Seventy

Second Quorum of the Seventy
- 1 April 1989 – 6 April 1991
- Called by: Ezra Taft Benson
- End reason: Transferred to First Quorum of the Seventy

First Quorum of the Seventy
- 6 April 1991 – 7 October 2000
- Called by: Ezra Taft Benson
- End reason: Granted general authority emeritus status

Emeritus General Authority
- 7 October 2000 – 12 February 2018
- Called by: Gordon B. Hinckley

Personal details
- Born: Alexander Baillie Morrison; December 22, 1930; Edmonton, Alberta, Canada
- Died: February 12, 2018 (aged 87); Bountiful, Utah, U.S.
- Alma mater: University of Michigan
- Spouse(s): Shirley Brooks
- Children: 8

Alexander Baillie Morrison (22 December 1930 – 12 February 2018) was a Canadian scientist, academic, and public servant and was a general authority of the Church of Jesus Christ of Latter-day Saints (LDS Church) from 1987 until his death.

== Professional life ==
Born in Edmonton, Alberta, Canada, Morrison gained degrees in nutrition and pharmacology from the University of Alberta and Cornell University. He was an academic at the University of Guelph in Ontario and was chair of the Scientific and Technical Advisory Committee to the Special Program for Research and Training in Tropical Diseases in the World Health Organization. In 1984, Morrison was the recipient of the David M. Kennedy International Service Award from the Kennedy International Center at Brigham Young University. Morrison was also an Assistant Deputy Minister, Health Protection Branch with Health Canada and oversaw issues of environmental, drug and food safety.

== LDS Church service ==
During his time as a student at the University of Alberta, Morrison was baptized into the LDS Church after being introduced to Mormonism by a friend. At the time, Morrison's branch president was N. Eldon Tanner and his Sunday School instructor was Hugh B. Brown.

Morrison had previously served in the church as a branch president, bishop, and regional representative. In 1987, Morrison became a member of the church's First Quorum of the Seventy. In 1989, Morrison was transferred to the newly created Second Quorum of the Seventy, but was returned to the First Quorum in 1991. He served as a general authority until 2000, when he was designated as an emeritus general authority.

Morrison was the author of seven books on topics related to Mormonism and had become one of Mormonism's foremost voices on the plight of the mentally ill.

Morrison and his wife are the parents of eight children.

Morrison died at his home in Bountiful, Utah on February 12, 2018.

== Publications ==
- Alexander B. Morrison (1990). The Dawning of a Brighter Day: The Church in Black Africa (Salt Lake City: Deseret Book) ISBN 0-87579-338-X
- —— (1992). Feed My Sheep: Leadership Ideas for Latter-day Saint Shepherds (Salt Lake City: Deseret Book) ISBN 0-87579-605-2
- —— (2003). His Name Be Praised: Understanding Christ's Ministry and Mission (Salt Lake City: Deseret Book) ISBN 1-57008-768-7
- —— (2005). Turning From Truth: A New Look at the Great Apostasy (Salt Lake City: Deseret Book) ISBN 1-59038-395-8
- —— (2003). Valley of Sorrow: A Layman's Guide to Understanding Mental Illness for Latter-day Saints (Salt Lake City: Deseret Book) ISBN 1-59038-087-8
- —— (1993). Visions of Zion (Salt Lake City: Deseret Book) ISBN 0-87579-788-1
- —— (1997). Zion: A Light in the Darkness (Salt Lake City: Deseret Book) ISBN 1-57345-260-2
