= Frank Morris =

Frank Morris may refer to:

- Frank Morris (Canadian football) (1923–2009), Canadian football lineman
- Frank Morris (speedcuber) (born 1981), American competitive speedcuber
- Frank Morris (prisoner) (1926–1962?), Alcatraz escapee

== See also ==
- Frank Morriss (1927–2013), American film and television editor
