= Aaron Morris =

Aaron Morris may refer to:

- Aaron Morris (footballer) (born 1989), Welsh professional footballer
- Aaron Morris (rugby union) (born 1995), English professional rugby union player
