= Edwin Morris =

Edwin Morris may refer to:

- Edwin Morris (British Army officer) (1889–1970), British Army General
- Edwin Morris (bishop) (1894–1971), Bishop of Monmouth and Archbishop of Wales
