= Betty Sue Morris =

American politician

Member of the Washington House of Representatives from the 18th district
- In office 1989 – May 13, 1996

Personal details
- Party: Democratic
- Education: University of Portland
- Alma mater: University of Missouri; Portland State University

Betty Sue Morris is an American politician. She was a Democrat, representing District 18 in the Washington House of Representatives which included northern Clark County, eastern Cowlitz County and southern Lewis County, from 1989 to 1996. She was a former Clark County commissioner. Morris is a graduate of the University of Missouri with an Master of Education from Portland State University.
