= George Morris (footballer) =

English footballer

Personal information
- Date of birth: 1879
- Place of birth: Manchester, England
- Position: Left half

Senior career*
Years	Team	Apps	(Gls)
–	Manchester St Augustine's		
1897–1899	Lincoln City	66	(4)
1899–1900	Glossop	14	(0)
1900–1901	Barnsley	23	(1)
–	Millwall Athletic		
- * Club domestic league appearances and goals

George R. Morris (1874 – after 1902) was an English footballer who made 103 appearances in the Football League playing for Lincoln City, Glossop and Barnsley. He played as a left half. He also played in the Southern League for Millwall Athletic.
