= Wayne Morris (disambiguation) =

Wayne Morris (1914–1959) was an American film and television actor.

Wayne Morris may also refer to:

- Wayne Morris (Australian footballer) (born 1947), played with South Melbourne in VFL
- Wayne Morris (American football) (born 1954), running back with Cardinals and Chargers
- Wayne Morris (English actor) (born 1964), stage name since 2000 has been Adam Morris

== See also ==
- Wayne Morse (1900–1974), United States senator from Oregon
