= Lynn Morris (politician) =

American politician

Member of the Missouri House of Representatives from the 140th district
- In office 2013–2020
- Succeeded by: Tricia Derges

Personal details
- Born: January 22, 1949 (age 77) West Plains, Missouri
- Party: Republican
- Spouse: Janet
- Children: 3
- Profession: businessman, executive

Lynn Morris (born January 22, 1949) is an American politician. He was a member of the Missouri House of Representatives, having served between 2013 and 2020. He is a member of the Republican Party. Morris was term-limited and left office at the conclusion of the 2020 legislative session.
