= W. Allen Morris =

American businessman

- Occupations: Chairman and CEO
- Known for: Allen Morris Company
- Parent(s): Ida Akers Morris; L. Allen Morris

W. Allen Morris is Chairman and CEO of the Allen Morris Company and a real estate developer and Realtor in the state of Florida.

== Early life and education ==
Morris is the son of Ida (née Akers) and L. Allen Morris. His father founded the Allen Morris Company and after his retirement was active in Christian causes. Morris is a graduate of the Georgia Institute of Technology and Harvard Business School. He holds the Certified Property Manager designation of the Institute of Real Estate Management and the Society of Industrial and Office Realtors (SIOR). He also holds the Counselor of Real Estate (CRE) designation of the American Society of Real Estate Counselors and is a Fellow of the Royal Institution of Chartered Surveyors.

== Positions held ==
Morris is an officer and director of more than thirty-five different real estate-related companies and president of three charitable foundations. He was past chairman and is a current advisory board member of Wachovia Bank of Miami.

Allen Morris is a Rotarian, a former chairman of the Florida Chapter of the Young Presidents' Organization, a current member of the Chief Executives Organization and World Presidents' Organization, and a lifetime senior member of the Orange Bowl Committee. He is a past president of the Miami Club, has served on the National Board of Directors of the Boys & Girls Clubs of America, the board of directors of the Florida Association of Realtors, the Miami Board of Realtors, and many local philanthropic boards. He is a past president of the Florida chapter of the Certified Commercial Investment Members of the Realtors National Marketing Institute.

== Awards ==
Allen Morris was presented with the American Management Association Award at the Georgia Institute of Technology for Excellence as the top student in Marketing and Management studies.

He was awarded the Institute of Human Relations Award given by the American Jewish Committee and the Hickok Award given by the Young Presidents Organization. He has received numerous professional distinctions including the 2009 Business Leader of the Year Award in Real Estate from the South Florida Business Leader Magazine, the 2011 Real Estate Trend Setter REAL Award from the Greater Miami Chamber of Commerce and the 2014 Business Leader of the Year by the Coral Gables Chamber of Commerce.

== The Allen Morris Company ==
The Allen Morris Company is a developer and manager of office buildings in the State of Florida. With offices in Miami, Fort Lauderdale, Orlando, Jacksonville and Atlanta, the Allen Morris Company brokers, leases, and manages numerous properties all over Florida.

The Allen Morris Company has completed 79 developments and currently has two projects under construction: the 1.3 million square foot, 58-story luxury hotel and condominium - SLS LUX Brickell - a joint venture with Related Group, and the 347-unit, Hermitage Apartment Homes in St. Petersburg, Florida. The company just announced its newest project, Maitland City Centre, creating a new mixed-use downtown for the City of Maitland, Florida, combining the new City Hall, Central Park and Festival Street with residential apartments, live-work-office suites, and a Festival Marketplace with shops and restaurants. The company will soon announce another mixed-used, urban project in midtown Atlanta later this year.

Their latest Class "A" office building project, a Mediterranean Revival style office building called the Alhambra Towers in Coral Gables, Florida, has won nine awards including "The Best of South Florida Platinum Awards", "NAIOP 2003 Project of the Year - all categories", and Florida's "2006 Community Advancement Award for Commercial Project of the Year" awarded by the Developers and Builders Alliance.

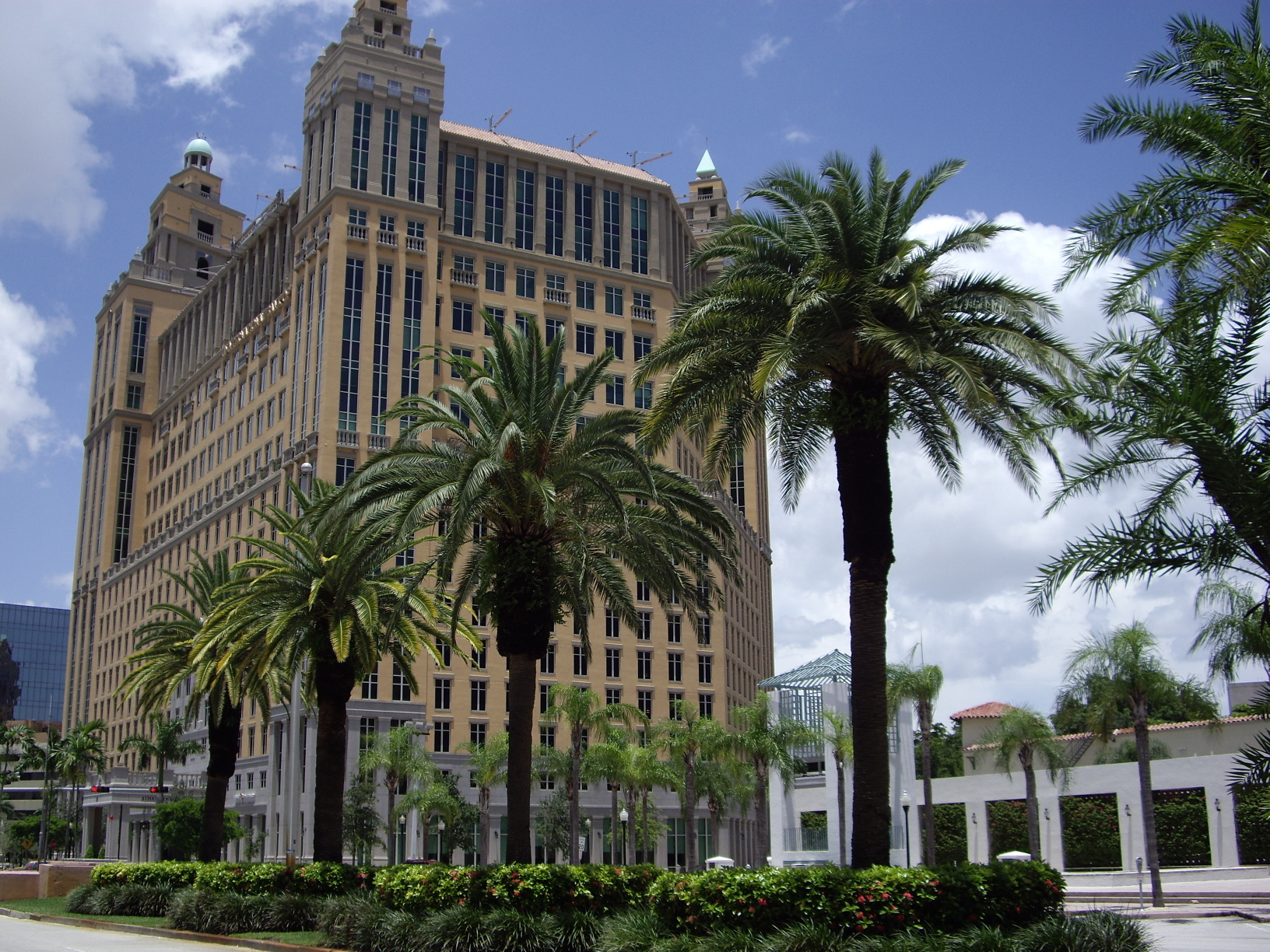
Alhambra Towers
