= Mike Morris =

Mike Morris may refer to:

== Sports ==
- Mike Morris (long snapper) (born 1961), former American football player
- Mike Morris (defensive end) (born 2001), American football defensive end
- Mike Morris (ice hockey) (born 1983), American professional ice hockey forward

== Others ==
- Mike Morris (orchestrator), Tony Award winner in the category Best Orchestrations
- Mike Morris (physicist), physics professor at Butler University
- Mike Morris (TV presenter) (1946–2012), British television presenter
- Mike Morris (politician), Minister of Public Safety and Solicitor General of British Columbia
- Mike Morris, singer of Faith No Man, an early incarnation of Faith No More

== See also ==
- Michael Morris (disambiguation)
