= Darryl Morris =

Darryl or Darrell Morris may refer to:

- Darryl Morris (American football) (born 1990), American football cornerback
- Darryl Morris (presenter) (born 1990), radio presenter
- Darryl Morris (Charmed), a character in the TV series
