= Alan Morris =

Alan Morris may refer to:

- Alan Morris (cricketer) (born 1953), English cricketer
- Alan Morris (footballer) (1954–1998), English footballer
- Alan Morris (advertiser) (1942–2007), Australian advertising creative executive

== See also ==
- Allan Morris (disambiguation)
- Allen Morris (disambiguation)
