= Peter Morris =

Peter Morris may refer to:

- Peter Morris (Australian footballer) (1933–2024), Australian rules footballer for Richmond
- Peter Morris (baseball) (1854–1884), Welsh baseball player
- Peter Morris (cricketer) (born 1937), New Zealand cricketer
- Peter Morris (English footballer) (born 1943), English football player and manager
- Peter Morris (ice hockey) (born 1955), WHA ice hockey player
- Peter Morris (playwright) (born 1973), American playwright, television writer and critic
- Peter Morris (politician) (1932–2026), Australian politician
- Peter Morris (surgeon) (1934–2022), transplant surgeon born in Australia
- Peter Morris (swimmer) (born 1961), British Olympic swimmer
- Peter Morris (writer) (born 1962), 1991 Scrabble World Champion and baseball historian

== See also ==
- Peter Morice (died 1588), Dutch-born engineer
- Peter Maurice (disambiguation)
- Peter Temple-Morris (1938–2018), British politician
