= Jenny Morris (environmental health) =

British Environmental Health Officer

Jenny Morris MBE
- Citizenship: British
- Education: King's College London; University of Birmingham
- Known for: food safety
- Awards: Member of the Most Excellent Order of the British Empire
- Scientific career
- Fields: Environmental Health
- Workplaces: Chartered Institute of Environmental Health

Jenny Morris MBE is a British practitioner of environmental health and an advocate for food safety. She is best known for her leadership promoting food safety during the 2012 Summer Olympics in London. Morris led the establishment of The Institute of Food Safety, Integrity, and Protection (TiFSiP) as part of the Chartered Institute of Environmental Health. Morris is a Chartered Fellow of the CIEH, and a Fellow of the Royal Society for Public Health. In 2014, and she was invested as a Member of the Most Excellent Order of the British Empire in recognition of her services to environmental health.

== Life ==
Jenny Morris is a British practitioner of environmental health and an advocate for food safety. She is best known for her leadership promoting food safety during the 2012 Summer Olympics in London.

Morris began her career as an Environmental Health Officer in Royal Borough Windsor and Maidenhead in 2000. In 2014, she led the establishment of The Institute of Food Safety, Integrity, and Protection (TiFSiP) as part of the Chartered Institute of Environmental Health. She is also a qualified chef and food safety trainer.

Morris received her Bachelor of Sciences in Environmental Health in 1997 from King's College London. She received her Masters of Science in Food Safety in 2002 from the University of Birmingham, and in 2007 she received her Masters of Business Administration with a focus in public service from the same institution. Morris is a Chartered Fellow of the CIEH, and a Fellow of the Royal Society for Public Health. In 2014, she was invested as a Member of the Most Excellent Order of the British Empire, in recognition of her services to environmental health.
