= Raymond Morris =

Raymond Morris may refer to:

- Raymond Leslie Morris, convicted child murderer and rapist
- Raymond Morris (cricketer) (1929–2017)
- Raymond Vincent Morris (1889–1943), member of the Early Birds of Aviation
