= Hugh Morris (footballer, born 1900) =

Scottish footballer

Personal information
- Date of birth: 19 November 1900
- Place of birth: Giffnock, Scotland
- Date of death: 1965 (aged 64–65)
- Height: 5 ft 6 1/2 in (1.69 m)
- Position: Outside right

Youth career
- Hardgate Boys Club

Senior career*
Years	Team	Apps	(Gls)
–	Rutherglen Glencairn		
1915–1922	Clyde	188	(19)
1922–1924	Manchester City	57	(0)
1924–1925	Nottingham Forest	22	(1)
1925	Notts County	0	(0)
1925–1929	Southend United	117	(14)
1929–1930	Newport County	22	(5)
Total		406	(39)
- * Club domestic league appearances and goals

Hugh Morris (19 November 1900 – 1965) was a Scottish footballer who played as an outside right for Clyde, Manchester City, Nottingham Forest, Notts County, Southend United and Newport County.
