= Benjamin Morris =

Benjamin Morris may refer to:

- Benjamin Wistar Morris (colonist) (1762–1825), founder of Wellsboro, Pennsylvania
- Benjamin Wistar Morris (bishop) (1819–1906), second Bishop of the Episcopal Diocese of Oregon
- Benjamin Wistar Morris (architect) (1870–1944), American architect from Oregon who worked primarily in New York City
- Benny Morris (born 1948), Israeli professor
- Ben Morris (special effects artist), special effects artist
- Ben Morris (footballer) (born 1999), English footballer
- Ben Morris (rugby league) (born 1997), Wales rugby league international
- Ben Morris (cricketer) (born 2003), Welsh cricketer
- B. W. Morris, American politician and teacher
