= Nicholas Morris =

Nicholas or Nick Morris or Morys may refer to:

- Nick Morris (director), British music video director
- Nick Morris (basketball) (born 1971)
- Nicholas Morys, English politician, MP for Cambridgeshire
- Nicholas Morris (politician), Trinidad and Tobago politician
- Nicolas Morice (1774–1848), navy officer
- Nick Morris (speedway rider) (born 1994), Australian racer

== See also ==
- Nicky Morris (born 1962), English middle and long-distance runner
- Nicola Morris (born 1967), New Zealand Olympic judoka
