= Alex J. Morrison =

Alex Morrison was an American golf instructor. His students include Henry Picard who taught Jack Grout who was Jack Nicklaus’s enduring coach and mentor. Morrison was one of four brothers who were all golf professionals in the 1920s, 1930s, 1940s and 1950s. Morrison's teachings are credited with helping many golfers reduce their handicap.

Morrison is mentioned in Bob Hope's Confessions of a Hooker; My Lifelong Love Affair With Golf, First 100 Years; Golf in America, and Golf In the Ozarks.

Morrison was one of the first to use high-speed photographs to analyze golf swings from all possible angles. Through this analysis, Morrison was able to develop the "Morrison Swing".

Morrison wrote two books that are now out of print; one of which introduced the concept of centrifugal force in golf swings. His other book called Better Golf Without Practice contained instruction on visualization techniques.

The adoption of the Morrison swing pattern helped to bring about an improvement in scoring in major tournaments during the 1930s, 1940s and 1950s. His methods have influenced many modern golf instructors.
