= Robert Morris =

Robert Morris or Bob Morris may refer to:

== Politics and the law ==
- Robert Hunter Morris (1700–1764), lieutenant governor of Colonial Pennsylvania
- Robert Morris (financier) (1734–1806), one of the Founding Fathers of the United States, merchant and politician
  - Robert Morris University, university in Pittsburgh named after him
  - Robert Morris University Illinois, former university in Chicago named after him
  - Robert Morris (Bartlett), a statue of him by Paul Wayland Bartlett
- Robert Morris (judge) (1745–1815), American federal judge
- Robert Morris (MP) (died 1816), English politician
- Robert H. Morris (mayor) (1808–1855), mayor of New York City
- Robert Morris (lawyer) (1823–1882), early African-American attorney
- Page Morris (Robert Page Waller Morris, 1853–1924), U.S. representative from Minnesota
- Robert J. Morris (1914–1996), anti-Communist crusader, lawyer and politician
- Robert Morris (Denver mayor) (1838–1917), mayor of Denver, Colorado
- Robert Morris (Indiana politician), member of the Indiana House of Representatives
- Robbie Morris (politician) (born 1982/1983), member of the West Virginia Senate

== Arts and entertainment ==
- Robert Morris (British writer) (1703–1754), English writer on architecture
- Robert Morris (artist) (1931–2018), American contemporary artist
- Robert Morris (actor) (born 1940), British actor
- Robert Morris (composer) (born 1943), British-American composer
- Bob Morris (writer) (born 1950), American author
- Colonel Robert Morris (1954–2013), American musician
- Bob Morris (musician) (born 1985), songwriter, singer, and guitarist of Stamps
- Robert Lee Morris (born 1947), German-born jewelry designer
- Robert Michael Morris (1940–2017), American actor

== Sports ==
- Robert Morris (Welsh footballer) (1875–1926), Welsh international footballer
- Robert Morris (basketball) (1902–1986), collegiate and professional basketball head coach
- Robert Morris (English footballer) (1913–?), English footballer
- Robert Morris (cricketer) (1926–2007), Welsh cricketer
- Bob Morris (racing driver) (born 1948), touring car racer, winner of 1976 Bathurst 1000
- Rob Morris (American football) (born 1975), American retired football linebacker
- Robbie Morris (born 1982), English rugby union player
- Bob Morris (football manager) (died 2026), Papua New Guinean football manager

== Other fields ==
- Robert Murray Morris (1824–1896), officer in the U.S. Army and Union Army
- Robert Tuttle Morris (1857–1945), American surgeon
- Robert Schofield Morris (1898–1964), Canadian architect
- Robert Morris (cryptographer) (1932–2011), American cryptographer and former chief scientist of the National Security Agency
- Robert L. Morris (1942–2004), first holder of the Koestler Chair of Parapsychology at the University of Edinburgh
- Robert Morris (historian) (1943–2022), English historian
- Robert Morris (pastor) (born 1961), American disgraced former pastor, televangelist and founder of Gateway Church
- Robert Tappan Morris (born 1965), son of the cryptographer, creator of the first Internet worm
- Robert Morris (mathematician), 21st century mathematician

== See also ==
- Rob Morris (disambiguation)
- Robert Morris-Nunn (born 1949), Australian architect
- Bert Morris (disambiguation)
