= Martin Morris =

Martin Morris may refer to:

- Martin Ferdinand Morris (1834–1909), American lawyer
- Martin Morris, 2nd Baron Killanin (1867–1927), Irish Conservative Member of Parliament
