= Holly Morris =

Holly Morris may refer to:

- Holly Morris (author) (born 1965), author, television producer, and correspondent
- Holly Morris (television reporter), Washington, D.C. television reporter
