= Lewis Morris (disambiguation) =

Lewis Morris (1726–1798) was a signer of the United States Declaration of Independence.

Lewis Morris may also refer to:

- Lewis Morris (governor) (1671–1746), American colonial leader in New York and New Jersey
- Lewis Morris (speaker) (1698–1762), American judge, politician and landowner
- Lewis Morris (1701–1765), Welsh poet
- Lewis R. Morris (1760–1825), U.S. Representative from Vermont
- Lewis G. Morris (1808–1900), maritime advocate, sheep and cattle breeder
- Sir Lewis Morris (1833–1907), Welsh poet, academic and politician
- Lewis Gouverneur Morris (1882–1967), banker and social figure in New York and Newport society
