= Thomas Morris =

Thomas Morris may refer to:

== Entertainment ==
- Thomas Morris (musician) (1897–1945), jazz cornetist
- Thomas Baden Morris (1900s–1986), playwright
- Thomas Morris (author), Welsh writer and editor
- Sodapoppin (real name Thomas Morris; born 1994), American streamer

== Politics ==
- Thomas Morris (New York politician) (1771–1849), U.S. Representative from New York
- Thomas Morris (Ohio politician) (1776–1844), Senator from Ohio
- Thomas Owen Morris (1845–1924), American mayor of Nashville, Tennessee
- Thomas Morris (Wisconsin politician) (1861–1928), Lieutenant Governor of Wisconsin, 1911–1915
- Thomas G. Morris (1919–2016), U.S. congressman from New Mexico
- Thomas R. Morris (born 1944), Virginia Secretary of Education, university president
- Thomas Richard Morris, British Conservative politician and magistrate who served as Mayor of St Pancras 1961–62

== Religion and philosophy ==
- Thomas Asbury Morris (1794–1874), American bishop of the Methodist Episcopal Church and newspaper editor
- Thomas Morris (bishop) (1914–1997), Irish prelate of the Catholic Church
- Thomas V. Morris (born 1952), American philosopher and director of the Morris Institute of Human Values

== Other ==
- Thomas Morris (British Army officer) (1732–1818), British Army officer and writer
- Thomas A. Morris (1811–1904), American General in the Union army, railroad executive and civil engineer
- Thomas Morris (engineer) (died 1832), English architect and engineer
- Thomas John Morris (1837–1912), U.S. federal judge
- Thomas Charles Morris, Welsh trade unionist and political activist
- Thomas Morris (American football) (1938–2010), American football player and coach
- Thomas Morris (surveyor), Welsh surveyor

== See also ==
- Tom Morris (disambiguation)
- Thomas Maurice, Oriental scholar and historian
