= Kevin Morris =

Kevin Morris may refer to:

- Kevin Morris (American football) (born 1962), American football coach and former player
- Kevin Morris (Australian footballer) (born 1950), Australian retired football player and coach
- Kevin Morris (writer) (born 1963), American writer, producer, and lawyer
