= Simon Morris =

Simon Morris may refer to:

- Simon Morris (businessman) (born 1977), British businessman
- Simon Morris (politician) (c. 1780–1857), Irish-born politician in Newfoundland
- Simon Conway Morris (born 1951), English palaeontologist
