= Ron Morris =

Ron, Ronnie or Ronald Morris may refer to:

- Ron Morris (pole vaulter) (1935–2024), American pole vault 1960 Olympic silver medalist
- Ron Morris (American football) (born 1964), American National Football League wide receiver
- Ron Morris (Canadian football), Canadian Football League player (1959–1965) and coach (1967–1968)
- Ronnie Morris, musician with the Canadian indie rock band controller.controller
- Ronnie Morris (footballer) (born 1970), English former professional footballer
- Ronnie Morris (rugby union) (1913–1983), Welsh rugby union player
