= Cynthia Taft Morris =

American development economist (1928–2013)

- Born: April 28, 1928
- Died: July 16, 2013 (aged 85)
- Occupation: Economist
- Spouse: Rev. Donald Richard Morris

Cynthia Taft Morris (April 28, 1928 – July 16, 2013) was an American development economist. As a teenager, she and her sister Rosalyn contracted polio, leading to Rosalyn's death at the age of eleven. She was a graduate from Vassar College, London School of Economics and Yale. And she worked on the Marshall Plan, at the World Bank and most notably with Irma Adelman. Cynthia Taft Morris was a granddaughter of former President William Howard Taft.

== Selected publications ==
- Irma Adelman; Cynthia Taft Morris (1967). Society, politics & economic development: a quantitative approach. Johns Hopkins Press.
- Irma Adelman; Cynthia Taft Morris (1973). Economic Growth and Social Equity in Developing Countries. Stanford University Press. ISBN 978-0-8047-0837-1.
