= Richard Morris =

Richard Morris may refer to:

- Richard Morris (actor) (1862–1924), Silent era American actor
- Richard Morris (archaeologist) (born 1947), English archaeologist and historian
- Richard Morris (author) (1939–2003), American author, editor, and poet
- Richard Morris (editor) (1703–1779), Welsh folklorist and editor of the Welsh-language Bible
- Richard Morris (philologist) (1833–1894), English philologist, Anglican priest, and writer
- Richard Morris (songwriter), American songwriter and record producer
- Richard B. Morris (1904–1989), American historian
- Richard Morris (industrialist) (1925–2008), British engineer and industrialist
- Richard G. Morris (born 1948), British neuroscientist and memory researcher
- Richard Thacker Morris (1917–1981), American sociologist and author
- Dick Morris (born 1947), American political author and commentator

== Politics and law ==
- Richard Morris (New York judge) (1730–1810), New York politician and Chief Justice of the Supreme Court
- Richard Valentine Morris (1765–1814), U.S. Navy officer and New York politician
- Richard Morris (Texas judge) (1815–1844), Republic of Texas Supreme Court Justice, 1841–1844
- Richard P. Morris (1855–1925), mayor of Salt Lake City, Utah
- Richard Morris (British politician) (1869–1956), British Member of Parliament for Battersea North, 1918–1922
- Richard Morris (diplomat) (1967–2020), British diplomat
- Rick Morris (politician) (born 1968), U.S. politician in Virginia

== Sports ==
- Richard Morris (athlete) (1921–1995), British Olympic athlete
- Rick Morris (ice hockey) (1946–1998), Canadian ice hockey player
- Richard Morris (South African cricketer) (born 1947), South African cricketer, played Western Province 1967–79
- Richard Morris (English cricketer) (born 1987), English cricketer, played for Loughborough University
- Dickie Morris (1879–?), Welsh footballer who played as an inside forward

== See also ==
- Richard Maurice (1893–1955), filmmaker
