= Rob Morris =

Rob Morris may refer to:

- Rob Morris (American football) (born 1975), American former National Football League player
- Rob Morris (Freemason) (1818–1888), American poet and Freemason

== See also ==
- Robert Morris (disambiguation)
