= Alfred Morris (cricketer) =

English cricketer

Personal information
- Full name: Alfred Morris
- Born: 11 September 1876; West Hartlepool, County Durham, England
- Died: 29 March 1961 (aged 84); Lancaster Moor, Lancashire, England
- Batting: Right-handed
- Bowling: Right-arm medium

Domestic team information
- Years: Team
- 1912: Minor Counties
- 1905–1914: Durham

Career statistics
Competition	First-class
Matches	2
Runs scored	7
Batting average	3.50
100s/50s	–/–
Top score	4
Balls bowled	251
Wickets	10
Bowling average	8.00
5 wickets in innings	–
10 wickets in match	–
Best bowling	4/50
Catches/stumpings	–/–
- Source: Cricinfo, 12 August 2011

Alfred Morris (11 September 1876 – 29 March 1961) was an English cricketer. Morris was a right-handed batsman who bowled right-arm medium pace. He was born in West Hartlepool, County Durham.

Morris made his debut for Durham against Northumberland in the 1905 Minor Counties Championship. He played Minor counties cricket for Durham from 1905 to 1904, making 89 Minor Counties Championship appearances. He made a first-class appearance for the Minor Counties against the touring South Africans in 1912. In this match, he scored 3 runs in the Minor Counties only innings before being dismissed by Sid Pegler. In the South Africans only innings, he took all three wickets to fall in the innings: Louis Tancred, Tommy Ward and Tip Snooke for the cost of 5 runs from 6.3 overs. He made a further first-class appearance in 1912 for an England XI against the touring Australians. He took figures of 4/50 in the Australians first-innings, while in their second he took figures of 3/25. With the bat, he scored 4 runs in the England XI first-innings, before being dismissed by Bill Whitty, while he wasn't required to bat in their second-innings.

He died on Lancaster Moor in Lancashire on 29 March 1961.
