= Niall Morris =

Niall Morris may refer to:

- Niall Morris (singer) (born 1975), Irish classical singer and producer
- Niall Morris (rugby union) (born 1988), Irish rugby union footballer
