= Nathan Morris (evangelist) =

English evangelist

- Born: 1979 (age 46–47); England
- Occupations: Evangelist, preacher
- Known for: Bay Revival; founder of Shake the Nations
- Spouse: Rachel Morris (m. 2011)
- Parent(s): Peter Morris, Pamela Morris
- Website: Shake the Nations

Nathan Morris (born 1979) is an English evangelist known for the Bay of the Holy Spirit Revival, or Bay Revival a spiritual event touring the US and being broadcast internationally on television. He is also the founder of Shake the Nations, an organization that holds Gospel crusades and undertakes humanitarian work in developing countries.

Nathan Morris's father is Peter Morris and his mother is Pamela Morris. They live in Rotherham, South Yorkshire and are retired Pastors of a Pentecostal Church.

== The Bay Revival ==
The Bay Revival started in Mobile, Alabama, in July 2010 while Morris was preaching at Church of His Presence in Daphne, Alabama, headed by John Kilpatrick. It was held at the Mobile Convention Center for several months attracting mass audiences after supernatural healings were reported in the media. ABC News covered the Bay Revival in its programme 'Faith Matters' and the Huffington Post observed that thousands of people from across the USA had attended, "having been spurred on by viral Internet videos".

The Bay Revival took its name from the original name of Mobile Bay, Bahía del Espíritu Santo' (Bay of The Holy Spirit) It includes preaching from Morris and Kilpatrick and music by Lydia Stanley, the worship leader at Church of His Presence. Since March 2011 Bay Revival has toured several US cities including: Youngstown, Ohio; Detroit, Michigan; Orlando, Florida and Phoenix, Arizona. GOD TV has covered Nathan Morris preaching live from these cities and he has appeared on 'At the Altar' a prayer broadcast presented by Rory & Wendy Alec in Jerusalem.

== Shake The Nations ==
Morris became a Christian in 2002 and established Shake The Nations in 2006 which is headquartered in South Yorkshire, UK. Since then he has traveled throughout Africa, India and the USA preaching in mass gatherings. Christianity Today refers to Morris as "a British evangelist who shot to fame after holding a revival in America" and carries the claim that Morris has impacted the lives of hundred thousands of people through his Shake The Nations organization.

Christian broadcaster Sid Roth described Morris as "a young man with serious addictions and an immoral lifestyle until God changed his life. Today he's appearing to millions through the media."

Morris married his wife, Rachel Morris, in the US in 2011.
