= Russell Morris (disambiguation) =

Russell Morris (born 1948) is an Australian singer-songwriter.

Russell Morris may also refer to:

- Russell Morris (footballer) (born 1962), Australian-rules footballer
- Russell E. Morris (born 1967), British chemist
- Russell Morris (album), a 1975 album by the Australian singer-songwriter
