= Sylvia Morris =

Sylvia Morris may refer to:

- Sylvia Jukes Morris (1935–2020), British biographer
- Dame Sylvia Morris, British headteacher (see the list of dames commander of the Order of the British Empire)
