= Jenny Morris (chef) =

- Born: Durban, South Africa
- Culinary career
- Current restaurants: FIRST; SECOND
- Television show: Jenny Morris Cooks Morocco
- Website: www.jennymorris.co.za

Jenny Morris, also known as "The Giggling Gourmet", is a celebrity chef and radio personality from South Africa. Having run a cooking school since 1997, and appearing on television and radio in South Africa, she has signed to appear on the Food Network, becoming the first South African to host her own show on the channel.

== Biography ==
Morris opened "Cook's Playground" in 1997, operating it as a cooking school and catering company. She has written three cookbooks, "Rude Food, Nude Food, Good Food" in 2004, "More Rude Food" in 2006 and "Cooking with Jenny Morris" in 2012, as well as contributing to magazines and writing a weekly column for an entertainment guide in South Africa. She is also a presenter on radio station Cape Talk, where she discusses both food and romance.

She has appeared in a show for the Food Network entitled Jenny Morris Cooks Morocco, having signed for the network in August 2011. It was the first occasion that a South African chef has appeared on their own show on the channel, and was filmed over the course of five minutes. She has lent her name to a range of condiments.

== Personal life ==
She lives with her family in Cape Town.
