= Roger Morris =

Roger Morris may refer to:

- Roger Morris (architect) (1695–1749), British architect
- Roger Morris (British Army officer) (1727–1794)
- Roger Morris (engineer) (1933–2001)
- Roger Morris (American writer) (born 1938), historian and author of several books on Nixon, Kissinger, Haig, and the Clintons
- R. N. Morris (Roger N. Morris, born 1960), British historical fiction novelist
- Roger Morris (bishop) (born 1968), current bishop of Colchester

== See also ==
- 555 Edgecombe Avenue (originally the Roger Morris), apartment building in New York City
- Roger Morrice, English minister and journalist
