= Brian Morris =

Brian or Bryan Morris may refer to:

- Brian Morris (biologist) (born 1950), Australian molecular biologist and professor at the University of Sydney
- Brian Morris, Baron Morris of Castle Morris (1930–2001), British poet, critic and professor of literature
- Brian Morris (anthropologist) (born 1936), professor of anthropology at London University
- Brian Morris (judge) (born 1963), federal judge in Montana
- Brian Morris (art director) (born 1939), British art director
- Bryan Morris (born 1987), baseball pitcher
