= Stephen Morris =

Stephen or Steven Morris may refer to:

== Sportspeople ==
- Stephen Morris (American football) (born 1992), American football player
- Stephen Morris (runner) (born 1988), British Paralympic athlete
- Stephen Morris (footballer) (born 1976), English footballer
- Steven Morris (Australian footballer) (born 1988), Australian rules footballer

== Others ==
- Stephen Morris (politician) (1946–2025), member of the Kansas Senate
- Stephen Morris (drummer) (born 1957), rock musician in the bands Joy Division, New Order, The Other Two and Bad Lieutenant
- Stephen Morris (theologian), Eastern Orthodox priest and writer
- Stephen Morris (economist) (born 1963), game theorist at MIT, president of the Econometric Society, and former editor of Econometrica
- Stephen Morris (novel), a 1961 novel by Nevile Shute

== See also ==
- Stephon Morris (born 1991), American football cornerback
