= Maesmore Morris =

Australian cricketer

Personal information
- Born: 1868; Northcote, Victoria, Australia
- Died: 31 August 1917 (aged 48–49); Ivanhoe, Victoria, Australia

Domestic team information
- Years: Team
- 1888-1889: Victoria
- Source: Cricinfo, 25 July 2015

Maesmore Morris (1868 – 31 August 1917) was an Australian cricketer. He played five first-class cricket matches for Victoria between 1888 and 1889.

== See also ==
- List of Victoria first-class cricketers
