= Frank Morris (speedcuber) =

American speedcuber (born 1981)

- Born: August 25, 1981 (age 44); Boise, Idaho, U.S.
- Known for: Rubik's Cube speedsolving
- Website: bigcubes.com

Frank Morris (born August 25, 1981) is an American competitive speedcuber. He is best known for being the 2005 World Champion in the 5×5×5 event as well as achieving the world record six different times; once in the 4×4×4 and five times in the 5×5×5 event.

In 2020, Morris was featured in a local news article by KTVB. The report highlighted his long career and passion for speedcubing despite retiring competitively in 2009.

Morris's competition participation decreased after 2009, when he had previously attended multiple events each year. His last appearances before a long hiatus were in 2011, 2013, and 2014. After an 11-year competition break, he returned at SacCubing XIX 2025. In his second competition back, at Southwest Idaho Newcomers 2025, he set new personal bests in his 4×4×4 single and average times, as well as in his 5×5×5 single time.
