= Michael Morris =

Michael Morris may refer to:

== Arts ==
- Michael Morris (artist) (1942–2022), British-born Canadian visual artist
- Michael Morris (director) (born 1974), English television director and producer
- Michael Morris (screenwriter) (1918–2003), Ukraine-born American television and film screenwriter
- MickDeth (Mick Richard Morris, 1978–2013), American musician

== Politics ==
- Michael Morris, Baron Morris (1826–1901), Irish lawyer and political figure, became the first Lord Killanin in 1900
- Michael Morris, 3rd Baron Killanin (1914–1999), Irish former head of the International Olympic Committee
- Michael Morris, Baron Naseby (born 1936), British Conservative politician, Deputy Speaker of the House of Commons 1992–1997

== Science and industry ==
- Michael G. Morris (born 1947), president, chief executive officer, and chairman of American Electric Power
- G. Michael Morris, scientist, past president of the Optical Society of America
- Michael Morris (oceanographer), scientist and entrepreneur, founder of Ocean Optics, Inc.

== Sports ==
- Mick Morris (footballer, born 1943) (1943–2020), English footballer
- Mick Morris (Australian footballer) (1882–1959), Australian rules footballer
- Mick Morris (Gaelic footballer) (born 1943), Irish former sportsperson
- Mouse Morris (Michael Morris, born 1951), Irish racehorse trainer
- Michael Armstrong (boxer) (born 1968), British boxer, born Michael Morris

== See also ==
- Mike Morris (disambiguation)
