= Stephon Morris =

American football player (born 1991)

Profile
- Position: Cornerback

Personal information
- Born: January 12, 1991 (age 35); Washington, DC, U.S.
- Listed height: 5 ft 8 in (1.73 m)
- Listed weight: 190 lb (86 kg)

Career information
- High school: Greenbelt (MD) Eleanor Roosevelt
- College: Penn State
- NFL draft: 2013: undrafted

Career history
- New England Patriots (2013)*; Winnipeg Blue Bombers (2014)*
- * Offseason or practice squad member only

Stephon Antoine Morris (born January 12, 1991) is an American former football cornerback who is currently a free agent. Morris played college football for Penn State.

== Early life ==
A native of Greenbelt, Maryland, Morris attended Eleanor Roosevelt High School in Greenbelt, Maryland, and played cornerback for the Eleanor Roosevelt Raiders high school football team. Regarded as a three-star recruit by Rivals.com, Morris was listed the No. 64 cornerback prospect in his class.

== College career ==
While attending Penn State University, Morris played for the Penn State Nittany Lions football team from 2009 to 2012. As a freshman in 2009, Morris recorded 29 tackles, two tackles for loss, one sack, one pass defensed, and one interception. As a sophomore, he made 39 tackles (0.5 for loss) and defensed one pass. As a junior, he recorded 19 tackles (one for loss) and defensed five passes. His senior season proved his most productive, as he finished the season with 60 tackles (five for loss), 1.5 sacks, and five passes defensed.

In 2009, Morris was awarded All - Big Ten freshman team as an true freshman.

In 2012, Morris was selected by the coaches as the Jim O'Hora award winner, presented to the most improved defensive player. He was also a member of the All - Big Ten teams honorable mention (coaches and media).

== Professional career ==
Pre-draft measurables
Height	Weight	Arm length	Hand span	40-yard dash	10-yard split	20-yard split	Vertical jump	Broad jump	Bench press
5 ft 8 in (1.73 m)	188 lb (85 kg)	30 7/8 in (0.78 m)	9 5/8 in (0.24 m)	4.35 s	1.53 s	2.53 s	35.5 in (0.90 m)	10 ft 0 in (3.05 m)	18 reps
All values from Penn State's Pro Day

On April 27, 2013, Morris was signed as an undrafted free agent by the New England Patriots. On August 1, 2013, Morris was released by the New England Patriots.

On August 26, 2013, Morris was re-signed by the Patriots. On August 31, 2013, he was cut by the Patriots.
