= Maurice (name) =

- Pronunciation: UK: /ˈmɒrɪs/ US: /ˈmɔːrəs/
- Gender: Male
- Language: English, French

Origin
- Languages: 1. Latin; 2. Irish
- Origin: 1. Mauricius, Mauritius; 2. Muirgheos
- Derivation: 1. Maurus; 2. muir + gus
- Meaning: 1. 'from 'Mauretania'; 2. 'sea choice'

Other names
- Related names: Mārcis, Māris, Moritz, Maurizio, Mauro, Mauricio, Morris, Mauritius

Maurice is a traditionally masculine given name, also used as a surname. It originates as a French name derived from the Latin Mauritius or Mauricius and was subsequently used in other languages. Its popularity is due to Mauritius, a saint of the Theban Legion (died 287). Mauritius is otherwise attested as a given name of the Roman Empire period, in origin meaning "one from Mauretania", i.e. "the Moor".

Forms in other languages include: Latvian Māris, Spanish Mauricio, Portuguese Maurício, Italian Maurizio, Dutch Maurits, Greek Μαυρίκιος (Mavrikios), Russian Маврикий (Mavrikiy), German Moritz, Czech Mořic, English Morris. In the form Morris, it is also used as a secularized version of the Jewish name Moishe.

== Given name ==
=== Late Antiquity to Middle Ages ===
- Saint Maurice also Moritz, Morris, or Mauritius (died 287), Roman-Egyptian legionnaire and Christian martyr
- Maurice (emperor) or Flavius Mauricius novus Tiberius Augustus (539–602), Byzantine emperor
- Maurice (bishop of London) (died 1107), bishop of London, Lord Chancellor and Lord Keeper of England
- Maurice of Carnoet (1117–1191), French abbot and saint
- Maurice, Count of Oldenburg (fl. 1169–1211), count of Oldenburg
- Mauritius (Dean of Armagh) (fl. 13th century), Irish cleric, Dean of Armagh 1238
- Maurice of Inchaffray (14th century), Scottish bishop
- Maurice Spata (14th to early 15th century), Albanian ruler of Arta from 1399 to 1414/15

=== Early Modern ===
- Maurice, Elector of Saxony (1521–1553), German Saxon nobleman
- Maurice, Duke of Saxe-Lauenburg (1551–1612), duke of Saxe-Lauenburg
- Maurice, Landgrave of Hesse-Kassel or Maurice the Learned (1572–1632), Landgrave of Hesse-Kassel
- Maurice of Nassau, Prince of Orange (1567–1625), stadtholder of the Netherlands
- Maurice of Savoy (1593–1657), prince of Savoy and a cardinal
- Maurice, Duke of Saxe-Zeitz (1619–1681), duke of Saxe-Zeitz
- Maurice of the Palatinate (1620–1652), Count Palatine of the Rhine
- William Maurice, Prince of Nassau-Siegen (1649–1691), prince of Nassau-Siegen

=== Modern ===
- Maurice of Battenberg (1891–1914), prince of the Battenberg family and member of the British Royal Family
- Maurice of the Netherlands (1843–1850), prince of Orange-Nassau
- Maurice Anderson (born 1975), American football player
- Maurice Bailey (died 2018), formerly missing person lost at sea
- Maurice Baker (born 1979), American basketball player and coach
- Maurice Banks (born 1983), American football coach
- Maurice De Bevere (1923–2001), Belgian cartoonist
- Maurice Binder (1918–1991), American film title designer
- Maurice Blanchot (1907–2003), French writer, philosopher, and literary theorist
- Maurice Bowra (1898–1971), English classical scholar and academic
- Maurice de Bus (1907–1963), French sculptor
- Maurice Riemer Calhoun, Sr., known as Riemer Calhoun (1909–1994), American politician
- Maurice Chevalier, (1888–1972), French actor, singer and entertainer
- Maurice Cole (disambiguation), several people
- Maurice Cowling (1926–2005), British historian
- Maurice Cox (born 1972), American basketball player
- Maurice Crum (disambiguation), multiple people
- Maurice Deligne (1861–1939), French politician
- Maurice Denuzière (1926–2025), French journalist and writer
- Maurice Duplessis (1890–1959), 16th Premier of Quebec, Canada
- Maurice Duval (1869–1958), French general and aviator
- Maurice Evans (disambiguation), multiple people
- Maurice Fadel (1928–2009), Lebanese businessman and politician
- Maurice Failevic (1933–2016), French film director
- Maurice Ffrench (born 1998), American football player
- Maurice Elwood Frump, known as Babe Frump (1901–1979), American football player
- Maurice Gambier d'Hurigny (1912–2000), French sculptor
- Maurice Gamelin (1872–1958), French general remembered for his unsuccessful command of the French military in 1940 during the Battle of France
- Maurice Garin (1871–1957), French road bicycle racer
- Maurice Gibb (1949–2003), British singer, songwriter, multi-instrumentalist, and record producer
- Maurice Godelier (born 1934), French anthropologist
- Maurice Grau (1849–1907), Austrian-born American impresario
- Maurice Greene (athlete), American sprinter
- Maurice Grevisse (1895–1980), Belgian grammarian
- Maurice A. Hartnett III (1927–2009), American jurist who served as a Justice of the Supreme Court of Delaware
- Maurice Heaton (1900–1990), Swiss-born American glass artist
- Maurice Healy (campaigner) (1933–2020), British consumer campaigner
- Maurice Howard, British art historian
- Maurice Hurst Jr. (born 1995), American football player
- Maurice Anthony Jayaweera, Chief of Staff of the Sri Lanka Army 1969-1974
- Maurice Jenks (1872-1946), 604th Lord Mayor of London
- Maurice Kemp (born 1991), American basketball player in the Israeli Basketball Premier League
- Maurice LaMarche, Canadian actor
- Maurice Leblanc (1864–1941), French novelist and writer
- Maurice Leyland (1900–1967), English cricketer
- Maurice Line (1928–2010), British library and information scientist
- Maurice Meisner (1931–2012), historian of 20th century China
- Maurice de Mel, Sri Lankan Sinhala army colonel
- Maurice Merleau-Ponty (1908–1961), French phenomenological philosopher
- Maurice Joseph Micklewhite, birth name of Michael Caine, English actor
- Maurice Ndour (born 1992), Senegalese basketball player for Hapoel Jerusalem of the Israeli Basketball Premier League
- Maurice O'Neill (Irish republican) (d. 1942), executed Irish Republican
- Maurice Pelletier (1896–1971), Canadian politician
- Maurice Pluskota (born 1992), German basketball player
- Maurice Ravel (1875–1937), French Impressionist music composer and pianist
- Maurice Richard (1921–2000), Canadian ice hockey player
- Maurice Rioli (1957–2010), Australian football player
- Maurice Roëves (1937–2020), English actor
- Maurice Rozenthal (born 1975), French ice hockey player
- Maurice Ruah (born 1971), Venezuelan tennis player
- Maurice Sendak (1928–2012), American writer known for Where the Wild Things Are
- Maurice K. Smith (1926–2020), New Zealand-born American architect
- Maurice Salvador Sreshta (1872–1952), Postmaster General of Sri Lanka from 1923 to 1928
- Maurice Stuckey (born 1990), German basketball player
- Maurice Schwartz (1889–1960), Russian-born actor
- Maurice Tornay (1910–1949), Swiss Catholic missionary
- Maurice Tulloch (born 1969), British/Canadian businessman
- Maurice Utrillo (1883–1955), French painter
- Maurice Vellacott (born 1955), Canadian politician
- Maurice Vinot (1888–1916), French film actor
- Maurice de Vlaminck (1876–1958), French painter, one of the principals in the Fauve movement
- Maurice Watson (born 1993), American basketball player for Maccabi Rishon LeZion of the Israeli Basketball Premier League
- Maurice Wilkins (1916–2004), New Zealand-born English physicist and molecular biologist, and Nobel Laureate

=== Fictional characters ===
- Maurice, a character from the 1991 and 2017 films based on Gabrielle-Suzanne Barbot de Villeneuve's Beauty and the Beast.
- Maurice, Samantha Steven's father in Bewitched.
- Maurice, a monster character in the 1989 film Little Monsters
- Maurice the gorilla, character in the 1990s American animated television series Raw Toonage, and it's spinoff series Marsupilami, voiced by Jim Cummings
- Maurice Lalonde (Highlander character), character in the television program Highlander: The Series
- Maurice Levy (The Wire), character in the television program The Wire
- Maurice Moss, character from the British sitcom The IT Crowd
- Rap Master Maurice, a character portrayed by artist Derek Erdman
- Sonic Maurice Hedgehog, real name of Sonic the Hedgehog in the Archie Comics
- Maurice Hall, protagonist in the book Maurice by E.M. Forster
- Maurice Conchis from the novel 'The Magus' by John Fowles
- Maurice a character from the novel 'Undersea Reincarnation' by calcroissant
- Maurice, a virtuous orangutan who acts as adviser to the noble chimpanzee leader Caesar on Rise of the Planet of the Apes, Dawn of the Planet of the Apes, and War of the Planet of the Apes.
- Maurice Minnifield, ex-astronaut, entrepreneur, and unofficial mayor of the fictional Cicely, Alaska in Northern Exposure.

== Surname ==
- Arthur Bartlett Maurice (1873–1946), American editor of the Woodbridge (NJ) Register
- Benoît Maurice (born 1971), French football central defender
- Charles G. Maurice (1911–1997), American teacher of dentistry and pioneer of endodontics
- Clément Maurice (1853–1933), French photographer
- David Maurice (1626–1702), Welsh priest and translator
- David M. Maurice (1922–2002), British ophthalmologist
- Emil Maurice (1897–1972), German watchmaker and senior Nazi Party official
- Florian Maurice (born 1974), French footballer
- Frederick Barton Maurice (1871–1951), British general, military correspondent, writer and academic
- Frederick Denison Maurice (1805–1872), British author, theologian, and socialist
- Henry Maurice (minister) (1634–1682), Welsh priest who became an Independent minister
- Henry Maurice (theologian) (c. 1647 – 1691), Welsh clergyman and professor
- Henry Gascoyne Maurice (1847–1950), English zoologist
- Hugh Maurice (1775–1825), transcriber of Welsh manuscripts
- James Maurice (1814–1884), American politician from New York
- James Wilkes Maurice (1775–1857), United Kingdom Royal Navy officer
- Jean-Eudes Maurice (born 1986), French-born Haitian footballer
- John D. Maurice, American writer and Pulitzer Prize winner
- John Frederick Maurice (1841–1912), English soldier and military writer
- María Belén Pérez Maurice (born 1985), Argentine fencer
- Mary Maurice (1844–1918), American actress
- Mathias Maurice (1684–1738), Welsh minister and writer
- Monica Maurice (1908–1995) industrialist, first, and for 40 years the only, woman member of the Association of Mining Electrical Engineers, known as "the Lady of the Lamp".
- Paul Maurice (born 1967), Canadian hockey player and coach
- Paule Maurice (1910–1967), French composer
- Peter Maurice (priest) (1803–1878), Welsh priest and writer
- Peter Maurice (bishop) (born 1951), English cleric – bishop of Taunton
- Richard Maurice (1893– fl. 1951), Cuban-American filmmaker and labor organizer
- Thomas Maurice (fl. 1755–1824), English poet oriental scholar, historian, chaplain and vicar
- William Maurice (politician) (1552–1622), Welsh politician (an anglicization of his patronymic, ap Morys)
- William Maurice (antiquary) (1620–1680), Welsh antiquary and collector of manuscripts

== See also ==
- Moritz (disambiguation)
- Morrice, a surname
- Morris (disambiguation)
- Saint-Maurice (disambiguation)
