= 1885 =

1885 in various calendars
- Gregorian calendar: 1885; MDCCCLXXXV
- Ab urbe condita: 2638
- Armenian calendar: 1334; ԹՎ ՌՅԼԴ
- Assyrian calendar: 6635
- Baháʼí calendar: 41–42
- Balinese saka calendar: 1806–1807
- Bengali calendar: 1291–1292
- Berber calendar: 2835
- British Regnal year: 48 Vict. 1 – 49 Vict. 1
- Buddhist calendar: 2429
- Burmese calendar: 1247
- Byzantine calendar: 7393–7394
- Chinese calendar: 甲申年 (Wood Monkey); 4582 or 4375 — to — 乙酉年 (Wood Rooster); 4583 or 4376
- Coptic calendar: 1601–1602
- Discordian calendar: 3051
- Ethiopian calendar: 1877–1878
- Hebrew calendar: 5645–5646
- Hindu calendars
- Vikram Samvat: 1941–1942
- Shaka Samvat: 1806–1807
- Kali Yuga: 4985–4986
- Holocene calendar: 11885
- Igbo calendar: 885–886
- Iranian calendar: 1263–1264
- Islamic calendar: 1302–1303
- Japanese calendar: Meiji 18 (明治１８年)
- Javanese calendar: 1814–1815
- Julian calendar: Gregorian minus 12 days
- Korean calendar: 4218
- Minguo calendar: 27 before ROC 民前27年
- Nanakshahi calendar: 417
- Thai solar calendar: 2427–2428
- Tibetan calendar: ཤིང་ཕོ་སྤྲེ་ལོ་ (male Wood-Monkey); 2011 or 1630 or 858 — to — ཤིང་མོ་བྱ་ལོ་ (female Wood-Bird); 2012 or 1631 or 859

1885 (MDCCCLXXXV) was a common year starting on Thursday of the Gregorian calendar and a common year starting on Tuesday of the Julian calendar, the 1885th year of the Common Era (CE) and Anno Domini (AD) designations, the 885th year of the 2nd millennium, the 85th year of the 19th century, and the 6th year of the 1880s decade. As of the start of 1885, the Gregorian calendar was 12 days ahead of the Julian calendar, which remained in localized use until 1923.

== Events ==
=== January ===
- January 3–4 – Sino-French War: Battle of Núi Bop – French troops under General Oscar de Négrier defeat a numerically superior Qing Chinese force, in northern Vietnam.
- January 17 – Mahdist War in Sudan: Battle of Abu Klea – British troops defeat Mahdist forces.
- January 20 – American inventor LaMarcus Adna Thompson patents a roller coaster.
- January 24 – Irish rebels damage Westminster Hall and the Tower of London with dynamite.
- January 26 – Mahdist War in Sudan: Troops loyal to Mahdi Muhammad Ahmad conquer Khartoum; British commander Charles George Gordon is killed.

=== February ===
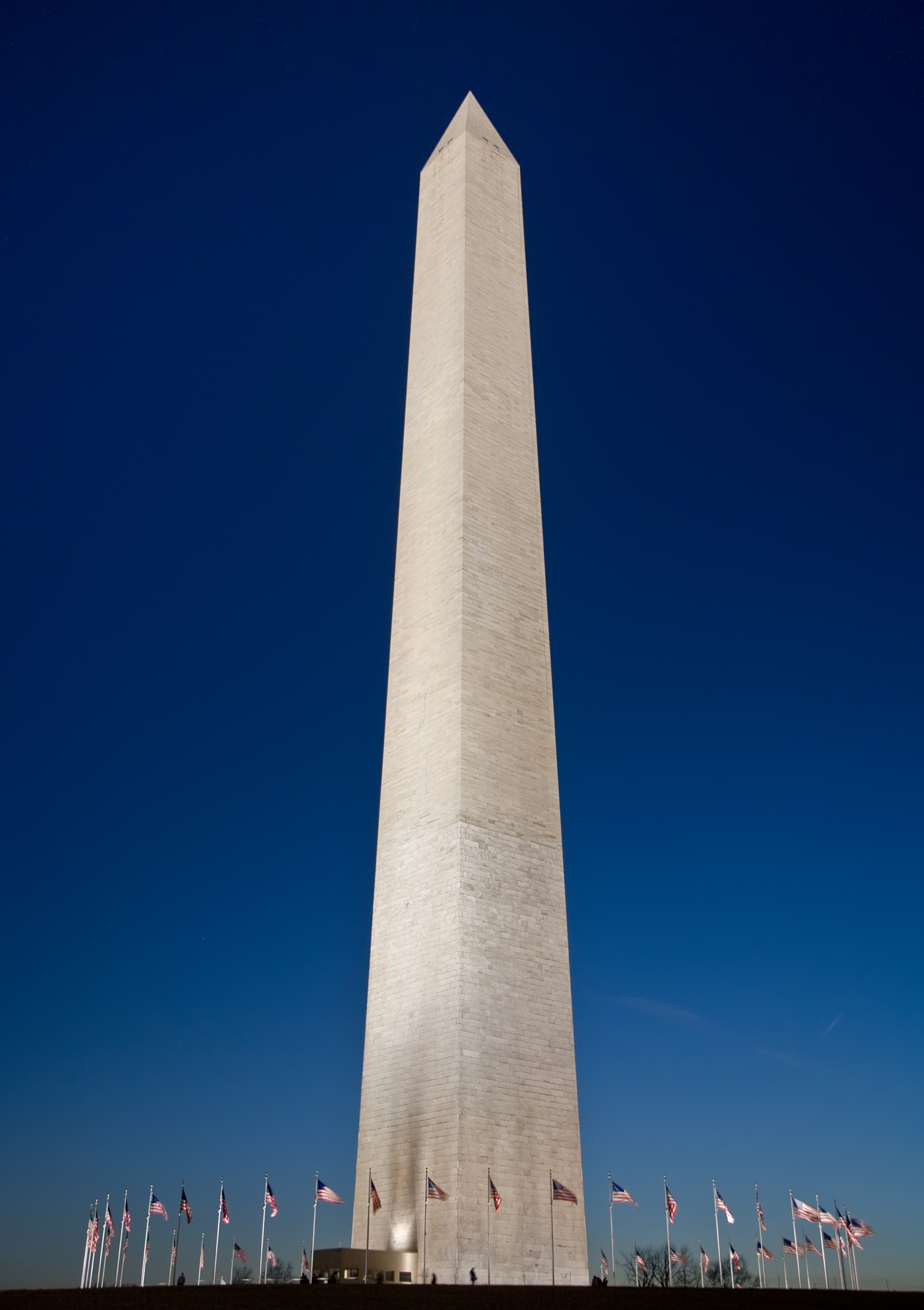
February 21: Washington Monument dedicated.

- February 5 – King Leopold II of Belgium establishes the Congo Free State, as a personal possession.
- February 9 – The first Japanese arrive in Hawaii.
- February 16 – Charles Dow publishes the first edition of the Dow Jones Industrial Average. The index stands at a level of 62.76, and represents the dollar average of 14 stocks: 12 railroads and two leading American industries.
- February 20 – The Richmond Football Club is officially formed at the Royal Hotel in the Melbourne suburb of Richmond, Victoria.
- February 21 – United States President Chester A. Arthur dedicates the Washington Monument.
- February 23
  - Sino-French War: Battle of Đồng Đăng – France gains an important victory over China, in the Tonkin region of modern-day Vietnam.
  - An English executioner fails after several attempts to hang John Babbacombe Lee, sentenced for the murder of his employer Emma Keyse; Lee's sentence is commuted to life imprisonment.
- February 26 – The final act of the Berlin Conference regulates European colonization and trade, in the "scramble for Africa".
- February 28 – February concludes without having a full moon.

=== March ===
- March 3 – A subsidiary of the American Bell Telephone Company, American Telephone and Telegraph (AT&T), is incorporated in New York.
- March 7 – The Roman Catholic Archdiocese of Madrid is founded.
- March 14 – Gilbert and Sullivan's comic opera The Mikado opens, at the Savoy Theatre in London.
- March 26
  - Prussian deportations: The Prussian government, motivated by Otto von Bismarck, expels all ethnic Poles and Jews without German citizenship from Prussia.
  - The North-West Rebellion in Canada by the Métis people, led by Louis Riel, begins with the Battle of Duck Lake.
  - First legal cremation in England: widowed painter Jeanette Pickersgill of London, "well known in literary and scientific circles", is cremated by the Cremation Society at Woking, Surrey.
- March 30 – The Battle for Kushka triggers the Panjdeh Incident, which nearly gives rise to war between the British Empire and Russian Empire.
- March 31 – The United Kingdom establishes the Bechuanaland Protectorate.

=== April ===
- April 2 – Frog Lake Massacre: Cree warriors led by Wandering Spirit kill 9 settlers at Frog Lake in the Northwest Territories.
- April 3 – Gottlieb Daimler is granted a German patent, for his single-cylinder, water-cooled engine design.
- April 11 – Luton Town Football Club is created by the merger of (Luton) Wanderers F.C. and Luton Excelsior F.C. in England.
- April 14 – Sino-French War: A French victory at Kép causes China to withdraw its forces from Tonkin, in the final engagement of the conflict.
- April 22 – Dvořák's Symphony No. 7 is premiered at St James's Hall in London with the composer himself conducting.
- April 30 – A bill is signed in the New York State legislature, forming the Niagara Falls State Park.

=== May ===
- May 2
  - Good Housekeeping magazine goes on sale for the first time in the United States.
  - North-West Rebellion: Battle of Cut Knife – Cree and Assiniboine warriors win their largest victory over Canadian forces.
- May 9–12 – North-West Rebellion: Battle of Batoche – Canadian government forces inflict a decisive defeat on Métis rebels, bringing an end to their part in the rebellion.
- May 19 – After a three-month legislative battle in the Illinois General Assembly, John A. Logan is re-elected to the United States Senate.
- May 20 – The first public train departs Swanage railway station, on the newly built Swanage Railway in England.

=== June ===
- June 2 – Dunfermline Athletic F.C. is officially formed at the Old Inn, Dunfermline, Scotland.
- June 3 – Battle of Loon Lake: The Canadian North-West Mounted Police and allies force a party of Plains Cree warriors to surrender in the last skirmish of the North-West Rebellion, and the last battle fought on Canadian soil.
- June 17 – The Statue of Liberty arrives in New York Harbor.
- June 23 – Robert Gascoyne-Cecil, 3rd Marquess of Salisbury, becomes Prime Minister of the United Kingdom.

=== July ===
- July 6 – Louis Pasteur and Émile Roux successfully test their rabies vaccine. The patient is Joseph Meister, a boy who was bitten by a rabid dog.
- July 14 – Sarah E. Goode is the first African-American woman to apply for and receive a patent, for the invention of the hideaway bed.
- July 15 – The Reservation at Niagara Falls opens, enabling access to all for free. Thomas V. Welch is the first Superintendent of the Park.
- July 16 – BHP (Broken Hill Proprietary), a worldwide mining and natural gas producer is founded in New South Wales, Australia.
- July 20 – The Football Association recognises professional players in England.
- July 28 – Louis Riel's trial for treason begins in Regina.
- July – Japan Brewery, predecessor of Kirin Holdings, is founded in Yokohama, Japan.

=== August ===
- August 19 – S Andromedae, the only supernova seen in the Andromeda Galaxy so far by astronomers, and the first ever noted outside the Milky Way, is discovered.

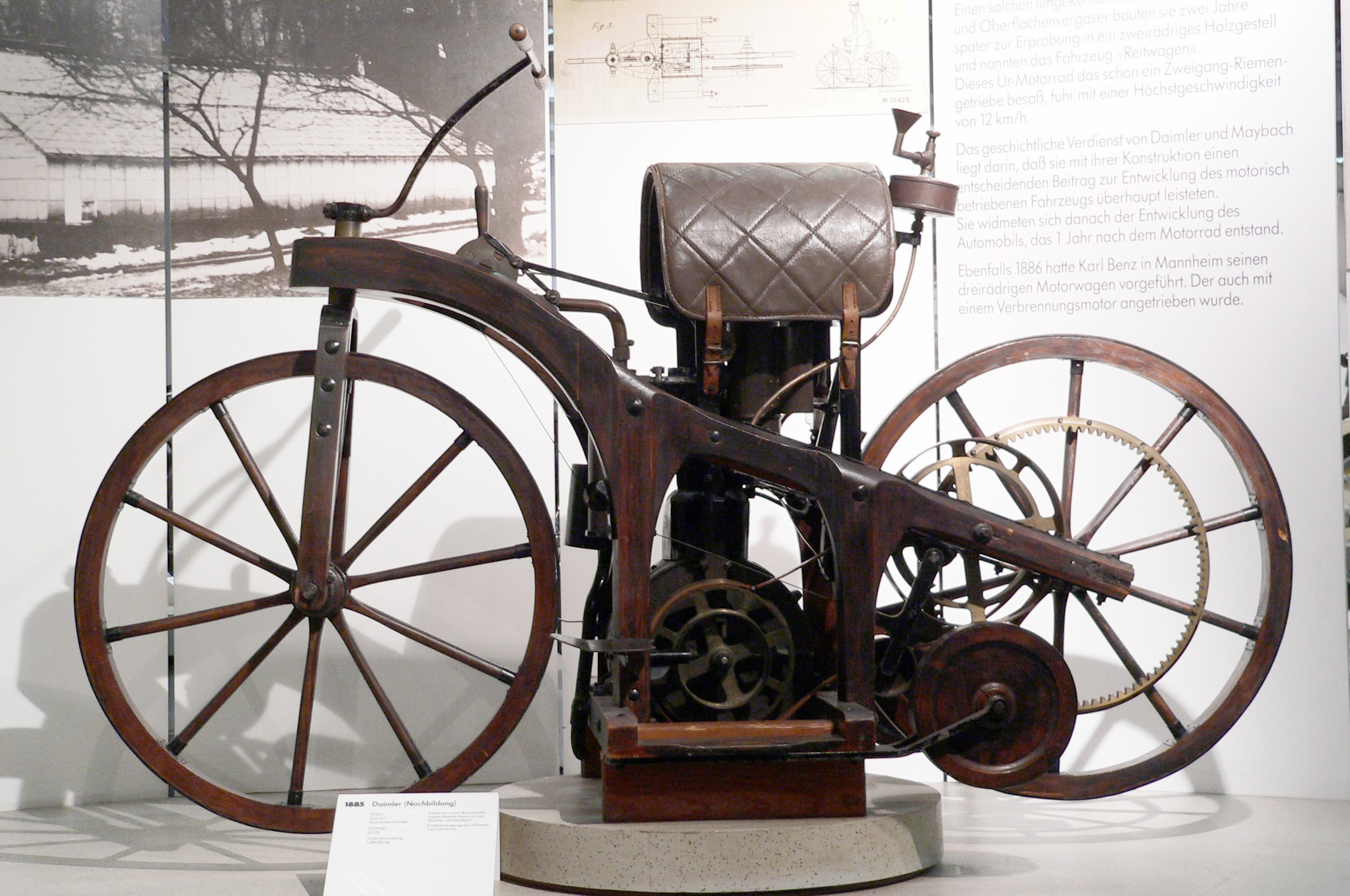
The Reitwagen (riding car), the first internal combustion motorcycle (1885)

- August 29 – Gottlieb Daimler is granted a German patent for the Daimler Reitwagen, regarded as the first motorcycle, which he has produced with Wilhelm Maybach.

=== September ===
- September 2 – The Rock Springs massacre occurs in Rock Springs, Wyoming; 150 white miners attack their Chinese coworkers, killing 28, wounding 15, and forcing several hundred more out of town.
- September 6 – Eastern Rumelia declares its union with Bulgaria, completing the unification of Bulgaria.
- September 8 – Saint Thomas Academy is founded in Minnesota.
- September 12 – Arbroath F.C. defeats Bon Accord F.C. in Scotland, 36-0, the highest score ever in professional football.
- September 15 – A train wreck of the P. T. Barnum Circus kills giant elephant Jumbo, at St. Thomas, Ontario.
- September 18
  - The union of Eastern Rumelia with Bulgaria is proclaimed at Plovdiv.
  - Five Chinese people were lynched outside of Pierce City in the Idaho Territory of the United States.
- September 30 – A British force abolishes the Boer republic of Stellaland, and adds it to British Bechuanaland.

=== October ===
- October 3 – Millwall F.C. is founded by workers on the Isle of Dogs in London, as Millwall Rovers.
- October 10 – The largest ever explosion for a non-military purpose is set off in the East River of New York City as part of a scheme for the removal of Hell Gate rocks by the United States Army Corps of Engineers.
- October 12 – The city of Fresno, California, is incorporated.
- October 13 – The Georgia Institute of Technology is established in Atlanta as the Georgia School of Technology.
- October 25 – Brahms's Symphony No. 4 is premiered in Meiningen, Germany, with the composer himself conducting.

=== November ===
- November 7 – Canadian Pacific Railway: At Craigellachie, British Columbia, the last spike is driven on a railway extending across Canada. Prime Minister John A. Macdonald considers the project to be vital to Canada, due to the exponentially greater potential for military mobility.
- November 14–28 – Serbo-Bulgarian War: Serbia declares war against Bulgaria, but is defeated in the Battle of Slivnitsa on November 17–19.
- November 16 – Louis Riel, Canadian rebel leader of the Métis, is executed for high treason.
- November 27 – St. Helena Anti-Chinese League is formed in Napa County, California.
- November – The Third Anglo-Burmese War begins.

=== December ===
- December 1 – Dr Pepper is served for the first time (as acknowledged by the U.S. Patent Office; the exact date of Dr. Pepper's invention is unknown).
- December 28 – 72 Indian lawyers, academics and journalists gather in Bombay to form the Congress Party.

=== Date unknown ===
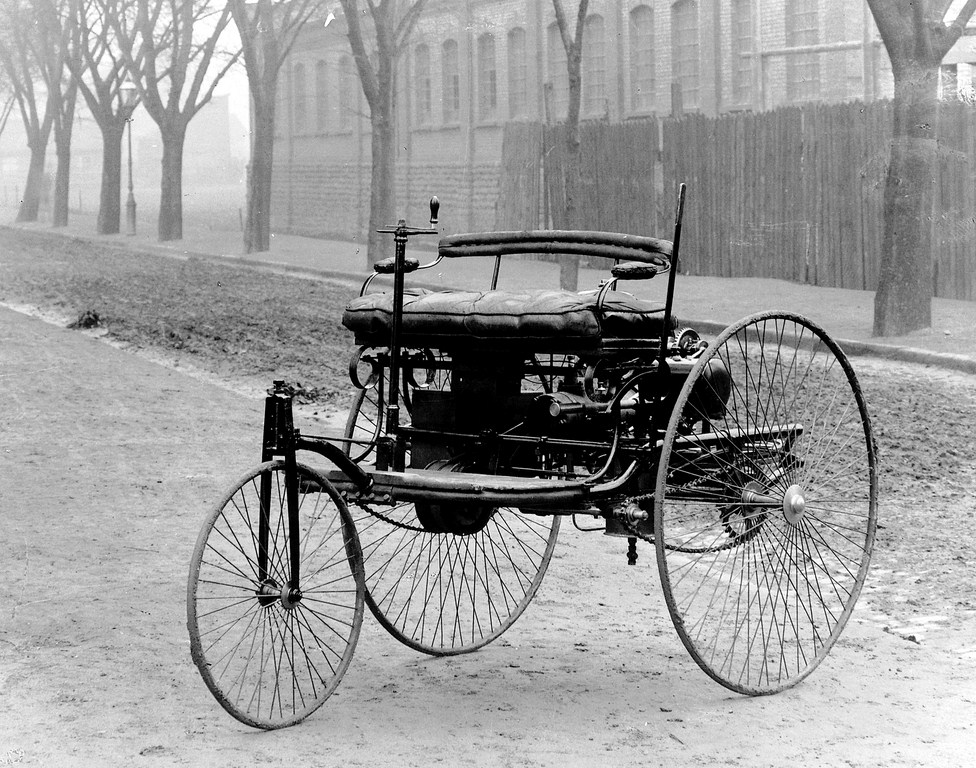
The Benz Patent-Motorwagen, built in 1885

- Martha, the last Passenger pigeon was born
- Karl Benz produces the Benz Patent-Motorwagen in Mannheim (Germany), regarded as the first automobile (patented and publicly launched the following year).
- John Kemp Starley demonstrates the Rover safety bicycle in Coventry (England), regarded as the first practical modern bicycle.
- The Home Insurance Building in Chicago, designed by William Le Baron Jenney, is completed. With ten floors and a fireproof weight-bearing metal frame, it is regarded as the first skyscraper.
- Bicycle Playing Cards are first produced in the United States.
- The Soldiers' and Sailors' Families Association is established in the United Kingdom, to provide charitable assistance.
- Camp Dudley, the oldest continually running boys' camp in the United States, is founded.
- John Ormsby publishes his new English translation of Don Quixote, acclaimed as the most scholarly made up to that time. It will remain in print through the 20th century.
- Michigan Technological University (originally Michigan Mining School) opens its doors for the first time, in the future Houghton County Fire Hall.
- Chuo Law College, as predecessor of Chuo University, founded in Kanda, Tokyo, Japan.
- Before November 1 – More than 24,000 Christians are killed, 225 churches burnt, seventeen orphanages and ten convents destroyed in Cochinchina (modern-day Vietnam).

== Births ==
=== January ===
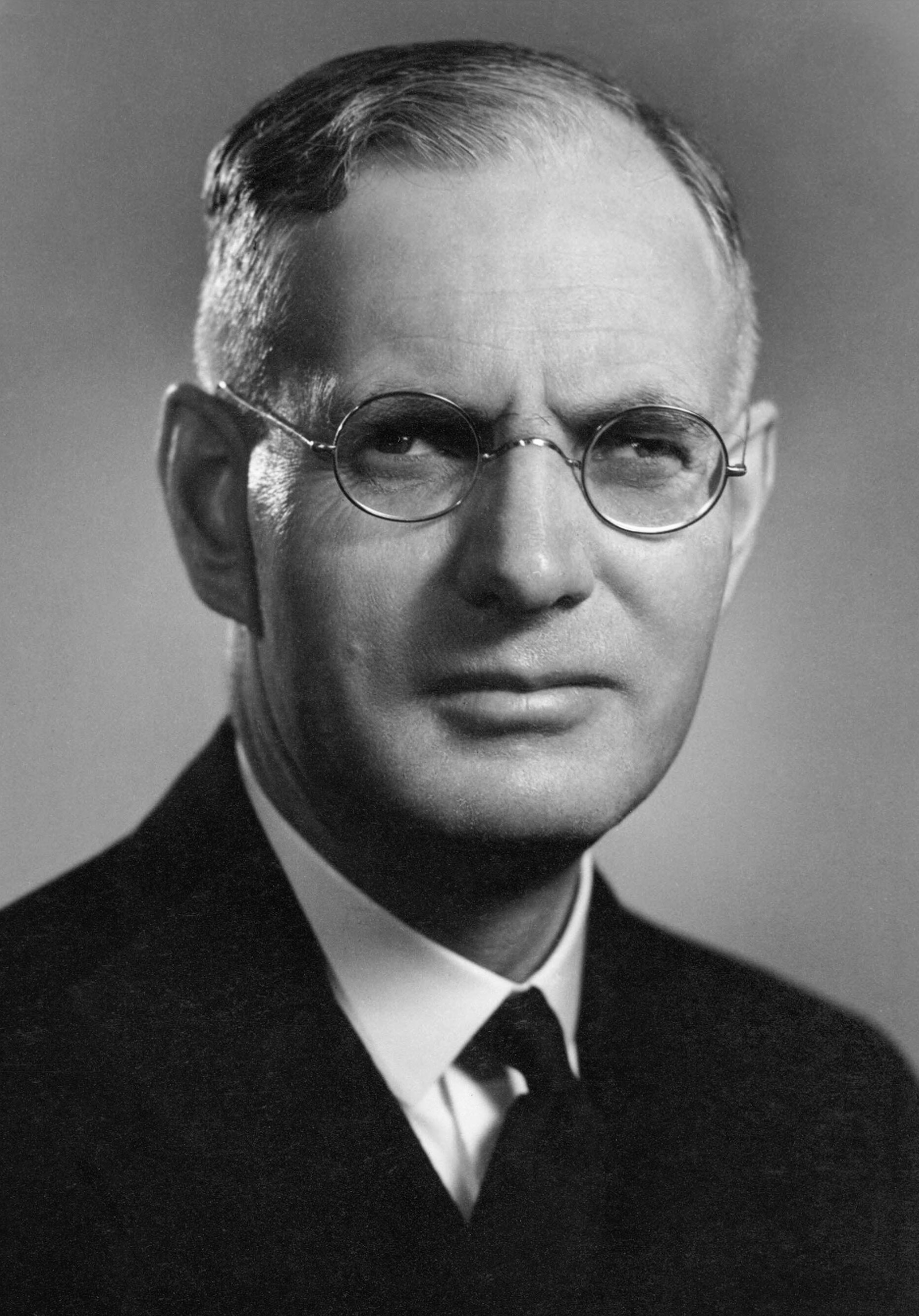
John Curtin

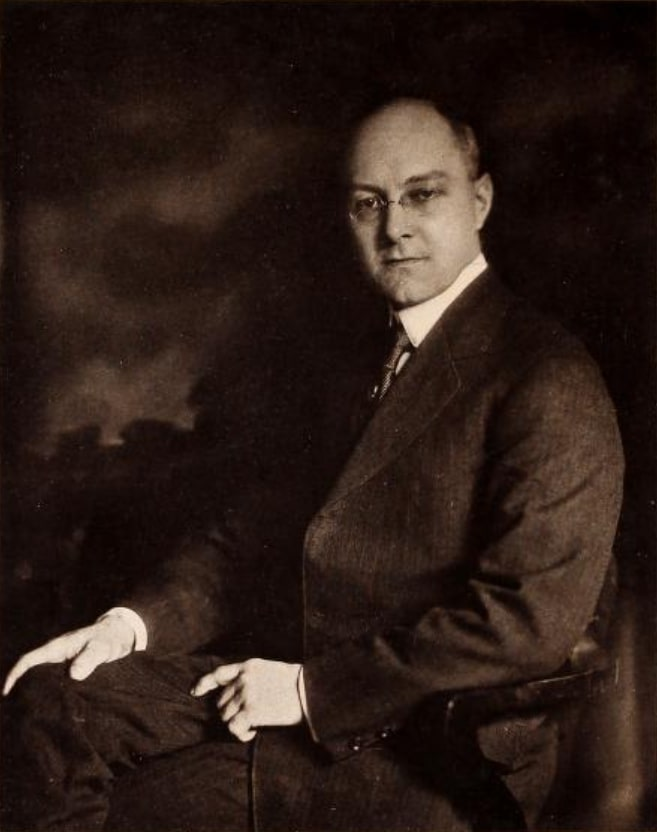
Claude Fuess

- January 1 – Winifred Greenwood, American silent film actress (d. 1961)
- January 6 – Florence Turner, American actress (d. 1946)
- January 8 – John Curtin, 14th Prime Minister of Australia (d. 1945)
- January 11
  - Jack Hoxie, American actor, rodeo performer (d. 1965)
  - Alice Paul, American women's rights activist (d. 1977)
- January 12
  - Harry Benjamin, American endocrinologist, sexologist (d. 1986)
  - Claude Fuess, American author, historian and headmaster (d. 1963)
- January 14 – Constantin Sănătescu, 44th prime minister of Romania (d. 1947)
- January 16 – Zhou Zuoren, Chinese writer (d. 1967)
- January 17 – Nikolaus von Falkenhorst, German general and war criminal (d. 1968)
- January 21 – Umberto Nobile, Italian aviator and explorer (d. 1978)
- January 25 – Roy Geiger, American general (d. 1947)
- January 26 – Harry Ricardo, English mechanical engineer, engine pioneer (d. 1974)
- January 27
  - Jerome Kern, American composer (d. 1945)
  - Harry Ruby, American musician, composer, and writer (d. 1974)
- January 28 – Władysław Raczkiewicz, President of Poland (d. 1947)
- January 30 – John Henry Towers, U. S.admiral and naval aviation pioneer (d. 1955)

=== February ===
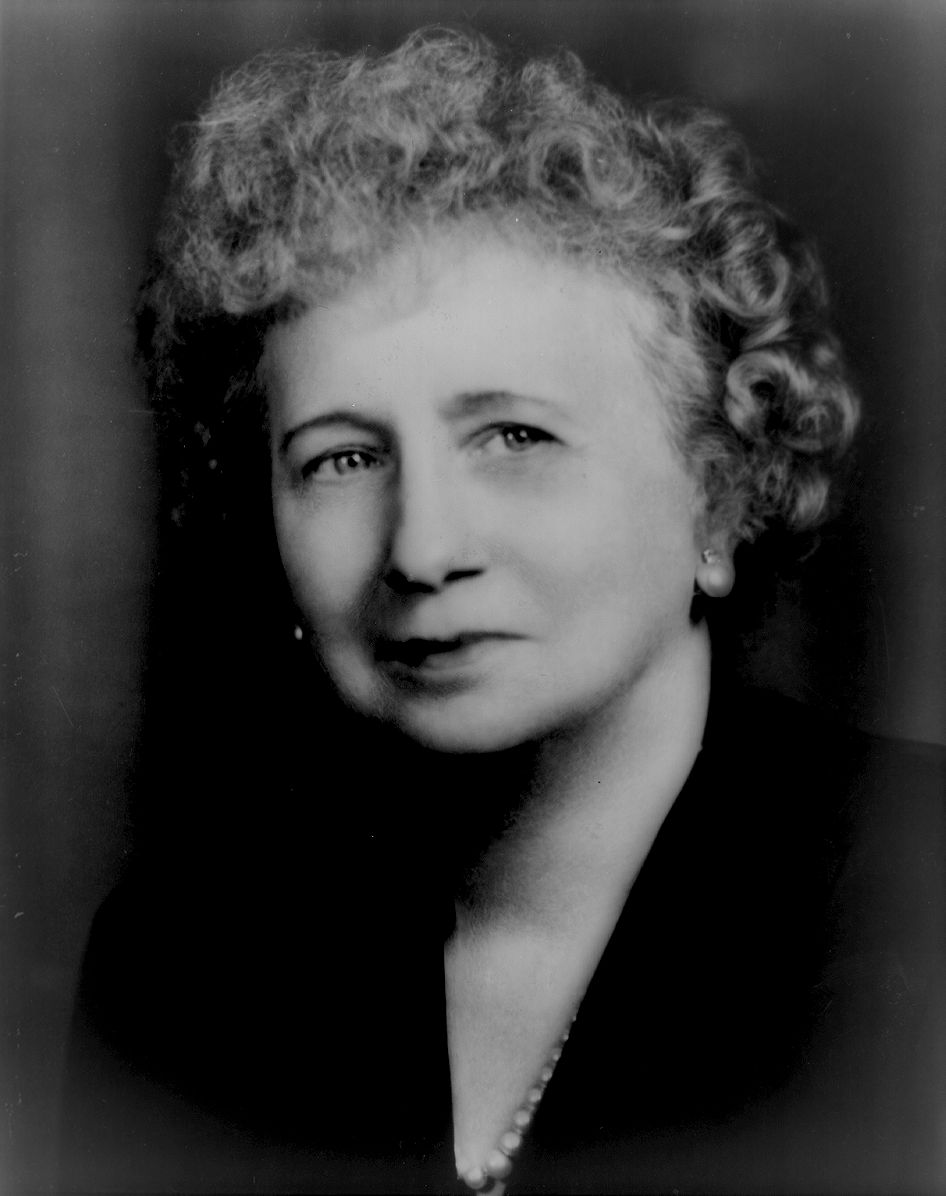
Bess Truman

- February 1 – Friedrich Kellner, German diarist (d. 1970)
- February 7
  - Sinclair Lewis, American writer, Nobel Prize laureate (d. 1951)
  - Hugo Sperrle, German field marshal (d. 1953)
- February 9 – Alban Berg, Austrian composer (d. 1935)
- February 10 – Rupert Downes, Australian general (d. 1945)
- February 13
  - George Fitzmaurice, French-American motion picture director (d. 1940)
  - Bess Truman, First Lady of the United States (d. 1982)
- February 14 – Zengo Yoshida, Japanese admiral (d. 1966)
- February 21 – Sacha Guitry, Russian-born French dramatist, writer, director, and actor (d. 1957)
- February 22 – Pat Sullivan, Australian-born American director, animated film producer (d. 1933)
- February 24
  - Chester W. Nimitz, American admiral (d. 1966)
  - Stanisław Ignacy Witkiewicz, Polish writer, painter (d. 1939)
- February 25
  - Princess Alice of Battenberg (d. 1969)
  - Fritz Skullerud, Norwegian long-distance runner and station master (d. 1969)
- February 26 – Aleksandras Stulginskis, President of Lithuania (d. 1969)

=== March ===
- March 6 – Ring Lardner, American writer (d. 1933)
- March 7 – John Tovey, British admiral of the fleet (d. 1971)
- March 11 – Sir Malcolm Campbell, English land, water racer (d. 1948)
- March 14 – Raoul Lufbery, French-born American World War I pilot (d. 1918)
- March 23 – Mollie McNutt, Australian poet (d. 1919)
- March 27 – Julio Lozano Díaz, President of Honduras (d. 1957)
- March 31 – Jules Pascin, Bulgarian painter (d. 1930)

=== April ===
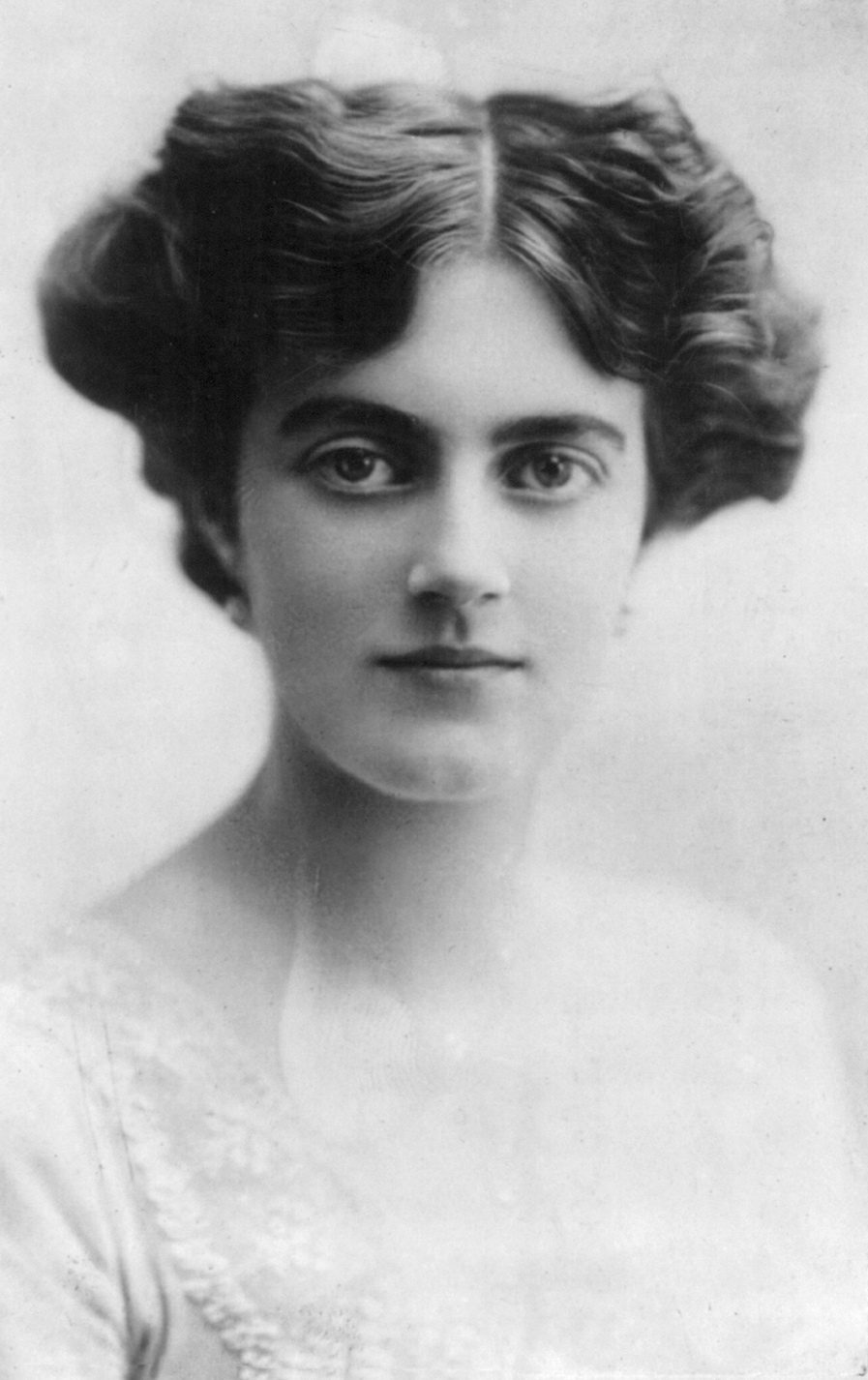
Clementine Churchill

- April 1
  - Wallace Beery, American actor (d. 1949)
  - Clementine Churchill, wife of British Prime Minister Winston Churchill (d. 1977)
- April 3
  - Allan Dwan, Canadian-born American film director (d. 1981)
  - Bud Fisher, American cartoonist (Mutt and Jeff) (d. 1954)
  - St John Philby, Ceylonese-born British orientalist (d. 1960)
- April 12 – Hermann Hoth, German general (d. 1971)
- April 13
  - John Cunningham, British admiral (d. 1962)
  - Otto Plath, American father of poet Sylvia Plath, entomologist (d. 1940)
- April 15 – Tadeusz Kutrzeba, Polish general (d. 1947)
- April 16 – Charles Debbas, 1st president, 5th prime minister of Lebanon (d. 1935)
- April 17 – Karen Blixen, Danish author (d. 1962)
- April 29 – Frank Jack Fletcher, American admiral (d. 1973)

=== May ===
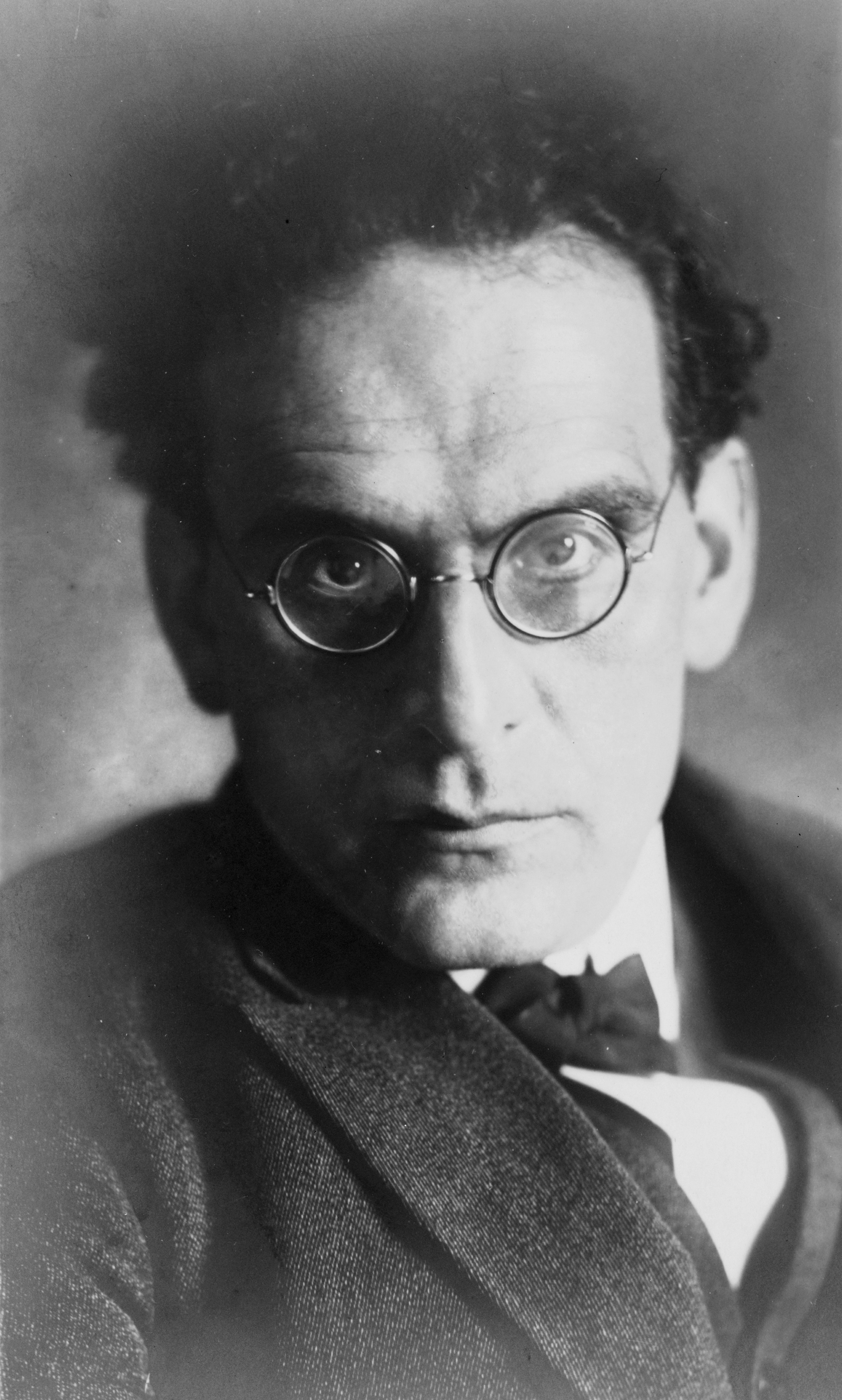
Otto Klemperer

- May 2 – Hedda Hopper, American columnist (d. 1966)
- May 5 – Agustín Barrios, Paraguayan guitarist, composer (d. 1944)
- May 7 – George "Gabby" Hayes, American actor (d. 1969)
- May 8 – Thomas B. Costain, Canadian author and journalist (d. 1965)
- May 9 – Eduard C. Lindeman, American social worker, author (d. 1953)
- May 14 – Otto Klemperer, German conductor (d. 1973)
- May 15
  - Robert James Hudson, Governor of Southern Rhodesia (d. 1963)
  - Naokuni Nomura, Japanese admiral and Minister of the Navy (d. 1973)
- May 20 – Faisal I, King of Iraq (d. 1933)
- May 21 – Sophie, Princess of Albania, consort of William of Wied, Prince of Albania (d. 1936)
- May 22 – Toyoda Soemu, Japanese admiral (d. 1957)
- May 24 – Susan Sutherland Isaacs, English educational psychologist, psychoanalyst (d. 1948)
- May 27 – Richmond K. Turner, American admiral (d. 1961)
- May 30 – Arthur E. Andersen, American accountant (d. 1947)

=== June ===
- June 2 – Hans Gerhard Creutzfeldt, German neuropathologist (d. 1964)
- June 4 – Arturo Rawson, President of Argentina (d. 1952)
- June 5 – Georges Mandel, French politician, World War II hero (d. 1944)
- June 9
  - John Edensor Littlewood, British mathematician (d. 1977)
  - Felicjan Sławoj Składkowski, Prime Minister of Poland (d. 1962)
  - Harry Gribbon, American comedy actor (d. 1961)
- June 19 – Adela Pankhurst, British-Australian suffragette and political activist (d. 1961)
- June 21 – Harry A. Marmer, Ukrainian-born American mathematician, oceanographer (d. 1953)
- June 22 – Milan Vidmar, Slovenian electrical engineer, chess player (d. 1962)
- June 27 – Guilhermina Suggia, Portuguese cellist (d. 1950)
- June 29 – Izidor Kürschner, Hungarian football player and coach (d. 1941)

=== July ===
- July 2 – Nikolai Krylenko, Russian Bolshevik and Soviet politician (d. 1938)
- July 6 – Ernst Busch, German field marshal (d. 1945)
- July 8 – Paul Leni, German film director (The Cat and the Canary) (d. 1929)
- July 9 – Luo Meizhen, Chinese supercentenarian (d. 2013)
- July 14 – King Sisavang Vong of Laos (d. 1959)
- July 15
  - Abd al-Rahman al-Mahdi, 1st prime minister of Sudan (d. 1959)
- July 16 – Hakuun Yasutani, Japanese Sōtō rōshi (d. 1973)
- July 19
  - Dumitru Coroamă, Romanian soldier and fascist activist (d. 1956)
  - Aristides de Sousa Mendes, Portuguese diplomat, humanitarian (d. 1954)
- July 20 – Michitarō Komatsubara, Japanese general (d. 1940)
- July 28 – Monte Attell, American boxer (d. 1960)
- July 29 – Theda Bara, American silent film actress (d. 1955)

=== August ===
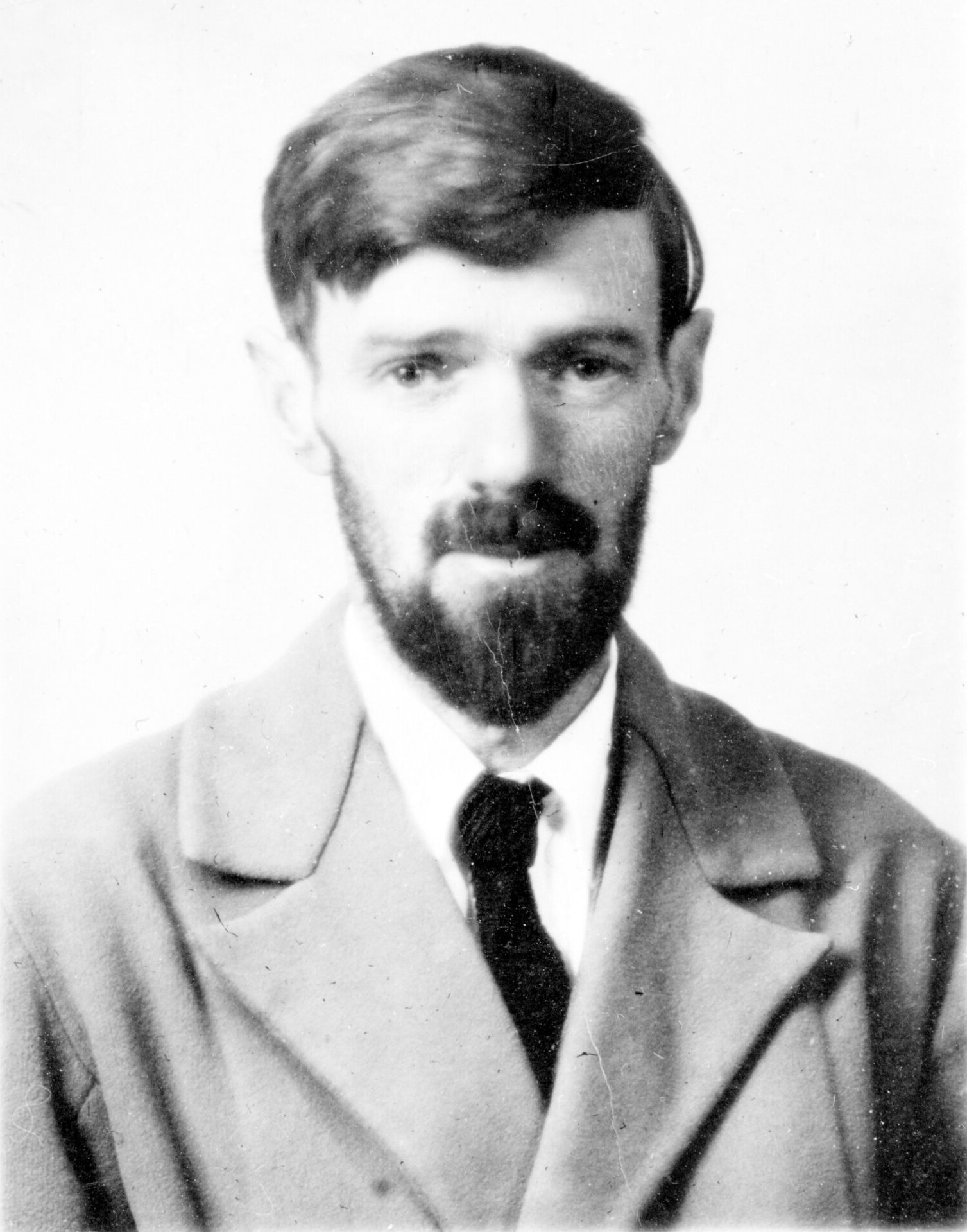
D H Lawrence

- August 1 – George de Hevesy, Hungarian chemist, Nobel Prize laureate (d. 1966)
- August 17 – Ernest Dezentjé, Dutch-Indonesian painter (d. 1972)

=== September ===
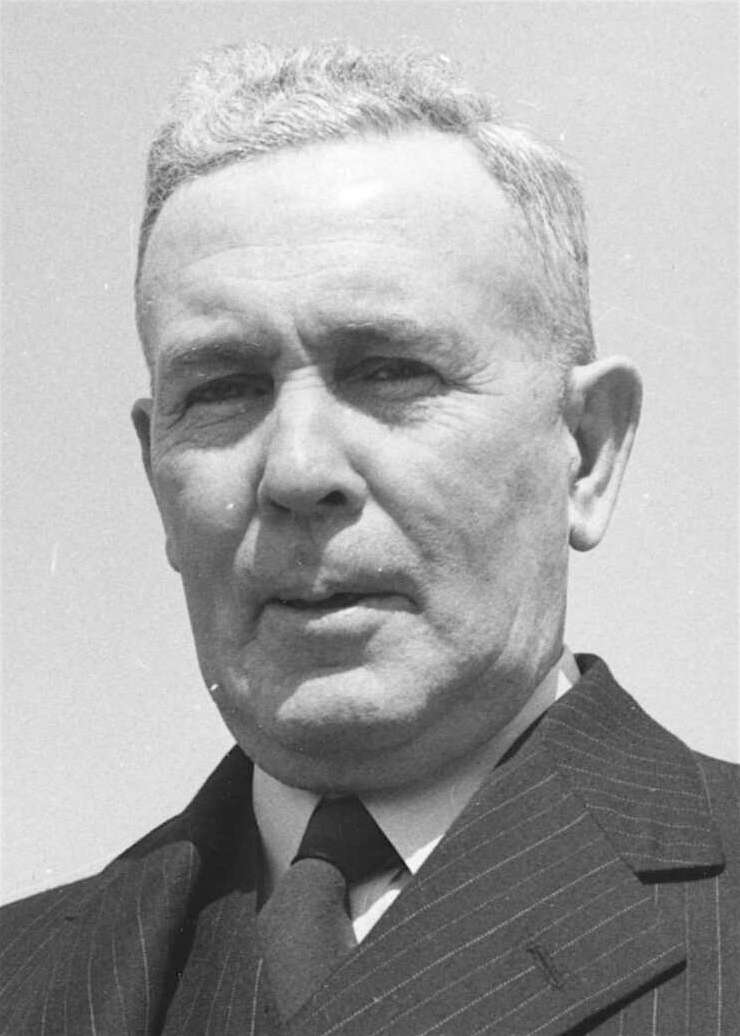
Ben Chifley

- September 6 – Otto Kruger, American actor (d. 1974)
- September 7 – Jovita Idar, Mexican-American journalist and political activist (d. 1946)
- September 11 – D. H. Lawrence, English novelist (d. 1930)
- September 20 – Enrico Mizzi, 6th Prime Minister of Malta (d. 1950)
- September 21 – Thomas de Hartmann, Russian composer (d. 1956)
- September 22
  - Ben Chifley, 16th Prime Minister of Australia (d. 1951)
  - Erich von Stroheim, Austrian-born motion picture actor, director (d. 1957)
- September 25 – Mineichi Koga, Japanese admiral (d. 1944)
- September 27 – Harry Blackstone Sr., American magician and illusionist (d. 1965)

=== October ===
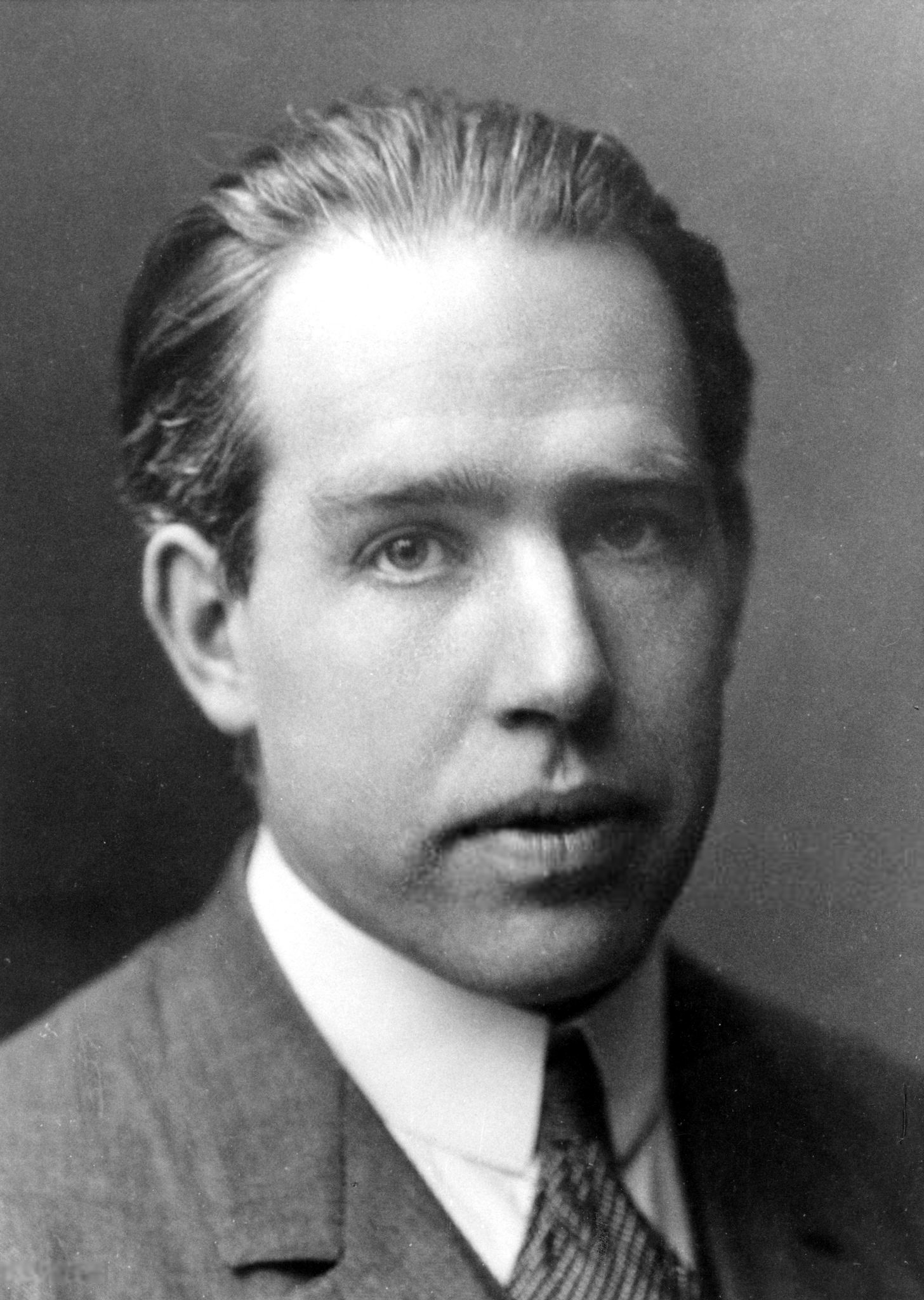
Niels Bohr

- October 3 – Sophie Treadwell, American playwright, journalist (d. 1970)
- October 7 – Niels Bohr, Danish physicist, Nobel Prize laureate (d. 1962)
- October 11 – François Mauriac, French writer, Nobel Prize laureate (d. 1970)
- October 19 – Charles E. Merrill, American banker, co-founder of Merrill Lynch (d. 1956)
- October 24 – Rachel Katznelson-Shazar, Zionist political figure, wife of third President of Israel (d. 1975)
- October 28 – Per Albin Hansson, 2-time prime minister of Sweden (d. 1946)
- October 30 – Ezra Pound, American poet (d. 1972)

=== November ===
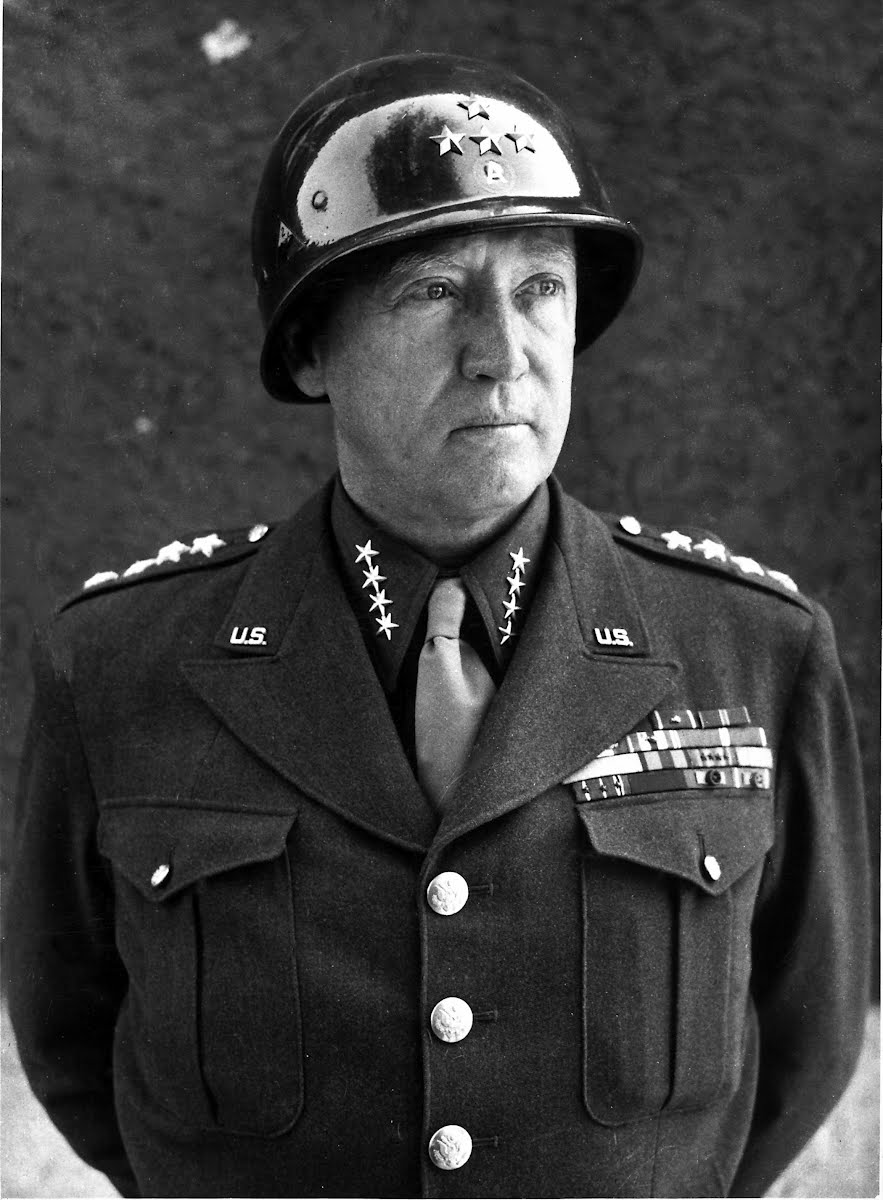
George S. Patton

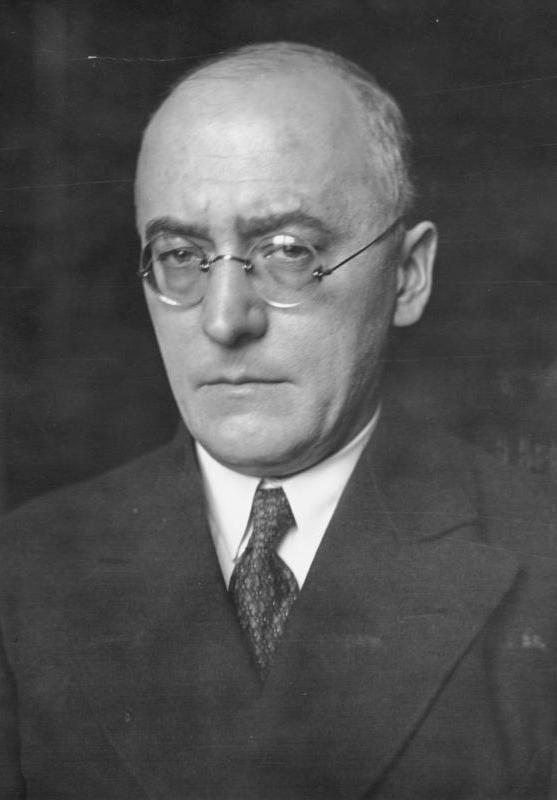
Heinrich Brüning

- November 1 – Anton Flettner, German aviation engineer, inventor (d. 1961)
- November 2 – Harlow Shapley, American astronomer (d. 1972)
- November 5 – Will Durant, American philosopher, writer (d. 1981)
- November 8 – Tomoyuki Yamashita, Japanese general (d. 1946)
- November 9 (October 28 (O.S.)) – Velimir Khlebnikov, Russian poet (d. 1922)
- November 11 – George S. Patton, American general (d. 1945)
- November 15 – Frederick Handley-Page, British aviation pioneer, aircraft company founder (d. 1962)
- November 21 – Edmée Chandon, first professional female astronomer in France, first woman in France to earn a doctorat d'État in mathematics. (d. 1944)
- November 26 – Heinrich Brüning, Chancellor of Germany 1930-1932 (d. 1970)
- November 30
  - Albert Kesselring, German field marshal (d. 1960)
  - Ma Zhanshan, Chinese general (d. 1950)

=== December ===
- December 2 – George Minot, American physician, recipient of the Nobel Prize in Physiology or Medicine (d. 1950)
- December 13 – Mario Talavera, Mexican songwriter (d. 1960)
- December 18 – Walter Crail, American photographer, staff photographer for the Public Ledger (d. 1924)
- December 19
  - John Lavarack, Australian general, Governor of Queensland (1946-1957) (d. 1957)
  - King Oliver, American jazz musician (d. 1938)
- December 22 – Deems Taylor, American composer and music critic (d. 1966)
- December 29 – Eliza Marian Butler, British scholar and writer (d. 1959)

=== Date unknown ===
- Martha, the last Passenger pigeon (d. 1914)
- Geza von Hoffmann, Austrian-Hungarian eugenicist and writer (d. 1921)
- Alessandro Tonini, Italian aeronautical engineer and aircraft designer and manufacturer (d. 1932)

== Deaths ==
=== January–June ===
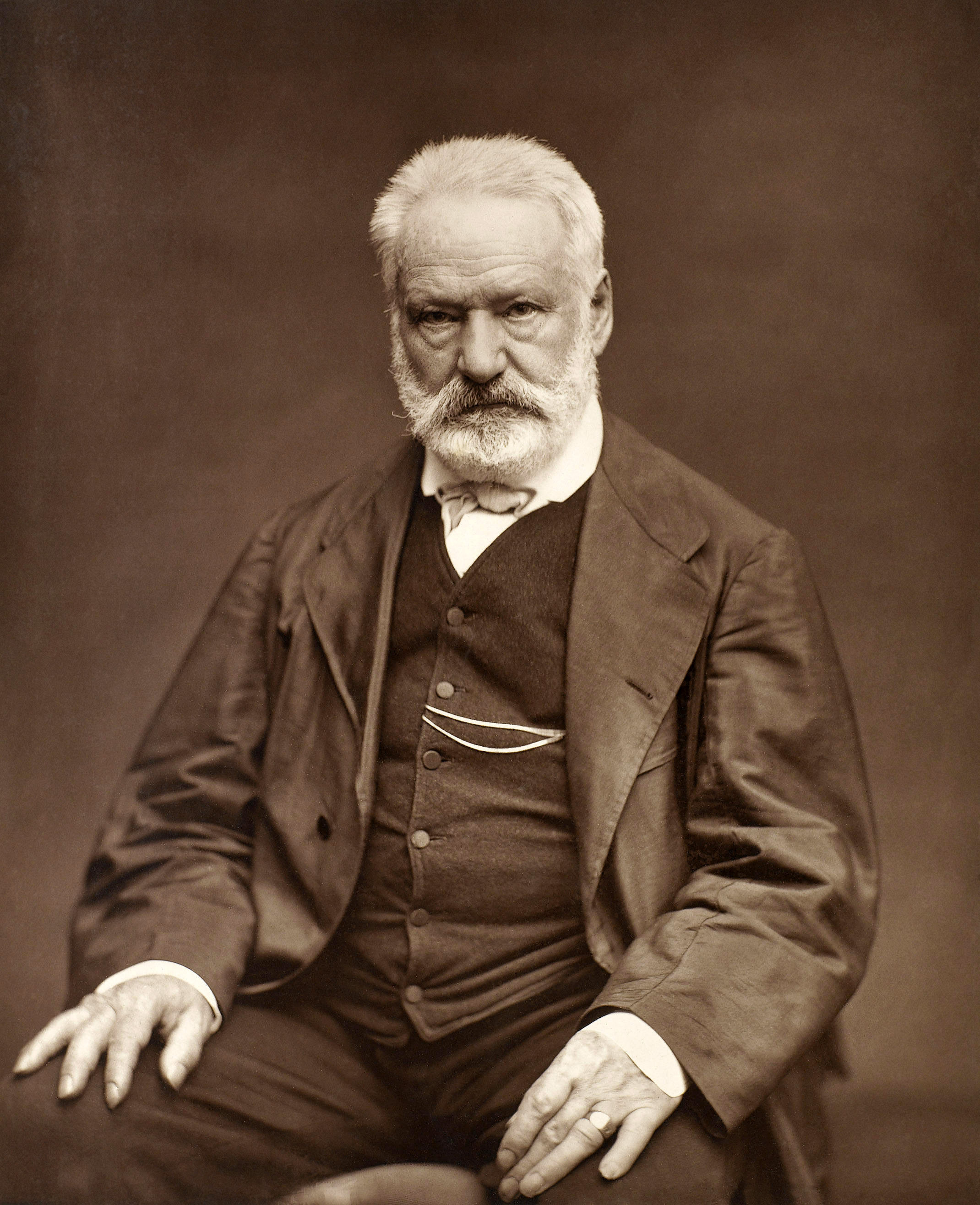
Victor Hugo

- January 11 – Mariano Ospina Rodríguez, President of Colombia (b. 1805)
- January 13 – Schuyler Colfax, 17th Vice President of the United States (b. 1823)
- January 26 – Charles "Chinese" Gordon, British general (killed in battle) (b. 1833)
- February 1 – Sidney Gilchrist Thomas, British inventor (b. 1850)
- February 7 – Iwasaki Yataro, Japanese industrialist, Founder of Mitsubishi (b. 1835)
- February 8 – Nikolai Severtsov, Russian explorer, naturalist (b. 1827)
- February 19 – José María Pinedo, Argentinian naval commander (b. 1795)
- March 12 – Próspero Fernández Oreamuno, President of Costa Rica (b. 1834)
- March 13 – Giorgio Mitrovich, Maltese politician (b. 1795)
- March 22 – Sir Harry Smith Parkes, British diplomat (b. 1828)
- April 2 – Justo Rufino Barrios, Central American leader (b. 1835)
- April 6 – Eduard Vogel von Falckenstein, Prussian general (b. 1797)
- April 25 – Queen Emma of Hawaii (b. 1836)
- May 2 – Terézia Zakoucs, Hungarian Slovene author (b. 1817)
- May 4 – Irvin McDowell, American general (b. 1818)
- May 17 – Jonathan Young, United States Navy commodore (b. 1826)
- May 19 – Robert Emmet Odlum, American swimming instructor (died as result of becoming the first person to jump from the Brooklyn Bridge) (b. 1851)
- May 20 – Frederick Theodore Frelinghuysen, 29th United States Secretary of State (b. 1817)
- May 22 – Victor Hugo, French author (b. 1802)
- June 11 – Amédée Courbet, French admiral (b. 1827)
- June 17 – Edwin Freiherr von Manteuffel, German field marshal (b. 1809)
- June 22 – Muhammad Ahmad, Sudanese Mahdi (b. 1844)

=== July–December ===
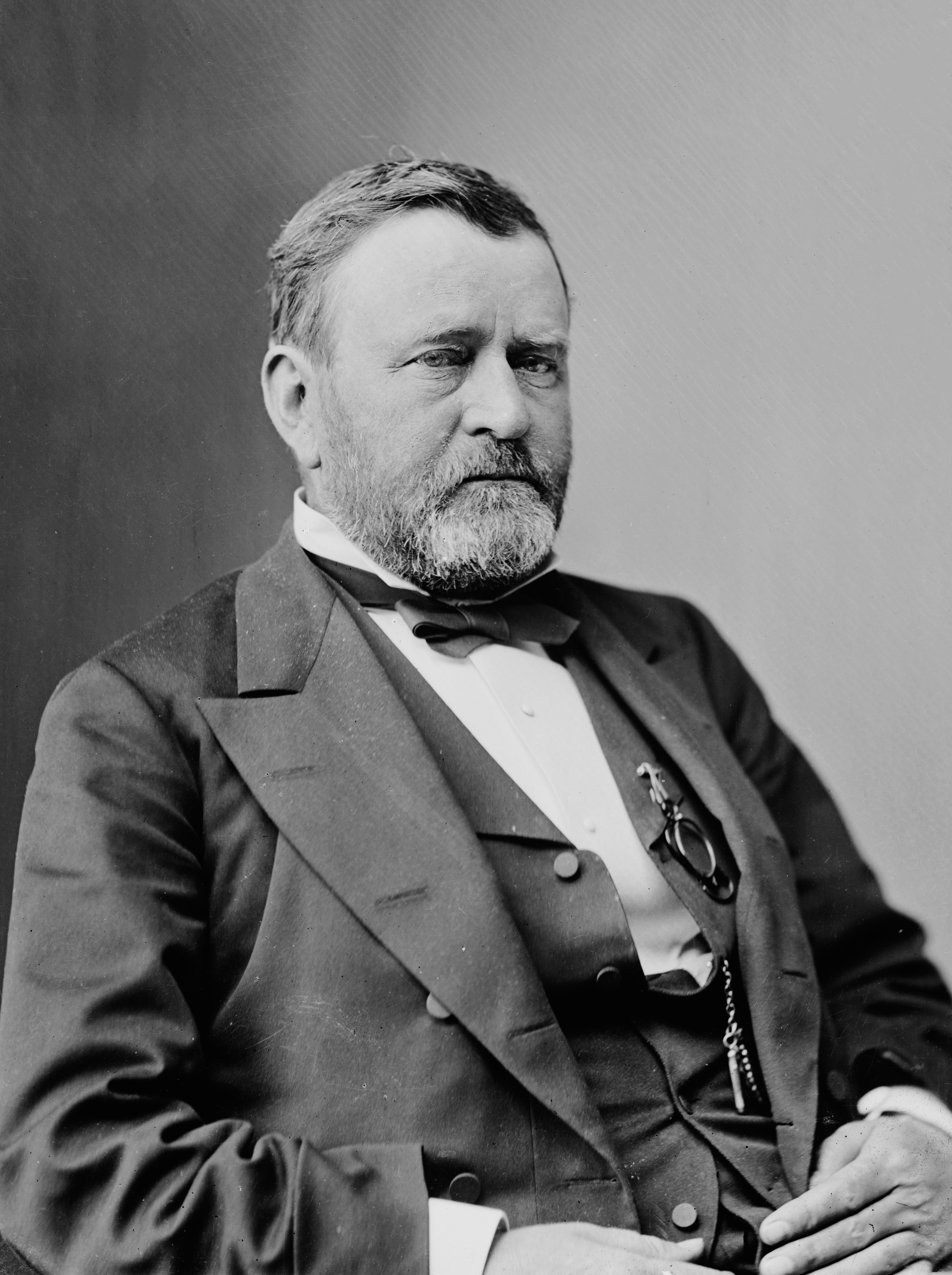
Ulysses S. Grant

- July 21 – Karolina Sobańska, Polish noble, agent (b. 1795)
- July 23 – Ulysses S. Grant, 63, American Civil War general, 18th President of the United States (b. 1822)
- August – Aga Khan II, Iranian religious leader (b. 1830)
- August 6 – Emil Zsigmondy, Austrian mountaineer (b. 1861)
- August 10 – James W. Marshall, American contractor, builder of Sutter's Mill (b. 1810)
- August 29 – Moriz Ludassy, Hungarian journalist (b. 1825)
- September 2 – Giuseppe Bonavia, Maltese architect (b. 1821)
- September 5 – Zuo Zongtang, Chinese general and politician (b. 1812)
- September 6 – Narcís Monturiol, Catalan intellectual, artist and engineer, inventor of the first combustion engine-driven submarine, which was propelled by an early form of air-independent propulsion (b. 1819)
- September 15
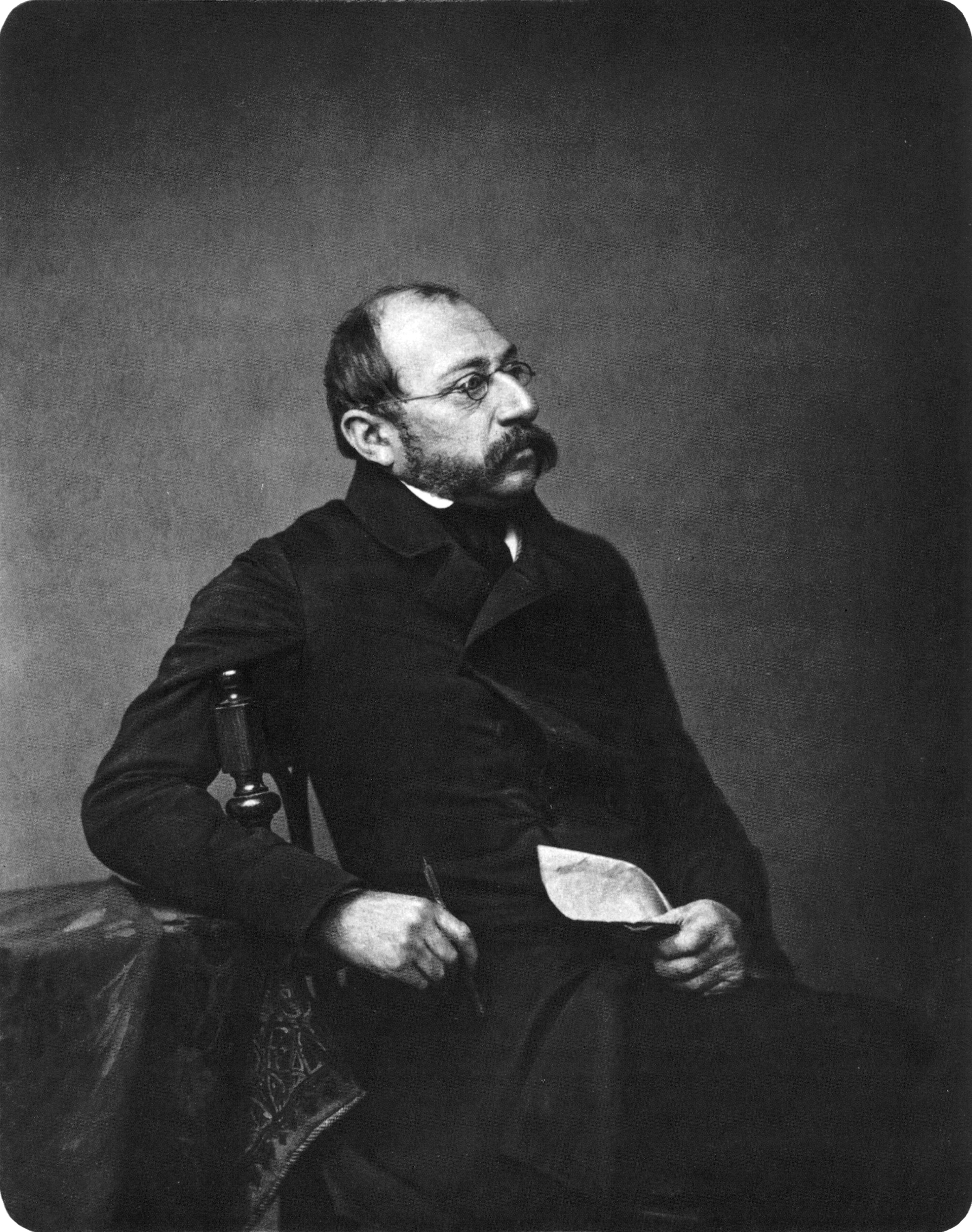
  Carl Spitzweg
  - Jumbo, African elephant, star attraction in P. T. Barnum's circus (train accident) (b. 1861)
  - Carl Spitzweg, German romanticist painter (b. 1808)
- October 1 – Anthony Ashley-Cooper, 7th Earl of Shaftesbury, British politician and philanthropist (b.1801)
- October 3 – Mazhar Nanautawi, Indian freedom struggle activist and founding figure of Mazahir Uloom (b. 1821)
- October 5 – Thomas C. Durant, American railroad financier (b. 1820)
- October 29
  - George B. McClellan, American Civil War general, politician (b. 1826)
  - Juan Bautista Topete, Spanish admiral and politician (b. 1821)
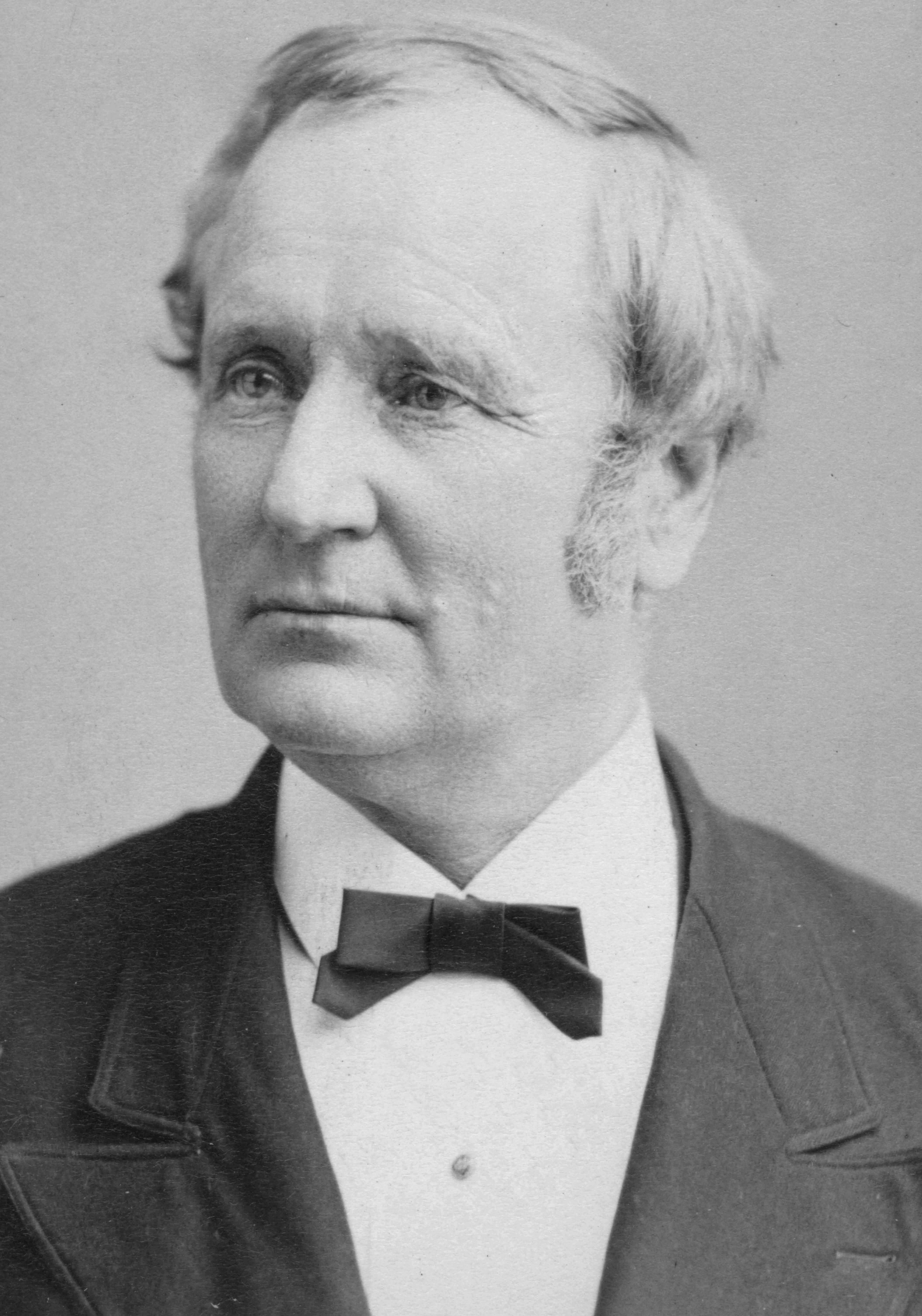
- Thomas A. Hendricks
  November 16 – Louis Riel, Canadian-American leader (executed) (b. 1844)
- November 8 – John McCullough, Irish-American actor (b. 1832)
- November 24 – Nicolás Avellaneda, Argentine president (b. 1837)
- November 25
  - King Alfonso XII of Spain (b. 1857)
  - Thomas A. Hendricks, 21st Vice President of the United States (b. 1819)
- November 26 – Thomas Andrews, Irish chemist (b. 1813)
- December 8 – William Henry Vanderbilt, American entrepreneur (b. 1821)
- December 13 – Benjamin Gratz Brown, American politician (b. 1826)
- December 15 – Ferdinand II of Portugal, consort of Queen Maria II (b. 1816)

=== Date unknown ===
- Eugenia Kisimova, Bulgarian feminist, philanthropist and women's rights activist (b. 1831)

== In fiction ==
- September 2–September 7 – The film Back to the Future Part III takes place during this time. Dr. Emmett Brown is initially murdered by Buford "Mad Dog" Tannen in Hill Valley, California (1885); however, Marty McFly later prevents this murder.
- The stage "Bury My Shell at Wounded Knee", in the 1992 video game Teenage Mutant Ninja Turtles: Turtles in Time, is set in this year.
- The Nickelodeon TV movie, Lost in the West, takes place in this year.
- The plot of An American Tail is set in this period.
- Stephen Gordon, protagonist of The Well of Loneliness, is born on 24 December 1885.
