= Mauricio =

- Pronunciation: Spanish pronunciation: [mawˈɾiθjo] Latin American Spanish: [mawˈɾisjo] Portuguese pronunciation: [mawˈɾisiu]
- Gender: Male
- Language: Spanish, Portuguese

Origin
- Region of origin: Spain, Portugal

Other names
- Related names: Maurice, Maurizio, Mauro

Mauricio is a Spanish and Portuguese masculine given name, equivalent to English Maurice and derived from the Roman Mauritius. It is of Latin origin, and its meaning is "dark-skinned, Moorish".

The following are the equivalents in other languages:

- Maurice, English
- Morris, English
- Maurício, Portuguese
- Maurice, French
- Moritz, German
- Maurizio, Italian
- Maurits, Dutch

== People ==
- Mauricio Borensztein (1927–1996), Argentine comedian known on stage as "Tato Bores"
- Mauricio Carlos de Onís y Mercklein (1790–1861), Spanish politician and diplomat
- Mauricio Cienfuegos (born 1968), El Salvadoran footballer
- Mauricio Funes (born 1959), president of El Salvador from 2009 to 2014
- Mauricio González-Gordon y Diez (1923–2013), Spanish sherry maker and conservationist
- Mauricio Hadad (born 1971), Colombian tennis player
- Mauricio Islas (born 1973), Mexican actor
- Mauricio Kagel (1931–2008), German-Argentine composer
- Mauricio Lomonte (born 1982), Cuban radio announcer and television host
- Mauricio Ortega (discus thrower) (born 1994), Colombian discus thrower
- Mauricio Ortega (cyclist) (born 1980), Colombian road cyclist
- Mauricio Pochettino (born 1972), football coach
- Mauricio Pellegrino (born 1971), Argentine retired footballer and manager
- Mauricio Pinilla (born 1984), Chilean footballer
- Mauricio Soler (born 1983), Colombian professional road bicycle racer
- Maurício Rua (born 1981), Brazilian mixed martial arts fighter
- Mauricio de Zúñiga (died 1816), Spanish Governor of La Florida in 1812–1813 and 1816
- Mauricio de Sousa (born 1935), Brazilian cartoonist
- Mauricio de María y Campos (1943–2021), Mexican ambassador
- Mauricio Macri (born 1959) President of Argentina from 2015 to 2019
- Mauricio Zamora, Bolivian politician
- Mauricio Garcia (born 1999), Rally House Store 293 Head Coach 2024 to Present
