= Maurizio =

- Pronunciation: Italian: [mauˈrittsjo]
- Gender: Male

Origin
- Meaning: Dark-skinned, Moorish
- Region of origin: Italy

Other names
- Related names: Mauricio, Spanish; Maurice, French; Maurits, Dutch; Maurycy, Polish; Μαυρίκιος (Mavrikios), Greek; Маврикий (Mavrikiy), Russian; Meurig, Welsh; Moritz, German; Morris, English; Muiris, Irish

Maurizio is an Italian masculine given name, derived from the Roman name Mauritius. Mauritius is a derivative of Maurus, meaning dark-skinned, Moorish.

== List of people with the given name Maurizio ==
=== Art and music ===
- Maurizio Arcieri (born 1945), singer
- Maurizio Bianchi (born 1955), pioneer of noise music
- Maurizio Cattelan (born 1960), artist
- Maurizio Cazzati (1616–1678), composer
- Maurizio Colasanti (born 1966), conductor
- Maurizio De Jorio (born 1968), italo disco and Eurobeat musician
- Maurizio Lobina (born 1973), keyboardist
- Maurizio Pollini (born 1942), classical pianist
- Maurizio, minimal techno production duo
- Maurizio Iacono (born 1975), singer for Death Metal band Kataklysm

=== Film, television, and media ===
- Maurizio Costanzo (born 1938), television personality
- Maurizio De Santis, film producer
- Maurizio Giuliano (born 1975), writer and journalist
- Maurizio Merli (1940–1989), film actor
- Maurizio Nichetti (born 1948), film screenwriter, actor and director
- Maurizio Pagnussat (born 1955), television director
- Maurizio Romano (1966–2003), voice actor
- Maurizio Silvi, Italian make-up artist

=== Military and politics ===
- Maurizio Bevilacqua (born 1960), Canadian politician
- Maurizio Cheli (born 1959), air force officer and ESA astronaut
- Maurizio Cocciolone (born 1960), Italian Air Force officer who served with UN Coalition forces
- Maurizio Galbaio (died 787), seventh traditional and fifth historical Doge of Venice
- Maurizio Gasparri (born 1956), politician
- Maurizio Giglio (1920–1944), Italian soldier, policeman and secret agent for the Allies during World War II
- Maurizio Lupi (born 1959), Italian politician
- Maurizio Pagani (1936–2014), Italian engineer and politician
- Maurizio Valenzi (1909–2009), Italian politician

=== Sports ===
- Maurizio Anastasi (born 1977), football midfielder
- Maurizio Arrivabene (born 1957), Italian Team Principal of Scuderia Ferrari (2014–2019)
- Maurizio Bormolini (born 1994), Italian snowboarder
- Maurizio Ciaramitaro (born 1982), football midfielder
- Maurizio Damilano (born 1957), former race walker
- Maurizio Domizzi (born 1980), football defender
- Maurizio Fondriest (born 1965), retired road racing cyclist
- Maurizio Ganz (born 1968), former football forward
- Maurizio Gaudino (born 1966), German retired football midfielder
- Maurizio Gherardini (born 1955), sportsman
- Maurizio Lanzaro (born 1982), footballer
- Maurizio Marchetto (born 1956), former ice speed skater
- Maurizio Margaglio (born 1974), ice dancer
- Maurizio Mariani (born 1982), football referee
- Maurizio Oioli (born 1981), male skeleton racer
- Maurizio Perissinot (1951–2004), rally co-driver
- Maurizio Sarri (born 1959), Football coach
- Maurizio Stecca (born 1963), former boxer
- Maurizio Zaffiri (born 1978), rugby player

=== Other ===
- Maurizio Di Gati (born 1966), Sicilian mafioso
- Maurizio Gucci (1948–1995), businessman
- Maurizio Minghella (born 1958), serial killer
- Maurizio Molinari (born 1964), journalist
- Maurizio Zamparini (born 1941), businessman

== List of people with the family name Maurizio ==
- Adam Maurizio (1862–1941), Swiss botanist and food technologist.
