= Mauritz =

Mauritz is a variant spelling of Maurits. Notable people with the name include:

- Mauritz Andersson (1886–1971), Swedish wrestler
- Gustaf Mauritz Armfelt (1757–1814), Finnish courtier and diplomat
- Mauritz Brännström (1918–2006), Swedish cross-country skier
- Mauritz Carlsson (1890–1953), Swedish track and field athlete
- Mauritz Eriksson (1888–1947), Swedish sport shooter
- Mauritz de Haas (1832–1895), Dutch-American marine painter
- Mauritz Johansson (1881–1966), Swedish sport shooter
- Mauritz Kåshagen (born 1989), Norwegian sprinter
- Wilhelm Mauritz Klingspor (1744–1814), Swedish noble military officer
- Kristian Mauritz Mustad (1848–1913), Norwegian politician for the Liberal Party
- Mauritz Rosenberg (1879–1941), Finnish politician
- Mauritz Stiller (1883–1928), Finnish Jewish actor, screenwriter and silent film director
- Mauritz von Wiktorin (1883–1956), Austrian general during World War II

== See also ==
- Mauritz Widforss, Stockholm hunting equipment store, merged to become Hennes & Mauritz and later H&M
- Maurits (disambiguation)
- Moritz (disambiguation)
- Moriz
