= Maurits =

Maurits is the Dutch equivalent of the masculine given name Maurice. People with the name include:

== Royalty ==
- Prince Maurice of Nassau, (1567–1625), military leader of the Dutch Republic, son of William I of Orange
- Count John Maurice of Nassau, (1604–1679) also known as 'the Brazilian'
- Prince Maurice of the Netherlands (1843–1850), second son of King William III
- Prince Maurits of Orange-Nassau, van Vollenhoven (born 1968)

== Other people ==
- Maurits, pseudonym of Paulus Adrianus Daum (1850–1898), Dutch author
- Maurits Allessie (born 1945), Dutch physiologist
- Maurits de Baar (born 1997), Dutch footballer
- Maurits Basse (1868–1944), Belgian writer and teacher
- Maurits Binger (1868–1923), Dutch film director
- Maurits van den Boogert (born 1972), Dutch historian of the Ottoman Empire
- Maurits Caransa (1916–2009), Dutch real-estate developer and kidnapping victim
- Maurits Coppieters (1920–2005), Belgian politician
- Maurits Crucq (born 1968), Dutch field hockey player
- Maurits De Schrijver (born 1951), Belgian football player
- Maurits Dekker (1896–1962), Dutch novelist
- Maurits Cornelis Escher (1898–1972), Dutch graphic artist
- Maurits Gysseling (1919–1997), Belgian researcher
- Maurits Frederik Hendrik de Haas (1832–1895), Dutch-American marine painter
- Maurits van Hall (1836–1900), Dutch lawyer, banker, and politician
- Maurits Hansen (1794–1842), Norwegian writer
- Maurits Hendriks (born 1961), Dutch field hockey coach
- Maurits Jonkman (born 1986), Dutch cricket player
- Maurits Lammertink (born 1990), Dutch racing cyclist
- Maurits Lieftinck (1904–1985), Dutch zoologist
- Maurits Lindström (1932–2009), a Swedish geologist
- Maurits van Löben Sels (1876–1944), Dutch fencer
- Maurits Niekerk (1871–1940), Dutch impressionist painter
- Maurits van Nierop (1983–2008), Dutch cricket player
- Maurits Pasques de Chavonnes (1654–1724), Dutch Governor of the Cape Colony
- Maurits Post (1645–1677), Dutch architect
- Maurits van Rooijen (born 1956), Dutch social and economic historian
- Maurits Sabbe (1873–1938), Belgian writer
- Maurits Schmitz (born 1993), Dutch football player
- Maurits Snellen (1840–1907), Dutch meteorologist and polar explorer

== Other ==
- the Mauritshuis, a museum in The Hague, which was built by John Maurice of Nassau
- Staatsmijn Maurits, a state-owned coal mine in Geleen, Netherlands
- Mauritsstad, capital of Dutch Brazil and is now a part of Recife

== See also ==
- Maurice (disambiguation)
- Mauritius (island)
- Mauritz
