= Mauricio Ortega =

Mauricio Ortega may refer to:

- Mauricio Ortega (cyclist) (born 1980), Colombian road cyclist
- Mauricio Ortega (discus thrower) (born 1994), Colombian discus thrower

== See also ==
- Mauricio
- Ortega
