= Moric =

Moric, Móric and Mořic is a surname and a given name, a variant of English Maurice and German Moritz. Notable people with the name include:

== Given name ==
- Maurice Benyovszky (Hungarian: Móric Benyovszky; 1746–1786), Hungarian military officer, adventurer and writer
- Móric Esterházy (1881–1960), Hungarian aristocrat and politician
- Móric Fischer de Farkasházy (1799–1880), Hungarian porcelain manufacturer
- František Mořic Nágl (1889–1944), Czech painter
- Móric Pogány (1878–1942), Hungarian Jewish architect
- Moric Levi (1878–1941), Bosnian Jewish rabbi

== Surname ==
- Ante Moric (born 1974), Australian soccer player and coach
- Rajmund Moric (born 1944), Polish politician

== See also ==
- Nina Morić (born 1976), Croatian fashion model
