= Moritz (name) =

Moritz is a given name and a surname. It is a German equivalent of the name Maurice. Notable people with the name include:

== Given name ==
- Saint Maurice, also called Saint Moritz, Roman Theban Legion leader
- Prince Moritz of Anhalt-Dessau (1712–1760), German prince
- Moritz, Landgrave of Hesse (1926–2013), German nobleman
- Moritz, Prince of Dietrichstein (1775–1864), German prince
- Moritz Becker (1827–1906), American politician
- Moritz Benedikt (1849–1920), Jewish-Austrian newspaper editor
- Moritz Borman (born 1955), German-born American film producer
- Moritz Michael Daffinger (1790–1849), Austrian miniature painter and sculptor
- Moritz Duschak (1815–1890), Moravian rabbi and writer
- Moritz Grünwald (1853–1895), Bulgarian chief rabbi
- Moritz Kalthoff (born 1992), German politician
- Moritz Körner (born 1990), German politician
- Moritz von Oswald (born 1962), German record producer and percussionist
- Moritz Schlick (1882–1936), German philosopher and physicist
- Moritz von Schwind (1804–1871), Austrian painter
- Moritz Seider (born 2001), German ice hockey player
- Moritz Steinla (1791–1858), German engraver
- Moritz Wagner (basketball) (born 1997), German basketball player
- Moritz Wagner (naturalist) (1813–1887), German explorer, collector, geographer and natural historian

== Surname ==
- A. F. Moritz (born 1947), American poet, teacher and scholar
- André Moritz (born 1986), Brazilian attacking midfielder
- Bruno Moritz (1900–?), German-Ecuadorian chess master
- Carl Moritz (1863–1944), German architect and real estate entrepreneur
- Christoph Moritz (born 1990), German footballer
- Halvar Moritz (1906–1993), Swedish cross-country skier
- Helmut Moritz (1933–2022), Austrian geodeticist
- Jacob Moritz (1849–1910), German-born American brewer
- Julius L. and Morris Moritz (1830–1909 and (c. 1836–1903), German-born American retail merchants
- Karl Philipp Moritz (1756–1793), German author, editor and essayist
- Louisa Moritz (1936–2019), Cuban-born American actress
- Mathias Moritz (born 1988), German footballer
- Michael Moritz (born 1954), Welsh venture capitalist
- Nancy Moritz (born 1960), American judge
- Neal H. Moritz (born 1959), American film producer
- Nils Moritz (born 1943), Swedish actor
- Paulus Moritz (1869–1942), German Roman Catholic cleric
- Robert Edouard Moritz (1868–1940), German-American mathematician
- Sabine Moritz (born 1969), German painter and graphic designer
- Theodore L. Moritz (1892–1982), American politician
- Wilhelm Moritz (1913–2010), German fighter pilot

== Fictional characters ==
- a title character of Max and Moritz, an 1865 German-language illustrated story by Wilhelm Busch
- Moritz Stiefel, lead male role in the Broadway musical Spring Awakening
- Moritz Benayoun, human male doctor on the TV series Star Trek: Picard

== See also ==
- Moritz (disambiguation)
- Yunna Morits (born 1937), Soviet and Russian poet
