= Peter Maurice (priest) =

Welsh priest and writer

Peter Maurice (29 June 1803 – 30 March 1878) was a Welsh priest and writer.

Maurice was the second son of Hugh Maurice, a transcriber of Welsh manuscripts. He was born at Plas Gwyn, Llanrug, north Wales. He matriculated at Jesus College, Oxford in 1822, obtaining his Bachelor of Arts degree in 1826, a Master of Arts degree in 1829, a Bachelor of Divinity degree in 1837 and a Doctor of Divinity degree in 1840. He was ordained deacon in January 1827 and priest in October the same year. He was curate of Llanbedr and Caerhun, later becoming chaplain of New College, Oxford (1828–1858) and of All Souls College, Oxford (1837–1858). From 1858 until his death on 30 March 1878, he was vicar of Yarnton, Oxfordshire. He wrote on church music, composing hymns in addition, and wrote pamphlets against Popery.
