= Moriz =

Moriz is a masculine given name which may refer to:

- Moriz Haupt (1808–1874), German philologist
- Moriz Heider (1816–1866), Austrian dentist
- Moriz Henneberger (1878–1959), Swiss chess master
- Moriz von Kuffner (1854–1939), Jewish-Austrian industrialist, art collector, mountaineer and philanthropist
- Moriz Lieber (1790–1860), German Catholic politician and publisher
- Moriz Ludassy (1825–1885), Hungarian journalist
- Moriz von Lyncker (1853–1932), Prussian officer and Chief of the Military Cabinet of Kaiser Wilhelm II
- Moriz Pollack von Borkenau (1827–1904), Jewish-Austrian financier
- Moriz Probst (1867–1923), Austrian psychiatrist and neuroanatomist
- Moriz Rosenthal (1862–1946), Jewish-American pianist of Austro-Hungarian origin
- Moriz Scheyer (1886–1949), Austrian author
- Moriz Seeler (1896–1942), German poet, writer, film producer and man of the theatre
- Moriz Winternitz (1863–1937), Austrian Orientalist

== See also ==
- Moritz (disambiguation)
