= Maurice Evans =

Maurice Evans may refer to:

- Maurice Evans (footballer, born 1859) (1859–?), Oswestry Town and Wales international footballer
- Maurice Evans (footballer, born 1936) (1936–2000), British football player and manager
- Maurice Evans (actor) (1901–1989), British-American actor
- Maurice Evans (basketball) (born 1978), American basketball player
- Maurice Evans (American football) (born 1988), American football defensive end
