= Māris =

Male given name

- Gender: Male
- Name day: 22 September

Origin
- Origin: derived either from Morics or Māra
- Region of origin: Latvia

Other names
- Related names: Mārcis

Māris is a Latvian masculine given name, a cognate of the English Maurice and may refer to:

- Māris Ārbergs (born 1962), Latvian politician
- Māris Bogdanovičs (born 1991), Latvian cyclist
- Māris Bičevskis (born 1991), Latvian ice hockey player
- Māris Bružiks (born 1962), Latvian triple jumper
- Māris Čaklais (1940–2003), Latvian poet, writer, and journalist
- Māris Diļevka (born 1992), Latvian ice hockey player
- Māris Gailis (born 1951), Latvian politician, former Prime Minister of Latvia
- Māris Grīnblats (1955–2021), Latvian politician
- Māris Gulbis (born 1985), Latvian basketball player
- Māris Jass (born 1985), Latvian ice hockey forward
- Māris Jučers (born 1987), Latvian ice hockey goaltender
- Māris Krakops (born 1978), Latvian chess Grandmaster
- Māris Kučinskis (born 1961), Latvian politician
- Māris Ļaksa (born 1981), Latvian basketball player
- Māris Liepa (1936–1989), Latvian-Soviet ballet dancer
- Māris Martinsons (born 1960), Latvian film director, producer and screenwriter
- Māris Poikāns (born 1962), Latvian bobsledder
- Māris Purgailis (born 1947), Latvian politician
- Māris Riekstiņš (born 1963), Latvian politician and diplomat
- Māris Smirnovs (born 1976) Latvian football defender
- Māris Štrombergs (born 1987) Latvian professional BMX racer and Olympic gold medalist
- Māris Urtāns (born 1981), Latvian shot putter
- Māris Verpakovskis (born 1979), Latvian football forward
- Māris Ziediņš (born 1978), Latvian ice hockey forward
- Māris Ziediņš (born 1990), basketball player

== See also ==
- Maris (disambiguation)
- Mariss Jansons
- Mariss Vētra
