= Maurits Niekerk =

Dutch painter (1871–1940)

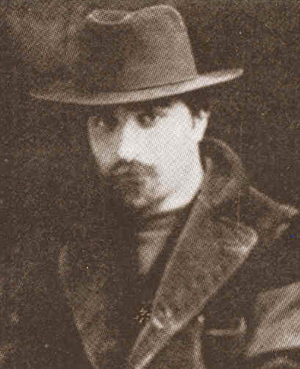
Maurits Niekerk (c.1895)

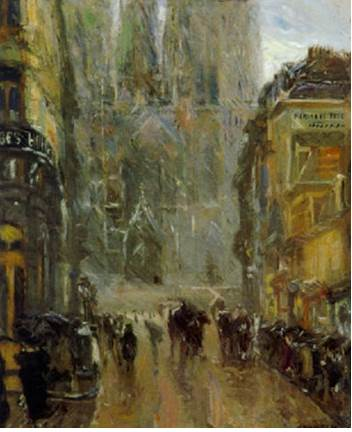
Boulevard in the Rain

Maurits Joseph Niekerk (11 September 1871, Amsterdam – 20 March 1940, Paris) was a Dutch Impressionist painter of Jewish ancestry who spent much of his career in Belgium.

== Biography ==
From 1887 to 1893, he studied at the Rijksakademie in Amsterdam, then spent some time at the Royal Academy of Fine Arts in Antwerp. During his studies in Antwerp, he paid a visit to Bruges, where he met Valerius de Saedeleer, who introduced him to the artists' colony in Sint-Martens-Latem.

He was impressed by the area and bought a small farm nearby, where he lived until 1903. His paintings during this period were, however, very brightly colored, unlike the darker style practiced by the Latemse school. They were mostly landscapes and still-lifes, although he also painted interiors; often slum dwellings occupied by peasants and beggars. His friend, Karel van de Woestijne, wrote several articles about him for Elseviers Geïllustreerd Maandblad.

He was also an art critic and writer, including a notable article titled Hulde aan E. Zola: een semiet over de zaak Dreyfus (Tribute to Emile Zola, a Semite on the Dreyfus Affair).

He travelled extensively, making long visits to Germany and Italy. In 1903, he moved to Brussels and painted scenes of city life. Later, he moved to Paris. Despite his long absence from the Netherlands, many of his works may be seen at the Museum Boijmans Van Beuningen and the Royal Museum of Fine Arts Antwerp.
