= Maurits de Baar =

Dutch footballer

Personal information
- Date of birth: 8 October 1997 (age 29)
- Place of birth: Utrecht, Netherlands
- Position: Right winger

Team information
- Current team: SVL Langbroek

Youth career
- DVSU
- SV CDW
- 2008–2013: Den Bosch
- 2013–2016: Elinkwijk

Senior career*
Years	Team	Apps	(Gls)
2016–2018	RKC	10	(0)
2018–2019	Lienden	12	(2)
2019	Hercules	2	(0)
2019–2021	Sparta Nijkerk		
2021	Bussum		
2021–2022	DUNO		
2022–2023	DHSC		
2023–2025	Hoogland		
2025-	SVL Langbroek		
- * Club domestic league appearances and goals as of 22 November 2024

Maurits de Baar (born 8 October 1997) is a Dutch footballer who plays as a winger for Dutch amateur side SVL Langbroek.

== Club career ==
He made his professional debut in the Eerste Divisie for RKC Waalwijk on 8 August 2016 in a game against SC Telstar.

On 11 January 2019, de Baar left FC Lienden to join USV Hercules. After six months at Hercules, he moved to Sparta Nijkerk in the Derde Divisie.

De Baar joined SVL Langbroek after leaving VV Hoogland. He lives in Wijk bij Duurstede and works at a medical congress bureau.
