= Mārcis =

Male given name

- Gender: Male
- Name day: 10 November

Origin
- Region of origin: Latvia

Other names
- Related names: Māris

Mārcis is a Latvian masculine given name and may refer to:

- Mārcis Auziņš (born 1956), Latvian physicist
- Mārcis Ošs (born 1991), Latvian footballer
- Mārcis Rullis (born 1979), Latvian bobsledder
- Mārcis Štrobinders (born 1966), Latvian track and field athlete
