= Moritz Duschak =

Austrian rabbi & author (1815–1890)

- Born: 14 November 1815; Triesch, Moravia, Austrian Empire
- Died: 21 July 1890 (aged 74); Vienna, Austria-Hungary
- Education: University of Prague
- Writing career
- Language: German

Moritz Mordechai Duschak (Hebrew: מרדכי דושאק; 14 November 1815 – 21 July 1890) was an Austrian rabbi and author.

== Biography ==
Moritz Duschak was born in Triesch, Moravia, on 14 November 1815. At the age of thirteen he went to Trebitsch, where he studied under Joachim Pollak. He was later a pupil in Talmud of Moses Sofer of Presburg, and studied at the University of Prague.

Duschak was for a long time rabbi in the Moravian towns of Aussee and Gaya. In 1877 he became preacher in Cracow and teacher of religion at the gymnasium of that city. After several years' service he left Cracow and settled in Vienna, where he spent his last days in neglect.

== Publications ==
- Die Theilnahme an dem Schicksale unserer Brüder. Prague: W. Pascheles. 1847.
- Umriss des biblisch-talmudischen Synagogen-Rechtes mit Rücksicht auf die jetzige Stellung der österreichischen Juden. Olmütz: E. Hölzel. 1853. hdl:2027/njp.32101065415331.
- Mor Deror. Vienna. 1864. On Josephus and tradition.
- Das Mosaisch-Talmudische Eherecht mit Besonderer Rücksicht auf die Bürgerlichen Gesetze. Vienna: W. Braumüller. 1864.
- Gideon Brecher, eine Biographische Skizze. Prossnitz. 1865.
- Geschichte und Darstellung des Jüdischen Cultus. Mannheim: J. Schneider. 1866.
- Das Mosaisch-Talmudische Strafrecht. Vienna: W. Braumüller. 1869. hdl:2027/hvd.ah573f.
- Zur Botanik des Talmuds. Pest: I. Neuer. 1870.
- Schulgesetzgebung und Methodik der Alten Israeliten. Vienna: W. Branmüller. 1872.
- Die Biblisch-Talmudische Glaubenslehre. Vienna: W. Branmüller. 1873. hdl:2027/hvd.ah6dnx.
- Die Moral der Evangelien und des Talmuds. Brünn: B. Epstein. 1877. hdl:2027/hvd.ah42se.
- Yerushalayim ha-Benuya (in Hebrew). Cracow. 1880. Commentary on the Mishnah, treatise Mo'ed.
- Tor Esier. 1883. Against the blood libel.
