= Morris (given name) =

Morris is a given name in English and other languages. Notable persons with that name include:

== People with the given name ==
- Morris Albert (born 1951), Brazilian singer and songwriter
- Morris Alexander (1877–1946), South African politician
- Morris Almond (born 1985), American professional basketball player
- Morris Ankrum (1896–1964), American radio, television and film actor
- Morris "Morrie" Arnovich (1910–1959), American Major League Baseball All-Star outfielder
- Morris Barry (1918–2000), English radio producer
- Morris Bates (1864–1905), English footballer
- Morris Beckman (architect), American architect
- Morris Beckman (writer) (1921–2015), English writer
- Morris "Moe" Berg (1902–1972), American baseball player and spy
- Morris Bishop (1893–1973), American scholar, historian, biographer, author, and humorist
- Morris Carnovsky (1897–1992), American stage and film actor
- Morris Chestnut (born 1969), American film and television actor
- Morris Chang (born 1931), Taiwanese businessman
- Morris Childs (1902–1991), real name Moishe Chilovsky, American political activist
- Morris Cerullo (1931–2020), American Pentecostal televangelist
- Morris Chapman (born 1940), American church executive
- Morris Claiborne (born 1990), American football player
- Morris Cohen (adventurer) (1887–1970), known as Morris "Two-Gun" Cohen", adventurer
- Morris Cohen (American metallurgist) (1911–2005), American professor of metallurgy
- Morris Cohen (spy) (1910–1995), a.k.a. Peter Kroger, Soviet spy who helped pass Manhattan Project secrets to the USSR
- Morris Raphael Cohen (1880–1947), American Jewish philosopher
- Morris Dalitz, American gangster, businessman, casino owner, and philanthropist
- Moe Davis (born 1958), American Air Force officer and lawyer
- Morris Day (born 1957), American musician, composer and actor
- Morris Dees (born 1936), American trial counsel and former direct mail marketeer for book publishing
- Morus Elfryn (c.1948–2022), pronounced "Morris", Welsh musician and production manager
- Morris Engel (1918–2005), American photographer, cinematographer, and filmmaker
- Morris Ernst (1888–1976), American lawyer and co-founder of the American Civil Liberties Union
- Morris Finer (1917–1974), British lawyer and judge
- Morris Fishbein (1889–1976), American physician and journal editor
- Morris Meyer "Mickey" Fisher (1904/05–1963), American basketball coach
- Morris Fuller Benton (1872–1948), American typeface designer
- Morris E. Gallup (1825–1893), American politician from Ohio
- Morris Ginsberg (1889–1970), Litvak-British sociologist
- Morris Gleitzman (born 1953), English-born Australian writer
- Morris Graves (1910–2001), American expressionist painter
- Morris Halle, (1923–2018), born Morris Pinkowitz, Latvian-American Jewish linguist and professor
- Morris Harvey (1877–1944), British film actor
- Morris Hatalsky (born 1951), American professional golfer
- Morris Hillquit (1869–1933), American lawyer and founding leader of the Socialist Party of America
- Morris Iemma, Australian politician and former Premier of New South Wales
- Morris Janowitz (1919–1988), American sociologist and professor of sociological theory
- Morris Kahn (1930–2026), Israeli entrepreneur
- Morris Kantor (1896–1974), Russian-born American painter
- Morris Kight (1919–2003), American gay rights pioneer and peace activist
- Morris Kirksey (1895–1981), American track and field athlete and rugby union footballer
- Morris Kleiner (born 1948), American economist
- Morris Kline (1908–1992), American professor of mathematics, writer on the history, philosophy, and teaching of mathematics
- Morris Lapidus (1902–2001), American architect
- Morris Levy (1927–1990), American music industry executive
- Morris Lichtenstein (1889–1938), scholar, founder of the Society of Jewish Science
- Morris Louis (1912–1962) born Morris Louis Bernstein, American painter
- Morris Lukowich (born 1956), Canadian professional ice hockey player
- Morris Maddocks (1928–2008), bishop in the Church of England
- Morris McGregor (1923–2003), Canadian politician
- Morris Michtom (1870–1938), Russian Jewish immigrant
- Morris H. Morgan (1859–1910), American classical scholar
- Morris Mott (born 1946), Canadian professional ice hockey player
- Morris Edward Opler (1907–1996), American anthropologist and advocate of Japanese-American civil rights
- Morris Ouma (born 1982), Kenyan cricketer
- Morris Panych (born 1952), Canadian playwright, director and actor
- Morris Pert (1947–2010), Scottish composer, drummer/percussionist and pianist
- Morris Perry (1925–2021), English television actor
- Morris Peterson (born 1977), American professional basketball player
- Morris Possoni (born 1984), Italian professional road bicycle racer
- Morris "Tubby" Raskin (1902–1981), American basketball player and coach
- Morris Robinson (born 1969), American operatic bass
- Morris Rosenfeld (1862–1923), real name Moshe Jacob Alter, American Yiddish poet originating from Eastern Europe
- Morris "Moe" Savransky (1929–2022), American Major League Baseball pitcher
- Morris Schinasi (1855–1928), American tobacco industrialist of Ottoman origin
- Morris Schuring (born 2005), Dutch racing driver
- Morris Sheppard (1875–1941), American politician serving as Congressman and Senator
- Morris Stoloff (1898–1980), American composer
- Morris Henry Sugarman (1889–1946), Russian Empire-born American architect
- Morris Swadesh (1909–1967), American linguist, concentrating on historical linguistics in indigenous languages of the Americas
- Morris Travers (1872–1961), English chemist
- Morris Weiss (1915–2014), American comic book and comic strip artist and writer
- Morris West (1916–1999), Australian novelist and playwright
- Morris Wilkins (1925–2015), inventor of the heart-shaped bathtub and champagne glass bathtub
- Morris Williams (writer) (1809–1874), aka Nicander, Welsh clergyman and writer
- Morris Wijesinghe (1941–2020), Sri Lankan Sinhala musician
- Morris Winchevsky aka Ben Netz (1856–1932), Jewish socialist leader in London and the United States in the late 19th century

== Fictional characters ==
- Morris Bench aka Hydro-Man, Marvel Comics supervillain
- Morris Fletcher, a character from the Carterverse, that appeared in The X-Files as well The Lone Gunmen, portrayed by Michael McKean
- Morris O'Brian, character from the TV series 24 portrayed by actor Carlo Rota
- Morris the Cat, advertising mascot for 9Lives brand cat food, voiced by John Erwin

== See also ==
- Morris (disambiguation)
- Morris (surname), a family name (and a list of people with the name)
- Maurice (given name)
