= Maurício =

Maurício is the Portuguese variant of Mauricio.

Sportspeople with the name include:

- Maurício (footballer, born 2001), Paraguayan footballer
- Maurício Assoline, Braziian footballer
- Maurício Cardoso da Silva, Brazilian footballer
- Maurício Copertino, Brazilian footballer
- Maurício Fernandes, Brazilian footballer
- Maurício José da Silveira Júnior, Brazilian footballer
- Maurício Lima, Brazilian volleyball player
- Maurício de Oliveira Anastácio, Brazilian footballer
- Maurício dos Santos Nascimento, Brazilian footballer
- Maurício Ramos, Brazilian footballer
