= Maurits Allessie =

Dutch academic

Maurits Allessie (born 1945) is an emeritus professor of physiology at Maastricht University. As an electrophysiologist he developed better insights in atrial fibrillation.

== Career ==
Allessie was born in 1945 in Gemert, the Netherlands, and was raised in Amsterdam. He obtained his MD from the University of Amsterdam in 1974, and his PhD from Maastricht University in 1977. At age 38 he became a professor of physiology at the latter university, and seven years later he became head of the department. During his career Allessie studied heart problems.

In 1998 he received the Distinguished Scientist Award of the Heart Rhythm Society, and in 2011 the Founders Lectureship Award.

Allessie became member of the Royal Netherlands Academy of Arts and Sciences (KNAW) in 1989. The academy praised Allessie for developing better insights into atrial fibrillation and electrophysiology of the heart. He was an academic professor at KNAW between 2003 and 2008. Allessie has stressed the importance of classical/integral physiology in research and education.
