= Maurice Evans (footballer, born 1859) =

Welsh footballer

Personal information
- Date of birth: 1859
- Place of birth: Wales
- Position: Defender

Senior career*
Years	Team	Apps	(Gls)
- Oswestry Town

International career
1884	Wales	1	(0)
- * Club domestic league appearances and goals

Maurice Evans (born 1859) was a Welsh international footballer. He was part of the Wales national football team, playing 1 match on 17 March 1884 against England. At club level, he played for Oswestry Town.

== See also ==
- List of Wales international footballers (alphabetical)
