= Walter Crail =

American photojournalist

Walter Haskins Crail (December 18, 1885 – March 5, 1924) was the staff photographer for the Philadelphia Public Ledger during the 1910s and early 1920s.

Born in Ohio, he moved eastward to Atlantic City, New Jersey, and was mentored there by news photographer Harper B. Smith. He later moved to Philadelphia.

Crail became well known for taking photographs under difficult or dangerous conditions, such as climbing to precarious places to get the best angles for photos.

In the 1910s, the Ledger acquired an airplane to allow Crail to take aerial pictures of notable events. The plane was painted with the words "THE LEDGERS" in large capital letters.

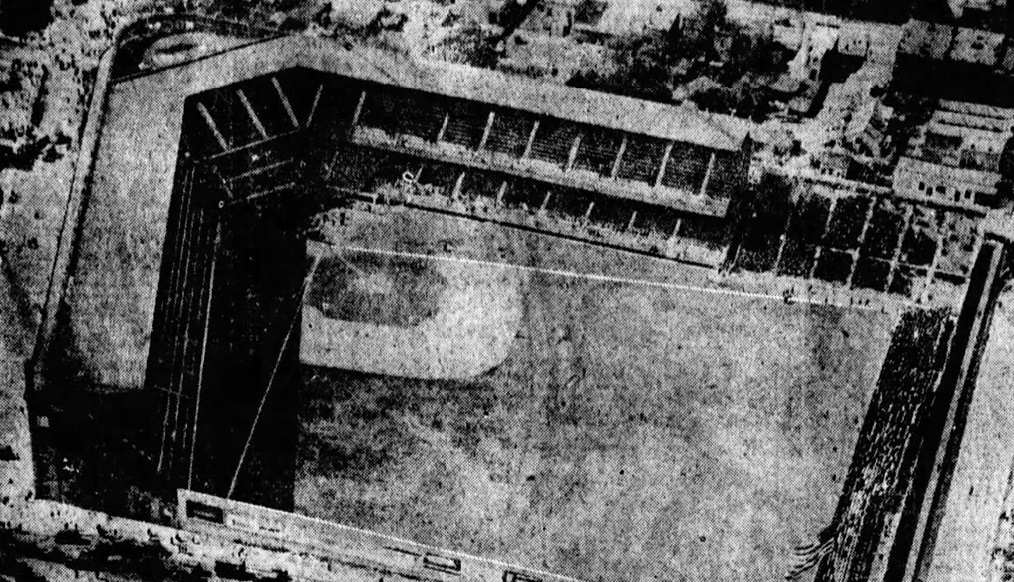

The Ledger plane was sent on assignment to cover the first game of the 1920 World Series, at Ebbets Field in Brooklyn, New York. In the writeup accompanying the pictures, the pilot (US Army Captain Wallace Stryker) commented on his efforts both to locate the ballpark and to survey the area for possible emergency landing sites if that were to become necessary.[Evening Public Ledger, October 6, 1920, p. 14]

Crail's defiance of risky situations caught up to him and resulted in his untimely death. Former President Woodrow Wilson had died on February 3, 1924. Crail attended the funeral in Washington, DC, on February 6. He developed pneumonia, and died on March 5, at the age of 38.[Atlantic City Press, March 7, 1924, p. 11]
