= Maurits van den Boogert =

Dutch real-estate developer and kidnapping victim

Maurits Hubrecht van den Boogert (born 1972) is a Dutch writer on Ottoman history from about 1700–1900. He studied Orientalism at Leiden University, obtaining his PhD in 2001, and was a researcher in Ottoman history at that institute.

== Bibliography ==
- Aleppo Observed: Ottoman Syria Through the Eyes of Two Scottish Doctors, Alexander and Patrick Russell, 2010

The book reviews the text The Natural History of Aleppo. It then critiques the scientific information contained in that book, reviews the biographies of the authors, gives context of the era in which the book was written, and examines the European perspectives of the authors and the era on Syrian culture, religion, and society.

- Friends and rivals in the east. Studies in Anglo-Dutch relations in the Levant from the seventeenth to the early nineteenth century, 2000

The book was reviewed in the Low Countries Historical Review.
