= Maurice de Bus =

French sculptor

Maurice Désiré de Bus
- Born: 30 December 1907; Mitry-Mory, Seine-et-Marne, France
- Died: 11 November 1963 (aged 55); Paris, France
- Education: École nationale supérieure des Beaux-Arts
- Occupation: Sculptor

Maurice de Bus (30 December 1907 - 11 November 1963) was a French sculptor. He graduated from the École nationale supérieure des Beaux-Arts. He won the Prix de Rome in Sculpture in 1937. He lived at the Villa Medici in 1938–1939. He also designed coins for the Monnaie de Paris.

== Biography ==
A student of Paul Niclausse at the School of Decorative Arts, and later of Henri Bouchard at the School of Fine Arts, he won the Chenavard Prize in 1932 and the Prix de Rome in 1937. He was a professor at the École des Arts Appliqués, located at 11 Rue Dupetit-Thouars in Paris. He produced medals for the Monnaie de Paris.

Starting in 1950, he taught drawing and sculpture at the École des Arts Appliqués in Paris. The painter Robert Perlin joined his studio in 1958.

The Bossuet Museum in Meaux is dedicating an exhibition to him from October 15, 2022, to January 29, 2023.
