= Mollie McNutt =

Australian poet

Mollie McNutt (23 March 1885 – 26 February 1919) was an Australian poet whose work appeared in many newspapers and who published one book.

== Early life ==
Mollie was born Mary E. Shaw, to parents John A. and Margaret Shaw in 1885 in West Maitland, New South Wales. In 1901 Mary became a pupil teacher at Hillgrove Public School, N.S.W. and shortly afterwards was appointed teacher at West Armidale Infants Public School. In 1911, she resigned from teaching to marry Andrew McNutt, who was teaching in Uralla, and who had also been a teacher at Hillgrove. Shortly after marriage they moved to Bismuth so Andrew could take up the position of teacher, and within two years he was transferred to Torrington.

== Career and works ==
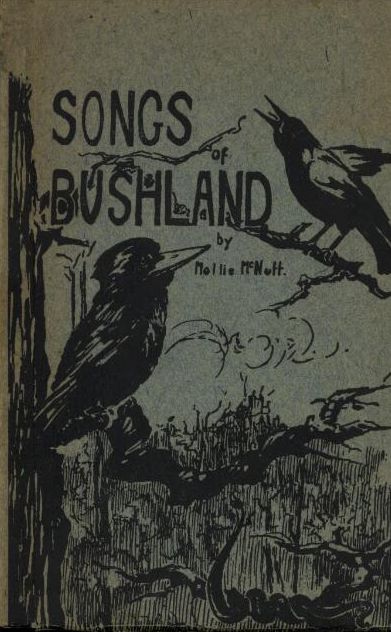
Cover – Songs of Bushland

McNutt's writings won prizes or mentions in several competitions, including the Gould League of Bird Lovers (1912) and 1913, Bathurst Centenary Literary Competition, and The Sydney Mail's Australian Remounts competition. McNutt's poetry which appeared in newspapers included "The Quarrel", poetry about nature, including "A Bush Home" and "The Birds I Love", and war poems "Australian Remounts" and "The Boys Who Blazed The Track". Some of Mary's poems were set to music, including "A Nook Of Bushland" (1922), "Buttercups", "The Birds I Love" (1925), and "Silver Wattle" (1930). McNutt's works were used by the Department of Education and McNutt was named by children and educators among lists of prominent and favourite Australian writers. A list of at least 16 works can be found on AustLit and over 80 works are included in a biography, Australia Song-bird: Mollie McNutt, Poetry And Prose.

The book Songs Of Bushland was published in 1918 by Winn & Co. publishers and sold out before it made it to book shops. AustLit states Songs Of Bushland is "primarily not a children's book".

== Death and legacy ==
McNutt died of tuberculosis on 26 February 1919, aged 33. An unfortunate incident happened as the body was conveyed to be put on the train to Armidale for interment, when the wheel came off the horse-drawn hearse. At the graveside, Brother Stephens, on behalf of the Manchester Unity Independent Order of Oddfellows Lodge said of McNutt: "as the seasons come and go may wattle-time ever serve as a reminder of our Australian song-bird".

The Inspector of Schools proposed a memorial to Mollie, and a cot with an inscription was bought for the Royal Alexandra Hospital for Children with over 800 pounds raised by donations from "Practically every public school in the state".

Another book published about McNutt is The Road To Torrington: Remembering Mollie McNutt, and in it the author says McNutt was remembered in a school song in Torrington in the 1960s, and a trophy called the Mollie McNutt Memorial Shield.
