= Geza von Hoffmann =

Austrian-Hungarian eugenicist and writer (1885–1921)

Geza von Hoffmann (1885 – 1921) was a prominent Austrian-Hungarian eugenicist and writer. He lived for a time in California as the Austrian Vice-Consulate where he observed and wrote on eugenics practices in the United States.

His best known book, Die Rassenhygiene in den Vereinigten Staaten von Nordamerika (Racial Hygiene in the United States of America) described his observations in America.

His reports on American eugenicist activity influenced German and especially Berlin eugenicists up to the first World War. He served as a key connection between American and German eugenics activities.

== Views on eugenics ==
He shared his views with Germans and Hungarians “that eugenic policies should improve the racial qualities of the nation”. He was predominantly concerned with improving the biological quality of the population.

Published in 1913, Racial Hygiene in the United States in America discussed the similarities of eugenics theories such as negative and positive eugenics and so-called practical social policies like sterilization and immigration. He endorsed “negative” eugenic policies on the practical level, while simultaneously emphasizing their theoretical value. Negative eugenics programs included any activities that discourage or stop the reproduction or continuation of certain peoples deemed inferior. It could also include programs that simply limit certain people to the state. These programs would include sterilization, immigration bans, separate institutions for different groups, marriage restrictions and more. The people typically picked for negative eugenics were placed in racialized groups or somehow physically or mentally deemed "unfit". Positive eugenics entailed any programs that encourage reproduction, success or admittance into the state of certain groups considered superior. These programs could include restricting abortions, providing financial aid for additional children and more. According to his book, he viewed marriage limits, immigration laws, and forced sterilization as the best ways to practice eugenics as he observed it in the United States. They were all negative, which was the main criticism about both his work and United States' practice of eugenics.

His book Krieg und Rassenhygiene (War and Racial Hygiene) published in 1916 demonstrated his view of war as ultimately destructive to the "hereditary strength among European nations." According to Hoffman, the best young men, representing the strength of the European nations at war, either died or were injured in other lands which hurt the genetic strength of the population. This observation came after the outbreak of World War I, which resulted in catastrophic loss of life.

== Austro-Hungarian influence ==
Geza von Hoffmann dominated the external group of eugenics in Eastern Europe. He and other members of the external group looked outside of Eastern Europe for influence on eugenics instead of relying on their own nations. His work, along with the work of other notable eugenicists in the Eugenic Society in Hungary, made that country between 1910 and 1918 the “vanguard of eugenic thinking in Europe." He compared and combined eugenics ideas in both Germany and United States and theorized about applying the combined concepts to Hungary society.

In his article titled "Eugenics in the Central Empires since 1914", he compared various eugenics societies and their different activities. He compared the German Society for Racial Hygiene, the German Society for Racial Hygiene in Munich, the International Society for Racial Hygiene, the Austrian Society for the Study of the Science of Population, the Czech Society for Eugenics, the Hungarian Society for Racial Hygiene and Population Policy.

Hoffmann further developed the concept of eugenics in Austria-Hungary and later internationally. He believed other eugenicists like István Apáthy and Madzsar were too focused on the "social and political" aspects of eugenics. He believed eugenics study needed to look at and understand the biological aspect of the practice. He argued that the "biological perspective" was the most important aspect of understanding eugenics and racial hygiene.

== German connections ==
Hoffman was among a group of Central and Southeast European eugenicists educated in Germany and Austria. Despite being an Austro-Hungarian diplomat he "had strong connections with German racial hygiene."

Before the 1920s, Hofmann was the strongest connection between German and American eugenicists. World War I made it more difficult to keep up that contact. However, despite the loss in contact, he continued to influence German eugenic practices significantly with his observations on American eugenic practices.

== American observations ==
Hoffmann was a rare European observer of eugenics in the early 1900s, and he offered a comprehensive research of eugenic legislation in United States. He lived for several years in California as the Austrian vice-consulate. He kept his German colleagues, especially his Berlin colleagues, and even the German public, informed about the development of racial eugenics in United States.

In 1913, his book Die Rassenhygiene in den Vereinigten Staaten von Nordamerika (Racial Hygiene in the United States of America) was used as a standard work of the early American eugenics movement. It outlined the scientific basis of eugenics. He explained the widespread acceptance of eugenic principles in United States. He argued that the ideas of Galton, Mendel and Darwin, “theories of evolution and decay, importance of heredity, and the possibility of race improvement” were becoming a part of American science and social life. He described how even the American Presidents supported some forms of eugenics. He quoted Woodrow Wilson's presidential address where President Wilson acknowledges “that the whole nation has awakened to and recognizes the extraordinary importance of the science of human heredity, as well as its application to the ennoblement of the human family." He quoted another President, Theodore Roosevelt, who used Edward A. Ross's phrase “race suicide" as his own. Perhaps most importantly to German eugenicists, he described how American federal and state agencies were lending structure and financial support to eugenic research. He outlined American marriage restrictions of “feebleminded” persons and he included information on the thirty-two states that forbid marriage and sexual relations between blacks and whites. He discussed the first eugenic sterilization performed in the United States in Indiana in 1899. According to Hoffmann, it was performed with no legal basis. In 1907 the doctor in charge of the procedure asked the Indiana legislature to create laws permitting sterilization of mentally handicapped persons. He documented the many states that followed suit in passing sterilization laws.

- 1909 California and Connecticut
- 1911 Nevada, Iowa, and New Jersey
- 1912 New York
- 1913 Kansas, Michigan, North Dakota, Oregon

In his final chapter of the book, Hoffman addressed the fact that American eugenics is based on the concept of Charles Woodruff (American Eugenicist) that northwest Europeans are “our best citizens."

In 1910, he reported in the Journal of the International Society for Racial Hygiene, (Archiv für Rassen- und Gesellschaft) on a proposal by the American Genetic Association led by Harry H. Laughlin which stated that the “lowest 10 percent of American population be sterilized”.

However, he became less in favor of United States eugenic goals over time. He claimed that “rash actions, the lack of a powerful bureaucratic system, and the peculiarity of the American Constitution were partially responsible for getting sterilization laws passed, but also contributed to their poor enforcement”.

== Influence in Germany ==
Hoffmann's work helped shape German's view of the United States. It revealed the importance of eugenics in United States to German eugenicists. German eugenicists often referred to his work in addition to the work of Harry Laughlin.

In part because of Hoffmann's work, the United States was considered by German eugenicists to be the "first country to enforce comprehensive eugenics legislation." German eugenicists also believed that racial conflicts in the United States were what pushed such a systemized eugenics movement. In addition, because of Hoffmann's work, the United States was also looked down upon by German eugenicists for "lack of enforcement."

Hoffmann's assumed a pivotal historical significance for the eugenics movement in Germany. His connection reveals the importance of American eugenics to Germans before World War I and shows how American and German histories are connected.

== Recognition ==
=== General ===
Hoffmann was acknowledged as an expert in Germany and America on eugenics. He “contributed to European and American debates on racial hygiene, eugenics and sterilization.” His books and articles were published in both Hungary and abroad. He first propagated his eugenics views in Hungary and then to the broader audience in the rest of Europe and North America.

=== Germany ===
Hoffmann was praised for providing insight into eugenicist activities, structures, and attitudes in the United States. He was however, criticized by Fritz Lenz who argued that Americans had a better negative eugenics operation but not enough positive eugenics. Lenz believed American leaders were not pushing American women to have enough children. Lenz said it was a problem of “extreme dominance of the ladies." Essentially, according to Lenz, American was doing enough to stop inferior reproduction but needed to encourage superior reproduction. Lenz also believed that women in America had too much choice about reproduction.

=== United States ===
Hoffmann's work was respected in the United States in some circles as evidenced by the review of his book in the Bulletin of the American Academy of Medicine. His book Die Rassenhygiene in den Vereinigten Staaten von Nordamerika (Racial Hygiene in United States) first published in 1913 was reviewed in the 14th Volume in 1913. The bulletin reported that, while in United States as Vice-Counsel of Austria-Hungary, he gathered significant material for his book. The book, according to the bulletin, is a good examination of the United States eugenics activities from chapter one's foundation of eugenics, chapter two's spread of eugenics in the America, chapter three's "marriage regulations with eugenics purpose", chapter four's sterilization of the degenerate and chapter five's selection of the immigrant. The bulletin especially gave credit to the appendix that included marriage laws, sterilization laws, immigration laws, an "admirable bibliography comprising 927 numbers," and index of authors. According to the bulletin, there was "no other work which gives a more complete or concise statement of the progress of eugenics in the United States and every student of the subject should have access to the volume."

== Works ==
- Die Rassenhygiene in den Vereinigten Staaten von Nordamerika (Racial Hygiene in the United States of America) 1913
- “Eugenics in the Central Empires since 1914”
- “Eugenic and Works of a General Character” with other authors
- “Genealogy”
- “Immigration and Emigration as Related to Racial Changes”
- Krieg und Rassenhygiene (War and Racial Hygiene) 1916
- “Negative Eugenics, Sterilization, Segregation, etc.”
