= Hugh Maurice =

Welsh manuscript transcriber

Hugh Maurice (1775 – 18 March 1825) was a transcriber of Welsh manuscripts.

== Personal life ==
Hugh Maurice was born in Llanfihangel Glyn Myfyr to Peter Maurice and Jane Maurice, sister of Owen Jones, and was christened on 5 June.

Maurice married Elizabeth Mary Louisa in 1800 at St Olave's Church, Southwark, London. The wedding took place on the day of the Gwyneddigion Society's annual dinner; Maurice was the vice-president of the society at the time and the president and recorder (Thomas Roberts and John Jones) attended the wedding. The marriage took place unbeknownst to Elizabeth's father, Rowland Jones, a former president of the Gwyneddigion Society.

Hugh and Elizabeth Maurice had two sons and a daughter. His first-born son, Rowland, was also a translator and translated Nennius on 4 July 1817. Peter Maurice, born 29 June 1803, attended Jesus College, Oxford and became a priest on 13 Oct 1827. He worked as chaplain for New College (1828–58), All Souls (1837–58) and was vicar of Yarnton (1858–78). He also wrote hymns and church music, and pamphlets condemning Popery. Maurice's daughter, Jane Maurice, (born 19 October 1812) wrote twenty hymns that can be found in the 1861 Choral Hymn Book.

Maurice lived in many places over the course of his life, starting in Llanfihangel Glyn Myfyr before moving to Upper Thames Street, Tooley Street, Greenwich, Pengwern, Tremadoc and Plâs Gwyn in Llanrug until his death in 1825. He is buried at Llanfihangel Glyn Myfyr.

== Career ==
Maurice worked as a skinner in London with his uncle, and the two shared their literary interests. With Owen Jones as a teacher, Maurice learnt to transcribe Welsh manuscripts in prose and verse, becoming a principal member of the Gwyneddigion Society. He set up his own skinning business in Tooley street, transcribing as a hobby. His early transcripts include illustrations and calligraphy. A number of transcripts attributed to Maurice are in the Cymmrodorion collection and the "Bardoniaeth" Manuscripts in the British Library.

Maurice's contribution to The Myvyrian Archaiology of Wales (1801–1807) is acknowledged in the preface.
