= Mauritius (given name) =

Mauritius is a masculine given name. Bearers include:

- Saint Maurice or Mauritius (died c. 287), Egyptian leader of the Theban Legion martyred along with his entire unit for refusing to attack fellow Christians
- Mauritius II of Trier (fl. c. 398–407 or after 419), Bishop of Trier
- Mauritius Ferber (1471–1537), Roman Catholic Prince-Bishop of Warmia
- Mauritius Lowe (1746–1793), British painter and engraver
- Mauritius Ngupita (born 2000), Namibian cricketer
- Mauritius Vogt, monastic name of Johann Georg Vogt (1669–1730), German geographer, cartographer, musician, historian and member of the Cistercian Order
- Mauritius Wilde (born 1965), German Benedictine monk, priest, professor, podcaster, spiritual director and author

== See also ==
- Maurice (name)
