= Moriz Ludassy =

Hungarian journalist

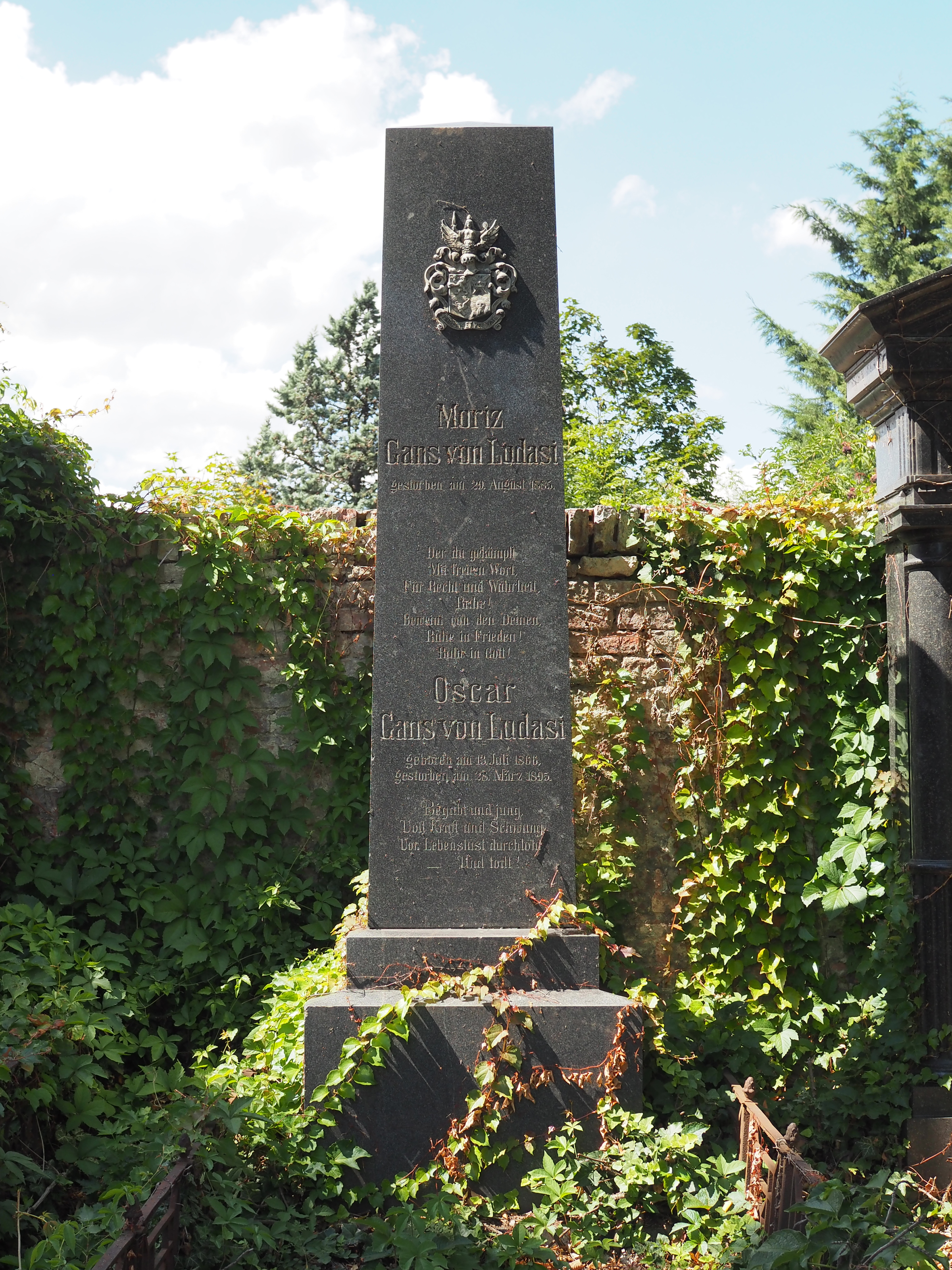
Grave in Vienna

Moriz Ludassy, aka M. Gans von Lúdassy (1825 – August 29, 1885) was a Hungarian journalist.

Ludassy was born at Komorn. As early as 1848 he was editor of the "Esti Lapok" in Budapest and of the "Magyar Világ", advocating in both periodicals the cause of the Conservatives. About 50 years later he went to Vienna, where, with Georg Apponyi and Paul Sennyei, he founded the "Debatte", which advocated the establishment of a dual government in Austro-Hungary and the political equality of the 2 countries. When Count Julius Andrássy was premier, Ludassy was chief of the Hungarian press bureau and was at the same time ministerial councilor in the department of the interior. He returned to Vienna, however, where he was commissioned by Minister Beust to edit the "Tagespresse", the organ of the imperial court party during the war of 1870–71. In recognition of his services he was created a Hungarian noble. He died at Reichenau an der Rax.

One of his sons, Julius Ludassy (1858–1922), whose pen-name is "Julius Goose," was one of the editors of the "Fremdenblatt" in Vienna. He wrote several comedies, among them "Maximen," "Spleen," and "Garrick."
