= Moritz =

Moritz may refer to:

- Moritz (name), a given name and surname
- Moritz, Germany, a village and a former municipality
- Moritz (beer), a Spanish beer brand

== See also ==
- St. Moritz (disambiguation)
- Moriz, a given name and surname
- Moric, a given name and surname
