= Morris =

Morris may refer to:

== Places ==
=== Canada ===
- Morris Township, Ontario, now part of the municipality of Morris-Turnberry
- Rural Municipality of Morris, Manitoba
  - Morris, Manitoba, a town mostly surrounded by the municipality
- Morris (electoral district), Manitoba (defunct)
- Rural Municipality of Morris No. 312, Saskatchewan

=== United States ===
==== Communities ====
- Morris, Alabama, a town
- Morris, Connecticut, a town
- Morris, Georgia, an unincorporated community
- Morris, Illinois, a city
- Morris, Indiana, an unincorporated community
- Morris, Minnesota, a city
- Morristown, New Jersey, a town
- Morris (town), New York
  - Morris (village), New York
- Morris, Oklahoma, a city
- Morris, Pennsylvania, an unincorporated community
- Morris, West Virginia, an unincorporated community
- Morris, Kanawha County, West Virginia, a ghost town
- Morris, Wisconsin, a town
- Morris Township (disambiguation)

==== Other places in the United States ====
- Morris County, Kansas
- Morris County, New Jersey
- Morris County, Texas
- Morris Creek (South Dakota)
- Morris Island, Charleston Harbor, South Carolina
- Morris Plains, New Jersey
- Morris Reservoir, California
- Mount Morris (disambiguation)

== Ships ==
- USS Morris, various ships
- USCS Morris, a survey ship with the United States Coast Survey in service from 1849 to 1855
- USS AFDM-2, later renamed Mr. Morris, an auxiliary floating drydock in World War II (as USS YFD-4)

== Companies ==
- Morris & Co., a company manufacturing items of decorative art
- Morris & Company, an early 20th century meatpacking company
- Morris Air, a former low-fare airline, now part of Southwest Airlines
- Morris Communications, an American publishing company
- Morris Motors, a former British car manufacturer
- Morris Multimedia, an American publishing company

== People and fictional characters ==
- Morris (given name), including a list of people and fictional characters with the name
- Morris (surname), including a list of people and fictional characters with the name
- Lord Morris (disambiguation), various people and titles
- Morris, one of the 14 merchant families known as the Tribes of Galway, Ireland
- Morris family (disambiguation)
- Morris (cartoonist), pseudonym for the Belgian cartoonist Maurice De Bevere (1923–2001)
- Morris (singer), stage name of Romanian singer Marius Iancu (born 1976)
- Mixmaster Morris, stage name of English ambient DJ and underground musician Morris Gould (born 1965)

== Other uses ==
- Morris Canal, a defunct canal which once transported coal across northern New Jersey
- Morris station, a former railway station in Morris, Illinois
- Morris the Cat, mascot of the "9Lives" brand cat food
- The title character of Morris the Midget Moose, a Walt Disney animated short
- Morris Chair, an early type of reclining chair
- Morris College, a private liberal arts college in Sumter, South Carolina
- Morris High School (disambiguation)
- Morris Museum (disambiguation)
- Morris Performing Arts Center, South Bend, Indiana, on the National Register of Historic Places
- Morris Bridge, over the Illinois River at Morris, Illinois
- Morris dance, a traditional English dance form
- Morris worm, one of the first computer worms distributed via the Internet

== See also ==
- St Morris, South Australia, Australia, a suburb of Adelaide
- Maurice (disambiguation)
- Moris (disambiguation)
- Morrice
- Morriston
- Morristown (disambiguation)
- Morrisville (disambiguation)
