= Duncan G. Stroik =

American architect (born 1962)

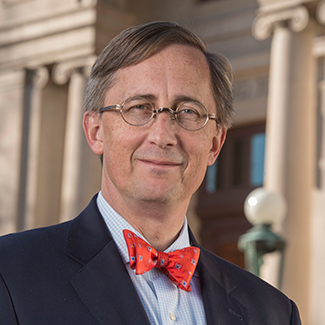
- Stroik in 2019

Commissioner of the U.S. Commission of Fine Arts
- In office December 17, 2019 - December 2023

Personal details
- Born: Duncan Gregory Stroik; January 14, 1962 (age 64)
- Education: University of Virginia; Yale University
- Occupation: Architect; professor

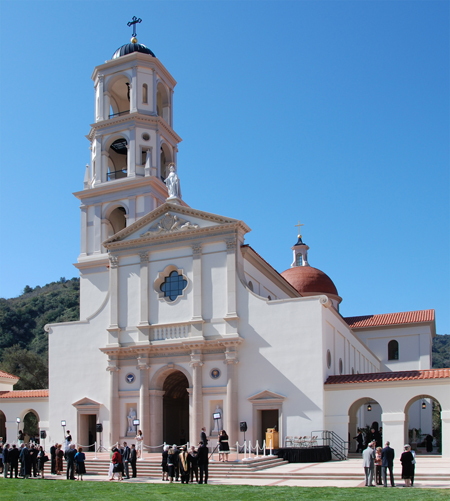
Our Lady of the Most Holy Trinity Chapel, Thomas Aquinas College

Duncan Gregory Stroik (born January 14, 1962) is an American architect, a professor of architecture at the University of Notre Dame School of Architecture, and founding editor of the Sacred Architecture Journal. His work continues the tradition of classical and Palladian architecture, also known as New Classical Architecture.

Stroik is considered a leading figure in traditional Roman Catholic sacred architecture. In his academic work, Stroik has stressed the importance of tradition, and advocates for beauty as the principal standard of architecture. In 2016 Stroik received the Arthur Ross Award for recognition of excellence in the classical tradition.

== Early life and career ==
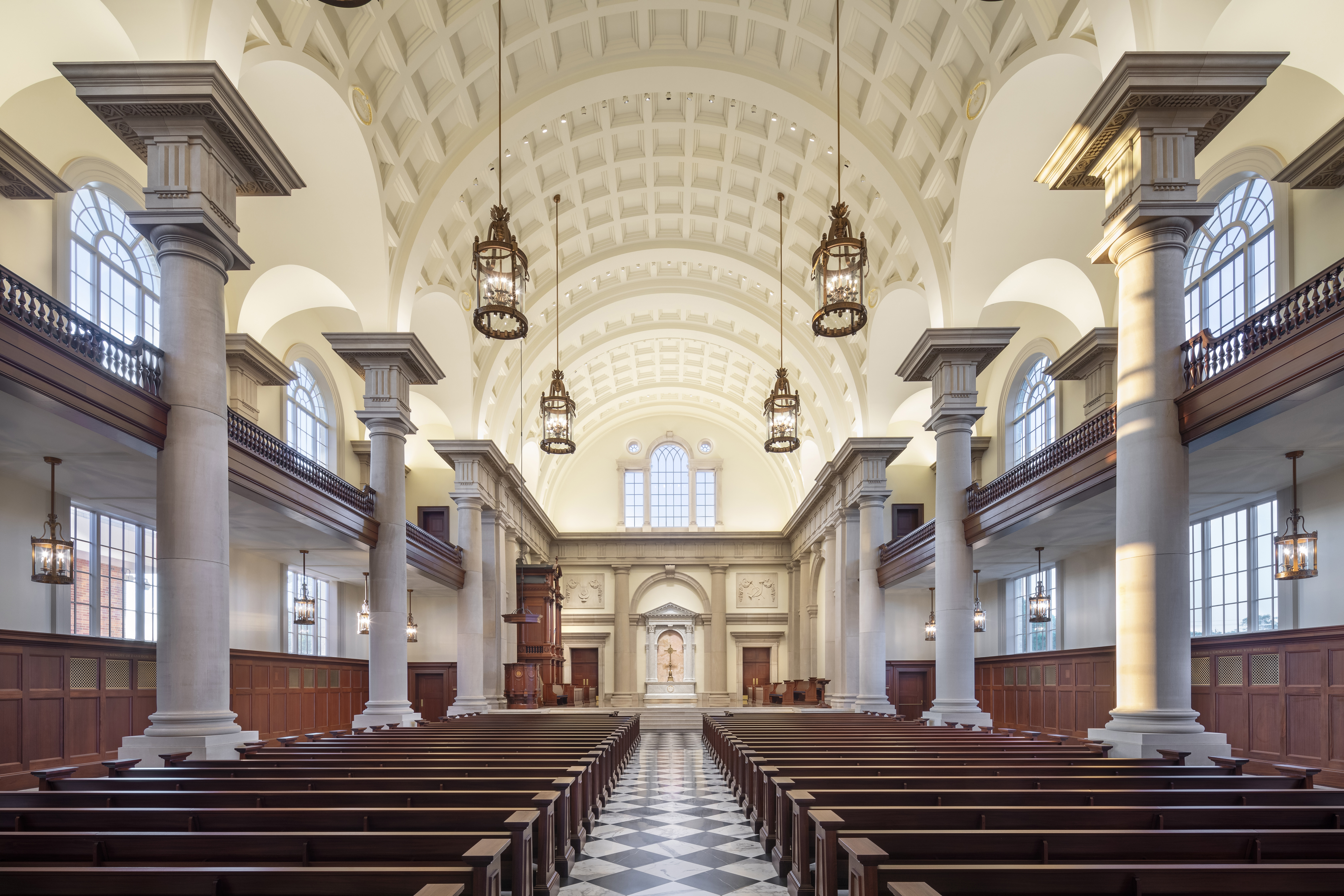
Christ Chapel, Hillsdale College

Stroik received a bachelor's degree from the University of Virginia School of Architecture in 1984 and a master's degree in architecture from Yale School of Architecture in 1987. After graduating from Yale, Stroik worked as a designer for Allan Greenberg. In 1990, Stroik joined the Notre Dame School of Architecture as a founding faculty member of the school's classical program. In that same year, he founded his firm, Duncan G. Stroik Architect LLC.

Stroik attributes his interest in classical architecture to Thomas Gordon Smith, a forefront postmodern architect to embrace canonical classicism.

== Institute for Sacred Architecture and The Sacred Architecture Journal ==
In 1998, Stroik founded the Institute for Sacred Architecture, a non-profit organization dedicated to a renewal of beauty in contemporary church design. The institute’s principal activity is the twice yearly publication of the Sacred Architecture Journal, which is dedicated to an ongoing discussion of current issues in the field of sacred architecture.

== Major projects ==
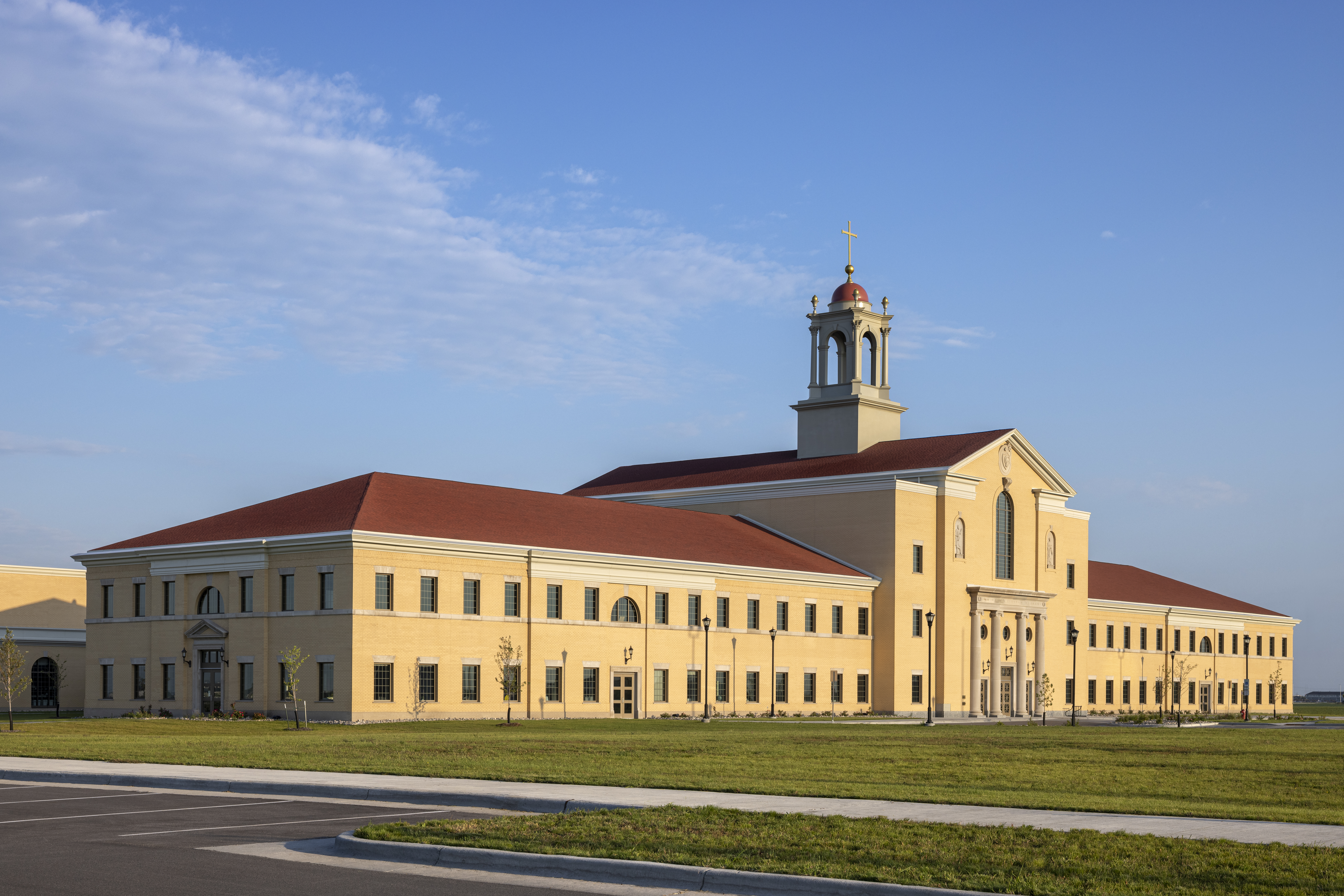
Capstone Classical Academy, Fargo, North Dakota

=== St. Augustine Cathedral ===
In 2020, a renovation of St. Augustine Cathedral in Kalamazoo, Michigan, originally designed by Ralph Adams Cram in 1951, was completed. The interior modifications intended to elevate the architectural style of the church, which had been designated a cathedral in 1971 with the formation of the Diocese of Kalamazoo.

Stroik's classical design reflected elements of the original Gothic style of the cathedral. Renovations included a new marble sanctuary floor, predella, baldacchino, ambo, cathedra, new and restored altars, and an interior decorative paint scheme.

=== Christ Chapel ===
Christ Chapel was dedicated on October 2nd to celebrate Hillsdale College's 175th anniversary. The 27,000-square-foot chapel serves as a non-denominational shared space for both student religious groups and musical performances. The 70-foot tall brick and limestone facade forms a new quadrangle on Hillsdale's campus, and the round portico is supported by eight Doric limestone columns crowned with a 32-foot self-supporting brick dome. Limestone columns in the nave are 28 feet tall and support the building structure.

=== Cathedral of Saint Joseph ===
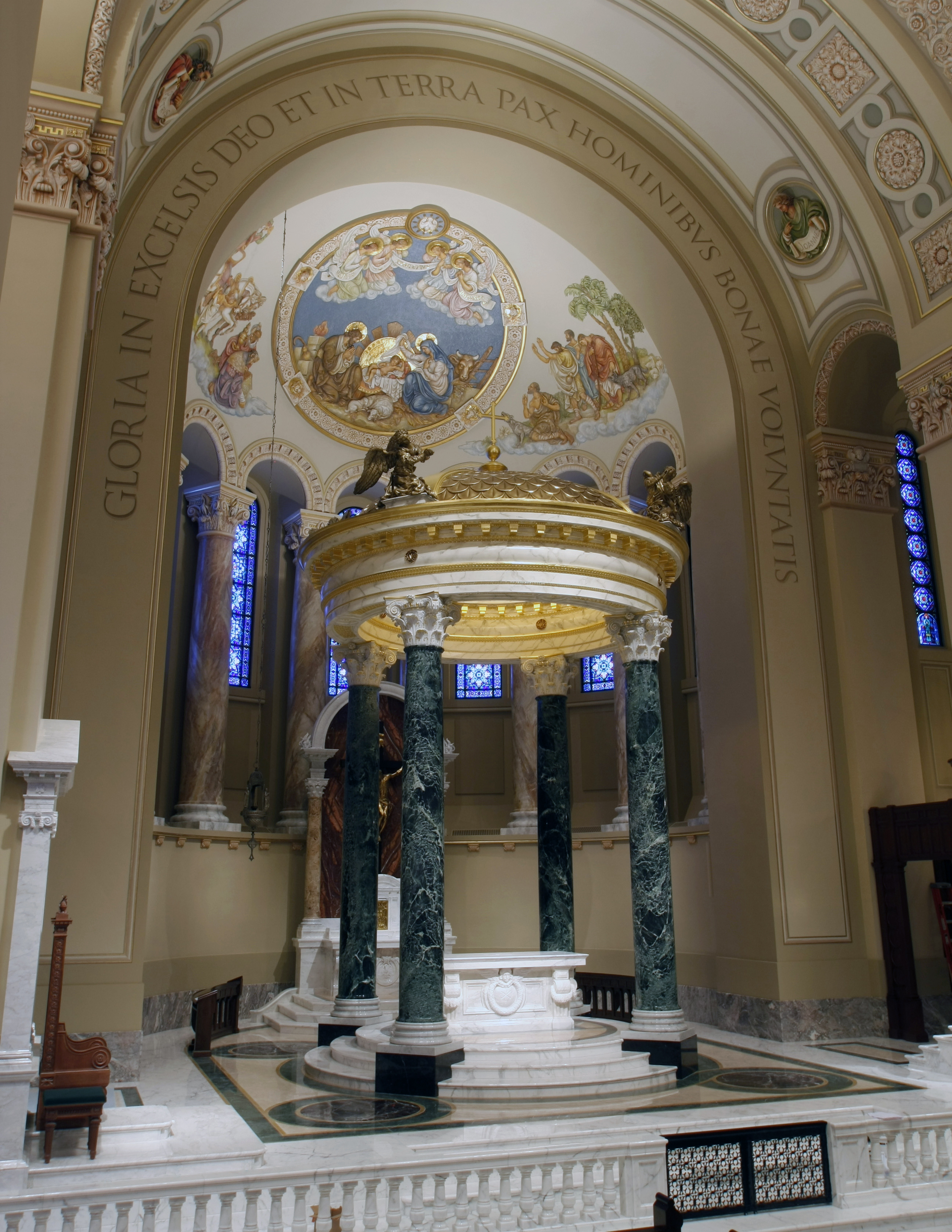
Cathedral of Saint Joseph Sanctuary

In 2011, the St. Joseph Cathedral in Sioux Falls, South Dakota, underwent an interior renovation to restore the design to that originally intended by Bishop Thomas O'Gorman and Emmanuel Louis Masqueray, architect of the Cathedral.

A new, circular baldacchino was built for the main altar featuring four 8,000-lb. marble composite columns. The church's stone tile floor was replaced with a decorative marble flooring, and mechanical, electrical, sound, and lighting systems were replaced, including new custom chandeliers replicated from the Cathedral's original design.

=== Thomas Aquinas College chapel ===
Our Lady of the Most Holy Trinity Chapel at Thomas Aquinas College was dedicated on March 7, 2009. Stroik's design for this 15,000-square-foot (1,400 m^{2}), $23 million chapel references Early Christian, Spanish Mission and Renaissance architecture. The chapel's design is cruciform in shape and features both a 135-foot (41 m) bell tower and an 89-foot (27 m) dome. In 2003 Pope John Paul II blessed the chapel's plans, and in 2008, Pope Benedict XVI blessed its cornerstone.

=== Shrine of Our Lady of Guadalupe ===
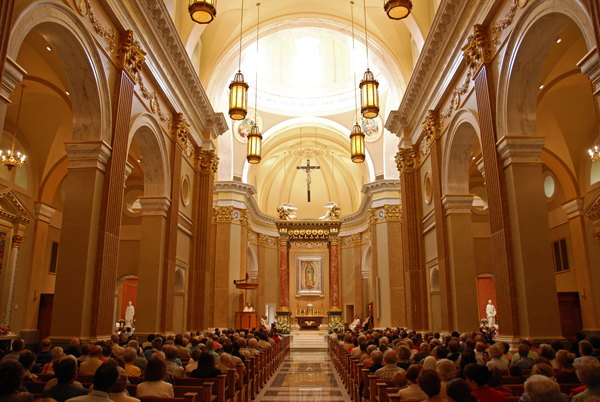
The Shrine of Our Lady of Guadalupe

The Shrine of Our Lady of Guadalupe, in La Crosse, Wisconsin was commissioned by Cardinal Raymond Leo Burke, in order to create a national pilgrimage site in the Diocese of La Crosse. The shrine is situated amidst 70 acres (280,000 m^{2}) of woodland near the south end of La Crosse. On July 31, 2008 the Shrine Church was dedicated, with the dedication Mass presided over by Cardinal Burke, who was joined by Cardinals Justin Rigali of Philadelphia and Francis George of Chicago.

=== Organ case at the Cathedral of Saint Paul ===
Taking inspiration from Emmanuel Louis Masqueray's original design, Stroik designed a new organ case for the Cathedral of Saint Paul in Saint Paul, Minnesota. The new organ case preserved the view of the Cathedral's rose window, and featured 123 new organ ranks. The case was constructed of hand-carved walnut wood with gilded details. Stroik's design featured Saint Cecilia, patron saint of music, atop a central dome beneath the Cathedral's rose window and flanked by two human-sized angels.

Other major projects include:

- Chapel of the Holy Cross on the Jesuit High School campus in Tampa, Florida
- All Saints Church in Walton, Kentucky
- Christ Chapel at Hillsdale College in Hillsdale, Michigan
- St. Margaret Mary Parish in Bullhead City, Arizona
- St. Theresa School and Education Center in Sugar Land, Texas
- St. Catherine of Siena Church in Trumbull, Connecticut
- Villa Indiana in South Bend, Indiana

== Raffaella: A New Fairytale Ballet ==
In 2024, Stroik commissioned and produced a new full-length ballet, Raffaella: A New Fairytale Ballet, in honor of his daughter's passing in 2018. The ballet premiered at the Morris Performing Arts Center in South Bend, Indiana. The piece was choreographed by Claire Kretzschmar, with an original score by Vanderbilt professor Michael Kurek.

Jane Coombs wrote in The Wall Street Journal that:

"Ms. Kretzschmar has choreographed an impeccably paced ballet that builds to a moving conclusion, propelled by Mr. Kurek’s neo-romantic music that synchronizes closely with the pantomime. Raffaella Stroik once explained, “When I am on stage, I just feel this amazing joy and love and I just want the audience to feel that way.” Anyone fortunate enough to have attended “Raffaella” will have felt just that."

== Selected publications ==
- Church Building as a Sacred Place: Beauty, Transcendence, and the Eternal (Chicago: Hillenbrand, 2012).
- Reconquering Sacred Space 2000: The Church in the City of the Third Millennium (2012). Edited by Duncan Stroik, Cristiano Rosponi, and Giampaolo Rossi

== Selected awards ==
- "Palladio Award" for Our Lady of the Most Holy Trinity Chapel (2022) Traditional Building Magazine
- "Addison Mizner Award" for The Chapel of the Holy Cross (2019) Institute of Classical Architecture and Art
- "Clem Labine Award" (2017) Traditional Building Magazine
- "Arthur Ross Award" for Architecture (2016)
- "Palladio Award" for The Cathedral of Saint Paul Organ Case (2014) Traditional Building Magazine
- "Copper in Architecture Award" for the Basilica of the National Shrine of Mary Help of Christians at Holy Hill. (2014) Copper Development Association, Inc.
- "Acanthus Award of Arete" for Restoration and Renovation of The Cathedral of Saint Joseph (2013) Institute of Classical Architecture and Art
- "Palladio Award" for Restoration and Renovation of The Cathedral of Saint Joseph (2013) Traditional Building Magazine
- "Henry Hering Memorial Medal: Art and Architecture Award" for the Shrine of Our Lady of Guadalupe (2012) National Sculpture Society
- "Indiana Design Award" for the Shrine of Our Lady of Guadalupe (2012) American Institute of Architects, Indiana
- "Palladio Award" for New Design & Construction - less than 30,000 sq.ft. for Our Lady of the Most Holy Trinity (2011) Traditional Building Magazine
- "Tucker Design Award" for Our Lady of the Most Holy Trinity Chapel (2010) Building Stone Institute
- "Brick in Architecture Award" for Saint Theresa Education Center (2010) Brick Industry Association
- "Indiana Design Award" for Villa Indiana (1998) American Institute of Architects, Indiana

== Bibliography ==
- Jonathan Liedl. "The Architect Who Fought Modernism — and Inspired a Sacred Architecture Revival." National Catholic Register (May 27, 2025)
- Michael Tamara. "Crisis Magazine." How Lovely (Again) is Thy Dwelling Place (September 2014)
- Martha McDonald. "Sacred Architecture in the New Century." Traditional Building (December 2014): 6-11.
- Nancy A. Ruhling. "Architectural Organ Case." Traditional Building (June 2014). 21-23
- Elizabeth Lev. "Beautiful Homes for Communion with God." Zenit (July 5, 2013).
- Jennifer Adams. "Cathedral undergoes a 'creative restoration'." Stone World Magazine (May 2013): 70-79.
- Martha McDonald. "Creative Restoration." Traditional Building (December 2012): 28-31.
- Joseph Pronechen. "Altar Rails Returns to Use." National Catholic Register (July 2011): B4.
- Lynne Lavelle. "Sacred Mission." Traditional Building (June 2011): 20-23.
- Alexis Fisher. "Chapel Design Reflects College Mission." Stone World Magazine (July 2010): 116-128.
- Catesby Leigh. "A Return to Grace." Wall Street Journal (March 18, 2010): D7.
- Bradford McKee. "Our Lady of the Most Holy Trinity." Architect (December 2009): 69-76.
