= Raffaella (ballet) =

Raffaella: A New Fairytale Ballet
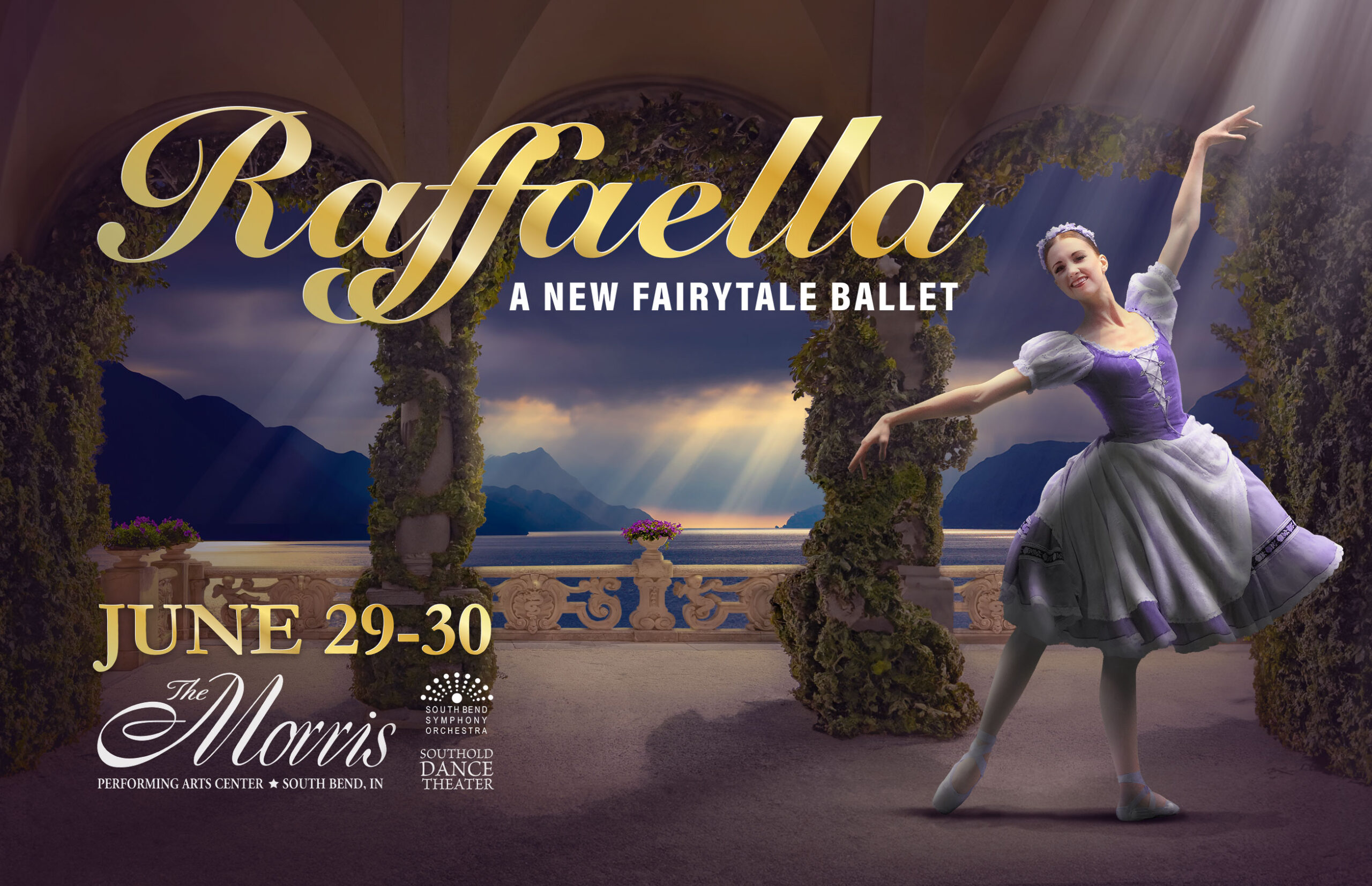
- Choreographer: Claire Kretzschmar
- Music: Michael Kurek
- Libretto: Duncan Stroik
- Premiere: June 29, 2024; Morris Performing Arts Center
- Genre: Neo-romantic
- Website: https://raffaellaballet.org/

Raffaella: A New Fairytale Ballet (or simply Raffaella) is an original ballet choreographed by Claire Kretzschmar with music by Michael Kurek, inspired by the life of ballerina Raffaella Stroik. The piece was commissioned and produced by Raffaella's parents, Ruth and Duncan Stroik. The ballet premiered on June 29, 2024, at the Morris Performing Arts Center in South Bend, Indiana.

== Background ==
Raffaella Stroik grew up in a large family and fell in love with dance at a young age. She studied dance at Southold Dance Theater in Indiana before studying ballet at the Jacobs School of Music at Indiana University with Michael Vernon and Violette Verdy. While there, she danced featured roles in classical ballets, including works by George Balanchine. In 2017, Stroik joined the St. Louis Ballet Theatre, directed by Gen Horiuchi.

On November 14, 2018, Raffaella Stroik died in a drowning accident near St. Louis, Missouri, at the age of 23. Following Raffaella's untimely death, her parents Duncan and Ruth Stroik began work on an original ballet libretto in 2019. The couple created a GoFundMe in honor of their daughter's memory to fundraise production costs for the new ballet, which has generated over $470,000 and is believed to be the largest crowdfunded ballet in U.S. history.

== Development and premiere ==
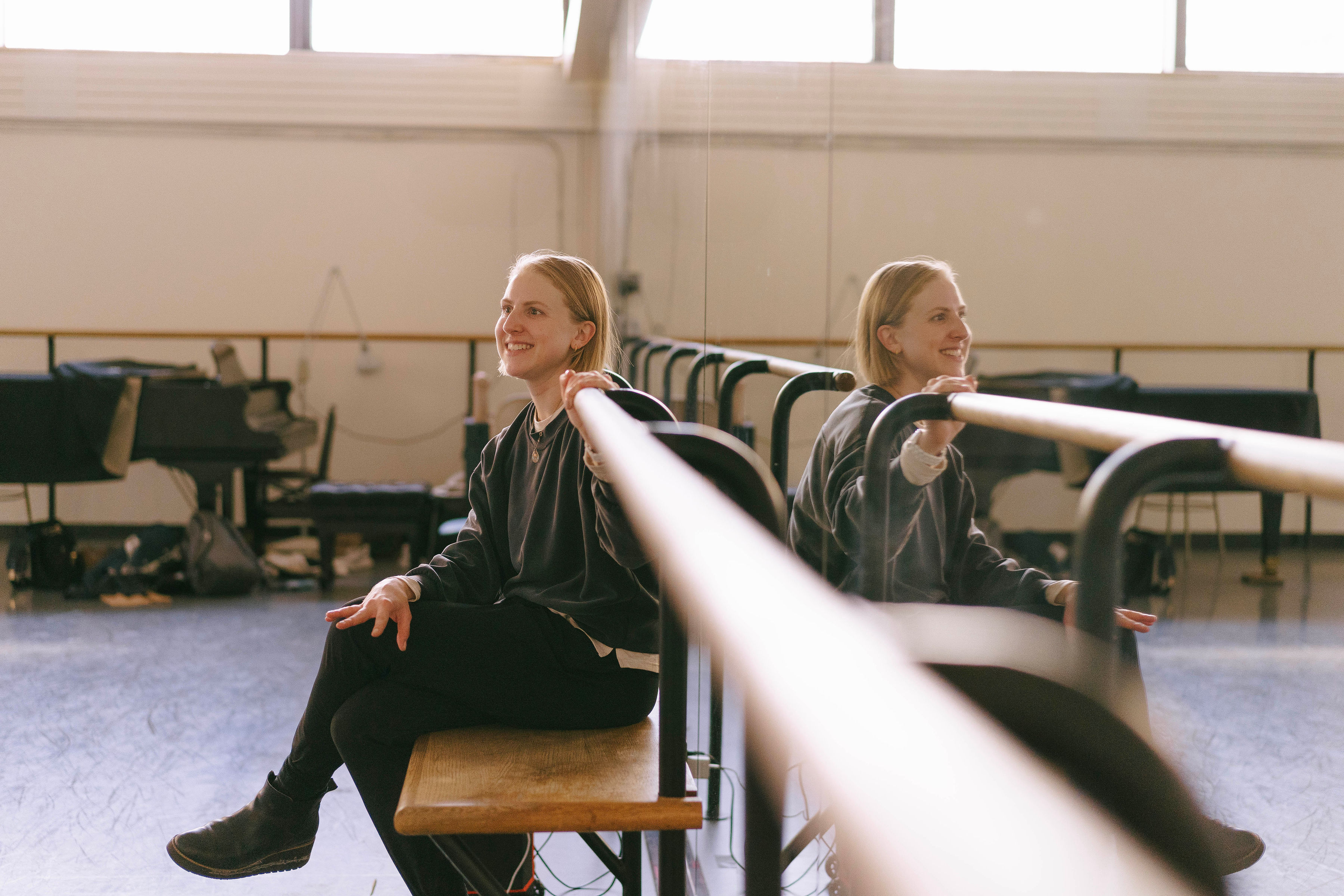
Choreographer Claire Kretzschmar

Michael Kurek, emeritus professor of music at Vanderbilt University, was commissioned to write the original score with an emphasis on traditional melody structure and tonal composition. Claire Kretzschmar, former New York City Ballet soloist and artistic director of Ballet Hartford, choreographed the piece. The ballet's classical choreography is in the spirit of Giselle, Sleeping Beauty, Swan Lake, and George Balanchine. Gabrielle Stroik Johnson, Raffaella's sister, designed the sets for the production. Robin Fountain, Emeritus Professor of Conducting at Vanderbilt University's Blair School of Music, conducted the symphony orchestra.

The ballet's libretto is based on Raffaella's life, featuring characters inspired by her friends and mentors such as Violette Verdy. The world premiere of Raffaella featured a cast of 50 dancers, many of whom had danced with Raffaella during her life. The music was performed by 42 members of the South Bend Symphony Orchestra.

== Synopsis ==
=== Act I ===
Set in the Italian village of San Michele on Lake Como, Italy during the 18th century, Raffaella is the story of a girl born to dance, welcomed at birth by a mysterious holy man and a transcendent prince. She meets friends and guides, she encounters trials: threat of death to her younger sister, the scorn of jealous rivals, and threats from other agents of deception".

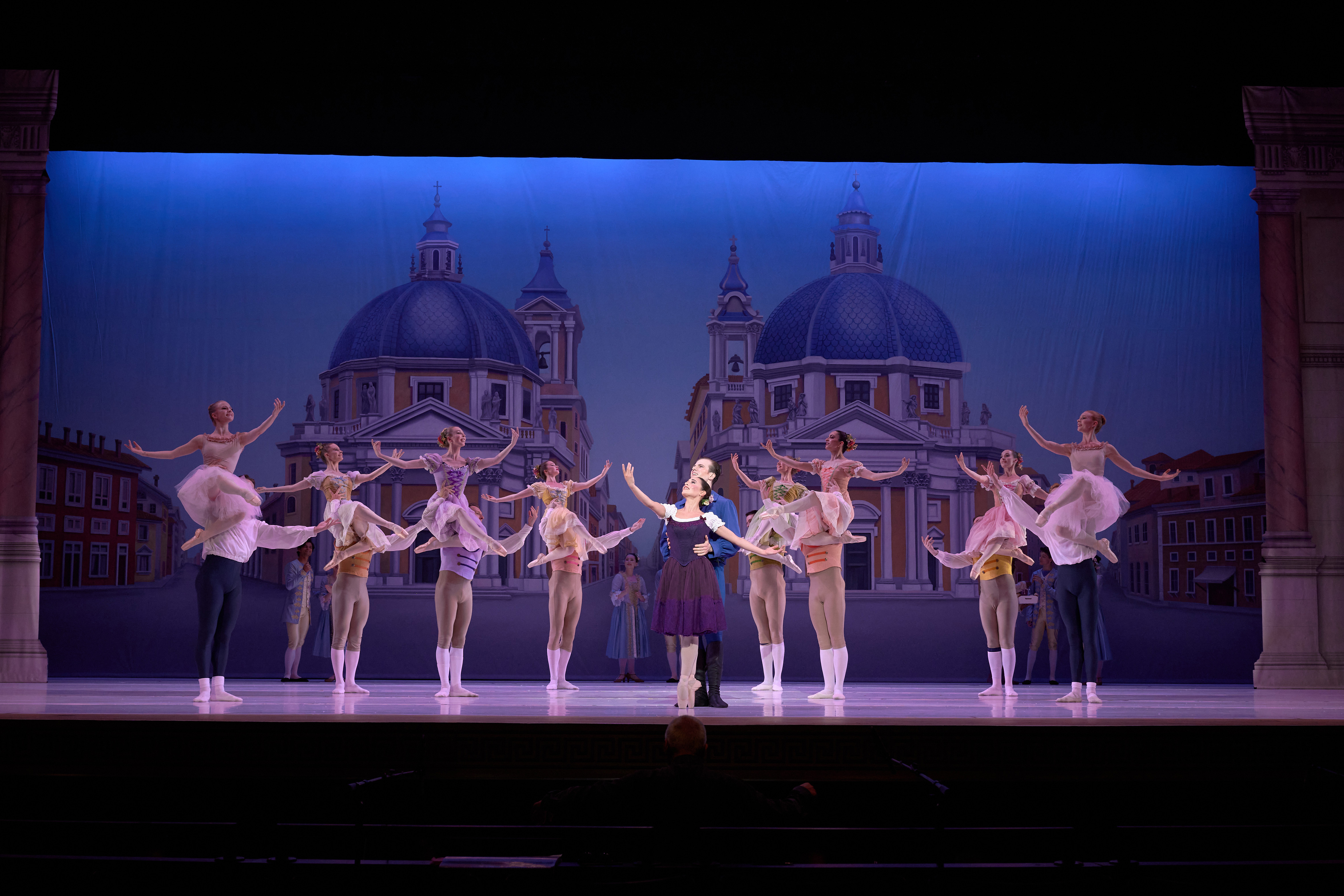
The cast of Raffaella

At nightfall, a mother and father welcome the miraculous birth of their daughter, and the next day the entire village of San Michele rejoices. A mysterious man prophesies that Raffaella will grow up to be as beautiful as a rose and that she will bring great joy into people's lives. When the mysterious man places a golden rose on the baby, the Prince sails through the air, seen only by three archangels.

When Raffaella is 14 years old, she rises early to celebrate her First Communion. The village of San Michele joins in the festivities, and Raffaella demonstrates her natural talent for ballet. Her father presents her with a gift of white roses, which in turn she shares with the children of the village. She dances joyously with the children, they in turn dance with their parents and Raffaella dreams that one day she will marry a prince. A trumpet sounds, and she goes into the Temple to prepare for her First Communion.

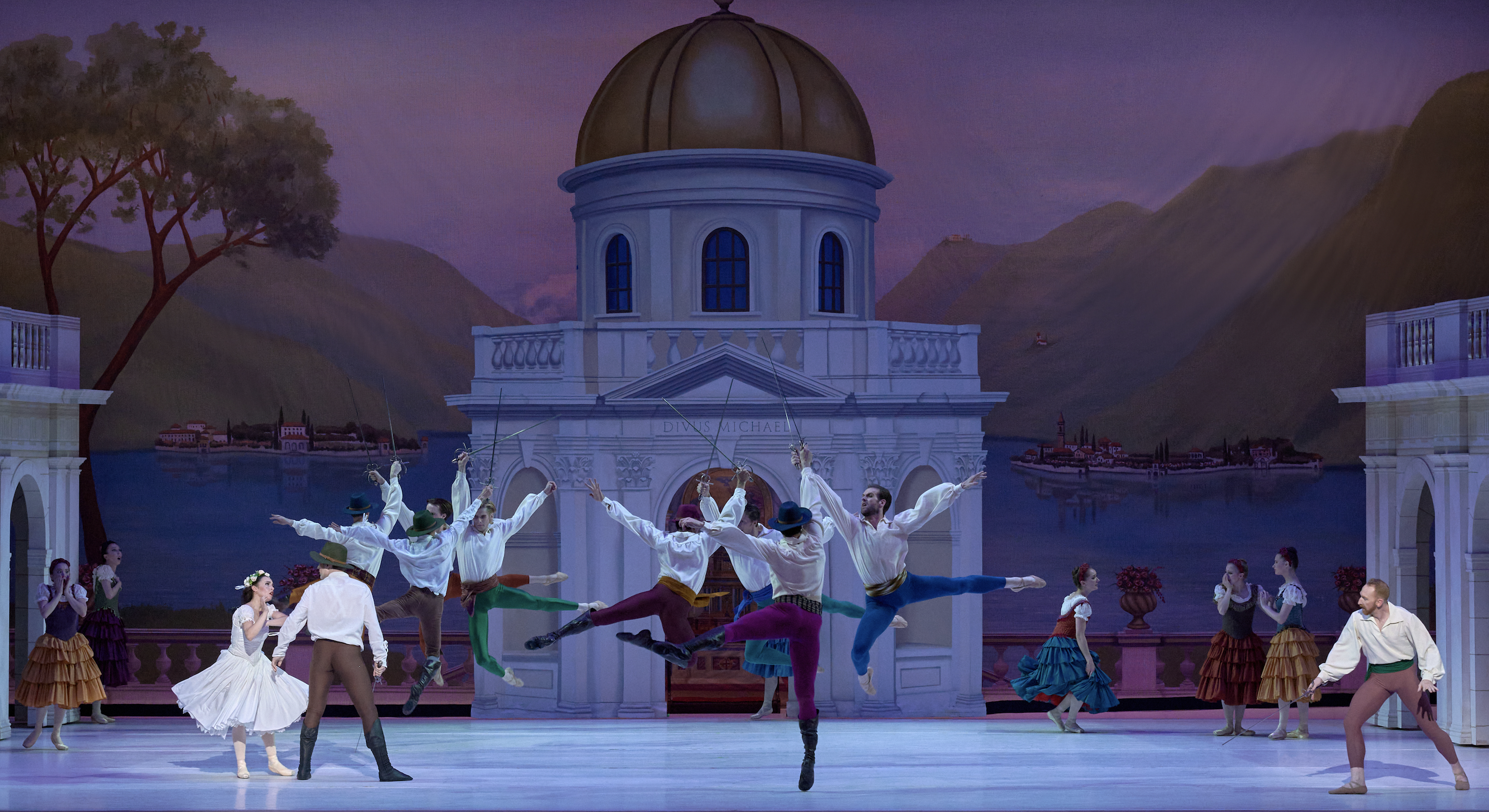
Sword Fighting Scene in Act I

While in the Temple, she unexpectedly meets a man glowing in white, and when he approaches her with great kindness, she realizes he is a Prince. When he asks her to dance, Raffaella agrees, and he teaches her a new dance that fills her with joy.

Like a flash of light, the Prince disappears from view, and the village square is once again full of people. Raffaella, filled with excitement, demonstrates the Prince's dance for the villagers. The village men are drawn to Raffaella's generosity and beauty, and seek her hand in marriage, but Raffaella proclaims her love for the Prince that only she has seen.

Raffaella's family journeys to the lake for a leisurely midday picnic, and on their way back to the village, Raffaella heroically saves her younger sister from a dangerous accident. Alarmed, they return to San Michele to find a second catastrophe about to begin, men from a rival village seeking revenge upon San Michele for a past grievance. A dramatic sword fight ensues, in which Raffaella's friend Antonio is involved. Raffaella tries to prevent the fighting and almost gets killed. Finally, the Duke of San Michele breaks up the fight, and Raffaella pleads with him to be lenient on the young men, out of a desire to help her friend Antonio. When the tensions subside, Raffaella sees a golden rose on the ground, and wonders from whence it came.

=== Act II ===
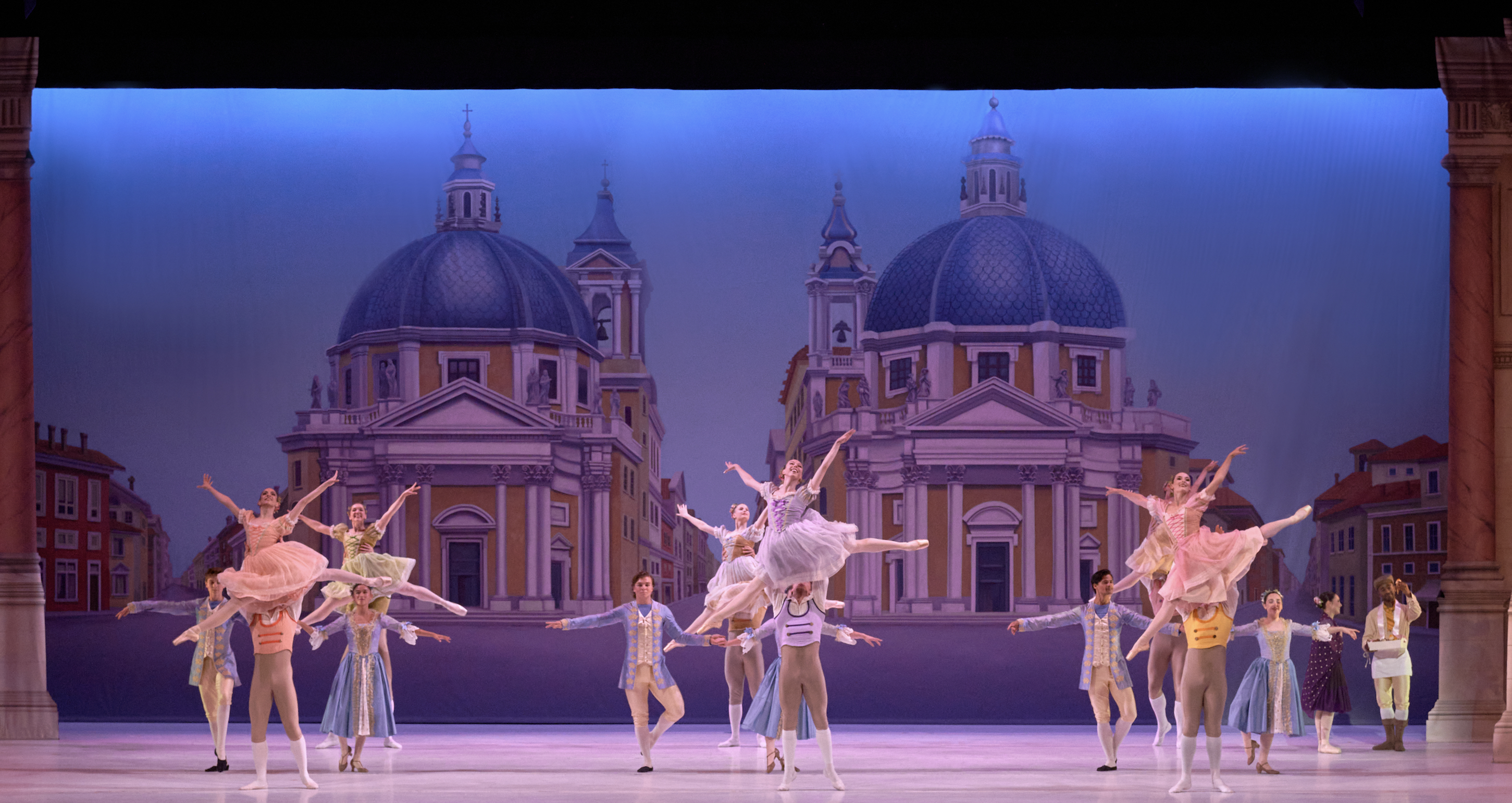
The cast of Raffaella

When Raffaella comes of age, she leaves her family and moves to Rome to study. While there, Raffaella observes the architecture, cuisine, and people of the city. She attends a ballet school led by the Emerald Queen, a teacher who welcomes, challenges, and trains her in ballet. Raffaella's interest in the Emerald Queen and ballet leads her to dance with more freedom.

At the ballet school, Raffaella meets Ombroso, a charming young prince who is an incredible dancer. He practices a beautiful pas de deux with Raffaella and expresses his love for her. Then to her surprise he promises that he will make her a princess, and offers her a jeweled crown. Raffaella is tempted but when she chooses not to accept the crown, Ombroso becomes angry with her. He lashes out at Raffaella for rejecting his gift, and Raffaella realizes that he is a false prince.

With no one to turn to, Raffaella calls out for help. Suddenly, three angels appear, and behind them is a man gleaming in white, whom she recognizes as the true Prince. The true Prince leads his angels in a battle against the false Prince Ombroso and his retinue, and the angels are victorious. The angels then disappear, leaving Raffaella and the Prince alone. Raffaella and the Prince dance together, expressing joy for the victory over Prince Ombroso and his demons. Time seems to have stopped.

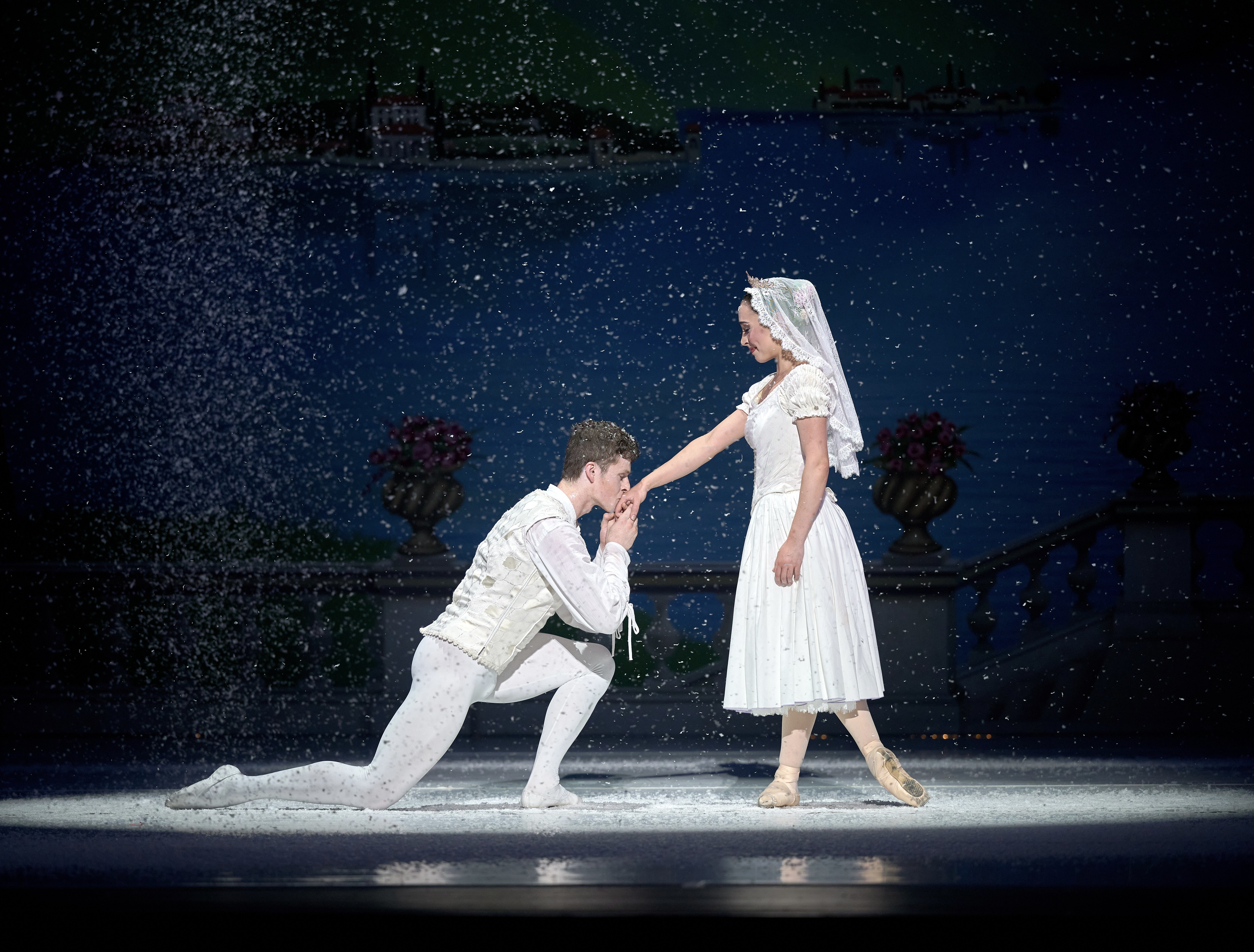
Paul Zusi and Leah McFadden in Raffaella

Raffaella returns to San Michele. Still in a romantic daze, the village women tease her, saying that she is in love with a man who is invisible. Some of the village men, including Antonio, vie for her hand in marriage. Raffaella offers them roses but chooses to dance with the young man with crutches. The village women and men continue to taunt Raffaella, and she departs for the lake to be alone.

At the lake, Raffaella contemplates all that she has experienced in her life and pours her thoughts into her movements. She remembers all the people who have touched her life - the Emerald Queen, the village men, the village women, and her family. Prince Ombroso and his demons linger in her mind, but the true Prince arrives in time to save her.

Raffaella expresses her great love for the Prince in a powerful pas de deux by the lake. It begins to snow, and he invites her to come away with him to his kingdom. Raffaella does not want to leave her family and friends behind, but her love for the Prince persuades her to go with him.

Raffaella sees her family, and she tells them that her love for the Prince compels her to go away with him to his kingdom. Before she goes, four children arrive at the lake and present Raffaella with a crown, which she happily accepts. Amidst the snow, the Prince leads Raffaella to his mountaintop kingdom, a place of joy and the beauty that saves the world.

== Score ==
In 2022, Michael Kurek released Symphony No. 2: Tales from the Realm of Faerie, which was inspired by the fairytale tradition and adheres to the classical symphonic structure. Kurek described his compositional approach as seeking to capture "a certain spirit of unspoiled beauty, innocence, and heroic goodness." Inspired by Kurek's melodic approach to music composition, Ruth and Duncan Stroik commissioned Kurek to write the score for Raffaella.

The National Catholic Register called Kurek's orchestrations for Raffaella "lush, expressive and emotional." The score features several leitmotifs from Catholic Gregorian chant including Salve Regina and Tantum Ergo. In an interview with Notre Dame Magazine, Kurek emphasized his interest in tonality and writing "memorable melodies" for Raffaella.

== Videography ==
Due to popular request, a multi-angle live stage recording of the ballet will be offered to the public October 31, 2024. The footage was recorded at the ballet's premiere in South Bend, Indiana by Dancing Fox Pictures.

== Original cast (South Bend 2024) ==
- Leah McFadden (Raffaella)
- Paul Zusi (The Prince)
- Grace Armstrong
- Mark-David Bloodgood (Mysterious Man, Ombroso)
- Maggie Bucko
- Daniel Cooke
- Simon Costello (Duke)
- Robert Fulton (Antonio)
- Christina Ghiardi (The Emerald Queen)
- Dylan Keane
- Camille Kellems
- Trinity Koch
- Chris Lingner
- Jessica Lopes
- Ella Martin
- Regina Murphy
- Jordan Nelson
- Trevor Pinter Parsons
- Matthew Rusk
- Michael Sayre (Father)
- Isaac Sharratt
- Mayim Stiller
- Theresa Thomas (Mother)
- Colby Treat
- Avery Ward
- Ben Zusi

== Critical reception ==
Jane Coombs wrote in The Wall Street Journal that:

"Ms. Kretzschmar has choreographed an impeccably paced ballet that builds to a moving conclusion, propelled by Mr. Kurek’s neo-romantic music that synchronizes closely with the pantomime. Raffaella Stroik once explained, “When I am on stage, I just feel this amazing joy and love and I just want the audience to feel that way.” Anyone fortunate enough to have attended “Raffaella” will have felt just that."

In Airmail, Laura Jacobs wrote: "“For many young women, the commitment to classical dance is not unlike a religious calling. Both require daily discipline, are devoted to form, and allow the self to be absorbed into a higher plane. Raffaella Stroik was such a dancer.”

Nadia Vostrikov of Ballet Herald noted that: “In thinking back to the tribute ballets I have heard of, most seem to be reserved for celebrity musicians (Joni Mitchell, The Rolling Stones, Radiohead) and none in the classical story ballet style. Raffaella has the potential to be this century’s Giselle or Sleeping Beauty but with a twist of inspiration from a real individual."
