= Morristown, New Jersey (disambiguation) =

Morristown, New Jersey is a town in Morris County.

Morristown, New Jersey may also refer to:

- Morristown, community in Old Bridge Township, New Jersey

== See also ==
- Morris County, New Jersey
- Mauricetown, New Jersey in Cumberland County
- Moorestown, New Jersey in Burlington County
- Morris Plains, New Jersey in Morris County
- Morris Township, New Jersey in Morris County
- Morristown (disambiguation)
