= Christ Chapel (Hillsdale College) =

Ecumenical Christian chapel at Hillsdale College, Michigan, US

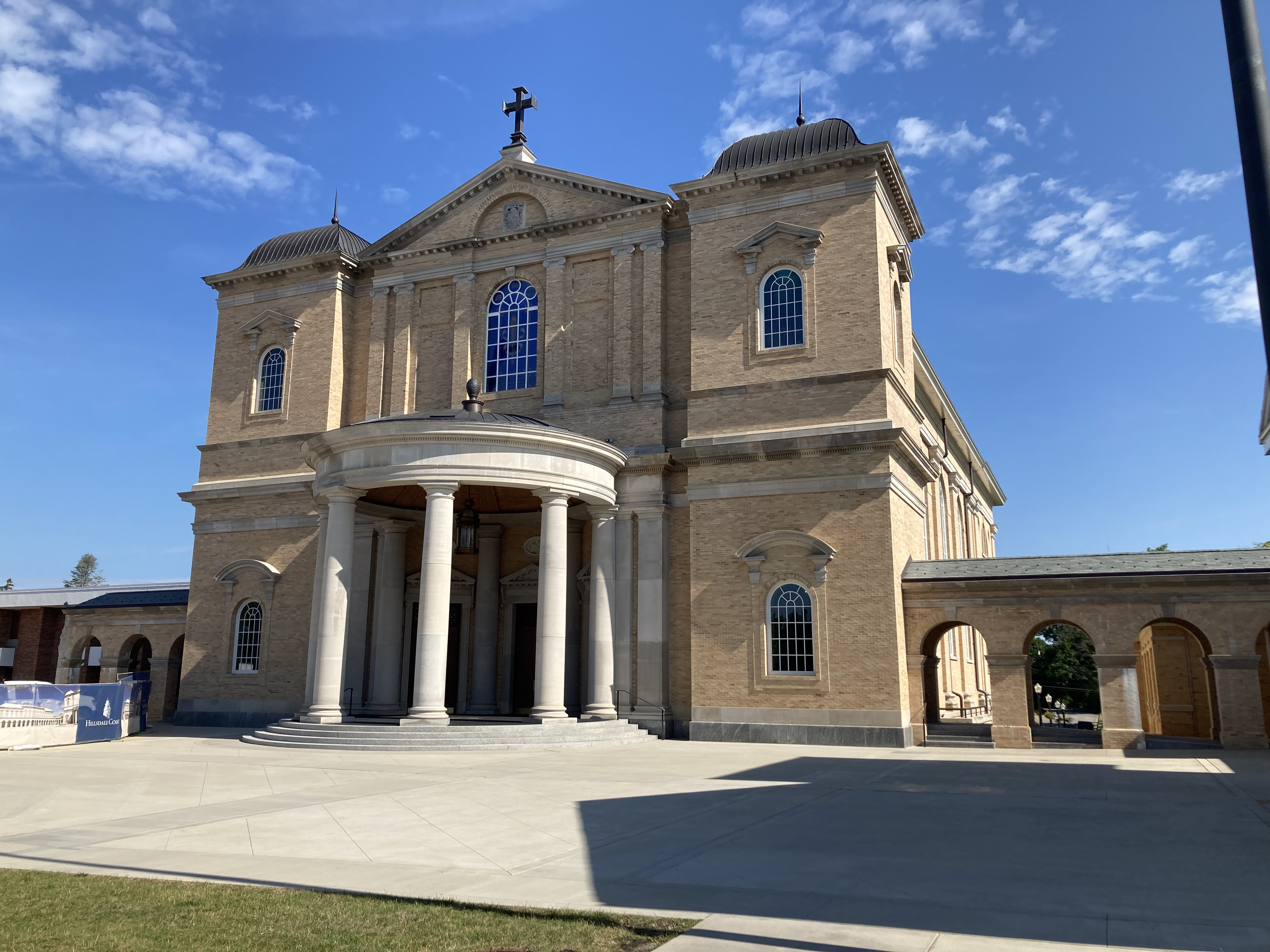
- Christ Chapel in 2024
- Location: 33 East College Street; Hillsdale, Michigan
- Country: United States
- Website: hillsdale.edu/about/facilities/christ-chapel-23/

History
- Dedicated: October 3, 2019

Architecture
- Architect: Duncan G. Stroik
- Architectural type: Neoclassical
- Years built: 2017–2019
- Completed: 2019
- Construction cost: $28.5 million

Specifications
- Capacity: 1,350
- Height: 70 feet (21 m)
- Materials: Brick, limestone, marble

Christ Chapel is an ecumenical Christian chapel located on the campus on Hillsdale College in Hillsdale, Michigan. Constructed from 2017 to 2019, the $28.5 million chapel seating 1,350 is located on Hillsdale's main quadrangle as an architectural centerpiece of the campus. The chapel was designed by prominent traditionalist architect Duncan G. Stroik in a neoclassical style intended to evoke the work of Christopher Wren and early Georgian churches in the United States. Upon its dedication in 2019, the chapel was noted for being the largest classical chapel constructed in the United States in 70 years.

== History ==
=== Planning ===
Hillsdale College is a conservative college in southeastern Michigan that had grown significantly in the late 20th and early 21st centuries. Known for its decision not to accept federal or state educational funding, Hillsdale fundraises extensively, raising $100–150 million per year in the 2010s and over $200 million per year in the 2020s. Although Hillsdale was founded by Free Will Baptists, it had always operated as a non-sectarian school and did not include a freestanding chapel on campus. However, amid Hillsdale's growth in attendance, President Larry P. Arnn saw a need for an ecumenical space for worship on campus, saying at the time that "[t]here has never been a great university that was not heavily concerned with the question of God. There has never been serious Christian practice that was not heavily concerned with learning. Christ Chapel will be a daily reminder of this central fact." The chapel would need to facilitate worship for both Hillsdale's Protestant majority and its substantial minority, roughly 30 percent, of Roman Catholics.

Fundraising for the $28.5 million project started with a $12.5 million gift from Hillsdale donors Jack and Jo Babbitt. The early gift allowed the college to commission Duncan Stroik, a professor at the University of Notre Dame and a prolific designer of Catholic churches and college buildings, to begin designing the chapel.

=== Construction ===
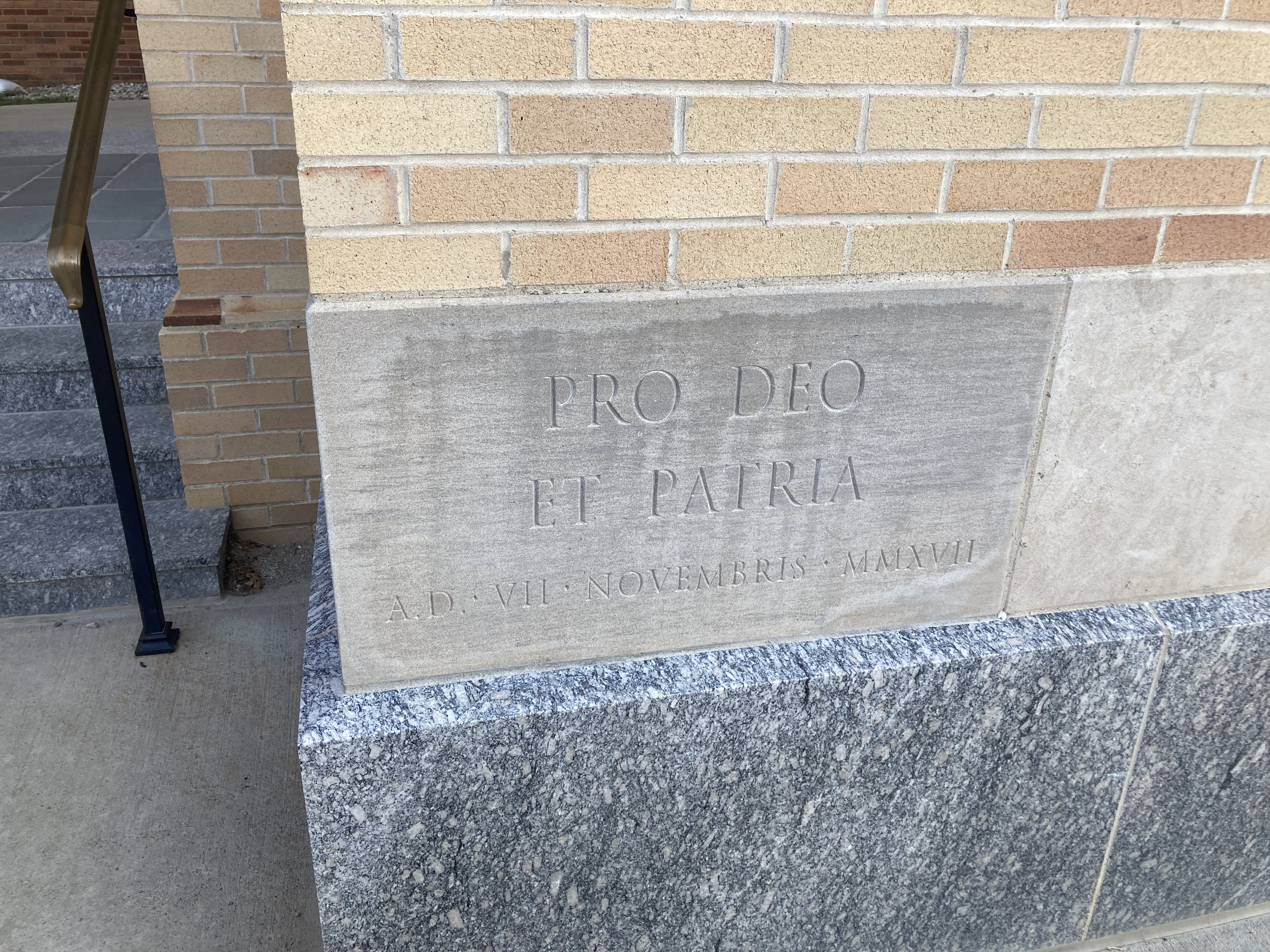
The cornerstone laid in 2017.

Construction began in March 2017. The chapel's cornerstone was laid on November 7, 2017. Weigand Construction was the project contractor, with Christ Chapel its seventh project for the college.

=== Dedication ===
The chapel was dedicated on October 3, 2019. Supreme Court Justice Clarence Thomas was the keynote speaker, and in his remarks he highlighted the significance of building a college chapel in "this age of popular iconoclasm," describing Christ Chapel as "a public declaration that faith and reason are mutually enforcing." He added:

The college years require young people to make decisions that will affect the rest of their lives. They are exposed to new ideas, new relationships, new distractions and new temptations. They need a place where they can go to be relieved of their troubles and what they are bearing as so much comes at them so fast. By building this chapel, Hillsdale College has provided that space where students can come to discern God’s calling, to pray through difficult times, and to praise God for his faithfulness. . . . Chapels are particularly important in providing a place for the burdened, the broken-hearted and the despairing. When life is difficult and seems pointless, we need a safe haven where we can escape from the storm and find solace.

Other guests at the dedication included Hillsdale College board chairman Pat Sajak and journalist Mollie Hemingway. Choral music performed at the service included Hubert Parry's "I was glad" and Johannes Brahms' setting of Psalm 84.

=== Use ===
As of the summer of 2024, the chapel is open daily and used for regular campus worship events, including a new choral evensong service envisioned by Arnn. Former Vice President Mike Pence spoke at Christ Chapel in 2023.

The chapel is also used for community events. In July 2024, the chapel was filled to capacity for the funeral services for Hillsdale County sheriff's deputy Bill Butler Jr., who had been killed by a driver during a routine traffic stop.

== Architecture ==
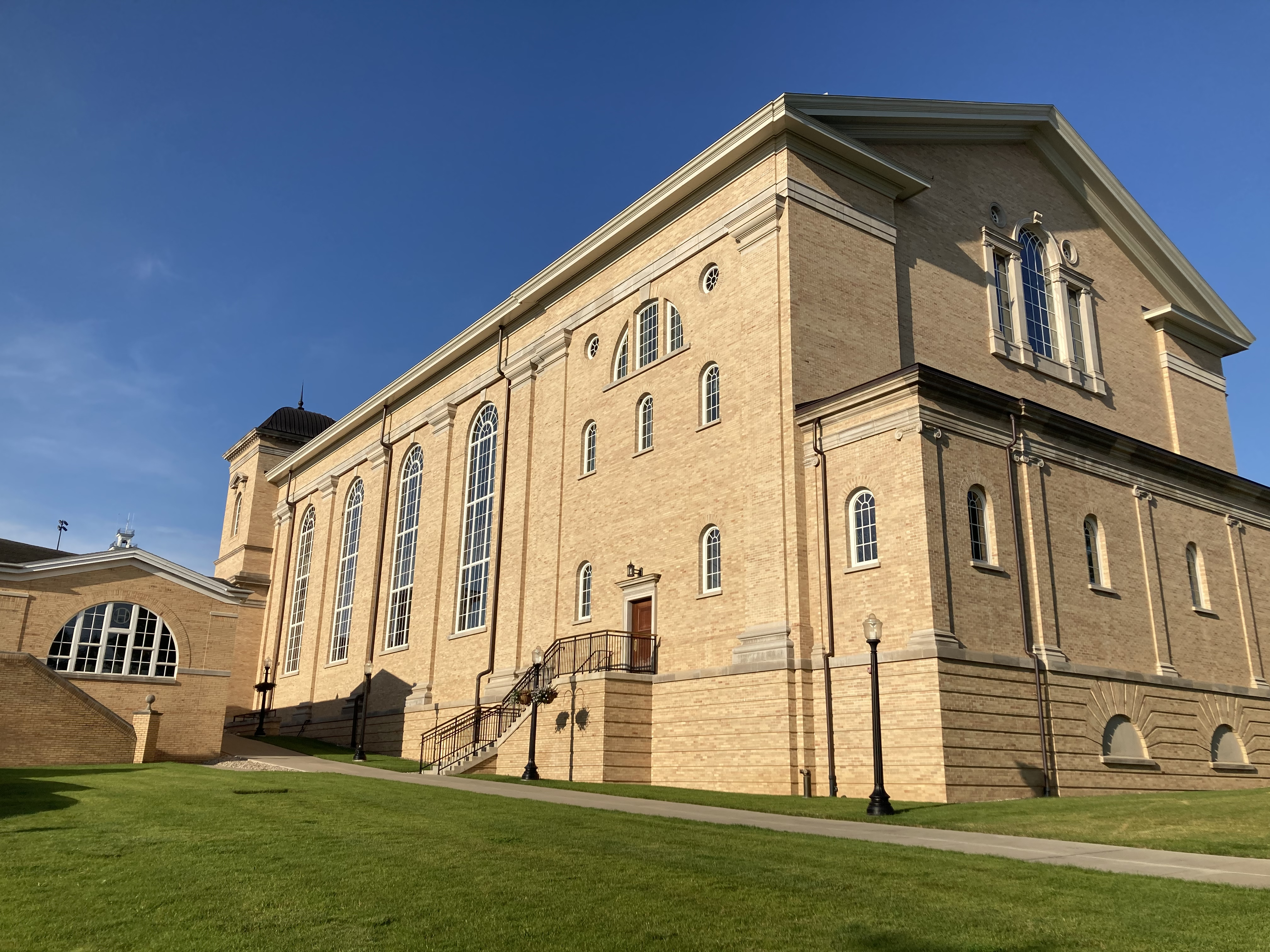
View from the northeast.

The chapel's primary motif is Doric, with Renaissance detailing and elements inspired by English churches of Wren and James Gibbs and American Georgian churches. Stroik specifically cited St. Martin-in-the-Fields in London and Christ Church in Philadelphia as influences. Stroik noted that "Christ Church was where the founding fathers met when they had the Continental Congress. We’re connecting two buildings and two events."

=== Exterior ===
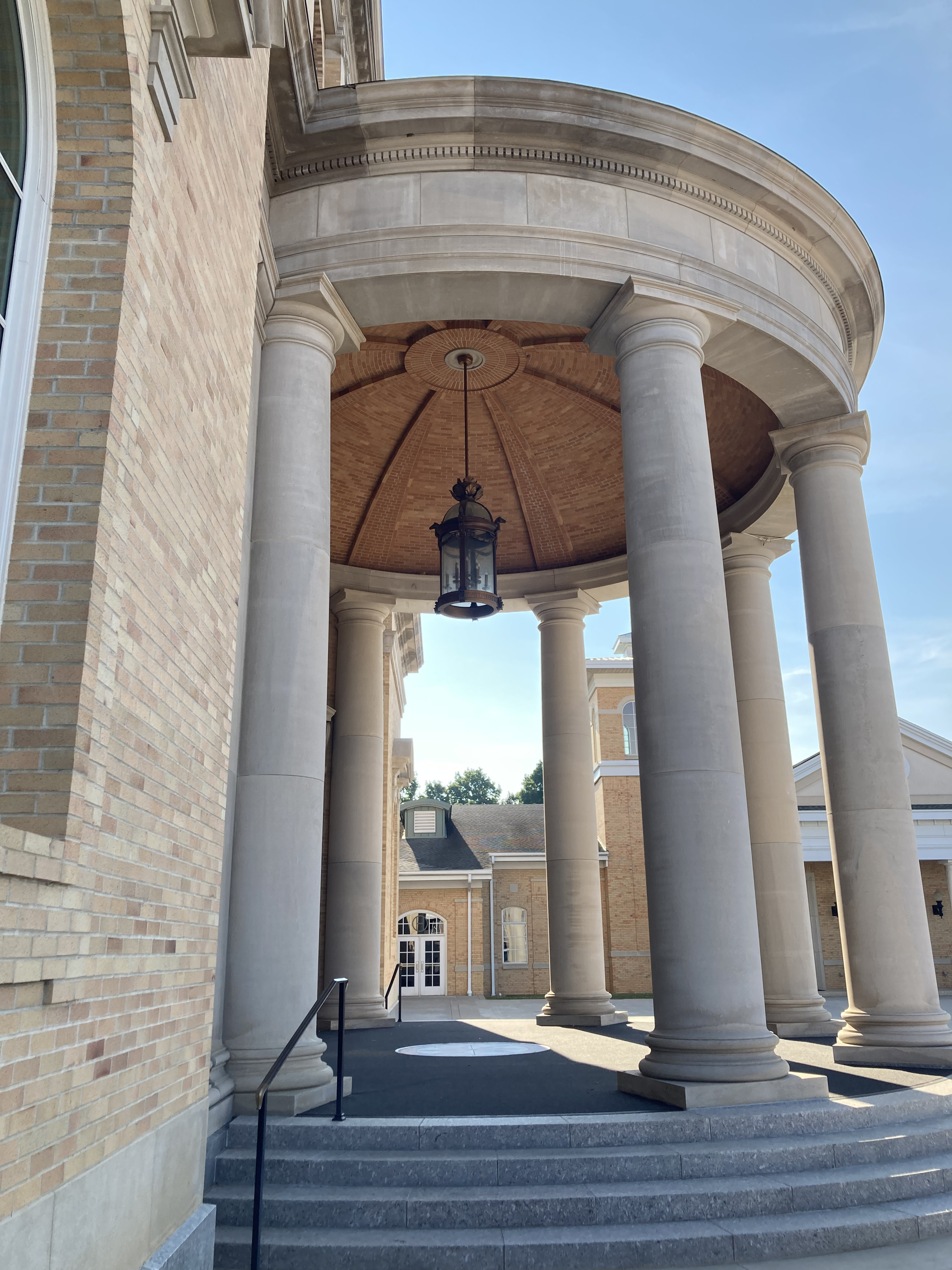
The portico and interior brick dome.

The exterior of the chapel is faced mostly with buff-colored brick trimmed with Indiana limestone. The 70-foot-tall façade faces the college's main quadrangle at the opposite end from its historic Italianate Central Building. The buff brick was selected to match the color of other buildings on the quad, and the chapel is flanked with arcades that connect to an existing building on one side and that will connect to an under-construction building on the other side.

Each side of the building is marked by four 28-foot-tall Palladian windows. Above the altar in the chancel is the chapel's only Venetian window.

The entrance portico is formed by tholos partially recessed into the façade. The tholos is formed by eight Doric limestone columns, and the dome inside the portico is made of self-supporting red brick and spans 32 feet. The brickwork on the dome inside was built using the Guastavino technique (but interlocking brick instead of tile). The ribs of the dome were built with two layers of brick keyed together with a header course in which the bricks are placed with the short end exposed. The top of the dome is clad with copper standing seam panels and topped with a five-foot-three-inch pinecone finial that was handmade using the repoussé method involving hand-hammering copper sheets into a mold. In the portico, three convex entrance doors are marked with roundels, each made of different-colored marble, featuring the Latin names of the three theological virtues: Fides (faith), Spes (hope) and Caritas (charity).

=== Interior ===
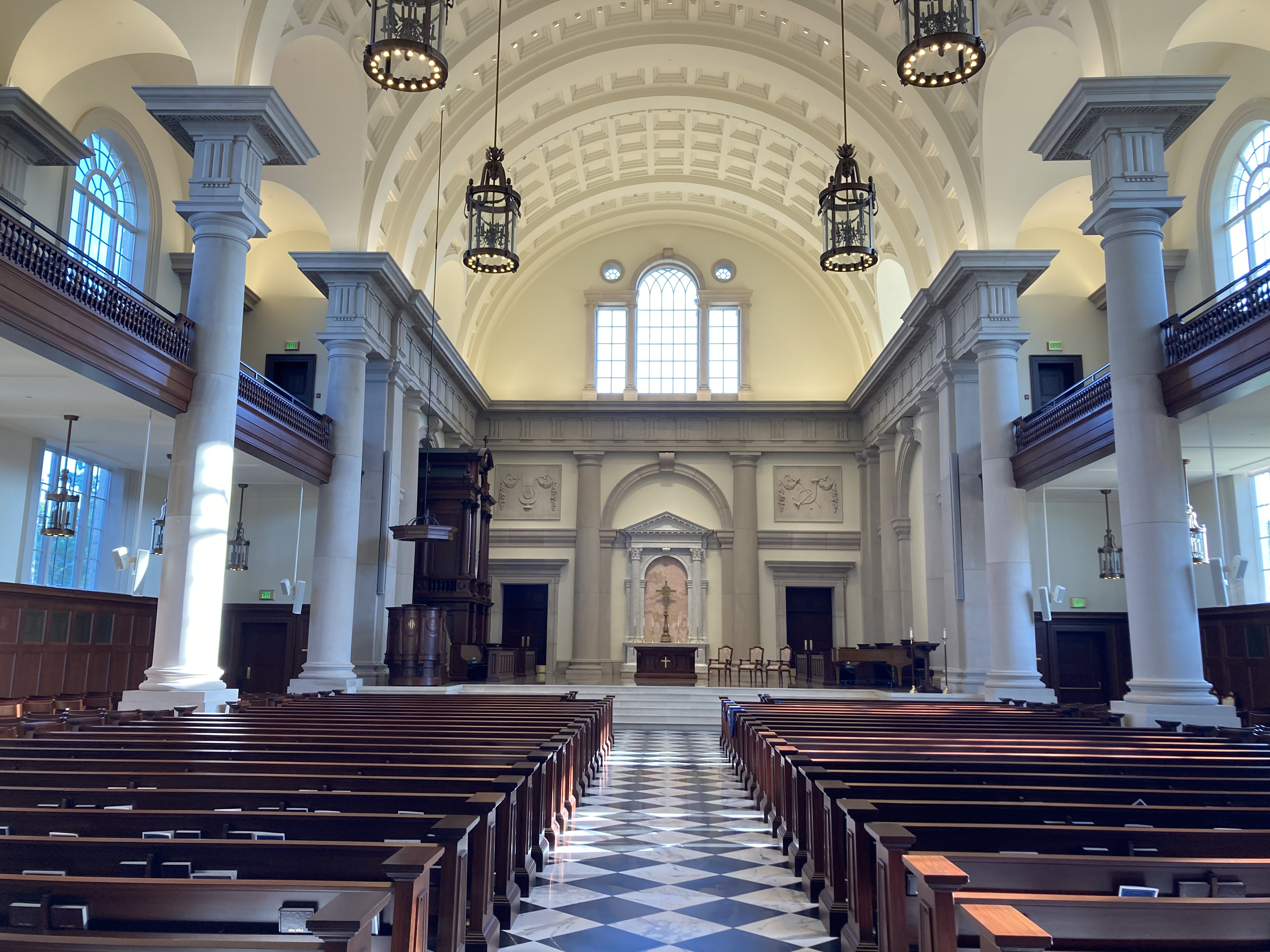
View of the nave looking toward the altar.

The marble narthex features symbols of Christianity: the Ark of the Covenant, the Chi Rho, the Trinity and a dove representing the Holy Spirit.

In the nave, 28-foot load-bearing Doric limestone columns support the 64-foot-high barrel vault ceiling. In order to meet the college's need for flexibility in the space, Stroik designed the open area of the nave to seat roughly 600 people, creating a more intimate space for smaller services. For larger and special events, seating in the galleries and under them on either side of the nave allows the chapel to accommodate roughly 800 more. "It was an interesting tension to have a place of worship also function as a state-of-the-art musical performance hall," Stroik said, "because my view of sacred space is to set it apart and not have it be used for profane purposes." At the top of the ten arches separating the columns are gold-leaf escutcheons bearing names of the fruits of the Holy Spirit in Latin.

The chancel features a mahogany pulpit and sounding board, a lectern, an organ designed for choral accompaniment, and enough space for Hillsdale's 100-voice choir and chamber ensemble. While the chancel is ringed by limestone Doric columns and entablature, the altar is framed by Corinthian columns and a pediment in marble illuminated by the Venetian window directly above. The floors of the chancel and nave are also marble.

The building also includes a wood-paneled small day chapel for private worship. The day chapel has a stained-glass depiction of the baptism of Jesus over its altar.

== Organs ==
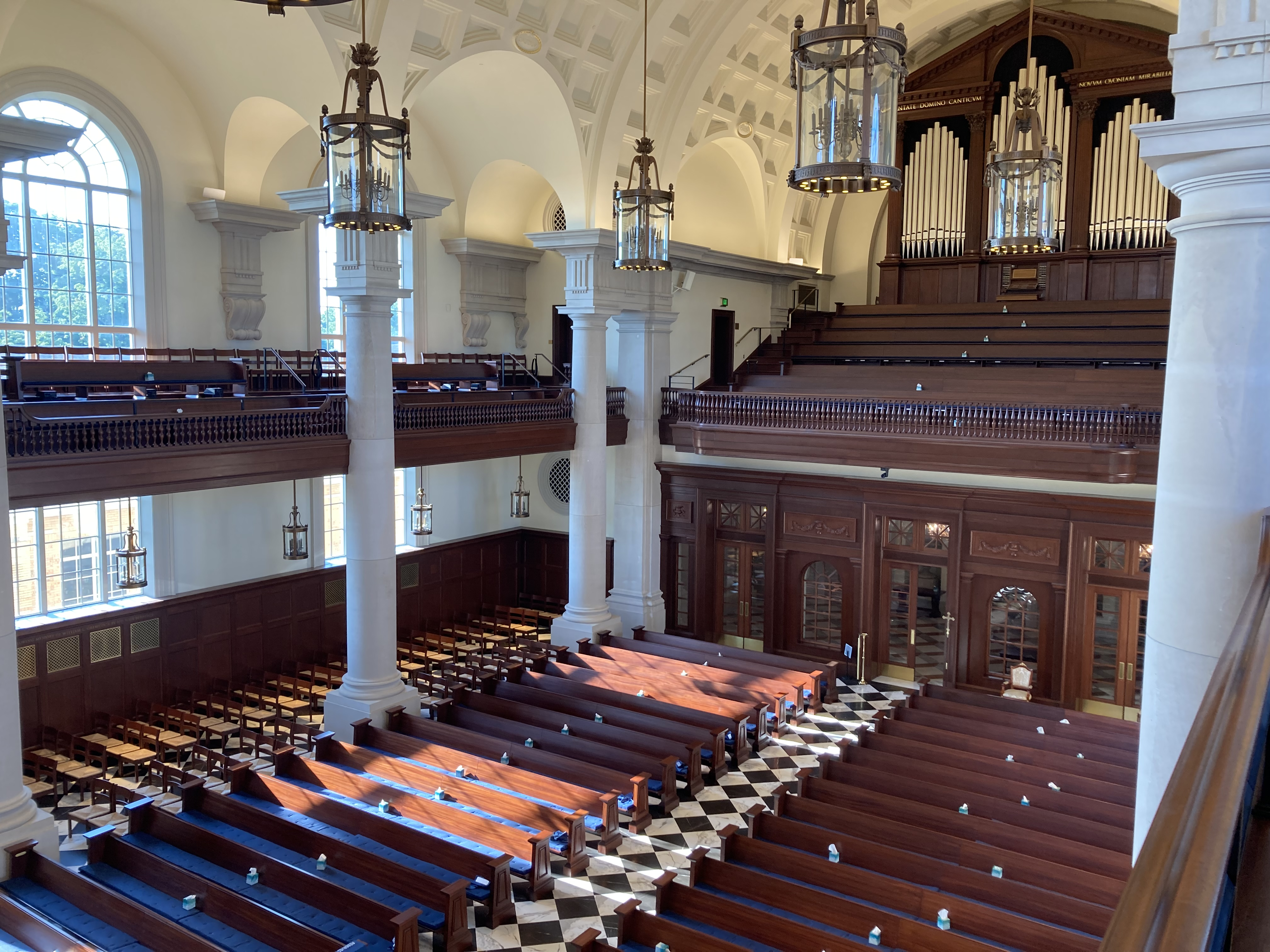
The chapel's gallery organ.

Christ Chapel features two organs built by Paul Fritts and Company. To accommodate the need to seat the college's orchestra and choir in the chancel for performances, the decision was made to avoid having a single organ that would completely fulfill the chapel's accompaniment needs; instead, a smaller chancel pipe organ would be combined with an organ in the rear gallery.

The smaller organ in the chancel measures 24 feet high and 13 feet wide. It was completed with the overall chapel and has 30 stops among three divisions in 38 ranks and with 1,854 pipes. It was designed for use with orchestral and choral performances. The larger organ in the gallery, measuring 30 feet high by 30 feet wide, has three manuals and pedal. It features 57 stops in 85 ranks with 4,115 pipes. Its installation was completed in October 2022.

Both organs are housed in sapele mahogany cases designed by Stroik. The cases feature "broken" pediments, columns and capitals. Both organs include "suspended mechanical key actions providing a light but easily controlled touch while sending tactile feedback to the player," as well as mechanical stop actions. The gallery organ has its own dedicated air conditioning system to help keep vertically separated divisions in tune during unseasonable weather.

== Reception ==
While Stroik was known for his Catholic architecture, Hillsdale intended to build an ecumenical Christian chapel. The result was described by Liturgical Arts Journal as "a chapel that is not a specifically a 'big-C' Catholic one, but which is grounded in a 'small-c' sense of catholicity, rooted in the classical tradition." Commentator Dennis Lennox remarked on how the interior evokes the Anglican churches of Wren and Nicholas Hawksmoor while its liturgical west front "looks very Roman Catholic."

In Touchstone, Michael Ward used the phrase "mere Christian," coined by C. S. Lewis to describe the essentials of Christian belief, to describe the ecumenism of the chapel. "That Christ Chapel should have been designed by a Catholic but in a mostly Anglican or Protestant register indicates something of the ecumenical spirit that Hillsdale aims to foster," he wrote. "President Arnn sees the building as a 'mere Christian' kind of space, a place where the different spiritual traditions present among the student body (and indeed among the faculty) can all feel welcome, where commonalities can be celebrated and Balkanization avoided." For example, it incorporates Protestant motifs in making the focal point above the altar a cross (but not a crucifix). The chapel design also avoids using either stained glass (except in the day chapel) or statuary. However, according to Ward, it includes Catholic symbols, such as a relief in the chancel of a pelican in her piety, and the Latin emblazoned within the building.

Critiquing the chapel's overall effect for The New Criterion, Roger Kimball described the chapel as "chastely sumptuous" and "classically inflected." Kimball commented that "[w]hen you walk into Christ Chapel, you catch your breath in response to the soaring grandeur of the space. Its stateliness lifts the spirit and puts you, Arnn noted, in mind of 'ultimate things.'"

=== Awards ===
For his work on Christ Chapel, Stroik was recognized with a 2021 Palladio Award for a design of less than 30,000 square feet from the Traditional Building Conference. In 2021, the chapel was one of 12 projects recognized by the Copper Development Association's North American Copper in Architecture awards, which cited the copper roof of the dome.

== Gallery ==
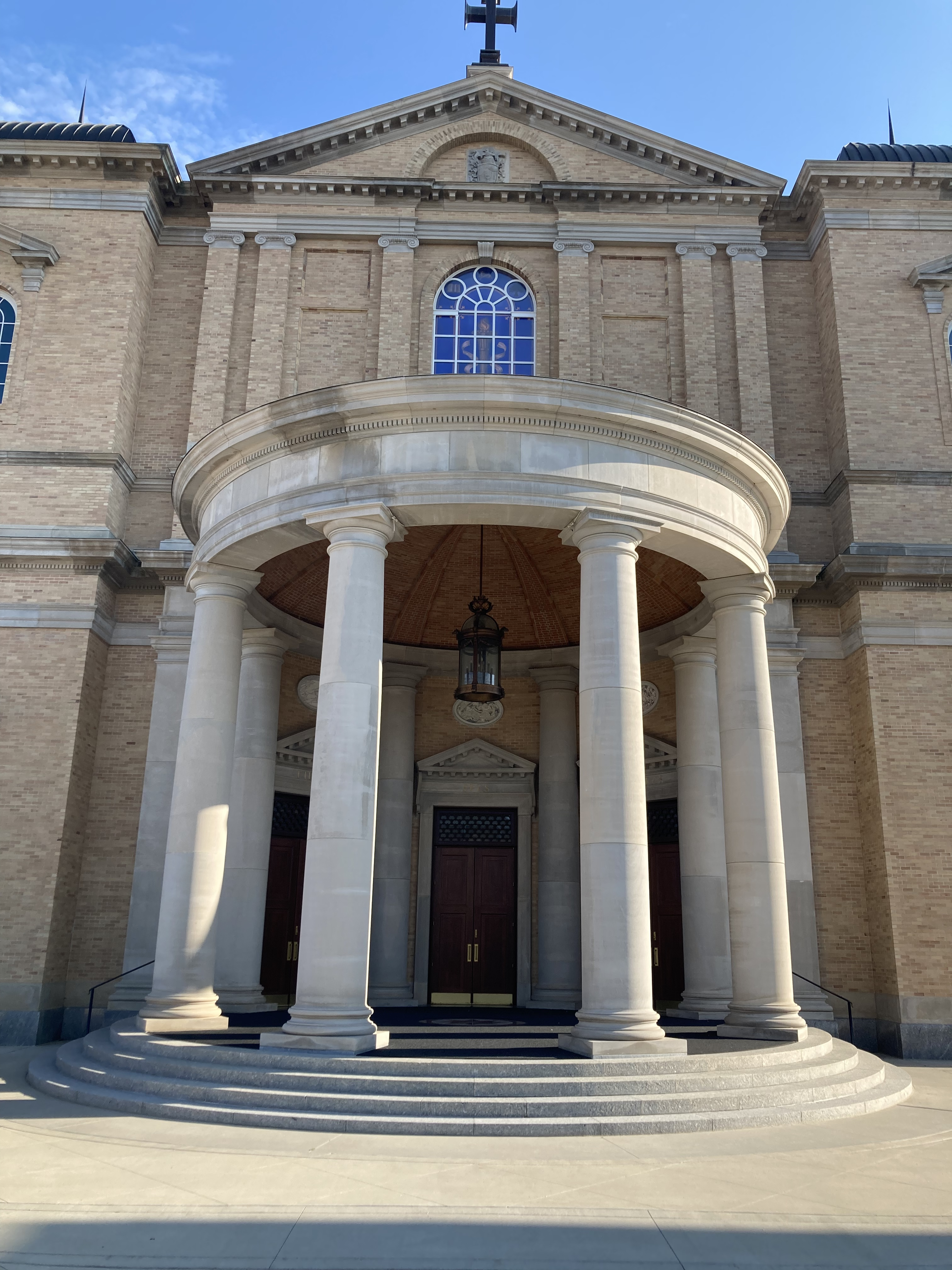
Front of chapel

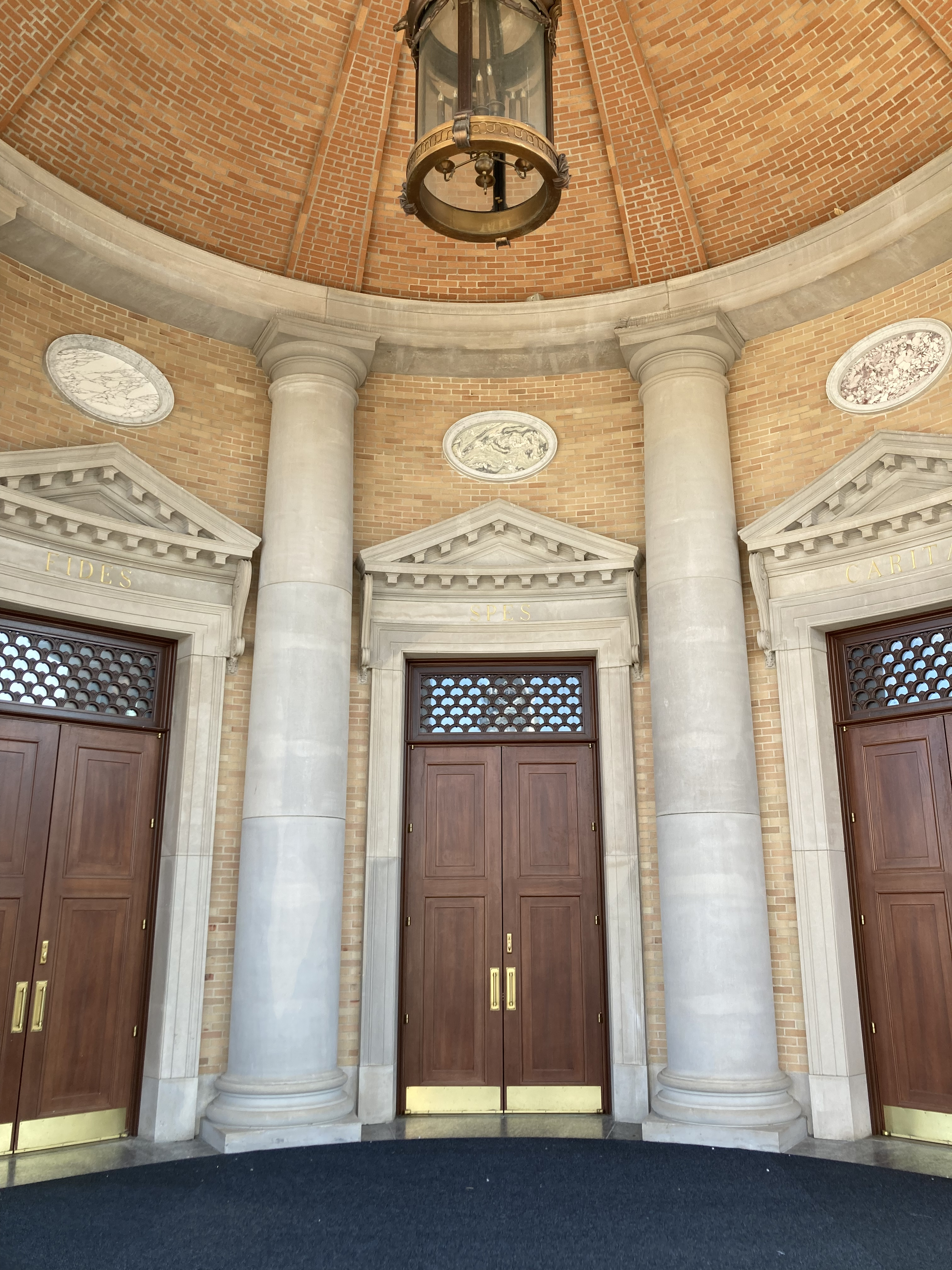
Entrance portico

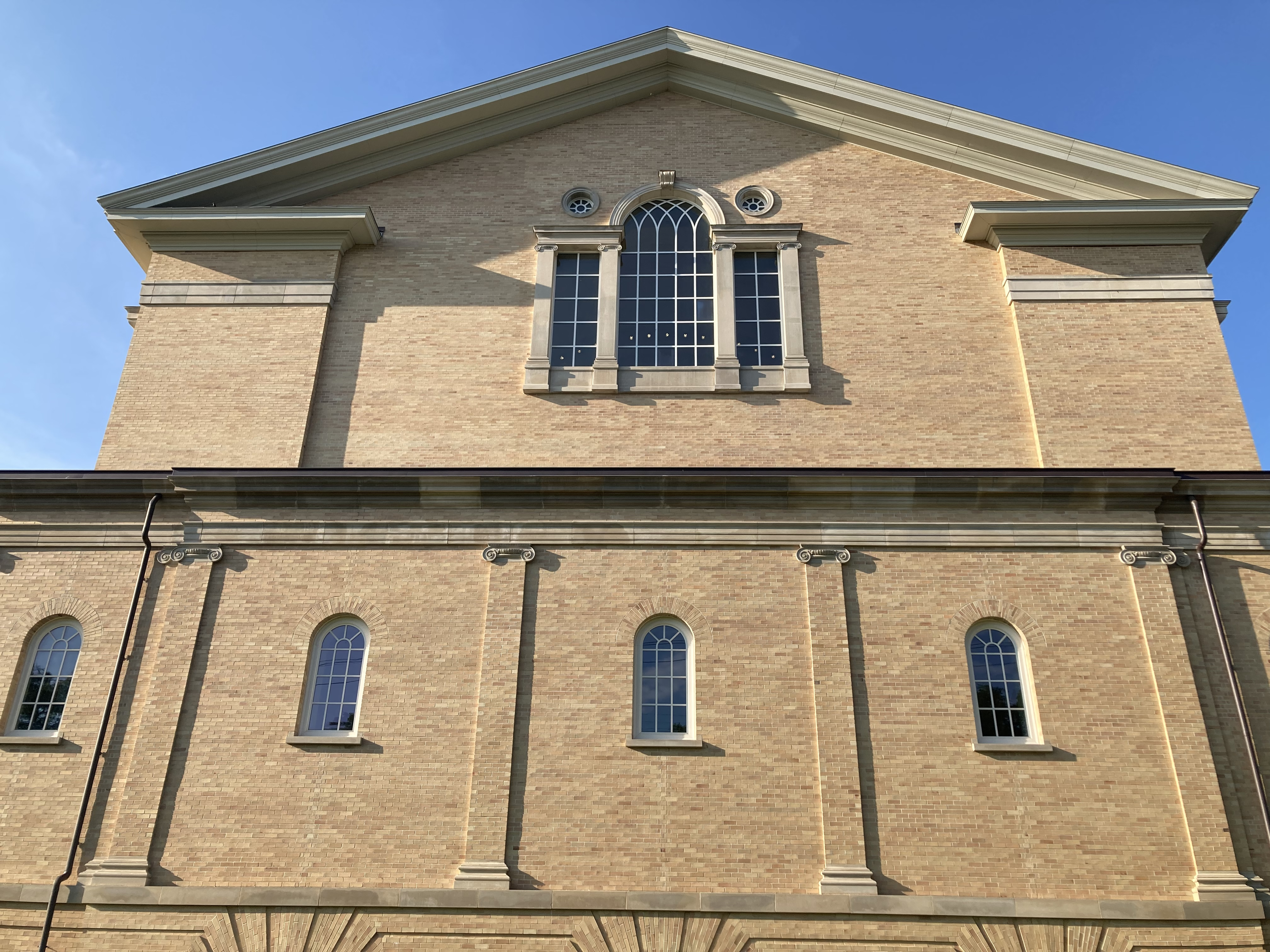
Rear of chapel

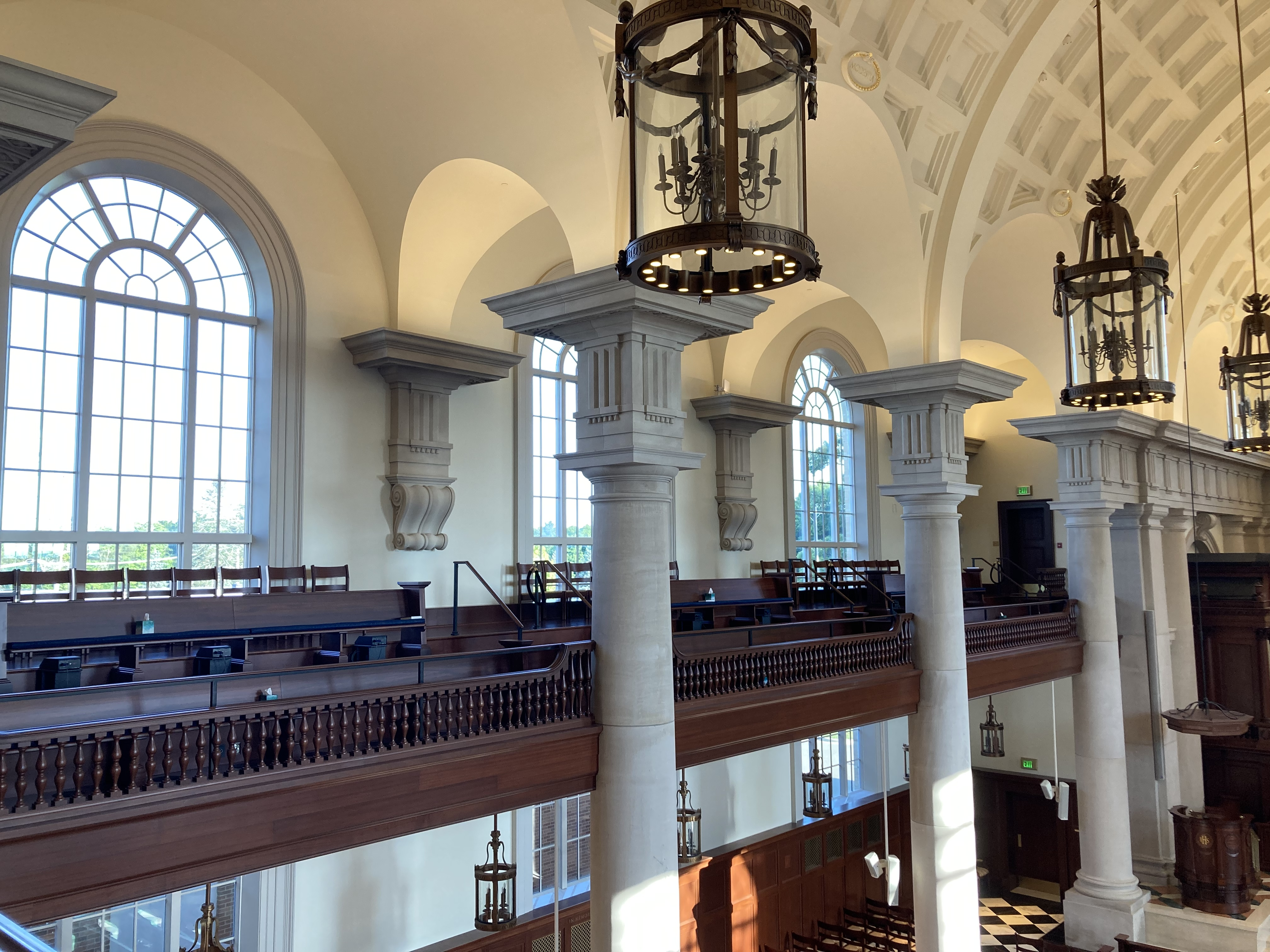
Galleries in nave

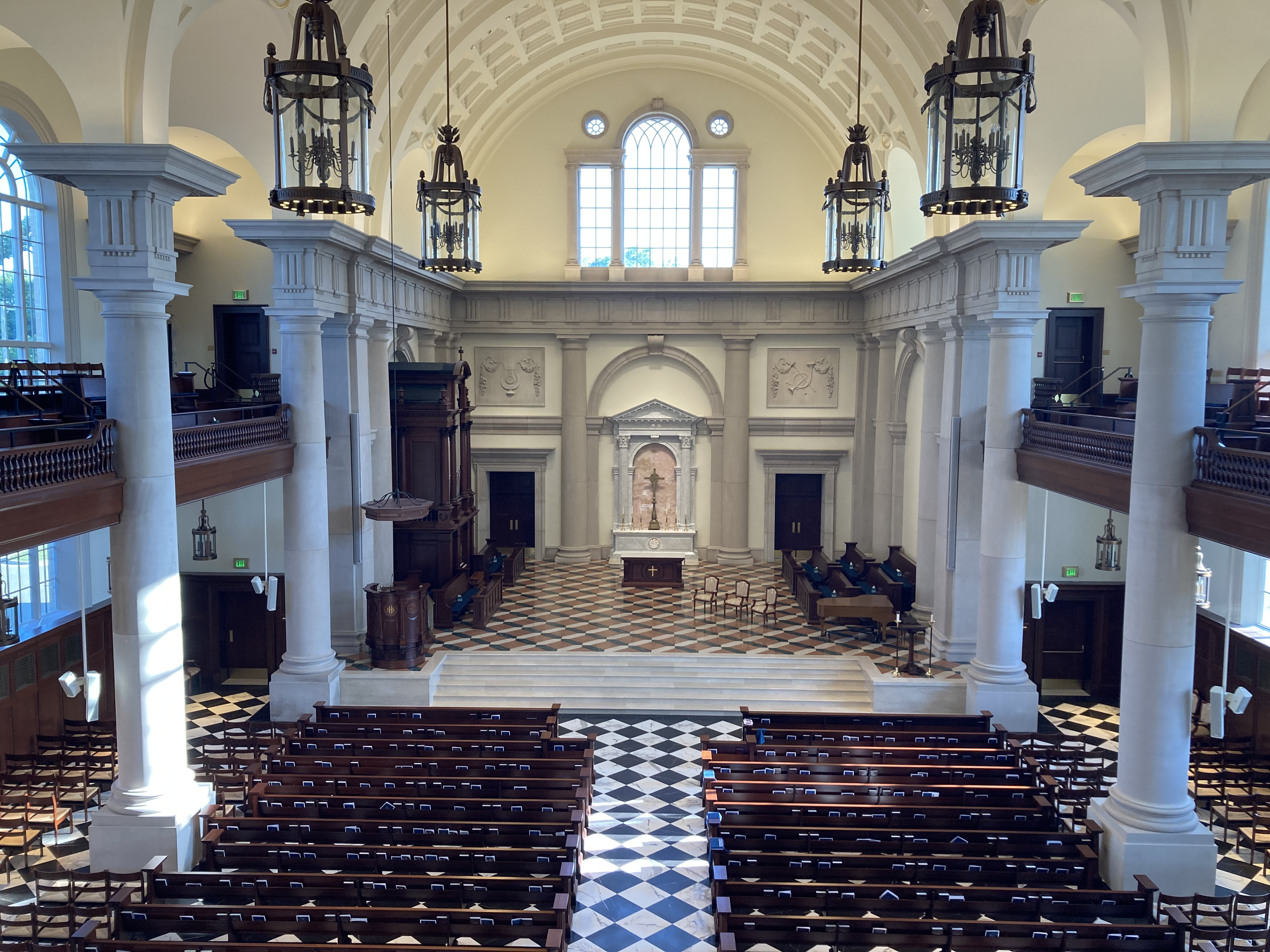
Chancel viewed from rear gallery

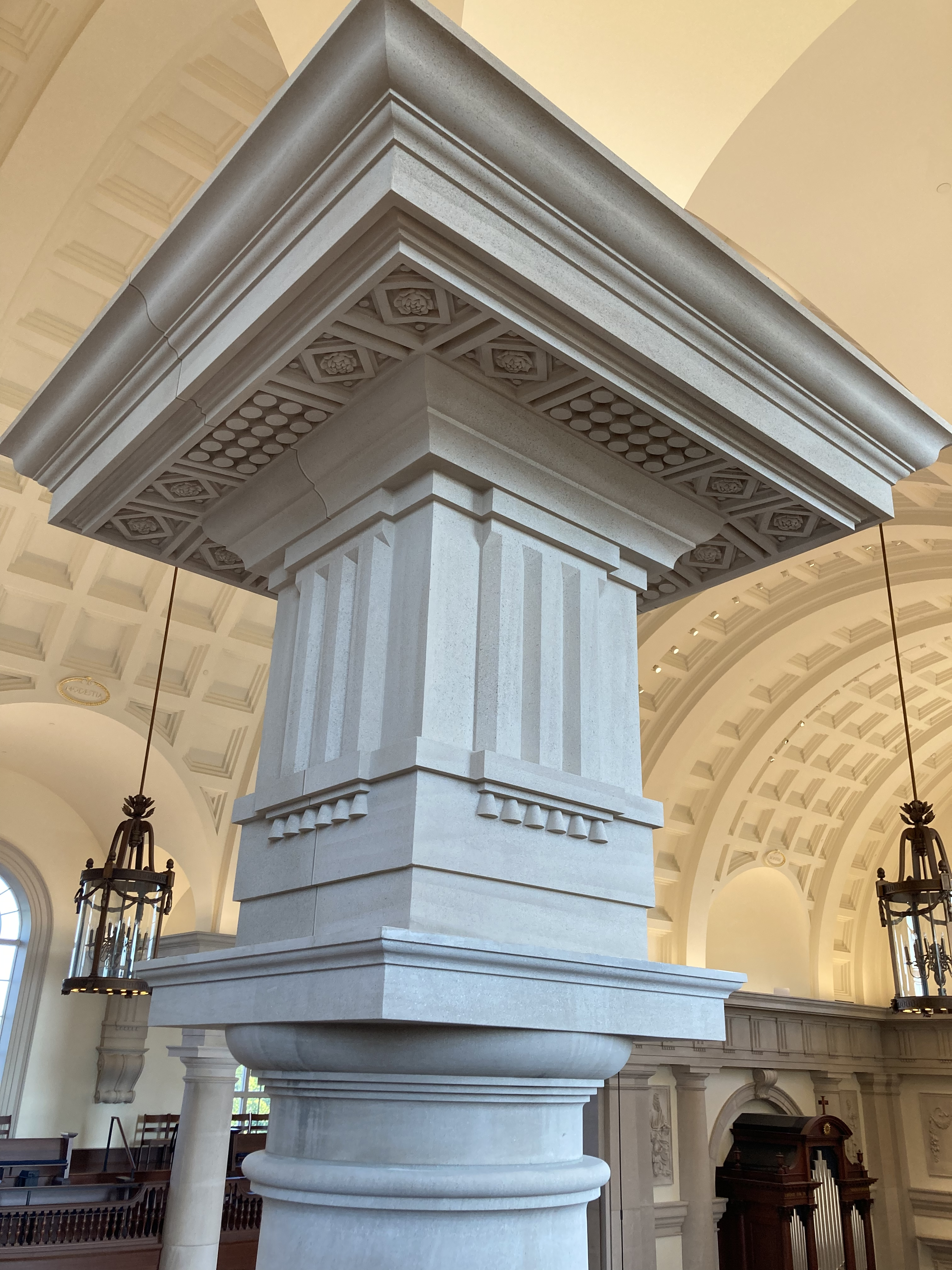
Capital detail

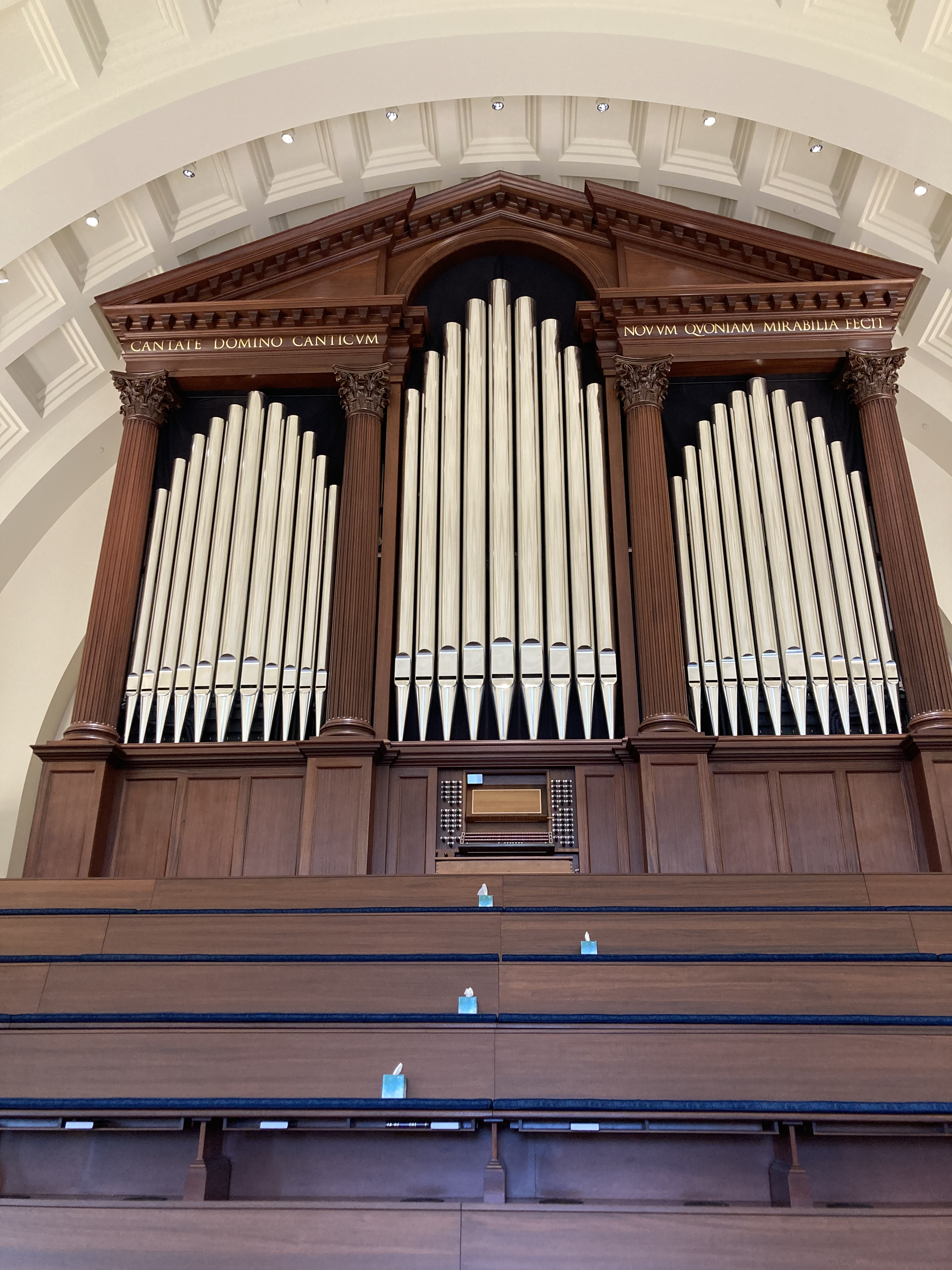
Gallery organ

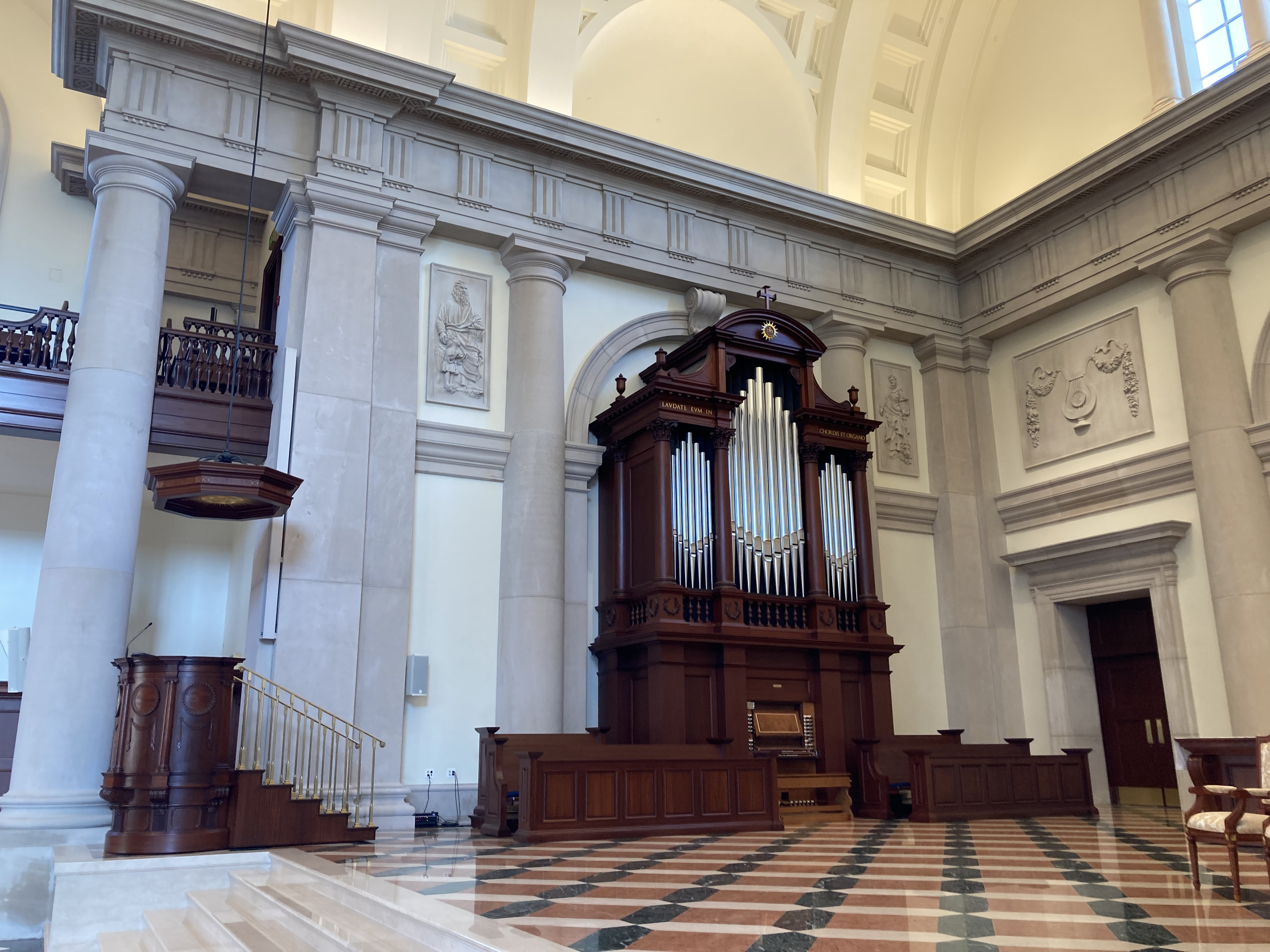
Chancel organ and pulpit

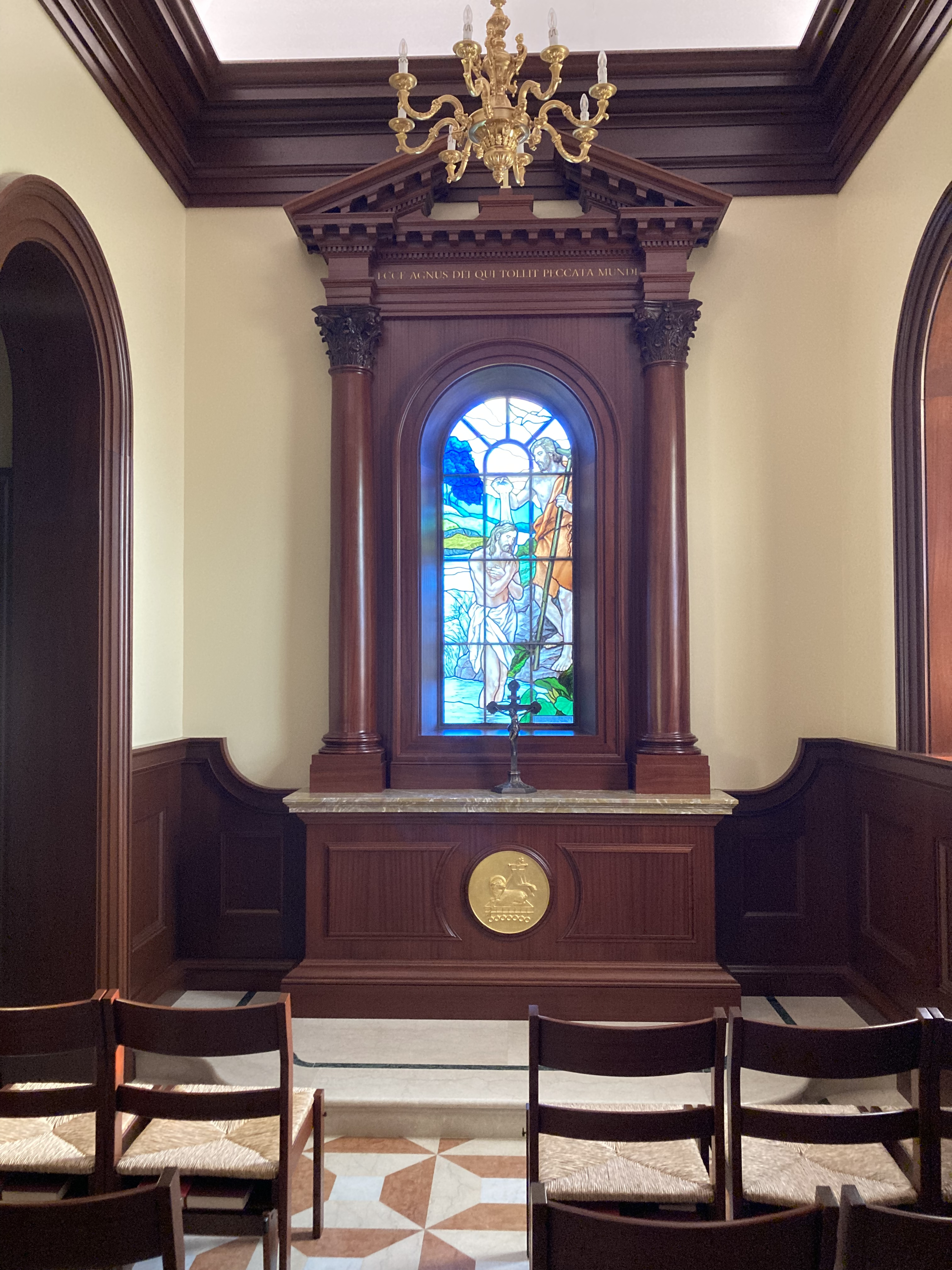
Day chapel
