= Mount Morris Township =

Mount Morris Township may refer to:

- Mount Morris Township, Ogle County, Illinois
- Mount Morris Township, Michigan
- Mount Morris Township, Morrison County, Minnesota

== See also ==
- Morris Township (disambiguation)
