= Claire Kretzschmar =

American dancer and choreographer

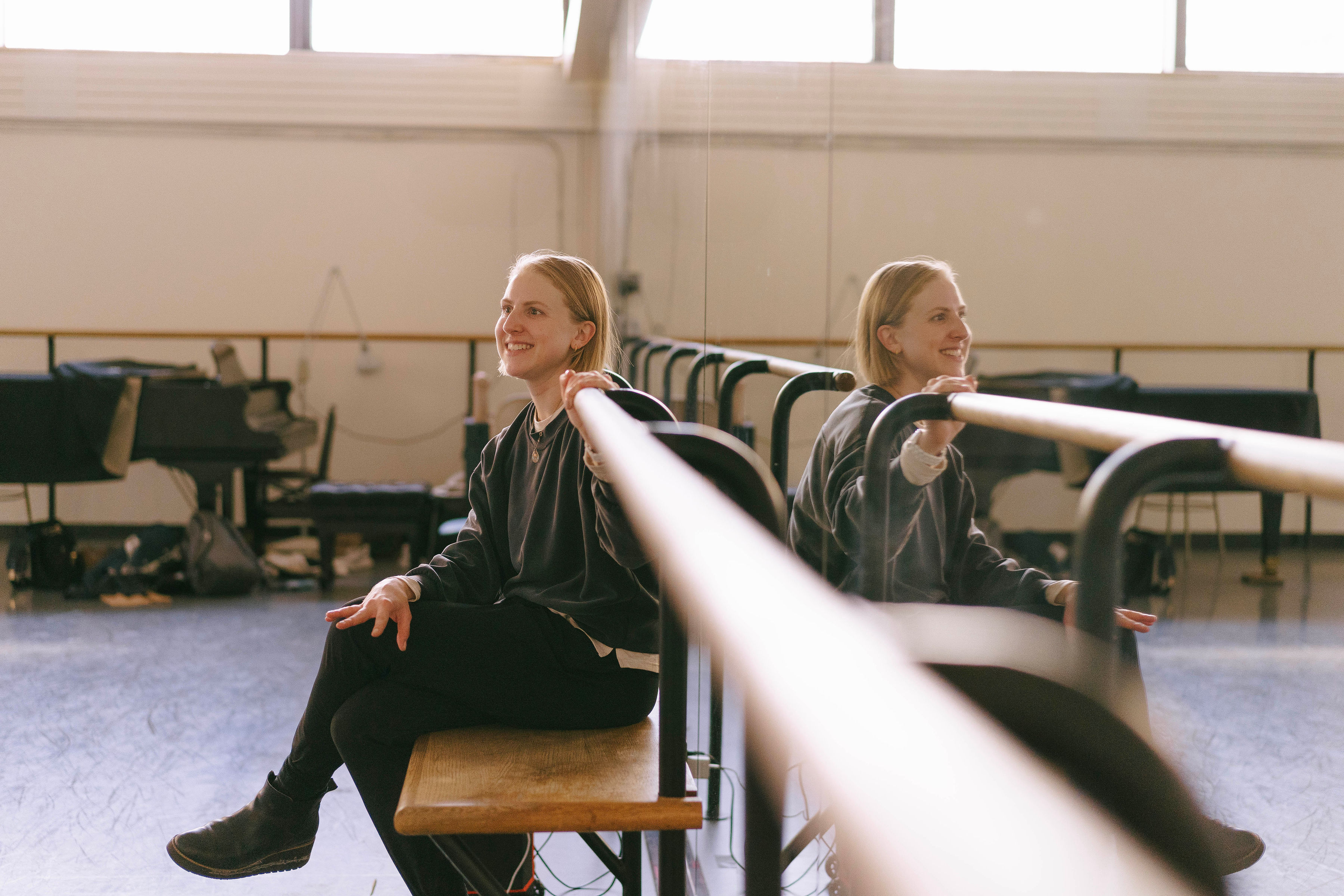
- Born: 1992 (age 33–34); Glendale, Arizona
- Education: Fordham University
- Occupations: Dancer, choreographer

Claire Kretzschmar is an American ballet dancer, choreographer, and former soloist for the New York City Ballet.

== Early life ==
Kretzschmar was born in Glendale, AZ in 1992. After moving to Winston-Salem, North Carolina, Kretzschmar began studying dance with Community Ballet at Wake Forest University. In eighth grade, she enrolled in the University of North Carolina School of the Arts.

== Career ==
At 17, Kretzschmar moved to New York City to attend the School of American Ballet at Lincoln Center, where she studied under Suki Schorer, Suzi Pillare, Kay Mazzo, Peter Martins, Sean Lavery, and Andrei Kramarevsky. In 2010, she joined the New York City Ballet as an apprentice. In 2011, Kretzschmar was promoted into the corps de ballet. In 2018, Kretzschmar made her soloist debut in George Balanchine's Stravinsky Violin Concerto. She has also performed in ballets choreographed by Jerome Robbins, Justin Peck, Kyle Abraham and Alexei Ratmansky.

Kretzschmar holds a bachelor's degree in Communications from Fordham University. She is currently the artistic director of Ballet Hartford and co-hosts the New York City Ballet podcast "The Rosin Box". She is a co-founder of Arthouse2B. In October 2022, Kretzschmar retired from the New York City Ballet.

In 2020, Kretzschmar choreographed Rachmaninoff Variations set to Rachmaninoff's music, "Variations on a Theme of Chopin" for the New York Choreographic Institute. In 2022, she choreographed Rhapsodie set to commissioned music by Lauren Vandervelden. For Ballet Hartford, she choreographed A Ceremony of Carols in 2023, with music of the same title by Benjamin Britten, and Venus in 2024, with music from Gustav Holst's "The Planets".

In 2024, Kretzschmar choreographed Raffaella, an original full-length narrative ballet that premiered at the Morris Performing Arts Center in South Bend, Indiana. A filmed live-stage recording of Raffaella was produced and premiered on October 31, 2024 at the University of Notre Dame.

=== Awards ===
- 2015 Martin E. Segal Award for rising artists
- 2017 Janice Levin Award
