= Morus =

Morus may refer to:

== People ==
- Alexander Morus (1616–1670), Franco-Scottish Protestant preacher
- Henryk Moruś (1943–2013), Polish serial killer
- Huw Morus (1622–1709), Welsh poet
- Thomas More or Morus (1478–1535), English philosopher
- Morus Clynnog (c. 1525–1581), Welsh Roman Catholic priest and recusant exile
- Morus Dwyfach (fl. c. 1523–1590), Welsh-language poet
- Morus Hasratyan (1902–1979), Armenian historian and philologist
- Moors, Mōrus in late Latin, people of the Maghreb region

== Other uses ==
- Morus (plant), a genus of trees in the family Moraceae commonly known as mulberries
- Morus (bird), a genus of seabirds in the family Sulidae commonly known as gannets
- Moros, the personified spirit of impending doom in Greek mythology
- Latin for morula, an early-stage embryo consisting of 16 cells
- Museum of Reclaimed Urban Space

== See also ==
- Moris (disambiguation)
