= Moris =

Moris may refer to:

== People ==
=== Given name ===
- Moris Carrozzieri (born 1980), Italian footballer
- Moris Farhi (born 1935), Turkish author, vice-president of International PEN
- Moris Pfeifhofer (born 1988), Swiss figure skater
- Moris (singer) (born Mauricio Birabent in 1942), Argentine guitarist
- Moris Tepper (21st century), U.S. singer, songwriter, guitarist, and painter

=== Surname ===
- Anthony Moris (born 1990), Belgian footballer
- Giuseppe Giacinto Moris (1796–1869), Italian botanist

== Places ==
- Moris Municipality, Chihuahua, Mexico
- Moris, Chihuahua, Mexican town
- Moris, island of Mauritius in the local language (creole)

== Other ==
- Arte Moris, fine arts school in East Timor.

== See also ==
- Morris (disambiguation)
- Morus (disambiguation)
- Mori (disambiguation)
