= Morris Township =

Morris Township may refer to:

== Canada ==
- Morris Township, Ontario, now part of the municipality of Morris-Turnberry

== United States ==
- Morris Township, Arkansas County, Arkansas in Arkansas County
- Morris Township, Grundy County, Illinois
- Morris Township, Sumner County, Kansas in Sumner County
- Morris Township, Stevens County, Minnesota
- Morris Township, New Jersey
- Morris township, Ramsey County, North Dakota in Ramsey County
- Morris Township, Knox County, Ohio
- Morris Township, Okmulgee County, Oklahoma, part of which is the city of Morris
- Morris Township, Clearfield County, Pennsylvania
- Morris Township, Greene County, Pennsylvania
- Morris Township, Huntingdon County, Pennsylvania
- Morris Township, Tioga County, Pennsylvania
- Morris Township, Washington County, Pennsylvania

== See also ==
- Morris (disambiguation)
- Mount Morris Township (disambiguation)
