= Morris family =

Morris family may refer to:

- Morris family of Morrisania and New Jersey
- Morris family of Illinois and Ohio
- Morris family of Pennsylvania and New York
- Morris family of Ohio
- One of the 14 merchant families known as the Tribes of Galway, Ireland
