= USS Morristown =

Cargo ship of the United States Navy

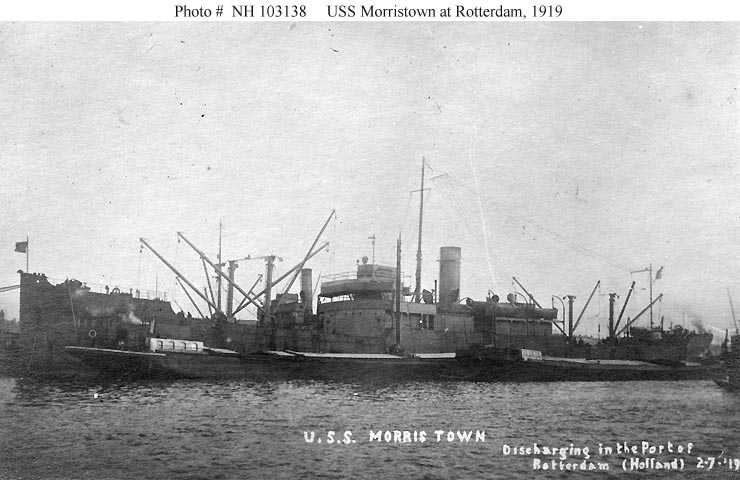
- USS Morristown (ID-3580) discharging cargo at Rotterdam, the Netherlands, on 7 February 1919

History

United States
- Name: USS Morristown
- Namesake: Morristown, New Jersey, the site of George Washington’s winter headquarters in 1776‑1777 and 1779‑1780 (previous name retained)
- Builder: Standard Shipbuilding Company, Shooters Island, New York
- Launched: 4 July 1918
- Completed: 1918
- Acquired: 18 October 1918
- Commissioned: 18 October 1918
- Decommissioned: 13 June 1919
- Fate: Transferred to United States Shipping Board 1919; Sold for scrap 4 January 1936
- Notes: Built SS Morristown in 1918; in United States Shipping Board custody as SS Morristown 1919-1936.

General characteristics
- Type: Cargo ship
- Tonnage: 5,139 Gross register tons
- Displacement: 10,562 tons
- Length: 392 ft 0 in (119.48 m)
- Beam: 52 ft 0 in (15.85 m)
- Draft: 23 ft 8 in (7.21 m)
- Speed: 9.5 knots
- Complement: 70
- Armament: 1 × 4-inch {102-millimeter) gun; 1 × 3-inch (76.2-millimeter) gun

USS Morristown (ID-3580) was a cargo ship that served in the United States Navy during World War I, from 1918 to 1919.

The cargo ship SS Morristown was built by the Standard Shipbuilding Company, Shooters Island, New York, in 1918. The U.S. Navy acquired her for World War I service from the Russian Volunteer Fleet on 18 October 1918 at Hoboken, New Jersey, assigned her the Identification Number (Id. No.) 3580, and commissioned her the same day.

Assigned to the Naval Overseas Transportation Service (NOTS), Morristown sailed from New York City on 27 October 1918 in convoy for Europe, arriving at La Pallice, France, on 15 November 1918 to debark her cargo of United States Army supplies and airplanes. She made two more runs to European ports with ammunition and general cargo before departing Dartmouth, England, for the United States East Coast on 25 May 1919.

Arriving at Norfolk, Virginia, on 9 June 1919, Morristown decommissioned on 13 June 1919 and was delivered to the United States Shipping Board (USSB). She remained in USSB custody as SS Morristown until sold for scrap on 4 January 1936.
