= Morris High School =

Morris High School may refer to several high schools in the United States:

- Mark Morris High School, Longview, Washington
- Morris Area High School, Morris, Minnesota
- Morris Catholic High School, Denville, New Jersey
- Morris Central School, Morris, New York
- Morris High School (Illinois), Morris, Illinois
- Morris High School (Oklahoma), Morris, Oklahoma
- Morris High School (Bronx), Bronx, New York
- Morris High School (Morris, Minnesota), listed on the NRHP in Minnesota
- Morris Hills High School, Rockaway, New Jersey
- Morris Knolls High School, Rockaway, New Jersey
- Mount Morris Junior/Senior High School, Mount Morris, New York
- West Morris Central High School, Chester, New Jersey
- West Morris Mendham High School, Mendham Borough, New Jersey

== See also ==
- Morris High School Historic District, Bronx, New York
