= Morris Museum (disambiguation) =

The Morris Museum is a museum in Morristown, New Jersey.

Morris Museum may also refer to:

- Morris Museum of Art, Augusta, Georgia established in 1985
- Morris Graves Museum of Art, Eureka, California named after Morris Graves
- Morris Motors Museum, in Long Hanborough, West Oxfordshire, England
