= Mount Morris =

Mount Morris may refer to:

== Places ==
=== United States ===
- Mount Morris, Illinois
- Mount Morris, Michigan
- Mount Morris (New York), a mountain
- Mount Morris (town), New York
  - Mount Morris (village), New York
- Mount Morris, Pennsylvania
- Mount Morris, Wisconsin, a town
- Mount Morris (community), Wisconsin, an unincorporated community
- Mount Morris Township, Ogle County, Illinois
- Mount Morris Township, Michigan
- Mount Morris Township, Minnesota

=== Other places ===
- Mount Morris (Antarctica)

== People ==
- Mount Etna Morris (1900-1988), U.S. politician

== Other ==
- Mount Morris College, Illinois
- Mount Morris Dam, New York
- Mount Morris Park Historic District, Harlem, New York city
