= Morris, West Virginia =

Unincorporated community in West Virginia, US

Coordinates: 38°30′21″N 80°48′09″W

Morris is an unincorporated community in Nicholas County, in the U.S. state of West Virginia.

== History ==
A post office called Morris was established in 1911, and remained in operation until 1964. The community was named after a local family.
