= Lord Morris =

Lord Morris is the name of:

- Lord Morris of Aberavon
- Lord Morris of Manchester
- Lord Morris of Handsworth
- Lord Morris of Castle Morris
- Baron Morris, various titles
- Bill Morris, Baron Morris of Handsworth (born 1938), former British trade union leader
- Brian Morris, Baron Morris of Castle Morris (1930–2001), British poet, critic and professor of literature, and politician
- Charles Morris, Baron Morris of Grasmere (1898–1990)
- Edward Morris, 1st Baron Morris (1859–1935)
- John Morris, Baron Morris of Borth-y-Gest (1930-2001), English judge
- John Morris, Baron Morris of Aberavon (born 1931), British retired politician
- Harry Morris, 1st Baron Morris of Kenwood (1893–1954), British politician
- Michael Morris, Baron Morris, also 1st Baron Killanin (1826–1901), Lord Chief Justice of the King's Bench for Ireland and Lord of Appeal in Ordinary
- Martin Morris, 2nd Baron Killanin (1867–1927)
- Michael Morris, 3rd Baron Killanin (1914–1999)
- Redmond Morris, 4th Baron Killanin (born 1947)
- William Morris, 1st Viscount Nuffield (1877–1963), English motor manufacturer and philanthropist, founder of Morris Motors Limited
