= Morris, Kanawha County, West Virginia =

Morris, West Virginia
- Ghost town
- Location within West Virginia and the United States Morris (the United States)
- Coordinates: 38°21′48″N 81°50′33″W
- Country: United States
- State: West Virginia
- County: Kanawha
- Elevation: 718 ft (219 m)
- Time zone: UTC-5 (Eastern (EST))
  - Summer (DST): UTC-4 (EDT)
- GNIS ID: 1742232

Morris is an extinct town in Kanawha County, West Virginia.
