= Morristown =

Morristown may refer to:

== Places ==
=== Canada ===
- Morristown, Kings County, Nova Scotia
- Morristown, Antigonish County, Nova Scotia

=== United States ===
- Morristown, Arizona
- Morristown, Indiana
  - Morristown station (Indiana)
- Morristown, Minnesota
  - Morristown Township, Rice County, Minnesota
- Morristown, New Jersey, in Morris County
  - Morristown District
  - Morristown Municipal Airport
  - Morristown National Historical Park
  - Morristown station
- Morristown, Middlesex County, New Jersey
- Morristown (town), New York
  - Morristown (village), New York
- Morristown, Ohio
  - Morristown Historic District
- Morristown, South Dakota
- Morristown, Tennessee
  - Morristown Regional Airport
- Morristown, Vermont
- Morristown, West Virginia

== Other uses ==
- Morristown, Pennsylvania, a fictional city in Brockmire
- USS Morristown (ID-3580), a United States Navy cargo ship 1918–1919

== See also ==
- Battle of Morristown, in Tennessee, 1864
- Morice Town, a suburb of Plymouth in Devon, England
- Morriston, Wales
- Morriston, Florida, U.S.
