= Morrisville =

Morrisville may refer to:

- Morrisville, Bucks County, Pennsylvania, United States
- Morrisville, Greene County, Pennsylvania, United States
- Morrisville, Missouri, United States
- Morrisville, New York, United States
- Morrisville, Newfoundland and Labrador, Canada
- Morrisville, North Carolina, United States
- Morrisville, Ohio, United States
- Morrisville, Vermont, United States
- Morrisville, Virginia, United States
