= Morris Performing Arts Center =

Concert hall in South Bend, Indiana

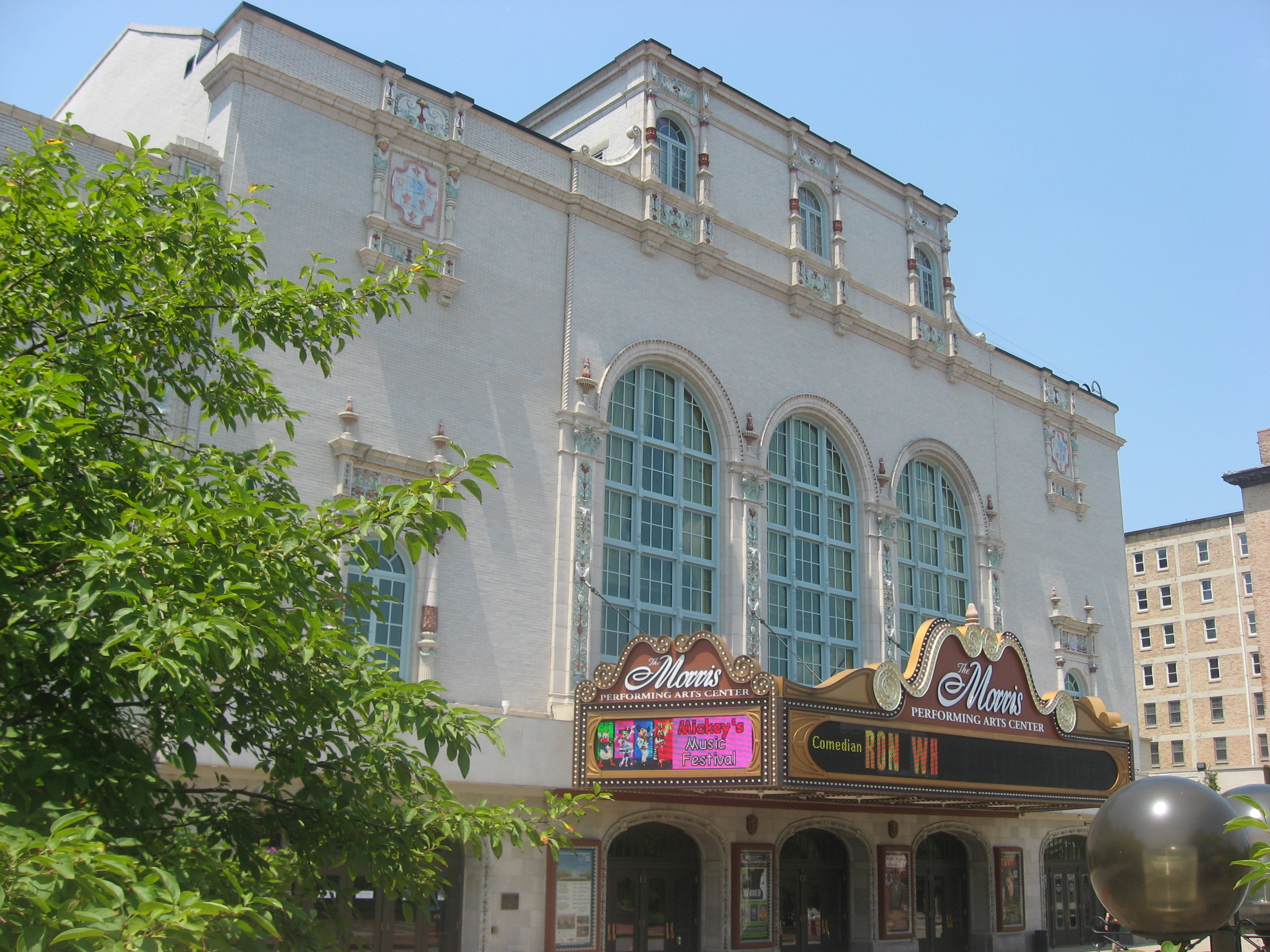
- Front of the center
- Interactive map of Morris Performing Arts Center
- Former names: Palace Theatre; Morris Civic Auditorium
- Address: 211 N. Michigan St. South Bend, Indiana; United States
- Owner: City of South Bend
- Operator: Morris Entertainment, Inc.
- Capacity: 2,564
- Type: Vaudeville house
- Current use: Performing arts center

Construction
- Opened: 1922
- Reopened: March 3, 2000

Website
- www.morriscenter.org
- Palace Theatre
- U.S. National Register of Historic Places
- Location within Indiana Location within the United States
- Coordinates: 41°40′42″N 86°15′2″W
- Area: Less than 1 acre (0.40 ha)
- Architect: J.S. Aroner; Ralph Sollitt Co.
- Architectural style: Spanish Renaissance Revival
- MPS: Downtown South Bend Historic MRA
- NRHP reference No.: 85001226
- Added to NRHP: June 5, 1985

Morris Performing Arts Center (originally Palace Theatre and formerly Morris Civic Auditorium) is a 2,564-seat concert hall located in South Bend, Indiana. It opened in 1922 as a vaudeville house and later became a movie palace. It was developed along with the neighboring Palais Royale Building by the Palace Theater Corporation. It is a four- to five-story, rectangular, Spanish Renaissance Revival style brick building with finely crafted terra cotta ornamentation. It was planned for demolition in 1959 but was saved from demolition, and between 1998 and 2000, it was restored and remodeled.

Morris Performing Arts Center's interior has a rose, blue and cream color scheme, as when it opened. The theater stage measures 56 feet by 57 feet and contains a red and gold main curtain dating from the 2000 restoration. The theater is home to the South Bend Symphony Orchestra and hosts Broadway shows, concerts, and other special events, including Marian High School's annual commencement ceremony. The theater's interior borrowed from European architectural styles. More than half of the seats at the center, 1,282, are in the balcony, with the remainder in the lower level.

In 1985, the center was listed on the National Register of Historic Places. It qualified for historic designation because of its place in the region's history and because of its historically significant architecture.

In 2022, the theater celebrated its 100th year, and on November 2 of that year, a documentary commemorating the anniversary aired on the local PBS affiliate, WNIT-TV.

The Raclin Murphy Encore Center addition opened in 2026.
