= Mara (name) =

Mara can be either a surname or a (usually female) first name. Mara is Irish for ocean.

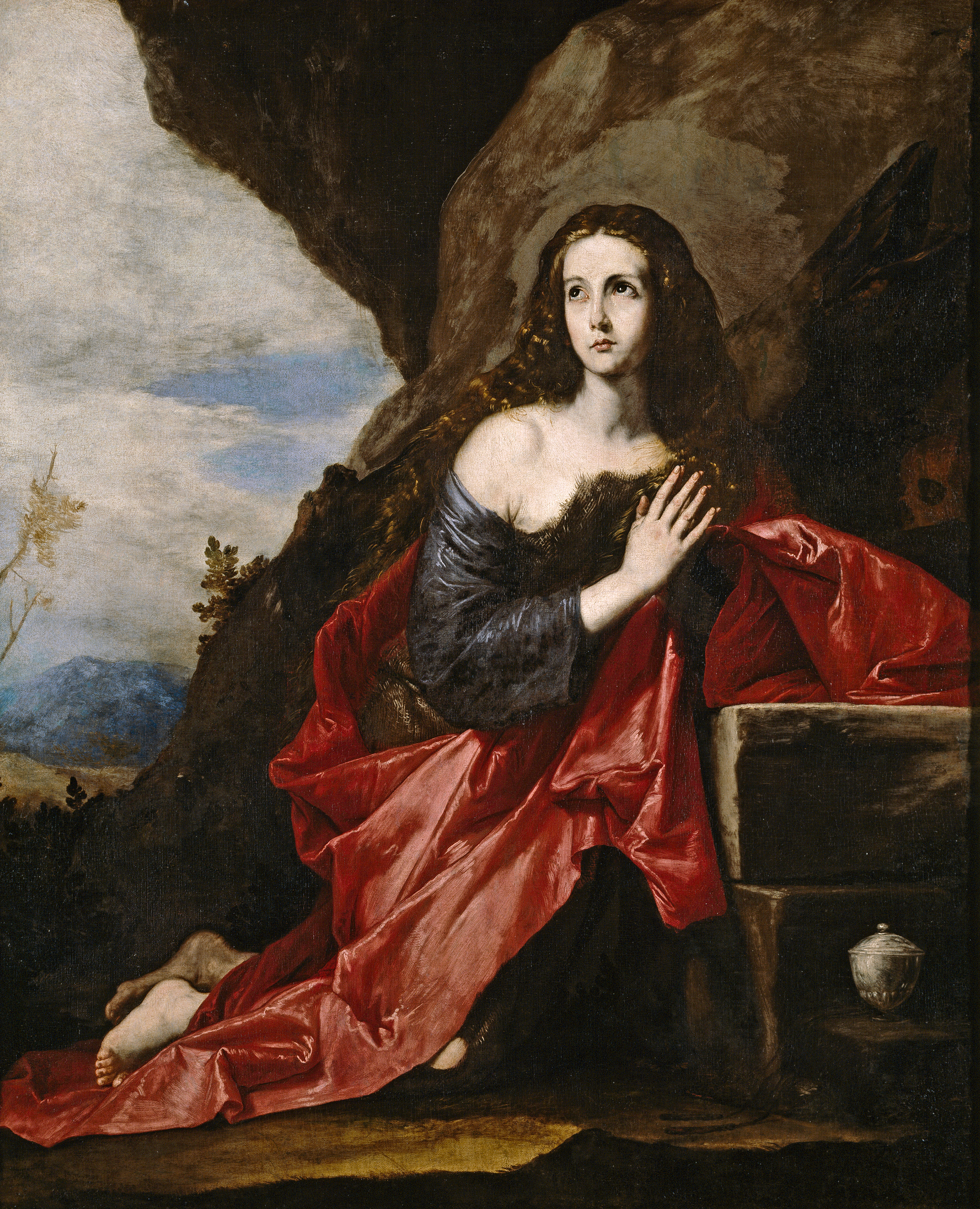
Mary Magdalene by José de Ribera (1641)

As a surname, it may be:

- Hungarian: from a pet form of the personal names Mária, Márkus (Hungarian form of Marcus or Mark) or Márton (Hungarian form of Martin), or from a short form of the old ecclesiastical name Marcel;
- Irish: a shortened form of O’Mara;
- Czech (Mára): from a pet form of the personal name Marek or Martin.

Mara as a female first name is pronounced MAHR-ah most of the time, but can be pronounced as rhyming with Sarah in Jewish-American and Southern United States culture. It is of Hebrew origin, and the meaning of Mara carries the implication "strength." The biblical Naomi, mother-in-law of Ruth, claimed the name Mara (מרא) as an expression of grief after the deaths of her husband and sons. It also means "Lady" in Aramaic, because Mar means "Lord", and is a title of bishops in the Syriac Christian church. It is also the name of a bitter lake in the Bible, and a title of the Kabbalistic sephira Binah.

The name may also be a Spanish, Italian, Portuguese, Greek or East European variant of Mary, Marianna, Maria, Marzanna and as a short form of Tamara. It is a variant of Maura, an Anglicization of the Irish name Máire, the Irish name of Mary, or the Scottish name Moira. It can also be a feminine version of Mauro, meaning a dark-skinned person. In Hindu, and Southeast Asian Buddhist cultures, it is etymologically related to the Sanskrit terms Mala (rosary), Mallika (jasmine) or Mayura (peacock) and is a unisex name or a surname, etymologically unrelated to anything demonic in Sino-Tibetan and modern Indic languages because the letters R and L are sometimes conflated (cf. in Japanese). It is a popular name in Latin America and the United States, for it has been in the top 1000 in the United States since 1950.

== People with the surname ==
- Aday Mara (born 2005), Spanish basketball player
- Adele Mara (1923–2010), American actress
- Alehana Mara (born 1989), New Zealand rugby league footballer
- Audrey Crespo-Mara (born 1976), French journalist and television presenter
- Bob Mara (1940–2014), Australian rugby league footballer
- Bogdan Mara (born 1977), Romanian footballer
- Celia Mara (born 1961), Brazilian singer-songwriter and producer
- David Mara (or Mari; born 1995), Australian bobsledder
- Dan Mara (born c. 1955), American college basketball coach
- Finau Mara (born 1960), Fijian lawyer, politician, and diplomat
- Gary Mara (1962–2012), Australian rugby league footballer; son of Bob
- George Mara (1921–2006), Canadian businessman and Olympian hockey player
- Gertrud Elisabeth Mara (1749–1833), German operatic soprano
- Hubert Mara (born 1975), Austrian professor for computer science and digital archaeology
- Ignác František Mara (1709–1783), Bohemian cellist and composer
- Jack Mara (1908–1965), American co-owner of the New York Giants
- Jason O'Mara (born 1972), Irish-American actor
- John Mara (born 1954), American New York Giants executive
- John Andrew Mara (1840–1920), Canadian politician, rancher and merchant
- Sir Kamisese Mara (1920–2004), Fijian politician
- Kate Mara (born 1983), American actress
- Lala Mara (1931–2004), Fijian chief
- Lollie Mara (1939–2025), Filipino actress
- Lya Mara (1897–1960), German actress of the silent era
- Mary Mara (1960–2022), American TV and film actress
- Michele Mara (1903–1983), Italian cyclist
- Mohamed Mara (born 1996), Guinean international footballer
- Moussa Mara (born 1975), Malian politician and Prime Minister of Mali from 2014 to 2015
- Nick Mara (born 1997), American singer of boy band Prettymuch
- Patrick Mara (born 1975), American elected member of the District of Columbia Board of Education
- Paul Mara (born 1979), American ice hockey player
- Peter Mara (born 1947), Canadian ice hockey player
- P. J. Mara (1942–2016), Irish public affairs consultant
- Peter O'Mara (born 1957), Australian-born jazz guitarist, composer and teacher
- Rebecca O'Mara (born 1977), Irish actress
- Rooney Mara (born 1985), American actress
- Sékou Mara (born 2002), French footballer
- Sri Mara (137–192 AD), Chinese founder of the kingdom of Champa
- Tânia Mara (born 1983), Brazilian singer and actress
- Tevita Mara (fl. 1980s–2010s), Fijian career soldier
- Thalia Mara (1911–2003), American ballet dancer and educator
- Tim Mara (1887–1959), American New York Giants executive
- Timothy J. Mara (1935–1995), American businessman and part owner of the New York Giants football team
- Uerdi Mara (born 1999), Albanian footballer
- Václav Mára (born 1943), Czechoslovak sprint canoer
- Wellington Mara (1916–2005), American New York Giants executive
- Ann Mara (1929–2015), American businesswoman, philanthropist, wife and widow of Wellington Mara
- Wil Mara (born 1966), American writer and novelist

== People with the given name ==
- Mara Abbott (born 1985), American cyclist
- Mara Bar-Serapion, 1st-century Syriac writer
- Mara Bergman (fl. 1980s–2010s), American author
- Mara Bizzotto (born 1972), Italian politician
- Mara Branković (1420–1487), medieval Serbian royal
- Mara Brock Akil (born 1970), American television producer
- Mara Brunetti (born 1976), Italian swimmer
- Mara Buneva (1902–1928), Bulgarian revolutionary
- Mara Carfagna (born 1975), Italian politician
- Mara Carlyle (born 1974/75), English singer-songwriter
- Mara Corday (1930–2025), American model
- Mara Croatto (born 1969), Puerto Rican actress
- Mara Darmousli (born 1981), Greek fashion model
- Mara Galeazzi (born 1973), Italian ballet dancer
- Mara Hvistendahl, American Pulitzer Prize-winning journalist for Seed magazine
- Mara Liasson (born 1955), American political correspondent
- Mara Lopez (born 1991), Filipina surfer
- Mara Mareș (born 1992), Romanian politician
- Mara Matočec (1885–1967), Croatian folk writer and peasant activist
- Mara Navarria, Italian fencer
- Mara Prada (fl. 2010s), Columbia singer on "Crazy Love" with Beto Pérez
- Mara Rosolen (born 1965), Italian shot putter
- Mara Santangelo (born 1981), Italian tennis player
- Mara Sapon-Shevin, American professor of inclusive education
- Mara Sattei (born 1995), Italian singer-songwriter
- Mara Schiavocampo (born 1979), American journalist
- Mara Schnittka (born 1995), known professionally as Julia Montes, Filipino actress of German descent
- Mara Švel-Gamiršek (born 1900–1975), Croatian writer
- Mara Topić (born 1994), Ecuadorian beauty pageant titleholder
- Mara Torres (born 1974), Spanish journalist
- Mara Wilson (born 1987), American actress and writer

=== Fictional characters ===
- Mara, the main character of the animated TV series called Adventures in Shaygonia by Candvanni Studios
- Marller ("Mara"), a demon in the manga and anime series Oh My Goddess!
- Mara Jade, in the Star Wars Expanded Universe
- Mara Davis/Mara David/Mara del Valle, in the Filipino soap opera Mara Clara (1992) and Mara Clara (2010)
- Mara Aramov, the antagonist of the Syphon Filter video game series
- Mara Jaffray, in TV series House of Anubis
- Mara Lady of the Acoma, in the Empire Trilogy novels by Raymond E. Feist and Janny Wurts
- Mara, the mother-goddess in the pantheon of The Elder Scrolls
- Mara Silang, a character from Philippine drama series FPJ's Ang Probinsyano
- Mara Sov, the queen of the awoken people in Destiny 1 and 2
- Mara, a past She-Ra from DreamWorks' TV series She-Ra and the Princesses of Power
- Mara Amaratayakul, main character of the Thai television anthology series Girl from Nowhere
- Mara, an old and wise romani woman in the book Mond, Mond, Mond by Ursula Wölfel
- Mara, character from Shimmer and Shine
- Mara Heussaff, character from Zara Fan Account musical, Paris premiere
- Mara Dyer, protagonist in the Mara Dyer Trilogy novels by Michelle Hodkin
- Mara, a deity that is featured in the Disneyland attraction Indiana Jones Adventure
- Mara Forest, the main character of the survival horror video game Crow Country

== Nicknames ==
- Nickname of Martti Ahtisaari, a career diplomat and former President of Finland
- Nickname for Maria in Bulgarian, Croatian, Hungarian and Serbian
- Nickname for Dagmar in Scandinavian languages and Czech
- Nickname for Martin or Martina in Hungarian
- Nickname for Tamara
- Nickname for Meredith when pronounced like Meh-ra
- Nickname for Maranatha in Evangelical Christian culture
- Nickname for Maria, Marianna, et al. in Russian and other Slavic languages
- Nickname for such names as Marcel, Markus or Martin
- Naomi (Bible), self-named Mara, meaning "bitterness", after she suffered the deaths of her husband and her two sons
- Stage name for Faith Coloccia during her solo performances

== See also ==
- Māra (given name)
- Mara (disambiguation)
- Maura (disambiguation)
- Máire
- Marah (disambiguation)
- Moira (given name)
- Maria (disambiguation)
