= Mauro (given name) =

Mauro is an Italian, Spanish, and Portuguese given name literally meaning "black". Its feminine form is Maura. It may refer to:

- Mauro (footballer, born 1932), Brazilian footballer
- Mauro Silva (footballer, born 1978), Brazilian footballer
- Mauro (footballer, born 1984), Portuguese footballer
- Mauro (footballer, born 1990), Brazilian footballer
- Mauro Agostini (born 1989), Argentine cyclist
- Fra Mauro (15th century), Venetian monk and mapmaker
- Mauro Barella (born 1956), Italian pole vaulter
- Mauro Blanco (born 1965), Bolivian footballer
- Mauro Camoranesi (born 1976), Italian football manager and former player
- Mauro Caviezel (born 1988), Swiss alpine skier
- Mauro Cid (born 1979), Brazilian military
- Mauro Di Francesco (1951–2025), Italian actor, comedian and television personality
- Mauro Díaz (born 1991), Argentine footballer
- Mauro Esposito (born 1979), Italian footballer
- Mauro Eustáquio (born 1993), Canadian soccer player
- Mauro Giuliani (1781–1829), Italian guitarist and composer
- Mauro Hamza (born 1965 or 1966), Egyptian fencing coach
- Mauro Icardi (born 1993), Argentine footballer
- Mauro Michielsen (born 2005), Belgian politician
- Mauro Pagani (born 1946), Italian musician
- Mauro Pawlowski (born 1971), Belgian musician
- Mauro Prosperi (born 1955), Italian police officer and pentathlete
- Mauro Martini Raccasi (born 1959), Italian writer
- Mauro Ramos (1930–2002), Brazilian footballer
- Mauro Ranallo (born 1969), Canadian sports announcer
- Mauro Rosales (born 1981), Argentine footballer
- Mauro Scoccimarro (1895–1972), Italian economist and politician
- Mauro Scocco (born 1962), Swedish musician
- Mauro Severino (born 1999), Angolan-born Finnish fashion designer and former footballer
- Mauro Silva (born 1968), Brazilian footballer
- Mauro Vieira (born 1951), Brazilian diplomat
- Mauro Zárate (born 1987), Argentine footballer

== See also ==
- Mauro (disambiguation)
- Mauro (surname)
- San Mauro (disambiguation)
- Maura (disambiguation)
- Maurus (disambiguation)
