= Maras =

Maras or Maraş (pronounced Marash) may refer to:

== Places ==
- Kahramanmaraş, traditionally Marash, Turkey
- Maras, Iran (disambiguation)
- Maras, Peru
  - Maras District
  - Salt Mines of Maras
- Maraş, the Turkish name for the Varosha, Famagusta, Cyprus

== Other uses ==
- Maras (surname)
- Maraš, a Serbian surname
- Māras, a Latvian festival

== See also ==
- Mara (disambiguation)
- Marash (disambiguation)
