= Mara =

Mara or MARA may refer to:

== Arts and entertainment ==
=== Fictional characters ===
- Mara (Doctor Who), an evil being in two Doctor Who serials
- Mara (She-Ra), fictional characters from the She-Ra and the Princesses of Power and The New Adventures of He-Man animated series
- Mara Davis/Mara David/Mara del Valle, a character from Philippine drama series Mara Clara (1992 TV series) and Mara Clara (2010 TV series)
- Mara Jade, in the Star Wars Expanded Universe
- Mara Sewell, a fictional character in The Shield
- Mara Wade, title character of Mara of the Wilderness
- Mara Forest, main player character of Crow Country

=== Other uses in arts and entertainment ===
- Mara the Lioness, an animal actor
- Mara (album), a 1995 album by Scottish band Runrig
- Mara (film), a 2018 American supernatural horror film starring Olga Kurylenko
- Maara, a 2021 Indian film by Dhilip Kumar
- Mara, an 1894 novel by Ioan Slavici
- Dance Club Mara, a formation dance team, Minsk, Belarus

== Cultural and language groupings ==
- Mara (Tagin), a tribe in Arunachal Pradesh
- Mara language, a language spoken by the Mara people of India and Burma
  - Mara people
- Maric languages, a group of Aboriginal Australian languages also known as Mara or Maran
- Marra language, an Aboriginal Australian language (also known as Mara)
  - Marra people, an Aboriginal Australian people

== Folklore, mythology, and religion ==
- Mara (demon), in Buddhism
- Mara (folklore), a wraith-like creature in Germanic and Scandinavian folklore
- Mara, anagram of Rama, for Valmiki to chant in Hindu mythology
- Marzanna or Mara, Slavic goddess
- Māra, Latvian goddess

== Military and transport ==
- MARA (anti-tank weapon), Argentine antitank missile
- Mirage 5P Mara, upgraded Dassault Mirage 5 aircraft for the Argentine Air Force
- Shell Mara, a lake tanker operated in Lake Maracaibo by Shell Oil
- SS Mara, a lake tanker operated in Lake Maracaibo by Lago Oil and Transport Company

== Organisations ==
- Mara (gang), a form of gang in the United States, El Salvador, Honduras and Guatemala
- Mara Group, a multinational and multisectoral corporation with roots in East Africa
- Marathon Digital, an American digital asset technology firm which trades on the Nasdaq as MARA
- Majlis Amanah Rakyat (People's Trust Council), MARA, a Malaysian government agency
- Ministry of Agriculture and Rural Affairs, a Chinese central government ministry
- Migration Agents Registration Authority, the Australian regulator of migration agents
- Universiti Teknologi MARA, a public university in Malaysia

== People with the name ==
- Mara (name), list of people with this name
- Māra (given name), a Latvian given name
- Mára, the stage name for American musician Faith Coloccia during solo performances
- Mara (singer), Russian rock singer
- Mara, nom de guerre of Estreya Haim Ovadya, Yugoslavian partisan

== Places ==
Including geographical features

- Mara (torrent), a stream of Switzerland and Italy
- Mara, Aragon, a municipality in the province of Zaragoza, Aragon, Spain
- Mara, Iran, a village in Tehran province
- Mara, Isfahan, a village in Iran
- Mara, Kerman, a village in Iran
- Mara, Sardinia, a commune on the Italian island of Sardinia
- Mara, a small town in the Bushveld of South Africa
- Mara, a village in Desești Commune, Maramureș County, Romania
- Mara, a village in Tararua District, part of Wellington Region, New Zealand
- Mara District, a district in the province of Cotabambas, Apurimac, Peru
- Mara (Iza), a river in northern Romania
- Mara Lake, a lake in British Columbia, Canada
- Mara Mountain, a mountain in Greenland, and the closest mountain to the North Pole
- Mara Provincial Park (Ontario), a provincial park located near Orillia, Ontario, Canada
- Mara Provincial Park, a provincial park in British Columbia, Canada
- Mara Region, an administrative division in Tanzania
- Mara River (Nunavut), a river in Canada
- Mara River, a river of Kenya and Tanzania
- Măra River, a river in Romania
- Marado or Mara Island, South Korea
- Masai Mara, known locally as "The Mara", a reserve in Kenya near the Mara River

== Other uses ==
- Mara (mammal), a subfamily of the cavy family
- MaraDNS, DNS software
- Mandibular Anterior Repositioning Appliance, an orthodontic functional appliance

== See also ==
- Mahra (disambiguation)
- Marah (disambiguation)
- Maras (disambiguation)
- Marra (disambiguation)
- Maran (disambiguation)
