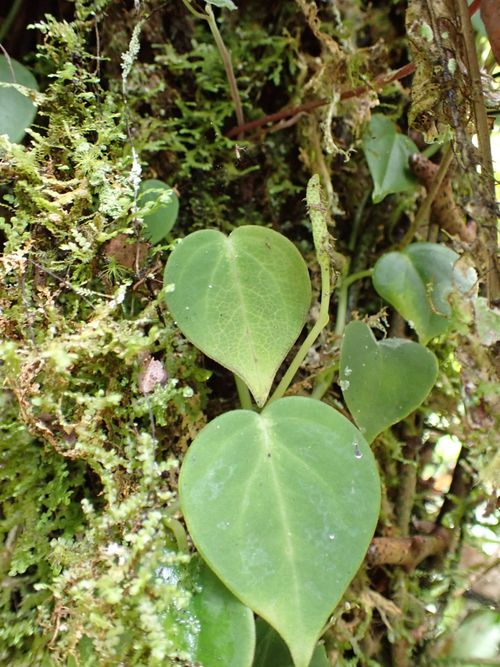

Scientific classification
- Kingdom: Plantae
- Clade: Tracheophytes
- Clade: Angiosperms
- Clade: Magnoliids
- Order: Piperales
- Family: Piperaceae
- Genus: Peperomia
- Species: P. maransara

Binomial name
- Peperomia maransara Trel.

= Peperomia maransara =

Species of plant

Peperomia maransara is a species of epiphytic herb in the genus Peperomia that is native to Peru. It grows on wet tropical biomes. Its conservation status is Threatened.

== Description ==
The type specimen were collected at Maras, Peru at an altitude of 1800 meters above sea level.

Peperomia maransara is a procumbent herb with slender stems 1–2 mm thick, bearing an obscure, appressed puberulence. The leaves are acuminate, with a rounded to somewhat truncate-cordulate base, moderately small, measuring 2.5–5 cm long and 2–3.5 cm wide. When dry, they are green and firm, with ciliate margins. They are 5-nerved and have depressed pubescence on the upper surface along the nerves when young. The glabrous petiole is 2–5 cm long. The spikes terminate puberulous branchlets 3–4 cm long, which bear a single bract near the middle. The spikes are 30 mm long and 2 mm thick, densely flowered. The brownish berries are oblong, with a setaceous beak nearly as long as the berry itself, and the stigma is anterior at the base of the beak.

== Taxonomy and naming ==
It was described in 1936 by William Trelease in Publications of the Field Museum of Natural History, Botanical Series 13, from specimens collected by Orator Fuller Cook & Grover Bruce Gilbert.

The epithet is derived from the type locality.

== Distribution and habitat ==
It is native to Peru. It grows as an epiphytic herb. It grows on wet tropical biomes.

== Conservation ==
This species is assessed as Threatened, in a preliminary report.
