= Maran (disambiguation) =

Maran is a rabbinic title.

Maran may also refer to:

- Maran (actor) (1972–2021), an Indian Tamil film actor
- Maran (surname)
- Maran, Myanmar, a village in Kachin State
- Maran, Iran (disambiguation), places in Iran
- Maran, Pahang, Malaysia
- Maran languages of Australia
- the Syriac-Christian title for Jesus; see Mar

== See also ==
- Marans (disambiguation)
- Maaran (disambiguation)
- Mara (disambiguation)
