= Marha =

Marha may refer to:

- Josef Marha (born 1976, Havlíčkův Brod), a Czech professional ice hockey player
- Māra

== See also ==
- Mahra (disambiguation)
