= Marran =

Marran may refer to:

- Marran, Iran (disambiguation), places in Iran
- Maran, Syria (Arabic: مران; also spelled Marran), a village in Aleppo Governorate, Syria
- Mohammed Maran (born 2001). Saudi Arabian footballer
- Marran Gosov (1933–2021), Bulgarian filmmaker
- Bayt Marran (Sanaa), sub-district in Sana'a, Yemen.

== See also ==
- Marra (disambiguation)
