= Mhairi =

Mhairi or Mhàiri is a Scottish female given name, ultimately derived from the name Mary. Etymologically, it is an erroneous form, based on the Scottish Gaelic vocative form a Mhàiri (pronounced [əˈvaːɾʲɪ]), from the nominative Màiri [ˈmaːɾʲɪ]. In Scottish English it is usually pronounced [ˈvaːrɪ], though it can be pronounced [ˈmaːɾʲɪ]. Variations of this form also occur, such as Mhari or Mhairie.

== Notable people with this name ==
- Mhairi-Louise Hickey, singer and songwriter
- Mhairi McKay, Scottish golfer
- Mhairi Spence, modern pentathlete
- Mhairi Black, former MP for Paisley and Renfrewshire South
- Mhairi McFarlane, novelist

== See also ==
- Mairi (disambiguation)
