= Sapon =

Sapon is a surname. Notable people with the surname include:

- Fedor Sapon (born 1993), Belarusian footballer
- Mara Sapon-Shevin, American educator
