= Mairi =

Mairi or Màiri may refer to:

== People ==
- Mairi Campbell, Scottish singer and musician
- Mairi Cameron, Australian director of music videos and films, winner of Australian Video of the Year in the 2010 J Awards
- Mairi Chisholm (1896–1981), Scottish nurse and ambulance driver in the First World War
- Mairi Gougeon (born 1985), Scottish politician
- Mairi Hedderwick (born 1939), Scottish illustrator and author
- Màiri Anna Nic Leòid (English: Mary Anne Macleod), mother of Donald Trump
- Màiri McAllan (born 1993), Scottish politician

== Places ==
- Mairi, Bahia, municipality in Brazil

== See also ==
- Máire, feminine given name
- Mhairi, variant of the given name
- Mairu, creatures of Basque mythology
