= Shevin =

Shevin is a given name and a surname. Notable people with the name include:

- Mara Sapon-Shevin (born 1951), American educator
- Robert Shevin (1934–2005), American politician
- Shevin Smith (1975–2019), American football player
