= Maraachli =

Maraachli literally coming from Marash (presently Kahramanmaraş) in Turkey, may refer to:

- Marashli Ali Pasha, an Ottoman governor, serving as the Vizier of Belgrade (Sanjak of Smederevo) in ca. 1815
- Ibrahim Maraachli, Lebanese stage, radio and television actor and comedian
- Mona Maraachli (1958-2016), Lebanese singer
- Joseph Maraachli case, an international controversy over the life of Joseph Maraachli, commonly known as Baby Joseph, a Canadian infant

== See also ==
- Marash (disambiguation)
- Kahramanmaraş
