= Maaran =

Maaran may refer to:

- Maaran (2002 film), an Indian Tamil film, starring Sathyaraj
- Maaran (2022 film), an Indian Tamil film, starring Dhanush
- Maaran (2026 film), an Indian Gujarati film, directed by Abhishek Jain
- Mani Maaran (born 1970), Tamil scholar

== See also ==
- Maran (disambiguation)
