= The Last Animal =

2023 novel by Ramona Ausubel

- First edition cover
- Author: Ramona Ausubel
- Publisher: Riverhead Books
- Publication date: April 18, 2023
- ISBN: 9780593420522

The Last Animal is a 2023 science fiction novel by Ramona Ausubel. The novel follows a newly-widowed mother and her two teenaged daughters. During a scientific expedition in Siberia, the girls stumble upon a perfectly-preserved baby wooly mammoth, and the family must choose how to move forward with this scientific discovery.

== Plot ==
The Last Animal follows sisters Vera, age 12, and Eve, age 15, as well as their newly-single mother, a year after their father died while transporting Neanderthal tissue samples. Their mother, Jane, brings the sisters to the Arctic to tag along on a scientific expedition searching for woolly mammoth remains. The team hopes that bringing back certain extinct mammals may help reverse climate change.

Bored, Vera and Eve wander away from the expedition and accidentally discover a perfectly preserved, four-thousand-year-old baby woolly mammoth. Tensions rise as other scientists try to claim the discovery, and the family opts to go rogue. Together with Jane's billionaire friend, they impregnate an elephant with genetically modified embryo using baby mammoth’s DNA.

== Reception ==
In a starred review, Kirkus Reviews noted that The Last Animal includes "an amazing amount of humor, pizazz, wisdom, and wonder" for "a story that is essentially about processing grief".

Publishers Weekly also gave the novel a starred review, referring to it as a "gem" while Booklist's Heather Booth called it "transfixing".

For Shelf Awareness, Emma Page expanded on these descriptions by writing, "The world of The Last Animal is both strikingly recognizable and yet laced with magic, a place where things Ausubel's characters can barely imagine exist just beneath the surface of everyday life".

Writing for The Washington Post, Ron Charles called The Last Animal "a sweet, poignant descendant of Jurassic Park", noting that the novel's "quirky comedy [...] constantly pushes back against the story’s abiding gloom" and "the whole book is glazed with a thin layer of absurdity".

For the Los Angeles Times, Meredith Maran wrote, "Ausubel is a supernaturally gifted writer whose heart, soul, wit and intellect are evident in every wacky setting, character and plot line she weaves. Few authors can do what she does, seemingly effortlessly". Maran concluded that potential readers should "forget everything you think you know about your reading tastes, sink into [Ausubel's] weird world and prepare to fall in love with a 4,000-year-old baby mammoth".

NPR's Jason Heller also commented on Ausubel's writing style, saying it has a "telltale zing". However, on behalf of The New York Review of Books, Regina Marler indicated that much of Ausubel's writing strengths are missing from the novel: "Only once in this novel does she deploy her stunning gift for the narrative swerve [... Her] elegant prose is skillfully stripped back in this book". Both Heller and Marler, however, discussed the larger issues the novel discusses. While Heller found the novel amusing, he also highlighted how it " tackles sexism, both personal and institutional, [...] with wryness rather than clickbait cliches".

Considering what Marler called a "headlong plot" and "the ethical issues thrumming behind the action", she also noted that "there’s a directness to Vera’s speech that can make this novel feel like children’s literature at times, spelling out what the reader has already intuited." Writing for The New York Times Book Review, Mike Peed had a similar critique, noting, "Ausubel grips her reader’s hand firmly, constantly dropping blunt reminders of her tale’s ideas and stripping them of nuance. While the family’s revelations are deeply felt, and the book’s concerns authentic, misty-eyed pronouncements run riot."

Writing for The Christian Science Monitor, Heller McAlpin highlighted how The Last Animal is filled with "outlandish albeit endearing improbabilities" and concluded that the novel "is a hairy but cuddly beast of a novel that sheds life lessons, some heartwarming, many sticky with sentiment".

Library Journal also reviewed the novel.

As announced on January 23, 2025, the book is one of three winners of the Science + Literature Awards 2025, granting Ausubel a total prize of $10,000.

== Honors ==
Kirkus Reviews named The Last Animal one of the best novels of 2023.
