= Moray (Inca ruin) =

Archaeological site in Cusco, Peru

- Muray
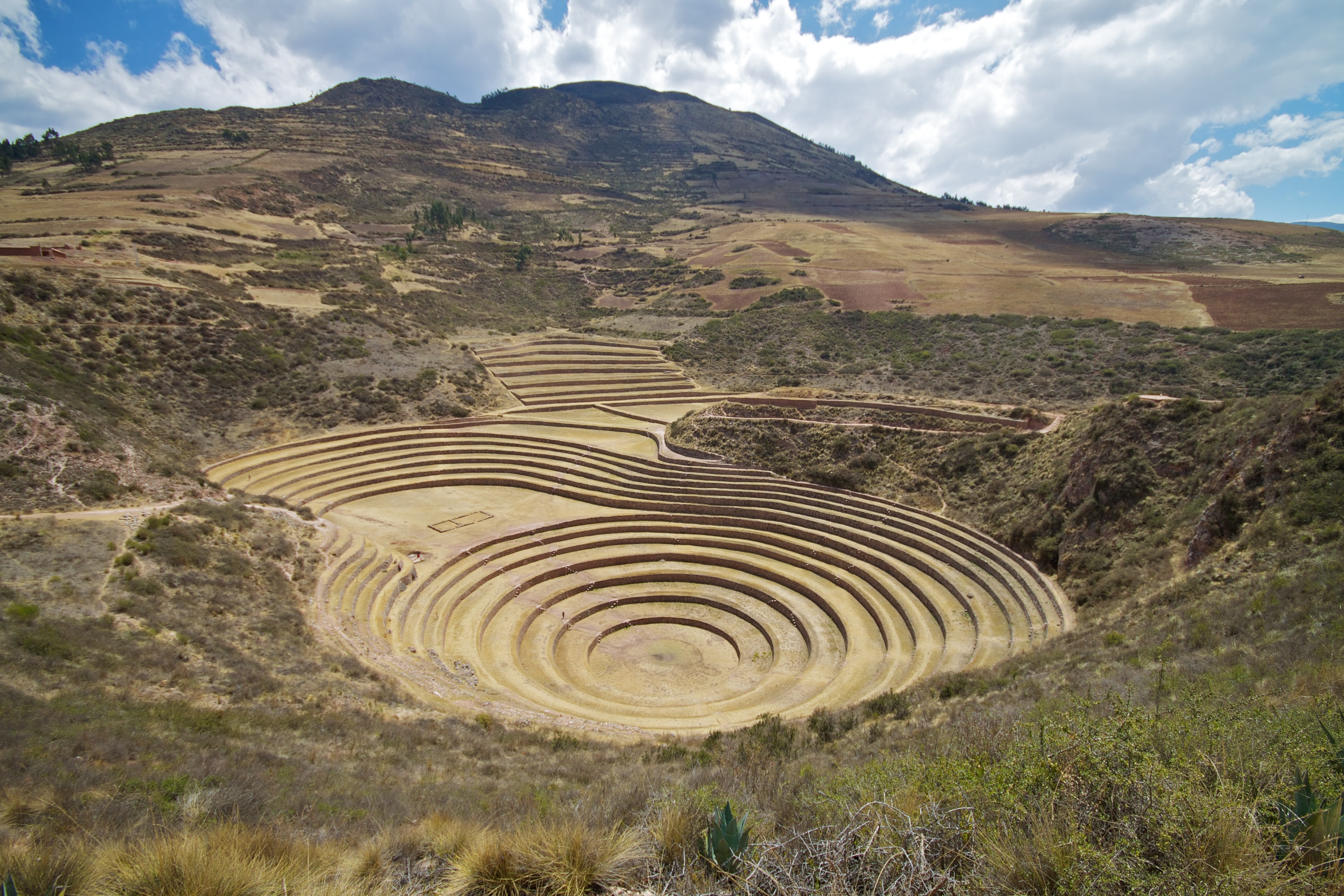
- View of the circular terraced bowl of Moray

- Location within Peru
- Interactive map of Moray
- 13°19′45″S 72°11′44″W
- Cultures: Inca
- Location: Urubamba, Cusco, Peru
- Region: Cusco Region

Site notes
- Elevation: 3,385 m (11,106 ft)
- Condition: Preserved
- Owner: Peruvian Government
- Management: Peruvian Ministry of Culture
- Public access: Yes

Moray (Quechua: Muray) is an archaeological site in Peru approximately 50 kilometres (31 mi) northwest of Cuzco on a high plateau at about 3,500 metres (11,500 ft) and just west of the village of Maras. The site contains Inca ruins, mostly consisting of several terraced circular depressions, the largest of which is approximately 30 m (98 ft) deep. As with many other Inca sites, it also has an irrigation system.

The purpose of these depressions is uncertain, but their depth, design, and orientation with respect to wind and sun creates a temperature difference of as much as 15 °C (25 °F) between the top and the bottom.

Closed depressions such as these can trap cold air, particularly on calm cloudless nights at altitude. Heat in the form of long-wave radiation is free to escape skyward and cold air is heavier than warmer air, so it flows downslope. In most landscapes the cooler air drains into the valleys creating down-canyon winds at night and leaving the higher slopes a few degrees warmer.

This pattern is called an inversion because the typical pattern of air cooling as elevation increases is inverted. If air can flow into a closed basin, the capture of cold air is accentuated. Warmer air is displaced from the basin leaving the cold air trapped under a stable inversion. Temperatures in the basins can be several degrees cooler than the surrounding lands and remain colder until strong winds flush the cold air out.

By being colder, the basins can simulate agriculture that is several thousand feet higher in elevation. Air at the bottom of the basin is typically colder than the air higher up, so the test altitude can be adjusted by moving the plantings a few feet up or down the slope. In this way, the basins at Moray permit crop testing at this single site, by a consistent group of scientists, thus providing much better control for their tests than spreading their tests to distant locations.

== Erosion threats to structure ==
During the rainy season of 2009–2010, the Department of Cusco received high levels of precipitation which caused damage to the ruins of Moray. The terraced levels of the complex, which are constructed from stone and compacted earth, were damaged extensively as the excessive rain waters undermined the ground beneath the structure.

The eastern side of the principal circle collapsed during February 2010, causing concerns about the permanence of the site as a top tourist attraction in Peru. A temporary wooden support structure was erected to prevent further collapse until reconstruction work could begin.

According to travel writer Paul Jones, "Although repair work at Moray continues to restore the site to its original state, lack of funds and continuing annual rainfall hinder progress. This interesting archaeological site which forms an important part of tourism to the region continues to be at risk of further degradation, should the repair work not be completed and maintained for the future years."

== Origin ==
This landmark is widely believed to have been used for farming, and soil samples have shown that soils were brought in from different regions to be used in helping grow crops at the different levels of the terraces. The wide temperature differences in the terraces have created microclimates, similar to what is achieved in greenhouses in modern times. The landmark also looks similar to an open pit mine. After the mining was done, the Incas could have reinforced the walls to prevent landslides and started to grow crops on the terraces.

== Gallery ==
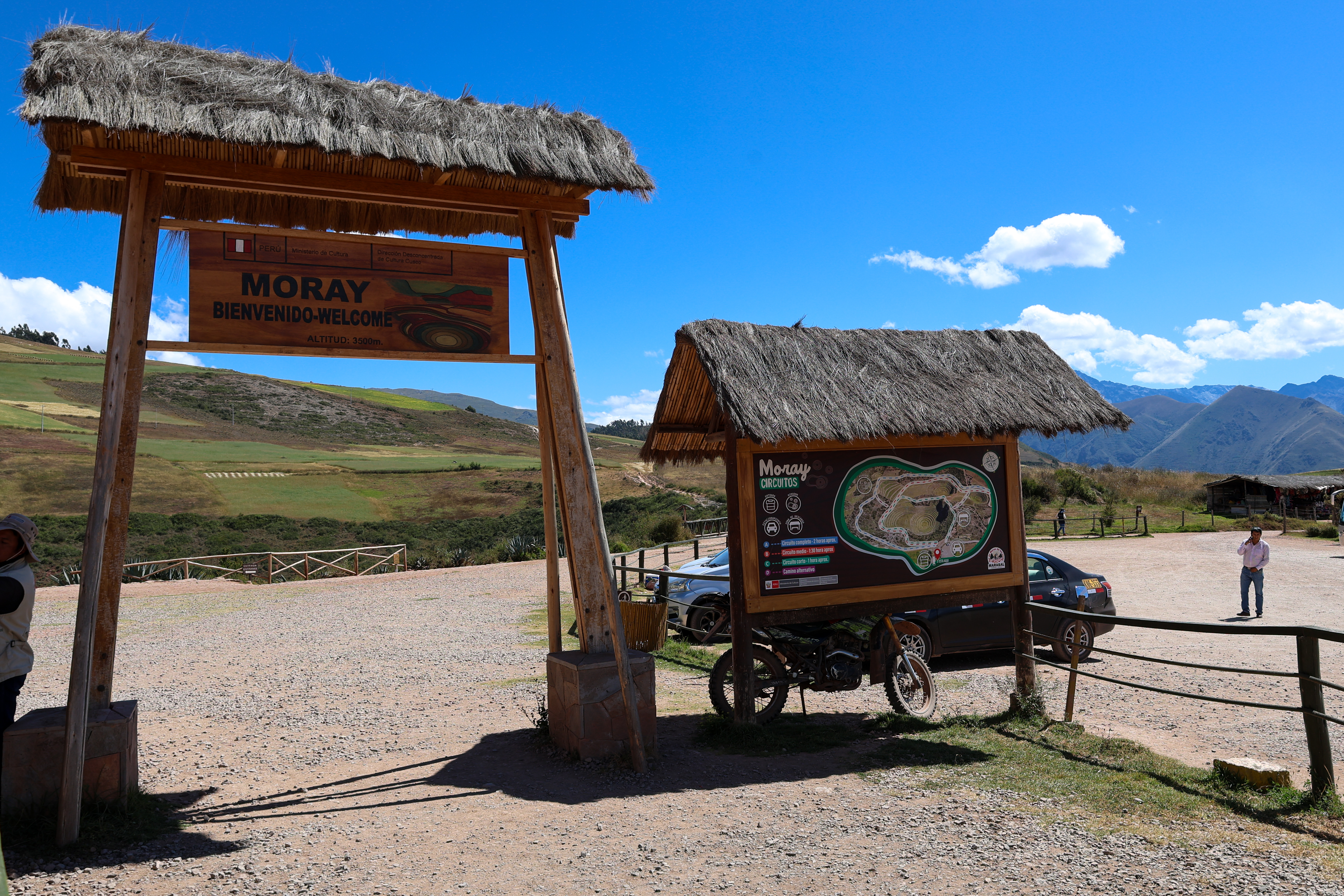
Entrance to the archaeological site

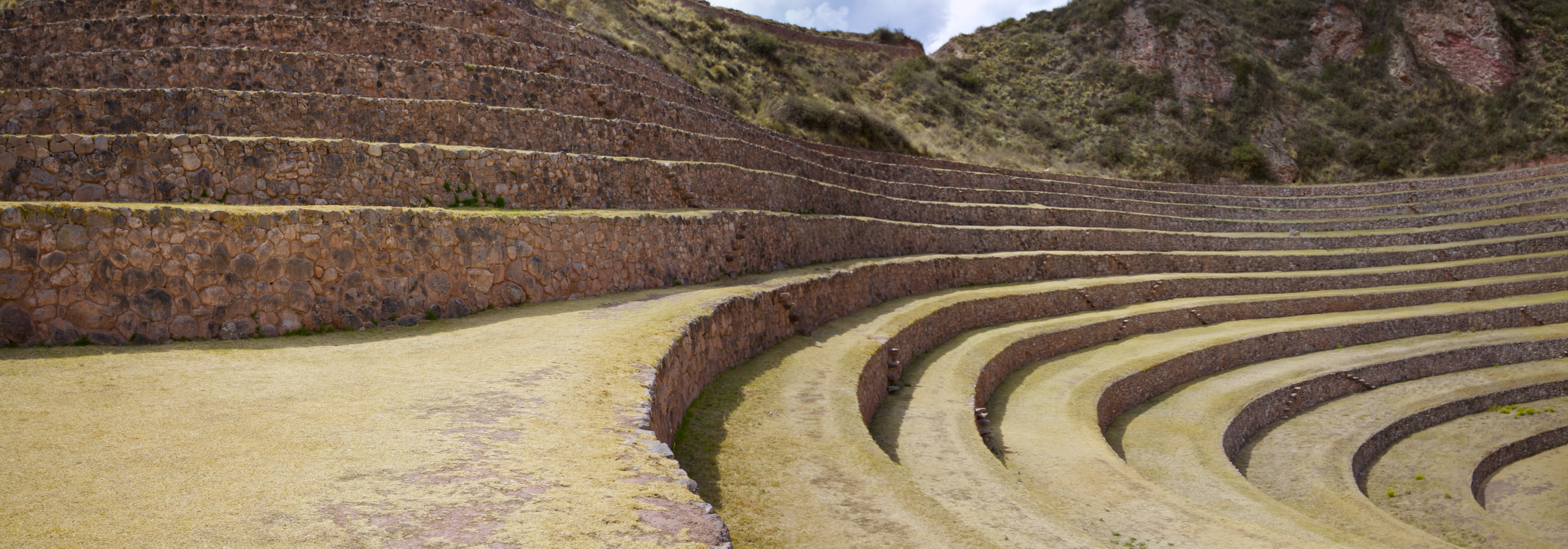
View of the curved terraces

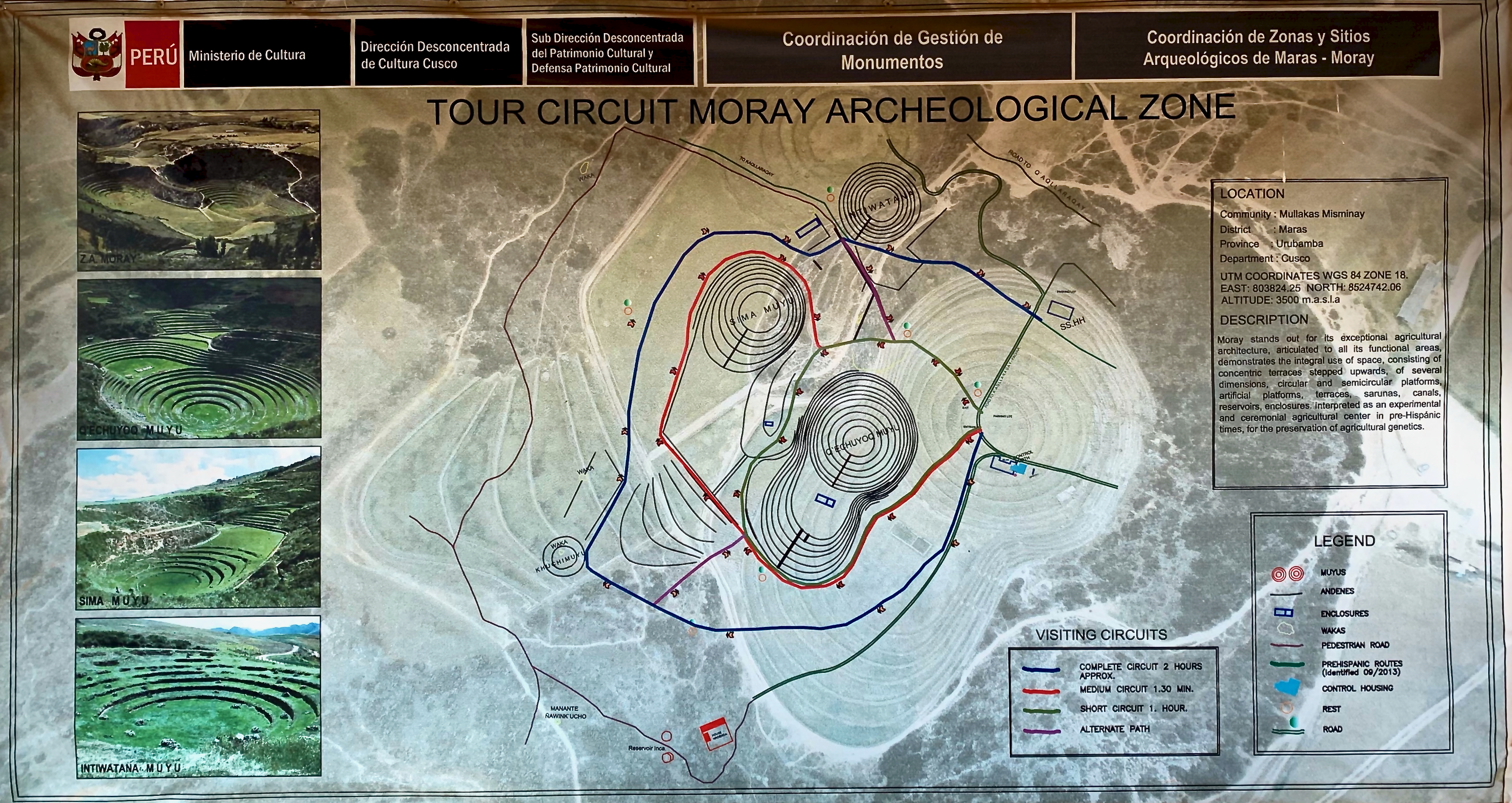
Tour circuit

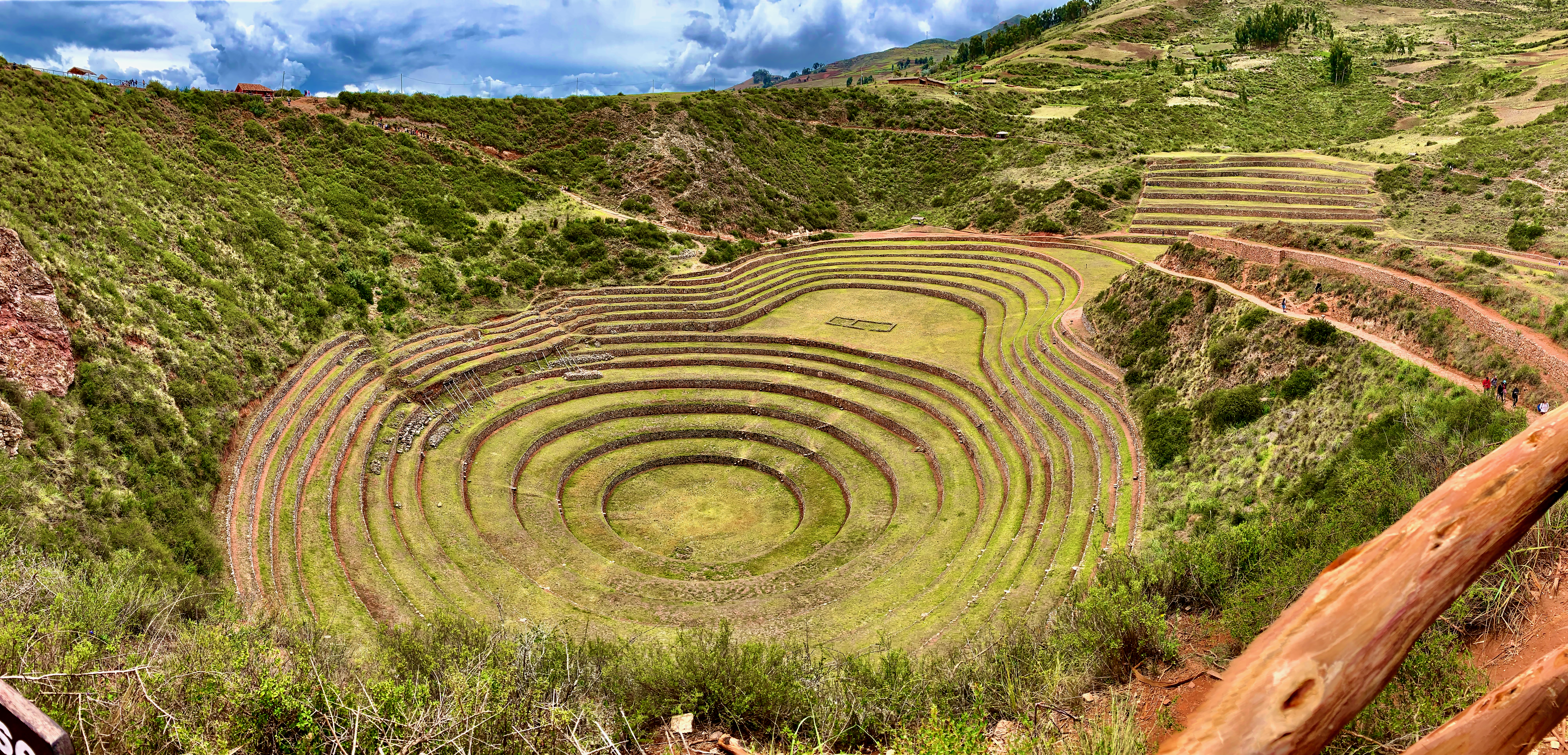
Panoramic view

== See also ==
- Vertical archipelago
