= Marash (disambiguation) =

Marash is the Armenian and Arabic name of Kahramanmaraş, a city in Turkey.

Marash may also refer to:

== Places ==
- Marash Eyalet, an eyalet of the Ottoman Empire
- Merash, or Marash, Iran
- Varosha, Famagusta, Turkish Maraş or Kapalı Maraş, an abandoned southern quarter of the Cypriot city of Famagusta
- Maraşlı, Karaisalı, a village in the District of Karaisalı, Adana Province, Turkey
- Marash Peak, the peak rising to 800 m in the southeast foothills of Detroit Plateau on Nordenskjöld Coast in Graham Land, Antarctica

== People ==
- Baldwin of Marash, 12th century
- Tatoul of Marash, Armenian ruler of Marash until 1104
- Marash Kumbulla (born 2000), Albanian professional footballer
- Dave Marash (born 1942), American TV journalist

== See also ==
- Maraş massacre (Turkish: Maraş katliamı), massacre of about one hundred left-wing activists in the city of Kahramanmaraş
- Marashis, an Iranian Shiʿite dynasty ruling in Mazandaran from 1359 to 1596
- Nork-Marash District
- Battle of Marash (disambiguation)
- Maraş (disambiguation)
