= Moira (given name) =

- Gender: Female

Origin
- Origin: Irish
- Meaning: Mary
- Region of origin: Ireland

Other names
- Related names: Mary, Maria, Maura

The name Moira, sometimes spelled Moyra, is an Anglicisation of the Irish name Máire, the Irish equivalent of Mary. Transliterated with Greek letters Μοίρα is the Greek word for Destiny, i.e. the three Fates.

== People ==
- Moira Anderson (born 1938), Scottish singer
- Moira Brinnand (born 1962), Argentine field hockey player
- Moira Brooker (born 1957), English actress
- Moira Brown, Canadian-born whale researcher
- Moira Buffini (born 1965), English dramatist, director, and actress
- Moira Cameron (born 1964), British soldier, first woman Yeoman Warder of the Tower of London
- Moira Chen, a stage name of actress Laura Gemser (born 1950) Indonesian-Dutch retired actress, model and costume designer
- Moira Crone (born 1952), American fiction author
- Moira Dela Torre (born 1993), Filipino singer-songwriter
- Moira Leiper Ducharme, first female mayor of Halifax, Nova Scotia
- Moyra Fraser (1923–2009), Australian-born English actress
- Moira Gatens (born 1954), Australian feminist philosopher and academic
- Moira Gibb (born 1950), British public servant and social work adviser
- Moira Gunn, American radio host
- Moira Harris (born 1954), American actress
- Moira Kelly (born 1968), American actress
- Moira Lister (1923–2007), South African actress
- Moira MacLeod (born 1957), British field hockey player
- Moira McLean, Australian television presenter
- Moira O'Neill (1864–1955), Irish-Canadian poet
- Moira Quirk, English actress
- Moira Rader, American politician
- Moira Rayner (born 1948), New Zealand-born, Australian-based barrister and human rights advocate
- Moira Redmond (1928–2006), English actress
- Moira Senior (born 1976), New Zealand field hockey player
- Moira Shearer (1926–2006), Scottish ballerina and actress
- Moira Stuart (born 1949), first Black woman newsreader on British television

== Fictional characters ==
- Moira Banning, wife of Peter Pan in the 1991 movie Hook
- Moira Barton, a recurring character in the soap opera Emmerdale
- Moira Brown, in the video game Fallout 3
- Moira Burton, in the video game Resident Evil: Revelations 2
- Moira Crewe, inn the novel Seveneves by Neal Stephenson
- Moira Davidson, in the 1957 novel On The Beach and its 1959 film adaptation
- Moira Linton, in the Malory Towers novel series by Enid Blyton
- Moira MacTaggert, a recurring character in X-Men comic books
- Moira O'Deorain, in the video game Overwatch
- Moira O'Hara, in the television series American Horror Story
- Moira Queen, Oliver Queen's mother in the Green Arrow comic books and the TV series Arrow
- Moira Rose, in the Canadian television series Schitt's Creek
- Moira Rutaquio-Tanyag, a villain in the Philippine drama series Abot-Kamay na Pangarap
- Moira/Max Sweeney, in the television series The L Word
- Moira Thaurissan, Queen Regent of the Dark Iron Clan, a minor character in the popular MMORPG World of Warcraft
- Moira Theirin, mother of Maric Theirin in Dragon Age video game franchise
- Moira Vahlen, in the video game XCOM: Enemy Unknown
- Moira, in Margaret Atwood's novel The Handmaid's Tale
- Moira, a minor character in the first episode of Pokémon: Black & White: Adventures in Unova
