= Maran (surname) =

Family name

Maran is a surname. Notable people with the surname include:

- Arnold Maran (1937–2017), Scottish otorhynolaryngologist
- Dayanidhi Maran (born 1966), Indian politician
- Elthon Maran (born 1989), Indonesian footballer
- George Maran (1926–2011), American opera, oratorio, and concert tenor
- Iko Maran (1915–1999), Estonian playwright and children's book author
- Josie Maran (born 1978), American model and actress
- Kalanithi Maran, Indian media baron
- Klaus Maran (born 1959), Italian windsurfer
- Meredith Maran (born 1951), American author
- Mohammed Maran (born 2001), Saudi footballer
- Mukundan Maran (born 1996), Singaporean footballer
- Murasoli Maran, Indian politician
- Olav Maran (born 1933), Estonian artist
- Rein Maran (born 1931), Estonian cinematographer
- René Maran (1887–1960), French poet and novelist
- Rolando Maran (born 1963), Italian football manager
- Rodolfo Marán (born 1897), Uruguayan footballer
- Stephen P. Maran, American astronomer
- Timo Maran (born 1975), Estonian biosemiotician and poet
