= Muire =

Irish name for the Blessed Virgin Mary

Muire (English: Mary; Irish: [ˈmˠɪɾʲə]) is an Irish name given exclusively to the Blessed Virgin Mary. The Irish name Máire is typically used for the name Mary. Muire is used exclusively for the Virgin Mary.

The only known exception to this rule is in the song Caoineadh na dTrí Mhuire (English: Lament of the Three Marys), in which the three Marys present at the crucifixion speak their thoughts. The name Muire is used so as not to give the Blessed Virgin Mary a common name.

== Court Title ==
It is suggested that the word Muire in the context below did not exist in that spelling.

A court title in pre-Norman Ireland, and for a time after the Norman invasions when Gaelic nobility maintained varying levels of tradition. The Muire, or Muiredach is the Marshal of a territory of an Irish noble or free-landholder of the rank of Boaire or higher. In exchange for service, he was gifted a portion of land called a Methas, a region of farmland similar to that held by an Ocaire (a free-landholder below the nobility and subservient to the Boaire.)

His duties included acting as a sheriff and levying the Ceithernn, or warband, during times of war or regional emergency, and during war, his rank included a command position on the battlefield, and he was allowed to keep a 'small' court, including his own standard-bearer, shield maker, and cupbearer for ceremonies, though he was technically a member of his overlords' court. He was the head of his master's Cliarthairí, the 'guards' or 'troopers', professional soldiers inhabiting the territory of a Boaire or noble. He also had the duty of acting as Muire Rechtgi, the intermediary between the local king and his subjects during a legal dispute, appearing in his place at court. Often he would also take the duty of the Rechtaire, or tax collector.

== In popular culture ==
Muire are featured as a recruitable heavy infantry unit for the Ireland faction in the Kingdoms expansion to the PC strategy game Medieval II: Total War.
