= Maura, Madhepura =

Village in Bihar, India

Maura Moura Jharkaha
- Village
- Location within Bihar Location within India
- Coordinates: 26°04′40″N 86°52′23″E
- Country: India
- State: Bihar
- District: Madhepura
- Block: Shankarpur

Government
  - Type: Village Panchayat

Area
  - Total: 47.32 km^{2} (18.27 sq mi)
- Elevation: 54 m (177 ft)

Population (2011)
  - Total: 42,528
  - Density: 898.7/km^{2} (2,328/sq mi)

Languages
  - Official: Hindi, Maithili
- Time zone: UTC+5:30 (IST)
- PIN: 852128
- STD code: 0192
- Vehicle registration: BR-43

Maura, or Moura Jharkaha, is a village in Shankarpur Block, Madhepura District, Bihar, India. It is located in the north of the district, approximately 19 kilometres northeast of the district capital Madhepura, and 5 kilometres north of the block capital Shankarpur. As of 2011, it has a population of 42,528.

== Geography ==
Maura is located on the south of Latona Noyrth, west of Garha Rampur, north of Behrari, and east of Rampur Lahi. Its area is 4732 hectares.

== Demographics ==
According to the 2011 Census of India, Maura contains 8,790 households. Among the 42,528 residents, 22,202 are male and 20,326 are female. The literacy rate is 41.68%, with 11,087 of the male population and 6,638 of the female population being literate. The census location code of the village is 225905.
