= Maura =

Maura may refer to:

- Maura (given name), a feminine given name
- Antonio Maura (1853–1925), Prime Minister of Spain
- Carmen Maura (born 1945), Spanish actress
- Miguel Maura (1887–1971), Spanish politician
- Santa Maura, a former name of the Greek island of Lefkada
- Muara, Brunei, a town in Brunei Darussalam
- Maura, Madhepura, a village in Bihar, India
- Maura, Norway, a village
- Maura (insect), a genus of grasshoppers

== See also ==
- Mauro (disambiguation)
- Maurus (disambiguation)
- San Mauro (disambiguation)
