= San Mauro =

San Mauro may refer to:

== People ==
- Saint Maurus (it. : San Mauro), an Italian Christian saint
- Rabanus Maurus (780–856), German Christian saint

== Places in Italy ==
- San Mauro Castelverde, a municipality in the Province of Palermo
- San Mauro Cilento, a municipality in the Province of Salerno
- San Mauro di Saline, a municipality in the Province of Verona
- San Mauro Forte, a municipality in the Province of Matera
- San Mauro la Bruca, a municipality in the Province of Salerno
- San Mauro Marchesato, a municipality in the Province of Crotone
- San Mauro Pascoli, a municipality in the Province of Forlì-Cesena
- San Mauro Torinese, a municipality in the Province of Turin

== Sports ==
- UD San Mauro, a Spanish football team

== See also ==
- Mauro (disambiguation)
- Maura (disambiguation)
- Maurus (disambiguation)
