= Marrah =

Marrah may refer to:

- Marrah Mountains, Sudan
- Maraq, Markazi, a village in Iran

== See also ==
- Marah (disambiguation)
- Marra (disambiguation)
