= Battle of Marash (disambiguation) =

The Battle of Marash (1920) was an important battle in the Franco-Turkish War.

Battle of Marash may also refer to:

- Siege of Germanicia or Siege of Marash (638), the siege and capture of Marash (then known as Germanicia) by the Arabs
- Siege of Marash (904), an unsuccessful siege by the Byzantines under Andronikos Doukas
- Battle of Marash (953), a battle between the Byzantines and Sayf al-Dawla
- Battle of Marash (1161) a battle between the Crusaders and Zengids

== See also ==
- Kahramanmaraş
