= Maraš =

Maraš (Serbian Cyrillic: Мараш, pronounced [mǎraʃ]) is a Serbo-Croatian surname. Notable people with the surname include:

- Ivan Maraš (born 1986), Montenegrin professional basketballer
- Maja Maraš (born 1991), Montenegrin beauty queen
- Marjana Maraš (born 1970), Serbian politician
- Nikola Maraš (born 1995), Serbian professional footballer

== See also ==
- Maras (surname)
