= Mauro (surname) =

Mauro may refer to:

- Bill Mauro (born c. 1956), Canadian politician
- Bruno Mauro (born 1973), Angolan footballer
- Carmen Mauro (1926–2003), American baseball player
- Eve Mauro (born 1981), American actress
- Garry Mauro (born 1948), politician from Texas
- Michael Mauro (born 1948), Iowa Secretary of State
- Philip Mauro (1859–1952), American lawyer and author
- Ryan Mauro (born 1986), American national security analyst
- Vic Mauro (born 1987), Australian rugby player
- Vincent Mauro (1943–2024), Italian-American FIFA football referee

== See also ==
- Mauro (disambiguation)
- Mauro (given name)
