= Marans (disambiguation) =

Marans is a type of chicken.

Marans also refers to:

- Marans, Charente-Maritime, a commune in the department of Charente-Maritime, France
- Marans, Maine-et-Loire, a former commune in the department of Maine-et-Loire, France

== See also ==
- Maran (disambiguation)
