= Marra =

Marra may refer to:

- Marra (folklore)
- Marra people of Australia
  - Marra language
- Marra (surname) (including a list of persons with the name)
- Marrah Mountains in Sudan
- Marra Farm in Washington, US
- Marra, Goa, a village in Bardez, India

== See also ==
- Mara (disambiguation)
- Marrah (disambiguation)
- Marran (disambiguation)
