= Mehri =

Mehri or Mahri may refer to:

- Mehri people, an ethnic group of Oman and Yemen
- Mehri language, the Modern South Arabian language spoken by them
- Mahri, Jammu and Kashmir, a village in India

== People ==
- Abdelhamid Mehri (1926–2012), Algerian resistance fighter and politician
- Djilali Mehri (born 1937), Algerian executive
- Momtaza Mehri (born 1995), Somali-British poet and essayist
- Sulaiman Al Mahri (1480–1550), Arab navigator
- Mehri Yalfani, Persian-language writer
- Mehri Mehrnia (1915–2009), Iranian actress

== See also ==
- Mahra (disambiguation)
