= Mauro Martini Raccasi =

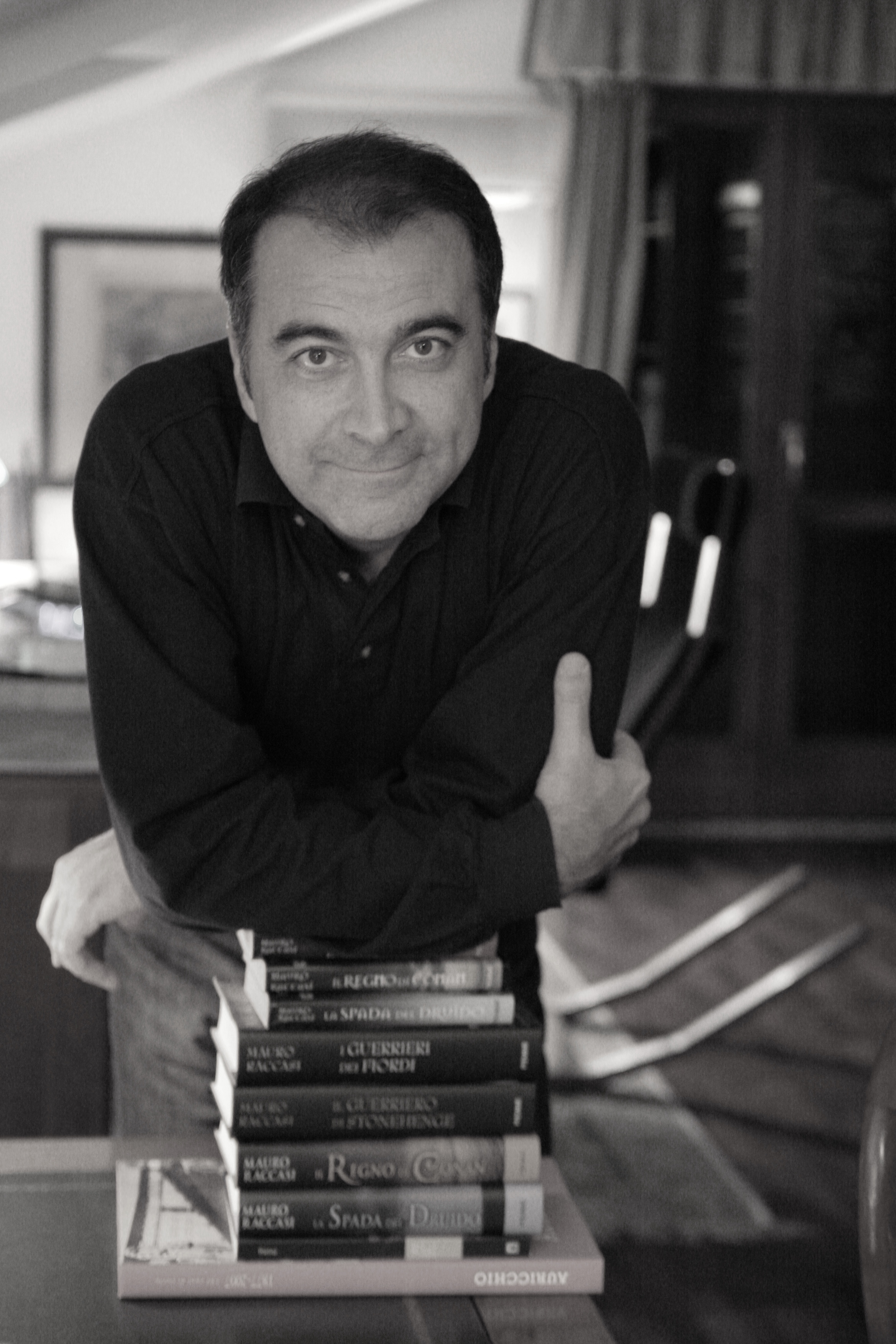
- Born: Mauro Raccasi; 21 October 1959 (age 66); Parma, IT
- Occupations: Novelist, Journalist, Screenwriter
- Website: www.mauroraccasi.it

Mauro Martini Raccasi (Parma, Italy, October 21, 1959) is an Italian novelist, screenwriter and journalist.

He divides his time between his city and France as well as his passion for romance and love for cinema. He was the first person in Italy to take a degree in Economics at the IFOR Institute of the Bocconi University in Milan presenting a thesis on journalism. Then, being a Jack of dozens of sad trades with Swedish and German companies before addressing himself to literature and cinema. He fractured his spine falling from a motorbike in the autumn of 2000, risking both death and paralysis. One hundred days of pain and sleeplessness and eighteen months of rehabilitation got him plenty of time to start serious writing. He signed historical screenplays and published historical fiction serial translated abroad, action-thriller novels, children's books, illustrated books, authorized biographies. He has held the position of Press Office, wrote journalistic contents contributions for many books and press articles of various kinds. For his fiction, he coined his own trademark, the rule of the three A's: Action, Adventure and (love) Attraction.

He is also teacher in a creative writing school and juror in literary prizes.

== Works ==
- Il Romanzo dei Celti - La spada del druido (Piemme-Mondadori, 2004) (The Celtic Novels - The Druid's Sword
- Il Romanzo dei Celti - Il regno di Conan (Piemme-Mondadori, 2005) (The Celtic Novels – Conan’s Kingdom
- Il Romanzo dei Celti - Il guerriero di Stonehenge (Piemme-Mondadori, 2006) (The Celtic Novels - The Warrior of Stonehenge)
- Il Romanzo dei Celti - I guerrieri dei fiordi (Piemme-Mondadori, 2007) (The Celtic Novels – The Fjords Warriors
- Auricchio 1877-2007 (2007)
- Guida Artistica di Parma (Edizioni Electa, 2007) (An Artistic Guide to Parma)
- Forst (2009)
- Il Diamante è per Sempre (2009) (The Diamond is forever)
- Codice Haggard (Asengard, 2010) (Haggard Code
- TomTom e il Re Scorpione (ELI-La Spiga, 2011) (TomTom and the Scorpion King)
- Storie con i Fiocchi (ELI-La Spiga, 2011) (Slap-up Stories)
- TomTom e i Predoni Vichinghi (ELI-La Spiga, 2012) (TomTom and the Viking Marauder)
- Rats (2013)
- Il Mistero del Tortellino Mannaro (ELI-La Spiga, 2012) (The Mystery of the Ware-Tortellino
- The Vikings - Episode 1 - Viking Dawn (screenplay co-writer for Fact TV UK & Millstream UK, 2015)
- The Vikings - Episode 2 - Viking Kingdom (screenplay co-writer for Fact TV UK & Millstream UK, 2015)
- The Vikings - Episode 3 - Eastern Promise (screenplay co-writer for Fact TV UK & Millstream UK, 2015)
- The Vikings - Episode 4 - Viking Weapons (screenplay co-writer for Fact TV UK & Millstream UK, 2015)
- The Vikings - Episode 5 - Raiders and Explorers (screenplay co-writer for Fact TV UK & Millstream UK, 2015)
- 20.000 Leghe sotto i mari (ELI-La Spiga, 2016) (20.000 Leagues under the Sea )
- Le Avventure di Sherlock Holmes (ELI-La Spiga, 2018) (The Adventures of Sherlock Holmes )
- Parmigiani per Sempre (Edizioni della Sera, 2022) (To be Parmesan Forever)
