= Maras District =

Coordinates: 13.3361°S 72.1566°W

Maras
- District
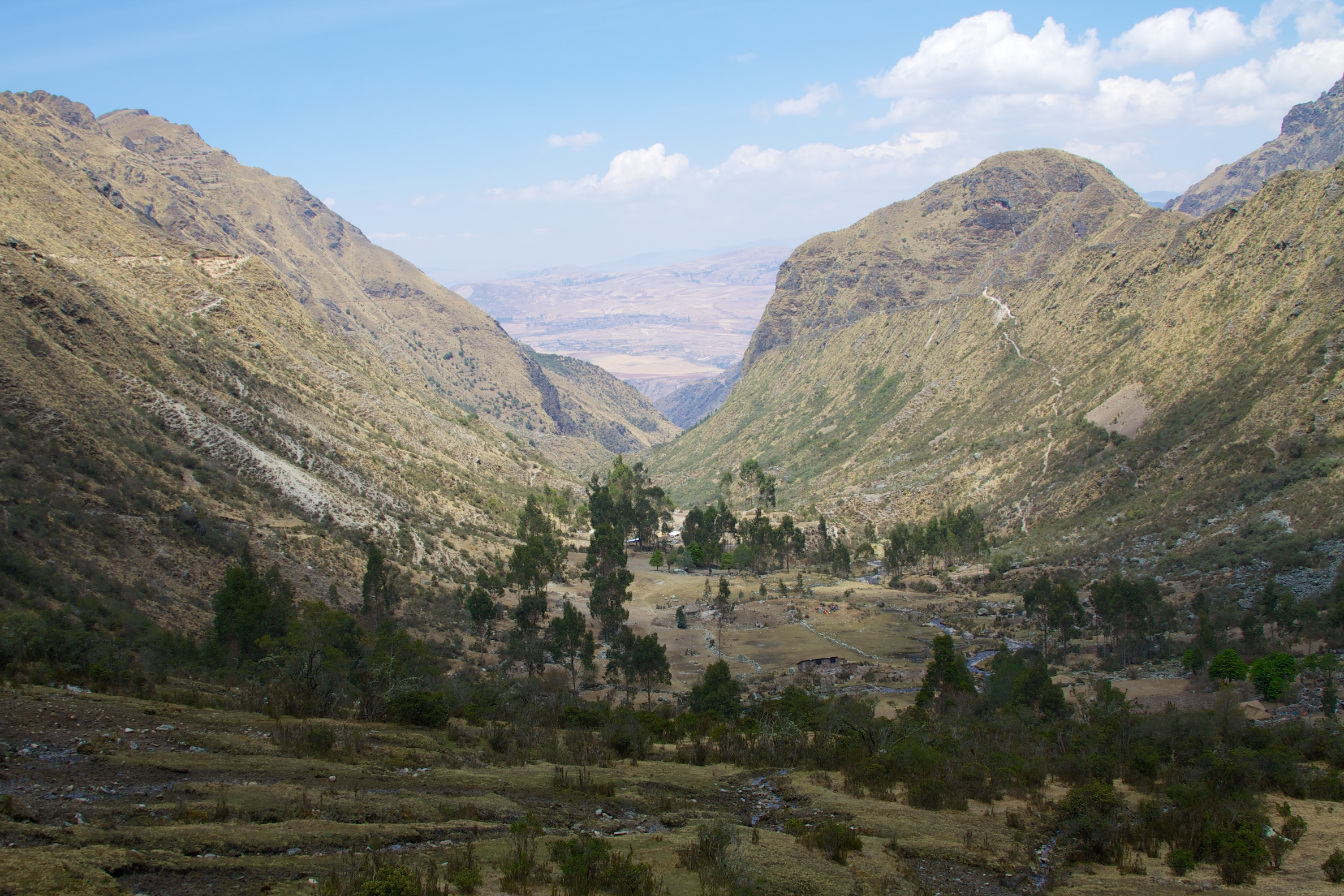
- Looking down the valley from Paqchaspata (Urubamba District) towards the Maras District (in the background)
- Interactive map of Maras
- Country: Peru
- Region: Cusco
- Province: Urubamba
- Founded: January 2, 1857
- Capital: Maras

Government
  - Mayor: Eriberto Quispe Tito

Area
  - Total: 131.85 km^{2} (50.91 sq mi)
- Elevation: 3,385 m (11,106 ft)

Population (2025)
  - Total: 8,624
  - Density: 65.41/km^{2} (169.4/sq mi)
- Time zone: UTC-5 (PET)
- UBIGEO: 081305
- Website: munimaras.gob.pe

Maras District is one of seven districts of the Urubamba Province in Peru. The town of Maras is the capital of the district.

== Geography ==
One of the highest peaks of the district is Hatun Urqu at approximately 4,000 m (13,000 ft). Other mountains are Sullu Qaqa and Wayna Urqu.

== Ethnic groups ==
The people in the district are mainly indigenous citizens of Quechua descent. Quechua is the language which the majority of the population (79.29%) learnt to speak in childhood, 20.42% of the residents started speaking using the Spanish language (2007 Peru Census).
