= Mahra =

Mahra may refer to:

== Middle East ==
- Al-Mahrah Governorate, a governorate in Yemen
- Mahra Sultanate, a historical sultanate in South Arabia
- Mehri people, an ethnic group of Oman and Yemen
- Mehri language, the Modern South Arabian language spoken by them
- Sheikha Mahra, one of the Dubai Sheikh's daughters

== South Asia ==
- Mahra, Khyber Pakhtunkhwa, a town in Pakistan
- Mahendra Singh Mahra (born 1937), Indian MP
- Ummed Singh Mahra (1942–1971), Indian soldier

== See also ==
- Mehri (disambiguation)
- Marha (disambiguation)
- Marah (disambiguation)
- Mahara (disambiguation)
- Mehra also Mahra, an Indian surname
- Mehrotra, an Indian surname, shortened as Mehra or Mahra
- Malhotra, an Indian surname, also shortened as Mehra or Mahra
