= Māra (given name) =

Female given name

- Gender: Female
- Name day: March 25

Origin
- Region of origin: Latvia

Other names
- Related names: Mary, Maria, Mārīte, Māris

Māra is a Latvian feminine given name. The associated name day is March 25. Although identical to the name of Māra, a goddess in Latvian mythology, the given name is believed to have originated from the name Marija, alongside Māriņa.

The first written mention of the name Māra appears in documents from the Trikāta Kirchspiel (church region) in 1765.

== Notable people named Māra ==
- Māra Grīva (born 1989), Latvian athlete
- Māra Zālīte (born 1952), Latvian writer
- Māra Lāce (born 1954), Latvian art historian, former director of the Latvian National Museum of Art
