= Bayt Marran (Sanaa) =

Bayt Marran بيت مران
- Sub-district
- Location in Yemen
- Country: Yemen
- Governorate: Sana'a
- District: Arhab

Population (2004)
  - Total: 3,161
- Time zone: UTC+3

Bayt Marran (Arabic: بيت مران) is a sub-district located in Arhab District, Sana'a Governorate, Yemen. Bayt Marran had a population of 3161 according to the 2004 census.
