= Mara, Kerman =

Mara مراع
- Village
- Location within Iran
- Coordinates: 30°38′36″N 54°41′01″E
- Country: Iran
- Province: Kerman
- County: Shahr-e Babak
- Bakhsh: Dehaj
- Rural District: Khabar

Population (2006)
  - Total: 149
- Time zone: UTC+3:30 (IRST)
  - Summer (DST): UTC+4:30 (IRDT)

Mara (Persian: مراع, also Romanized as Marā‘) is a village in Khabar Rural District, Dehaj District, Shahr-e Babak County, Kerman Province, Iran. According to the 2006 census, the population is 149, in 25 families.
