= Māras =

Māras ([mɑːras̪]) or Māra Day (Latvian: Māras diena; sometimes referred to as the Great Māra Day or Mother Day) was a Latvian festival, devoted to Māra, an ancient deity,.

There are four Mara days: Winter Mara or Candlemass (Latvian: Ziemas Māra) on February 2nd; Spring Mara (Latvian: Pavasara Māra or Latvian: Kāposta Māra) on March 25; Summer Mara (Latvian: Lielā Māra) on August 15 and Little or Autumn Mara (Latvian: Mazā jeb Rudens Māra) on September 8.

According to the solar calendar, Māras marks the midpoint between Jāņi, which is summer solstice, and Miķeļi, which represents the end of the harvest season. The actual date, likely, is the result of Christian influence, identifying Māra with Virgin Mary, whose devoted holiday (Assumption of Mary) is observed on 15 August.

== See also ==
- Māra
- Virgin Mary
- Assumption of Mary
