= Battle of Marash (1161) =

- Part of the Crusades
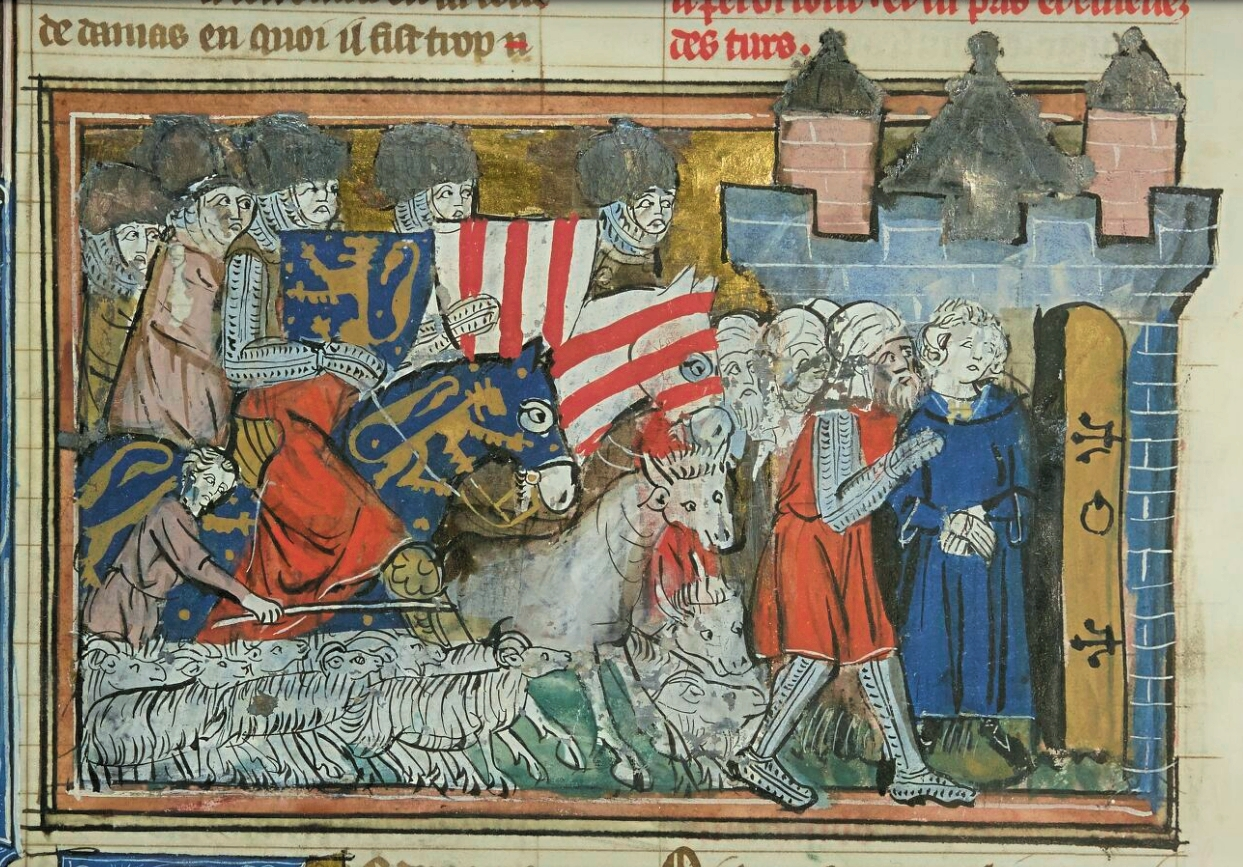
- Raynald as a prisoner
| Date | 23 November 1161 |
| Location | Kahramanmaraş, Turkey |
| Result | Zengid victory |

Belligerents
| Principality of Antioch | Zengid dynasty |

Commanders and leaders
| Raynald of Châtillon (POW) | Majd ad-Din ibn al-Daya |

Strength
| 120 knights 500 infantry | Unknown |

Casualties and losses
| 400 killed | Unknown |

The Battle of Marash was a military engagement between the Crusader force of Antioch led by Raynald of Châtillon and the Zengid forces from Aleppo. Raynald launched a raid against the Zengids, capturing cattle, but was intercepted and captured by the Muslim forces.

== Background ==
The Byzantine emperor Manuel I Komnenos made an alliance with Nur al-Din Zengi against the Seljuk Sultan Kilij Arslan II. While Zengi was absent, engaging the Seljuk Sultan, King Baldwin III of Jerusalem launched raids into the Damascene territory, breaking the truce with Zengi. Baldwin raided the Hauran and was able to extort 4,000 gold pieces alongside 6 knights from the governor of Damascus. In late 1161, the prince of Antioch, Raynald of Châtillon, decided to do the same. He set his eyes on the areas between Marash and Dülük. Since the area was far from Antioch, it was difficult to transport a large number of cattle. The majority of the inhabitants there were native Christians, so Raynald didn't bother to rob them.

== Prelude ==
On November 1161, Raynald set out with a force of 120 knights and 500 infantry. His men fell upon the surprised herdsmen, looting their animals and riches. The Crusaders gained much booty from this raid and returned home, although their march was slow. The governor of Aleppo, Majd ad-Din ibn al-Daya, heard the news and quickly marched out with a large force of Turkish cavalry. The Zengids managed to intercept the Crusaders near Marash. On the 20th, the Muslims attempted to ambush, although Raynald's scout detected them. He halted his force at night to discuss the next move. Heated discussion happened between his counsels; some suggested that they should abandon their spoils, while others argued to fight back. Raynald decided to fight.

== Battle ==
On the 23rd, Raynald formed his battle position with the infantry in the line of defense while the cavalry was arranged in one group, forming a barrier for the cattle, which were withdrawing slowly to Antioch. The Turks launched their assault, but the Crusaders managed to repel them. Throughout the day, the Zengids charged against the Crusaders, resulting in fierce hand-to-hand combat with maces and swords. The Zengids harassed the Crusaders with constant arrows while the Crusader cavalry charged against them. The battle continued until afternoon when the Crusaders lost their cohesion due to constant attacks. The Crusaders retreated, and the Zengids chased them, massacring them in great numbers. Raynald attempted to rally his men but failed, and soon he was surrounded by the Turks. He was captured in the end alongside the survivors. Of the prisoners, only 30 valuable ones were spared, while the rest were executed. The Crusaders lost 400 men in total.

== Aftermath ==
After Raynald's capture, no one hurried to pay the ransom of the prince, neither the barons of Antioch nor the king of Jerusalem. Raynald would spend 16 years captive in Aleppo's prisons. During his captivity, his wife died, and the principality was passed to Bohemond III. Bohemond would ransom Raynald for 120,000 dinars. Following Raynald's capture, the Antiochenese begged the Latin king for help. The king arranged its affairs and handed the administration to the patriarch.

== Sources ==
- Jeffrey Lee (2017), God's Wolf: The Life of the Most Notorious of All Crusaders, Scourge of Saladin.
- Malcolm Barber (2012), The Crusader States.
- Chase Robinson (2003), Texts, Documents and Artefacts: Islamic Studies in Honour of D.S. Richards.
- Reinhold Röhricht (1898) History of the Kingdom of Jerusalem (1100-1291) (In German).
