= Dan Mara =

Personal information
- Born: Hartford, CT

Career history

Coaching
- 1976–1995: Sports Information Director/Coordinating Recruitment
- 1977–1979: Women's Softball & Basketball (assistant)
- 1979–1990: Baseball Coach
- 1990–1991: Softball Coach
- 1984–1995: Women's Basketball
- 1996-1997: Men's Basketball

Career highlights
- As Coach: National Junior College Athletic Association (NJCAA) Final Four in 1994 and 1995; Ten NJCAA New England Women's Basketball Championships; Mitchell College Athletic Hall of Fame in 1998; New England Basketball Hall of Fame in 2003; NJCAA Basketball Hall of Fame in 2008; Connecticut Women's Basketball Hall of Fame in 2019; Nine time NJCAA New England Women's Basketball Coach of the Year; Six time Colonial States Athletic Conference (CSAC) Coach of the Year; Three time NJCAA District Coach of the Year; Converse District One Coach of the Year in 1994; CSAC Softball Coach of the Year in 1990 and 1991; CACC Athletic Director of the Year in 1997, 2001 and 2003; NAIA Region X Athletic Director of the Year in 2001; ECAC Conference Commissioner of the Year in 2016; Irish Education 100 in 2016 and 2017

Danny "Dan" Mara is a retired college basketball coach, Commissioner and former Chair of the Membership Committee. He spent 16 years directing a highly successful basketball camp at Mitchell where he is considered a special alumni. As head coach at Mitchell, he coached ten Kodak All-Americans including future Women's National Basketball Association (WNBA) player Rita Williams. Williams went on to University of Connecticut to lead them to the 1998 Big East Championship and was named tournament Most Valuable Player (MVP). She was the 12th pick in the 1998 WNBA draft and was chosen as the first all-star game representative in Indiana Fever history. As coach of the New London, Connecticut junior college team, Mara was the guardian of the longest regular-season winning streak in college basketball. In his coaching career at Mitchell College, Mara still lived on campus, in Matteson Hall, a men's dorm. He roomed with Pep, a 16-year-old Samoyed and collie mix, who until the 1994 basketball season sat beside him at home games. To players he is something of a father figure to potential athletes, because each year Mara looks after stray players who, for various reasons, have not found a place at a four-year college, and he makes them part of his family.

== Early years ==
In an article for Sports Illustrated in 1994, he said, "Mitchell College adopted me when I had nothing left to lose." Dan Mara, then 39, was an only child whose father, James, died when Dan was two. Seventeen years later, while a sophomore at Mitchell, Mara lost his mother, Elizabeth, in a fire.

Mara graduated in 1974 and earned a Bachelor's in English in 1976. After his college graduation, Mitchell offered him a summer job as a Residence hall director. He started his career in the NJCAA in 1976 as Sports information director. Mara was promoted to Assistant Athletic Director in 1978 and his duties included sports information as well as coordinating recruitment for all sports.

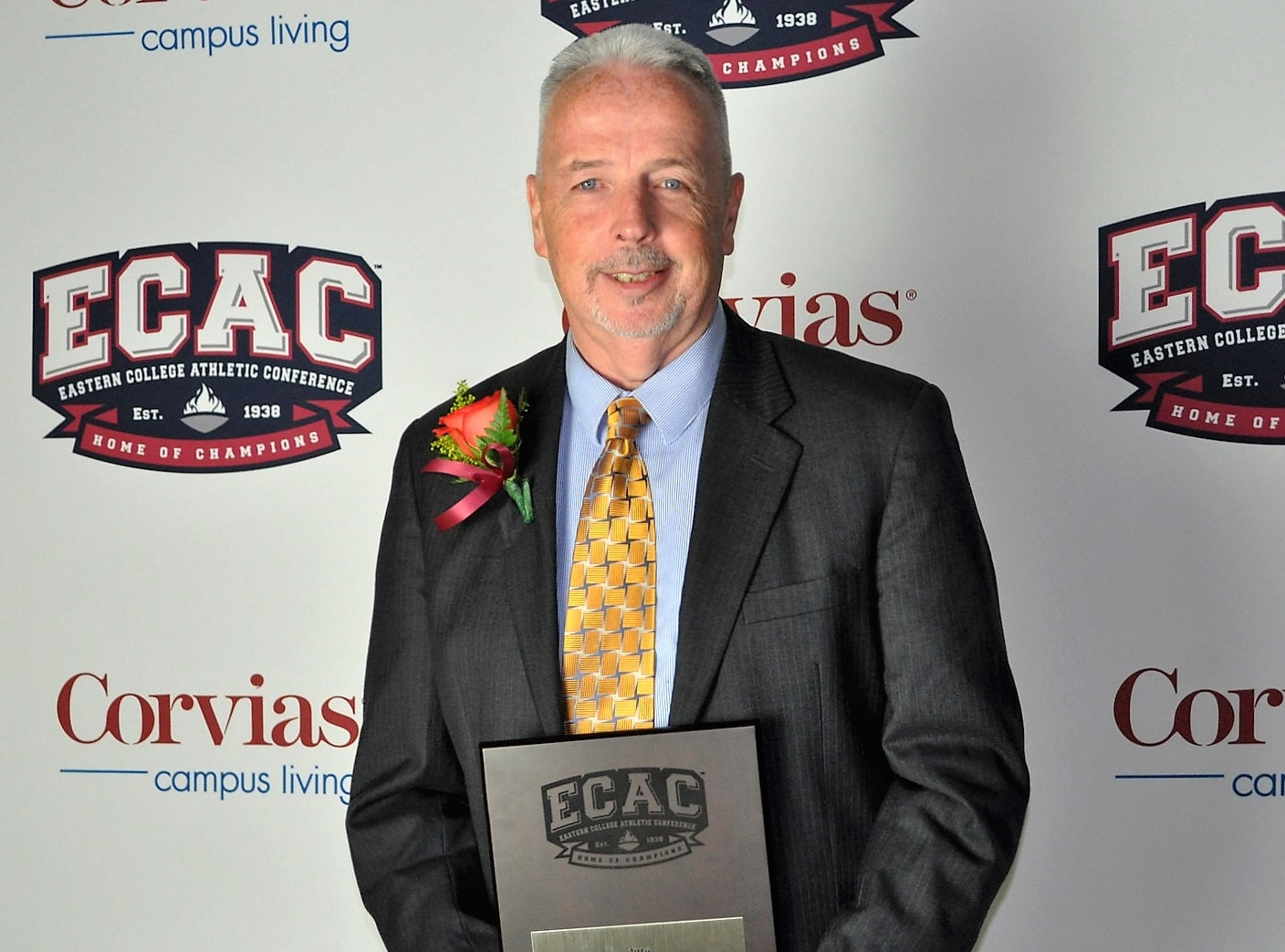
Dan Mara, 2016 ECAC Conference Commissioner of the Year

== Coaching ==
In 1977, he began coaching as Softball Assistant Coach and Women's Basketball Assistant Coach. In 1979 was promoted as Mitchell's Baseball Coach due to Jim Grant (at the time was head coach) sustained a broken hip in a car accident.

=== Coaching technique ===
Mara knows that players like to run and hate to play defense, so he sets goals his players enjoy achieving. In a Sports Illustrated article, Mara states,"We try to score 25 points every 10 minutes," says the coach, whose team averaged a top-rated 99.6 points per game last year. "Defense?" he asks facetiously. "Who cares? We don't play D to stop the other team from scoring, we play it to dictate tempo." Which explains why the Mariners will stay in a full-court zone press for the entire game, creating dozens of turnovers and layups per outing. Mara has a brilliant basketball mind. "He's the most cerebral coach I know," says his best friend, Al Sokaitis, the former men's coach at Post University. "He understands the game."
