= Marah =

Marah may refer to:

- Marah (plant) or manroot, a kind of wild cucumber
- Marah (band), an American rock band
- Marah (Bible), one of the locations which the Torah identifies as having been travelled through by the Israelites during the Exodus
- Micha Marah, Belgian popular singer
- Marah, a variant of the Irish name O'Meara
- Marah, (Arabic) Joy or happiness
- Marah Wagner (born 2000), American ice hockey player

== See also ==
- Mara (disambiguation)
- Marrah (disambiguation)
- Mahra (disambiguation)
