= Mani Maaran =

Tamil scholar

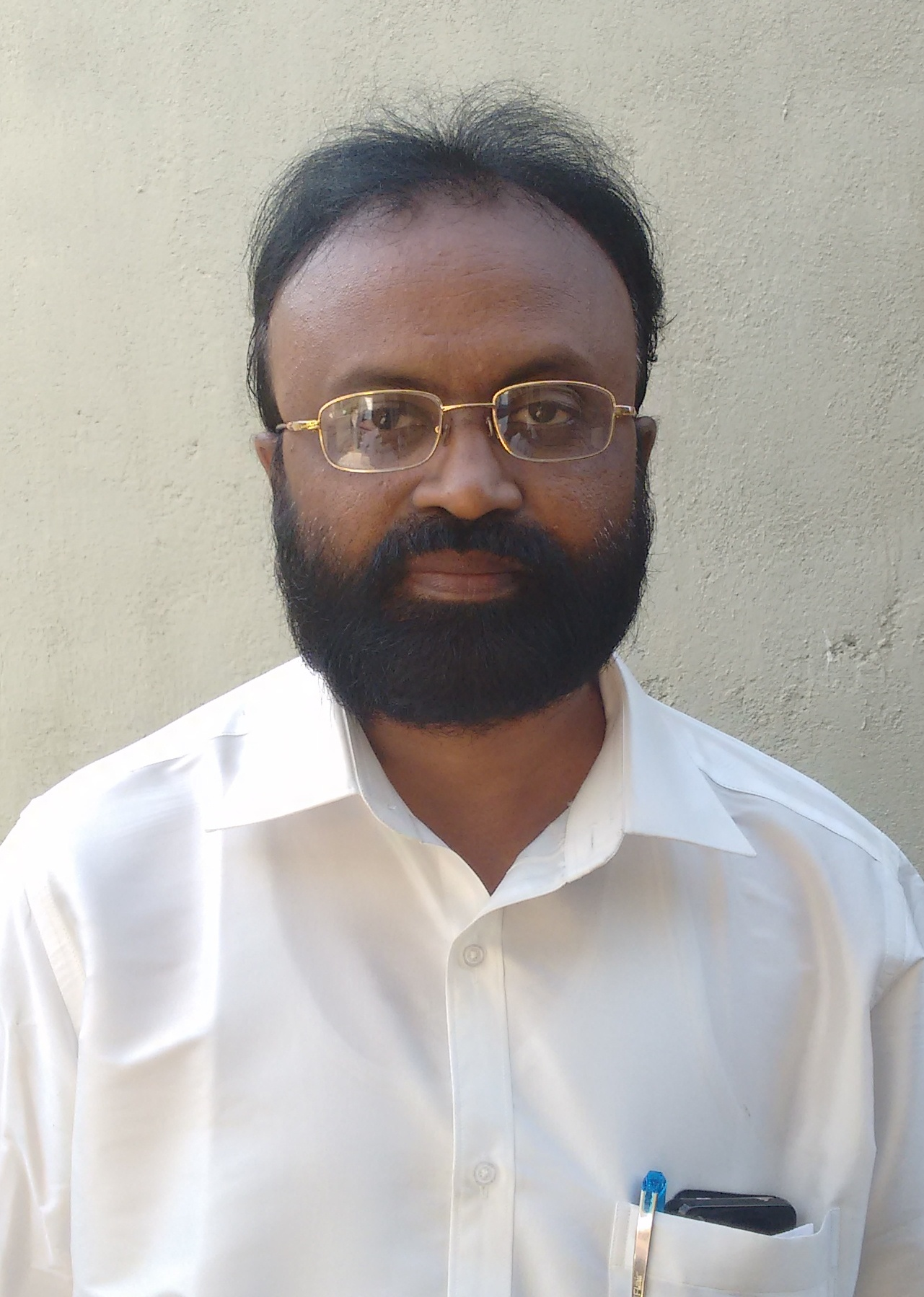
Mani. Maaran

T.M Saraboji Also known as Mani Maran (மணி மாறன்) (born 23 March 1970), is one of the Tamil scholars Tamil Nadu. He is working as Tamil Pandit at Saraswathi Mahal Library located at Tanjore in Tamil Nadu. He is interested in Tamil language, art, culture and manuscriptology and is contributed in these areas.

== Books ==
=== Publications of Saraswathi Mahal Library ===
- Tamil Ennum Eluthum (Tamil: தமிழ் எண்ணும் எழுத்தும்)
- Tamilari Madanthai Kathai (Tamil: தமிழறி மடந்தை கதை).
- Tamil Research Articles (Tamil: தமிழாய்வுக்கட்டுரைகள்), 2012
- Azhagar Anthathi (Tamil: அழகர் அந்தாதி) (Editor), 2012
- Sarabendra Boopala Kuravanji (Tamil: சரபேந்திர பூபாலக்குறவஞ்சி) (Editor), 2013
- Arapalisvara Sathakam (Tamil: அறப்பளீசுர சதகம்) (Editor), 2014
- Tirukaruvai Pathitruppathanthadhi by Athiveerama Pandiyar (Tamil: அதிவீரராம பாண்டியர் அருளிய திருக்கருவைப் பதிற்றுப்பத்தந்தாதி)(Editor), 2016

=== Other works ===
- Tamil in three letters (Tamil: மூன்றே எழுத்தில் தமிழ்) (Vaishmathi Publications, Thanjavur), 2004
- Dr Kudavayil Balasubramanian (Tamil: முனைவர் குடவாயில் பாலசுப்பிரமணியன்), Department of Tamilology, Annamalai University and Indology Department, Malaya University, (Kalaigan Publishers, Madras), 2015
- Pandit Asalambikai Ammayar (Tamil: பண்டிதை அசலாம்பிகை அம்மையார்), Department of Tamilology, Annamalai University and Indology Department, Malaya University, (Kalaigan Publishers, Madras), 2016

== Manuscriptology workshop ==
He was the co-ordinator for the conduct of a workshop on Manuscriptology.

== Findings ==
- Found Chola era well in Vettar (சோழர் காலத்து உறை கிணறு வெட்டாற்றில் கண்டுபிடிப்பு)
- Found Chola era Amman and Sivalinga in Onbattuveli (ஒன்பத்துவேலியில் சோழர் கால அம்மன், சிவலிங்கம் சிலைகள்) Dinamani, Tamil daily, 1 February 2014
- Chola period sculptures near Thanjavur (தஞ்சாவூர் அருகே சோழர் கால சிலைகள்) Dinamani, Tamil daily, 10 January 2014
- Chola period sculpture found (சோழர் கால சிற்பம் கண்டெடுப்பு) Dinamalar, Tamil daily, 18 April 2013
- 9th century sculptures found near Thanjavur, The New Indian Express, 16 April 2013
- Chola period Nandhi found in Thanjavur (தஞ்சையில் சோழர் கால நந்தி சிற்பம் கண்டெடுப்பு) Dinamalar, Tamil daily, 31 January 2013
- 1000 year old Chola era sculptures found Dinamalar, Tamil daily, 24 January 2013
- Chola period Nandhi found in dilapidated temple (சிதைந்த கோவிலில் சோழர் கால நந்தி சிலை), தினமலர், 3 September 2012
