= Mairi, Bahia =

Municipality of Bahia, Brazil

Coordinates: 11°43′S 40°08′W

Mairi
- Municipality
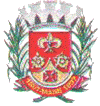
- Flag Coat of arms
- Interactive map of Mairi
- Country: Brazil
- Region: Nordeste
- State: Bahia

Population (2020)
  - Total: 18,602
- Time zone: UTC−3 (BRT)

Mairi is a municipality in the state of Bahia in the North-East region of Brazil.

== See also ==
- List of municipalities in Bahia
