= Máire =

Máire (Irish: [ˈmˠaːɾʲə]) is a feminine given name. It is the Irish language form of Maria, which was in turn a Latin form of the Greek names Μαριαμ (Mariam), and Μαρια (Maria), found in the New Testament. Both New Testament names were forms of the Hebrew name מִרְיָם (Miryam).

Its meaning has been variously translated with around 70 possibilities, including "sea of ", "star of the sea", "drop of the sea", "rebelliousness", "exalted one", "beloved", and "wished for child". Patrick Woulfe (1923) thought that the meaning related to bitterness, related to grief, sorrow, affliction, possibly associated with childbirth, was most likely.

Máire was and still is a popular name in Ireland, and is sometimes spelt in its anglicised forms Maire, (without diacritics) Maura and Moira. The diminutive form Máirín has inspired the Anglicised Maureen. Woulfe, writing in 1923, said that a quarter of Irish women at the name were called Mary, and ordinarily known as Máire. He said that Mary / Máire was not often used in Ireland as a name before the seventeenth century.

Unrelated to the Irish name, Maire (pron. MIE-reh) is a feminine given name in Finland, said to derive from the Finnish word mairea, meaning "gushing" or "sugary".

== Religious exception ==
In Ireland, the variant spelling Muire is used exclusively for the Blessed Virgin Mary mother of Jesus Christ. The name Máel Muire, used by both men and women, denotes "Servant of Mary".

== People with the given name ==
- Maire Aunaste (born 1953), an Estonian journalist
- Máire Breathnach, an Irish actress
- Máire Breatnach, an Irish fiddle player
- Máire Comerford (1892–1982), an Irish republican
- Máire Delaney (1945–2002), Irish doctor
- Máire Devine (born 1972), Irish politician
- Máire Drumm (1919–1976), the vice president of Sinn Féin and a commander in Cumann na mBan
- Máire Geoghegan-Quinn (born 1950), an Irish politician
- Máire Gill (1891–1977), a political activist
- Maire Gullichsen (1907–1990), Finnish art collector and patronage
- Máire Hendron, Northern Irish politician
- Máire Herbert, Irish historian
- Máire Hoctor (born 1963), a former Irish Fianna Fáil politician
- Máire Lynch (fl. 1547), a member of the Tribes of Galway
- Máire MacNeill (1904–1987), an Irish journalist, folklorist and translator
- Máire McDonnell-Garvey (1927–2009), traditional Irish musician and writer
- Máire Mhac an tSaoi (1922–2021), an Irish language scholar, poet, writer and academic
- Máire Mulcahy (1937–2023), Irish zoologist and ecologist
- Máire Mullarney (1921–2008), an Irish environmentalist, educationalist and Esperanto advocate
- Máire Nic an Bhaird (born 1982), a secondary school teacher and Irish language activist
- Máire Ní Bhraonáin (1952–2026) or Moya Brennan, an Irish folk singer, songwriter, and harpist
- Máire Ní Chathasaigh (born 1956), an Irish harpist and singer
- Máire Ní Chinnéide (1879–1967), an Irish language activist, playwright and first President of the Camogie Association
- Máire Ní Ghuairim (1896–1964), an Irish teacher, author and Sean-nós singer
- Máire Nic Shiubhlaigh (1883–1958), Irish actress
- Máire Rua O'Brien (1615–1686), Irish aristocrat
- Máire O'Neill (1885–1952), an Irish actress of stage and film
- Máire O'Neill (academic) (born 1978), an Irish data encryption academic
- Máire Wyse Power (1887–1916), Irish Celtic scholar
- Máire Uí Dhroigneáin, an Irish actress
- Máire Whelan, an Irish barrister and senior counsel

== Other uses ==
- Máire was the pen name of the Irish author Séamus Ó Grianna

== See also ==
- List of Irish-language given names
- Mairi (disambiguation), includes the given name Màiri, the Scottish Gaelic form of Mary
- Máiréad, the Irish language form of Margaret (Mairead in Scottish Gaelic)
