= Mhairi McFarlane =

Scottish romantic comedy novelist

- Born: 1976 (age 49–50)
- Occupations: Novelist; writer
- Writing career
- Language: English
- Genres: Romantic comedy; contemporary fiction
- Website: mhairimcfarlane.com

Mhairi McFarlane (Note: Pronounced [ˈvaːrɪ]) is a Scottish writer of romantic comedy fiction.

== Biography ==
Mhairi McFarlane was born in 1976 in Falkirk. She attended school in Nottingham and studied English at the University of Manchester. She worked as a journalist in Nottingham before becoming a novelist.

During her time as a journalist, she worked primarily on the Nottingham Post, and also contributed articles to The Guardian's TV and radio blog.

She left the Nottingham Post in 2007 and got her first book deal in 2011.

She has published twelve novels, all with HarperCollins.

She was part of the writers' room for series 5 of Slow Horses.

She lives in Sherwood, Nottingham.

== Reception ==
Her debut novel, You Had Me At Hello, became HarperCollins’ best ever selling ebook to that date. Lisa Jewell said it was "the funniest, most romantic book I've read since One Day." Marian Keyes said: "Very very witty and funny. Left me in awe [...] a total gem." You Had Me At Hello also won Best Contemporary Romantic Fiction in 2013 from the Romantic Novelists' Association Awards.

Of Here's Looking At You, The Irish Times said: "Mhairi McFarlane's characters shine with wit and insight." Of It's Not Me, It's You, Heat said: "This is modern and honest romantic fiction at its most accomplished." The Sunday Express wrote that it is "a delicious feast of comic romance." Of Don't You Forget About Me, Marian Keyes said: "So funny and warm. A delicious read." Jenny Colgan said: "Hilarious, warm and life affirming." Keyes called If I Never Met You "beautiful and touching." Beth O'Leary called Last Night "gorgeously romantic." Marian Keyes said it is "brilliant on relationships, friendships and emotions." Of Mad About You, Jenny Colgan said it is "gorgeous, funny, [and] life-affirming." Katie Fforde said: "Funny, poignant, full of insight [...] a triumph." Holly Bourne said that McFarlane "consistently writes flawless romantic comedies and Mad About You is no exception."

Between Us was listed as a Sunday Times Best Book of 2023. Jojo Moyes said it is "everything you want from a rom com and satisfyingly knotty with proper, recognisable characters." Louise O'Neill said: "I love Mhairi McFarlane’s books and this was no exception [...] it’s clever and engrossing and sharp." Lindsey Kelk said: "So clever, so heartfelt and so unbelievably funny, Between Us is a perfect book."

Lindsey Kelk has called her "easily one of the best writers working today" and Stylist magazine called her "the absolute queen of romantic comedies that belie a darker core."

== Works ==
- You Had Me At Hello (2012)
- Here's Looking At You (2013)
- It's Not Me It's You (2014)
- Who's That Girl (2015)
- After Hello (2017)
- Don't You Forget About Me (2019)
- If I Never Met You (2020)
- Last Night (2021)
- Mad About You (2022)
- Between Us (2023)
- You Belong With Me (2024)
- Cover Story (2025)
