= Shankarpur (community development block) =

Community development block in Madhepura district, Bihar, India

Shankarpur शंकरपुर सामुदायिक विकास खंड
- Community development block
- Location in Bihar, India
- Coordinates: 26°01′52″N 86°51′54″E
- Country: India
- State: Bihar
- Region: Mithila
- District: Madhepura

Population (2001)
  - Total: 82,519

Languages
  - Official: Maithili, Hindi
- Time zone: UTC+5:30 (IST)
- Lok Sabha constituency: Madhepura
- Vidhan Sabha constituency: Singheshwar
- Website: madhepura.bih.nic.in

Shankarpur is one of the administrative divisions of Madhepura district in the Indian state of Bihar. The block headquarters are located at a distance of 13 km from the district headquarters, namely, Madhepura.

== Geography ==
Shankarpur is located at 26°01′52″N 86°51′54″E.

=== Panchayats ===
Panchayats in Shankarpur community development block are: Maura Kabiahi, Maura Jharkaha, Parsha, Rampur Lahi, Gidhdha, Behrari, Sonbarsha, Jirwa Madheli and Raibhir.

== Demographics ==
In the 2001 census Shankarpur Block had a population of 82,519.
