= Maras (surname) =

Maras is a surname. Notable people with the surname include:

- Alen Maras (born 1982), Croatian footballer
- Anthony Maras, Australian filmmaker
- Čedo Maras (born 1959), Yugoslav goalkeeper
- Gordan Maras (born 1974), Croatian politician
- Mate Maras (born 1939), Croatian translator
- Robert Maras (born 1978), German basketball player
- Tommy Maras (born 1967), Australian footballer
- Vlasios Maras (born 1983), Greek gymnast
- Vukashin Maras (born 1938 died 2008), Montenegrin politician and Minister of Interior of Montenegro
