= Mauro =

Mauro may refer to:

- Mauro (given name)
- Mauro (surname)
- A favela (slum) in São Paulo, Brazil

== See also ==
- Maura (disambiguation)
- Maurus (disambiguation)
