= Maras, Peru =

Maras San Francisco de Maras
- Town
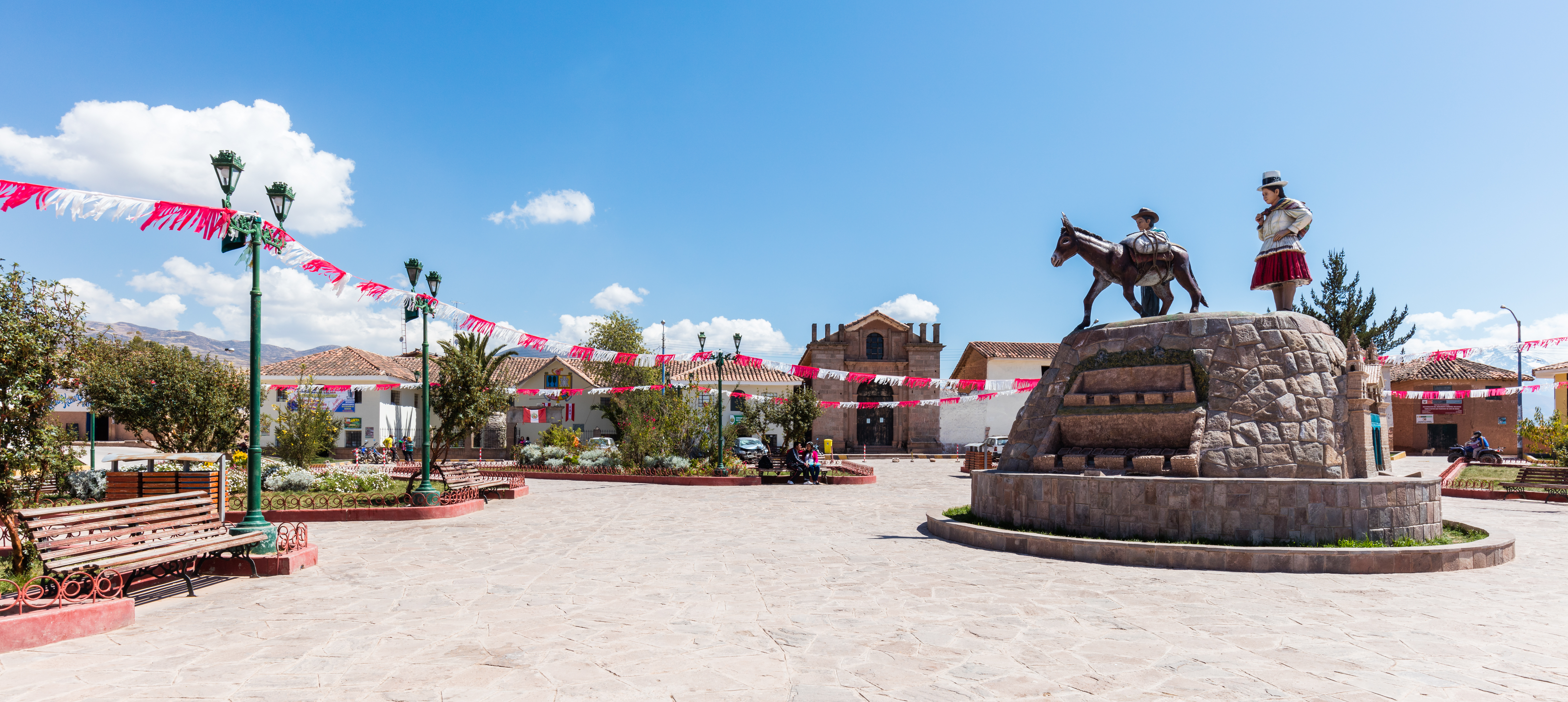
- View of the Main Square of Maras.

- Location in Peru
- Coordinates: 13°20′08″S 72°09′25″W
- Country: Peru
- Region: Cusco
- Province: Urubamba
- District: Maras
- Elevation: 3,300 m (10,800 ft)

Population (2005)
  - Total: 1,730
- Demonym(s): Mareño, -ña
- Time zone: UTC-5 (PET)

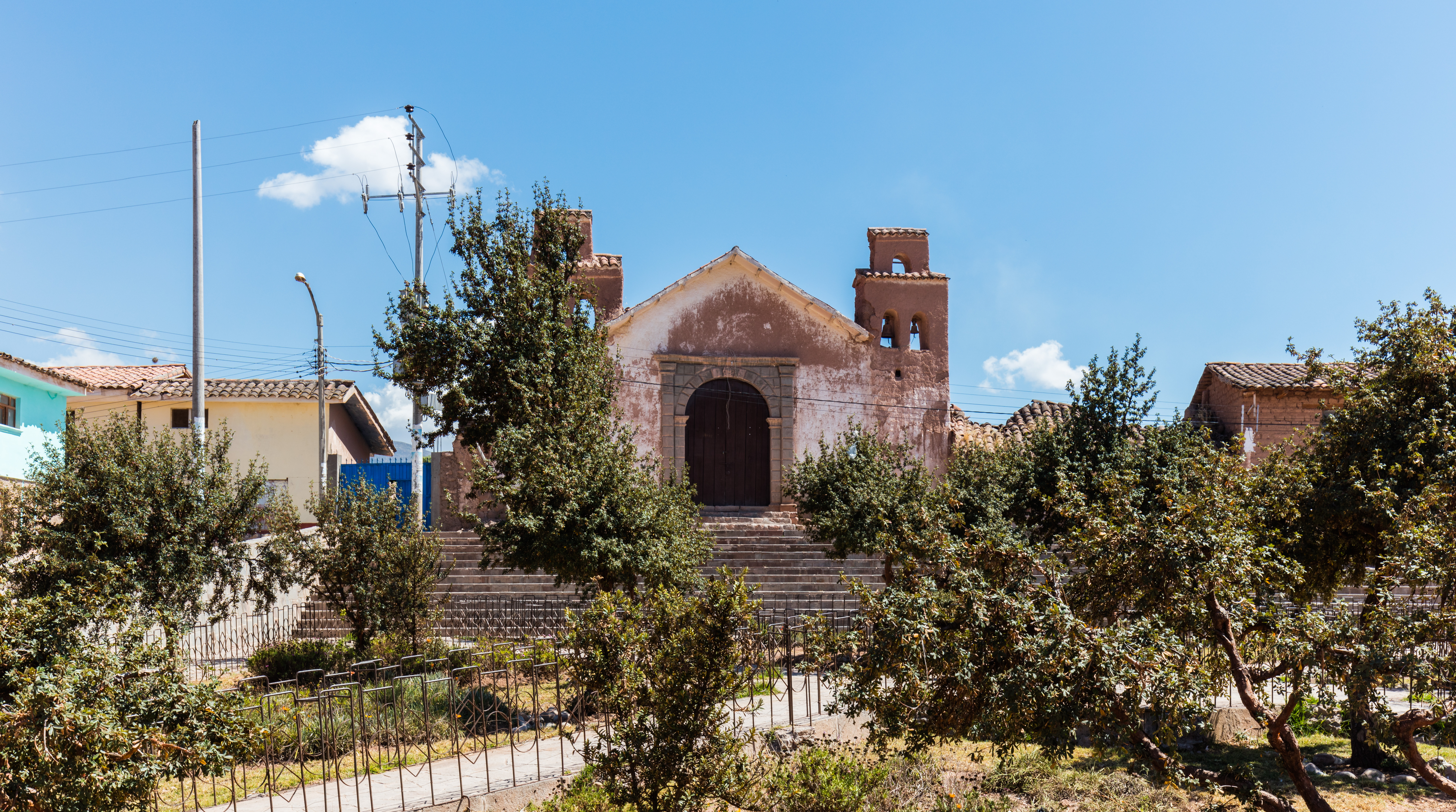
Main square of the town of Maras.

Maras is a town in the Sacred Valley of the Incas, 40 kilometers north of Cusco, in the Cusco Region of Peru. The town, in the eponymous district, is well known for its salt evaporation ponds, located towards Urubamba from the town center, which have been in use since Inca times. The salt-evaporation ponds are four kilometers north of the town, down a canyon that descends to the Rio Vilcanota (as the upper Urubamba River is known) and the Sacred Valley of the Incas. There are over 5,000 salt ponds, some owned by families and others unused.

== Location and features ==
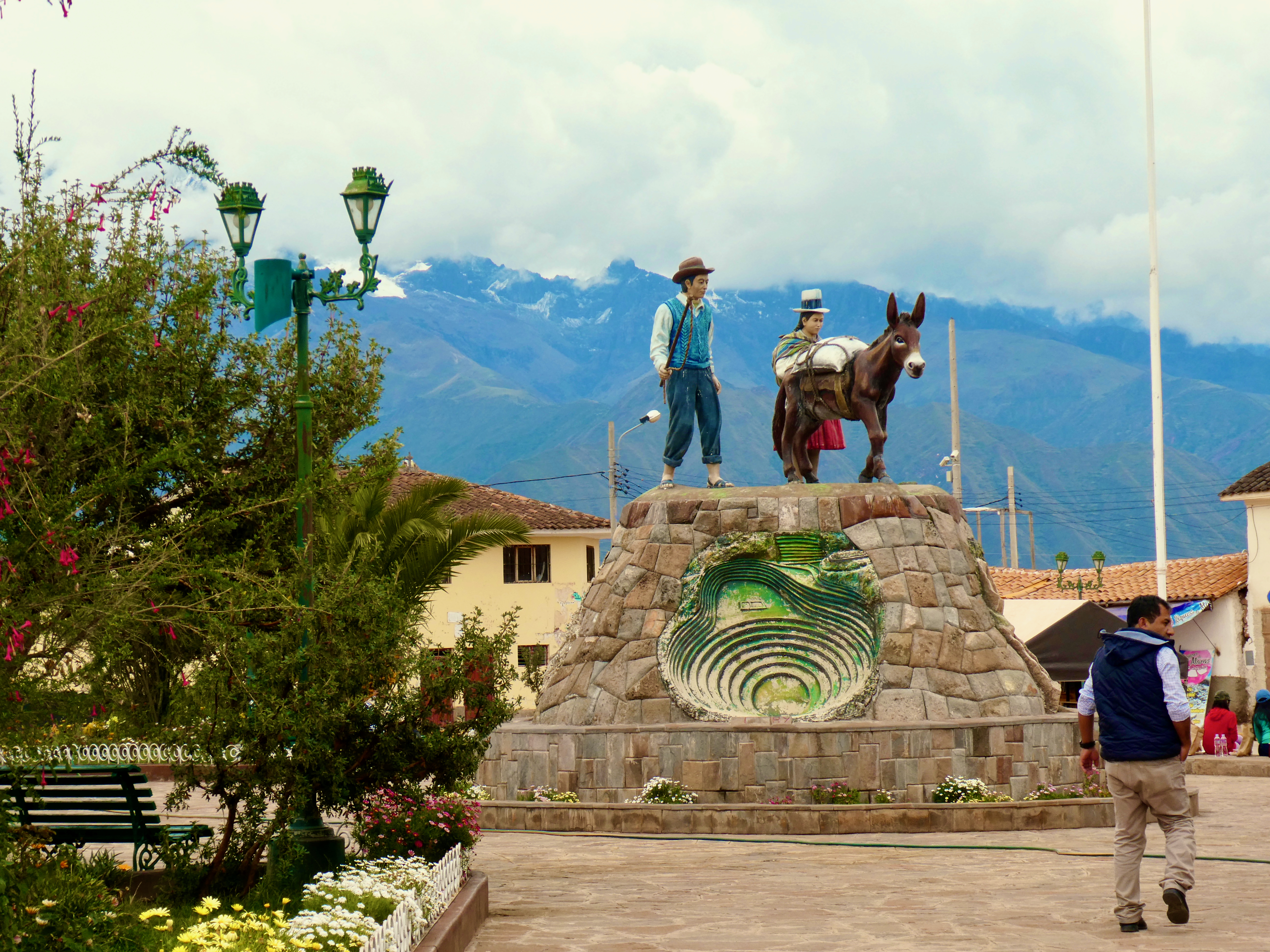
Monument in the main square of Maras

The Maras area is accessible by a paved road, which leads from the main road leading through the Sacred Valley between Cuzco and the surrounding towns. Tourist sites in the area include the colonial church, the nearby Moray Inca ruins, the local salt evaporation ponds, and the surrounding scenery.

=== Salt ponds ===
Since Incan times, salt has been obtained in Maras by evaporating salty water from a local subterranean stream. The highly salty water emerges at a spring, a natural outlet of the underground stream. The flow is directed into an intricate system of tiny channels constructed so that the water runs gradually down onto the several hundred ancient terraced ponds. Almost all the ponds are less than four meters square in area, and none exceeds thirty centimeters in depth. All are necessarily shaped into polygons with the flow of water carefully controlled and monitored by the workers. The elevation of the ponds slowly decreases, so that the water may flow through the myriad branches of the water-supply channels and be introduced slowly through a notch in one sidewall of each pond. The proper maintenance of the adjacent feeder channel, the side walls and the water-entry notch, the pond's bottom surface, the quantity of water, and the removal of accumulated salt deposits requires close cooperation among the community of users. It is agreed among local residents and pond workers that the cooperative system was established during the time of the Incas. As water evaporates from the sun-warmed ponds, the water becomes supersaturated and salt precipitates as various size crystals onto the inner surfaces of a pond's earthen walls and on the pond's earthen floor. The pond's keeper then closes the water-feeder notch and allows the pond to go dry. Within a few days the water has evaporated and salt remains. This process is repeated for about a month building up salt over time. Once enough salt has built up the keeper carefully scrapes the dry salt from the sides and bottom in layers. The first layer is typically pink or white and is the highest quality, it is used as kitchen (table) salt. The second layer is known as bulk salt and is a lower quality than the first layer, it is usually white. The third layer is typically brown and is used as industrial salt. Some salt is sold at a gift store nearby.

The salt mines traditionally have been available to any person wishing to harvest salt. The owners of the salt ponds must be members of the community, and families that are new to the community wishing to manage a salt pond get the one farthest from the community. The size of the salt pond assigned to a family depends on the family's size. Usually there are many unused salt pools available to be farmed. Any prospective salt farmer need only locate an empty currently unmaintained pond, consult with the local informal cooperative, learn how to keep a pond properly within the accepted communal system, and start working.

As of September 2019, MaraSal S.A., the company that owns the salt pans, announced that tourists are no longer allowed to walk around the salt ponds due to contamination.

== Notable residents ==
- Antonio Sinchi Roca Inka, 17th-century Quechua painter
