= Meredith Maran =

American author, book critic, and journalist

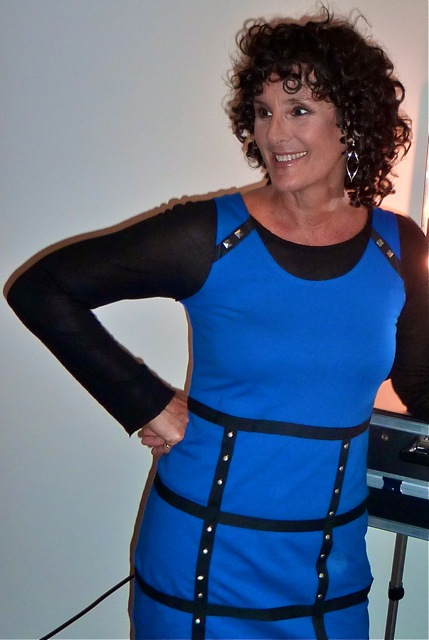
- Born: August 21, 1951 (age 75); New York City, U.S.
- Education: Bronx High School of Science
- Occupations: Journalist, novelist
- Children: Peter Graham, Jesse Graham
- Writing career
- Period: 1957–present
- Genres: Memoir, Nonfiction, fiction
- Notable work: Why We Write/Why We Write About Ourselves
- Website: www.meredithmaran.com

Meredith Maran (born August 21, 1951) is an American author, book critic, and journalist. She has published twelve nonfiction books, several of them San Francisco Chronicle best-sellers, and a successful first novel. She writes features, essays, and reviews for People, More, Good Housekeeping, Salon.com, The Chicago Tribune, The Los Angeles Times the San Francisco Chronicle, and the Boston Globe.

== Biography ==
Maran published her first national magazine article at age 15 and her first book at age 19. After a brief stint in Silicon Valley, she became Editor of the Banana Republic Magalog, then created award-winning socially responsible marketing campaigns for Ben & Jerry's, Working Assets, Stonyfield Farm, Smith & Hawken, and Odwalla.

Maran's storytelling is regarded as colorful, compelling, sympathetic, and evocative. Her memoir, My Lie, has been described as a persuasive, compelling critique of media and psychology. Her first novel, A Theory of Small Earthquakes, was praised by Anne Lamott as "A smart, sexy, funny, wrenching, delicious story of lust and trust and love and family."

== Writing career ==
Maran's first memoir, Chamisa Road, was published in 1971 by Random House. Her second book, How Would You Feel If Your Dad Was Gay?, was published in 1991 by Alyson Press. The book is a children's book about gay/lesbian issues.

What It's Like To Live Now was published in 1995 by Bantam. It captures the contradictions and ambiguities of the modern American experience. Maran's fourth book, coauthored with Ben Cohen and Jerry Greenfield, Ben & Jerry's Double Dip, was published in 1997 by Simon & Schuster. What It's Like To Live Now became a Bay Area Bestseller. Ben & Jerry's Double Dip became a national bestseller.

Notes From An Incomplete Revolution was published in 1997 by Bantam. The book is written in first-person, the narrator acknowledging the limitations and failings of feminism while still rejoicing in the power of the women's movement.

Maran's book Class Dismissed, published by St. Martin's Press in 2000, presents an account of the realities of public education via a year in the lives of three high-school seniors from Berkeley High. Class Dismissed was praised by critics and spent 15 weeks on the San Francisco Chronicle bestseller list.

Dirty, which explores the causes and consequences of America's teenage drug epidemic, was published in 2003, by HarperSanFrancisco. According to Psychology Today:

Dirty is eye-opening and compassionately delivered...a sympathetic evocation of ecstasy, heartbreak, horror, and hope. Provocatively revealing, informative, and not without humor, Dirty is itself an addictive read.

My Lie, published in 2010 by John Wiley & Sons, is a memoir that recounts the fallout from Maran's false accusation that her father sexually abused her as a child. Throughout the memoir, Maran touches on themes such as false memory, the sex-abuse panic spread across the U.S. during the 1980s and 1990s, and coming to terms with taking responsibility for her actions. The memoir provokes dialogue about compassion for the sexually abused and the falsely imprisoned as sexual abusers. Maran is especially credible because of the number of years she spent working in the child-abuse prevention area. According to the National Center for Reason and Justice:

It's about time someone such as [Meredith Maran] wrote a book like [My Lie]. I urge anyone interested in late 20th century culture, gender conflicts, social influence, and human suggestibility to read My Lie.

My Lie was named a San Francisco Chronicle "Best Book of 2010," and San Francisco Chronicle "Notable New Book".

Why We Write was published in 2013 by Plume and edited by Maran. In the book, twenty of America's bestselling authors, including David Baldacci, Jennifer Egan, Terry McMillan, Jodi Picoult, and James Frey, share tricks, tips, and secrets of the successful writing life. According to the Boston Globe:

Why We Write is filled with practical tips on writing, surviving, and thriving for anyone who works with words.

The follow-up to Why We Write, "Why We Write About Ourselves," was published in January 2016 by Plume.

"The New Old Me: My Late-Life Invention," was published in March 2017 by Blue Rider Press/Penguin Random House. In the Washington Post, Elinor Lipman wrote, "Well-written and smart...It is lovely to see Los Angeles through the author's eyes...Her friends are bricks, her boundaries are porous, and her heart is big. When she muses, "Maybe I've accidentally come to exactly the right place," we reader-companions vote yes."

From 2004-2006 Maran was Writer in Residence at UCLA. In 2006 she was Writer in Residence at the Mabel Dodge Luhan House in Taos.

In an interview with TIME.com, Maran explained how and why she decided to write her memoir, My Lie. She explained that in 2007, a hiking acquaintance had asked if she had ever done anything she still regretted. Maran replied that she had accused her father of molesting her, and hadn't spoken to him for eight years. Maran [later] realized that the accusation wasn't true. Maran's hiking acquaintance said that exactly the same thing had happened to her. That prompted Maran to address the examples and abuses that included false accounts—and the pain and suffering inflicted on people who were innocent like her father—in order to answer the question: "How could it happen that people who never suffered such harrowing experiences would come to believe that they had?"

== Bibliography ==
=== Books ===
- Chamisa Road (1970)
- How Would You Feel If Your Dad Was Gay? (1991)
- What It's Like To Live Now (1995)
- Ben & Jerry's Double Dip (1997)
- Notes From An Incomplete Revolution (1997)
- Class Dismissed: A Year In The Life of an American High School (2000)
- Enough About You (2003)
- Dirty: A Search for Answers Inside America's Teenage Drug Epidemic (2003)
- 50 Ways To Support Lesbian and Gay Equality (2005)
- My Lie: A True Story of False Memory (2010)
- A Theory of Small Earthquakes (2012)
- Why We Write: Twenty Acclaimed Authors on What Gets Them Started and Keeps Them Going (2013)
- Why We Write About Ourselves: Twenty Memoirists On Why They Expose Themselves (and Others) in the Name of Literature (2016)
- "The New Old Me: My Late-Life Reinvention" (2017)

=== Anthologies ===
- Travelers' Tales San Francisco (1996)
- Women on the Verge (1999)
- I Do, I Don't (Queers on Marriage) (2004)
- Roar Softly and Carry a Great Lipstick (2004)
- Why I'm Still Married (2006)
- About Face: Women Write About What They See When They Look In The Mirror (2008)
- Dirty Words (A Literary Encyclopedia of Sex) (2008)
- Behind The Bedroom Door (2008)
- One Big Happy Family (2009)
- Are We Born Racist? (2010)
- The Compassionate Instinct (2010)
- Dear John, I Love Jane (2010)
