= Maurus =

Maurus is a Latin given name. It can refer to:

== Persons ==
Saints

- Saint Maurus of Parentium (3rd century), the first bishop of Parentium and the patron saint of Poreč
- Saint Maurus (c. 500 - c. 584), the first disciple of St. Benedict of Nursia
- Blessed Maurus Magnentius Rabanus (Hrabanus) (c. 776 (784?) - 856)
- Saint Maurus of Pécs, the second bishop of Pécs, and abbey of Pannonhalma (c. 1000-c. 1075)

Others

- Servius the Grammarian, commentator on Vergil sometimes called Maurus Servius in medieval manuscripts
- Maurus (bishop of Csanád), 11th-century Hungarian friar
- Manfred Maurus (died 2008), German scientist
- Maurus of Salerno (c.1130 - 1214), medical writer and teacher
- Mister Maurus, an archetypical school teacher developed by Anton Hansen Tammsaare
- Sylvester Maurus (1619-1687), Italian Jesuit theologian
- Kuber (Maurus the Kuber), brother to Tervel's father Asparukh and son of Kubrat Kaghan of Patria Onoguria
- Maurus, religious name of secret agent monk Alexander Horn

== Other uses ==
- The inhabitants of Mauretania, ancient kingdom and late Roman province
- Maurus vogelii, a species of gossamer-winged butterflies

== See also ==
- Mauro (disambiguation)
- Maura (disambiguation)
- Mauritius (given name)
- San Mauro (disambiguation)
