= Māra =

Goddess in Baltic mythology

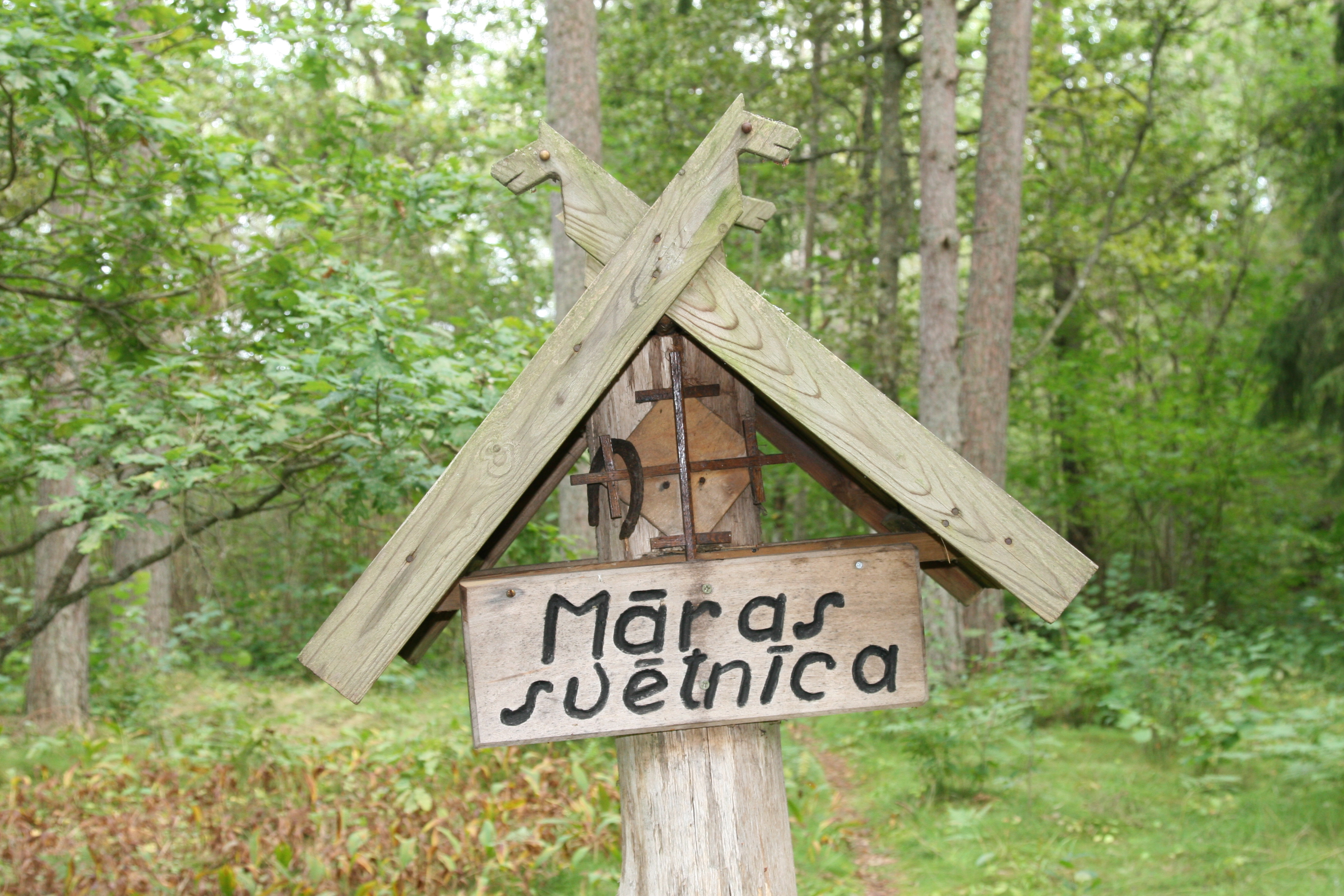
The Cross of Māra seen on a sign at the Maznodupju Stone Load (Māra's Sanctuary) in South Kurzeme Municipality

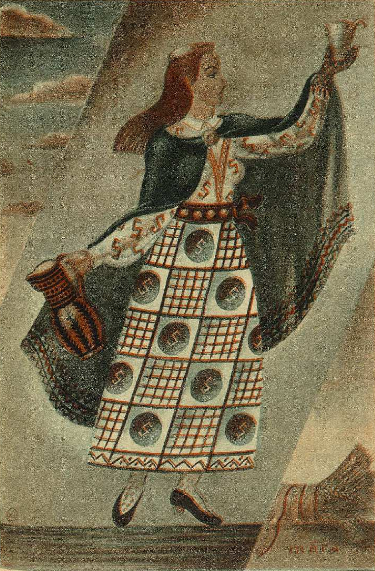
"Māra", a wall painting by Latvian artist Ansis Cīrulis, around 1938

Māra is the highest-ranking goddess in Latvian mythology, the ancient Dawn-goddess, previously called Austra, and, not at all, although often stated, the same as Zemes māte (Mother Earth, pace).

== Names ==
Alternative names: Māre, Mārīte (diminutive), Mārša, Māršava (Western Latvia).

== Description ==
She is the patroness of all feminine duties (children, cattle), patroness of all the economic activities ("God made the table, Māra made the bread"), even money and markets. Being the alternate side of Dievs, she takes a person's body after their death while Dievs is taking the soul. She is the goddess of the land, which is called Māras zeme ('Māra's land'). She is called 'Mother of Cows' (Govu māte), the same way the Vedic Dawn-goddess is called gávām mātár- 'id'.

In western Latvia, and to a lesser degree in the rest of Latvia, she was strongly associated with Laima, and may have been considered the same deity.

== Festivals ==
The festival Māras was held in her honor every August 15. This is probably a result of Christian influence and identification of Māra with Mary, whose main festival (the Assumption) has fallen on the same date since early times. Opinions are divided over whether Māra is a pre-Christian deity, or originated as a reflection of the Christian Mary created by semi-Christian Livonian peasants.

== See also ==
- Morana (goddess)
- Mara (disambiguation)
- Mare (folklore)
- Marah (Bible)
- Mokosh
- Semele
- Eos
- Aurora (mythology)
- Ēostre
- Freyja
- Bendis
- Mara (demon), a "demon" of the Buddhist cosmology
- Hausos
- Žemyna
