= Maura (given name) =

Maura is a female given name primarily used in English, Spanish, Italian, Greek, Scots Gaelic, and Irish. In Romance languages it appears as the feminine form of the Roman given name Maurus. In Gaelic languages it may be an Anglicisation of Máire, the Irish form of Mary.

In the U.S., this name peaked in popularity in 1964 as the 469th most popular name for girls born that year, and remained in the top 1000 names until 2007.

== People with first name Maura ==
- Saint Moura, a martyr during the Diocletian Persecution and the wife of Timothy the Reader
- Saint Maura of Ireland, a martyred companion of Britta
- Saint Maura of Troyes, a noble French virgin
- Maura Clarke, American nun and missionary
- Maura D. Corrigan, justice of the Michigan Supreme Court
- Maura Davis, American musician
- Maura Hagan, American physicist
- Maura Hanrahan, Canadian author
- Maura Harty, United States Assistant Secretary of State for the Bureau of Consular Affairs
- Maura Healey, Governor of Massachusetts
- Maura Higgins (born 1990), Irish television personality, television presenter and model
- Maura Johnston, American music critic and blogger
- Maura Judkis, American journalist
- Maura Kennedy, musician in American folk-rock duo The Kennedys
- Maura Mast, Irish-American mathematician
- Maura McNiel (1921–2020), American feminist activist
- Maura Murphy, Irish author
- Maura Murray, college student who went missing Feb. 9, 2004
- Maura O'Connell, Irish singer
- Maura Tierney (born 1965), American film and television actress
- Maura Tombelli, Italian astronomer
- Maura Viceconte, Italian long-distance runner
- Maura West (born 1972), American actress

== Fictional characters ==
- Maura Glee, fictional character in the webcomic Diesel Sweeties
- Maura Isles, a main character of Rizzoli & Isles and the novels by Tess Gerritsen on which the series is based.
- Maura Labingi or Frodo Baggins, a character in The Lord of the Rings
- Maura Pfefferman, née Mort Pfefferman – Jeffrey Tambor's character on Transparent.
- Maura Ellis, Amy Poehler's character in the 2015 film Sisters.
- Maura Sargent, a character in the Raven Cycle series by Maggie Stiefvater
- Maura Henriette Franklin/Singleton, a character in the 2022 series 1899.

== See also ==
- Santa or St Maura, a former name of the Greek island of Lefkada
