= Mara Sapon-Shevin =

American academic

Mara Sapon-Shevin is a professor of inclusive education at Syracuse University.

She is a critic of gifted education and turned down an offer of a place for her daughter in a gifted education program on the grounds that "I would never have wanted to raise a child who thought that she was better or smarter than other people". She is also an advocate against bullying, especially bullying against perceived or actual members of the LGBT community.

== Books ==
- Playing Favorites: Gifted Education and the Disruption of Community, ISBN 0-7914-1980-0
- Because We Can Change the World: A Practical Guide To Building Cooperative, Inclusive Classroom Communities, ISBN 0-205-17489-2
- Widening the Circle : The Power of Inclusive Classrooms, ISBN 0-8070-3280-8

== See also ==
- Teaching for social justice
