= John Morris =

John Morris may refer to:

== Art and culture ==
- John Morris (piper) (fl. 1870s), Irish piper
- John Morris (composer) (1926–2018), film composer often employed by Mel Brooks
- John Chester Brooks Morris or Chester Morris (1901–1970), American actor
- John Morris (Australian actor) (born 1963), Australian television actor
- John Morris (voice actor) (born 1984), American voice actor
- John G. Morris (1916–2017), picture editor
- John Meirion Morris (1936–2020), Welsh sculptor
- John Morris (sculptor) (born 1963), English sculptor
- John Morris (filmmaker) (born 1983), American film screenwriter and producer

== Military ==
- John Morris (soldier) (1617–1649), English army officer
- John W. Morris (1921–2013), U.S. Army general
- John Morris (Medal of Honor) (1855–?), United States Marine Corps corporal who received the Medal of Honor
- John Ignatius Morris (1842–1902), Royal Marines officer
- John Thomas Morris (1931–2015), British Army soldier
- John Morris (activity 1663–1672), (see below), British pirate and privateer with Henry Morgan

== Politics and law ==
- John Morris, Baron Morris of Aberavon (1931–2023), British politician, former Attorney-General
- John Morris (Australian politician) (1936–2013), Australian senator
- John Morris (Conservative politician) (1894–1962), British MP for Salford North, 1931–1945
- John Morris, Baron Morris of Borth-y-Gest (1896–1979), British law lord
- John Morris (judge) (1902–1956), Australian jurist
- John Carnac Morris (1798–1858), English civil servant of the East India Company
- J. H. C. Morris (John Humphrey Carlile Morris, 1910–1984), academic lawyer
- John Henry Morris (1828–1912), administrator in British India
- John Morris (FBI) (born 1947), Federal Bureau of Investigation special agent

== Religion ==
- John Morris (Hebraist) (1595–1648), Regius Professor of Hebrew at Oxford University (1626)
- John Morris (bishop) (1866–1946), American prelate of the Roman Catholic Church
- John Brande Morris (1812–1886), English Anglican theologian, later a Roman Catholic priest
- John Edward Morris (1889–1987), American Roman Catholic priest
- John Gottlieb Morris (1803–1895), American Lutheran minister and entomologist
- John Hughes Morris (1870–1953), English Presbyterian minister, editors and writer
- John Morris (Jesuit) (1826–1893), English Jesuit and historical writer
- John Moses Morris (1837–1873), American minister and author
- John D. Morris (1946–2023), Christian creationist

== Sports ==
=== Baseball ===
- John Morris (pitcher) (1941–2025), American professional baseball pitcher
- John Harold Goodwin Morris or Yellowhorse Morris (1902–1959), American baseball pitcher
- John Morris (outfielder) (born 1961), American baseball player

=== Cricket ===
- John Morris (Australian cricketer) (1831–1921), Australian cricketer
- John Morris (cricketer, born 1880) (1880–1960), English cricketer
- John Morris (New Zealand cricketer) (1933–1970), New Zealand cricketer
- John Morris (South African cricketer) (1940–2011), South African cricketer
- John Morris (cricketer, born 1964), English cricketer

=== Other sports ===
- John Morris (footballer, born 1873) (1873–?), Chirk F.C. and Wales international footballer
- John Morris (bowls), former lawn bowls competitor for New Zealand
- John Morris (New Zealand footballer) (born 1950), New Zealand international footballer
- John Morris (curler) (born 1978), Canadian curler
- John Morris (rugby league) (born 1980), Australian rugby league coach

== Others ==
- John Albert Morris (1836–1895), American businessman
- John Morris (physician) (1759–1793), American physician
- Sir John Morris, 1st Baronet (1745–1819), Welsh industrialist
- John Morris (geologist) (1810–1886), geologist
- John McLean Morris (1911–1993), American gynecologist
- John P. Morris (1926–2002), American trade union leader
- John Morris (historian) (1913–1977), English historian
- John Morris (anthropologist) (1895–1980), British mountaineer and journalist
- John Morris (pirate) (fl. 1663–1672), English buccaneer
- John Morris, a character in the video game series Castlevania
- John Morris and Sons Salford, manufacturers of all kinds of fire fighting equipment

== See also ==
- Johnny Morris (disambiguation)
- Jack Morris (disambiguation)
- John Maurice, Prince of Nassau-Siegen (1604–1679), count and (from 1674) prince of Nassau-Siegen
- John Morris-Jones (1864–1929), Welsh grammarian, academic and poet
- Jon Morris (1942–2026), American football player
- Jon Morris (ice hockey) (born 1966), American ice hockey player
- John Morice (disambiguation)
- Jonathan Morris (disambiguation)
- Morris (surname)
