= Camlock =

Camlock or cam lock may refer to:

- Camlock (climbing), designed to wedge between rock surfaces
- Camlock (electrical), often used in temporary electrical power production and distribution in North America
- Camlock (fluid fitting), a type of hose coupling
- Cam lock (latch)
  - Cam fastener, a two-part fastener often used in flat-pack furniture that incorporates a cam lock latch
