= Chicago fitting =

A Chicago fitting (also called a Duck's foot fitting due to its shape) is a one quarter turn fitting or hose coupling used for attaching hoses or piping together. Chicago fittings are used on both low to medium pressure gas and fluid lines. The advantages of the Chicago fitting are that they can be used in a wide range of industries and that there are no male or female fitting; both fittings are identical. A Chicago fitting is also known as an Air King coupling.

== See also ==
- Gladhand connector
- Hose Coupling
