= John M. Morris =

John M. Morris may refer to:

- John McLean Morris (1911–1993), American gynecologist, surgeon and researcher
- John Moses Morris (1837–1873), American minister and author
