= John Morice =

John Morice or John Morrice may refer to:

- John Morice (died 1362), Lord Chancellor of Ireland
- John Morice (1568–1618), MP for Appleby (UK Parliament constituency)
- John Morice (1630–1705), MP for Newport (Cornwall) (UK Parliament constituency)
- John Morrice (1811–1875), New South Wales politician

== See also ==
- John Morris (disambiguation)
