= Johnny Morris =

Johnny or Johnnie Morris may refer to:

- Johnnie Morris (actor) (1887–1969), American comedian and actor
- Johnny Morris (television presenter) (1916–1999), British television presenter
- Johnny Morris (footballer) (1923–2011), English footballer
- Johnny Morris (American football) (born 1935), American football player
- Johnny Morris (businessman) (born 1948), American businessman
- Johnnie E. Morris-Tatum (born 1951), American politician from Milwaukee, also known as Johnnie Morris

== See also ==
- Jonathan Morris (disambiguation)
- John Morris (disambiguation)
