= Mother Mary Loyola =

English Roman Catholic nun and book author (1845–1930)

Mother Mary Loyola IBVM

Personal life
- Born: June 30, 1845 Islington, Middlesex, England
- Died: December 18, 1930 (aged 85) Micklegate Bar, York, England

Religious life
- Religion: Roman Catholic

Mother Mary Loyola (1845–1930) was an English Roman Catholic nun and an author of bestselling Catholic books. James Fallon SJ, writing for the Jesuit magazine America in 1931, called her one of the "most prolific and popular" writers in the Catholic literary world. She published her first book in 1896 at age 51, and produced at least 27 more in the ensuing 30 years. Her works sold globally and were translated into many languages.

== Youth and entry into religious life ==
She was born Elizabeth Giles to Protestant parents, Jane Gray (1817–1855) and Albert Giles (1818–1855). Her parents were part of the Scots Christian sect of Sandemanianism, known as "Glasites." Her father was a grain dealer for the London stock exchange, and the family was affluent. She had five siblings. In 1855, when she was nine years old, two of her siblings and both of her parents died of scarlet fever. She and her remaining two siblings became the wards of their uncle Samuel Giles, a Catholic convert via the Oxford movement. The children attended mass with him and heard the sermons of Cardinal Manning and Father Faber. After entering the Catholic church, she was enrolled at the Bar Convent School in York, the oldest Catholic school in England, and also considered to be one of the best schools in the nation. After three years in secular life post-graduation, she entered the Bar Convent in 1866 at age 21 and became a religious sister of the Institute of the Blessed Virgin Mary, known as the Sisters of Loreto.

== Becoming an author, work with boys ==
She taught English for 30 years in the convent school, and served as headmistress and Mother Superior (1888–1891), and then mistress of novices (1891–1923), celebrating her golden jubilee in 1919. The English Jesuit and historian, John Morris, encouraged her to write a book for children preparing for first communion. English Jesuits published My First Communion by "A Religious of St. Mary's Convent, York" in 1896 as part of a popular "Quarterly Series." The editor was Herbert Thurston, a Jesuit who went on to edit many of her books and write introductions for them. My First Communion became popular enough that she was encouraged to publish it as a title under her name. She launched and ran a branch of the Catholic Boys Brigade in York for ten years, watching many of the boys go off to fight in World War I, with some not returning. She presented a paper, "First Communion," at the Eucharistic Congress which took place in Montreal, September 6–11, 1910. She also wrote the life of her congregation's founder, Mary Ward, for The Catholic Encyclopedia, of which Thurston was a noted editor and contributor. The English Catholic publisher Maisie Ward remembered being prepared for her confirmation at age 16 in 1905 with The Soldier of Christ, or, Talks Before Confirmation (1900), and she then spent time at the Bar Convent to study with Mother Loyola personally.

She slipped on a stairway in 1923; the accident ended her work as novice mistress and confined her to a wheelchair permanently. She was 78 years old and in considerable pain, yet she continued to write and publish. After her death in 1930, Joseph Cowgill, Bishop of Leeds, celebrated the requiem mass, and the Right Reverend Thomas Shine, Bishop of Middlesbrough, preached the homily. The choir of Ampleforth Abbey sang.

== Partial listing of books ==
1. My First Communion. (London: Burns and Oates, 1896). From The Irish Monthly, "Few Catholic books have been so successful as 'First Communion.'" Also Question on First Communion and Mass for First Communion (all 1896).
2. Confession and Communion (1898).
3. The Child of God, or What Comes of Our Baptism (London: Burns and Oates, 1899).
4. The Soldier of Christ, or, Talks Before Confirmation (London: Burns and Oates, 1900).
5. Coram Sanctissimo (London: Sands & Co., 1901).
6. Forgive Us Our Trespasses, or, Talks Before Confession (1901).
7. First Confession (1901), version for grownups.
8. First Confession: Book for Little Ones (1901).
9. A Simple Confession Book (1901).
10. A Simple Confirmation Book (1901).
11. A Simple Communion Book (1903).
12. Welcome! Holy Communion Before and After (London: Burns and Oates, 1904).
13. Credo: A Simple Explanation of Catholic Doctrine (1905).
14. Jesus of Nazareth: The Story of His Life Told to Children (London: Burnes & Oates, 1907).
15. Home for Good (London: Burns and Oates 1907), a book for girls returning home permanently after life away at boarding school.
16. Holy Mass (1907).
17. Confession and Communion for Religious and for Those Who Communicate Frequently (London: Burns and Oates, 1908).
18. Holy Mass (1908).
19. Heavenwards (London: Burns and Oates, 1910).
20. The Children's Charter (London: Burns and Oates, 1911).
21. Why Must I Suffer? A Talk With the Toilers (Catholic Truth Society, 1911).
22. The Prayer Book for Children (1911, republished 2012 as The Little Children's Prayer Book).
23. Blessed are They That Mourn (London: Burns and Oates, 1917). "A book for those bereaved by the war. The consoling thoughts are drawn from the scriptures and from the Church's doctrine, and are developed with much convincingness and solidity," The Irish Monthly, June, 1917. "Exquisitely beautiful and soothing," The Catholic Standard and Times (Philadelphia), May 25, 1917.
24. Hail! Full of Grace: Simple Thoughts on the Rosary (London: Burns and Oates, 1917).
25. The King of the Golden City: An Allegory for Children (London: Burns and Oates, 1921). "A charming allegory," The Catholic Historical Review, January 1923.
26. With the Church: Thoughts on Her Seasons and Chief Feasts (London: Burns and Oates, 1924). "A series of meditations written in simple yet vivid words, provocative of personal thought and aiming at practical rather than exalted spirituality, though it succeeds eminently in attaining both," Blackfriars, November 1924.
27. Credo (pamphlet), 1926.
28. With the Church (Burns, Oates, and Washbourne, 1928).
29. Trust (her last book, 1930).

Many of her books were edited, and often introduced, by Jesuit father Herbert Thurston SJ.
