= Herbert Thurston =

English priest and theologian (1856–1939)

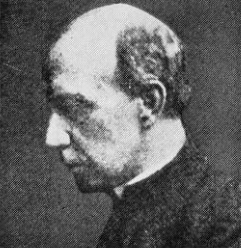
- Born: Herbert Henry Charles Thurston; 15 November 1856; London, England
- Died: 3 November 1939 (aged 82); London, England
- Education: Stonyhurst College; London University
- Occupation: Clergyman

Herbert Henry Charles Thurston SJ (15 November 1856 – 3 November 1939) was an English priest of the Roman Catholic Church, a member of the Jesuit order, and a prolific scholar on liturgical, literary, historical, and spiritual matters. In his day, he was regarded as an expert on spiritualism. Today he is remembered chiefly for his extensive contributions to the Catholic Encyclopedia. He also served as editor of Mother Mary Loyola, an international bestselling author of popular religious books.

== Life ==
Herbert was the only son of George Henry Thurston, a surgeon, and his wife Theresa Ellen née Tuck. He was born in London and educated at the minor seminary of Saint-Malo (1868–9), at Mount St Mary's Jesuit school in Derbyshire (1869–71), and at Stonyhurst College in Lancashire (1871–4). Having decided to join the Jesuits, he underwent the usual noviciate training at Manresa House in Roehampton (1874–6), after which he took his first vows. He also studied at the University of London where he earned a Latin exhibition in 1877 and received a bachelor's degree, along with a university prize, in 1878. From 1877 to 1880 he resided at Stonyhurst Saint Mary's Hall while studying scholastic philosophy.

Thurston taught at Beaumont College from 1880 to 1887 and studied theology at St Beuno's College from 1887 to 1891. He was ordained as a priest on 21 September 1890. He was appointed as prefect of studies of Wimbledon College, a Jesuit secondary school, where he was also headmaster for a single term in 1893–4. After that he resided at Farm Street, the Jesuit house in Mayfair, for the next forty-five years.

== Writing ==
Thurston's writing career spanned over sixty years. As a liturgical scholar, he first became known for his writings on rubrics. Thurston wrote more than 150 articles for the Catholic Encyclopedia (1907–1914), and published nearly 800 articles in magazines and scholarly journals, as well a dozen books. He also re-edited Alban Butler's Lives of the Saints (1926–1938).

Many of Thurston's articles show a skeptical attitude towards popular legends about the lives of the saints and holy relics. For instance, he defended and publicized the work of the French priest and historian Ulysse Chevalier against the authenticity of the Shroud of Turin. On the other hand, his treatment of spiritualism and the paranormal was regarded as "too sympathetic" by some within the Catholic community.

Father Thurston joined the Society for Psychical Research in 1919, and he was a friend of psychical researcher Everard Feilding. Thurston attributed the phenomena of stigmata to the effects of suggestion. He criticized Spiritualism for its confidence that mediums communicate with the dead. He believed that "some ‘communications’ may originate in the medium's subconscious, while many alleged communications appear to be self-contradictory."

He was also a close friend of Father George Tyrrell, a fellow Jesuit priest who was sanctioned by the Catholic Church for his Modernist theological opinions. Thurston died in London in 1939 and was buried at the St Mary's Catholic Cemetery, Kensal Green.

== Selected publications ==
- Madame Blavatsky and The Jubilee of Theosophy (The Month, 1926)
- Modern Spiritualism (1928)
- The Church and Spiritualism (1933)
- The Physical Phenomena of Mysticism (1952)
- Ghosts And Poltergeists (1953)
- Surprising Mystics (1955)
