= Hose coupling =

Connector on the end of a hose

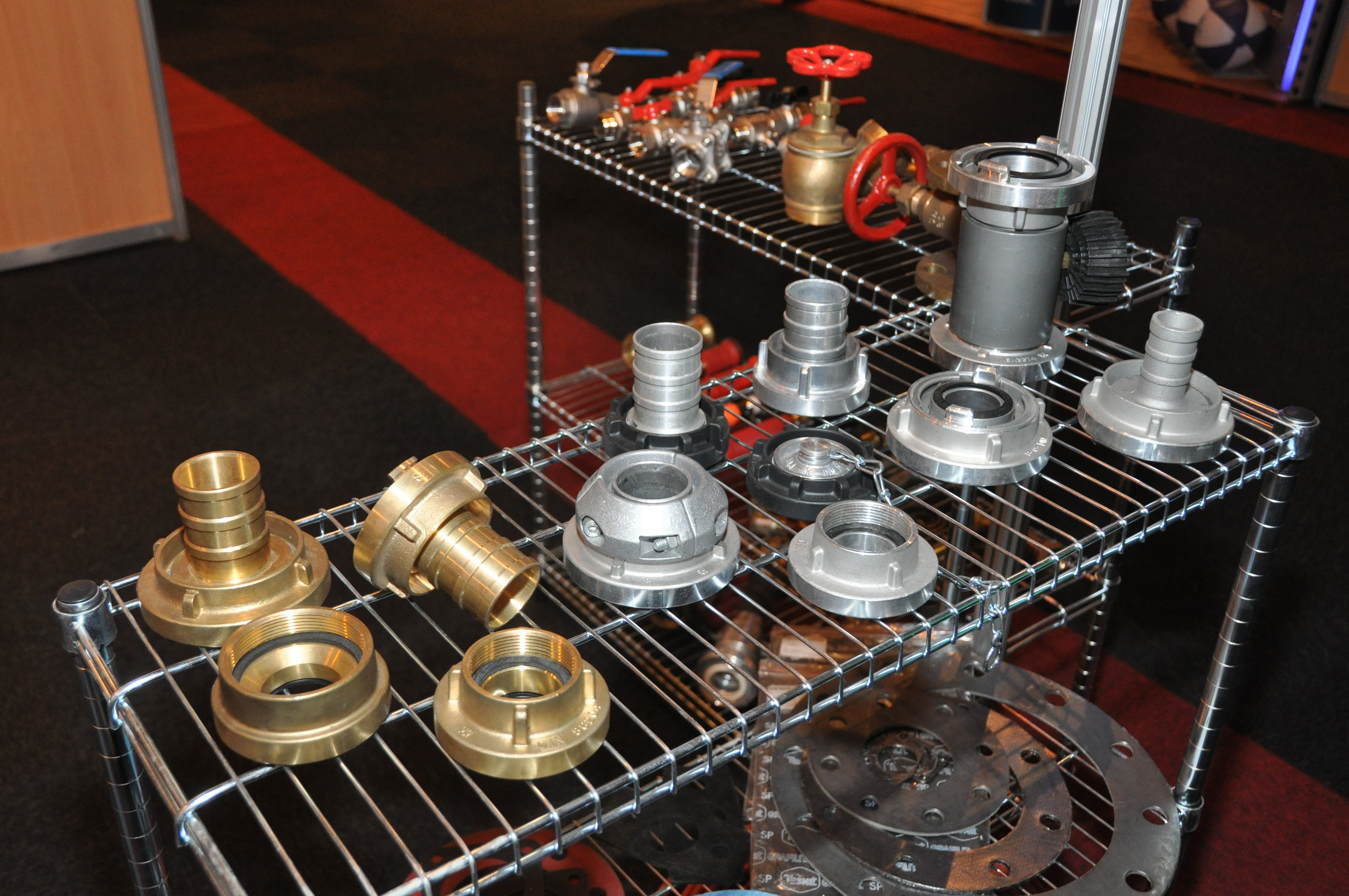
A selection of Storz hose couplings

A hose coupling is a connector on the end of a hose to connect (or couple) it with another hose or with a tap or a hose appliance, such as an irrigation sprinkler. It is usually made of steel, brass, stainless steel, aluminium or plastic.

Due to the great variety of the designs and the number of countries in which they were created, it is difficult to trace the origin of many. Patents that cover designs similar to those below include:

- 1876: Hose-coupling, No. 175,232.
- Coupling for hose and pipe. US 894900 A
- 1915: Coupling. US 1248558 A
- 1931: Coupling. US 1947593 A (claw-types)

== Threaded coupler types ==
=== Garden hose thread ===
See Garden hose thread. See also Hoselink and Hozelock plastic click-on connectors.

=== GFR ===
NF E 29-579 GFR

=== Ground joint ===
A "boss" ground joint coupling valve hose coupling, primarily used for compressed air or steam. It consists of a stem, wing nut and spud. It seals as a soft copper seat located in the spud is drawn against the stem by tightening the wing nut.

=== Holedall ===
Holedall (a.k.a. Mulconry, Scovill, or Rostra) dock hose couplings are built to the BS EN 1765:2004 "Rubber hose assemblies for oil suction and discharge services Specification for the assemblies", commonly known as dock hoses.

These are internally swaged hose couplings and commonly found on larger diameter fuel oil hoses used in higher pressure applications or where the hose is exposed to higher end pull, e.g., Oil Suction & Discharge (OS&D) hose). They are installed with special hydraulic ram machinery and special dies.

Holedall IX internally expanded (internally swaged) hose coupling is used in higher pressure applications, or where the hose is exposed to higher end pull, or where a full flow is required. They are installed with special hydraulic drawbar machinery, using special pull plugs.

=== NH ===
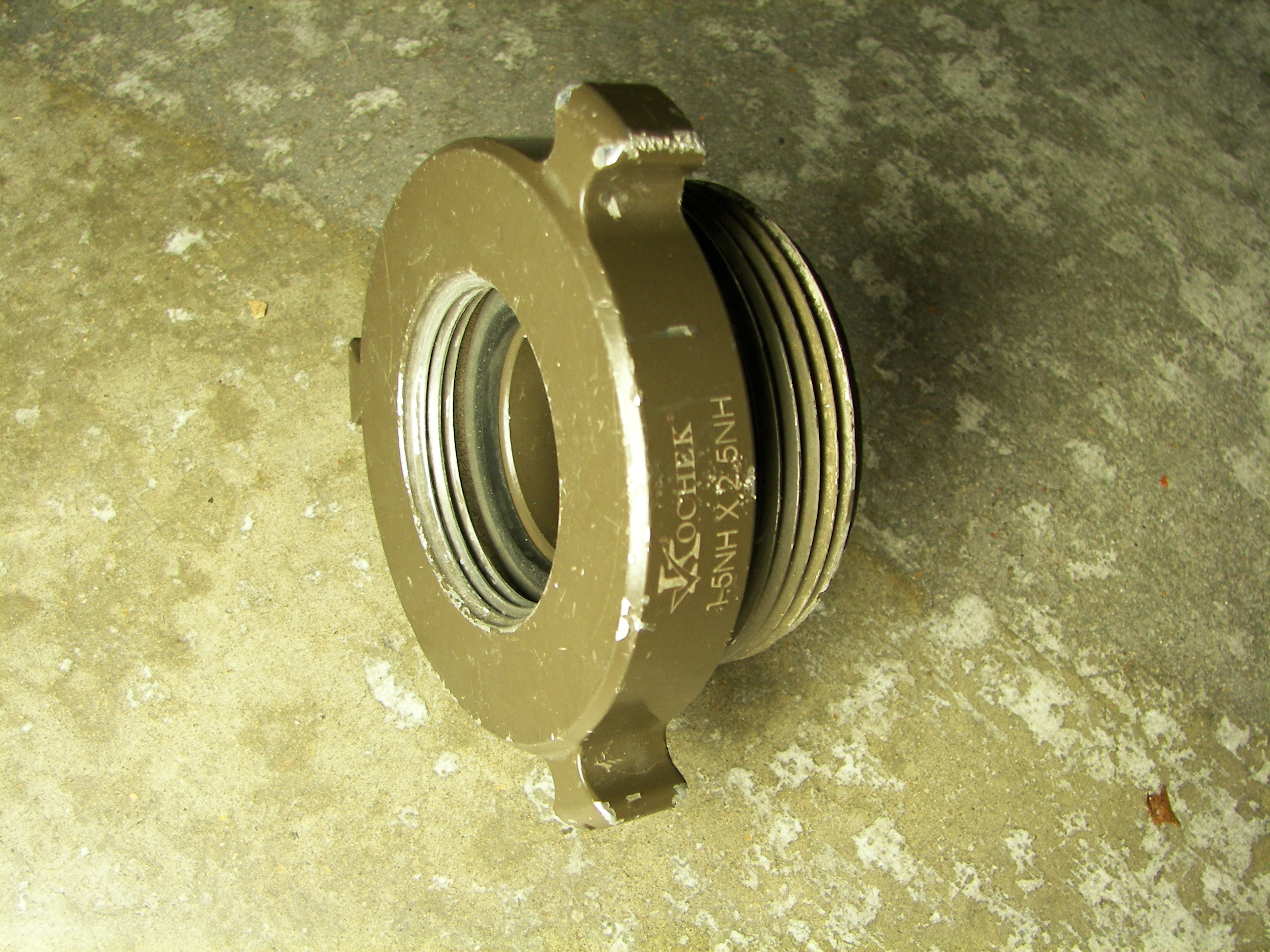
Side view of a 1.5-to-2.5-inch (38 to 64 mm) adapter

National Hose thread (NH), also known as National Standard Thread (NST). It is the most common type of fire hose coupling used in the United States. The male and female straight (non-tapered) threads screw together and the connection is sealed with a gasket.

The type of threaded coupling with a pin-lug swivel used on fire hoses was first manufactured prior to 1873 in the U.S.:

- Unknown patent by Charles W. Emery, dated July 11, 1865,
- 1874: Hose-couplings, No. 149,029 by W. A. Caswell
- 1874: Hose-couplings, No. 149,441 by W. A. Caswell, describes a method of casting the hose tail inside the coupler, so that it can pivot but not be detached.
- 1876: Hose-coupling, No. 175,232.

Despite the age of these couplings, incompatibilities still exist.

=== UNI ===
UNI Fire Fittings are used in Italy, and available in several sizes, including UNI 25, UNI 45, and UNI 70.

=== BS336 ===
The suction hoses and pump intakes of UK fire appliances use a round thread form of 3 threads per inch and either 4 or 5-1/2 inches diameter. The male and female threads fit quite loosely so that they can be assembled quickly even when dirty. A rubber washer forms the seal.

== Non-threaded gendered coupler types ==
=== Camlock ===
A camlock, also called cam and groove, is a quick connect fluid transfer hose coupling that consists of a male "adapter" and female "coupler". The adapter has a groove on the outside that is engaged by the "cam arms" on the outside of the coupler to effect a seal against the gasket inside the "coupler". They are commonly used for petroleum or chemical applications. Specified by Mil-C-27487 / A-A-59326A / EN 14420-7 / DIN 2828.

=== Perrot Cardan coupling ===
Similar in appearance to Bauer couplings, but not compatible with them. Used in agricultural, irrigation, cleaning, and construction industries, but most commonly for water, mortar, bitumen, and bulk products.

=== British instantaneous coupling ===
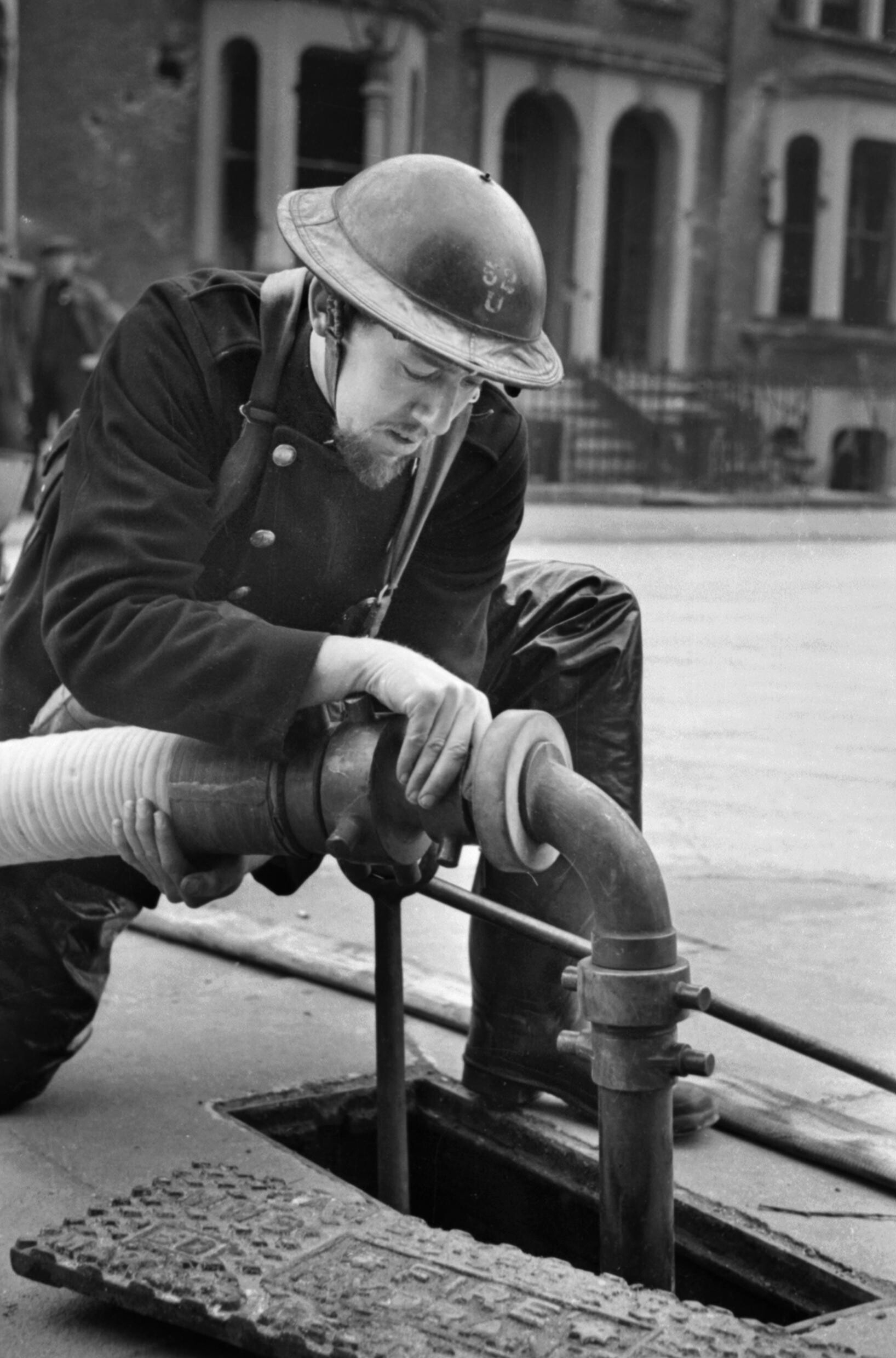
Auxiliary Fireman Bernard Hailstone attaches a hose to a fire hydrant, somewhere in London, c. 1940.

Also called John Morris Coupling, BS336 Instantaneous fire couplings are similar in design to the camlock fittings, and are used by UK, Irish, New Zealand, Indian and Hong Kong fire brigades. They are available in two sizes: 1 1/2-inch INST (FETA, only available with 38 mm hose tails) and 2 1/2-inch INST (BS336).

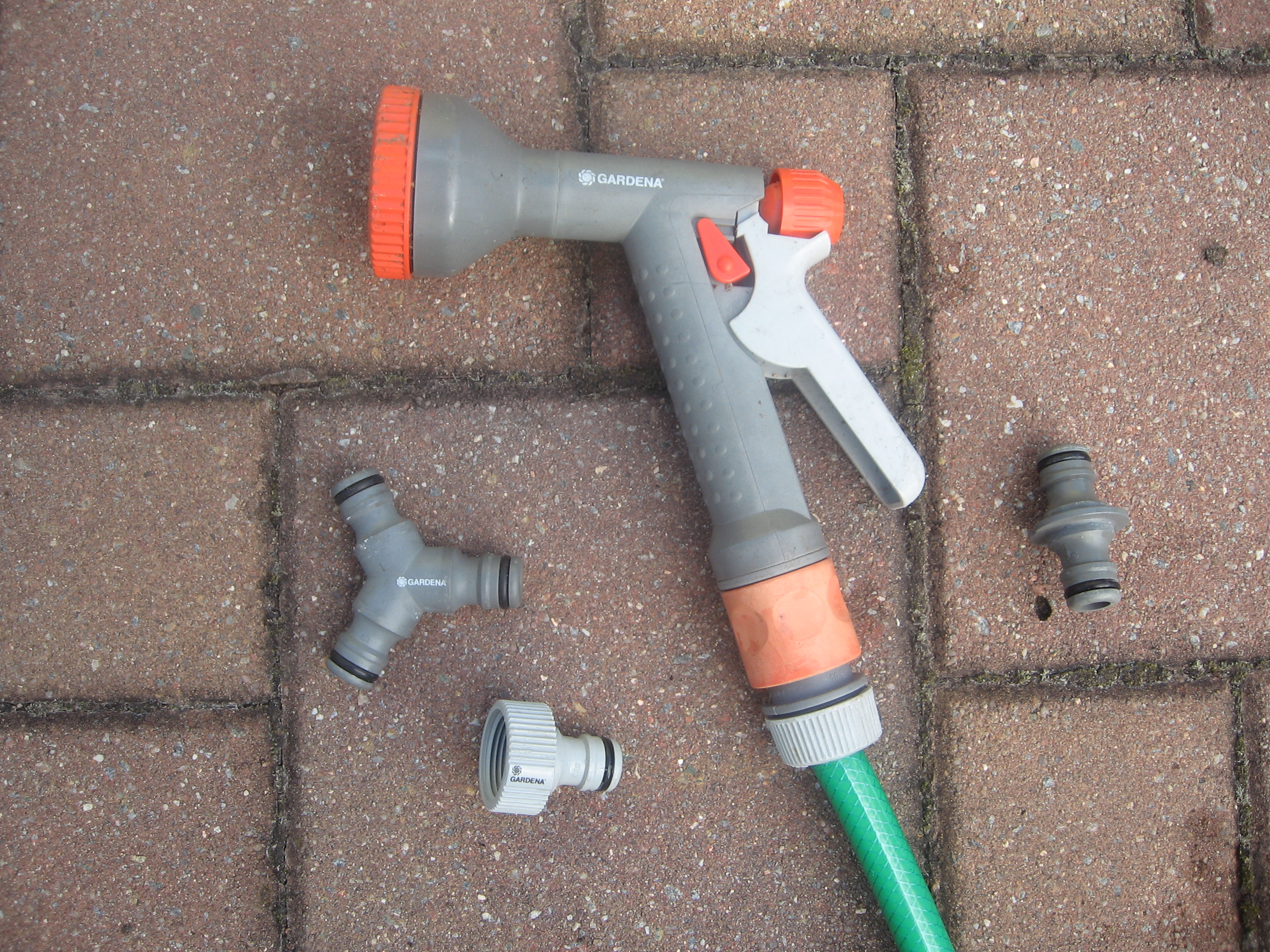
Hozelock-compatible garden hose couplers (Gardena brand)

=== Hozelock ===
In 1959 Hozelock Ltd in the United Kingdom invented and patented the international standard plastic, click-on style, push-fit hose end connector now used with garden hoses. The concept was developed to replace metal hose end connectors in coal mines, which were prone to cause static sparks and the possibility of methane gas explosions. All-metal versions of the connector (and compatible with the plastic versions) are now in common use for garden hoses. The system is now universally used by gardeners throughout the world. The Hozelock brand adapters are typically available with BSP threads. There are two different sizes of the connectors available, with the larger one being rare and mainly used on 3/4-inch hoses.

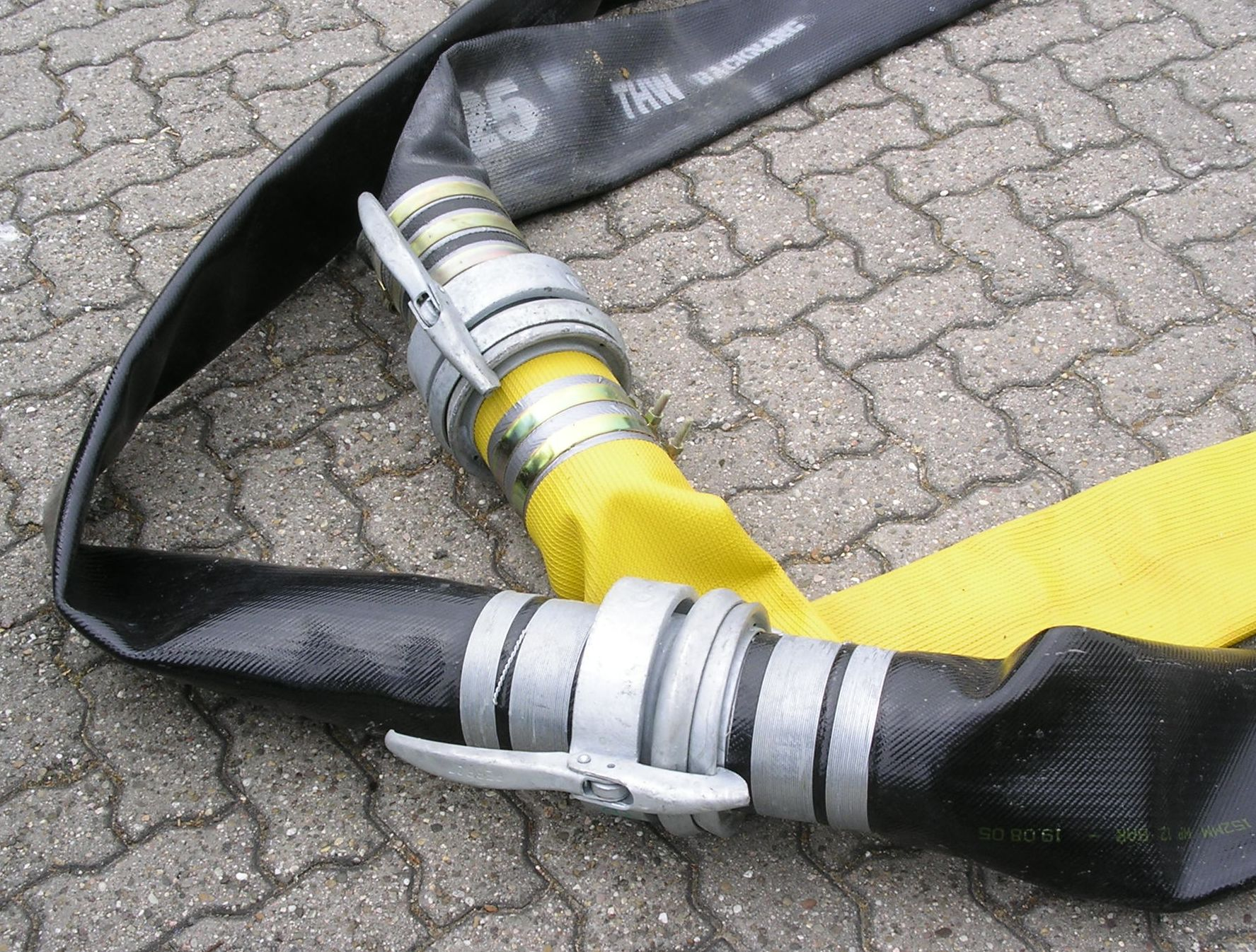
Perrot-brand Bauer-style hose couplings

=== Leverlock ===
A cam and lock-like coupler, used in the agricultural industry. Also known by the brand names of manufacturers, including Bauer, Perrot, and Miller/Ferrari. Available in sizes ranging from 2-inch to 12-inch.

=== Machino ===
A Japanese quick connect and disconnect coupling used on fire hoses in Japan and defined by JIS B9911; available in several sizes: 25A (1-inch), 40A (1 1/2-inch), 50A (2 1/2-inch), 65A (2" ), 75A (3-inch).

=== Tankwagen flange couplings ===
A.k.a. TW couplings, or tanker couplings, these were originally defined by DIN 28450, but are now specified by EN ISO 14420-6. The couplings are widely used in the petrochemical, chemical, and food industries.

=== Quick-connect garden hose couplings ===
A variety of manufacturers sell the same style quick-connect garden hose coupling. The design is similar in concept to the plastic Hozelock design, in that the female coupling has a spring-loaded outside barrel that locks onto the male coupling, but both couplers are usually made of brass and the male coupling lacks the rubber O-ring found on the Hozelock couplers.

== Non-threaded genderless coupler types ==
Many of these couplings are of the so-called "claw" type. Some of the information below has been taken from commercial product catalogs and specifications.

=== Air King ===
The "Air King" universal air hose coupling, also known as a "Chicago style" fitting, is malleable iron or brass "quarter turn" "sexless coupling" usually found on large pneumatic tools like jackhammers. The fitting is considered "universal", because a common two-lug head is used on all sizes ranging from 0.25 to 1 inch (6 to 25 mm).

=== Barcelona ===
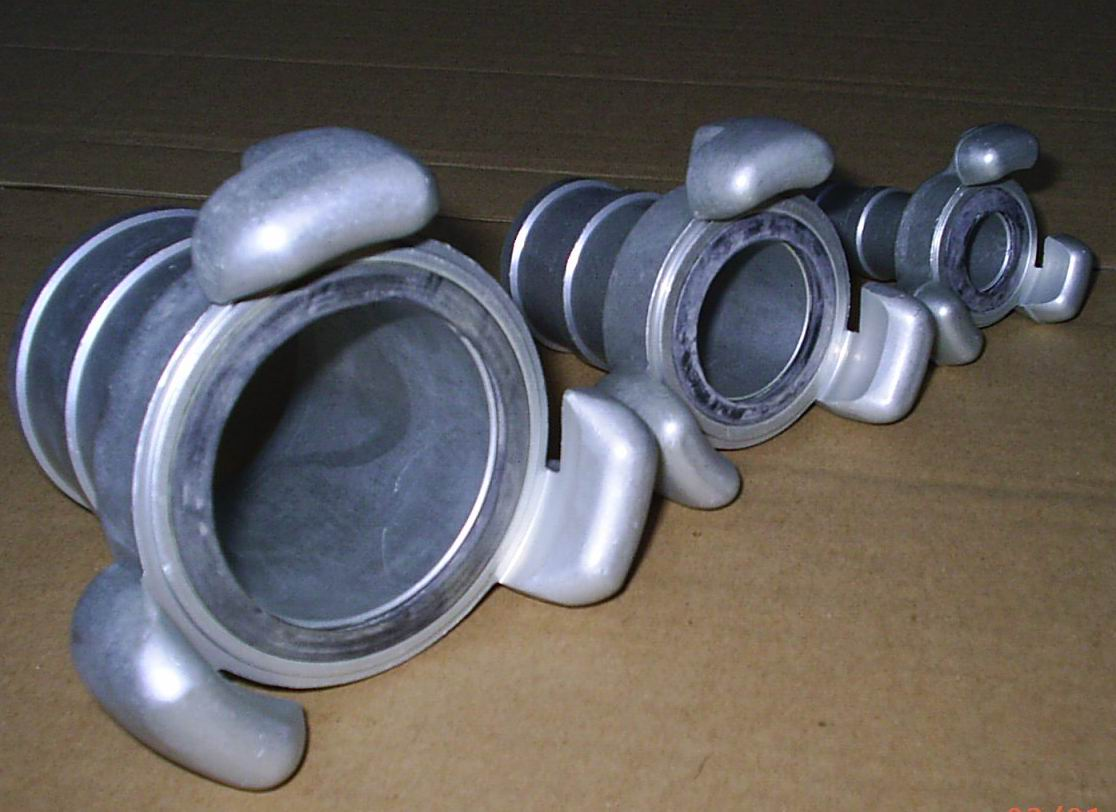
Spanish fire hose coupling

This coupling is used by Spanish firefighters, and is defined by Spanish Standard UNE 23400. It is a sexless coupling with three engaging lugs, and is available in several different sizes, including Barcelona 25 (25 mm hose ID), Barcelona 45 (45 mm hose ID), and Barcelona 70 (70 mm hose ID).

Suitable for delivery (pressure) only, not suction.

DSP hose coupling

=== DSP ===
A French hose coupling, compatible with Guillemin couplings, but used for different purposes. Conforms to NF S61-704 and NF S61-705. Available in the following sizes:

- DSP ND 40 Suitable for delivery (pressure) only, not suction.
- DSP ND 65 Suitable for delivery (pressure) only, not suction.
- AR ND 100 Suitable for delivery (pressure) and suction.

=== European air coupling ===
Defined by DIN 3238, DIN 3489 (combines DIN 3481, 3482, 3483, 3484, and 3485), and DIN 11204 (with hole for safety clip), these look similar to Express and Geka couplings, but have a 42 mm distance between the claws.

=== Express coupling ===
Express coupling

Very similar in appearance to GEKA couplings, but not compatible with them, because Express couplings have a 41 mm distance between the claws. These are defined by NF E 29-573. Used for both water and air.

=== Forestry coupling ===
Developed by the Canada Metal Company for the Canadian wildfire firefighters in 1977 to overcome issues of snagging and water volume loss associated with the smaller-diameter Storz couplings, these couplings are now specified for use by Canadian, U.S., and Australian wildland fire departments. The coupling design is specified by CAN/ULC-S551-13 (25 mm and 38 mm forged couplers), CAN/ULC-S558-13 (25 mm and 38 mm non-forged couplers), and ULC/CAN-S574 (64 mm forged couplers), as well as USFDA 5100-192 (US Forest Service) and available for use with 19 mm, 25 mm, 38 mm, and 64 mm hose sizes. Note that Wajax Manufacturing submitted a competing design, but was not selected, so referring to these fittings as "Ajax couplers" is incorrect.

=== Geka steam hose coupling ===
This is a sexless quarter-turn bayonet hose coupler, originally manufactured by the Karasto company distinguishable by the gasket profile, which has a flat outer ring enclosing a domed middle section, as well as the distance between the claws being 40 mm. Sometimes called a "swift quick release coupling" or "claw coupling". This is based on the design of the Giersberg fire extinguisher coupling (predecessor to the Storz coupling), and was developed by Julius Oehler in the late 1920s, and was patented in 1932. The name GEKA is formed from the combination of Giersberg and Karasto. These couplings are used mostly for gardening and irrigation, but New Zealand uses them for some wildland fire fighting.

=== GOST ===
A sexless coupling, a.k.a. Bogdan coupler, used on fire hoses in Russia and defined by GOST R 53279-2009, available in several sizes, including DN 25, DN 40, DN 50, DN 65, DN 70, DN 80, DN 100, DN 125, and DN 150.

=== Guillemin symmetrical clutch ===
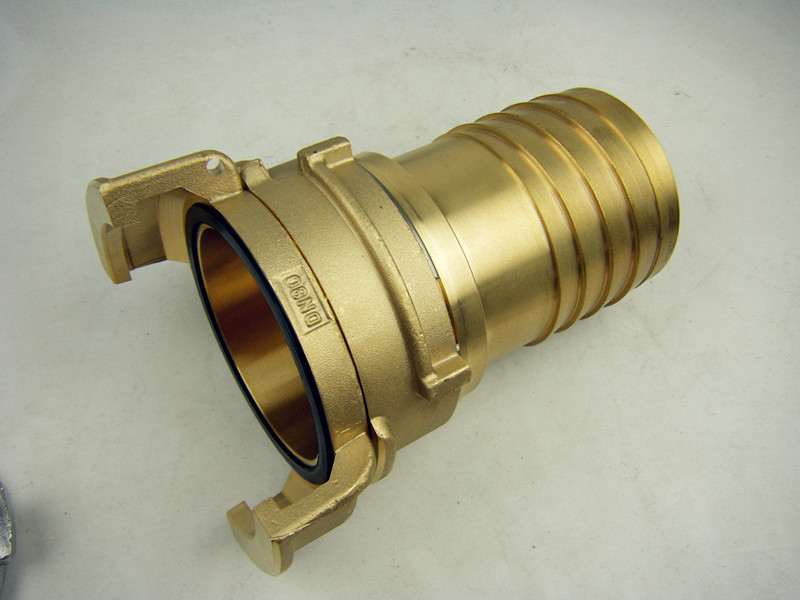
Brass Guillemin coupling

The Guillemin symmetrical clutch, also called Guillemin coupling, is widely used in France and in Belgium to couple hoses and resembles a DSP coupling, which is used in firefighting. It can be fastened by hand, but it is also possible to use a tricoise wrench. It has quarter-turn closing and is sexless (symmetrical). It may be fabricated from aluminum, stainless steel, brass or polypropylene. The standard for this kind of coupling is EN14420-8/NF E 29-572, and there is a special standard DIN14420-8 for unique assemblies with ferrule and safety clamp.

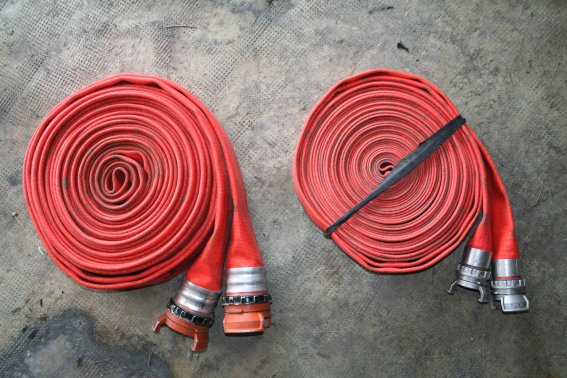
45 mm and 70 mm diameter fire hoses, with Guillemin couplings installed

Guillemin couplings are available in the following sizes (unit: mm):

- Guillemin 20
- Guillemin 25
- Guillemin 40
- Guillemin 50
- Guillemin 60
- Guillemin 65
- Guillemin 80
- Guillemin 100
- Guillemin 150

=== Hoselink ===
Hose link is a 1/4-turn bayonet-mount garden hose connection, which uses an o-ring to o-ring seal. It was designed by Hoselink, Pty, Ltd., Australia, and patented in 1998. It is popular in Australia, with limited distribution in the UK and the US, where it is distributed by Dayco Products, Inc.

=== Nakajima ===
A quarter-turn, sexless coupling used on fire hoses in Japan, defined by JIS F-7335, and available in several sizes, including: JIS 40A, JIS 50A, and JIS 65A.

=== NOR:las ===
Norway uses NOR fittings for attack hoses. They come in three sizes: NOR 1 (83 or 84 mm; 2 1/2-inch), NOR 2 (65 or 66 mm; 2"), and NOR 3 (50 or 55 mm; 1 1/2-inch). NOR 2 is mostly used in the maritime and offshore oil industry.

=== Nunan and Stove ===
A UK fire hose fitting, used mostly by the Ministry of Defence, available in the following sizes: N&S 1 1/2-inch, N&S 2-inch, N&S 2 1/2-inch, and N&S 3-inch.

=== ROTTA 3-lugs ===
A Russian coupling similar in appearance to Barcelona fittings, available in two sizes: Rotta 50 and Rotta 70.

=== SFS ===
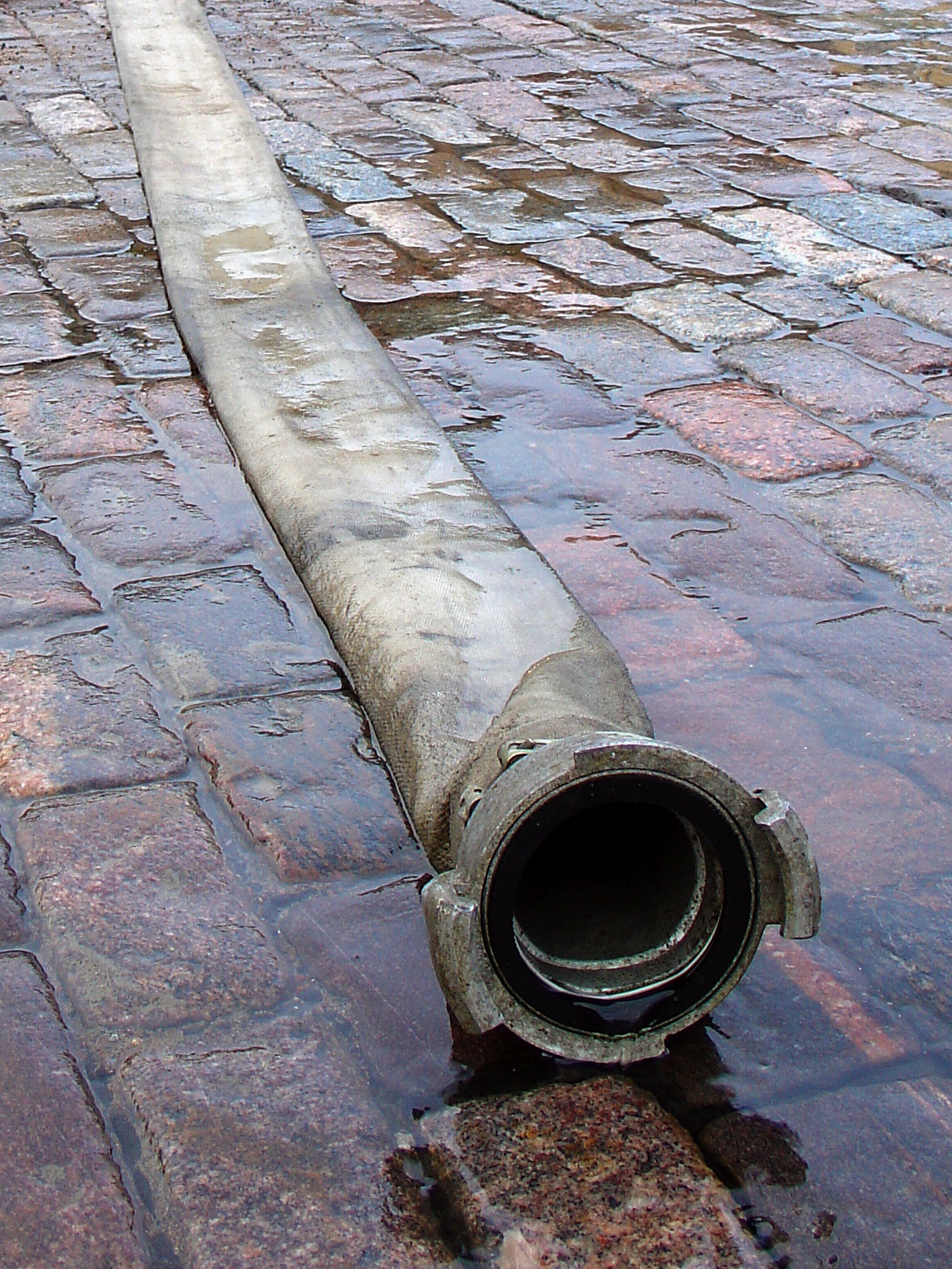
Finnish firehose

Finnish SFS couplers are similar to GEKA couplers, and come in three diameters, DN 50, DN 80 and DN 100, with each being offered with a range of hose tail diameters, including 13 mm to 52 mm for the DN 50 size, 65 mm and 75 mm for the DN 80 size, 102 mm and 110 mm for the DN 100 size.

=== SMS 63 FORM ===
Short for Swedish Metric Standard, this Swedish hose coupling is available in two sizes: SMS 32 and SMS 63.

=== Storz ===
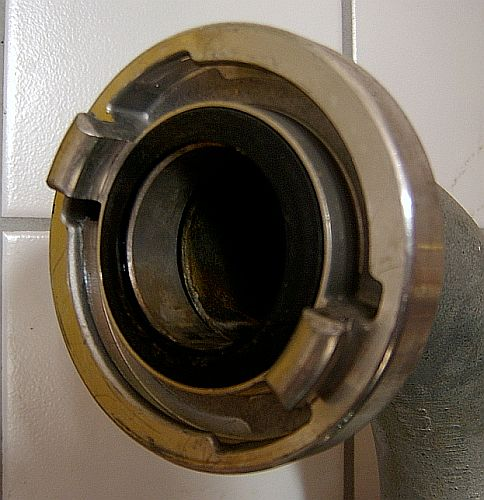
Storz connection on a standpipe

A Storz coupling is a quarter-turn or sexless coupling, commonly used to connect to fire hydrants. It is easy to connect, has no particular male or female end, and lugs are on the inside of the joint. This is the standard coupling on fire hoses in Denmark, Germany, Austria, Poland, Switzerland, Sweden, the Netherlands and Greece. It is also widely used in Australia. It can be manufactured by casting for general hose connection and low pressure applications, but for firefighting, it is better to use forgings to guarantee the safety and durability of the coupling.

Storz couplings are available in several sizes, supporting hoses with an internal diameter of between 12 and 250 mm, and are specified by DIN standards 14301, 14321, 14322, and 14323 (hose couplings); DIN standards 14306, 14307, 14308, and 14309 (threaded adapters); DIN standards 14341, 14342, and 14343 (swivel reducers); and DIN standards 14310, 14311, 14312, and 14313 (caps).

First patented: Switzerland, Patent No. 3,134, published November 26, 1890

U.S. patent: US489107 A published Jan 3, 1893

== Flanged couplings ==
=== Tri-clamp connection ===
Stainless steel tri-clamp fittings create a quick clamp union for sanitary, leak proof connections. Completed with clamp and gasket to mate the two ends. Clamp connections can be secured without the use of tools when using wing nut style clamps. Primarily utilized in food, beverage and pharmaceutical industries.

Specified by DIN 32676 / SMS 1145 / RJT BS:4825 / IDF.

=== ISC International Shore Connection ===
A defined flange that can have any of several of the above couplers installed.

== Miscellaneous ==
=== Safety clamps ===
Specified by EN 14420-3 / DIN 1817, and also specified by EN 14420-5 / DIN 2817.

=== Wire fittings ===
BS 6391:2009 specifies how to use wire to attach hose couplings to layflat hoses.

== See also ==
- AN thread
- Gladhand connector—used on railroad car brake systems
- Glossary of firefighting equipment
- Hose barbs
- Hose clamp
- Jubilee Clip
- Housing cable
