= DSP coupling =

Self-sealing symmetrical coupling for fire-fighting hose

A DSP coupling is a self-sealing symmetrical coupling which is secured by inter-connecting two couplings together.

It is closed by turning the locking ring on the triangular part of the opposed DSP coupling.

Extra closure can be applied by locking the connection with couplings wrench.

DSP coupling

DSP wrench

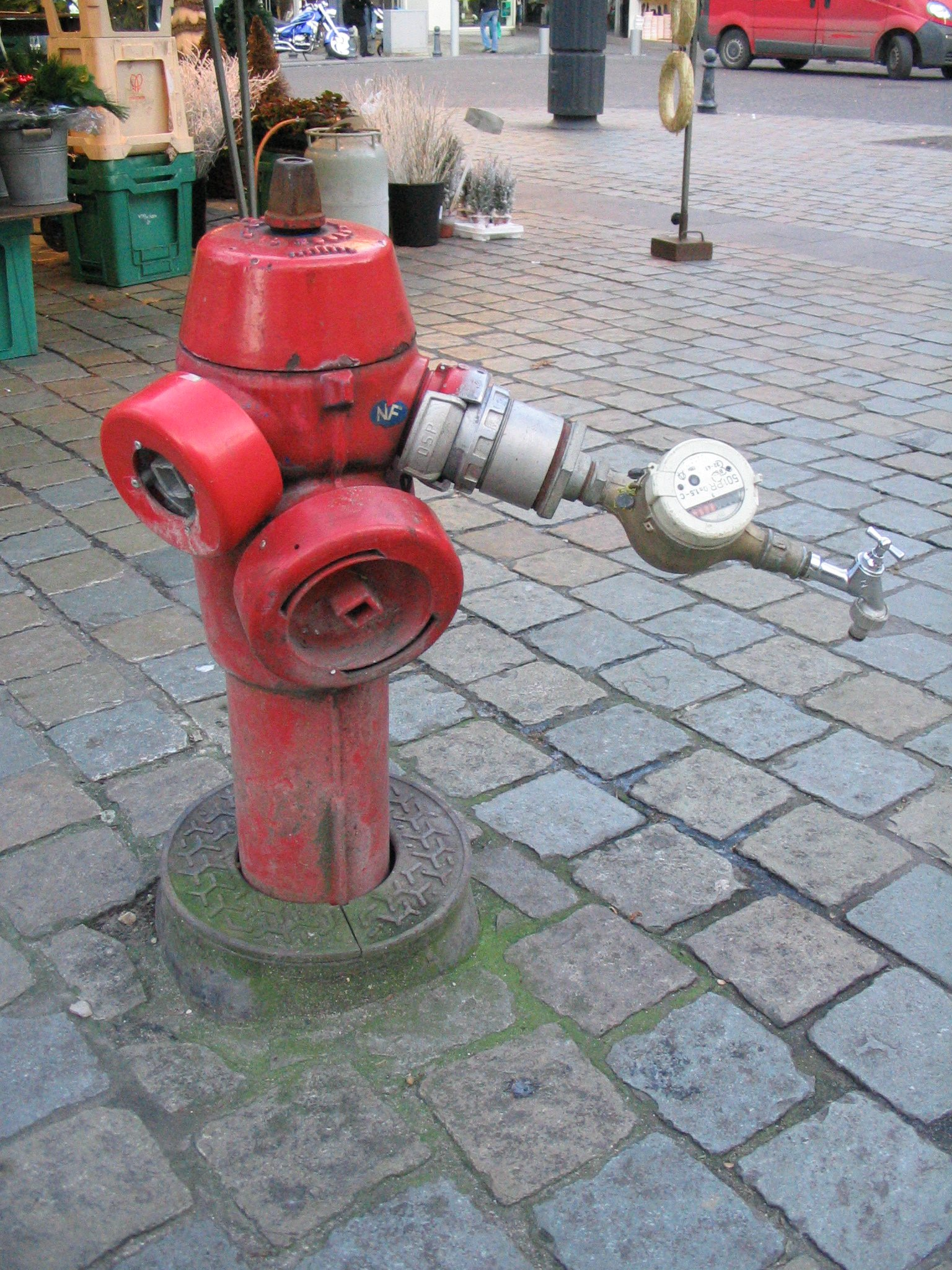
Coupling on a Belgian fire hydrant with a DSP connection to deliver water to an individual.

The DSP coupling locking principle is similar to that of the guillemin coupling. However, there are differences to the preformed serration on the locking ring and the design of the lugs.

The locking ring of DSP couplings can be turned up to 45°.

DSP coupling are used as fire-fighting couplings. They are typical in for e.g. France and Belgium.

DSP couplings are symmetrical.

DSP comes in different sizes. (e.g. DN40 DN65 DN100).

Typical materials for the coupling are aluminum, brass and bronze.

For the Origin or meaning of "DSP" there is only speculation.

== See also ==
- Hose coupling#DSP
