= Jack Morris (disambiguation) =

Jack Morris (born 1955) is an American former baseball pitcher.

Jack Morris may also refer to:

== Sports ==
- Jack Morris (American football) (1931–2022), American football player
- Jack Morris (footballer) (1878–1947), English footballer
- Jack Morris (jockey) (1845–1896), British jockey
- Jack Morris (wrestler) (born 1993), Scottish wrestler

== Others ==
- Jack Morris (Jesuit) (1927–2012), American Jesuit priest
- John Brande Morris (also known as Jack Morris; 1812–1880), English Anglican theologian, later a Roman Catholic priest
- Jack Morris, character in the 2018 American science fiction action film The Meg

== See also ==
- John Morris (disambiguation)
- Jackie Morris (born 1961), British writer and illustrator
