= Jonathan Morris =

Jonathan Morris may refer to:

- Jonathan D. Morris (1804–1875), American politician
- Jonathan Morris (commentator) (born 1972), American media correspondent and former Roman Catholic priest
- Jonathan Morris (author) (born 1973), English author, connected with the Doctor Who franchise
- Jonathan S. Morris, American political scientist
- Jonathan Morris, fictional character in Castlevania: Portrait of Ruin

== See also ==
- Jonathon Morris (born 1960), English actor, from the sitcom Bread
- Jon Morris (1942–2026), American football player
- Jon Morris (ice hockey) (born 1966), American ice hockey player
- John Morris (disambiguation)
- Johnny Morris (disambiguation)
