= John Morris (Jesuit) =

English Jesuit priest and scholar of Church history

John Morris SJ (4 July 1826 – 22 October 1893) was an English Jesuit priest and scholar of ecclesiastical history.

== Life ==
=== Early life ===
Morris was born in Ootacamund, Tamil Nadu, then under the British Raj. He was a son of John Carnac Morris, FRS, an official of the East India Company who was also a noted scholar of Telugu, and of his wife, Rosanna Curtis. He was educated partly in India, partly at Harrow School, partly in reading for Cambridge with Dean Alford, the New Testament scholar. Under him a great change passed over Morris's ideas. Giving up the thought of taking the law as his profession, he became enthusiastic for ecclesiastical antiquities, took a deep interest in the Tractarian movement, and resolved to become an Anglican clergyman.

Going up to Trinity College, Cambridge, in October 1845, Morris became the friend, and then the pupil of F. A. Paley, grandson of the well-known divine, and already one of the leading Greek scholars of the university. The conversion to Catholicism of John Henry Newman, followed by many others, impressed him, and he was converted by Bishop Wareing, 20 May 1846.

A storm followed, beginning in The Times, which made itself felt even in Parliament. Paley had to leave Cambridge (which led to his subsequently joining the Catholic Church), while Morris was practically cast off by his family. He then went to the English College, Rome, under Dr. Thomas Grant, and was there during the Revolutions of 1848. He was ordained a Catholic priest the following year, and returned to England.

=== Jesuit priest ===
When Morris returned to England, he was initially stationed in Northampton, and later in Marlow, Buckinghamshire. Soon after the restoration of the English Catholic hierarchy in 1850, he was named a canon of the new Diocese of Northampton. He returned to Rome to serve as the Vice-Rector of the English College (1853–1856). During this period, he became postulator for the English Martyrs, whose cause for beatification he greatly advanced. Returning to England, he took part in the third Synod of Westminster, became secretary to Cardinal Nicholas Wiseman, whom he nursed on his death-bed, and then served under Wiseman's successor, Henry Edward Manning, until he left to become a Jesuit in 1867.

Morris went to Belgium where he was admitted to the novitiate of the Society of Jesus in Louvain, and professed simple vows in 1869. He was then assigned to the Jesuit community in Roehampton, and became the first Superior of the Jesuit Mission in Oxford. He taught Church History from 1873 to 1874 at the College of St. Beuno, in Tremeirchion, Wales; he was the founding Rector of St. Ignatius of Loyola College in Luqa, Malta, in 1877. He returned to England in 1880 to serve as the Master of novices for the newly established English Jesuit Province, serving in that position until 1886. It was he who first asked Mother Mary Loyola to write a book about making first communion. It became an international bestseller, and she went on to publish at least 27 more books translated into multiple languages and sold around the world. He was named a Fellow of the Society of Antiquaries of London in 1889 and in 1891 he became the director of the staff of Jesuit writers at the Immaculate Conception Church, Farm Street, operated by the Jesuits in Mayfair.

Morris retired to Wimbledon, London, in 1893. He died there while preaching in the pulpit, uttering the words, "Render to God the things that are God's."

== Works ==
Morris's major works were:

- The Life and Martyrdom of St. Thomas Becket (London, 1859 and 1885);
- The Life of Father John Gerard (London, 1881), translated into French, German, Spanish, and Polish;
- Troubles of our Catholic Forefathers (3 vols., London, 1872–1877);
- Letter-books of Sir Amias Poulet (London, 1874);

He contributed to The Month, The Dublin Review, Archæologia, and other periodicals.
