= John Morris (cricketer, born 1880) =

English cricketer (1880–1960)

Personal information
- Full name: John Frederick Morris
- Born: 14 October 1880; Ampthill, Bedfordshire, England
- Died: 23 March 1960 (aged 79); Norwich, Norfolk, England
- Batting: Right-handed
- Bowling: Right-arm slow

Domestic team information
- Years: Team
- 1900–1902: Bedfordshire
- 1902: Cambridge University

Career statistics
Competition	First-class
Matches	1
Runs scored	9
Batting average	–
100s/50s	–/–
Top score	7*
Catches/stumpings	–/–
- Source: Cricinfo, 28 July 2019

John Frederick Morris (14 October 1880 – 23 March 1960) was an English first-class cricketer.

Morris was born at Ampthill. He later studied at the University of Cambridge, where he made a single appearance in first-class cricket for Cambridge University against London County at Fenner's in 1902. He batted twice in the match, ending both Cambridge innings' not out with scores of 7 and 2. In addition to playing first-class cricket, Morris also played minor counties cricket for Bedfordshire from 1900–02, making nine appearances. He died at Norwich in March 1960.
