= John Morris and Sons Salford =

Former manufacturer of fire fighting equipment (established 1877)

John Morris & Sons Limited of Cross Lane, Salford, Manchester, Lancashire, were manufacturers of all kinds of fire fighting equipment from fire engines, manual then motorised, fire retardant foams, and electrical fire alarms, down to firemen's axes and fire buckets.

John Morris & Sons Limited is now a dormant subsidiary of Schneider Electric Limited, manufacturers of industrial safety systems.

== History ==
The business was founded in Salford by John Morris by 1877. After he retired in 1905 his three sons – John, James and Fred – incorporated a limited liability company, John Morris and Sons Limited. This company remains in existence but dormant. Part of its former business is continued by a division of Schneider Electric industrial safety systems.

== Inventions ==
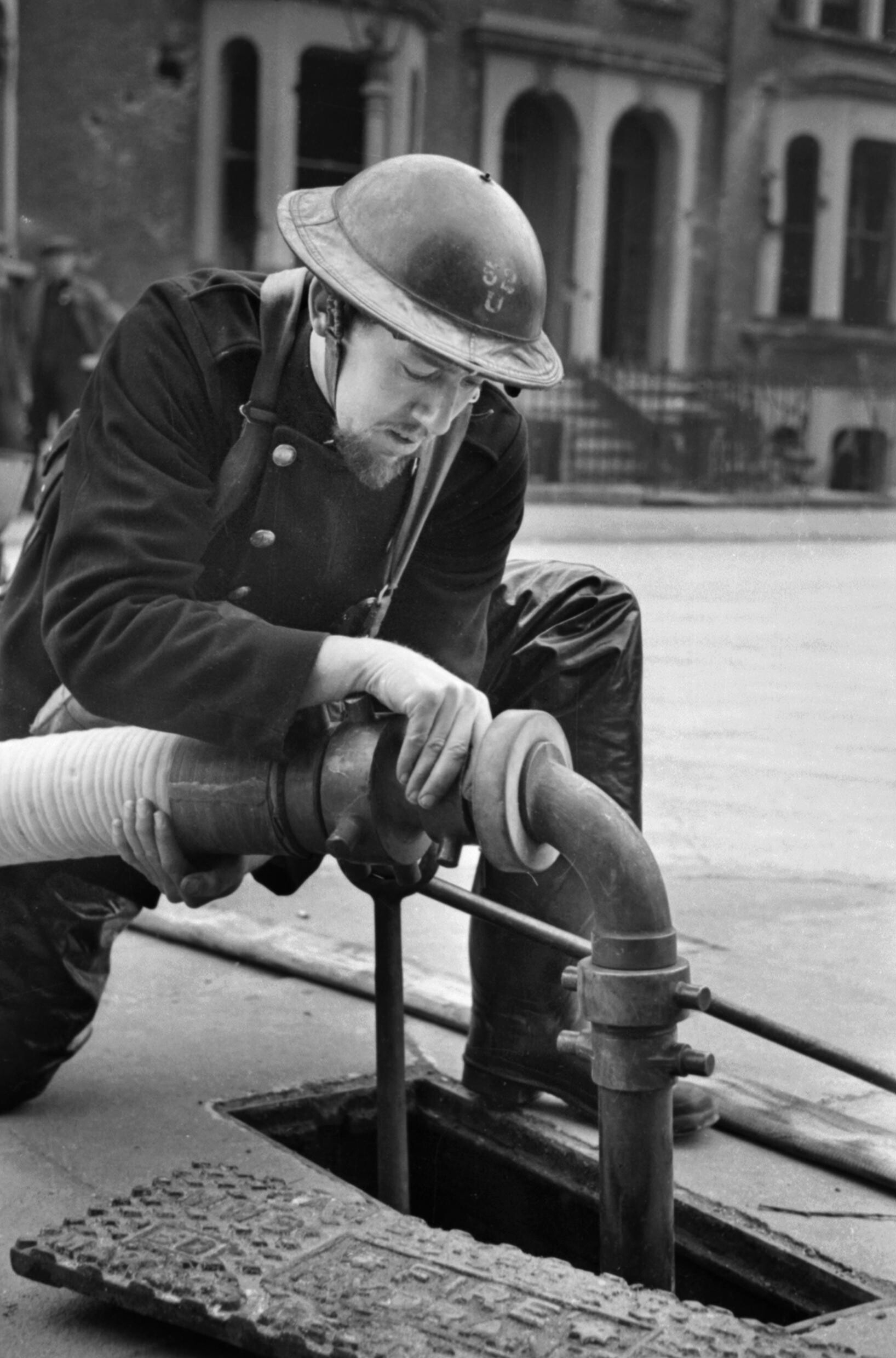
Auxiliary Fireman Bernard Hailstone attaches a hose to a fire hydrant, somewhere in London, c. 1940

=== Morris instantaneous coupling ===
John Morris senior invented and patented his Morris instantaneous coupling for fire hoses in 1876. (1876: Hose-Coupling, No.175,232). Not only was coupling instantaneous but the water flow was much less restricted. It became a British Standard coupling (BS 336) at the time of the Second World War, and is now known as British Instantaneous.

=== Firesnow ===
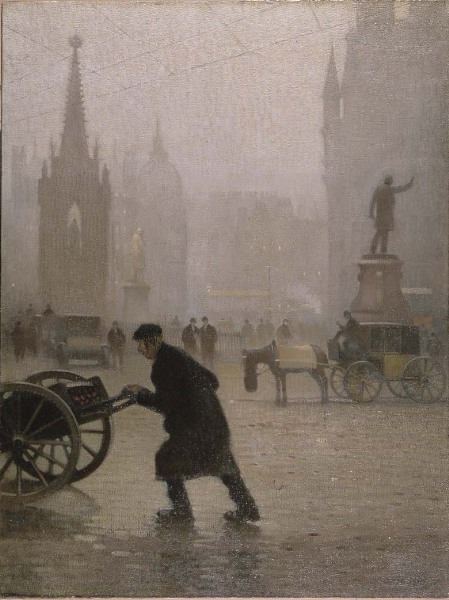
Albert Square, Manchester by Pierre Adolphe Valette, 1910

John Morris (Firesnow) Limited was incorporated in May 1921 to take over the business of fire engineer previously carried on under the name James Morris in Albert Square, Manchester.

Managing director John Morris junior invented a compound in a froth-forming liquid charged with carbonic acid gas which when sprayed on a fire prevents combustion by excluding oxygen.

It was demonstrated to interested parties in May 1920. In 1952 a new Firesnow factory was built in Stockport Cheshire.

John Morris (Firesnow) Limited 00174760 was liquidated in 1971 and dissolved.

== Products ==
Ajax escape ladder, Chester

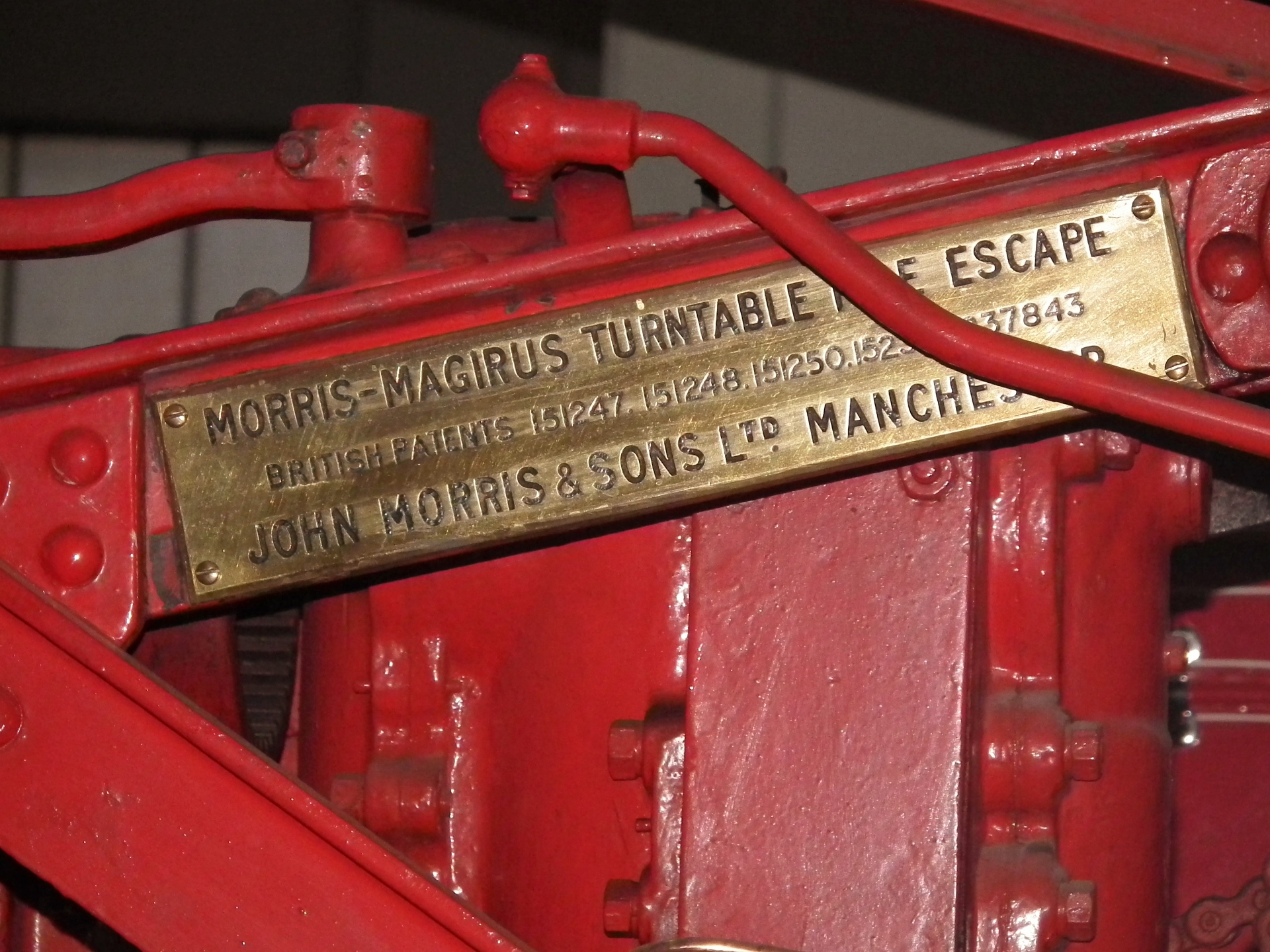
Morris-Magirus turntable fire escape, Australia

At Salford Fire Engine Works, Manchester 5, John Morris and Sons manufactured:

- Fire engines—pump escapes— (until 1921?)
- Morris-Magirus turntable escapes (until the second world war) mounted on other brand heavy commercial vehicles
- Morris own-design turntable escapes mounted on other brand heavy commercial vehicles (at least into the 1950s)
- Wheeled escapes
- Trailer pumps, hose reel carts
- Ajax extension ladders, portable extension ladders, belt and rope fire escapes, rope ladder fire escapes
- Union canvas fire hose, nozzles sprayheads and valves
- Acme flax fire hose
- Morris hose couplings, hydrants, adaptors and connectors, standpipes, branch pipes
- Fire extinguishers, Fireman's axes, Fire buckets, Fire engines

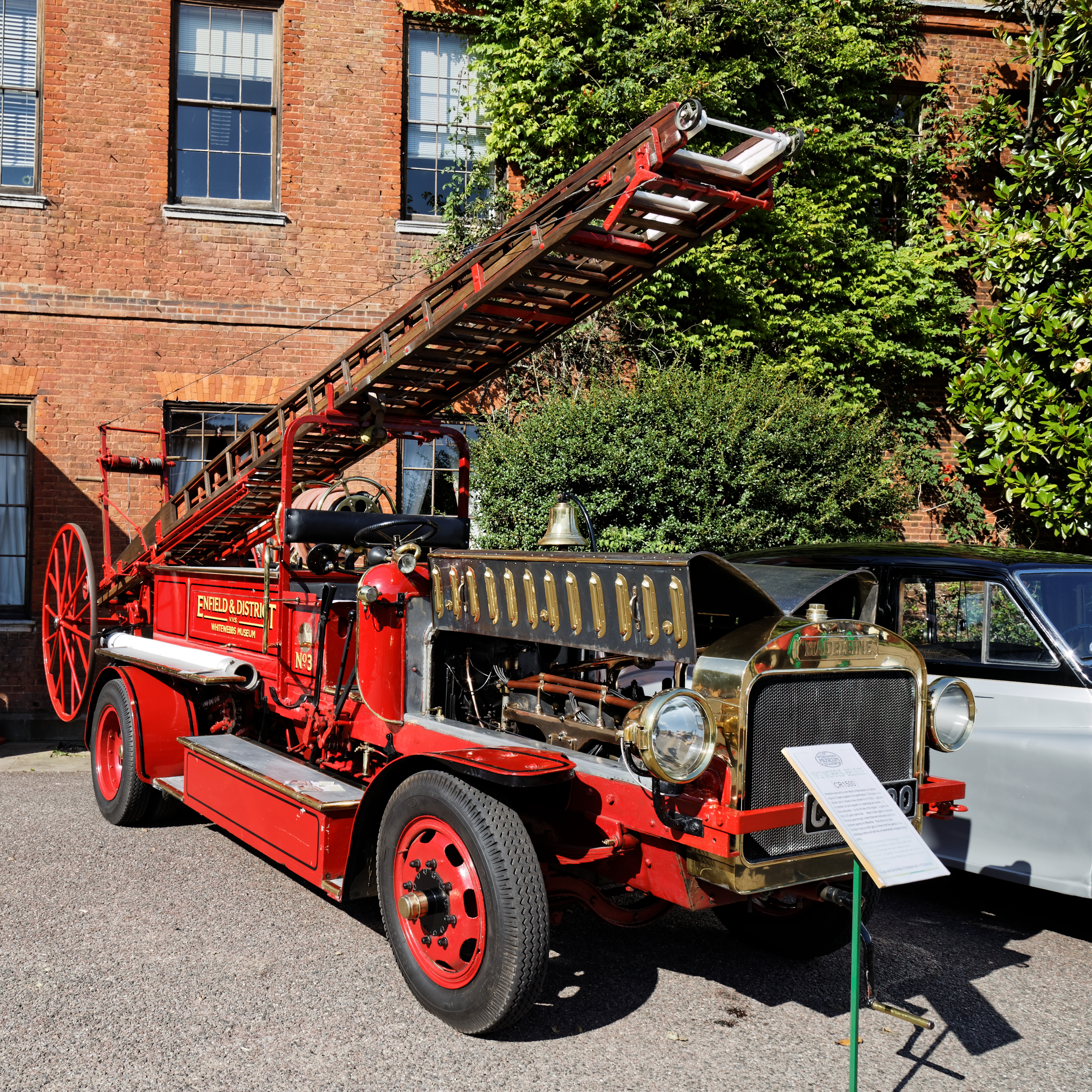
1912 pump escape with Belsize 14.7 litre engine—Southampton Fire Brigade

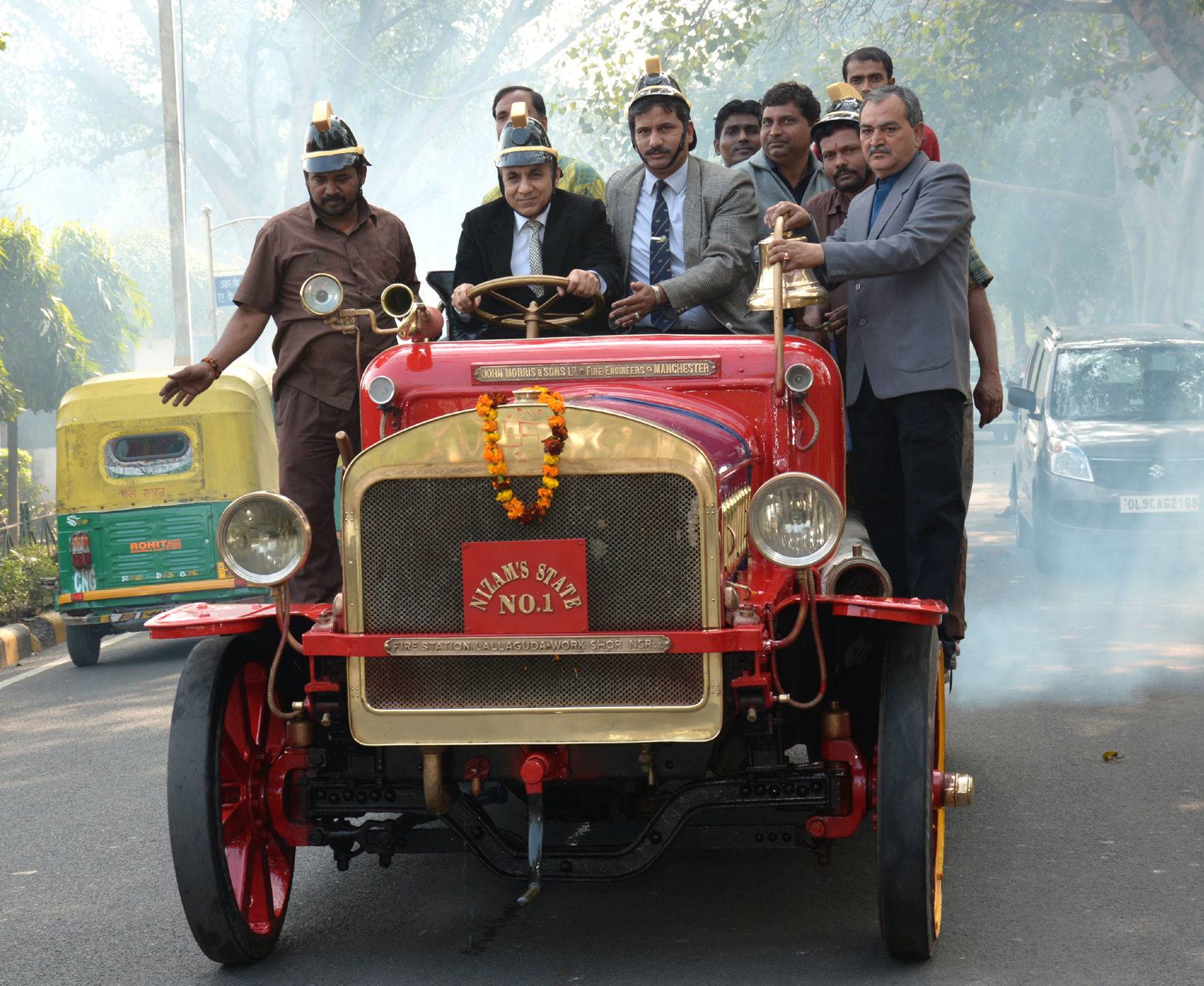
1914 fire engine—Indian Railways

A long established maker of horse-drawn fire-engines, John Morris and Sons came a little late to the manufacture of motor vehicles.

John Morris and Sons' first motor driven "first-aid motor fire engine" was built in 1905 for Cape Town's Metropolitan Fire Service. It was fitted with a 30–40 h.p. Belsize engine and provided accommodation for six firemen.

The first motor-driven fire-pump built by John Morris and Sons was for the Bury Town Council. It was built in 1909 after Morris and Sons had already turned out from its works a large number of motor-driven first-aid engines, tenders, and fire-escapes.

Their Ajax petrol-propelled motor pump was fitted with a 70 b.h.p. engine which drove a special form of turbine pump which, it was claimed by the makers, had advantages over similar existing apparatus of other makes as well as over various types of reciprocating pump which were also being offered. The pump was extremely compact, leaving room for considerable first-aid plant including a 50-ft. sliding-carriage escape, a 30-gallon chemical tank complete with reel and hose, and stowage capacity for 2,000 ft. of hose and all the other standard equipment suitable for such a turnout. The capacity of the standard pump offered by this maker was rated at 350 gallons per minute although an alternative 450-gallon pattern was also available.

=== Home market ===
Manchester Corporation acquired its first self-propelled units in 1911 including a John Morris motor pump of 500-gallon capacity. The John Morris pump had a Belsize engine. Two more John Morris 400–500-gallon motor pumps and a John Morris motor hose-carriage were added in 1913 and the next year four more John Morris motor pumps were added, one with a long-stroke engine. The war diverted production but a three-ton Belsize chassis was equipped by John Morris and Sons with a 350-gallon pump in 1917. It was joined in 1919 by another John Morris four-cylinder 500-gallon motor pump, this time fitted with a long-stroke engine enabling pumping capacity to be lifted to 500–600 gallons of water per minute. A similar unit was supplied the next year.

=== Postwar ===
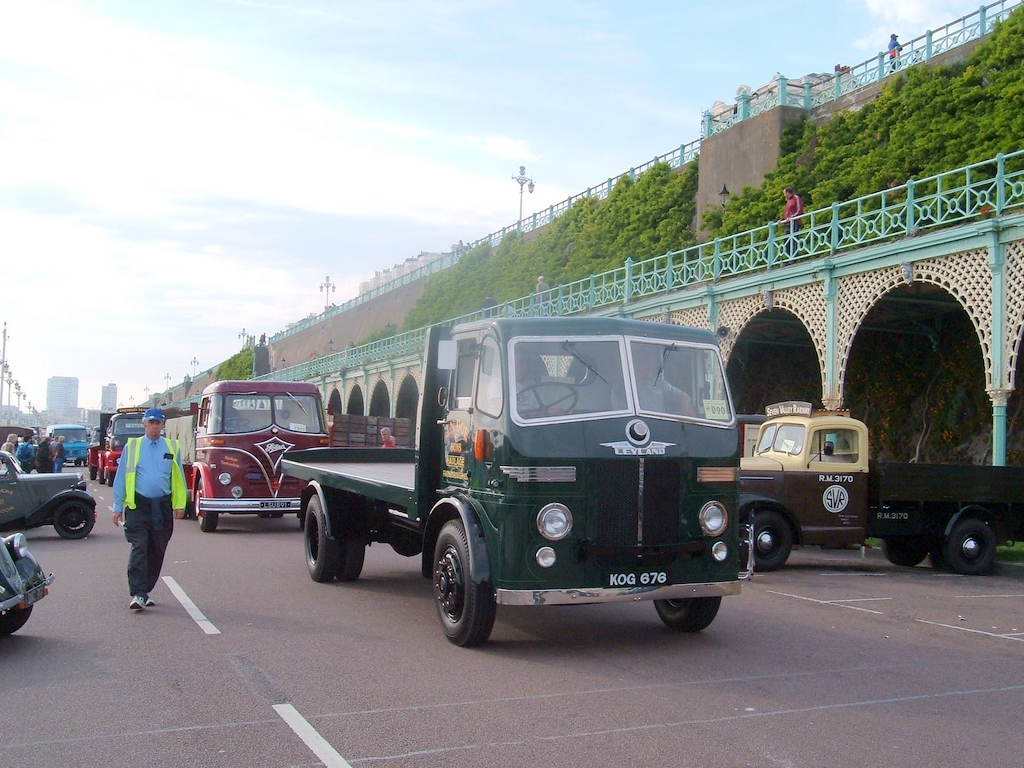
1948 Leyand Beaver

In 1952, John Morris and Sons offered a 100-foot turntable pump escape on a Leyland Beaver haulage-type chassis. It incorporated a device providing automatic compensation for road camber and gradient and an automatic cut-out when the escape reached the safety limit of extension at a given angle of elevation. The hydraulic escape ladder reached full height in 18–20 seconds. In an emergency, the ladder could be operated manually. There was a two-way loudspeaker telephone. The Coventry-Climax pump had a capacity of 350–500 g.p.m. The usual compartment behind the driver's cab seated a crew of four, and at the sides and rear of the platform were lockers for storing hose, monitor branches, unions, tools and other equipment. The escape stopped instantly if the ladder met any obstruction while being moved.

== Siebe Gorman ==
Siebe Gorman, manufacturers of diving and breathing apparatus, bought John Morris and Sons for cash in January 1970. Siebe Gorman merged with BTR in 1999 to form Invensys, which became part of Schneider Electric in 2013.
