= John Morris (Australian cricketer) =

Australian cricketer

Personal information
- Born: 5 June 1831; Sydney, Australia
- Died: 9 December 1921 (aged 90); Glebe Point, New South Wales, Australia
- Source: ESPNcricinfo, 9 January 2017

John Morris (5 June 1831 – 9 December 1921) was an Australian cricketer. He played one first-class match for New South Wales in 1858/59.

== See also ==
- List of New South Wales representative cricketers
