= John Carnac Morris =

English civil servant

John Carnac Morris FRS
- Born: 16 October 1798; England
- Died: 2 August 1858 (aged 79); Jersey, France
- Occupation: Civil Servant
- Family: John Morris (son), Edward Ellis Morris, (son)

John Carnac Morris FRS (16 October 1798 – 2 August 1858) was an English civil servant of the East India Company, and scholar of Telugu.

== Biography ==
Born 16 October 1798, was eldest son of John Morris of the Bombay civil service, who was subsequently a director of the East India Company. The son entered the Royal Navy as a midshipman, and saw active service during the last two years of the Napoleonic Wars. On the conclusion of the war in 1815 his father sent a note to his captain, George Sartorius: "Your trade is up for the next half-century. Send my son John home by the next coach".

Morris went to the East India Company College at Haileybury, and entered the Madras civil service, reaching India in 1818; five younger brothers also obtained employment under the East India Company. Morris served for a time at Masulipatam (in 1821) and Coimbore. In 1823 paralysis deprived him of the use of his legs. Most of his time was then spent at Madras in the secretariat, or board of revenue. He was Telugu translator to the government from 1832, and in 1839, became civil auditor or accountant-general. He established in 1834 the Madras government bank, of which he was the first secretary and treasurer, and in 1835 superintendent. The bank was subsequently transferred by the government to private hands.

While on furlough in England between 1829 and 1831 Morris was elected Fellow of the Royal Society. He was an enthusiastic freemason, in Madras and in England. On leaving India in July 1846, he received a testimonial from the local population.

Settling in Mansfield Street, Portland Place, London, in 1848, Morris spent much of his time thenceforth in commercial enterprises. He established a company to run steamers between Milford Haven and Australia by way of Panama, which lasted only a few years; and he promoted and was managing director of the London and Eastern Banking Company. In 1855 he resigned its management of the company to become chairman; but colleagues made speculations, and in 1858 the bank was wound up. Morris placed all his resources at the disposal of the official liquidator, and retired to Jersey, where he died on 2 August 1858. He was buried in Saint Helier.

== Works ==
Morris studied Sanskrit, Persian, and Hindustani; but concentrated on Telugu. He compiled of the text-book Telugu Selections, with Translations and Grammatical Analyses: to which is added a Glossary of Revenue Terms used in the Northern Circars, Madras, 1823 (enlarged edition, Madras, 1855); and he was author of an English-Telugu Dictionary, based on Johnson's Dictionary, the first of its kind. It was issued at Madras in 1835.

Morris was also for several years from 1834 editor of the Madras Journal of Literature and Science.

== Family ==
Morris married Rosanna Curtis, second daughter of Peter Cherry of the East India Company's service, on 4 February 1823, and was father of John Morris (1826-1893), and other sons.

== Notes ==
Attribution This article incorporates text from a publication now in the public domain: Lee, Sidney, ed. (1894). "Morris, John Carnac". Dictionary of National Biography. Vol. 39. London: Smith, Elder & Co.
