= John Thomas Morris =

John Morris MM

WO2 John Thomas Morris MM (17 October 1931 - 10 March 2015) was a British Army soldier of the Royal Leicestershire Regiment who won the Military Medal in Korea in 1951 in an action against the Chinese at Maryang San.
