= John Morris (piper) =

John Morris, aka Morris Sarsfield, aka Muiruich (fl. 1850-75), Irish piper.

Morris was a native of Clydagh, Headford, County Galway, and appears to have been called Morris Sarsfield "from hero worship of the famous general", Patrick Sarsfield (c.1660-1693). The Irish-speaking people of the area knew him as Muiruich.

Nicholas Burke stated "he was a powerful man and a great player on the pipes" but very restless, unable to stay in one place for long. He spent much of his life in England, "but if he happened to be at home at the time, he was sure to be off with the crowd that went harvesting to that country every year."

Once, in Wales, he was keeping good company with a group of miners until he was asked to play The Collier’s Reel. Not knowing the tune, he performed another in its place which displeased the miners ("To be unable to play the tune so named after their trade or calling was to be unworthy of their patronage") with the result that the miners chased him out of town.

It is unknown when he was born, or died, or where. All O'Neill could say for certain was that he was alive in the third quarter of the 1800s.

== See also ==
- Paddy Conneely (died 1851)
- Martin O'Reilly (1829-1904)

== Sources ==
- Famous Pipers who flourished principally in the second half of the nineteenth century Chapter 21 in Irish Minstrels and Musicians, by Capt. Francis O'Neill, 1913.
