= Gladhand connector =

Interlocking hose coupling fitted to hoses supplying pressurized air for braking

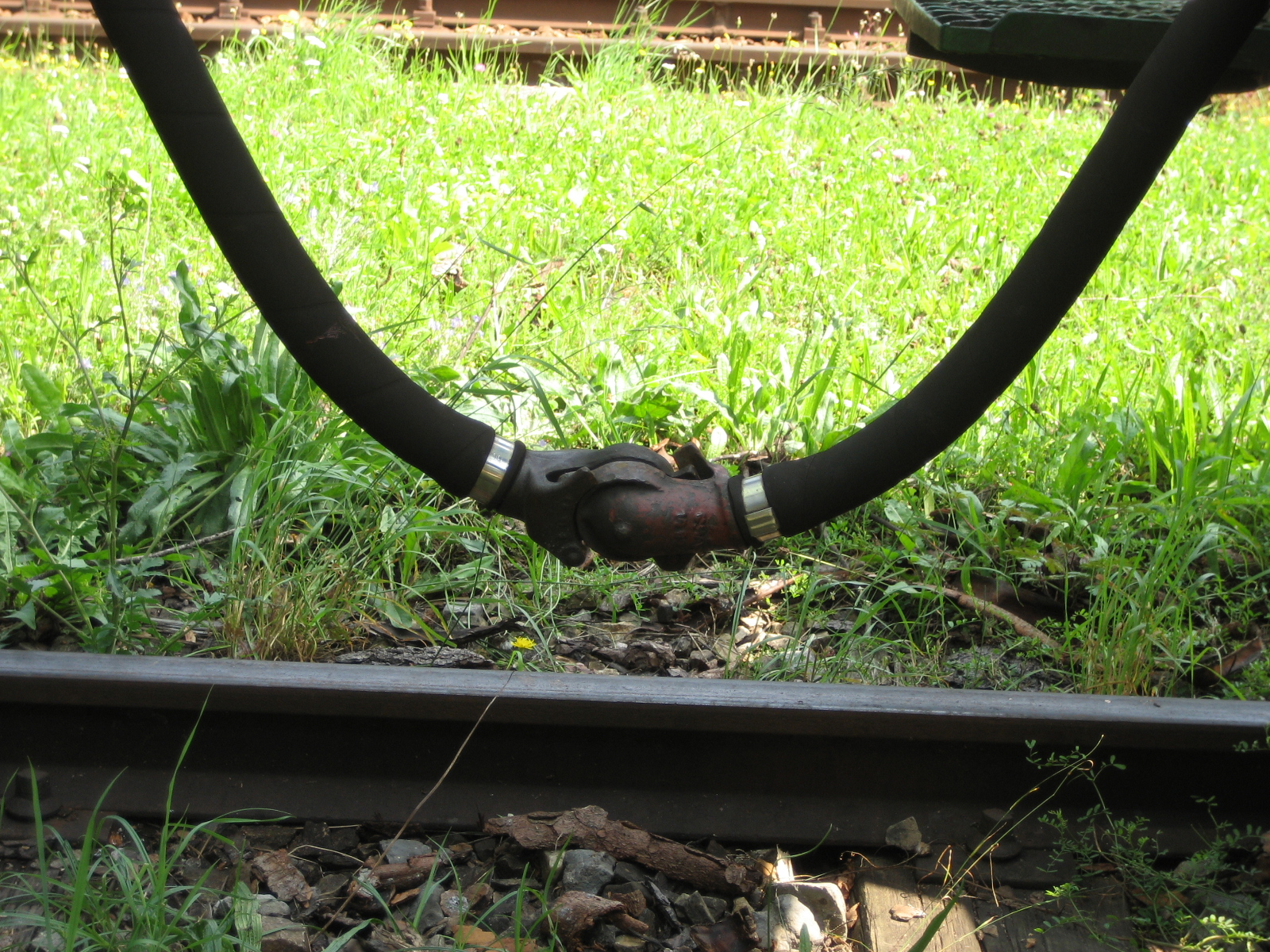
A pair of gladhand connectors between railroad cars

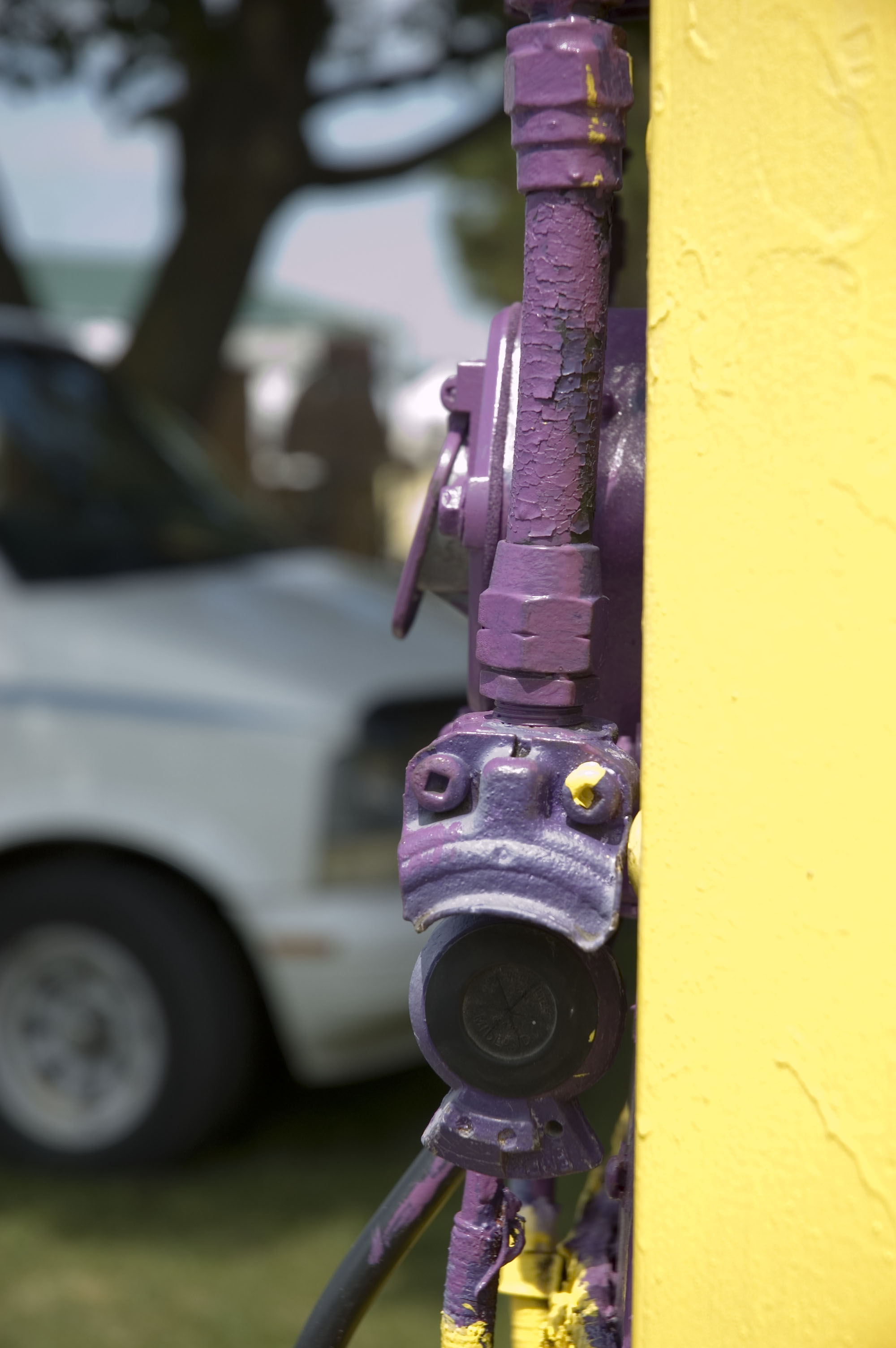
A gladhand connector on a trailer

A gladhand connector or gladhand coupler is an interlocking hose coupling fitted to hoses supplying pressurized air from a tractor unit to air brakes on a semi-trailer, or from a locomotive to railway air brakes on railroad cars. Gladhand connectors resemble a pair of "hands shaking" when interlocked, hence the name.

== Design ==
Gladhands are designed to allow the driver to disconnect without a mechanic or tools. They sometimes utilize a quick release style to speed up brake release time. A tractor / trailer typically has two gladhands - one for service brakes and another for emergency brakes. Gladhands are color coded. In North America, service lines are blue and emergency brake lines are red and are standardized by SAE International's standard SAE J318. Outside North America, the supply lines are red and the control lines are yellow, following International Organization for Standardization's standard ISO 1728. The SAE "service" lines are synonymous with the ISO "control" lines and the "emergency" lines are synonymous with ISO "supply" lines.

Mated rubber grommets provide a positive seal. Gladhand couplers are typically genderless or hermaphroditic, allowing them to be freely connected to each other, for example allowing either end of a railcar to be connected to the end of a train. North America has a system of standardized gladhand sizes.

== See also ==
- Air brake (road vehicle)
- Railway air brake
