= Jonsered Manor =

Coordinates: 57°45′08″N 12°11′04″E

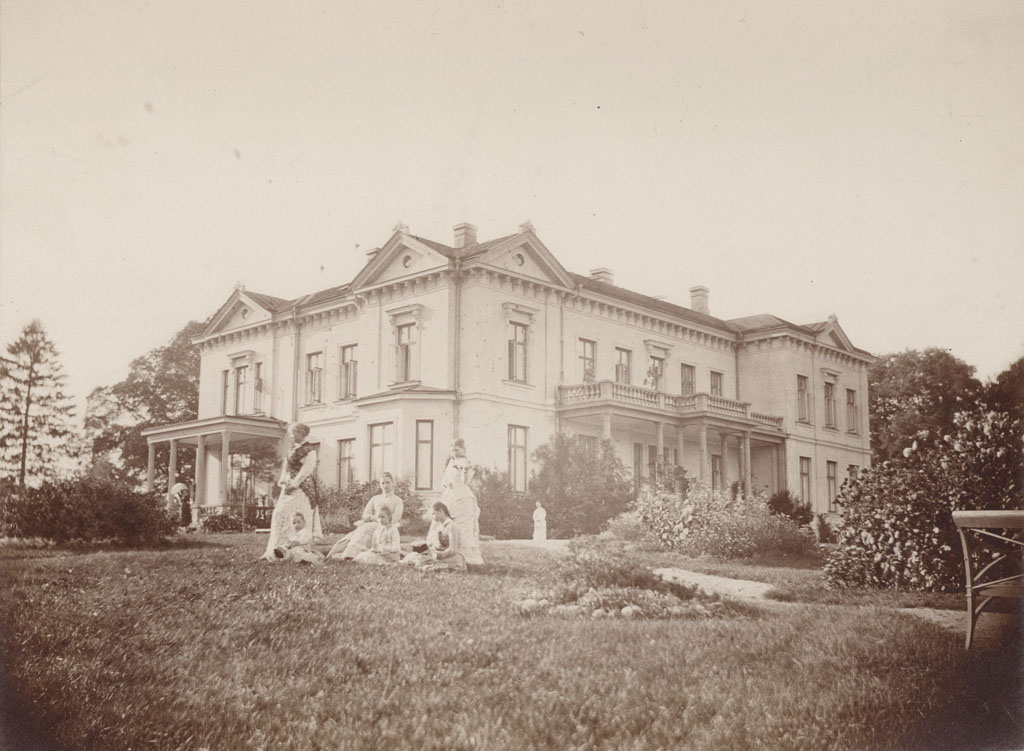
Jonsered Manor in 1881.

Jonsered Manor is a 19th-century manor located in Jonsered, Partille kommun, Sweden. The mansion's garden won the 2015 Elmia Inspira award for 'Sweden's most inspiring park'. Jonsered Manor is now being managed by University of Gothenburg as its cultural and intellectual centre. The centre now hosts events and academic conferences.
