= Gardena (company) =

German gardening tool manufacturer

Gardena GmbH
- Company type: Gesellschaft mit beschränkter Haftung
- Headquarters: Ulm, Germany
- Area served: Europe
- Key people: Pär Åström (President), Joachim Müller
- Products: Garden tools, irrigation-technology
- Revenue: SEK 8,343 million (2019)
- Number of employees: c. 3,000 (2019)
- Parent: Husqvarna Group
- Website: www.gardena.com

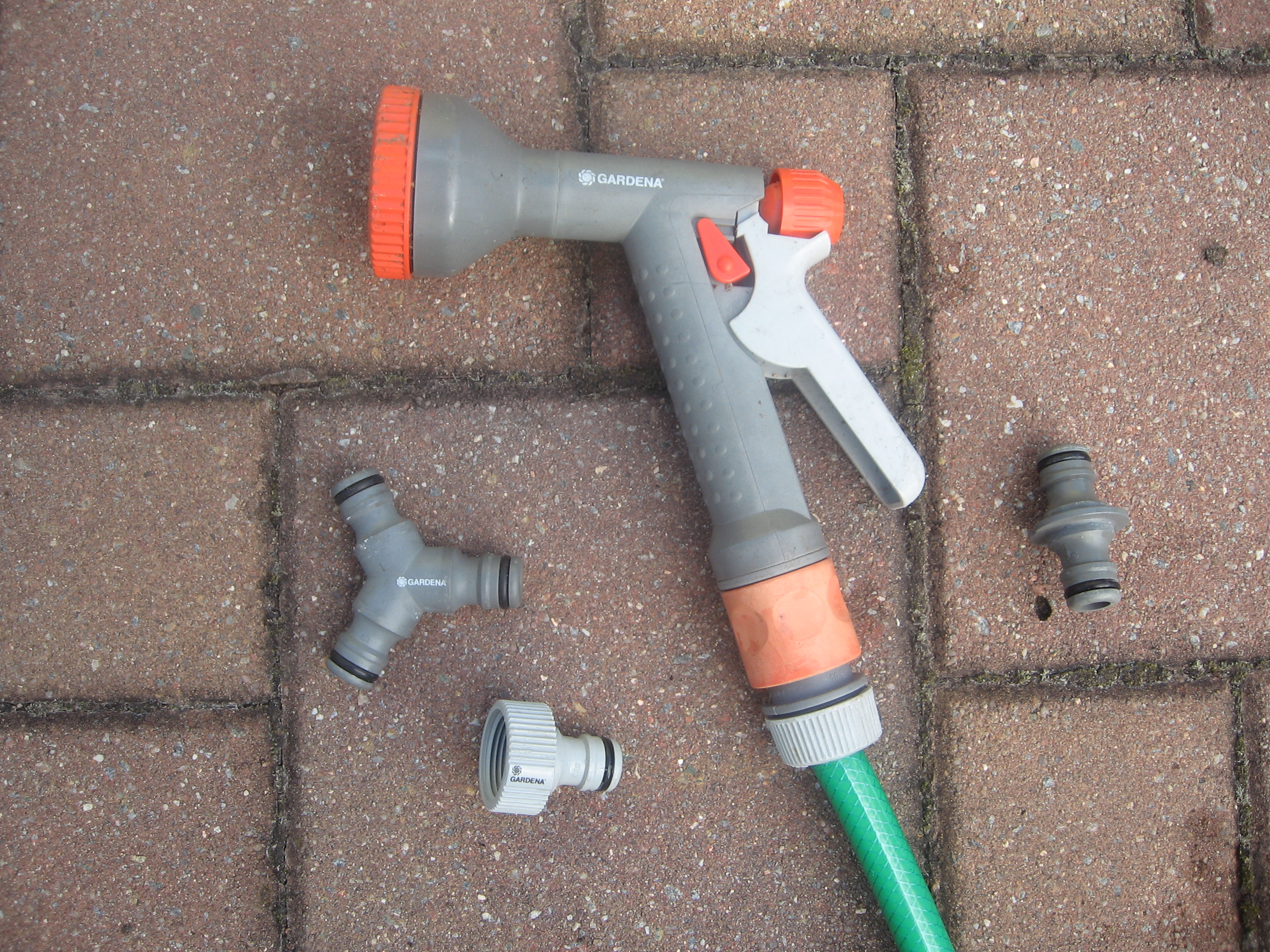
Gardena helped popularize quick-connect garden hose fittings such as these

Video of the smallest robotic lawn mower Sileno City 250 from Gardena, constructed by Husqvarna, in a garden with 40 m^{2}

Gardena GmbH, based in Ulm, Germany, is a manufacturer of gardening tools and has been a subsidiary of the Swedish Husqvarna Group since 2007. With an annual sales of 8,343 million Swedish krona (approximately 790 million euros) in 2019, Gardena is the European market leader.

== Company history ==
In 1961 the company Kress + Kastner GmbH was founded by the merchants Werner Kress and Eberhard Kastner (1928-2004). Five years later the brand name Gardena was created; the company was renamed Gardena Kress + Kastner GmbH. In 1968 the water hose plug-in system (Original GARDENA System) was introduced. The new, patented plug-in coupling became the basis of a whole system of gardening tools. The advantage of the system is that only the rubber O-rings have to be replaced in the event of leaks. The interchangeable handle connection (GARDENA combisystem) followed eight years later. Both were designed by Dieter Raffler, today Professor Emeritus of Industrial Design. Raffler was responsible for the design of Gardena products for 20 years.

The IPO as Gardena Holding AG took place in 1996, and Wolfgang Jahrreiss was the chairman of the board from 1999 to 2004. Three years later, Gardena was acquired from the founding families by IK Partners (formerly Industri Kapital) through the IK 2000 Fund. In 2003, the Gardena shares were delisted and the company was renamed Gardena AG. One year later, the US subsidiary "Melnor Inc." was sold and a new chairman of the board, Martin Bertinchamp, was appointed.

In 2007 Industri Kapital sold Gardena to Husqvarna for 730 million euros. The AG was converted back into a GmbH. As part of a restructuring of the group, the various functional areas were further integrated into the global organization of the Husqvarna Group. Since 2015, the Gardena Division has been managed as a largely independent division of the Group.

== Subsidiaries worldwide ==
Subsidiaries include Gardena Manufacturing GmbH in Ulm (with three manufacturing sites in Germany), Advanced Plastics s.r.o., Vrbno pod Pradědem (with plants in the Czech Republic), Husqvarna Logistics GmbH (formerly hortus GmbH) and Gardena Deutschland GmbH in Ulm (responsible for sales in Germany). In many other countries Gardena is represented by the respective sales companies of the Husqvarna Group.

== See also ==
- Hozelock
