= Kåhög =

- Location within Västra Götaland Location within Sweden
- Coordinates: 57°45′N 12°08′E
- Country: Sweden
- Province: Västergötland
- County: Västra Götaland County
- Municipality: Partille Municipality

Area
  - Total: 0.48 km^{2} (0.19 sq mi)

Population (31 December 2010)
  - Total: 832
  - Density: 1,736/km^{2} (4,500/sq mi)
- Time zone: UTC+1 (CET)
  - Summer (DST): UTC+2 (CEST)

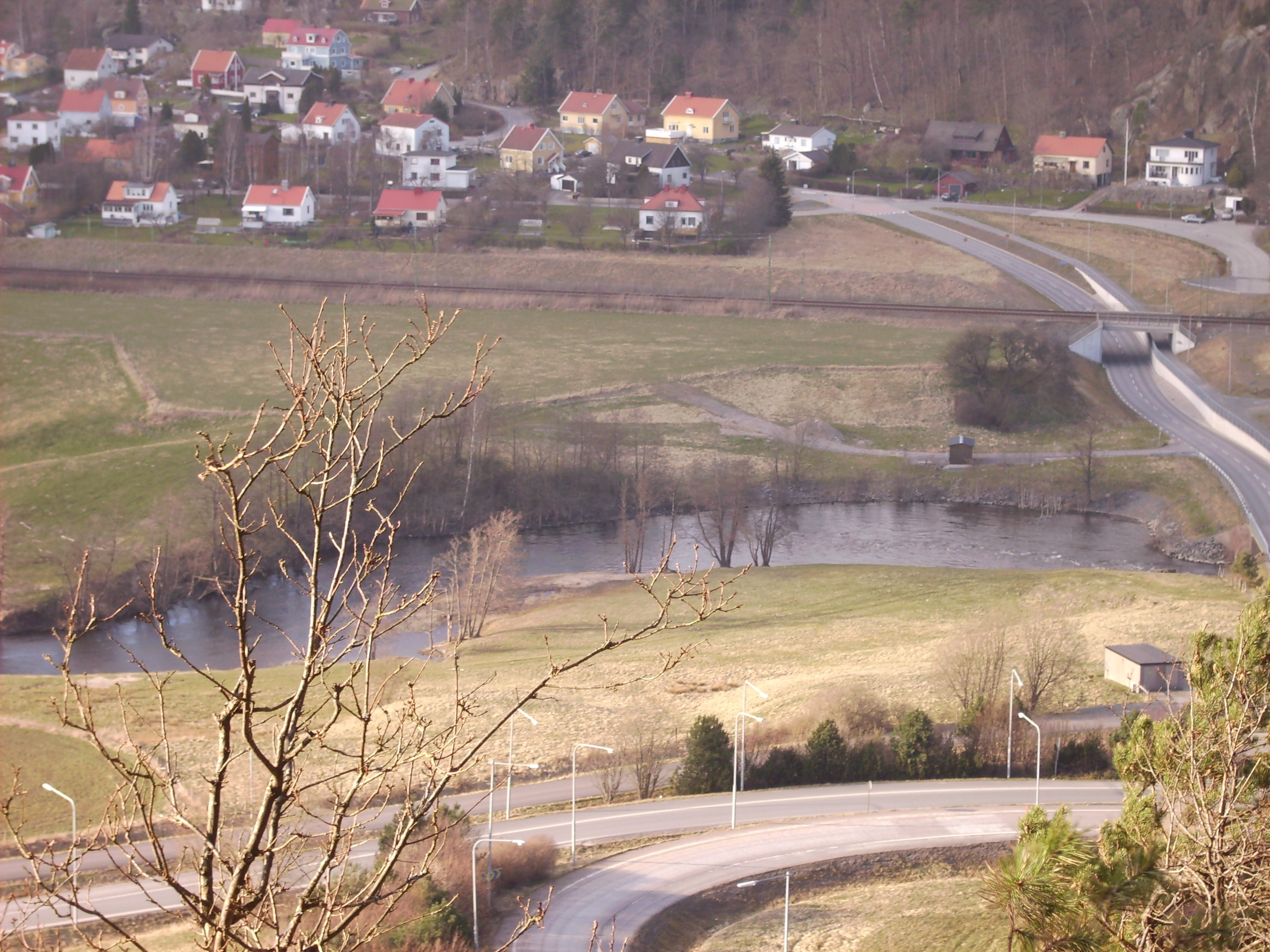
Kåhög, 2007

Kåhög is a locality situated in Partille Municipality, Västra Götaland County, Sweden with 832 inhabitants in 2010.
