= Poulan =

American manufacturer of power equipment

Poulan logo

Poulan is a brand name of the Swedish manufacturer Husqvarna AB.

== History ==
Poulan was founded as Poulan Saw Co. in 1946 by chainsaw pioneer Claude Poulan in Shreveport, Louisiana. Purchased in late 1950s or early '60 by the Beaird Company, also of Shreveport, it was known as Beaird-Poulan. The company was acquired by Emerson Electric in 1972, and was purchased by Electrolux in 1984, which closed its Shreveport factory in 1988. In 2006 Electrolux spun off Husqvarna into its own company. In 2022, a company called Valsi in Mexico purchased tooling from Husqvarna for manufacturing walk behind mowers. Valsi also purchased the rights to manufacture outdoor power equipment under the Poulan Pro brand.

== Poulan brand today ==
The Poulan brand name is used primarily for outdoor power equipment, such as chainsaws, lawn mowers, and leaf blowers, aimed at the mid-level consumer market. Since Poulan is owned by Husqvarna, the two brands often share technologies. In recent years Poulan has offered a more upscale "Poulan Pro" brand employing a black and gold color scheme instead of Poulan's traditional green. As a result, Poulan products have been pushed even further upmarket.
