= Furulund, Partille =

Furulund
- Location within Västra Götaland Location within Sweden
- Coordinates: 57°45′N 12°10′E
- Country: Sweden
- Province: Västergötland
- County: Västra Götaland County
- Municipality: Partille Municipality
  - Density: 1/km^{2} (2.6/sq mi)
- Time zone: UTC+1 (CET)
  - Summer (DST): UTC+2 (CEST)

Furulund is a locality situated in Partille Municipality, Västra Götaland County, Sweden

Furulund is located on the hill to the south, along the road between the E20 in the suburbs and Riksväg 40 in Landvetter. In the community there is an elementary school Furulund School ("Furan" for grades 1-5 and "Lunden" for grades 6-9), Furulund Church, retirement homes, grocery store (Matöppet), hairdresser, pizzeria and two kiosks.

Furulund is surrounded by forests. In west the forest continues about 8 km to Gothenburgs eastern part (over the nature reserves and Knipeflågsbergen Delsjö area). In the east the forest stretches all the way to municipal boundary of Lerum and Härryda. In the south is an area called Åstebo with stables and Partille Hostel, and the lake Kåsjön, with a popular beach for the local population.

Almost directly west of Furulunds Centrum lies the lake Prästtjärnen and South East lies the lake Maderna.

The buildings in Furulund has grown large over the last 30 years. Since Furulund is located over 100 meters higher than Gothenburg and many days the temperature is around 0, so Furulund usually have more snow, which remains longer than in the valley in Partille.

== Sports ==
The following sports clubs are located in Furulund:

- Björndammens BK
- IK Sävehof

== Gallery ==
Furulund and surroundings

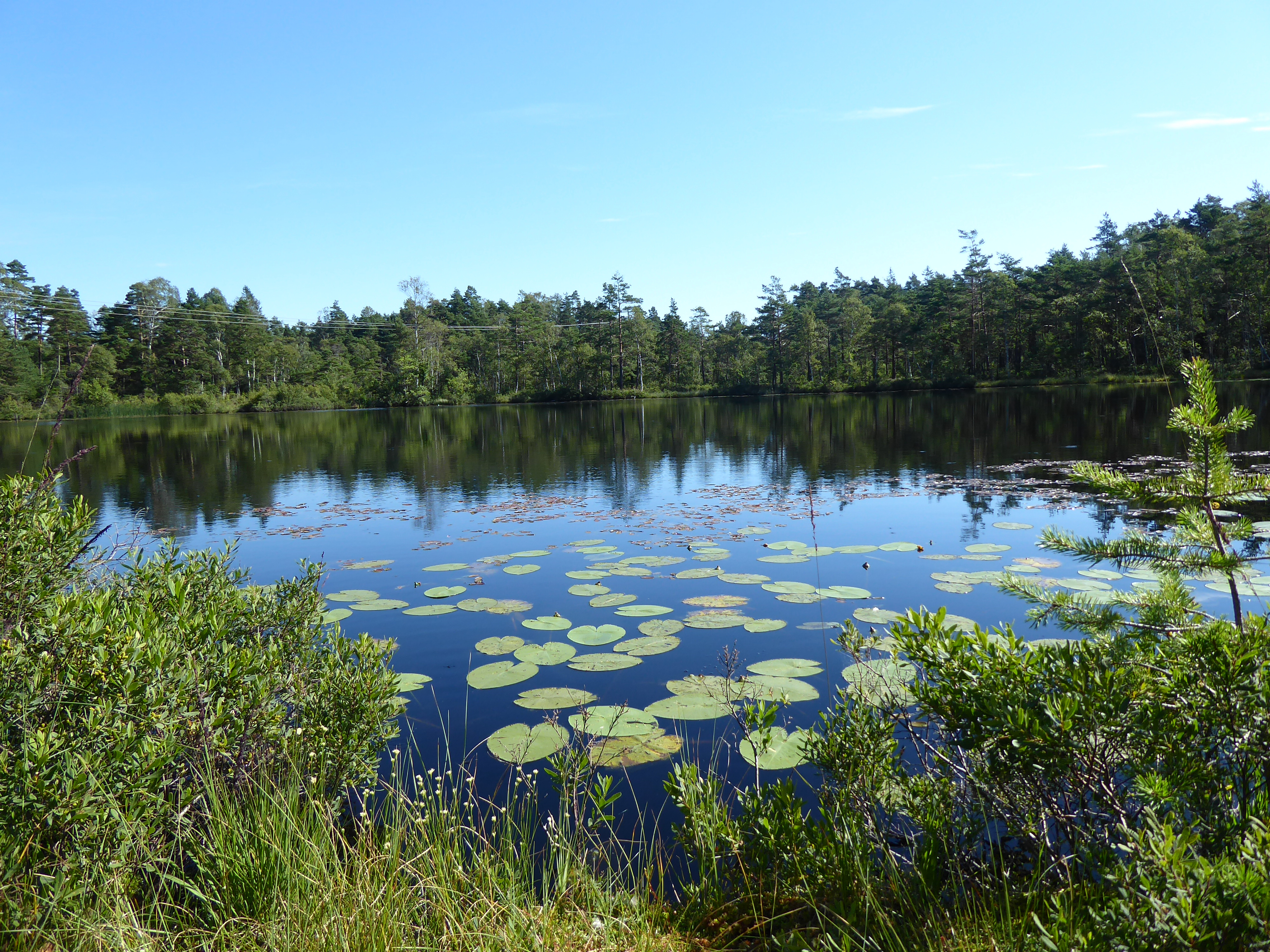
Åstebotjärnen from SW on August 1, 2020.

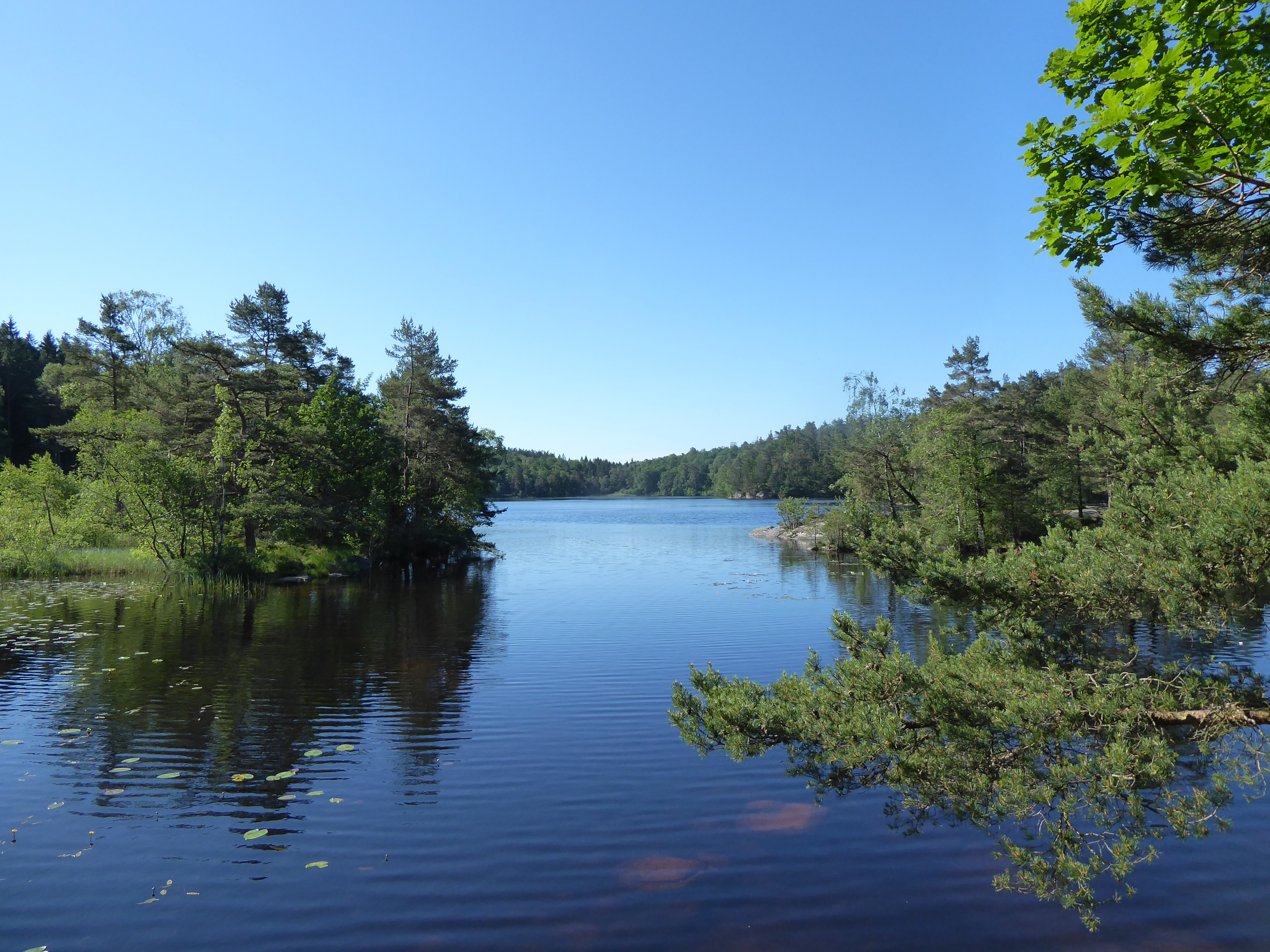
Prästtjärnen from N on June 14, 2020.

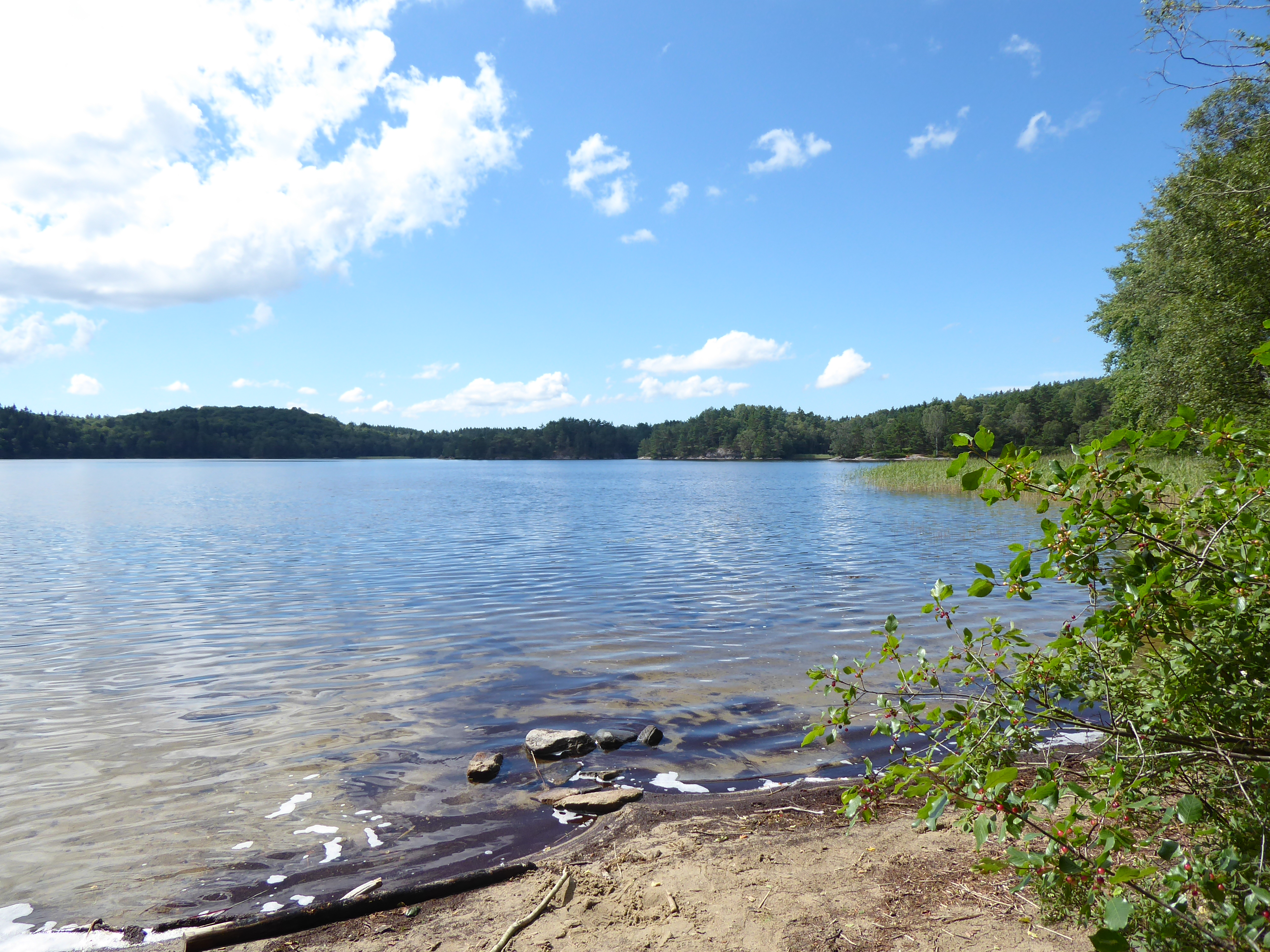
Kåsjön from N on August 1, 2020.

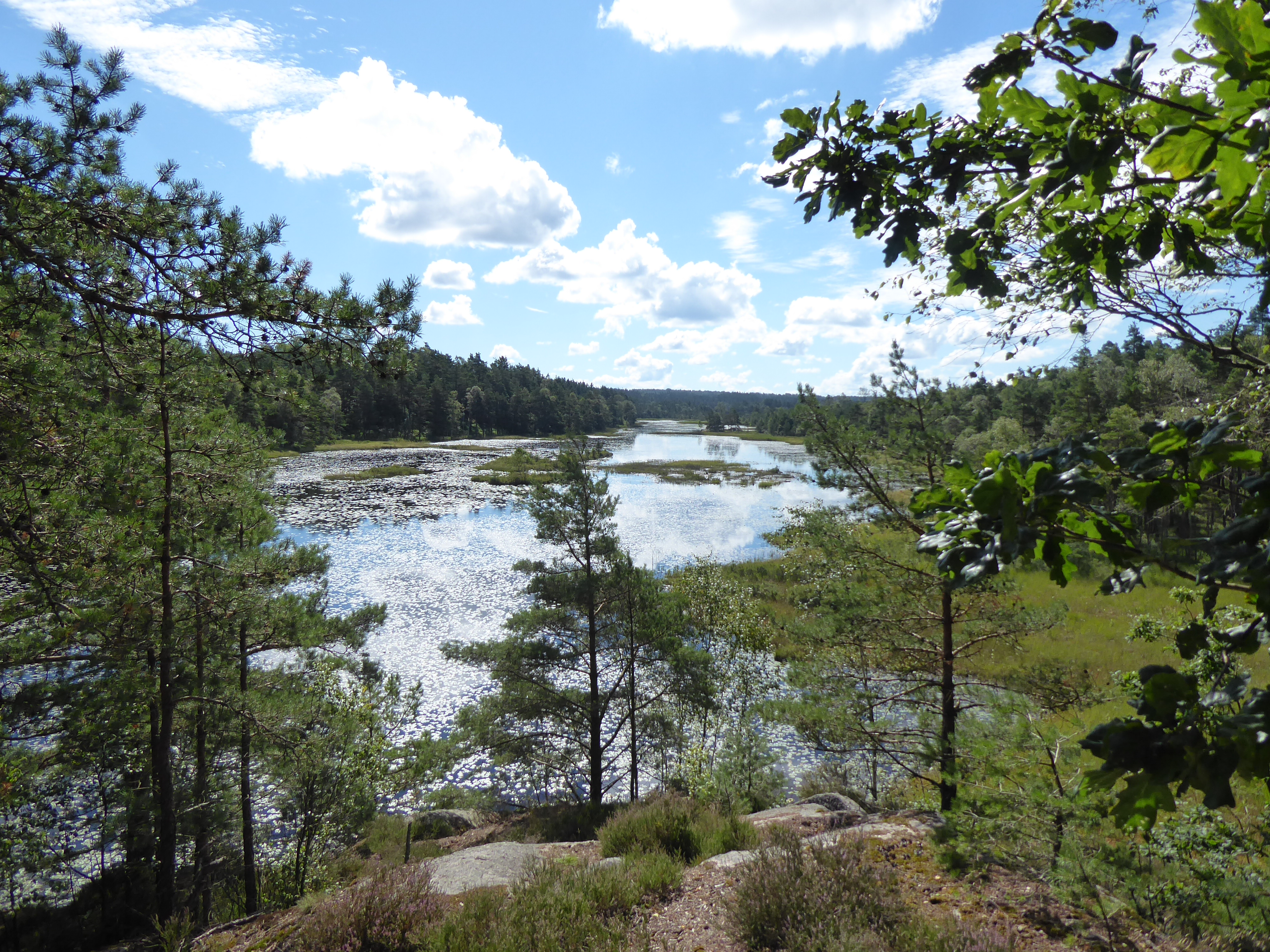
Maderna from NW, direction S, on August 1, 2020.

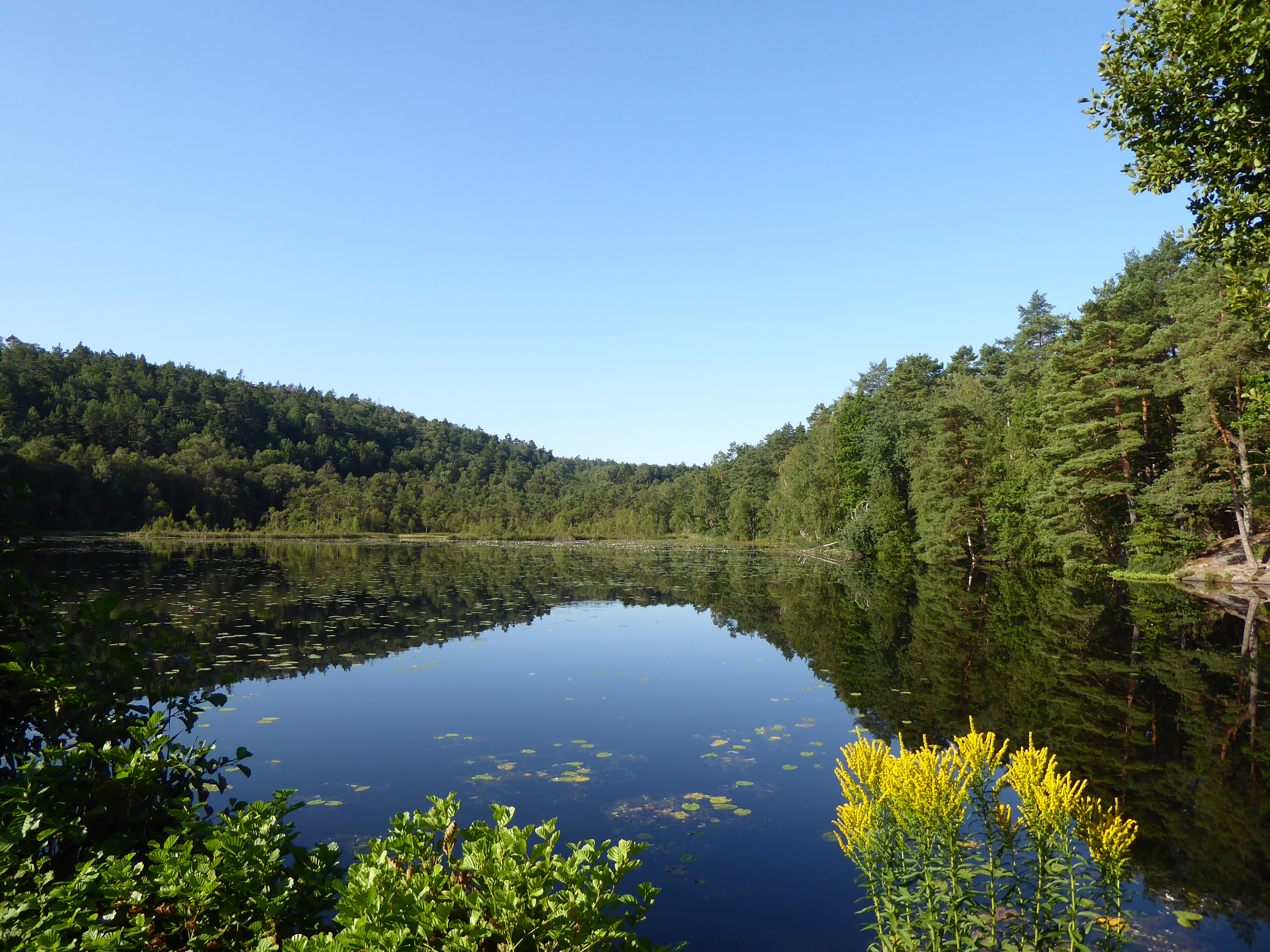
Björndammen from NE on August 15, 2020.
