= Jonsereds Fabrikers AB =

Outdoor chainsaw brand

Jonsered

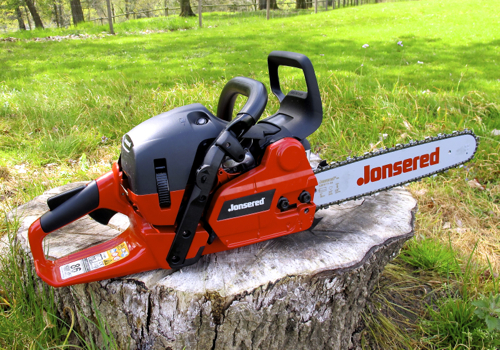
- Jonsered chainsaw
- Product type: Outdoor equipment
- Current owner: Husqvarna AB
- Country: Sweden
- Introduced: 1832; 194 years ago in Jonsered, Sweden
- Previous owners: AB Asken (1975-1978); Electrolux
- Website: www.jonsered.com/int/

Jonsered is a brand of chainsaws and other equipment, owned by Husqvarna AB.

== History ==
The Scotsman William Gibson, who had immigrated to Sweden in his youth, founded a textile mill in 1832 in Jonsered. His sons later took over the company that remained in the family's control until the 1920s. In 1872 the company became a limited company, Jonsered Fabriker AB, diversifying its textile output. By the 1880s it was producing and exporting woodworking machines along with its textiles, with one notable production being canvas. The Jonsered sailing canvas was very well known in the 1800s in Sweden and gave the company a good reputation. Another important textile product were fire hoses (until 1975), many of them still in use today.

In the 1950s Jonsereds Fabrikers AB started producing the chain saw model "Raket" (Rocket) which, along with its successors, became a major success and Jonsereds started exporting chain saws worldwide with the biggest export market being North America. Another success was the forest crane production that started about 1959. The most profitable unit was the tarpaulin production. In 1969 the company started to shut down its textile part and evolving into a pure engineering industry with customers in the forest industry as the main customer group, with the tarpaulin unit being kept within the company.

In 1975 it became a subsidiary of Investment AB Asken. Asken came in financial difficulties and parts of Jonsereds AB were shut down and others sold. In 1978 it was sold to Electrolux and production of chainsaws was later moved to Husqvarna. Husqvarna still maintains an R&D unit in Jonsered. The tarpaulin unit was also acquired by Electrolux but later sold. The brand "Jonsereds" is still in use by its current owner Hallbyggarna.

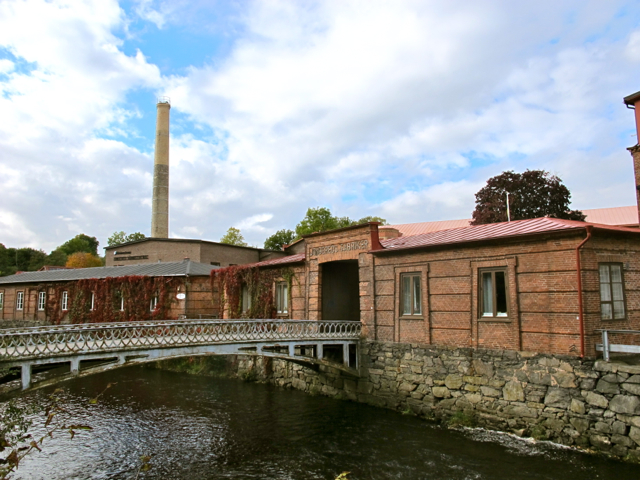
The old entrance to Jonsereds Fabriker

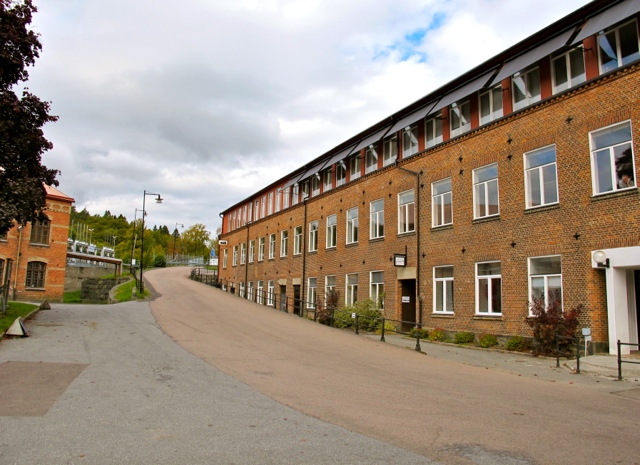
The former headquarters in Jonsered

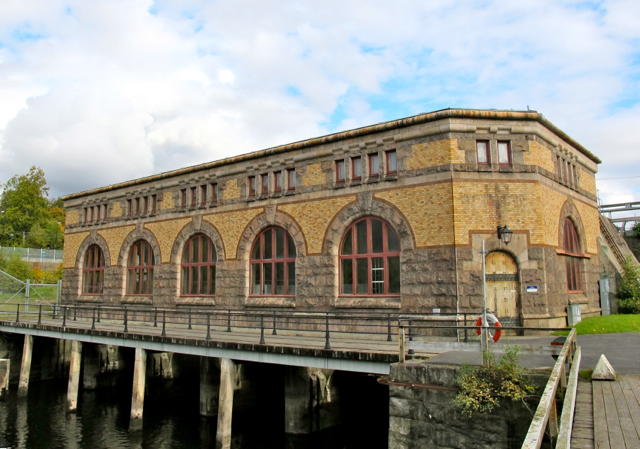
Jonsereds Fabriker's hydro power station
