= Claude Poulan =

Claude Casper Poulan (1915–1995) of Monroe, Louisiana, was the founder of Poulan Chain Saws and the inventor of the bow guide.

In 1944, Poulan was supervising German prisoners cutting pulpwood in East Texas. At the time this task required three men, two to operate the chainsaw, and a third to operate a pry pole, utilized to keep the chain from binding as it cut through the trees. Poulan utilized an old truck fender and fashioned it into a curved piece utilized to guide the chain. The "bow guide" now allowed the chainsaw to be utilized by a single operator and quickly revolutionized the booming, post-war wood cutting industry.

In 1946 Poulan Chain Saws was established in Shreveport, Louisiana, where it produced chainsaws utilizing existing engines purchased from other manufacturers. In 1951, Poulan began production of its own internally developed and manufactured chainsaws.
