= Garden hose =

Flexible tube used to convey water

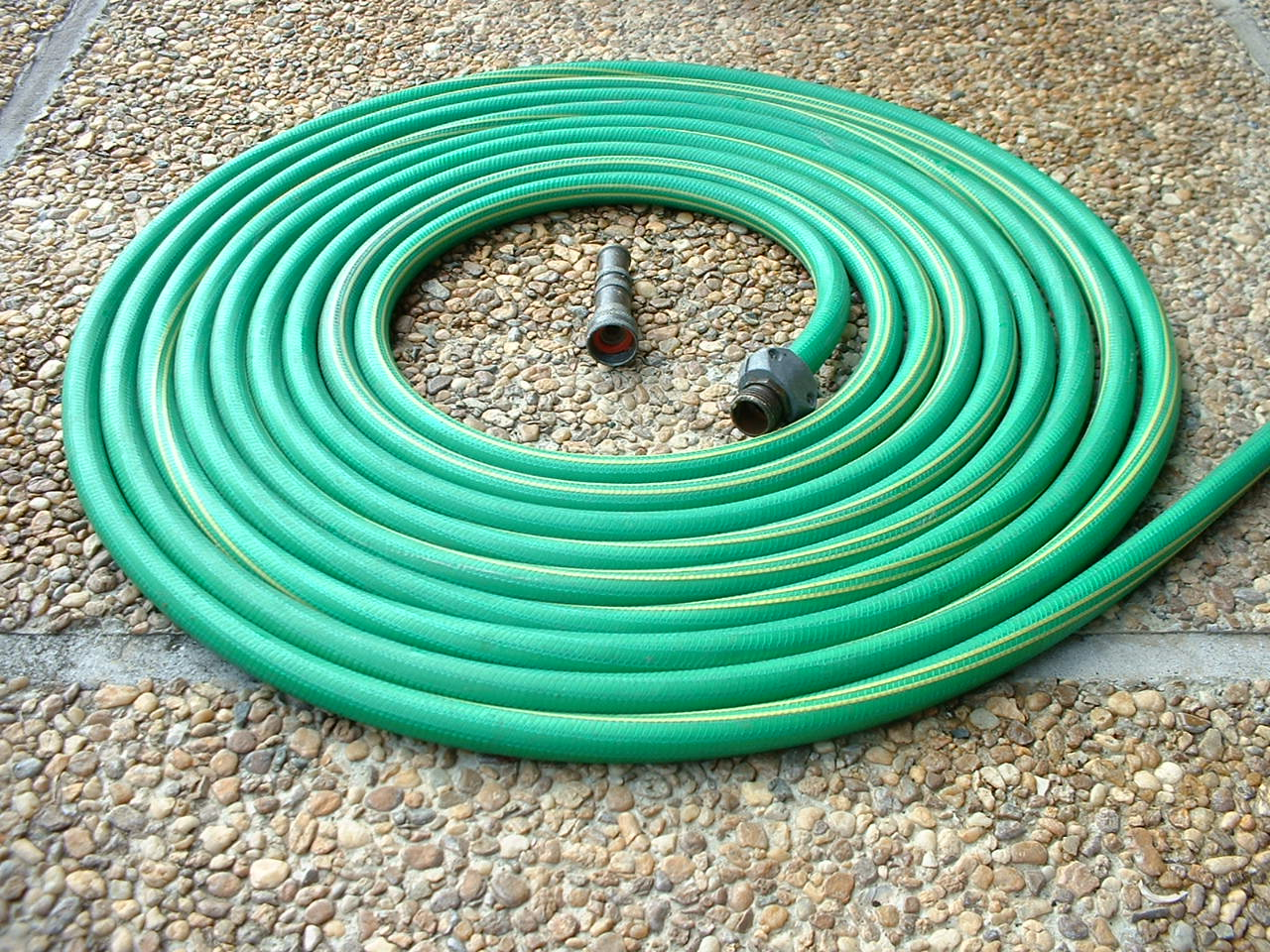
A coiled garden hose

A garden hose, hosepipe, or simply hose is a flexible tube used to convey water. There are a number of common attachments available for the end of the hose, such as sprayers and sprinklers (which are used to concentrate water at one point or to spread it over a large area). Hoses are usually attached to a hose spigot or tap.

== Terminology ==
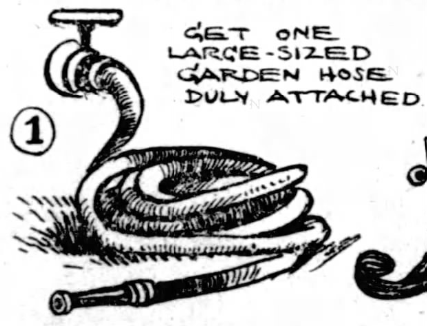
A garden hose in a cartoon from 1916

The alternative term "hosepipe" is a chiefly British, South African, and southern US usage; "hose" or "garden hose" is the predominant term in other English-speaking areas. The term "hose" is also used for other types of flexible, water-carrying tubes such as fire hose used by fire departments.

== Description ==
Garden hoses are typically made of extruded synthetic rubber or soft plastic, often reinforced with an internal web of fibers. As a result of these materials, garden hoses are flexible and their smooth exterior facilitates pulling them past trees, posts and other obstacles. Garden hoses are also generally tough enough to survive occasional scraping on rocks and being stepped on, without damage or leaking.

Each male end of a typical garden hose can mate with the female connector on another, which allows multiple garden hoses to be linked end-to-end to increase their overall length. Small rubber or plastic washers (often confusingly called "hose washers") are used in female ends to prevent leakage, because the threads are not tapered and are not used to create a seal.

Most garden hoses are not rated for use with hot water; even leaving certain hoses in the sun while pressurized can cause them to burst.

Hoses used to carry potable water are typically made of NSF International-listed polymers tested and shown not to leach harmful materials into the drinking water, such as the plasticizers (phthalates) used in polyvinyl chloride (PVC, or vinyl) hoses.

== Use ==
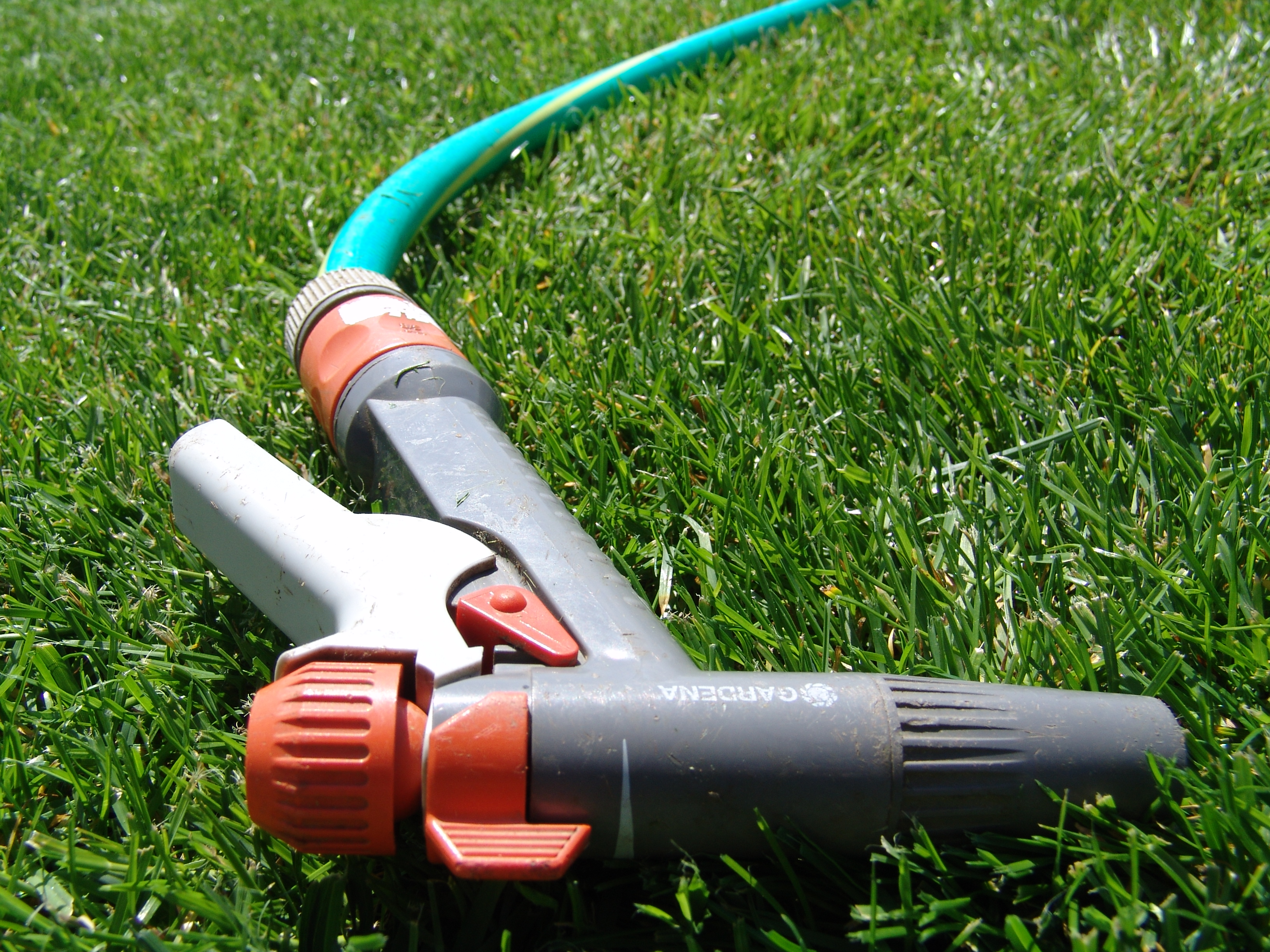
Sprayer pistol uses a quick-connect fitting, visible just beyond the sprayer grip

As implied by the name, garden hoses are commonly used to transport water for gardening, lawn care, and other landscaping purposes. They are also used for outdoor cleaning of items such as vehicles, equipment, building exteriors, and animals. NSF-approved hoses may be used for connecting drinkable water to recreational vehicles and trailers.

Whenever a flexible hose is connected to a drinkable water supply, the spigot or tap should be fitted with an approved backflow prevention device, to prevent contaminated water from being siphoned back, in the event of a pressure drop. Many water suppliers require this, and plumbing code may legally require permanently installed backflow preventers.

== Porous or perforated soaker hoses ==
Special hoses designed to leak throughout their length are sometimes used to gently distribute water on a lawn or garden. These hoses have either many small holes drilled or punched in them, or are made of a porous material, such as sintered rubber particles. These "soaker hoses" are a simple, low-cost, substitute for a drip irrigation system.

== Expandable hoses ==
These differ from traditional hoses in that the inner membrane expands when filled with water, much like a balloon. An outer cover protects the delicate expandable membrane from punctures. Such hoses "grow" when pressurized, and shrink back down when the pressure is released, allowing for easier storage.

== Standards and connectors ==
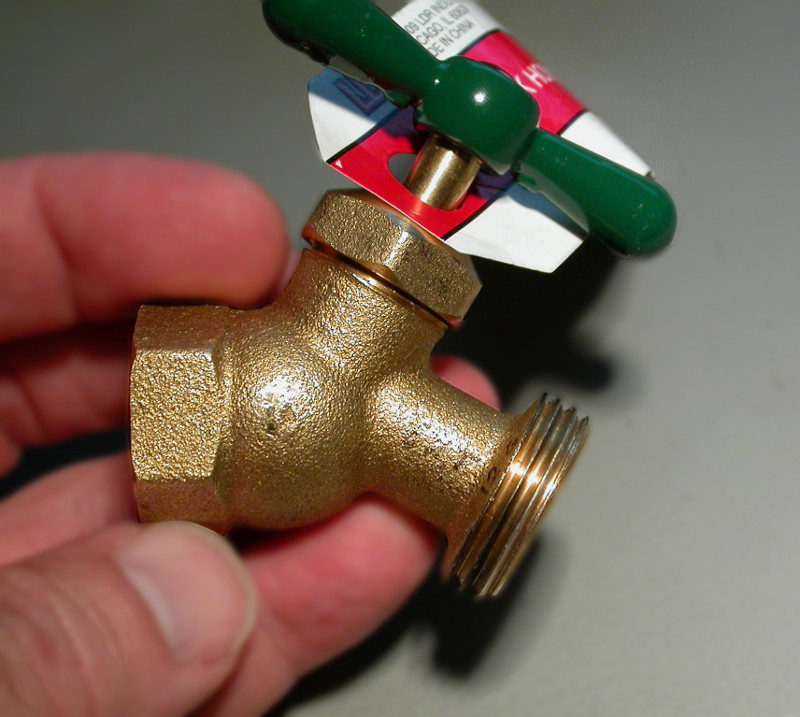
Brass hose spigot with threads for garden hose (GHT) visible on the right

Garden hoses connect using a male/female thread connection. The technical term for this arrangement is a "hose union". Spigots or sillcocks have male hose connectors only, and the mating end of a hose has a captive nut which fits the threads there.

The thread standard for garden hose connectors in the United States, its territories, and Canada is known colloquially as "garden hose thread" (GHT), but its official designation is NH ("National Hose"):

- 3/4-11.5NH designates full form threads as produced by cutting material such as the brass spigot outlet or hose male or female end fitting found on more expensive hoses.
- 3/4-11.5NHR designates thin-walled couplers produced by rolling thin material, usually brass, typically found on less expensive hoses.
- 3/4-14NPSH designates female hose ends that mate a hose to a tapered pipe thread without a spigot.

The US standard was defined by NFPA 1963, "Standard for Fire Hose Connections", then later by ANSI-ASME B1.20.7, which specifies 1 1/16 inches (27 mm) diameter straight (non-tapered) thread with a pitch of 11.5 threads per inch (TPI). The female thread is abbreviated FHT (for "female hose thread"), and the male part is abbreviated MHT (for "male hose thread"). This fitting is used with 1/2-inch, 5/8-inch, and 3/4-inch hoses.

In other countries, a British Standard Pipe (BSP) thread is used, which is 3/4 inch (19 mm) and 14 TPI (male part outside diameter is 26.441 mm or 1.04 in). The GHT and BSP standards are not compatible, and attempting to connect a GHT hose to a BSP fitting, or vice versa, will damage the threads.

The connector threads are not tapered, and do not seal against leaks. Instead, a pliable rubber or plastic gasket (often ambiguously called a "garden hose washer") seals the connection against leakage. A variant of this gasket also incorporates a fine-meshed metal or plastic screen to filter out small particles of dirt that may be present in the flowing stream of water. The purpose of this filter is to intercept debris which could otherwise clog the small openings used to disperse a spray of water from various garden sprayers and sprinklers.

Adaptors made of metal or plastic are available to interconnect GHT, BSP, NPT, hose barb, and quick-connect fittings.

== Quick connectors ==
In the 1980s, the use of quick-connector systems became increasingly popular. These are fittings that attach to the hose and or screw into common hose connectors and equipment, allowing hoses and accessories to be easily connected together using a snap-fit type system. The first plastic connector was invented in the UK by Hozelock in 1959, and the style has now become a de facto standard throughout Europe and the wider world, compatible with and imitated by many other manufacturers.

Other manufacturers (for example, GEKA & Hoselink) have designed non-threaded hermaphroditic quick-connect hose fittings (see hose couplings). These have the advantage of interconnecting without requiring different "male" and "female" connectors.

Some connectors also incorporate an "autostop" feature. This is an internal valve which is shut off by water pressure, and it is opened only by connecting a fitting or appliance; thus, disconnecting a hose fitted with this adaptor will automatically stop the flow of water. This eases connecting and changing appliances without the need to shut off the water first.

== Health risks from aerosols ==
In 2014, it was reported that use of common garden hoses in combination with spray nozzles may generate aerosols containing droplets smaller than 10 μm, which can be inhaled by nearby people. Water stagnating in a hose between uses, especially when warmed by the sun, can host the growth and interaction of Legionella and free-living amoebae (FLA) as biofilms on the inner surface of the hose. Clinical cases of Legionnaires' disease or Pontiac fever have been found to be associated with inhalation of garden hose aerosols containing Legionella bacteria. The report provided measured microbial densities resulting from controlled hose conditions in order to quantify the human health risks. The densities of Legionella spp. identified in two types of hoses were found to be similar to those reported during legionellosis outbreaks from other causes. It was proposed that the risk could be mitigated by draining hoses after use.

== Gallery ==
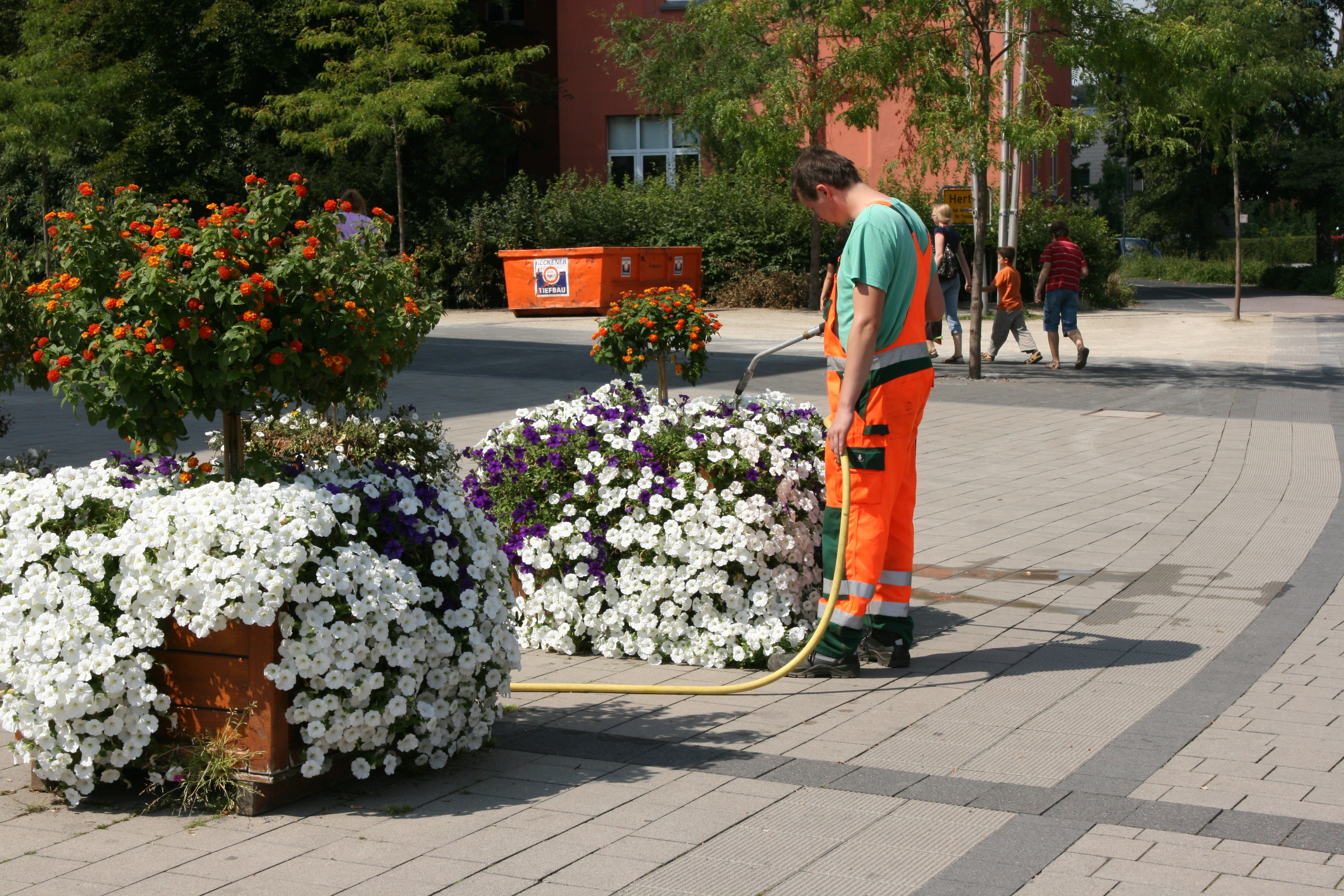
Garden hose in use (Germany)

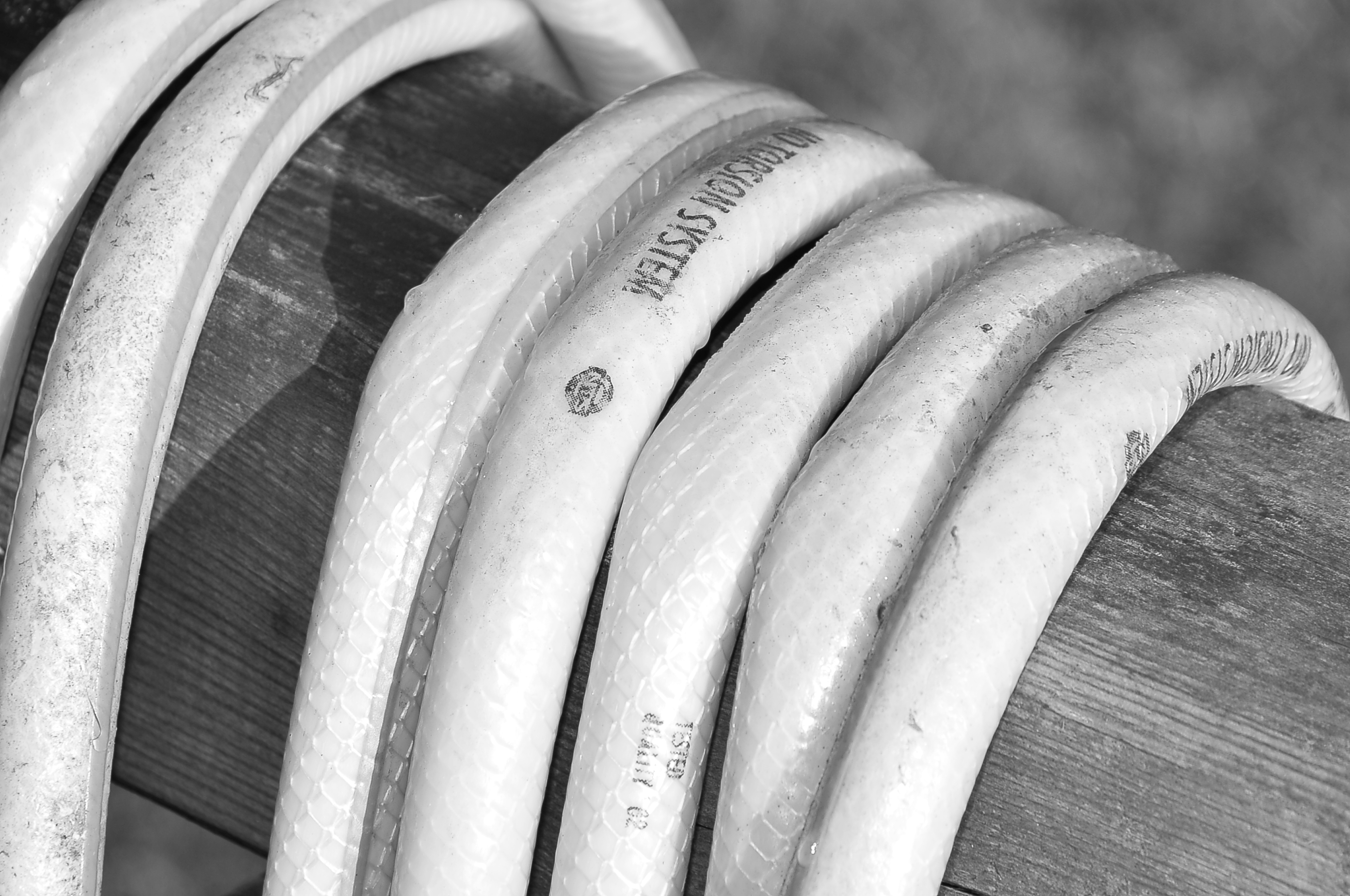
Closeup of a garden hose shows the crisscrossed fiber reinforcements

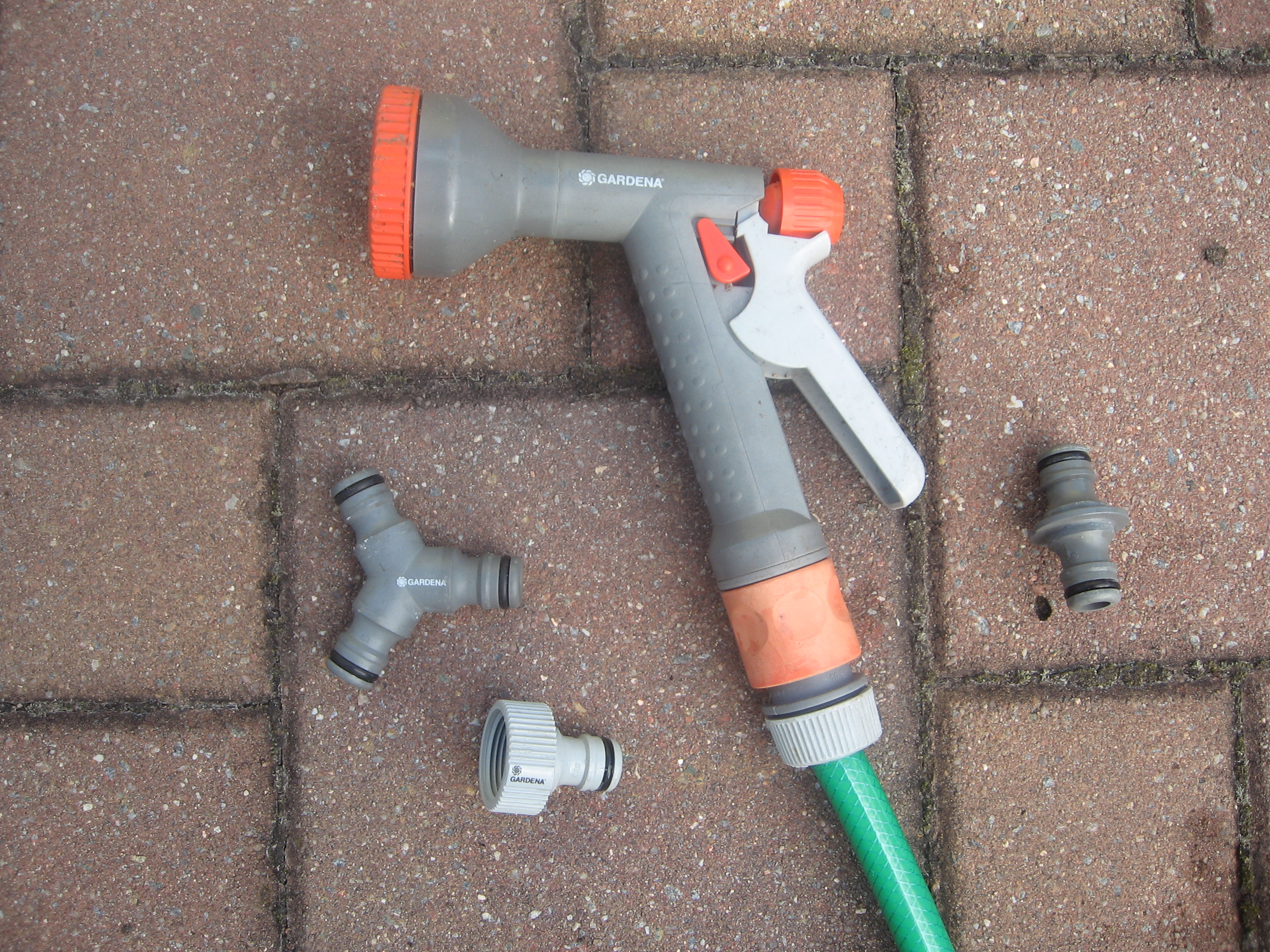
Gardena quick-connect hose fittings

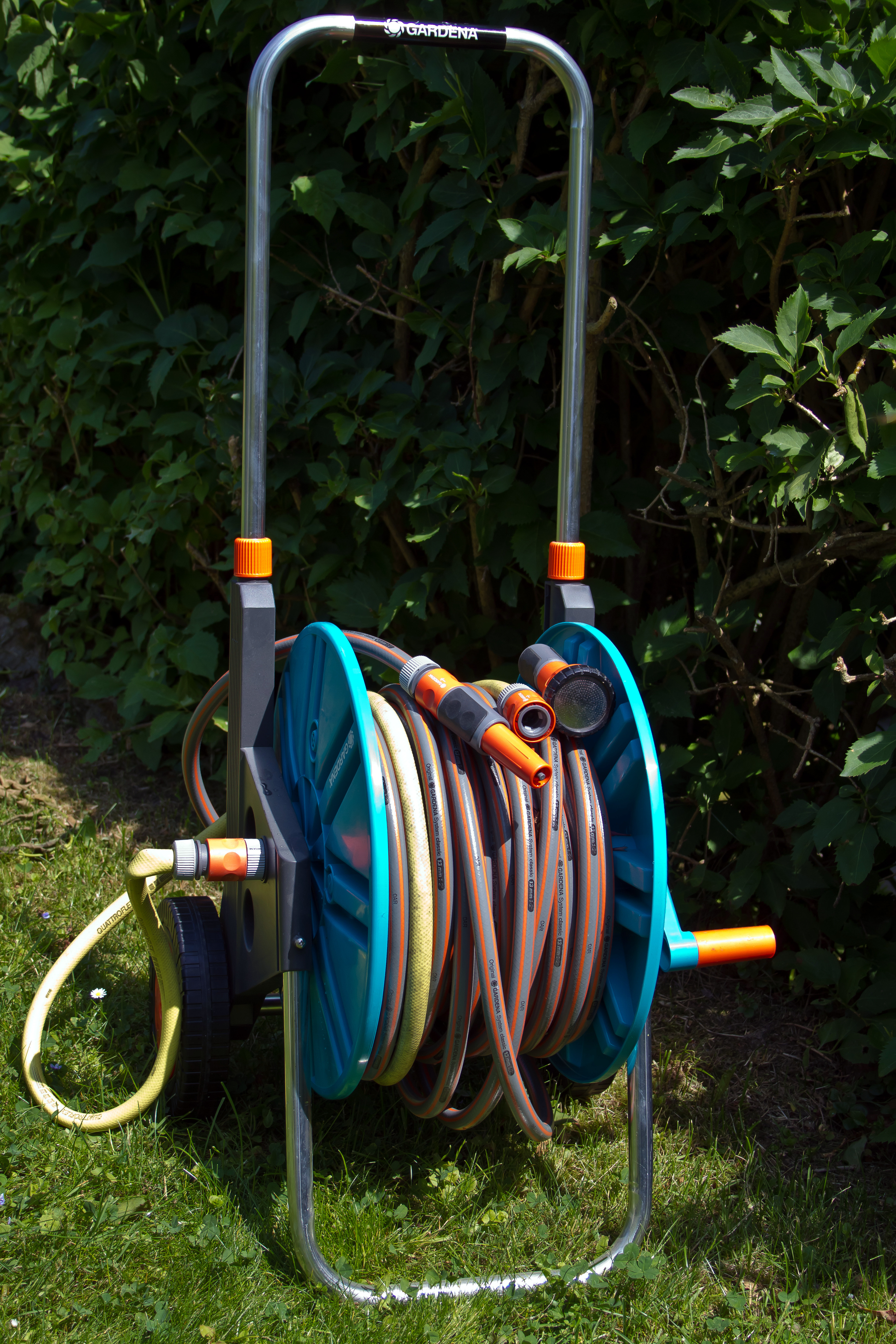
Hose cart and some quick-connect fittings

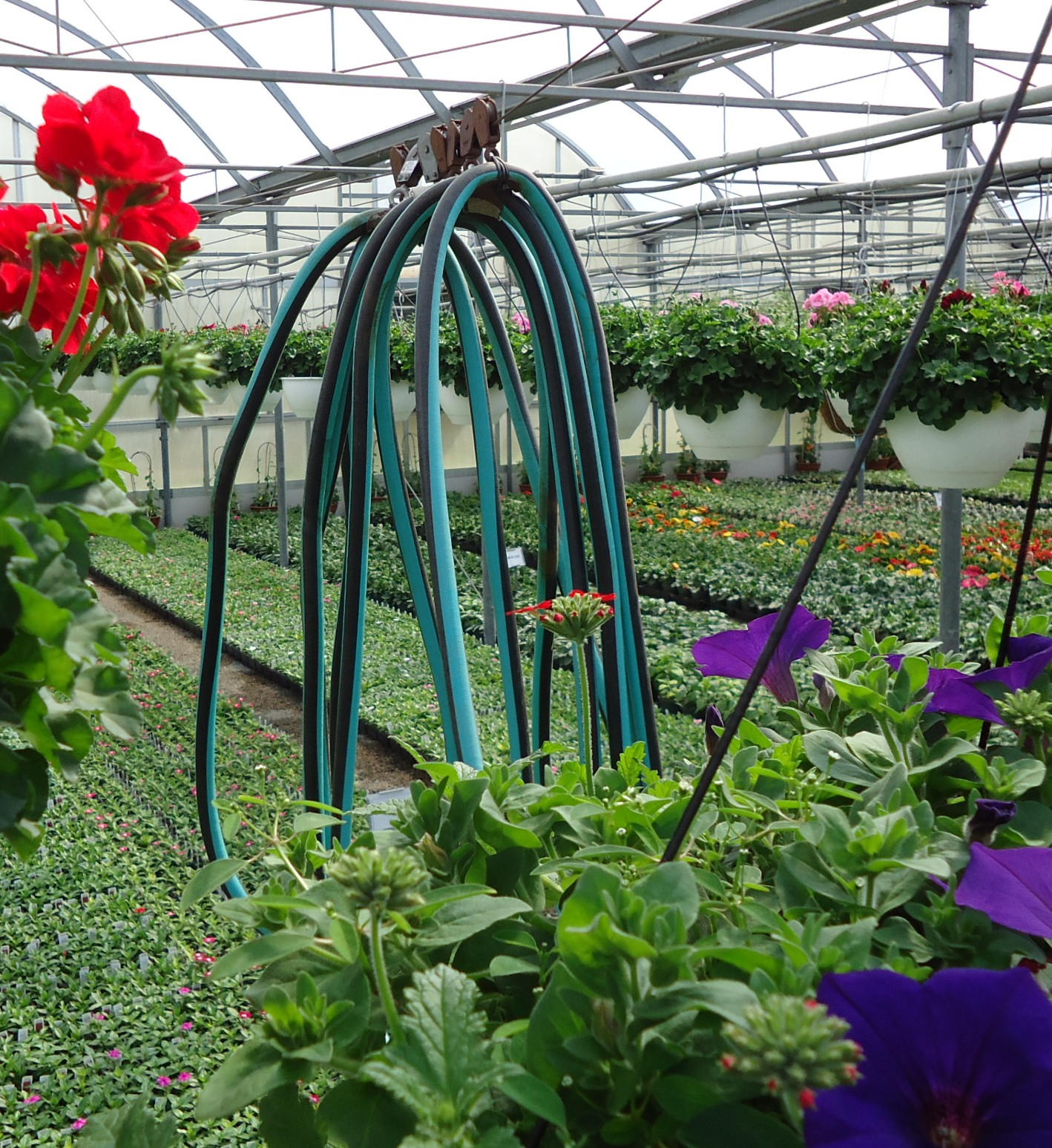
This greenhouse is equipped with a hose suspended on pulleys.

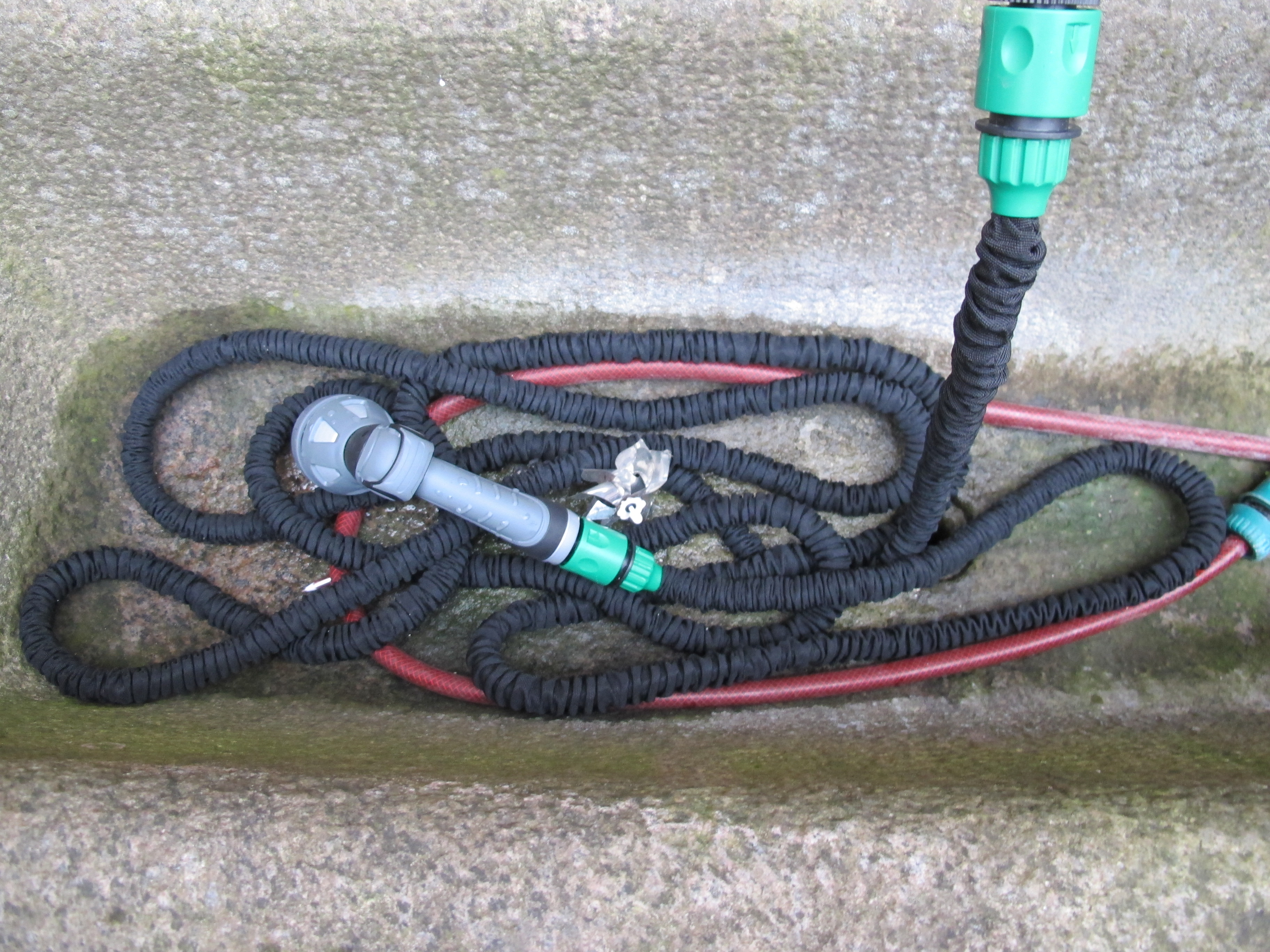
Special expandable hose can be stretched to reach farther.

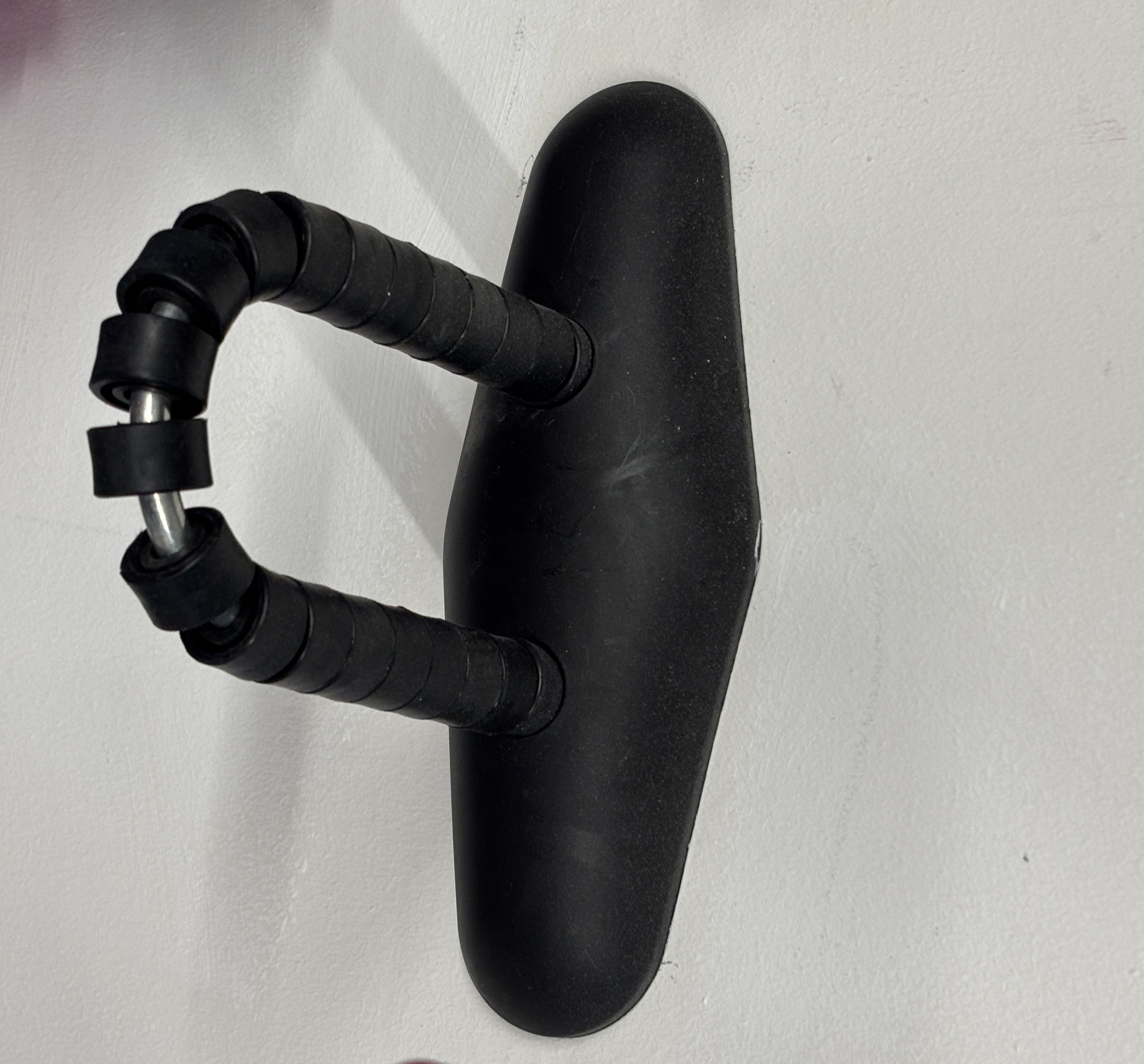
Hose guides can be used to make it easier to drag garden hoses around corners

== See also ==
- Drip irrigation
- Fire hose
- Hose coupling
- Outdoor water-use restriction, or "hosepipe ban"
