= Jonsered =

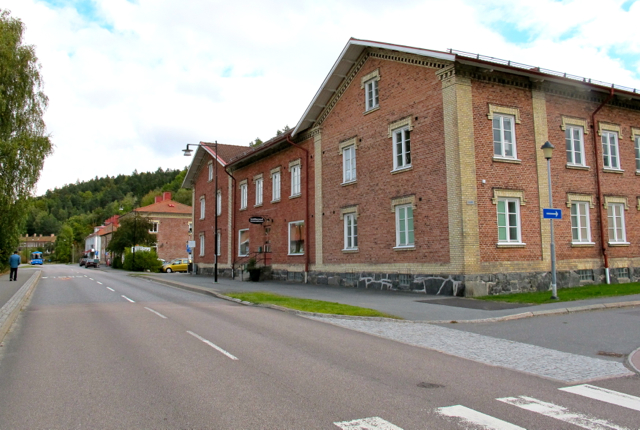
- Jonsered in September 2013

- Location within Västra Götaland Location within Sweden
- Coordinates: 57°45′N 12°10′E
- Country: Sweden
- Province: Västergötland
- County: Västra Götaland County
- Municipality: Partille Municipality

Area
  - Total: 0.64 km^{2} (0.25 sq mi)

Population (31 December 2010)
  - Total: 930
  - Density: 1,458/km^{2} (3,780/sq mi)
- Time zone: UTC+1 (CET)
  - Summer (DST): UTC+2 (CEST)

Jonsered (Swedish pronunciation: [ˈjɔ̌nːsɛrɛd]) is a locality situated in Partille Municipality, Västra Götaland County, Sweden with 930 inhabitants in 2010.

Jonsered is an old, traditional industrial community by the Säve river outside Gothenburg in Sweden. Jonsered's factories were established here in 1834 by the Scotsman William Gibson (1783–1857). One of the first major products was sail canvas. In 1856 the first Swedish state railway was inaugurated between Gothenburg and Jonsered later being built all the way up to Stockholm. Jonsered was dominated by the Gibson family until the 1920s but the company remained the driving force of the community, being the main landowner until the 1970s.

By the 1880s the manufacture of wood processing machinery had started, leading towards the products Jonsered manufactures today. In the 1950s Jonsered started production of chainsaws which became a worldwide success and helped the company when the textile industry was shut down in the late 1960s. The manufacturer Jonsered (now a brand of Husqvarna AB) once had plants here but production was closed in 1984 by Electrolux which had bought the company in 1979 and moved its production to Husqvarna.

The community changed after the closure of Jonsereds fabriker transforming into a suburb for commuters working in Gothenburg and Partille. Jonsered can be reached with commuter trains through the train station that was opened in 2000.

== Sports ==
The football club Jonsereds IF has previously played in the higher divisions, in the 1990s the club played in the Swedish 2nd division. The club has produced many talented players, the most well known in later years being Torbjörn Nilsson.
