= Öjersjö =

- Location within Västra Götaland Location within Sweden
- Coordinates: 57°42′N 12°07′E
- Country: Sweden
- Province: Västergötland
- County: Västra Götaland County
- Municipality: Partille Municipality

Area
  - Total: 1.93 km^{2} (0.75 sq mi)

Population (31 December 2010)
  - Total: 3,543
  - Density: 1,832/km^{2} (4,740/sq mi)
- Time zone: UTC+1 (CET)
  - Summer (DST): UTC+2 (CEST)

Öjersjö is a locality situated in Partille Municipality, Västra Götaland County, Sweden with 3,543 inhabitants in 2010.
