= Partille Municipality =

Partille Municipality Partille kommun
- Municipality
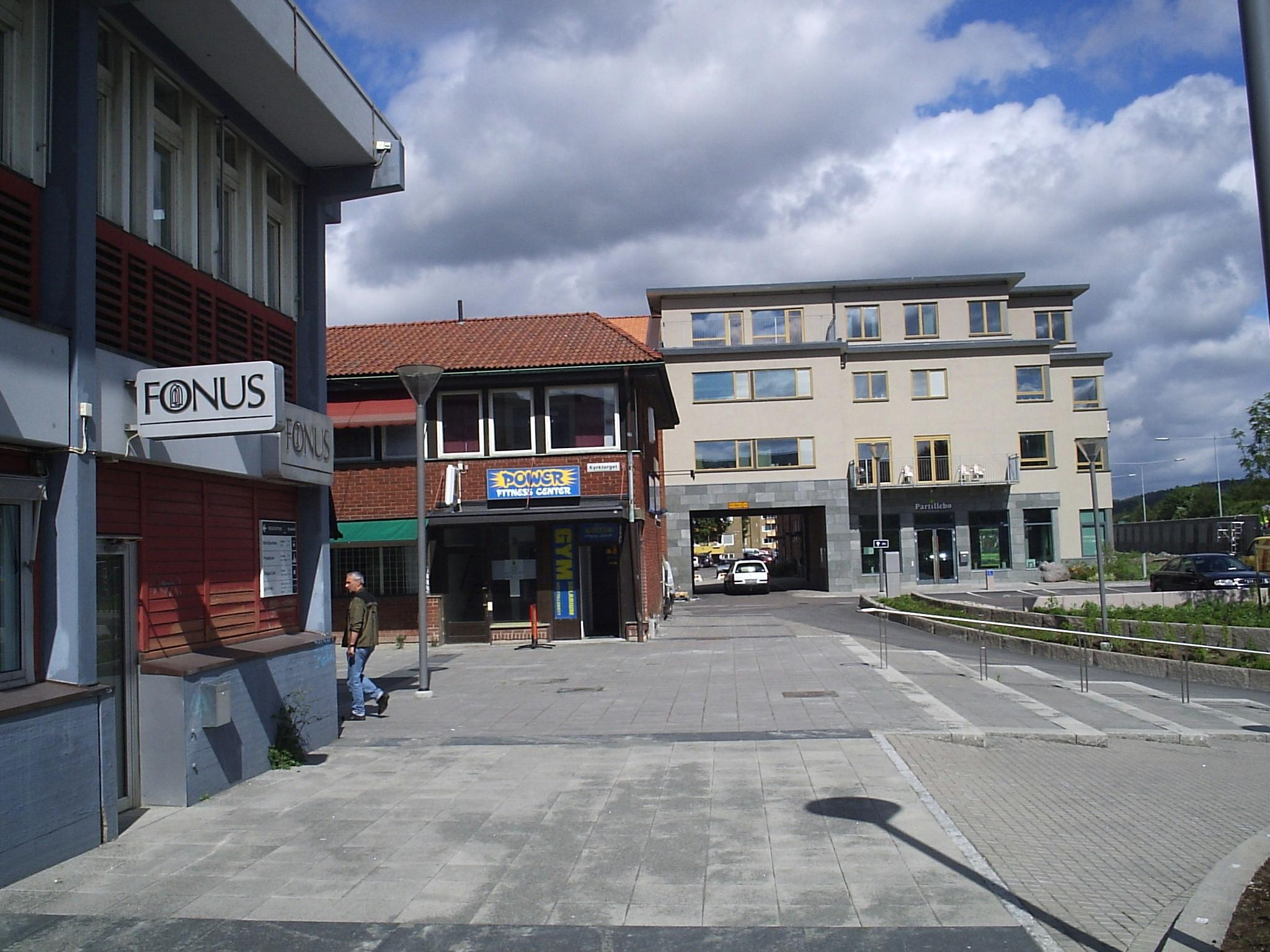

- Coat of arms

- Coordinates: 57°43′50″N 12°06′25″E
- Country: Sweden
- County: Västra Götaland County
- Seat: Partille

Area
  - Total: 58.98 km^{2} (22.77 sq mi)
  - Land: 56.83 km^{2} (21.94 sq mi)
  - Water: 2.15 km^{2} (0.83 sq mi)
- Area as of 1 January 2014.

Population (March 31, 2018)
  - Total: 37,931
  - Density: 667.4/km^{2} (1,729/sq mi)
- Time zone: UTC+1 (CET)
  - Summer (DST): UTC+2 (CEST)
- ISO 3166 code: SE
- Province: Västergötland
- Municipal code: 1402
- Website: www.partille.se

Partille Municipality (Swedish: Partille kommun) is a municipality in Västra Götaland County in western Sweden. Its seat is located in Partille, which constitutes a part of the contiguously built-up Gothenburg urban area.

The municipality is by area one of the smallest in Sweden with only 59.35 km^{2}.

The parish Partille was made a rural municipality, when the first local government acts came into force in 1863. Territorially it has not been affected by the nationwide municipal reforms carried out during the 20th century. It has retained its area, but it has developed into a suburb of Gothenburg.

== Geography ==
The municipality is subdivided into four geographical areas: Partille, Sävedalen, Jonsered and Öjersjö.

The area is a traditional Swedish woodland. Much of its industries has therefore a connection to the forest industry.

=== Localities ===
The western part of the municipality is part of the contiguous Gothenburg urban area. This then leads into Partille Centrum, which is the seat and the central part of the municipality.

Other localities are:

- Jonsered
- Kåhög
- Öjersjö
- Furulund, Partille

== Demographics ==
This is a demographic table based on Partille Municipality's electoral districts in the 2022 Swedish general election sourced from SVT's election platform, in turn taken from SCB official statistics.

In total there were 39,420 residents, including 28,286 Swedish citizens of voting age. 48.1% voted for the left coalition and 50.7% for the right coalition. Indicators are in percentage points except population totals and income.

Location	Residents	Citizen adults	Left vote	Right vote	Employed	Swedish parents	Foreign heritage	Income SEK	Degree
Location			%	%					
Bethala-Sotenäs N	2,161	1,542	42.1	57.6	84	79	21	32,803	60
Björndammens Torg	1,905	1,347	49.8	48.8	74	62	38	24,826	33
Brattåskärr N-Sotenäs S	2,060	1,542	43.2	56.1	88	85	15	36,428	75
Brattåskärr S-Fröjasten	2,241	1,611	48.1	50.9	87	84	16	34,022	72
Furulund	1,726	1,331	43.7	55.7	87	78	22	32,012	53
Hålsjö-Öjersjö S	1,904	1,178	41.4	58.0	93	88	12	42,586	73
Jonsered-Uddared	1,726	1,272	59.5	39.7	81	81	19	28,163	55
Kullegården N-Finngösa	1,700	1,184	45.3	53.8	75	71	29	28,164	56
Kullegården S-Puketorp	2,111	1,514	48.5	50.8	87	89	11	36,264	68
Kåsjö-Öjersjö N	1,396	1,062	40.0	59.7	87	88	12	38,750	68
Lexbydal-Kåhög	1,759	1,240	50.1	48.7	85	78	22	32,766	59
Mellby-Paradiset	1,903	1,336	49.6	49.3	82	71	29	30,005	52
Nedre Björndammen	1,673	1,183	49.3	49.0	81	66	34	29,948	48
Oluf Nilssons väg	2,162	1,294	56.8	40.0	70	38	62	22,403	37
Oxled-Soldatheden	1,931	1,417	48.4	50.0	79	72	28	25,574	47
Partille C	1,222	917	53.6	44.5	78	54	46	25,342	40
Skulltorp-Kåbäcken	1,783	1,301	48.8	50.1	83	60	40	28,968	45
Timmerslätt	1,549	1,138	50.4	48.6	85	79	21	27,354	47
Vallhamra C-Ljungkullen	1,892	1,424	49.9	48.3	80	69	31	26,488	42
Öjersjö Ö	1,834	1,282	41.7	57.5	87	78	22	33,087	57
Ö Centrum-Brodalen	1,453	1,088	52.8	46.2	82	62	38	28,311	47
Övre Björndammen	1,329	1,083	52.4	45.4	77	66	34	24,740	44
Source: SVT

== History ==
The area has been inhabited for more than a thousand years. Fifteen ancient monuments from that time remain.

Partille is located in a valley, between some mountains in a rocky terrain. Its name is believed to be derived from something similar to "Part haella" meaning "split rock". Another possible meaning could be "Port haella", the door in the mountain. The small river Säveån flows through the valley and intersects Partille. The name Säveån stems from the words säve, as in sävligt (leisurely, slow) and ån (the stream/creek), as it is a very slowly flowing little river. The river has been of great importance for Partille throughout its history. The fertile soil around it was used for agriculture and during the medieval ages a lot of farms were located there.

The oldest existing building in Partille is Partille Kyrka (Partille Church) which was built in the 13th century. The church, being placed in the current centre of Partille, indicates that the present centre has been the natural rendezvous and centre of the municipality ever since it was built. Being a Swedish, very old-fashioned, Partille Kyrka has no bell tower, as a complement a separate belfry was built in 1652.

It is also an excellent place for fishing. Records from the 16th century show that government officials fished here at the time. As is still the case today, the most popular fish were salmon and trout.

Apart from agriculture and forestry transportations has been a very important field of business. The manager of the East India Company, David af Sanderberg, built Partille Herrgård (manor) between 1770 and 1780, today this manor serves a landmark for everyone who passes through the municipality. Later, during the 19th century, Sweden's first industrial society developed in Jonsered. The Scotsmen William Gibson and Alexander Keiller opened a factory for production of sail- and tent cloth. Sweden's first terrace-houses in classical English style was also built there. Nowadays Jonsered is still classified as a national interest due to its well preserved cultural environment.

== Economy ==
Industries which are based in Partille include: Soft Touch AB (Personal Protective Equipment), Triumfglass (ice cream), Swisslog, Ragn Sells.

Apart from Partille Manor, the main key feature of Partille is the shopping mall Allum. In 1999 Partille municipality initiated a cooperation with the construction company Sten & Ström Sverige. The aim of this co-operation was to unify the two parts of the municipality, each on the north/south of the highway E20. The construction of Allum began on 3 February 2004 and was completed on 9 April 2006. The name "Allum" comes from the old Swedish word for "alla" (everyone), the name thus mean "åt alla" (for everyone) or "till alla" (to everyone). The mall has created roughly 650 new jobs and includes around 100 stores.

== Sports ==
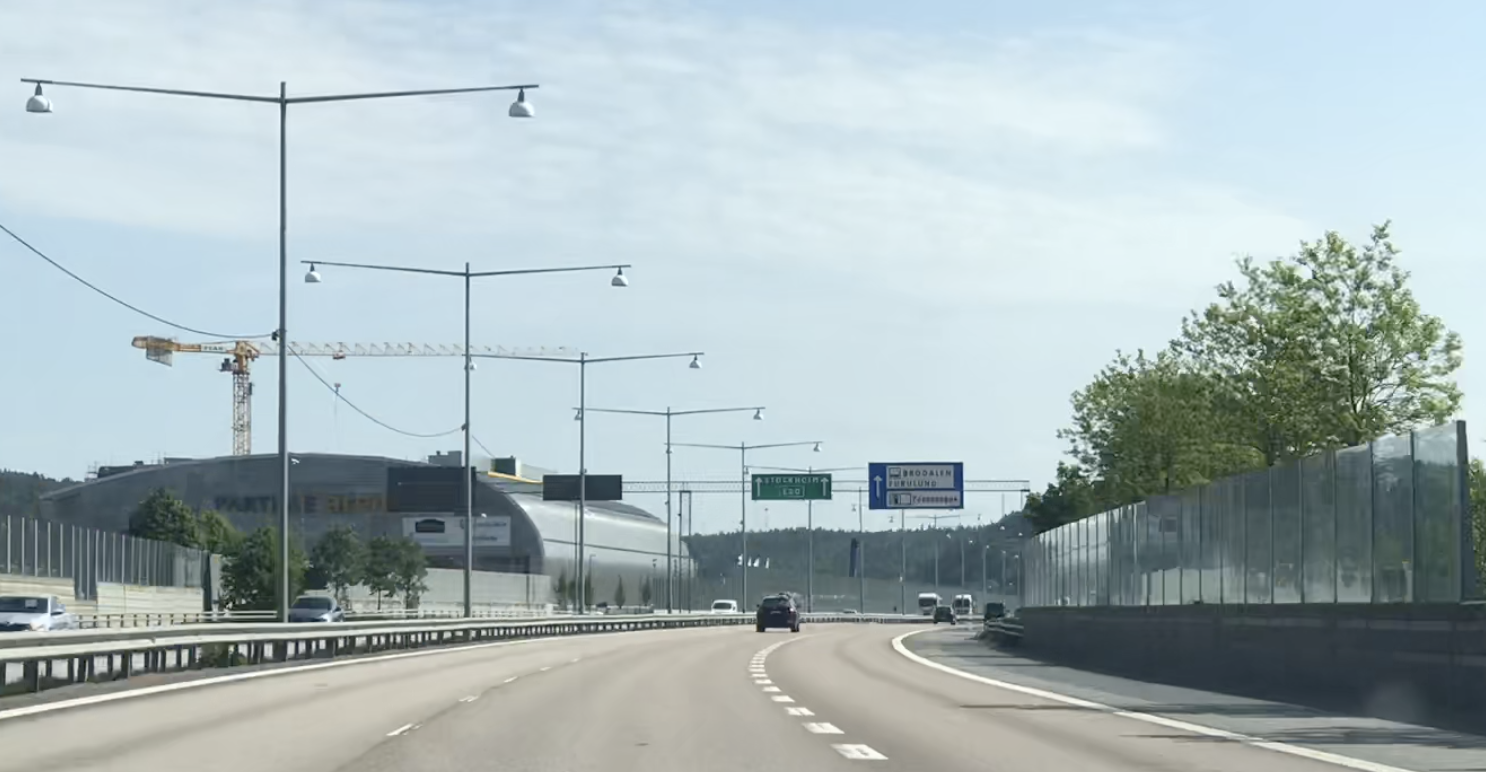
Partille Arena

The following sports clubs are located in Partille:

- Partille IF
- IK Sävehof
- SAIK
- Jonsereds IF
- Partille Badminton

=== Partille Cup ===
Partille Cup, arranged by IK Sävehof, is the world's largest handball tournament for youths. It was first launched in Partille in 1963, and was then played at Vallhamra Idrottsplats (Vallhamra sports field). As the tournament grew in size it was gradually moved to Gothenburg, where it is now played. The tournament is arranged annually during the first week of July, and in 2010 the tournament featured 1035 teams from 46 countries.

== Education ==
Partille has several elementary schools including:

- Casa Montessori
- Björndammens Skola
- Furulunds Skola
- Lexby Skola
- Jonsereds Skola
- Lillegårdsskolan
- Oxeledsskolan
- Skulltorps Skola
- Ugglums Skola
- Vallhamra Skola
- Öjersjö Brunn
- Öjersjö Storegård
- Stadsparksskolan

The municipality then offers a higher education at Porthälla Gymnasium (high school).

== Twin cities ==
- Chrudim—Czech Republic
