= Husqvarna Group =

Swedish outdoor power products manufacturer

Husqvarna AB
- Type: Public
- Traded as: Nasdaq Stockholm: HUSQ B
- Industry: Consumer Durables
- Founded: 1689; 337 years ago
- Headquarters: Stockholm and Huskvarna, Sweden
- Key people: Torbjörn Lööf (chairman); Glen Instone (CEO)
- Products: Outdoor power products including robotic lawn mowers, chainsaws, trimmers, ride-on lawn-mowers, consumer watering products, and equipment and diamond tools for the construction and stone industries
- Revenue: SEK 46,6 billion, 2025
- Operating income: SEK 2,9 billion, 2025
- Owners: Investor AB (16.8%); Robert Bosch (12.0%); Lundbergföretagen (7.7%)
- Number of employees: 11,900 (2025)
- Website: husqvarnagroup.com

The Husqvarna Group (Swedish pronunciation: [ˈhʉ̂ːsˌkvɑːɳa ˈɡruːp]) is a Swedish manufacturer of outdoor power products including robotic lawn mowers, chainsaws, trimmers, brushcutters, cultivators, and garden tractors. Founded as a firearms manufacturer in 1689, it is one of the oldest continuously running companies in the world. Headquartered in Stockholm, Sweden, the group also produces cutting equipment and diamond tools for the construction and stone industries. In 2007, it acquired Gardena GmbH, a German manufacturer of gardening tools and consumer watering products.

Their motorcycle division was spun off in 1987, and is now owned by Bajaj Group.

Their sewing machine division was sold off in 1997 and is now owned by SVP Worldwide.

Husqvarna Group sponsors the Swedish ice hockey club HV71, whose home arena, Husqvarna Garden, pays homage to its sponsor.

== History ==
=== 1689–1899 ===
Beginning in 1689, the drilling work at the waterfalls in Husqvarna, southern Sweden, was the first large plant in Sweden. The state-owned rifle factory had some 1,000 employees at the beginning of the 18th century. By 1872 demand for rifles had declined. It turned out that the machinery for production of rifles was well-suited for converting the factory to produce sewing machines. Two years later, Husqvarna started a foundry to produce parts for sewing machines, a large part being the base frames. Soon the product assortment was broadened to include such kitchen equipment such as cast iron items and later stoves and ovens.

=== 20th century ===
In 1896, bicycle production began at the Husqvarna factory. Several patents were registered. The last bicycle was produced in 1962. In 1903, the first Husqvarna motorcycle, which could reach the impressive speed of 4–5 km/hour, was produced. Starting in the 1930s, Husqvarna's lightweight engines helped make track racing and motocross bikes successful. Husqvarna's first titles in Motocross World Championship came in 1959 and 1960. The operation was divested in 1987 and since 2025 is part of Bajaj Auto.

When Husqvarna acquired Norrahammars Bruk in 1918, their product range expanded to heating boilers and lawn mowers. The first test of a lawn mower powered by an engine was done in 1947. As demand for bicycles, mopeds and motorcycles declined, forestry became increasingly important to the company. Their expertise in engines was utilized in new areas and their first chainsaw was produced in 1959. The company was spun off from Husqvarna Vapenfabriks Aktiebolag in 1959. Shotguns were produced for 300 years, the last in 1989.

A rebuilt saw in 1968 was the starting point of what today is Husqvarna Construction. In 1978, Electrolux acquired Husqvarna. The motorcycle division was sold to Cagiva in 1976. The Husqvarna-branded sewing machines were sold to the VSM Group in 1997 and later became part of SVP Worldwide. In 1999 Husqvarna acquired Nebraska-based lawn mower manufacturer Yazoo/Kees.

=== 21st century ===
In 2006, Husqvarna was spun off by Electrolux. In 2007, The acquisition of the German gardening tool manufacturer Gardena made the Husqvarna Group the European leader in consumer watering products. The purchase of Zenoah brought a strong brand and opened geographical expansion in Japan. The acquisition of Jenn Feng and the construction of a new plant for chainsaws and other handheld products gave expanded presence in Asia in 2008. In 2009 Husqvarna launched its first remote-controlled demolition robot.

The decision was made to invest in a new production facility for chainsaw chains in Husqvarna in 2013. In 2017 Acquired HTC Sweden AB, the leading manufacturer of floor grinding machines and related diamond tooling, along with its France, Germany, UK and USA subsidiaries. Electro-Bicycles offered by Pexco GmbH, Schweinfurt, Germany, founded by the Puello family (former executive of Haibike) and Stefan Pierer, CEO of KTM Industries AG (KTM motorcycles). Include motors by Shimano. Purchased by Husqvarna. In 2019, Husqvarna group celebrated 330 years of innovation, as well as 60 years as a chainsaw manufacturer.

Husqvarna acquired Blastrac, manufacturer of floor grinding machines and related diamond tooling, along with its European subsidiaries in 2020. In 2022, Husqvarna CEORA, an autonomous robotic lawn mower that caters to lawns up to 75,000 square meters and guided via satellite-based solution without the need for physical wires. Husqvarna acquired smart irrigation management company ETWater from Rivulis for an undisclosed amount in 2024.

== Brands ==
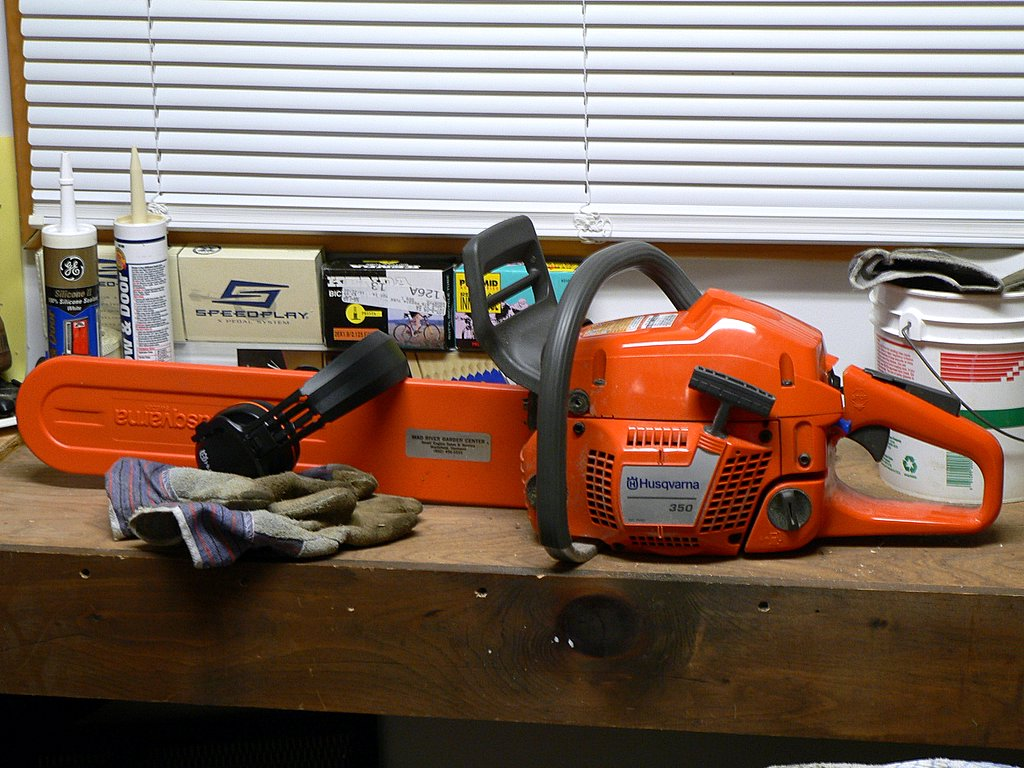
A Husqvarna 350 chainsaw

Husqvarna owns several brands:

- Husqvarna
- Gardena
- McCulloch
- Poulan
- PoulanPro
- Weed Eater
- Flymo
- Jonsered
- Klippo
- Diamant Boart
- RedMax
- HTC
- Blastrac
- Total Diamond Products

Over the years, Husqvarna has manufactured products for retailers, including Sears. Most of these products have a model number that begins with "917".

== See also ==
- Husqvarna Vapenfabriks Aktiebolag
- Husqvarna Motorcycles
