= Hozelock =

Plastic manufacturing company

Hozelock Ltd is a garden equipment company based in Sutton Coldfield, England set up by Sydney Codling in 1959 to sell hoses and related equipment including the first plastic quick-connector hose connector. As well as manufacturing the equipment in the Haddenham factory they also designed many of their own products.

Sydney's son, David Codling, took over as Chief Executive circa 1990, after the business was bought in 1990 by CVC Capital Partners, then named Citicorp Venture Capital, in a £24m buy-out from Ropner, the conglomerate.

CVC bought the business with rival private equity groups Cinven, Legal & General Ventures and Prudential's venture capital division. Hozelock was floated in 1993, but CVC took the company private again in 1999 for £85m after a succession of wet summers and stock market turmoil halved the company's share price.

In 2009 the brand agency Haines McGregor was engaged to help develop the European positioning for the brand. Following two previously unsuccessful attempts to sell the business in 2007-9 for £100m, the new positioning and identity work helped support the successful sale to strategic buyer Exel Industries in October 2012 for £200m.

David Codling retired as Executive Chairman in 2009. Steve Hall then became Group CEO. In August 2022, Simon Davies was appointed Chief Executive Officer, succeeding Marc Ballu.

== History ==
1959 – Founded by Sydney Codling to market the first plastic quick-connect hose connector, initially based at Haddenham airfield in Buckinghamshire.

1990 – The firm was acquired by CVC Capital Partners and associated investors via a £24 million management buyout.

1993 – Floated on the London Stock Exchange, but was later taken private again in 1999 in an £85 million deal following market volatility and poor sales years.

2009 – David Codling, Sydney’s son and long-serving Executive Chairman, retired after over 30 years in leadership. Companies House records confirm he stepped down as director on 31 March 2009.

2009 – Following Codling’s retirement, Steve Hall was appointed Group CEO, as indicated by Companies House filings dated 9 December 2009.

2012 – After two failed sale attempts, Hozelock was acquired by Exel Industries for approximately £200 million.

2022 – Simon Davies, formerly Group Sales & Marketing Director, was appointed CEO of Hozelock in August 2022, succeeding Marc Ballu, who transitioned to lead Exel’s Garden Retail division.

2025 – Simon Davies remains the current CEO (as of June 2025), overseeing around 300 permanent employees at Hozelock’s Sutton Coldfield headquarters.

== Corporate Ownership ==
Hozelock is wholly owned by Exel Industries, a publicly traded French engineering group active in sectors such as agricultural and industrial spraying, nautical equipment, technical hoses, and garden solutions. The company remains headquartered in Sutton Coldfield near Birmingham.

== Products ==
Hozelock’s core products include hose systems (hoses, connectors, reels), spray guns, sprinklers, pond care devices, and accessories. Manufacturing is primarily UK‑based (over 75%), with supplemental production in France, Malaysia, Taiwan, and China. Independent reviews, including a BBC Gardener’s World Magazine "Best Buy" award for the Fast Reel hose system, have praised its ease of use and durability.
