= George C. Marshall =

American politician and United States Army general (1880–1959)

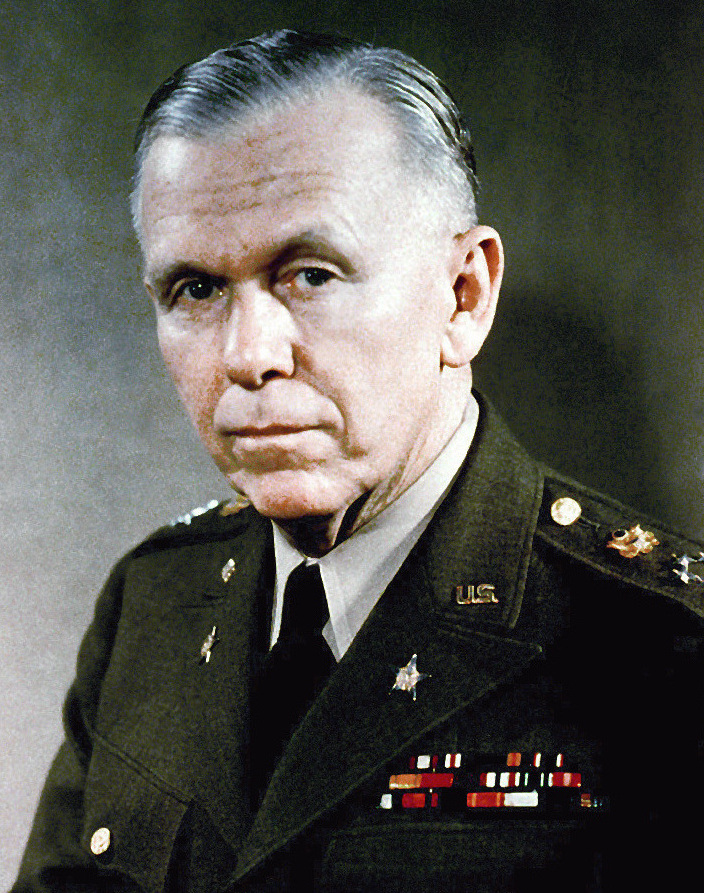
- Official portrait, 1946

3rd United States Secretary of Defense
- In office 21 September 1950 – 12 September 1951
- President: Harry S. Truman
- Deputy: Stephen Early; Robert A. Lovett
- Preceded by: Louis A. Johnson
- Succeeded by: Robert A. Lovett

50th United States Secretary of State
- In office 21 January 1947 – 20 January 1949
- President: Harry S. Truman
- Deputy: Dean Acheson; Robert A. Lovett
- Preceded by: James F. Byrnes
- Succeeded by: Dean Acheson

15th Chief of Staff of the United States Army
- In office 1 September 1939 – 18 November 1945
- President: Franklin D. Roosevelt; Harry S. Truman
- Deputy: Lorenzo D. Gasser; William Bryden
- Preceded by: Malin Craig
- Succeeded by: Dwight D. Eisenhower
Other offices
10th President of the American Red Cross
In office 1 October 1949 – 1 December 1950
President	Harry S. Truman
Preceded by	Basil O'Connor
Succeeded by	E. Roland Harriman
2nd Chairman of the American Battle Monuments Commission
In office 20 January 1949 – 16 October 1959
Preceded by	John J. Pershing
Succeeded by	Jacob L. Devers
United States Special Envoy to China
In office 20 December 1945 – 6 January 1947
President	Harry S. Truman
Preceded by	Position established
Succeeded by	Position abolished

Personal details
- Born: George Catlett Marshall Jr. 31 December 1880 Uniontown, Pennsylvania, U.S.
- Died: 16 October 1959 (aged 78) Washington, D.C., U.S.
- Resting place: Arlington National Cemetery
- Spouses: Lily Carter Coles (m. 1902; died 1927) Katherine Boyce Tupper Brown (m. 1930)
- Relations: Richard J. Marshall (distant cousin); John Marshall (distant cousin)
- Education: Virginia Military Institute
- Civilian awards: Nobel Peace Prize; Congressional Gold Medal; Charlemagne Prize

Military service
- Branch/service: United States Army
- Years of service: 1902–1959 (Note: U.S. officers holding five-star rank never retire; they draw full active duty pay for life.)
- Rank: General of the Army
- Commands: Chief of Staff of the United States Army; Deputy Chief of Staff of the United States Army; 5th Brigade, 3rd Infantry Division; Fort Moultrie and District I, Civilian Conservation Corps; Fort Screven and District F, Civilian Conservation Corps; 8th Infantry Regiment
- Battles/wars: Philippine–American War; Post-war insurgency; World War I; Western Front; Meuse-Argonne Offensive; World War II; Chinese Civil War; Operation Beleaguer; Korean War
- Military awards: Army Distinguished Service Medal (2); Silver Star; Croix de Guerre
- Football career

VMI Keydets
- Position: Left Tackle

Career information
- College: VMI (1900)

Awards and highlights
- All-Southern (1900)
- Marshall's voice George C. Marshall's speech at Harvard University introducing the Marshall Plan, 5 June 1947

Pennsylvania Historical Marker
- Official name: George C. Marshall
- Type: Roadside
- Designated: 17 January 1981

General of the Army George Catlett Marshall Jr. (31 December 1880 – 16 October 1959) was an American military officer and diplomat. He rose through the United States Army to become Chief of Staff of the U.S. Army under presidents Franklin D. Roosevelt and Harry S. Truman, then served as Secretary of State and Secretary of Defense under Truman. Winston Churchill lauded Marshall as the "organizer of victory" for his leadership of the Allied victory in World War II. During the subsequent year, he unsuccessfully tried to prevent the continuation of the Chinese Civil War. As Secretary of State, Marshall advocated for a U.S. economic and political commitment to post-war European recovery, including the Marshall Plan that bore his name. In recognition of this work, he was awarded the Nobel Peace Prize in 1953, the only Army general ever to receive the honor.

Born in Uniontown, Pennsylvania, Marshall graduated from the Virginia Military Institute (VMI) in 1901. He received his commission as a second lieutenant of Infantry in February 1902 and immediately went to the Philippines. He served in the United States and overseas in positions of increasing rank, including platoon leader and company commander in the Philippines during the Philippine–American War. He was the top-ranked of the five Honor Graduates of his Infantry-Cavalry School Course in 1907 and graduated first in his 1908 Army Staff College class. In 1916 Marshall was assigned as aide-de-camp to J. Franklin Bell, the commander of the Western Department. After the nation entered the First World War in 1917, Marshall served with Bell, who commanded the Department of the East. He was assigned to the staff of the 1st Division; he assisted with the organization's mobilization and training in the United States, as well as planning of its combat operations in France. Subsequently assigned to the staff of the American Expeditionary Forces headquarters, he was a key planner of American operations, including the Meuse-Argonne Offensive.

Following his service in World War I, Marshall became an aide-de-camp to Army chief of staff John J. Pershing. Marshall later served on the Army staff, was the executive officer of the 15th Infantry Regiment in China and was an instructor at the Army War College. In 1927, he became assistant commandant of the Army's Infantry School, where he modernized command and staff processes, which proved to be of major benefit during World War II. In 1932 and 1933, he commanded the 8th Infantry Regiment and Fort Screven, Georgia. Marshall commanded 5th Brigade, 3rd Infantry Division and Vancouver Barracks from 1936 to 1938; he received promotion to brigadier general. During this command, Marshall was also responsible for 35 Civilian Conservation Corps (CCC) camps in Oregon and Southern Washington. In July 1938, Marshall was assigned to the War Plans Division on the War Department staff; he later became the Army's deputy chief of staff. When Chief of Staff Malin Craig retired in 1939, Marshall assumed the role of Chief of Staff in an acting capacity before his appointment to the position, which he held until the war's end in 1945.

As the U.S. Army's chief of staff, Marshall worked closely with Secretary of War Henry L. Stimson to organize the largest military expansion in U.S. history, and was ultimately promoted to five-star rank as General of the Army. Marshall coordinated Allied operations in Europe and the Pacific until the end of the war. In addition to accolades from Winston Churchill and other Allied leaders, Time magazine named Marshall its Man of the Year for 1943 and 1947. Marshall retired from active service in 1945, but remained on active duty, as required for holders of five-star rank. From 15 December 1945 to January 1947, Marshall served as a special envoy to China in an unsuccessful effort to negotiate a coalition government between the Nationalists of Chiang Kai-shek and the Communists of Mao Zedong.

As Secretary of State from 1947 to 1949, Marshall advocated rebuilding Europe, a program that became known as the Marshall Plan, and which led to his being awarded the 1953 Nobel Peace Prize. After resigning as Secretary of State, Marshall served as chairman of the American Battle Monuments Commission and president of the American National Red Cross. As Secretary of Defense after the start of the Korean War, Marshall worked to restore the military's confidence and morale after the end of its post-World War II demobilization and then its initial buildup for combat in Korea and operations during the Cold War. Resigning as Defense Secretary, Marshall retired to his home in Virginia. He died in 1959 and was buried with honors at Arlington National Cemetery.

== Early life and education ==
George Catlett Marshall Jr. was born in Uniontown, Pennsylvania, the youngest of three children born to George Catlett Marshall and Laura Emily (née Bradford) Marshall. Both sides of his family were long from Kentucky, but cherished their Virginia roots. (Note: In an interview late in his life, when asked whether he regarded himself a Virginian, he answered: 'My family are Kentucky. I myself was the only member of the family born up north... I married two Virginians, very ardent Virginians, and I went to school in a very ardent, historical Virginia section school. I might say also that I pay taxes in Virginia" (Unger, Unger & Hirshson 2014, p. 5n)) He was also a first cousin, three times removed, of former chief justice John Marshall. He was also a distant cousin of Richard J. Marshall. Marshall's father was active in the coal and coke business. Later, when asked about his political allegiances, Marshall often joked that his father had been a Democrat and his mother a Republican, whereas he was an Episcopalian.

Marshall was educated at Miss Alcinda Thompson's private school in Uniontown and spent a year at Uniontown's Central School. Having decided early in life that he desired a career in the military, but unlikely to obtain an appointment to the United States Military Academy because of his average grades, he looked to the Virginia Military Institute (VMI) for a formal education. Marshall's brother Stuart, a VMI alumnus, believed George would not succeed and argued that their mother should not let George attend out of concern that he would "disgrace the family name." Determined to "wipe his brother's face," Marshall enrolled at the age of sixteen in September 1897. To pay for his tuition and expenses, Marshall's mother sold parcels of land she owned in Uniontown and Augusta, Kentucky.

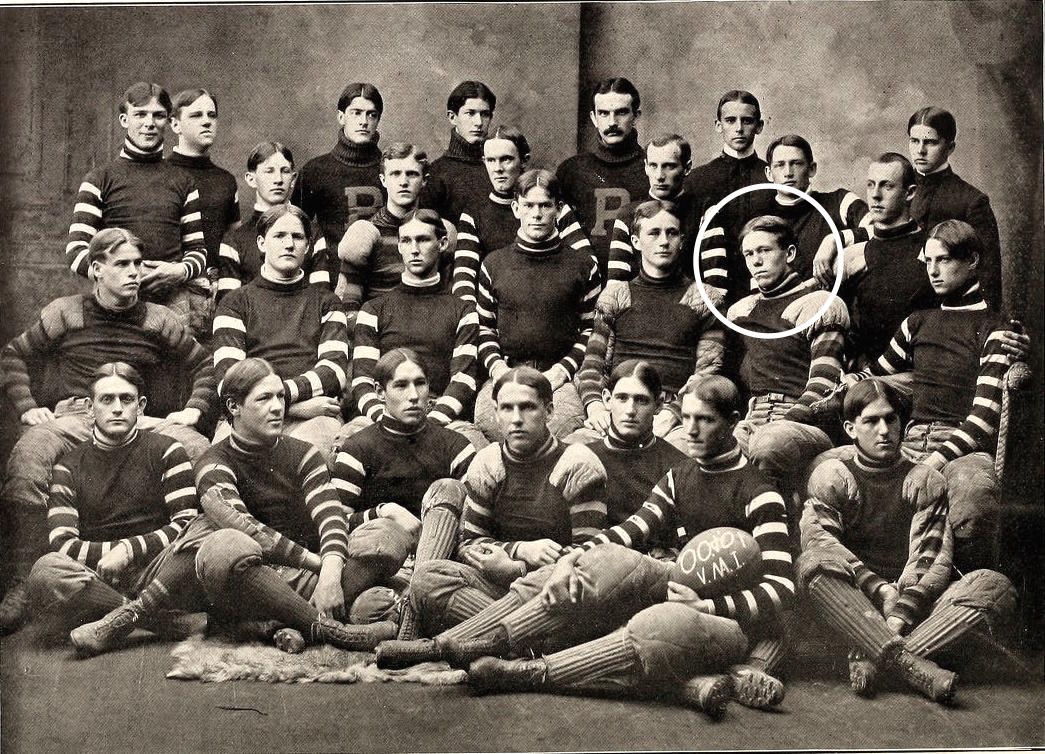
1900 VMI Keydets football team. Marshall circled

At the start of his college career, Marshall was subjected to a hazing incident in which upperclassmen positioned an unsheathed bayonet with the point up and directed him to squat over it. After twenty minutes, Marshall fainted and fell. When he awoke, he had a deep laceration to one of his buttocks. While being treated for his injury, Marshall refused to inform on his classmates. Impressed with his bravery, the hazers never bothered him again.

During his years at VMI, Marshall always ranked first in military discipline and about midway academically. He attained the rank of first captain, the highest a cadet could achieve, and graduated 15th of 34 in the Class of 1901. Marshall received a diploma, not a degree. At the time of his graduation, the top five or six VMI graduates received bachelor's degrees. The rest received diplomas attesting to their status as graduates. He played tackle on the football team and in 1900 he was selected for All-Southern honors.

== Early infantry career and the Philippines ==
Following his graduation from VMI, Marshall served as Commandant of Students at the Danville Military Institute in Danville, Virginia. He took a competitive examination for a commission in the United States Army, which had greatly expanded to deal with the Spanish–American War and Philippine–American War. Marshall passed and used endorsements his father obtained from both of Pennsylvania's U.S. senators to bolster his application. VMI Superintendent Scott Shipp also supported Marshall's application, and in a letter to President William McKinley compared him favorably to other VMI graduates serving in the Army, saying Marshall was "Fully the equal of the best." He was commissioned a second lieutenant of Infantry in February 1902. In a matter of days he married, resigned the Danville job, and shipped out to serve with the 30th Infantry Regiment in the Philippines.

Prior to World War I, Marshall received various postings in the United States and the Philippines, including serving as an infantry platoon leader and company commander during the Philippine–American War and other guerrilla uprisings. He was schooled in modern warfare, including tours from 1906 to 1910 as both a student and an instructor. He was ranked first of five Honor Graduates of his Infantry-Cavalry School Course (now the United States Army Command and General Staff College) in 1907 and graduated first in his 1908 Army Staff College (now the United States Army War College) class. After graduating in 1908, Marshall was assigned as an instructor at the Fort Leavenworth Infantry-Cavalry School. While on the faculty, he met Hunter Liggett, who was then commanding a battalion at Fort Leavenworth. Though Marshall was subordinate to Liggett, Liggett volunteered to study the curriculum under Marshall's tutelage; Marshall made the lessons and practical exercises available to Liggett, critiqued Liggett's answers, then shared with him the faculty's schoolhouse solutions.

Beginning in 1913, Marshall served as aide-de-camp to Major General J. Franklin Bell, the commander of the Department of the Philippines. He continued in this role during Bell's command of the army's Western Department at the Presidio of San Francisco. In the summer and fall of 1916, Marshall was responsible for organizing several Western Department Citizens' Military Training Camps. After the American entry into World War I in April 1917, Marshall relocated with Bell to Governors Island, New York, when Bell was reassigned as commander of the Department of the East. Shortly afterwards, Marshall was assigned to help oversee the mobilization of the 1st Division for service in France.

== World War I ==
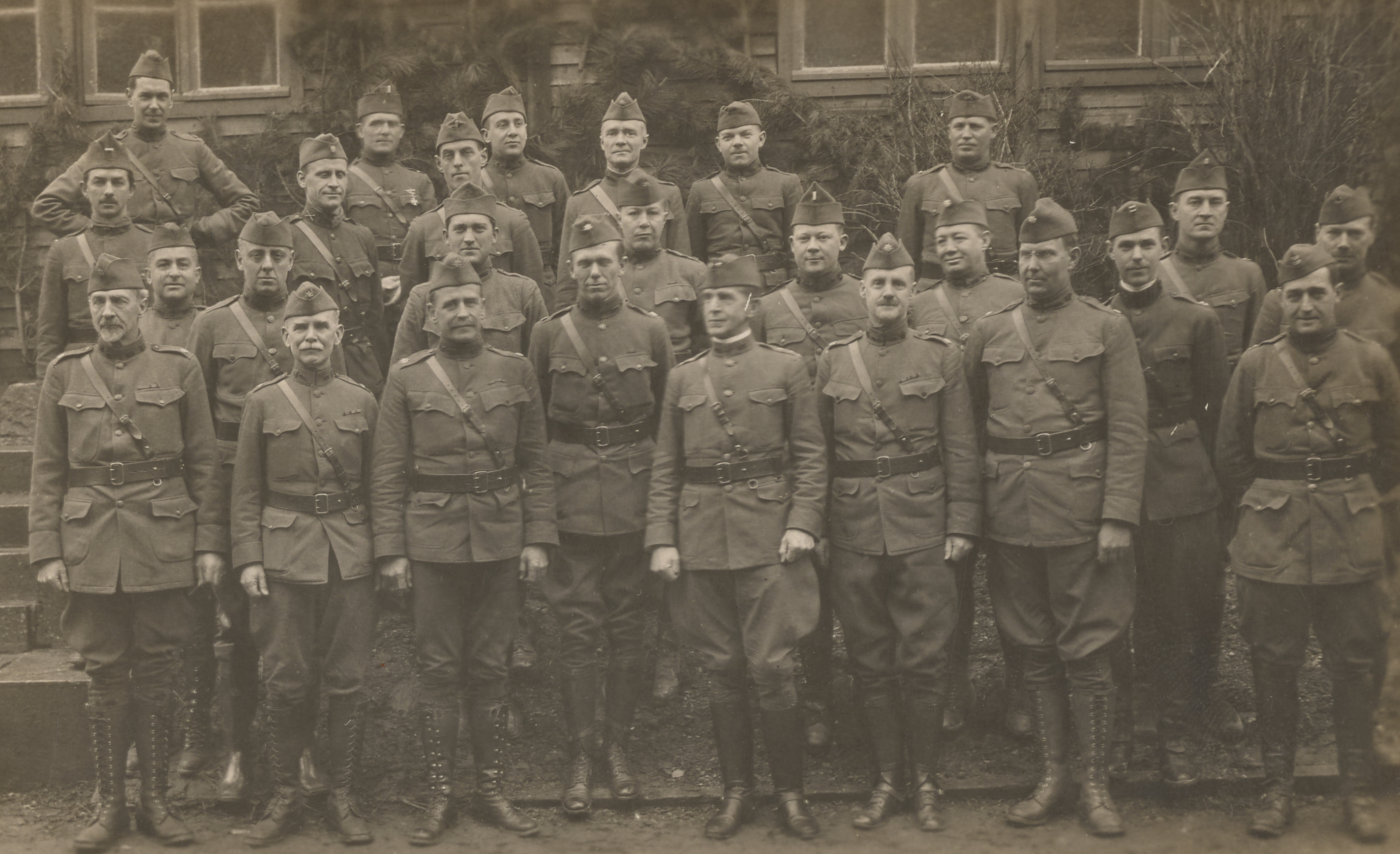
Major General Robert Lee Bullard (center, facing towards his right, photo's left), the newly appointed commander of the 1st Division, and members of his divisional staff at Gondrecourt, France, 17 January 1918. To Bullard's right is Lieutenant Colonel George C. Marshall, the 1st Division's assistant chief of staff for operations.

Shortly after the American entry into World War I in April 1917, Marshall had roles as a planner of both training and operations. In the summer, he was assigned as assistant chief of staff for operations on the staff of the newly created 1st Division, commanded by Major General William L. Sibert, a fifty-six-year-old engineer officer. After overseeing the division's mobilization and organization in Texas, he departed for France with the division staff in mid-1917. On the long ocean voyage, his roommate was the division's assistant chief of staff for training, Major Lesley J. McNair; the two formed a personal and professional bond that they maintained for the rest of their careers. Marshall was the first passenger from the first boat transporting American Expeditionary Forces (AEF) soldiers to set foot in Europe, and one of the first to enter the trenches of the Western Front.

After arriving in France, Marshall served with the 1st Division on the Saint-Mihiel, Picardy, and Cantigny fronts. Although the division was designated as a Regular Army formation, most of the officers and men serving within its ranks were almost completely lacking in combat experience. They were also deficient "in training, staff work, and logistical problems. More than half of its soldiers were new recruits. Only a few of its non-commissioned officers had been in the Army for two years or more, and nearly all of the lieutenants had been commissioned less than six months".

In late 1917, General John J. Pershing, the commander-in-chief (C-in-C) of the AEF, inspected the 1st Division. Unimpressed by what he observed, Pershing began to berate Sibert in front of Sibert's staff. Sibert took Pershing's criticism in silence, but when Pershing turned his attention to the division chief of staff, Marshall angrily interceded to inform Pershing of logistical and administrative difficulties of which Pershing was unaware. Marshall also informed Pershing that the AEF staff had not been very helpful in dealing with the problems. Sibert and his staff were concerned that Marshall's willingness to confront Pershing had probably cost him his career. Instead, Pershing began to seek out Marshall and ask for his advice whenever he visited the 1st Division, which, over the winter, "completed extensive training, much of it under French tutelage". By mid-April 1918 the division, now commanded by Major General Robert Lee Bullard, was deemed to have progressed enough in its training to have its own sector of the Western Front to hold.

Marshall won recognition and acclaim for his planning of the Battle of Cantigny, which took place from 28 to 31 May 1918; Marshall's success resulted in the first notable American victory of the war. As he conducted pre-attack planning, Marshall traveled alone under cover of darkness to personally view the terrain and mentally map it. Marshall ventured beyond the front lines and far into no-man's land, often under friendly artillery fire and routinely risking discovery and capture by Imperial German Army troops. On 26 May, he was injured while traveling to several subordinate units to conduct pre-attack coordination. As he departed the division headquarters area, his horse stumbled, fell, and rolled over; Marshall's left foot was caught in the stirrup, and he sustained a severe sprain and bruise. A physician bound Marshall's injured ankle and foot with adhesive tape so he could avoid medical evacuation and remain with the division to oversee the attack. In 1920, Marshall was awarded the Citation Star for his heroism during this battle. When the Silver Star medal was created in 1932, Citation Stars were converted to the new award. (Note: Marshall's Silver Star citation reads: "he was Assistant Chief of Staff for Operations at the First Division Headquarters from 8 June 1917, to 6 July 1918. By his superior professional attainments, his tactical skill, his sound judgment, and his courageous conduct in obtaining information through personal visits to the most exposed lines, he contributed in a determining manner to the training, morale, and operations of the Division in the Toul Sector, the Cantigny Sector, and the movement for the offensive at Soissons.")

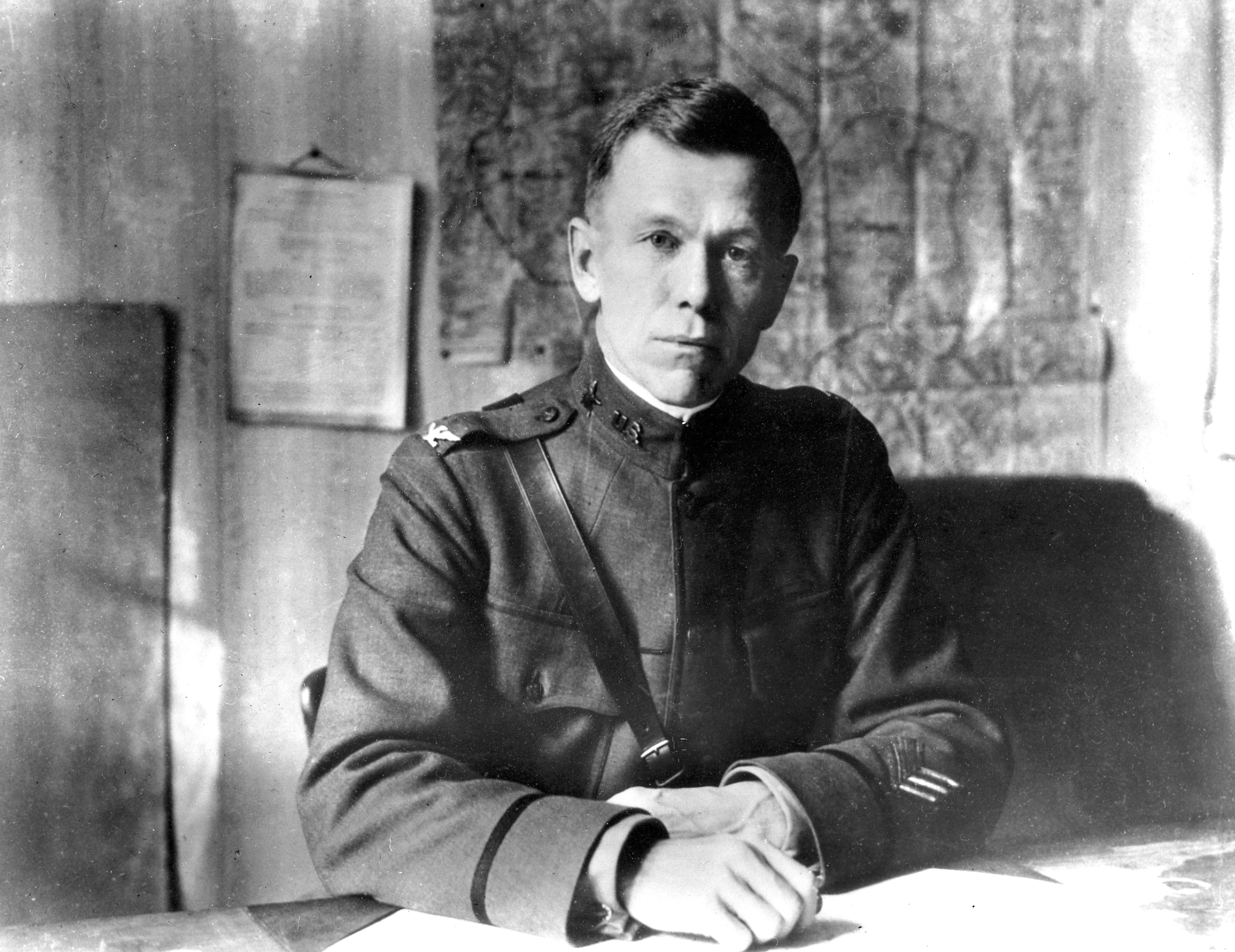
Colonel Marshall in France in 1919

In mid-1918, Pershing brought Marshall on to the AEF operations staff, G-3, where he worked closely with Pershing and was a key planner of American operations. He was instrumental in the planning and coordination of the Meuse–Argonne offensive, which contributed to the defeat of the German Empire on the Western Front in 1918. In August, he was assigned as assistant chief of operations (G-3) for First Army, which was commanded first by Pershing, then by Liggett. At the end of the war, Marshall held the permanent rank of captain and the temporary rank of colonel and was recommended for promotion to temporary brigadier general in October 1918, but the Armistice with Germany on 11 November 1918 occurred before the recommendation was acted on.

After the Armistice, Marshall served as chief of staff for the VIII Corps. For his services during the war he was awarded the Army Distinguished Service Medal, the citation for which reads:

The President of the United States of America, authorized by Act of Congress, 9 July 1918, takes pleasure in presenting the Army Distinguished Service Medal to Colonel (Infantry) George Catlett Marshall, Jr. (ASN: 0-1616), United States Army, for exceptionally meritorious and distinguished services to the Government of the United States, in a duty of great responsibility during World War I. Colonel Marshall has performed the duties of Assistant Chief of Staff, G-3, 1st Division, from 26 June 1917 to 12 July 1918. He served in the G-3 Section, General Headquarters, American Expeditionary Forces, from 13 July 1918 to 19 August 1918, in G-3 section, 1st Army, from 20 August 1918 to 16 October 1918; as Assistant Chief of Staff, G-3, of the 1st Army from 17 October to 19 November 1918; and as Chief of Staff of the 8th Army Corps from 20 November 1918 to 15 January 1918, during which period the 1st Division served in the Toul sector and at the Cantigny attack and the 1st Army operations in the St. Mihiel and Meuse-Argonne offensives. By untiring, painstaking, and energetic efforts he succeeded in all these undertakings. His efforts had a marked influence on the successes achieved by the units with which he served.

== Between the wars ==
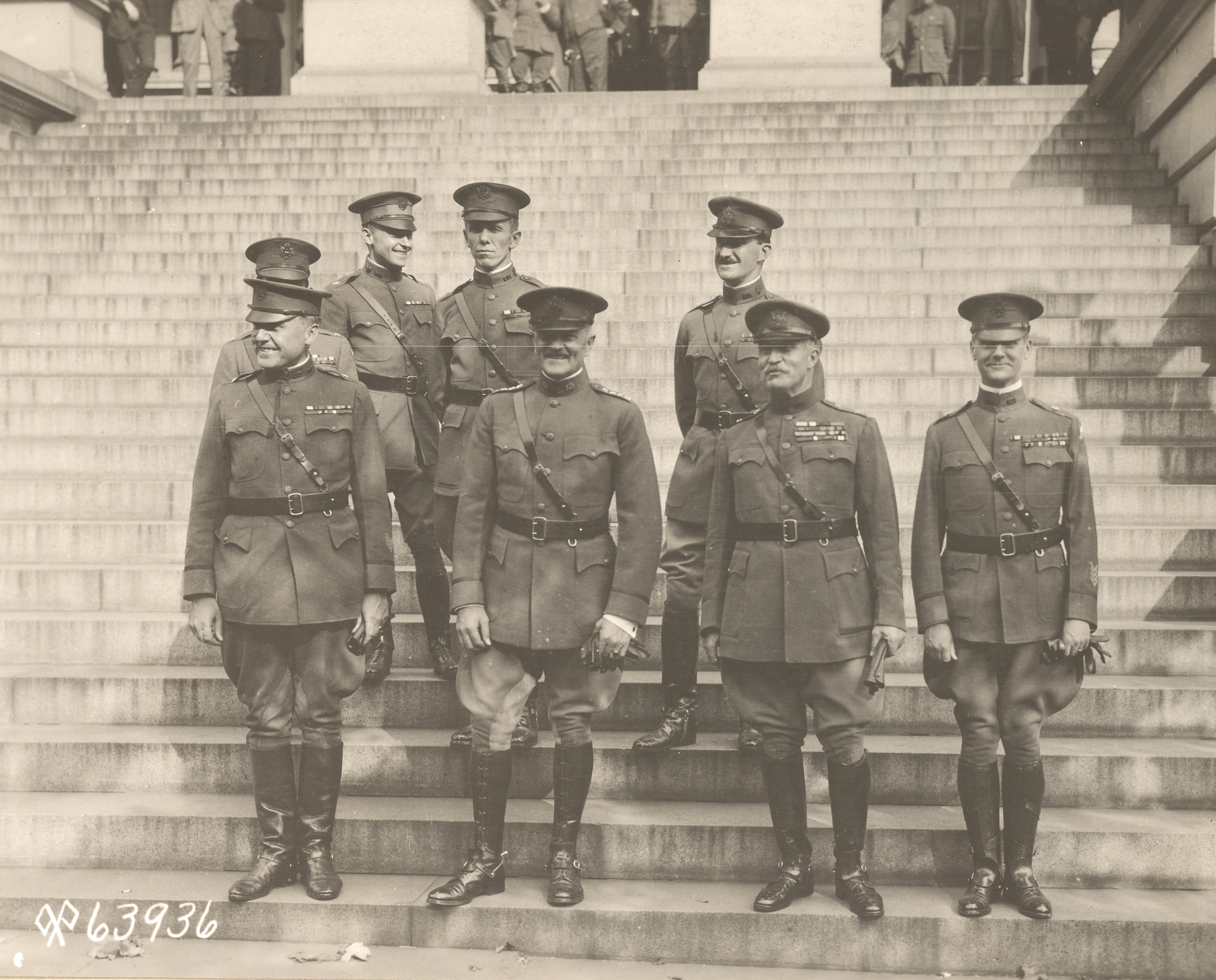
General of the Armies John J. Pershing and members of his staff standing outside the State, War, and Navy Building in Washington, D.C., 23 September 1919. Pershing is second from left in front row. Marshall is behind Pershing.

After the war, Marshall reverted to his permanent rank of captain. In 1919, he became an aide-de-camp to General Pershing. Between 1920 and 1924, while Pershing was Army chief of staff, Marshall worked on a number of projects that focused on training and teaching modern, mechanized warfare. He taught at the Army War College and was a key planner in the War Department. He then served as executive officer of the 15th Infantry Regiment in the Republic of China, where he remained for three years and learned to speak basic Mandarin. In 1927, as a lieutenant colonel, he was appointed assistant commandant of the Infantry School at Fort Benning, where he initiated major changes to modernize command and staff processes, which proved to be of major benefit during World War II. Marshall placed Edwin F. Harding in charge of the Infantry School's publications, and Harding became editor of Infantry in Battle, a book that codified the lessons of World War I. Infantry in Battle is still used as an officer's training manual in the Infantry Officer's Course and was the training manual for most of the infantry officers and leaders of World War II.

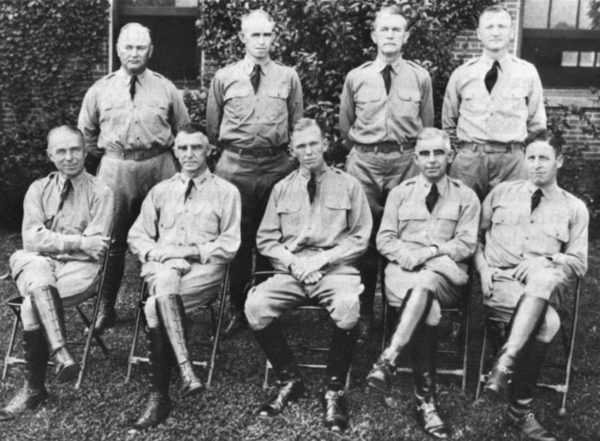
Lieutenant Colonel George C. Marshall (front row, center) as assistant commandant at the Infantry School in the 1930s, together with various instructors, three of whom later rose to high rank in the next world war.

Marshall's first wife, Elizabeth Carter "Lily" Coles, died in 1927. The following year, while stationed at Fort Benning, Marshall met Katherine Tupper Brown at a dinner party. They married on 15 October 1930, at Emmanuel Episcopal Church in Baltimore, Maryland. The wedding made headlines as General Pershing served as Marshall's best man.

From June 1932 to June 1933, Marshall was the commanding officer of the 8th Infantry Regiment at Fort Screven, Georgia. From July 1933 to October 1933 he was commander of Fort Moultrie, South Carolina, and District I of the Civilian Conservation Corps. He was promoted to colonel in September 1933.

During the Great Depression, Marshall became a strong supporter of President Franklin D. Roosevelt and the New Deal. Army chief of staff Douglas MacArthur, who was a Republican and with whom Marshall had a contentious relationship, did not appreciate Marshall's views. After only a few months at Ft. Moultrie, MacArthur engineered Marshall's abrupt transfer to Chicago, where he served as senior instructor and chief of staff for the Illinois National Guard's 33rd Division from November 1933 to August 1936.

Marshall was assigned to command the 5th Brigade of the 3rd Infantry Division and Vancouver Barracks in Vancouver, Washington, from 1936 to 1938, and was promoted to brigadier general in October 1936. In addition to obtaining a long-sought and significant troop command, traditionally viewed as an indispensable step to the pinnacle of the US Army, Marshall was also responsible for 35 Civilian Conservation Corps (CCC) camps in Oregon and southern Washington. As post commander Marshall made a concerted effort to cultivate relations with the city of Portland and to enhance the image of the US Army in the region. With the CCC, he initiated a series of measures to improve the morale of the participants and to make the experience beneficial in their later life. He started a newspaper for the CCC region that provided a vehicle to promote CCC successes, and he initiated a variety of programs that developed participants' skills and improved their health. Marshall's inspections of the CCC camps gave him and his wife Katherine the chance to enjoy the beauty of the American Pacific Northwest and made that assignment what he called "the most instructive service I ever had, and the most interesting."

In July 1938, Marshall was assigned to the War Plans Division in Washington, D.C., and subsequently reassigned as Deputy Chief of Staff. In that capacity, then-Brigadier General Marshall attended a White House conference at which President Franklin D. Roosevelt proposed a plan to expand the United States Army Air Corps by 15,000 aircraft per year in preparation for World War II. With all other attendees voicing support, Marshall was the only one to disagree, pointing out the lack of consideration for logistical support or training. Marshall also spoke in favor of a large ground army although Roosevelt had said a large air force would be a greater deterrent to enemies, pointing out that the United States Army did not yet have a single division at full operational strength. Despite others' belief then that Marshall had ended his career, his willingness to express disagreement resulted in Roosevelt nominating Marshall to be the Army Chief of Staff.

Upon the retirement of General Malin Craig on 1 July 1939, Marshall became acting chief of staff. Several generals were candidates to succeed Craig, including Hugh Aloysius Drum. Roosevelt favored Marshall because he was more supportive of New Deal liberalism than the conservative and still-influential Douglas MacArthur, who had been chief of staff from 1930 to 1935, and because of the recommendations of Pershing, Craig, Louis A. Johnson, and Roosevelt's close advisor Harry Hopkins. Marshall was sworn in as chief of staff on 1 September 1939, just hours after the Wehrmacht launched its invasion of Poland. He held this post until retiring in November 1945. At the time of the appointment, Marshall was 34th overall in seniority, outranked by 21 major generals and 11 brigadier generals, but was fifth in line for the position of chief of staff under an unwritten rule that candidates should be able to serve a full four-year term before reaching the mandatory retirement age of 64.

On 11 May 1940, the United States Congress cut $10 million from a $28 million appropriation budget for equipment to detect Imperial Japanese Armed Forces aircraft off the West Coast of the United States. Marshall met with Secretary of the Treasury Henry Morgenthau Jr. and they went to see Roosevelt; Marshall emphasized the supreme importance of getting the full amount and told Roosevelt "you have got to do something and you've got to do it today". Marshall's advocacy worked and he got "all he wanted and more".

In 1941, Marshall became a Freemason, raised "at sight" by the grand master of the Grand Lodge of the District of Columbia. ("At sight" is the procedure by which a grand master confers on a candidate all three Masonic degrees – Apprentice, Fellowcraft, and Master – at one time.)

== World War II ==
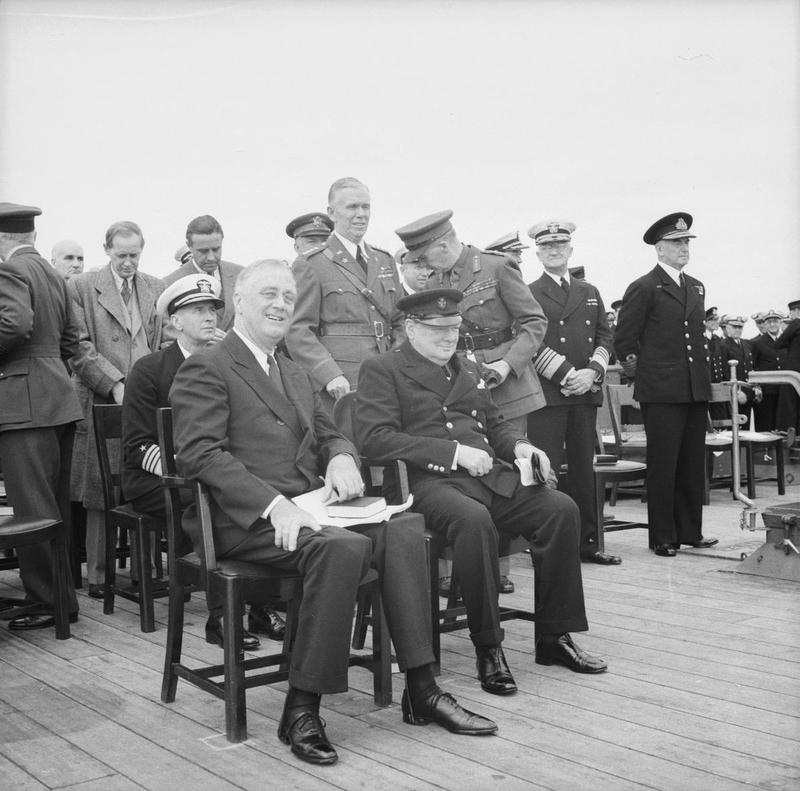
Marshall standing behind President Roosevelt and British prime minister Winston Churchill aboard the British battleship HMS Prince of Wales on 10 August 1941

As chief of staff, Marshall organized the largest military expansion in American history, inheriting an outmoded, poorly equipped Regular Army of 189,000 men and, partly drawing from his experience teaching and developing techniques of modern warfare as an instructor at the Army War College, coordinated the large-scale expansion and modernization of the U.S. Army. Under his name were produced significant works of doctrine such as Field Manual 100-5. During his first week in office, he advised Roosevelt to issue an executive order expanding the Regular Army to 227,000 troops and the National Guard to 235,000 reservists, although the president could not immediately act because the United States Congress still favored isolationism.

Marshall's efforts to expand the United States Armed Forces began to have more success after the Axis powers conquered most of Western Europe in the Battle of France. Beginning in July 1940, he was greatly assisted in this effort by newly appointed Secretary of War Henry Stimson, whom Marshall would gradually displace as the most significant leader of the U.S. military apparatus in a deviation from the United States' tradition of civilian control of the military. Though he had never actually led troops in combat, Marshall was a skilled organizer with a talent for inspiring other officers. Many of the American generals who were given top commands during the war were either picked or recommended by Marshall, including Dwight D. Eisenhower, Jacob L. Devers, George S. Patton, Terry de la Mesa Allen Sr., Lloyd Fredendall, Lesley J. McNair, Mark Wayne Clark and Omar Bradley. To make room for younger, more vigorous commanders, Marshall also moved to force out officers he considered unfit for the demands of wartime command, establishing in 1941 a selection-out body popularly known as the plucking board.

=== Expands military force fortyfold ===
Cover to the book Infantry in Battle, the World War II officer's guide to infantry combat operations. Marshall directed production of the book, which is still used as a reference today.

Faced with the necessity of turning former civilians into an army of over eight million soldiers by 1942 (a fortyfold increase within three years), Marshall directed McNair as commander of Army Ground Forces to focus efforts on rapidly producing large numbers of soldiers. With the exception of airborne forces, Marshall approved McNair's concept of an abbreviated training schedule for men entering Army land forces training, particularly in regard to basic infantry skills, weapons proficiency, and combat tactics. At the time, most U.S. commanders at lower levels had little or no combat experience of any kind. Without the input of experienced British or Allied combat officers on the nature of modern warfare and enemy tactics, many resorted to formulaic training methods emphasizing static defense and orderly large-scale advances by motorized convoys over improved roads. In consequence, Army forces deploying to Africa in Operation Torch suffered serious initial reverses when they encountered German armored units in Africa in the Battle of Kasserine Pass and other major battles. Even as late as 1944, American soldiers undergoing stateside training in preparation for deployment against German forces in Europe were not being trained in combat procedures and tactics in use there.

=== Replacement system criticized ===
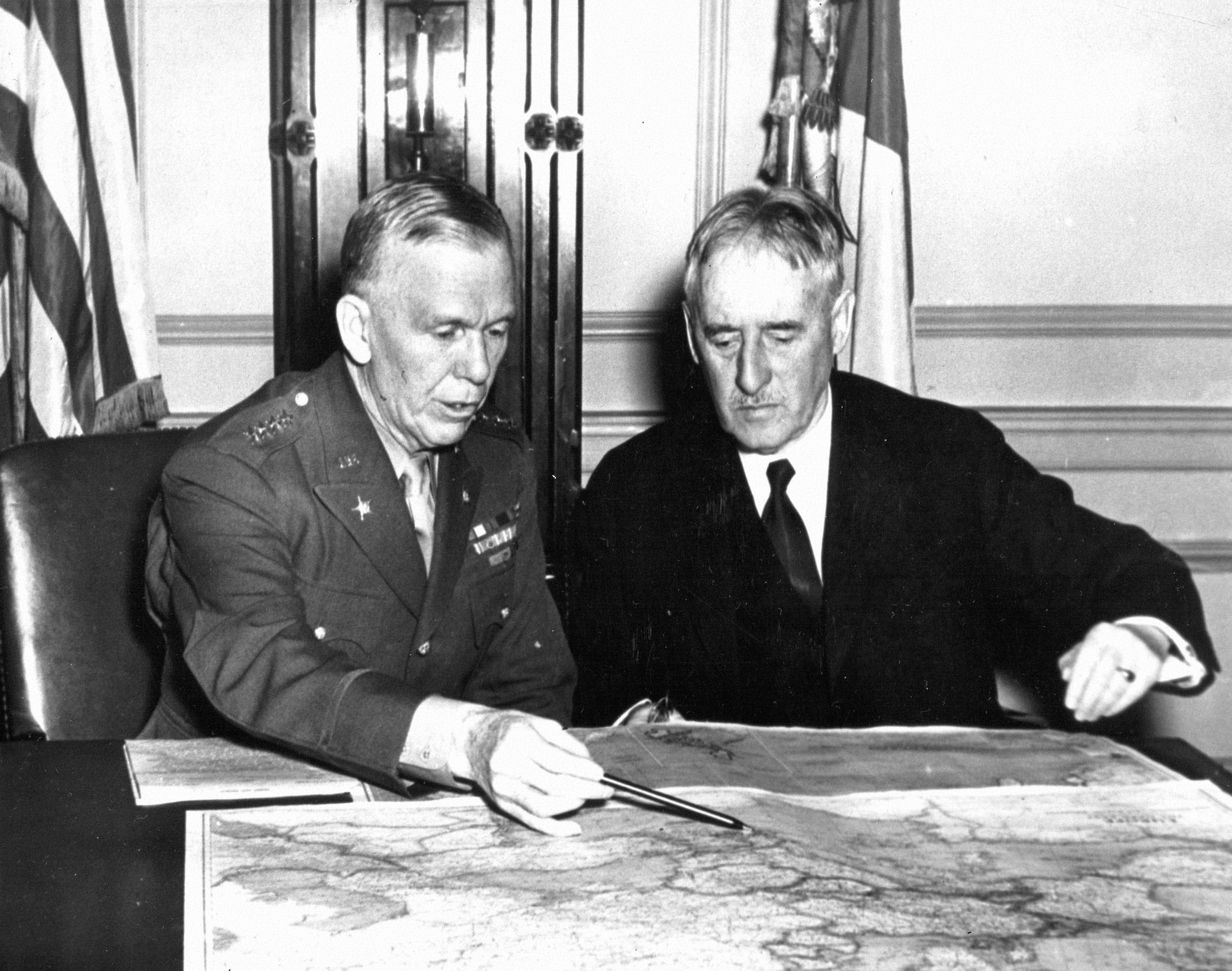
Army Chief of Staff Marshall with Secretary of War Henry Stimson

Originally, Marshall had planned a 265-division army with a system of unit rotation such as that practiced by the British and other Allies. By mid-1943, however, after pressure from government and business leaders to preserve manpower for industry and agriculture, he had abandoned this plan in favor of a 90-division Army using individual replacements sent via a circuitous process from training to divisions in combat. The individual replacement system devised by Marshall and implemented by McNair exacerbated problems with unit cohesion and effective transfer of combat experience to new soldiers and officers. In Europe, where there were few pauses in combat with German forces, the individual replacement system had broken down completely by late 1944. Hastily trained replacements or service personnel reassigned as infantry were often given only a few weeks' refresher training before being thrown into battle with Army divisions locked in front-line combat.

The new men were often not even proficient in the use of their own weapons, and once in combat, could not receive enough practical instruction from veterans before being killed or wounded, sometimes within the first few days. Under such conditions, many soldiers suffered a crippling loss of morale, while veterans were kept at the front until they were killed, wounded, or incapacitated by battle fatigue or illness. Incidents of soldiers going AWOL from combat duty as well as battle fatigue and self-inflicted injury rose rapidly during the last eight months of the war with Nazi Germany. As one historian concluded, "Had the Germans been given a free hand to devise a replacement system..., one that would do the Americans the most harm and the least good, they could not have done a better job."

Marshall's abilities to pick competent field commanders during the early part of the war was decidedly mixed. He was instrumental in advancing the careers of the highly capable generals such as Dwight D. Eisenhower, Omar Bradley, George S. Patton, Walter Krueger and Mark W. Clark. A notable exception was his recommendation of the swaggering Lloyd Fredendall to Eisenhower for a major command in the American invasion of North Africa during Operation Torch. Marshall was especially fond of Fredendall, describing him as "one of the best" and remarking in a staff meeting when his name was mentioned, "I like that man; you can see determination all over his face." Eisenhower duly picked him to command the 39,000-man Central Task Force (the largest of three) in Operation Torch. Both men would come to regret that decision, as Fredendall was the leader of U.S. Army forces at the disastrous Battle of Kasserine Pass.

=== Planned invasion of Europe ===
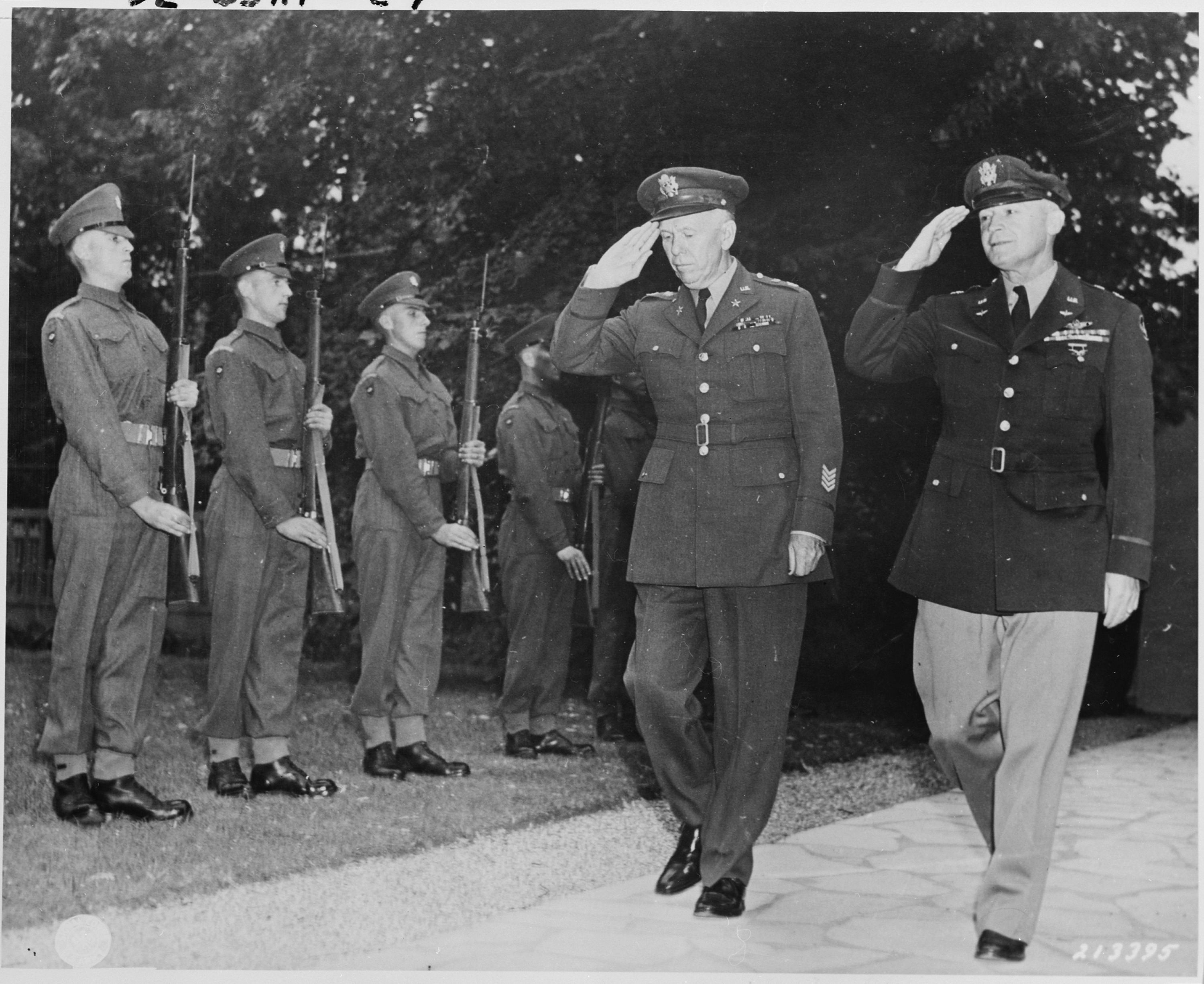
General George C. Marshall with Chief of the Army Air Force General Henry "Hap" Arnold at Villa Urbig on 23 July 1945 during the Potsdam Conference. The two generals return the salute of the Guard of Honor formed by a detachment of Scots Guards of the British Brigade of Guards.

During World War II, Marshall was instrumental in preparing the U.S. Army and Army Air Forces for the invasion of Continental Europe. Marshall wrote the document that would become the central strategy for all Allied operations in Europe. During the Arcadia Conference, he convinced the United Kingdom to accept this strategy, including the focus on defeating Germany first and the establishment of international unified commands in control of all Allied forces in a given theatre. His push for unity of command, in particular through the Combined Chiefs of Staff and the American-British-Dutch-Australian Command, met with resistance from the British Armed Forces under Alan Brooke because the scheme would allow the United States to dominate the Western Allied war effort, but the British government ultimately approved.

He initially scheduled Operation Overlord for 1 April 1943, but met with strong opposition from Winston Churchill, who convinced Roosevelt to commit troops to Operation Husky for the invasion of Italy. Marshall and his advisors also opposed the Allied invasion of French North Africa after it became clear that Vichy France would offer resistance, concerns over an Axis intervention through Francoist Spain and Gibraltar, and suspicions that the operation was intended to defend European colonial territory with little strategic value to the war.

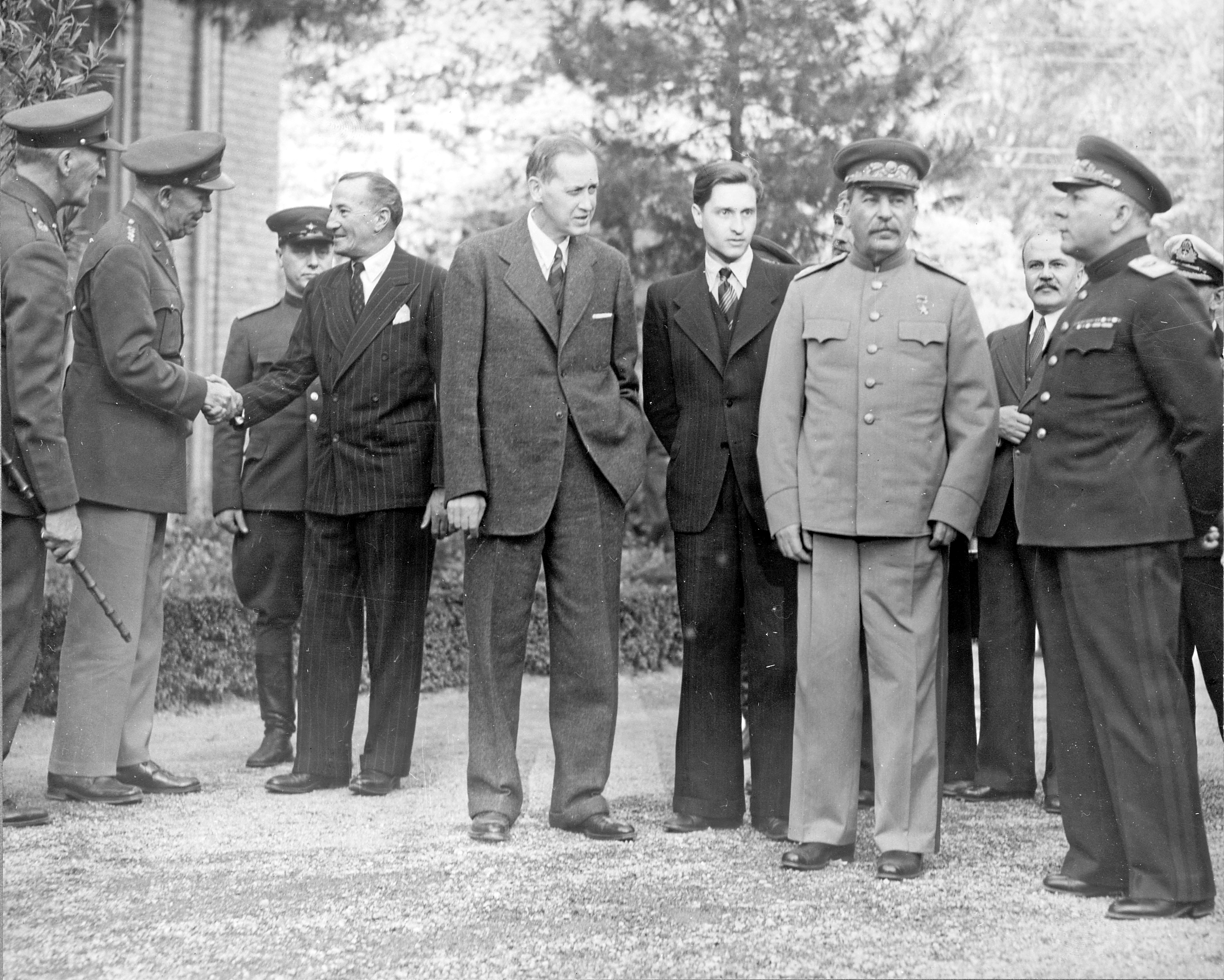
Marshall with Joseph Stalin, Vyacheslav Molotov, and Harry Hopkins at the Tehran Conference in Iran, December 1943

When rumors circulated that Marshall would become the Supreme Commander of Operation Overlord, many critics viewed the potential transfer as a demotion, since he would leave his position as Chief of Staff of the Army and lose his seat on the Combined Chiefs of Staff. While Marshall enjoyed considerable success in working with Congress and Roosevelt, he refused to lobby for the position. Roosevelt selected Eisenhower, in large part because he did not want to do without Marshall in the Chief of Staff position. He told Marshall, "I didn't feel I could sleep at ease if you were out of Washington."

On 16 December 1944, Marshall became the first American general to be promoted to the newly created rank of general of the Army, a five-star rank that placed senior American commanders on an equal footing with the field marshals of European Allies; Marshall had objected to being awarded the title of field marshal, as it would have given him the title of "Marshal Marshall".

Throughout the remainder of World War II, Marshall coordinated Allied operations in both Europe and the Pacific. He was characterized as the organizer of Allied victory by Churchill. Time magazine named Marshall Man of the Year for 1943. Marshall resigned his post of chief of staff on 18 November 1945, but did not retire, as regulations stipulate that generals of the Army remain on active duty for life. He was succeeded as Army chief of staff by General of the Army Dwight Eisenhower. During this time, he also received a Bronze oak leaf cluster to his Army DSM for his unprecedented work from 1939 to 1945. The medal's citation reads:

The President of the United States of America, authorized by Act of Congress 9 July 1918, takes pleasure in presenting a Bronze Oak Leaf Cluster in lieu of a Second Award of the Army Distinguished Service Medal to General of the Army George Catlett Marshall, Jr. (ASN: 0-1616), United States Army, for exceptionally meritorious and distinguished services to the Government of the United States, in a duty of great responsibility during the period from September 1939 through November 1945. The singularly distinctive accomplishments of General Marshall reflect the highest credit upon himself and the United States Army.

=== Analysis of Pearl Harbor intelligence failure ===
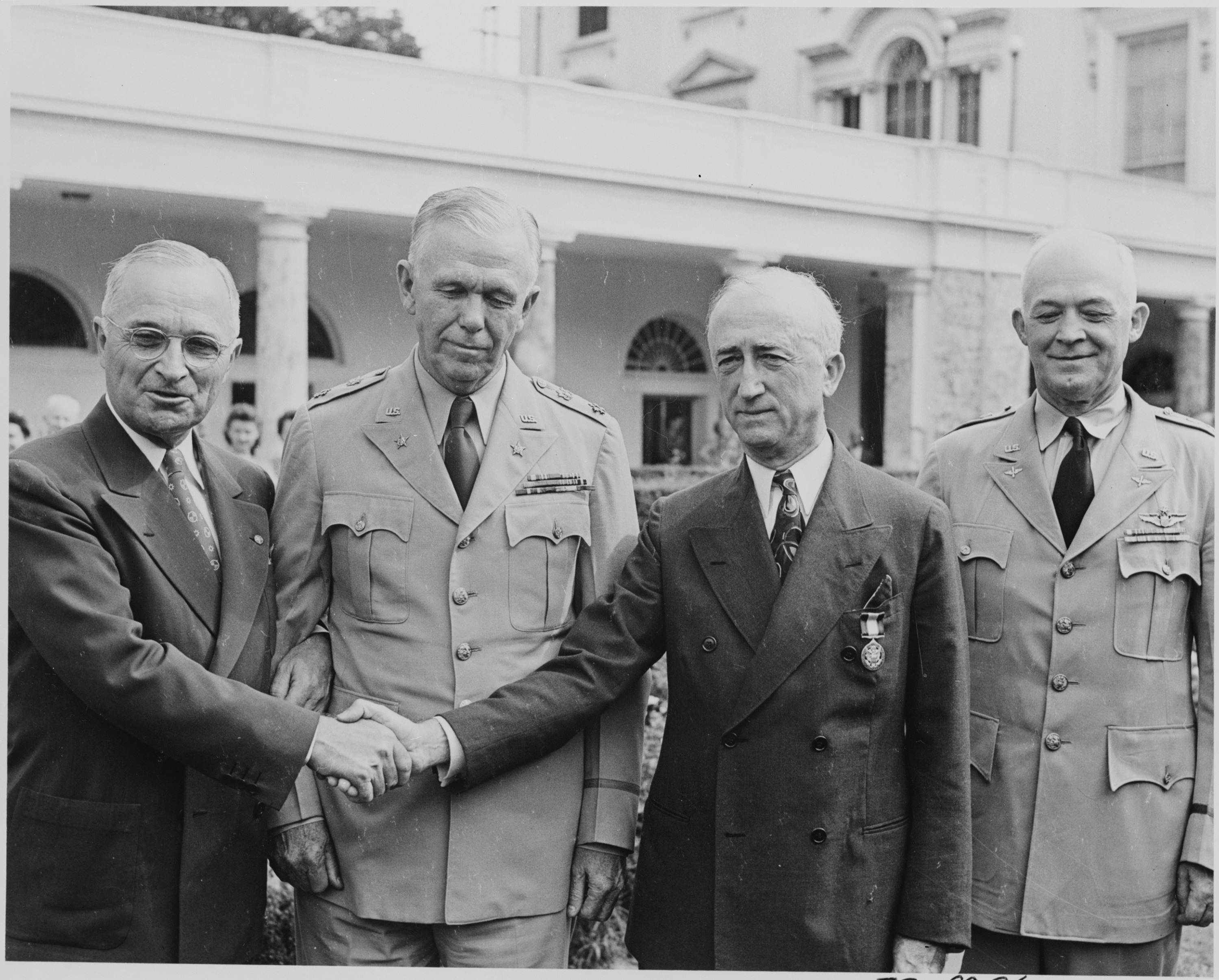
President Truman, Marshall, Secretary of State James F. Byrnes, and General Arnold at the White House, August 1945

After World War II ended, the Congressional Joint Committee on the Investigation of the Pearl Harbor Attack received testimony on the intelligence failure. It amassed 25,000 pages of documents, 40 volumes, and included nine reports and investigations, eight of which had been previously completed. These reports included criticism of Marshall for delaying sending Lieutenant General Walter Short, the Army commander in Hawaii, important information obtained from intercepted Japanese diplomatic messages. The report also criticized Marshall's lack of knowledge of the readiness of the Hawaiian Command during November and December 1941. Marshall also advised President Roosevelt to move part of the United States Pacific Fleet to the Atlantic Ocean to assist Neutrality Patrols, and that the defenses at Oahu made a Japanese attack on the island impossible. These recommendations were dismissed by the president but could have been catastrophic if they had not been.

Ten days after the attack, Short and Admiral Husband E. Kimmel, commander of the United States Pacific Fleet at Naval Station Pearl Harbor, were both relieved of their duties. The final report of the Joint Committee did not single out or fault Marshall. While the report was critical of the overall situation, the committee noted that subordinates had failed to pass on important information to their superiors, including to Marshall.

Secretary of War Henry Stimson authorized a secret review of the Army's role by Henry Clausen. The Clausen Report was critical of Short and also of Colonel Rufus S. Bratton of the Military Intelligence Division (G-2). Clausen concluded that Bratton arrived at the War Department later on the morning of 7 December 1941 than he initially claimed during testimony. Clausen also found that Bratton invented the story that the warning to affected Army commanders of the imminent Pearl Harbor attack was delayed because he had been unable to reach Marshall, an allegation which "nearly destroyed" Marshall.

== Mission to China ==
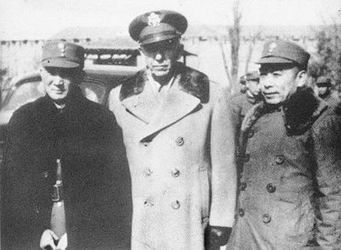
General Marshall with Zhang Zhizhong and Zhou Enlai in China, 1946

Only weeks after Marshall's retirement, in December 1945, President Harry Truman dispatched Marshall to the Republic of China, where he had served in the 1920s. His new mission was to prevent a resumption of the Chinese Civil War by brokering a coalition government between America's Kuomintang allies under Generalissimo Chiang Kai-shek and the Chinese Communist Party of Mao Zedong. Marshall had no leverage over the Communists but threatened to withdraw American aid essential to the Nationalists. Both sides rejected his proposals and he returned to the United States in January 1947. As Secretary of State, Marshall disagreed with the Defense and State Department views that Chiang's success was vital to American interests, insisting that U.S. troops not become involved. The war continued, and the Communists won in 1949.

== Secretary of State ==
After Marshall's return to the U.S. in early 1947, Truman appointed him Secretary of State. As one of the most well-regarded and least politicized national leaders, he made an ideal front office personality. He became the spokesman for the State Department's ambitious plans to rebuild Europe. He did not design the plans and paid little attention to details or negotiations. He also did not keep himself up-to-date with details of foreign affairs. As one biographer notes, he had never been a workaholic. He turned over major responsibilities to his deputies, especially Under-Secretary Robert A. Lovett, and refused to be troubled by minutiae. By 1948, with his frailties building up, his participation was further curtailed. Marshall said, "The fact of the matter is that Lovett bears the principal burden as I get away whenever possible."

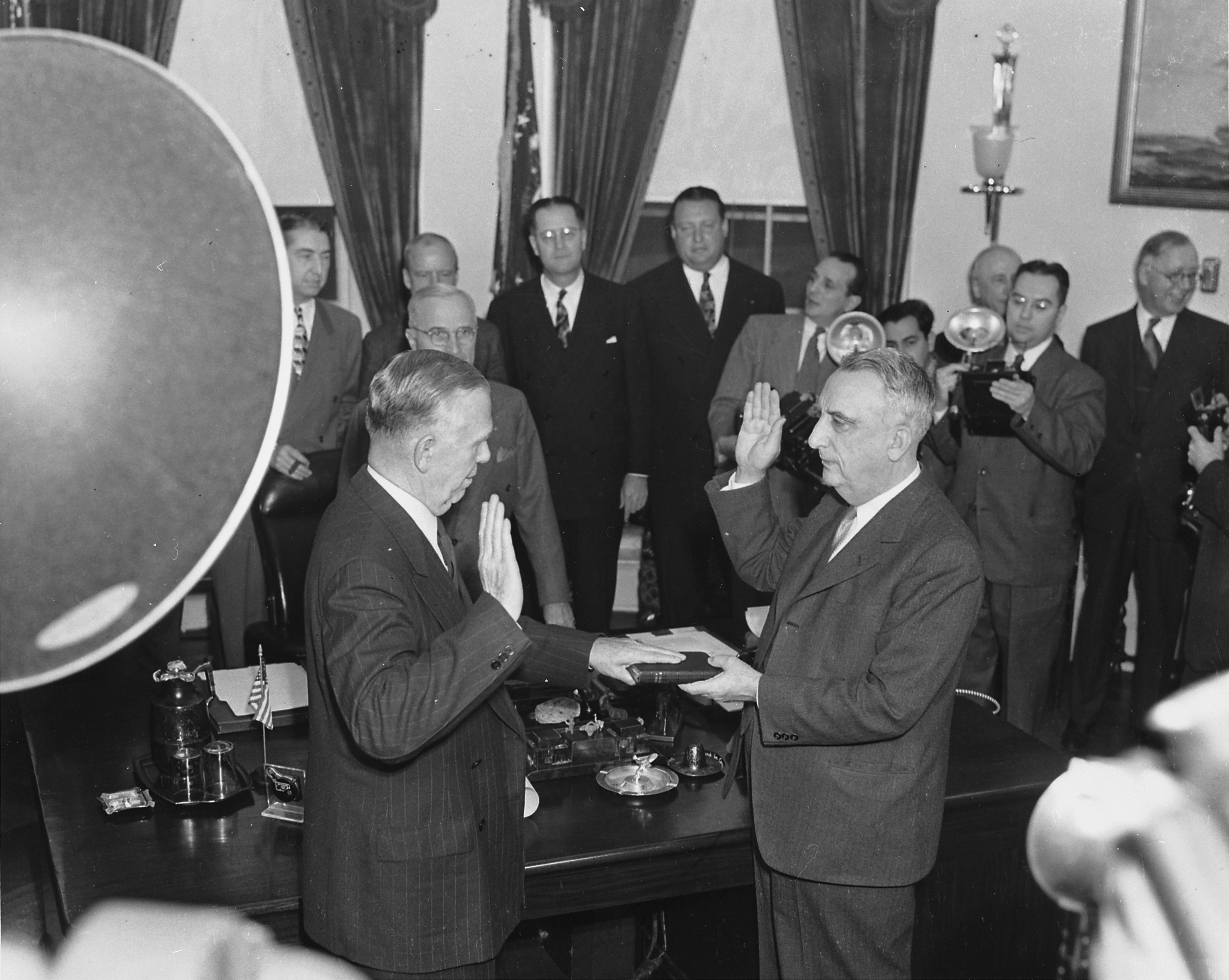
General Marshall being sworn in as Secretary of State by Chief Justice Fred Vinson in the Oval Office on 21 January 1947

On 5 June 1947, in a speech at Harvard University, he outlined the American proposal. The European Recovery Program, as it was formally known, became known as the Marshall Plan. Clark Clifford had suggested to Truman that the plan be called the Truman Plan, but Truman immediately dismissed that idea and insisted that it be called the Marshall Plan. The Marshall Plan would help Europe rebuild and modernize its economy along American lines and open up new opportunities for international trade. Stalin ordered his satellites in Eastern Europe not to participate. Marshall was again named "Man of the Year" by Time in January 1948.

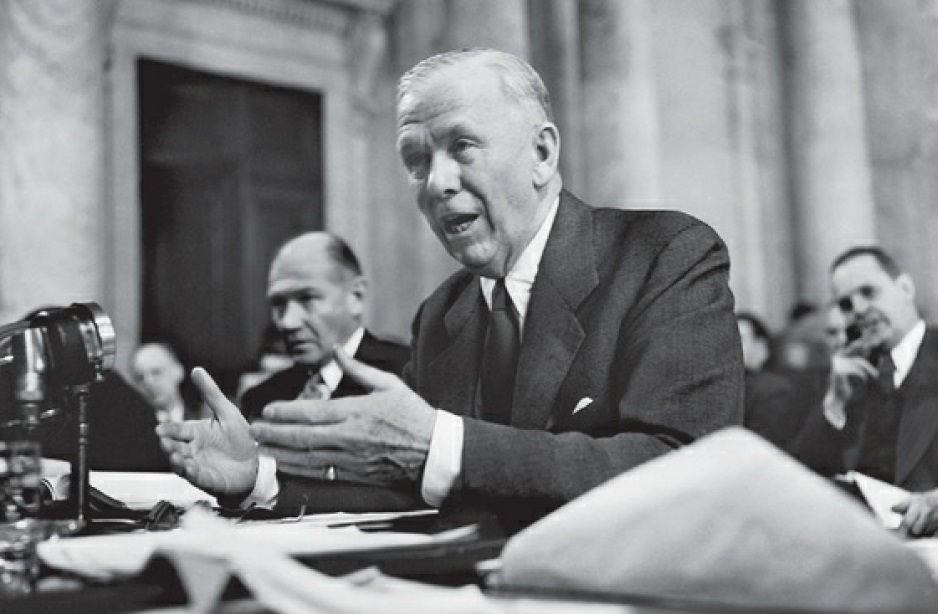
Secretary of State Marshall speaks to the House Appropriations Committee. 15 January 1948

Truman repeatedly rejected Marshall's advice on Middle Eastern policy. As Secretary of State, Marshall strongly opposed recognizing the newly formed state of Israel. Marshall felt that if the state of Israel was declared, a war would break out in the Middle East (which it did when the 1948 Arab–Israeli War began one day after Israel declared independence). Marshall saw recognizing the Jewish state as a political move to gain American Jewish support in the upcoming election, in which Truman was expected to lose to Thomas E. Dewey. He told President Truman in May 1948, "If you [recognize the state of Israel] and if I were to vote in the election, I would vote against you." However, Marshall refused to vote in any election as a matter of principle. (Note: Marshall even went to great lengths to prevent himself from falling prey to the allures of power. He had always refused to vote because he subscribed to the belief that a professional soldier should remain above politics, but he took other steps to insulate himself from the corrupting influence of power once he became chief of staff (Uldrich 2005).) (Note: "General Marshall could see the President anytime, but being a general he never took advantage of this. In fact, on one occasion, I think it was over Palestine actually, he told the President – I was told by somebody at the meeting – "Mr. President, if you take this action I wouldn't vote for you, but of course I don't vote." He as an Army officer never voted apparently in his life" (McKinzie 1972).)

During his tenure as Secretary of State, Marshall also urged Truman to immediately call for The Netherlands to stop their invasion of Indonesia, a former Dutch colony which had declared independence in 1945. The Netherlands ignored the Truman administration's initial entreaties. As a result, the Marshall Plan program for the Netherlands' economic recovery was put on hold and the Truman administration threatened to cut all economic aid. The Netherlands finally agreed to withdraw and transferred sovereignty following the Dutch–Indonesian Round Table Conference in 1949.

Marshall resigned as Secretary of State because of ill health on 7 January 1949. He was severely exhausted throughout his tenure in the position. Dean Acheson in late 1947 said he was underperforming like "a four-engine bomber going only on one engine." Truman named him to the largely honorific positions of chairman of the American Battle Monuments Commission and president of the American National Red Cross. He received the 1953 Nobel Peace Prize for his post-war work, despite the criticism that he was a warrior and not a pacifist.

== Secretary of Defense ==
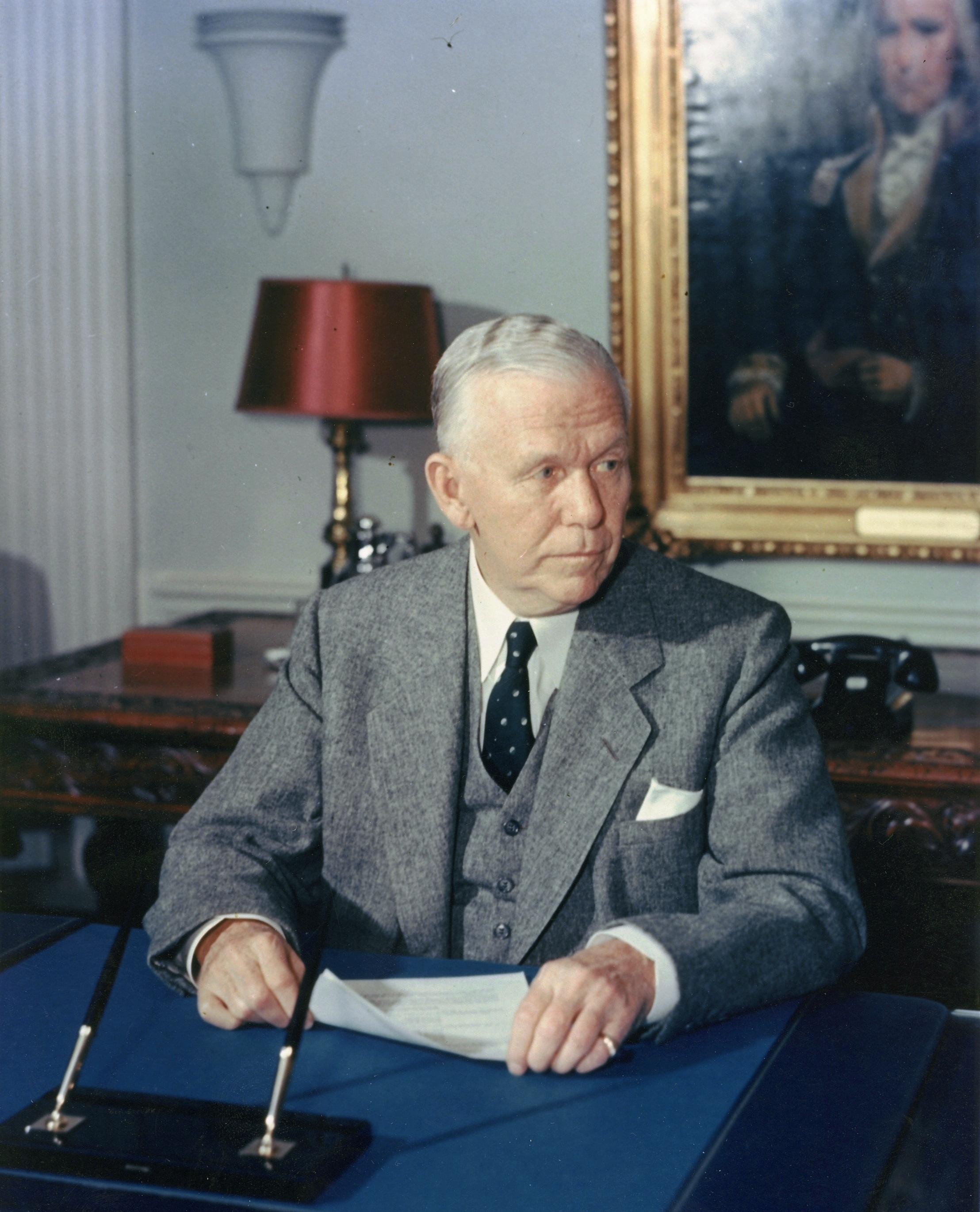
Secretary of Defense George C. Marshall in his office at the Pentagon

When the early months of the Korean War showed how poorly prepared the Defense Department was, President Truman fired Secretary Louis A. Johnson and named Marshall as Secretary of Defense in September 1950. The appointment required a congressional waiver because the National Security Act of 1947 prohibited a uniformed military officer from serving in the post. This prohibition included Marshall since individuals promoted to General of the Army are not technically retired but remain officially on active duty. Marshall was the first person to be granted such a waiver; in 2017, Jim Mattis became the second and in January 2021, General Lloyd Austin became the third. Marshall's main role as Secretary of Defense was to restore confidence and morale to the Defense Department while rebuilding the United States Armed Forces following their post-World War II demobilization.

=== Korean War ===
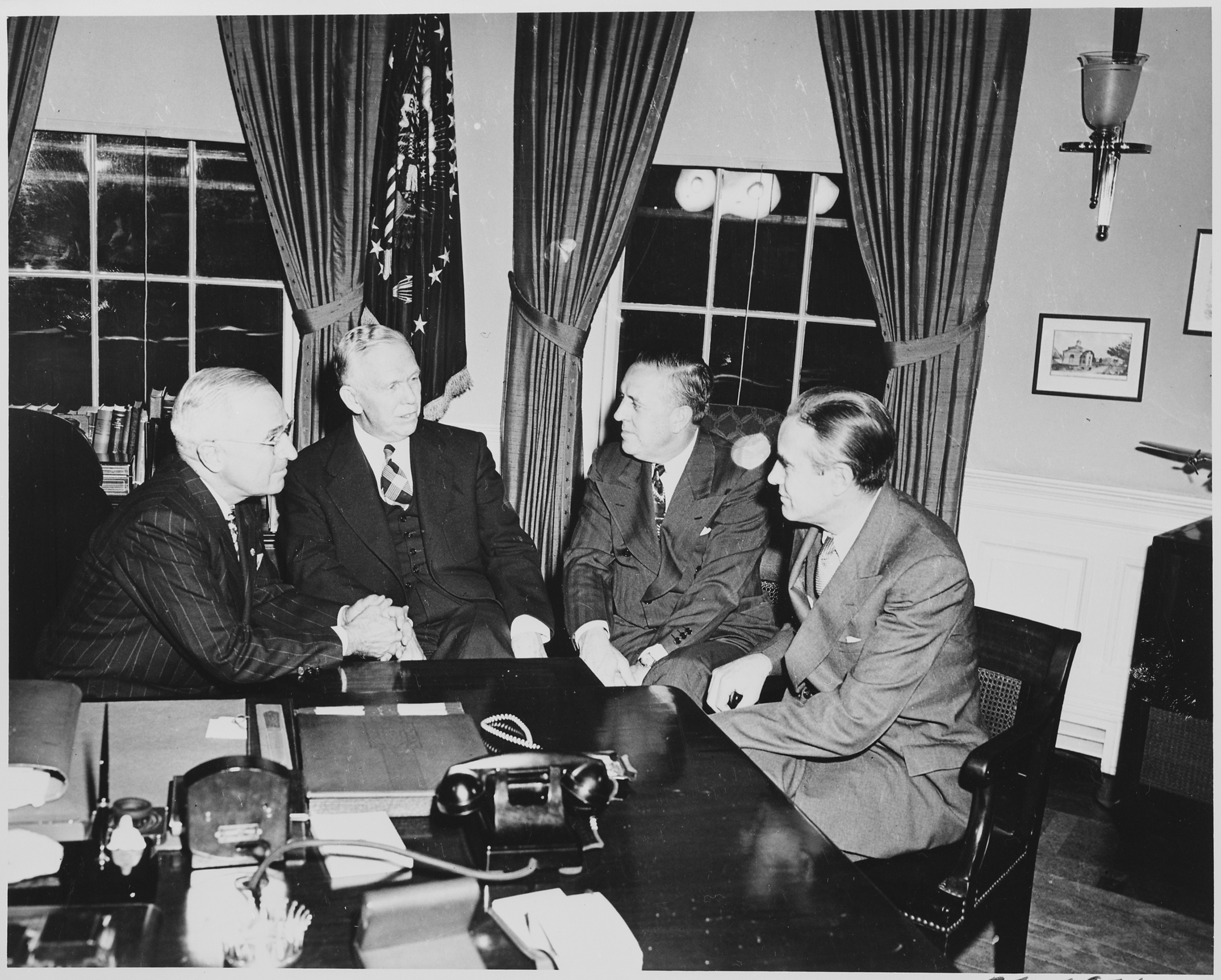
Secretary of Defense George C. Marshall discussing the Korean War with President Truman and Special Assistant to the President Averell Harriman in the Oval Office

Marshall worked to provide more manpower to meet the demands of both the Korean War and the Cold War in Europe. To implement his priorities Marshall brought in a new leadership team, including Robert A. Lovett as his deputy and Anna M. Rosenberg, former head of the War Manpower Commission, as assistant secretary of defense for manpower. He also worked to rebuild the relationship between the Defense and State Departments, as well as the relationship between the secretary of defense and the Joint Chiefs of Staff.

Marshall participated in the post-Inchon landing discussion that led to authorizing Douglas MacArthur to conduct the UN offensive into North Korea. A secret "eyes only" signal from Marshall to MacArthur on 29 September 1950, declared the Truman administration's commitment: "We want you to feel unhampered strategically and tactically to proceed north of the 38th Parallel". At the same time, Marshall advised against public pronouncements which might lead to United Nations votes undermining or countermanding the initial mandate to restore the border between North and South Korea. Marshall and the Joint Chiefs of Staff were generally supportive of MacArthur because they were of the view that field commanders should be able to exercise their best judgment in accomplishing the intent of their superiors.

Following Chinese military intervention in Korea during late November, Marshall and the Joint Chiefs of Staff sought ways to aid MacArthur while avoiding all-out war with China. In the debate over what to do about China's increased involvement, Marshall opposed a cease-fire on the grounds that it would make the U.S. look weak in China's eyes, leading to demands for future concessions. In addition, Marshall argued that the U.S. had a moral obligation to honor its commitment to South Korea. When British Prime Minister Clement Attlee suggested diplomatic overtures to China, Marshall opposed, arguing that it was impossible to negotiate with the Communist government. In addition, Marshall expressed concern that concessions to China would undermine confidence in the U.S. among its Asian allies, including Japan and the Philippines. When some in Congress favored expanding the war in Korea and confronting China, Marshall argued against a wider war in Korea, continuing instead to stress the importance of containing the Soviet Union during the Cold War battle for primacy in Europe.

==== Relief of General MacArthur ====
Increasingly concerned about public statements from MacArthur, commander of United Nations Command forces fighting in the Korean War, which contradicted President Truman's on prosecution of the war, on the morning of 6 April 1951, Truman held a meeting with Marshall, Chairman of the Joint Chiefs of Staff Omar Bradley, Secretary of State Dean Acheson, and advisor W. Averell Harriman to discuss whether MacArthur should be removed from command.

Harriman was emphatically in favor of MacArthur's relief, but Bradley opposed it. Marshall asked for more time to consider the matter. Acheson was in favor but did not disclose this, instead warning Truman that if he did it, MacArthur's relief would cause "the biggest fight of your administration." At another meeting the following day, Marshall and Bradley continued to oppose MacArthur's relief. On 8 April, the Joint Chiefs of Staff met with Marshall, and each expressed the view that MacArthur's relief was desirable from a "military point of view," suggesting that "if MacArthur were not relieved, a large segment of our people would charge that civil authorities no longer controlled the military."

Marshall, Bradley, Acheson, and Harriman met with Truman again on 9 April. Bradley informed the president of the views of the Joint Chiefs, and Marshall added that he agreed with them. Truman wrote in his diary that "it is of unanimous opinion of all that MacArthur be relieved. All four so advise." (The Joint Chiefs would later insist that they had only "concurred" with the relief, not "recommended" it.)

On 11 April 1951, Truman directed transmittal of an order to MacArthur, issued over Bradley's signature, relieving MacArthur of his assignment in Korea and directing him to turn over command to Matthew Ridgway. In line with Marshall's view, and those of the Joint Chiefs of Staff, MacArthur's relief was looked upon by proponents as being necessary to reassert the tenet of civilian control of the military.

== Later life ==
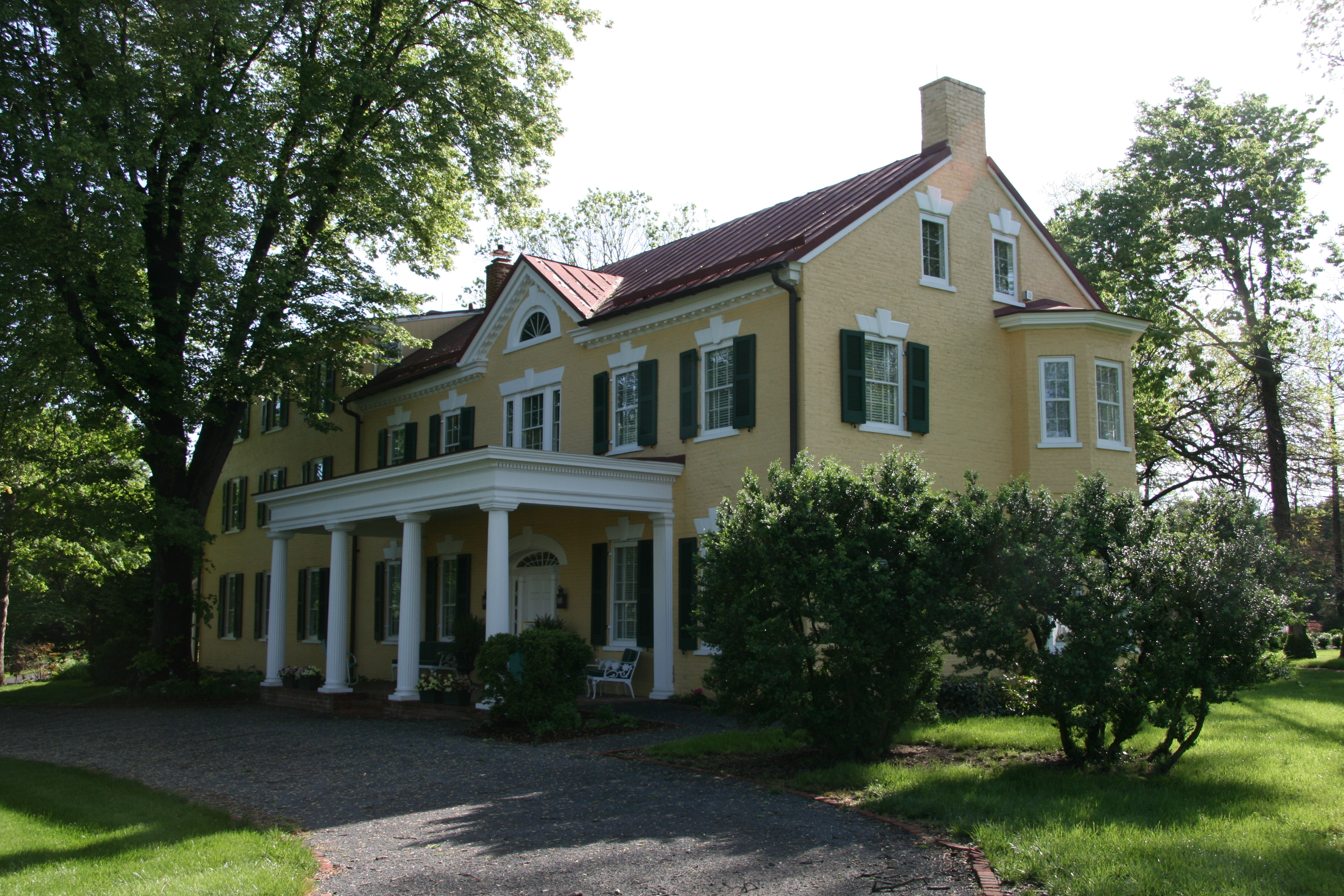
Dodona Manor, the 19th century home and gardens of George Marshall and his wife Katherine

=== Retirement ===
In September 1951, after 49 years of continuous public service, Marshall retired to his home, Dodona Manor, in Leesburg, Virginia. Purchased by the Marshalls in 1941, Dodona had previously served as a quiet weekend retreat for the busy couple. The home was restored beginning in the 1990s and the house and its gardens are open to the public as a museum.

It was at Dodona Manor that Marshall enjoyed his favorite food, roast leg of lamb, and his favorite beverage, an old fashioned. Gardening was one of Marshall's favorite pastimes, and in retirement he grew vegetables throughout the year, including tomatoes and pumpkins, while Katherine Marshall enjoyed tending to her rose garden. In a 1942 letter to David Burpee, president of W. Atlee Burpee & Company, Marshall wrote, "The business of seeds and flowers tantalizes me because I have been an amateur gardener, both flower and vegetable, since a boy of ten. There is nothing I would so much prefer to do this spring as to turn my mind to the wholesome business of gardening rather than the terrible problems and tragedies of war."

Katherine's love of roses was well known, leading inventor Eugene S. Boerner to create the Katherine Tupper Marshall Rose, a pink hybrid tea rose. It was patented by Jackson and Perkins in 1943.

=== American Battle Monuments Commission ===
Throughout his retirement, Marshall served as chairman of the American Battle Monuments Commission. He oversaw the construction of fourteen cemeteries in eight countries following World War II to memorialize those killed or missing in battle. In the early 1950s, Marshall argued for the speedy construction and funding of cemeteries despite budget and staff cuts for the Korean War. Marshall wrote to General Joseph McNarney in March 1951 saying, "I am naturally hesitant to become personally involved in individual personnel problems, but in this case, am deeply concerned about the overall morale factor if our foreign national cemeteries are not adequately maintained...." Marshall's efforts to secure building and maintenance staff for the cemeteries were successful, doubling the number of military officers assigned to the work. On 13 September 1952, Marshall attended the dedication ceremony of Suresnes American Cemetery in France.

=== Coronation of Queen Elizabeth II ===
After retiring, Marshall largely withdrew from public life. A notable exception was in June 1953, when he accepted President Eisenhower's appointment to head the American delegation to the coronation of Queen Elizabeth II. The delegation included Earl Warren and Omar Bradley, and according to Bradley and Marshall's aide Colonel C. J. George, as Marshall walked up the aisle of Westminster Abbey to take his seat before the ceremony, the congregation rose to its feet as a gesture of respect. Marshall looked behind him to see who the arriving dignitary was, then realized the congregation had stood for him. Marshall was also invited to the post-ceremony banquet at Buckingham Palace, and was the only non-royal seated at Queen Elizabeth's table.

== Family life ==
Cover of Together: Annals of an Army Wife, by Katherine Tupper Marshall. Published 1946.

George Marshall was the youngest of three siblings. His older brother Stuart Bradford Marshall (1875–1956) was a graduate of the Virginia Military Institute and became a manager and executive in several metal production corporations, including the American Manganese Manufacturing Company. He later worked as a metallurgist and consulting engineer specializing in the production and operation of blast furnaces, coke ovens, and foundries. George and Stuart Marshall were long estranged because George married Lily Coles, who a few years before had rejected Stuart's proposal. When Stuart found out George was engaged to Lily, Stuart made unkind remarks about her, and George "cut him off my list." Marshall's sister, Marie Louise (1876–1962) was the wife of John Johnston Singer (1879–1934), an Army physician.

On 11 February 1902, Marshall married Elizabeth Carter "Lily" Coles at her mother's home in Lexington, Virginia. Marshall met Lily after listening to her play the piano across the street from VMI. Marshall, being immediately smitten, would "run the block", or leave barracks after hours, to be with her. After traveling abroad to Japan, Korea, and China with Marshall, Lily returned to the U.S. to have a goiter removed. She died on 15 September 1927, after thyroid surgery that strained her weak heart. They did not have children.

On 15 October 1930, Marshall married Katherine Boyce Tupper (8 October 1882 – 18 December 1978); General Pershing served as Marshall's best man. They had no children, but she was the mother of three children with Baltimore lawyer Clifton Stevenson Brown. He had been murdered by a disgruntled client in 1928. The second Mrs. Marshall was a graduate of the American Academy of Dramatic Arts; she later studied at the Comédie-Française and toured with Frank Benson's English Shakespearean Company. She authored a memoir in 1946, Together: Annals of an Army Wife.

One of Marshall's stepsons, Allen Tupper Brown (1916–1944), was an Army lieutenant who was killed in Italy on 29 May 1944. Another stepson was Major Clifton Stevenson Brown Jr. (1914–1952). Stepdaughter Molly Brown Winn (1912–1997), the mother of actress Kitty Winn, was married to Colonel James Julius Winn (1907–1990), who had been an aide to Marshall. Molly Winn was active in preserving Marshall's legacy, including preserving Dodona Manor and publishing Marshall's World War I memoirs.

== Death and burial ==
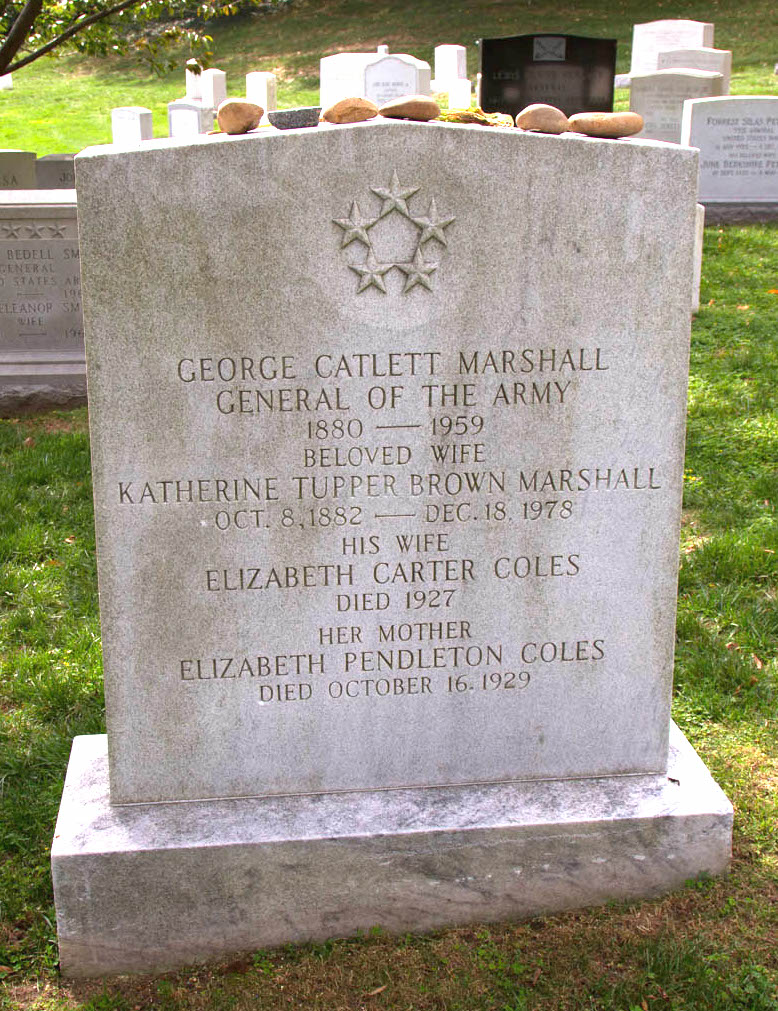
Grave site of George Marshall at Arlington National Cemetery

After a series of strokes, Marshall died at Walter Reed Hospital in Washington, D.C., on 16 October 1959, two months shy of his 79th birthday. Although he was entitled to official proceedings, Marshall preferred simplicity, so he received a special military funeral that dispensed with many of the usual activities. The ceremonies included lying in state at Washington National Cathedral for 24 hours, guarded by representatives from each U.S. armed service and a VMI cadet.

President Eisenhower ordered flags flown at half-staff and was among the 200 guests invited for the funeral service held at Fort Myer. Other dignitaries included former President Truman, Secretary of State Christian A. Herter, former Secretary of State Dean Acheson, former Governor W. Averell Harriman and Generals Omar N. Bradley, Alfred M. Gruenther, and Matthew B. Ridgway. His parish priest, Franklin Moss Jr., from St. James Episcopal Church in Leesburg conducted the chapel and graveside services, assisted by former chief chaplain and National Cathedral Canon the Reverend Luther Miller. In accordance with Marshall's wishes, there was no eulogy. Following the burial service, an artillery battery fired a 19-gun salute and a bugler played taps. The flag that draped Marshall's casket was folded and given to Mrs. Marshall by a VMI cadet.

Marshall was buried at Arlington National Cemetery, Section 7, Grave 8198, beside his first wife and her mother, Elizabeth Pendleton Coles (1849–1929). His second wife was also buried with him after she died on 18 December 1978. On its reverse side, the marble headstone lists General Marshall's positions held: "Chief of Staff U.S. Army, Secretary of State, President of American Red Cross, Secretary of Defense." The five-star rank adorns both sides of the stone.

== Reputation and legacy ==
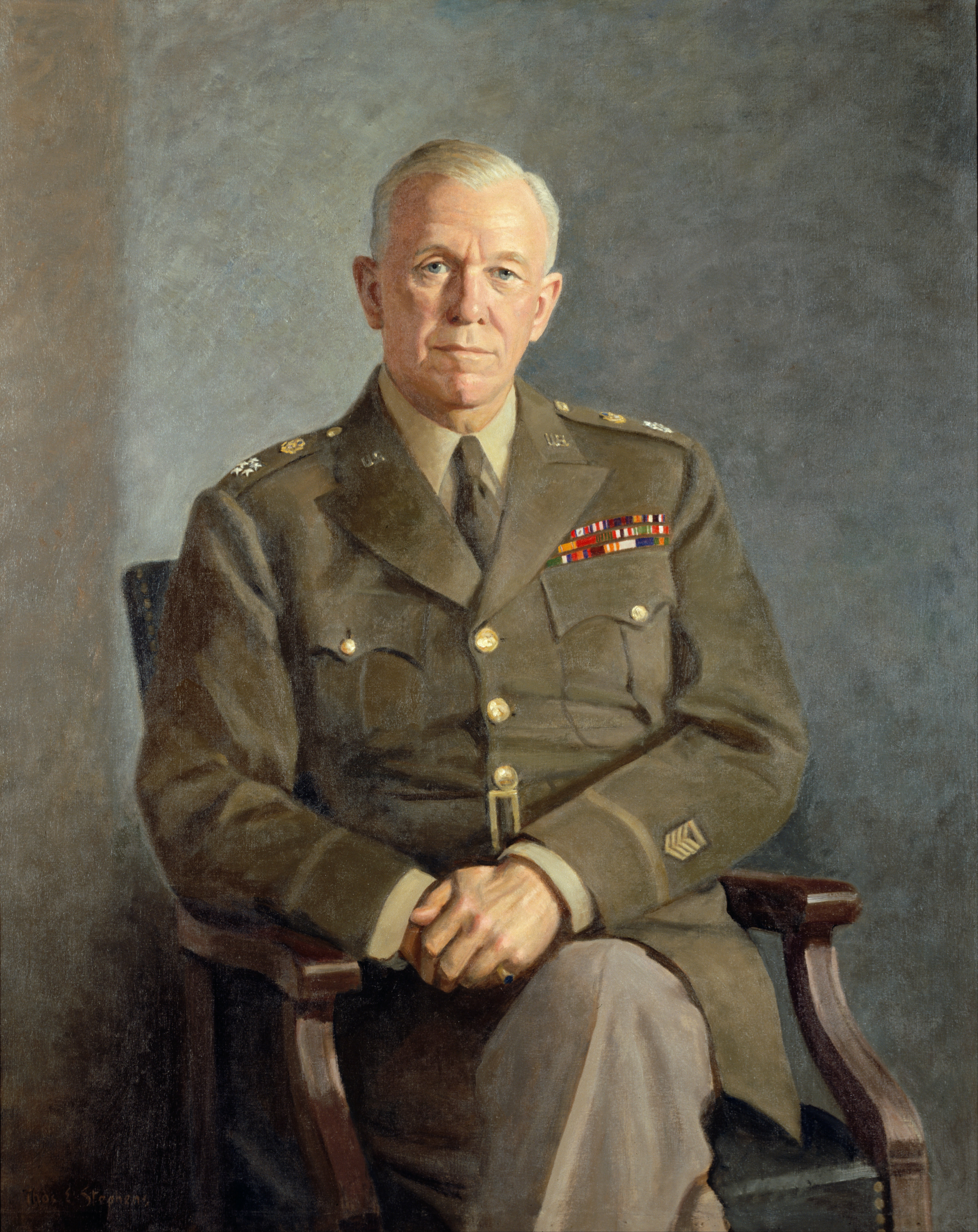
George Marshall portrait by Thomas E. Stephens (c. 1949)

As William Taylor and other historians have recently emphasized, George Marshall was the best-known and most active – and most selfless – American leader in the early Cold War. His leadership had a distinct, signature style which contained "Disdain for false speaking and dissembling", "Aura of Authority" and "Immensity of Integrity". He viewed his world in definitive black and white with no vagueness in arguments or gray areas in decision-making. Marshall is best known for giving his name and prestige to the Marshall Plan to rebuild the European economy. However, he suffered several defeats – he failed in the year-long effort to resolve the Chinese Civil War; he was defeated in his proposal to impose universal military service on all American men; and he was overruled by President Truman when he opposed the recognition of Israel. Historians agree that Truman depended heavily upon Marshall's prestige at a time of intensely bitter partisanship. Wilson Miscamble points to Marshall's delayed recognition of the threat posed by the Soviet Union – not until April 1947 did he realize the dangers. Miscamble concludes that recent studies show that Marshall was:

An important contributor but hardly a dominant figure in the making of postwar American foreign policy. He had a special gift for delegation and he drew forth impressive contributions from various capable subordinates.

Marshall's reputation for excellence as a military organizer and planner was recognized early in his career and became known throughout the Army. In a performance appraisal prepared while Marshall was a lieutenant in the Philippines, his superior, Captain E. J. Williams responded to the routine question of whether he would want the evaluated officer to serve under his command again by writing of Marshall "Should the exigencies of active service place him in exalted command I would be glad to serve under him." (Emphasis added)

After Marshall participated in large-scale maneuvers and exercises in 1913 while serving as J. Franklin Bell's aide, Bell commended his performance by writing that Marshall was "the greatest potential wartime leader in the army."

In 1916, Lieutenant Colonel Johnson Hagood completed a written evaluation of Marshall's performance in which he called Marshall a military genius. Responding to the question of whether he would want his subordinate Marshall to serve under him again, Hagood wrote "Yes, but I would prefer to serve under his command." (Emphasis added) Hagood went on to recommend Marshall's immediate promotion to brigadier general, despite the fact that there were more than 1,800 officers, including Hagood, who were senior to him.

After the surrender of the Nazi German government in May 1945, Henry L. Stimson, the Secretary of War, paid tribute to Marshall in front of a gathering of members of the Army staff, concluding with: "I have seen a great many soldiers in my lifetime and you, Sir, are the finest soldier I have ever known."

Historians credit the high regard others had for Marshall's personal integrity as another reason for his positive legacy. In addition to his willingness to confront Pershing over Pershing's berating of the 1st Division chief of staff during World War I, Marshall cited other instances where he provided persistent advice that kept Pershing from creating needless controversy. In one, Marshall recalled a time when Pershing and James Harbord intended to change a War Department policy implemented by Peyton March, the chief of staff of the Army and Pershing's nominal superior, with whom Pershing had a long-running feud. Marshall counseled against it several times, and Pershing angrily indicated that his chief of staff Harbord and he intended to submit their proposal despite Marshall's advice. Rather than concede, Marshall replied that Pershing was letting his personal feud with March cloud his judgment and that Harbord, who also disliked March, was doing the same. Instead of continuing to "pull rank", Pershing yielded to Marshall's judgment and said "Well, have it your own way."

In another incident that highlighted Marshall's reputation for integrity, when President Franklin Roosevelt, a former Assistant Secretary of the Navy, favored the Navy during World War II planning, Marshall suggested that Roosevelt stop referring to the Navy as "us" and the Army as "them." Roosevelt laughed, but Marshall's humorous protest had made its point.

In addition to his military success, Marshall is primarily remembered as the driving force behind the Marshall Plan, which provided billions of dollars in aid to post war Europe to restart the economies of the destroyed countries. In recent years, the cooperation required between former European adversaries as part of the Marshall Plan has been recognized as one of the earliest factors that led to European integration beginning with the formation of the European Coal and Steel Community, and eventually the formation of the European Union.

In a television interview after leaving office, Truman was asked which American he thought had made the greatest contribution of the preceding thirty years. Without hesitation, Truman picked Marshall, adding "I don't think in this age in which I have lived, that there has been a man who has been a greater administrator; a man with a knowledge of military affairs equal to General Marshall."

Orson Welles said in a 1970 interview with Dick Cavett that "Marshall is the greatest man I ever met ... I think he was the greatest human being who was also a great man ... He was a tremendous gentleman: an old fashioned institution which isn't with us anymore." The story Welles related to Cavett to illustrate his point was about a time he saw Marshall take the time to speak with a young American soldier who had accidentally entered the same room. The young man was starstruck to have accidentally stumbled upon Marshall, yet Marshall still patiently and politely engaged the soldier in conversation.

=== Tributes and memorials ===
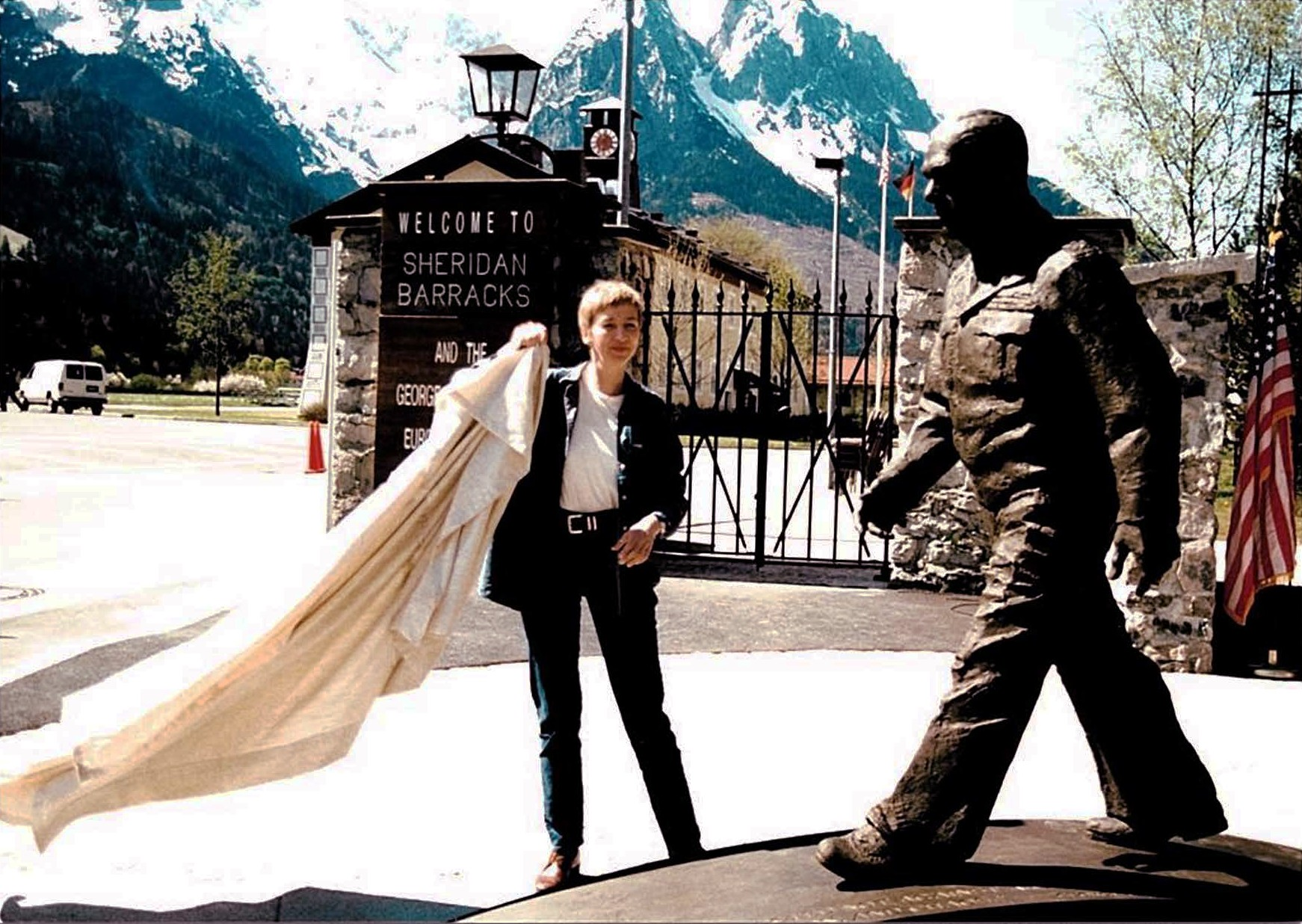
A statue of General Marshall is unveiled at the George C. Marshall European Center for Security Studies on 30 April 1998.

Two non-profit organizations, the George C. Marshall Foundation and the George C. Marshall International Center, actively propagate General Marshall's legacy. The Marshall Foundation oversees Marshall's official papers and over two million other documents relating to the 20th century. The International Center preserves Marshall's home, Dodona Manor, as a museum and hosts educational programs focusing on Marshall's life, leadership, and role in American history.

Numerous streets are named for General Marshall, including George-Marshall-Straße in Wiesbaden, Germany and George-C.-Marshall-Ring in Oberursel, Germany.

On 30 April 1998, the George C. Marshall European Center for Security Studies unveiled the first public statue of General Marshall in Europe in Garmisch-Partenkirchen, Germany. The slightly larger-than-life statue was sponsored by the Marshall Center, the Friends of the Marshall Center and the City of Garmisch-Partenkirchen. It shows Marshall in uniform walking across a bronze bridge, facing east, to greet new friends and allies and was designed by artist Christiane Horn of Wartenberg, Bavaria. Vernon A. Walters, former U.S. ambassador to Germany, was a keynote speaker during the dedication ceremony.

In 1962, the George C. Marshall Junior High School (now George C. Marshall Middle School) was completed and opened in Beaumont, Texas.

== In film and fiction ==
Marshall has been played in film and television by:

- Keith Andes in the 1970 film Tora! Tora! Tora!
- Ward Costello in the 1977 film MacArthur.
- Dana Andrews in the 1979 film Ike, The War Years.
- Bill Morey in the 1980 television film Enola Gay: The Men, the Mission, the Atomic Bomb.
- Tom Danaher in the 1987 film Empire of the Sun
- Norman Burton in the 1988 miniseries War and Remembrance.
- Hal Holbrook in the 1989 television film Day One.
- Harris Yulin in the 1995 television movie Truman.
- Harve Presnell in the 1998 film Saving Private Ryan.
- Scott Wilson in the 2001 film Pearl Harbor.
- Donald Eugene McCoy in the 2009 Chinese movie The Founding of a Republic.
- Will Roberts in the 2023 film Oppenheimer.

== Dates of rank ==
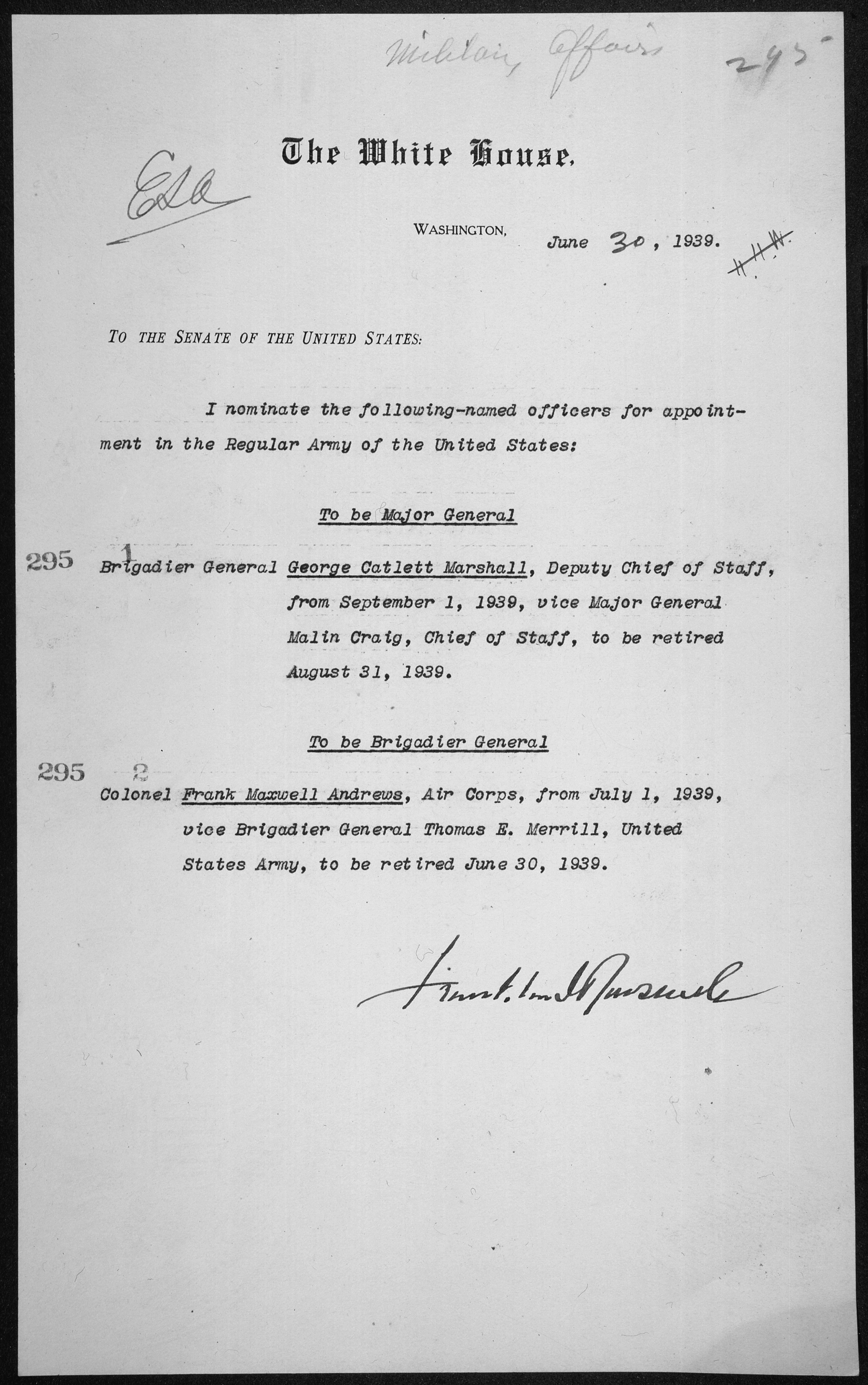
President Roosevelt's nomination of General Marshall to be Major General. 30 June 1939

Marshall's dates of rank were:

Insignia	Rank	Component	Date
No pin insignia in 1902	Second lieutenant	United States Army	2 February 1901 (Appointment accepted 2 February 1902)
	First lieutenant	United States Army	7 March 1907
	Captain	United States Army	1 July 1916
	Major	National Army	5 August 1917
	Lieutenant colonel	National Army	5 January 1918
	Colonel	National Army	27 August 1918
	Captain	Regular Army	30 June 1920 (Reverted to permanent rank)
	Major	Regular Army	1 July 1920
	Lieutenant colonel	Regular Army	21 August 1923
	Colonel	Regular Army	1 September 1933
	Brigadier general	Regular Army	1 October 1936
	Major general	Regular Army	1 September 1939
	General	Army of the United States	1 September 1939
	General of the Army	Army of the United States	16 December 1944
	General of the Army	Regular Army	11 April 1946

Note – Marshall served as Secretary of State from 21 January 1947 to 20 January 1949. He retired from the Army on 28 February 1947 and returned to active duty on 1 March 1949.

== Awards and decorations ==
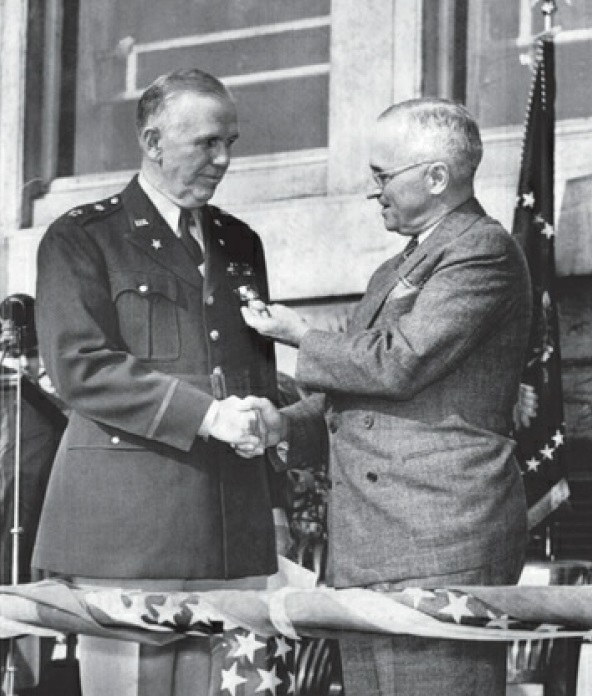
President Harry S. Truman awarding General Marshall an Oak Leaf Cluster to his Distinguished Service Medal on 26 November 1945

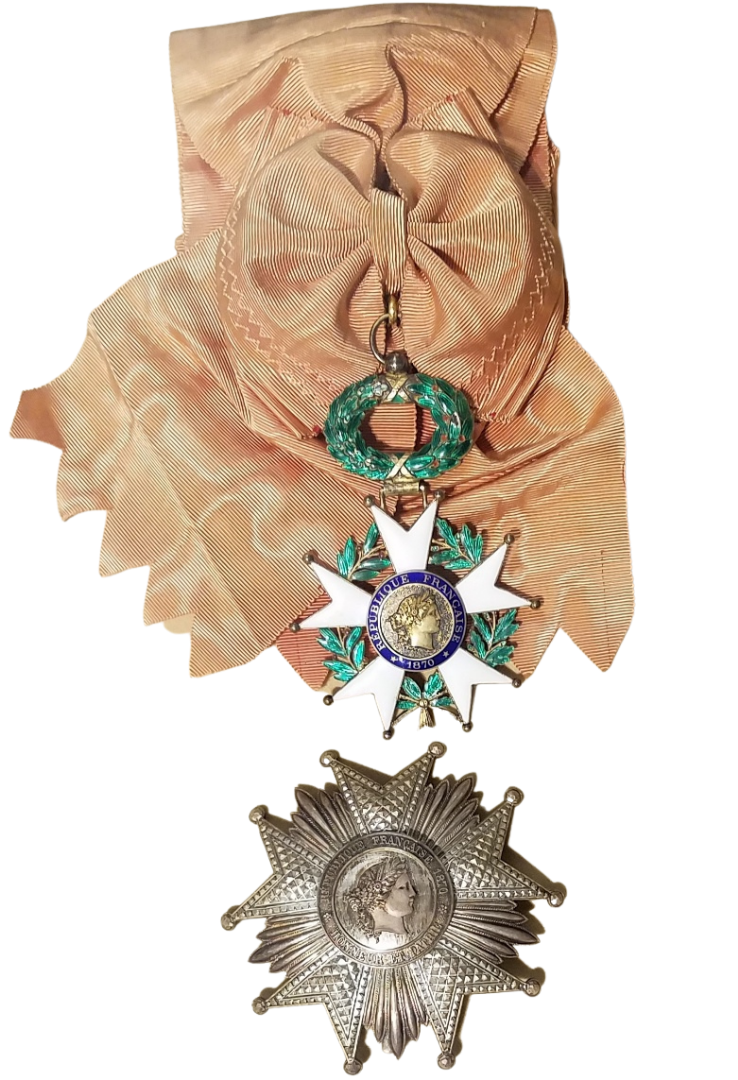
General Marshall's Grand Cross of the Legion of Honour (France)

U.S. Military Decorations
	Army Distinguished Service Medal with one Oak Leaf Cluster
	Silver Star
Former U.S. Army Marksmanship Badge for rifle.	Expert Rifleman Badge
U.S. Service Medals
	Philippine Campaign Medal
Mexican Border Service Medal	Mexican Border Service Medal
	World War I Victory Medal with five campaign clasps
	Army of Occupation of Germany Medal
	American Defense Service Medal with Foreign Service Clasp
	American Campaign Medal (First recipient)
Asiatic-Pacific Campaign Medal	Asiatic-Pacific Campaign Medal
	European-African-Middle Eastern Campaign Medal with two bronze service stars
	World War II Victory Medal
	National Defense Service Medal
Overseas Service Chevrons	Four Overseas Chevrons (for service in World War I)
Army Overseas Service Bar	One Overseas Service Bar
Foreign Orders
	Honorary Knight Grand Cross of the Order of the Bath (United Kingdom)
	Grand Cross of the Legion of Honour (France)
	Order of Blue Sky and White Sun (Republic of China)
	Grand Cross of the Order of Military Merit (Brazil)
	Grand Cross of the Order of Merit (Chile)
	Grand Cross of the Order of Boyacá Cherifien (Colombia)
	Member 1st Class of the Order of Abdon Calderon (Ecuador)
	Knight Grand Cross with swords of the Order of George I (Greece)
	Knight Grand Cross of the Order of Saints Maurice and Lazarus (Italy)
	Knight Grand Cross of the Order of the Crown of Italy (Italy)
	Grand Cross of the Order of Ouissam Alaouite (Morocco)
	Knight Grand Cross with swords of the Order of Orange-Nassau (Netherlands)
	Grand Officer of the Order of the Sun (Peru)
	Order of Suvorov First Class (Union of Soviet Socialist Republics)
	Order of Military Merit (Cuba)
Foreign Decorations and Medals
	Croix de Guerre 1914–1918 with bronze palm (France)
	Medal for the Centennial of the Republic of Liberia (Liberia)
	Silver Medal for Bravery (Montenegro)
	Medal of Solidarity, 2nd Class (Panama)
Ribbon – QE II Coronation Medal	Queen Elizabeth II Coronation Medal (United Kingdom)
	Fourragère in the colors of the Croix de Guerre (France)

=== Civilian honors ===
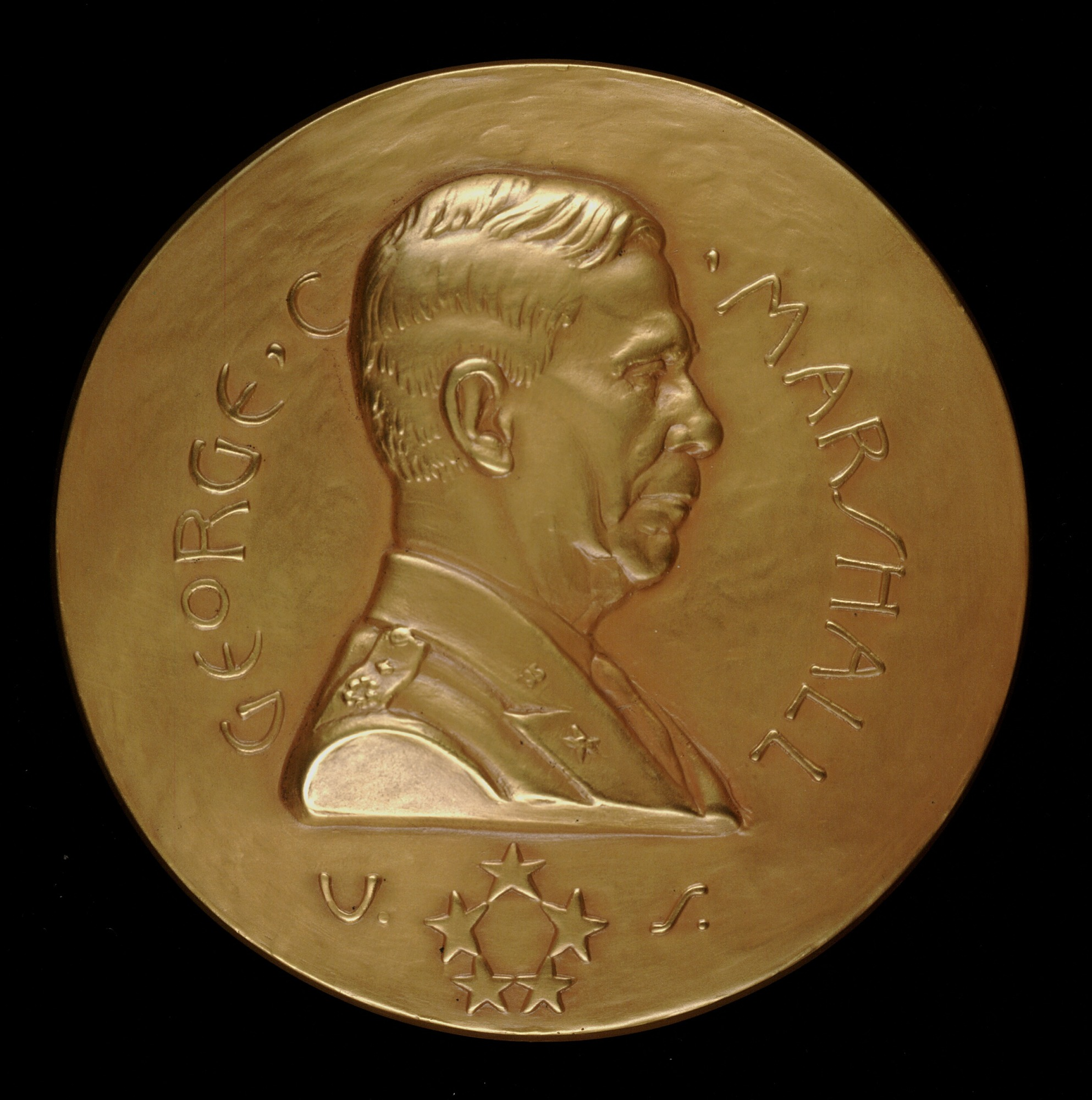
General Marshall's Congressional Gold Medal. Designed by Anthony de Francisci in 1946.

Date	Awarding organization	Award
1939	Society of the Cincinnati	Honorary Membership
1943	American Legion	Distinguished Service Medal
1943	Time magazine	Man of the Year
1944	Pennsylvania Society	Gold Medal for Distinguished Achievement
1945	Reserve Officers Association	Permanent Membership
1945	Theodore Roosevelt Association	Distinguished Service Medal of Honor
1946	United States Congress	Congressional Gold Medal
1946	American Philosophical Society	Resident Member
1947	Freedom House	Freedom Award
1947	Time magazine	Man of the Year
1948	Grand Lodge of New York	Distinguished Achievement Award
1948	Kappa Alpha Order	Award for Distinguished Achievement
1948	Variety Clubs International	International Humanitarian Award
1949	American Planning Association	Gold Medal
1949	New Orleans, Louisiana	Key to the City
1949	San Juan, Puerto Rico	Key to the City
1949	Fraternal Order of Eagles	National Civic Service Award
1949	New York Board of Trade	Award for distinguished service and contribution to the American way
1949	U.S. Conference of Mayors	Award for Distinguished Public Service
1950	Franklin Institute	Honorary Membership
1950	Youngstown, Ohio	Key to the City
1950	Disabled American Veterans, New York Chapter	Citizenship Award
1951	Commonwealth of Virginia	Virginia Distinguished Service Medal
1952	Four Freedoms Fund	Four Freedoms Fund Award
1953	Norwegian Nobel Committee	Nobel Peace Prize
1954	American Veterans	10th Anniversary Award
1956	Woodrow Wilson Foundation	Award for Distinguished Service
1957	Organization for European Economic Cooperation	Silver Medal
1957	Commonwealth of Pennsylvania	Meritorious Medal
1959	Aachen, Germany	Charlemagne Prize
1959	Virginia Military Institute	New Market Medal

== Honorary degrees ==
Honorary degrees
Location	Date	School	Degree	Gave Commencement Address
Kansas	1934	Command and General Staff College	Doctor of Philosophy (Ph.D.)	
Pennsylvania	1939	Washington and Jefferson College	Doctor of Science (Sd.D)	
Pennsylvania	1940	Pennsylvania Military College	Doctor of Military Science (DScMil)	
Virginia	1941	College of William and Mary	Doctor of Laws (LL.D.)	Yes
Connecticut	15 June 1941	Trinity College	Doctor of Laws (LL.D.)	Yes
Vermont	1942	Norwich University	Doctor of Military Science (DScMil)	
New York	1947	Columbia University	Doctor of Laws (LL.D.)	
New Jersey	22 February 1947	Princeton University	Doctor of Laws (LL.D.)	Yes
Massachusetts	6 June 1947	Harvard University	Doctor of Laws (LL.D.)	
Massachusetts	16 June 1947	Amherst College	Doctor of Laws (LL.D.)	Yes
Rhode Island	16 June 1947	Brown University	Doctor of Laws (LL.D.)	Yes
Quebec	1947	McGill University	Doctor of Laws (LL.D.)	
Pennsylvania	1947	Lafayette College	Doctor of Laws (LL.D.)	
California	1947	University of California, Berkeley	Doctor of Laws (LL.D.)	
United Kingdom	1947	University of London	Doctor of Laws (LL.D.)	
United Kingdom	11 November 1947	University of Oxford	Doctor of Civil Law (DCL)	

== See also ==
- German Marshall Fund
- George C. Marshall European Center for Security Studies
- George C. Marshall Foundation
- USS George C. Marshall (SSBN-654)
- Marshall Scholarship
- George C. Marshall's Dodona Manor
- George C. Marshall High School
- George C. Marshall Space Flight Center

== Works cited ==
=== Books ===
- Ambrose, Stephen E. (1997). Citizen Soldiers: The U.S. Army From the Normandy Beaches to the Bulge to the Surrender of Germany. New York: Simon & Schuster. ISBN 0-684-81525-7.
- Behrman, Greg (2007). The Most Noble Adventure: The Marshall Plan and the Time When America Helped Save Europe. New York: Free Press: Simon & Schuster. ISBN 978-0-7432-8263-5. Archived from the original on 12 September 2021 – via Google Books.
- Beisner, Robert L. (2009). Dean Acheson : a Life in the Cold War. Oxford University Press, Inc. ISBN 978-0-19-970012-7. OCLC 1035517800.
- Bland, Larry I.; Stevens, Sharon Ritenour; Wunderlin Jr., Clarence E., eds. (1981), "Letter to Charles J. Graham, September 23, 1941 [Washington, D.C.]", The Papers of George Catlett Marshall, Lexington, Va.: The George C. Marshall Foundation. Electronic version based on The Papers of George Catlett Marshall, vol. 2, "We Cannot Delay," 1 July 1939 – 6 December 1941 (Baltimore and London: The Johns Hopkins University Press, 1986), p. 616 [Pentagon Office, Selected Correspondence, Box 69, Folder 18. Holding ID: 2-553].
- Brooks, David (2015). The Road to Character. New York, NY: Random House. ISBN 978-0-8129-9325-7.
- Buell, Thomas B.; John H. Bradley. The Second World War: Europe and the Mediterranean.
- Campbell, James (2008). The Ghost Mountain Boys: Their Epic March and the Terrifying Battle for New Guinea – The Forgotten War of the South Pacific. Three Rivers Press. ISBN 978-0-307-33597-5.
- Clausen, Henry (2001). Pearl Harbor: Final Judgement. Da Capo Press. ISBN 0306810352.
- Cleaver, Thomas (2019). Holding the Line: The Naval Air Campaign In Korea. Bloomsbury Publishing. ISBN 978-1472831699.
- Cray, Ed (1990). General of the Army: George C. Marshall, Soldier and Statesman. New York: Cooper Square Press. ISBN 978-1-4616-6099-6. Archived from the original on 7 June 2021 – via Google Books.
- Davenport, Matthew J. (2015). First Over There. New York: St. Martins. ISBN 978-1-2500-5644-3.
- Del Testa, David W.; Lemoine, Florence; Strickland, John (2001). Government Leaders, Military Rulers, and Political Activists.
- Farinacci, Donald J. (2010). Truman and MacArthur: Adversaries for a Common Cause. Bennington, VT: Merriam Press. ISBN 978-0-557-40902-0. Archived from the original on 27 December 2019.
- George, John B. (Lt. Col) (1981). Shots Fired In Anger: A Rifleman's View of the War in the Pacific, 1942–1945, Including the Campaign on Guadalcanal and Fighting with Merrill's Marauders in the Jungles of Burma. National Rifle Association Press. ISBN 0-935998-42-X.
- Glenn, Justin (2014). The Washingtons: A Family History. Vol. 5 (Part One). El Dorado, CA: Savas Publishing. ISBN 978-1-940669-30-4. Archived from the original on 24 April 2017.
- Gouda, Frances (2002). American visions of the Netherlands East Indies/Indonesia : US foreign policy and Indonesian nationalism, 1920-1949. Thijs Brocades Zaalberg. Amsterdam: Amsterdam University Press. ISBN 1-4175-2156-2. OCLC 55842798.
- Hanford, William B. (2008). A Dangerous Assignment: An Artillery Forward Observer in World War II. Stackpole Books. ISBN 978-0-8117-3485-1.
- Henry, Mark R. (2001). The US Army in World War II: Northwest Europe. Osprey Publishing. ISBN 978-1-84176-086-5.
- Higginbotham, Don (1985). George Washington and the American Military Tradition. Athens, GA: University of Georgia Press. ISBN 978-0-8203-2400-5. Archived from the original on 27 December 2019.
- Jeffers, H. Paul; Axelrod, Alan (2010). Marshall: Lessons in Leadership. New York: St. Martin's Press. ISBN 978-0-230-11425-8. Archived from the original on 24 April 2017.
- Keast, William R. (Maj) (1945). Provision of Enlisted Replacements (Army Ground Forces Study No. 7). Washington, D.C.: Historical Section – Headquarters Army Ground Forces. Archived from the original on 11 February 2021.
- Lengel, Edward G. (2008). To Conquer Hell. New York: Henry Holt. ISBN 978-0-8050-7931-9.
- Lewis, Adrian (2012). The American Culture of War: The History of US Military Force from World War II to Operation Enduring Freedon. Routledge. ISBN 978-0415890199.
- Marshall, George C. (George Catlett), 1880-1959 (2013). The papers of George Catlett Marshall. Baltimore, Maryland: Johns Hopkins University Press. ISBN 978-0-8018-2552-1. OCLC 7836073.
- Marshall, George C. (1976). Memoirs of My Services in the World War, 1917–1918. New York: Houghton Mifflin. ISBN 978-0-395-20725-3. Archived from the original on 6 May 2021.
- Marshall, Katherine Tupper (1946). Together: Annals of an Army Wife. New York: Tupper and Love.
- McCullough, David (1992a). Truman. New York: Simon and Schuster. ISBN 0-671-86920-5.
- Mossman, B. C.; Stark, M. W. (1991). The Last Salute: Civil and Military Funerals, 1921-1969. Washington, DC: Center for Military, United States Army. Archived from the original on 17 September 2018.
- Pearlman, Michael David (2008). Truman & MacArthur: Policy, Politics, and the Hunger for Honor and Renown. Bloomington: Indiana University Press. ISBN 978-0-2533-5066-4. Archived from the original on 12 September 2021 – via Google Books.
- Pops, Gerald M. (2009). Ethical Leadership in Turbulent Times: Modeling the Public Career of George. Lanham, MD: Rowman & Littlefield. ISBN 978-0739124772. Archived from the original on 28 December 2019.
- Puryear, Edgar F. Jr. (2000). American Generalship: Character Is Everything: The Art of Command. New York: Random House. ISBN 978-0-89141-770-5. Archived from the original on 26 December 2019.
- Roberts, Andrew (2008). Masters and Commanders. How Roosevelt, Churchill, Marshall and Alanbrooke won the war in the west. Allen Lane. ISBN 978-0-7139-9969-3.
- Runkle, Benjamin (2019). Generals in the Making: How Marshall, Eisenhower, Patton, and Their Peers Became the Commanders Who Won World War II. Lanham, MD: Rowman & Littlefield. ISBN 978-0-8117-6849-8. Archived from the original on 14 June 2021 – via Google Books.
- Santoro, Mary Catherine (1999). First Lady of the Army: The Life and Times of Katherine Tupper Marshall. Roanoke, Virginia: Hollins University.
- Siegbahn, K. M. G. (1954). Les Prix Nobel en 1953. Stockholm: Imprimerie Royale P.A. Norstedt & Sons.
- Skutt, Mary Sutton (1997). Growing Up, by George!: George C. Marshall's Early Years, Uniontown, Pennsylvania-Lexington, Virginia, 1880-1901. Lexington, VA: M. S. Scutt. ISBN 978-0-9661-5820-5. Archived from the original on 20 May 2021 – via Google Books.
- Sobel, Robert; Sicilia, David B. (13 March 2003). The United States Executive Branch: M–Z. Greenwood Press. ISBN 978-0313325946. Archived from the original on 12 September 2021 – via Google Books.
- Stevens, Sharon Ritenour; Williams, Alice Trump (2009). Images of America: Lexington. Charleston, SC: Arcadia Publishing. ISBN 978-0-7385-6818-8. Archived from the original on 24 April 2017.
- Stoler, Mark (1989). George C. Marshall: Soldier-Statesman of the American Century. Woodbridge, CT: Twayne Publishers. ISBN 978-0-8057-7768-0 – via Internet Archive.
- The Adjutant General's Office (1947). Official Army Register. Vol. I. Washington, DC: U.S. Government Printing Office – via Internet Archive.
- Tsou, Tang (1963). America's Failure in China, 1941–50. [Chicago] University of Chicago Press.
- Tucker, Spencer C. (2011). The Encyclopedia of the Vietnam War: A Political, Social, and Military History. ABC-CLIO. ISBN 978-1-85109-961-0. Archived from the original on 18 May 2020.
- Tucker, Spencer; Roberts, Priscilla Mary (2006). World War I: A Student Encyclopedia. Vol. I, A–D. Santa Barbara, CA: ABC-CLIO. ISBN 978-1-85109-879-8. Archived from the original on 24 December 2019.
- Turtledove, Harry (2016). Fallout : the Hot War. Random House Publishing. ISBN 978-0-553-39073-5. OCLC 945169989.
- Turtledove, Harry (2015). Joe Steele. Recorded Books. ISBN 978-1-4906-4254-3. OCLC 966533957.
- Turtledove, Harry (1997) [1996]. Worldwar. New English Library. ISBN 0-340-68491-7. OCLC 41157084.
- Uldrich, Jack (2005). Soldier, Statesman, Peacemaker: Leadership Lessons from George C. Marshall. AMACOM Books. ISBN 978-0814415962. "Marshall even went to great lengths to prevent himself from falling prey to the allures of power. He had always refused to vote because he subscribed to the belief that a professional soldier should remain above politics, but he took other steps to insulate himself from the corrupting influence of power once he became chief of staff."
- Unger, Debi; Unger, Irwin; Hirshson, Stanley P. (2014). George Marshall : A Biography. New York, NY: Harper. ISBN 978-0060577193. OCLC 892858663.
- "Fully the Equal of the Best": George C. Marshall and the Virginia Military Institute (PDF). Lexington, Virginia: George C. Marshall Foundation. 1996. Archived (PDF) from the original on 1 September 2021.
- Willbanks, James H., ed. (2013). Generals of the Army: Marshall, MacArthur, Eisenhower, Arnold, Bradley. Lexington: University Press of Kentucky. ISBN 978-0-8131-4212-8. Archived from the original on 12 September 2021 – via Google Books.
- Taylor, William A., ed. (2020). George C. Marshall and the Early Cold War: Policy, Politics, and Society. Norman: University of Oklahoma Press. ISBN 978-0-8061-6765-7. Archived from the original on 12 September 2021 – via Google Books.
- George Catlett Marshall: A Chronology (PDF). Lexington, VA: George C. Marshall Foundation. 2014. Archived from the original (PDF) on 1 September 2021.
- Zabecki, David T.; Mastriano, Douglas V., eds. (2020). Pershing's Lieutenants: American Military Leadership in World War I. New York: Osprey Publishing. ISBN 978-1-4728-3861-2. Archived from the original on 13 May 2021 – via Google Books.

=== Periodicals ===
- Bland, Larry I. (31 July 2020) [1988]. "George C. Marshall and the education of Army leaders" (PDF). Military Review. 68. Archived from the original (PDF) on 31 July 2020.
- Brecher, Frank W. (2012). "US Secretary of State George C. Marshall's Losing Battles against President Harry S. Truman's Palestine Policy, January–June 1948". Middle Eastern Studies. 48 (2): 687. doi:10.1080/00263206.2012.687252. S2CID 220377505.
- "Christian Herald". Christian Herald. Vol. 96. Chappaqua, NY: Christian Herald Association. 1973. Archived from the original on 12 September 2021 – via Google Books.
- Jolemore, Kenneth A. (July 1986). "The Mentor: More than a Teacher, More Than A Coach". Military Review. Ft. Leavenworth, KS: U.S. Army Command and General Staff College. p. 6. Archived from the original on 13 May 2021 – via Google Books.
- Liebling, A. J. (18 October 1940). "Profiles: Chief of Staff". The New Yorker. New York, NY: Condé Nast. Archived from the original on 21 February 2021.
- Mullins, Richard J. (1 January 2017). "The General's Goiter: The Outcome of a Subtotal Thyroidectomy Performed on United States Army General George Catlett Marshall". Journal of the American College of Surgeons. New York, NY: American College of Surgeons. p. 79. Archived from the original on 12 September 2021.
- Ossad, Steven L. (March 2003). "Command Failures: Lessons Learned from Lloyd R. Fredendall". Army Magazine.
- Parmelee, H. C. (15 August 1918). "Personal: Mr. Stuart B. Marshall". Chemical & Metallurgical Engineering. Vol. XIX. New York, NY: McGraw-Hill Company. p. 214. Archived from the original on 24 April 2017.
- Plampin, William (1 September 1963). "Army Medals and Decorations". Army Information Digest. Washington, DC: Department of the Army. p. xiv – via Google Books.

=== News & Media ===
- "1947 Brown University Graduation Featuring Secretary of State George C Marshall". YouTube. 25 January 2021. Archived from the original on 24 June 2021.
- "70 years ago, a Harvard Commencement speech outlined the Marshall Plan, and calmed a continent". Harvard Gazette. 22 May 2017. Archived from the original on 24 June 2021.
- "A Greenburg Resident: General Marshall's Sister Dies at 85". Pittsburgh Press. Pittsburgh, PA. 12 June 1962. p. 22. Archived from the original on 24 April 2017.
- "Biography". www.karlspreis.de. Archived from the original on 11 September 2021.
- Bowers, Tom (15 June 2021). "Three Scotches Aboard at Amherst". George C. Marshall Foundation. Archived from the original on 24 June 2021.
- "Building on a Mission of Remembrance: Marshall and the American Battle Monuments Commission". YouTube. 27 July 2019. Archived from the original on 19 May 2021.
- Calhoun, Mark T. (2012). "General Lesley J. McNair: Little-Known Architect of the U.S. Army" (PDF). kuscholarworks.ku.edu/. Lawrence, KS: University of Kansas. p. 43. Archived from the original (PDF) on 9 January 2017.
- "Clifton S. Brown, Stepson of General Marshall, Succumbs". Winchester Evening Star. Winchester, VA. Associated Press. 12 May 1952. p. 3. Archived from the original on 11 September 2021 – via NewspaperArchive.com.
- "Commencement Speakers – Special Collections Research Center Wiki". scdbwiki.swem.wm.edu. Archived from the original on 24 June 2021.
- "The Commission: American Battle Monuments Commission". www.abmc.gov. Archived from the original on 5 February 2018.
- csonnier (13 February 2015). "Marshall & Romance". George C. Marshall Foundation. Archived from the original on 7 May 2021.
- csonnier (29 May 2015). "Marshall And Allen Tupper Brown". George C. Marshall Foundation. Lexington, VA: Marshall Foundation.org. Archived from the original on 27 February 2021.
- "D-Day, A Year Too Late?". U.S. Naval Institute. 1 June 2019. Archived from the original on 26 May 2021.
- "Dedication of Cemetery at Suresnes, France – Library". www.marshallfoundation.org. Archived from the original on 19 May 2021.
- "Def. Sec. George Marshall receives Va. Distinguished Service Medal from Va. Gov. John S. Battle; Marshall Day at VMI, May 15, 1951". George C. Marshall Foundation. Archived from the original on 24 April 2021.
- "Diary entries, 6–7, April 1951, Truman Papers". Harry S. Truman Library and Museum. Archived from the original on 6 June 2011.
- "Distinguished Achievement Award, George C. Marshall". Kappa Alpha Order.org. Archived from the original on 11 September 2021.
- "George C. Marshall: Early Career". georgecmarshall.org. Leesburg, VA: George C. Marshall International Center. Archived from the original on 4 June 2021.
- "Editorial Note on Becoming General Liggett's Aide, February 1915". marshallfoundation.org. George C. Marshall Foundation. Archived from the original on 28 July 2016.
- "Enola Gay: The Men, the Mission, the Atomic Bomb (TV Movie 1980)". IMDb. Archived from the original on 11 September 2021.
- "Five-Star Generals in the U.S. Military". VeteranAid. 19 October 2016. Archived from the original on 20 May 2021.
- "Foreign Relations of the United States, 1950, Korea, Volume VII – Office of the Historian". history.state.gov. Archived from the original on 26 May 2021.
- "Frequently Asked Questions – Five-Star Generals". history.army.mil. Archived from the original on 29 May 2021.
- "Gen. George C. Marshall, Main Architect of World War II Victory, 78, Dies". St. Louis Post-Dispatch. St. Louis, MO. Associated Press. 17 October 1959. p. 1 – via Newspapers.com.
- "Gen. George C. Marshall: Distinguished Service Medal -- The American Legion". www.legion.org. Archived from the original on 11 April 2021.
- "General George C Marshall". general-wedemeyer.com. Archived from the original on 27 March 2016.
- "General George C. Marshall is shown in this photo, at attention and..." Getty Images. 15 March 2016. Archived from the original on 12 May 2021.
- "General of the Army George Catlett Marshall". National Museum of the United States Army. Fort Belvoir, VA: Army Historical Foundation. 22 January 2015. Archived from the original on 15 April 2021.
- "George Marshall". npg.si.edu. Archived from the original on 28 July 2018.
- "George C. Marshall". npg.si.edu. Archived from the original on 10 May 2021.
- "George C. Marshall". npg.si.edu. Archived from the original on 12 May 2021.
- "George C. Marshall – Harry S. Truman Administration". Office of the Secretary of Defense – Historical Office. Archived from the original on 7 February 2017.
- "George C. Marshall's Dodona Manor". George C. Marshall.org. Leesburg, VA: George C. Marshall International Center. Archived from the original on 5 June 2021.
- "George Catlett Marshall, U.S. Army Chief of Staff, Secretary of State". CNN. Archived from the original on 13 November 2007.
- "George Catlett Marshall: Timeline & Chronology". Biography: George C. Marshall. Lexington, VA: The George C. Marshall Foundation. Archived from the original on 4 September 2016.
- "George-C.-Marshall-Ring 61440 Oberursel, Germany". George-C.-Marshall-Ring 61440 Oberursel, Germany. Archived from the original on 12 September 2021.
- "George-Marshall-Straße 65197 Wiesbaden, Germany". George-Marshall-Straße 65197 Wiesbaden, Germany. Archived from the original on 12 September 2021.
- "Gold Medalists". Pennsylvania Society. Archived from the original on 24 April 2021.
- Hambro, Carl Joachim (1953). "Award Ceremony Speech, Nobel Peace Prize, George Marshall". Nobelprize.org. Stockholm, Sweden: The Nobel Foundation. Archived from the original on 22 June 2018.
- Hamilton, Esther (8 March 1950). "General Wares to All; Crowds Line Streets". Youngstown Vindicator. Archived from the original on 2 June 2021.
- "The hardest work I ever did in my life". George C. Marshall Foundation. 11 June 2020. Archived from the original on 18 May 2021.
- "History of the Marshall Plan". marshallfoundation.org. George C. Marshall Foundation. Archived from the original on 29 June 2016.
- "Home". www.georgecmarshall.org. Archived from the original on 16 July 2016.
- "Homenagem á Missão Militar Norte Americana". Correio Paulistano. VASP. 4 June 1939. Archived from the original on 4 April 2017.
- "Ike: The War Years (TV Mini-Series 1979)". IMDb. 3 May 1979. Archived from the original on 9 May 2021.
- "Katherine Boyce Tupper: Wife of a Murder Victim and Wife of a General | Leon J. Podles :: DIALOGUE". www.podles.org. 4 April 2015. Archived from the original on 29 November 2017.
- "Key to New Orleans – Marshall Museum". www.marshallfoundation.org. Archived from the original on 11 May 2021.
- "Key to the City of San Juan, Puerto Rico – Marshall Museum". www.marshallfoundation.org. Archived from the original on 11 May 2021.
- Kozak, Jeffrey (28 October 2016). "Marshall and the Distinguished Service Medal". The George C. Marshall Foundation. Archived from the original on 1 February 2020.
- "The Leadership of George C. Marshall". George C. Marshall.org. Leesburg, VA: George C. Marshall International Center. Archived from the original on 11 September 2021.
- "Letter to the Chairman, Humanitarian Award Dinner of the Variety Clubs International: Harry S. Truman". www.trumanlibrary.gov. Archived from the original on 24 April 2021.
- Lewis, Mark (16 April 2020). "Kitty Winn's Circle". Ojai Hub. Ojai, CA. Archived from the original on 17 January 2021.
- "Marshall and Mattis". George C. Marshall Foundation. 10 February 2017. Archived from the original on 26 May 2021.
- "Marshall Center's Bronze Statue of its Namesake Turns 21". www.marshallcenter.org. Archived from the original on 14 May 2021.
- "Marshall Is Named Head Of Battle Monuments". The New York Times. 6 February 1949. p. 6.
- "The Marshall Plan". georgecmarshall.org.
- "Marshall's Silver Star". Marshall Foundation Blog. Lexington, VA: The George C. Marshall Foundation. 8 February 2020. Archived from the original on 25 February 2021.
- McCullough, David (1992b). "Truman Fires MacArthur". History Net.com. Leesburg, VA: World History Group. Archived from the original on 19 May 2021.
- McKinzie, Richard D. (13 November 1972). "Joseph C. Satterthwaite Oral History Interview". Truman Library. Washington, D.C. Archived from the original on 27 June 2020. "General Marshall could see the President anytime, but being a general he never took advantage of this. In fact, on one occasion, I think it was over Palestine actually, he told the President -- I was told by somebody at the meeting -- "Mr. President, if you take this action I wouldn't vote for you, but of course I don't vote." He as an Army officer never voted apparently in his life."
- Miscamble, Wilson (1 July 2021). "Review of George C. Marshall and the Early Cold War: Policy, Politics, and Society: Taylor, William A.; Stoler, Mark A., eds". H-Net. East Lansing, MI: Department of History, Michigan State University. Archived from the original on 9 July 2021.
- "Mrs. Marshall, Wife of General". The Baltimore Sun. Baltimore, MD. Associated Press. 20 December 1978. p. 12. Archived from the original on 11 September 2021 – via Newspapers.com.
- "Mrs. Walter Coles". Richmond Times-Dispatch. Richmond, VA. 20 October 1929. p. 6. Archived from the original on 11 September 2021 – via Newspapers.com.
- "The Nobel Peace Prize 1953". NobelPrize.org. Archived from the original on 26 September 2019.
- "Office of the Clerk, U.S. House of Representatives". Archived from the original on 23 July 2011.
- "Pearl Harbor (2001)". IMDb. Archived from the original on 21 April 2021.
- Perry, Mark (6 June 2014). "Should D-Day Have Happened a Year Earlier?". POLITICO Magazine. Archived from the original on 26 May 2021.
- Pearson, Richard (20 December 1978). "Katherine Marshall, 96, Dies". The Washington Post. Washington, DC. Archived from the original on 19 May 2017.
- "Person of the Year: A Photo History". Time. 16 December 2006. ISSN 0040-781X. Archived from the original on 24 February 2021.
- Pierson, Frank (9 September 1995). "Truman" (Biography, Drama). Gary Sinise, Diana Scarwid, Richard Dysart, Colm Feore. HBO Films, Spring Creek Productions. Archived from the original on 25 August 2019.
- Pogue, Forrest C. "The Supreme Commander". ibiblio.org. Office of the Chief of Military History. Archived from the original on 20 January 2016.
- "President Truman's Decision to Recognize Israel". Jerusalem Center for Public Affairs. Archived from the original on 6 March 2012.
- "Profile: The Founding of a Republic (2009 film)". cn.hanx.in. 30 September 2009. Archived from the original on 25 June 2021.
- "Queen Elizabeth II Coronation Medal". Marshall Foundation.org. Lexington, VA: George C. Marshall Foundation. 31 May 2017. Archived from the original on 11 September 2021.
- "Recognition of Israel". The Truman Library. Archived from the original on 21 February 2009.
- Runkle, Benjamin (3 October 2017). "When Marshall Met Pershing". War on the Rocks. Washington, DC: Rocks Media, LLC. Archived from the original on 18 February 2021.
- Sargent, Joseph (15 July 1977). "MacArthur" (Biography, Drama, History, War). Gregory Peck, Dan O'Herlihy, Ed Flanders, Ivan Bonar. Universal Pictures. Archived from the original on 1 November 2016.
- Sargent, Joseph (5 March 1989). "Day One" (Drama, History). Brian Dennehy, David Strathairn, Michael Tucker, Hume Cronyn. AT&T, Spelling Entertainment, World International Network (WIN).
- "Saving Private Ryan (1998)". IMDb. Archived from the original on 8 March 2021.
- "Speech at Trinity College, June 15, 1941 – Library". www.marshallfoundation.org. Archived from the original on 24 June 2021.
- Stewart, Greg (13 June 2011). "Made a Mason at Sight". Masonic Education and Analysis. Freemason Information. Archived from the original on 6 February 2015.
- Stoler, Mark (2015). "The Noblest Romans: Winston Churchill and General of the Army George C. Marshall". Winston Churchill.org. Washington, DC: International Churchill Society. Archived from the original on 21 April 2018.
- "Stories of Service: Richard C. Wing". YouTube. 29 April 2015. Archived from the original on 12 September 2021.
- The Dick Cavett Show: Orson Welles on General George Marshall. San Bruno, CA: YouTube. 7 July 1970. Event occurs at 0:11. Archived from the original on 11 December 2021.
- "To David Burpee, March 27, 1942 – Library". www.marshallfoundation.org. Archived from the original on 7 June 2021.
- "Today in Princeton history, 1947: Alumni Day speaker Marshall cites need for U.S. aid, foreshadowing the Marshall Plan". Princeton Alumni Weekly. 22 February 2013. Archived from the original on 24 June 2021.
- "Tora! Tora! Tora! (1970)". IMDb. Archived from the original on 8 December 2016.
- "Truman Adviser Recalls May 14, 1948 US Decision to Recognize Israel". Washington Report on Middle East Affairs. May–June 1991. p. 17. Archived from the original on 27 September 2007.
- "U.S. Senate: Joint Committee on the Investigation of the Pearl Harbor Attack". www.senate.gov. Archived from the original on 18 March 2021.
- Vandergriff, Donald E. (12 September 2003). "Seven Wars and a Century Later, a Failed System". military.com. Archived from the original on 6 December 2008.
- Waddell, Charles L. (21 February 1997). "Senate Joint Resolution No. 410: On the Death of Molly Brown Winn". LIS: Virginia's Legislative Information System. Richmond, VA: Senate of Virginia. p. 1. Archived from the original on 12 September 2021.
- "War and Remembrance (TV Mini-Series 1988–1989)". IMDb. Archived from the original on 16 April 2018.
- Wheeler, Linda (20 February 2015). "Restoration of Marshall House in Leesburg Enters Home Stretch". The Washington Post. Washington, DC. Archived from the original on 22 August 2016.
- "Why is there a rose named for Katherine Marshall?". George C. Marshall Foundation. 6 August 2020. Archived from the original on 4 June 2021.* Zabecki, David T. (22 April 2021). "General Malin Craig: The Man Behind Marshall". HistoryNet. Archived from the original on 8 June 2021.
- Zajac, Frances Borsodi (26 October 2003). "Reporter, historian recalls interviews with General George Marshall". The Herald-Standard. Uniontown, PA. Archived from the original on 22 July 2021.

Military offices
Preceded by Stanley Dunbar Embick	Deputy Chief of Staff of the United States Army; 1938–1939	Succeeded by Lorenzo D. Gasser
Preceded by Malin Craig	Chief of Staff of the United States Army; 1939–1945	Succeeded by Dwight D. Eisenhower
Political offices
Preceded by James F. Byrnes	U.S. Secretary of State; Served under: Harry S. Truman; 1947–1949	Succeeded by Dean Acheson
Preceded by Louis A. Johnson	U.S. Secretary of Defense; Served under: Harry S. Truman; 1950–1951	Succeeded by Robert A. Lovett
Awards and achievements
Preceded by Prince Konoye	Cover of Time Magazine; 29 July 1940	Succeeded by Sir Alan F. Brooke
Preceded by Ed Flynn	Cover of Time Magazine; 19 October 1942	Succeeded by John Vereker, 6th Viscount Gort
Preceded by Patriarch Sergius I of Moscow	Cover of Time Magazine; 3 January 1944	Succeeded by Erich von Manstein
Preceded by Francisco Franco	Cover of Time Magazine; 25 March 1946	Succeeded by Omar Bradley
Preceded by King George II of Greece	Cover of Time Magazine; 10 March 1947	Succeeded by Arnold J. Toynbee
Preceded by "Madonna and Child" by Alesso Baldovinetti	Cover of Time Magazine; 5 January 1948	Succeeded by Gregory Peck
Preceded by Lilli Palmer and Rex Harrison	Cover of Life Magazine; 18 December 1950	Succeeded by Christmas Children Special
