= List of memorials to George C. Marshall =

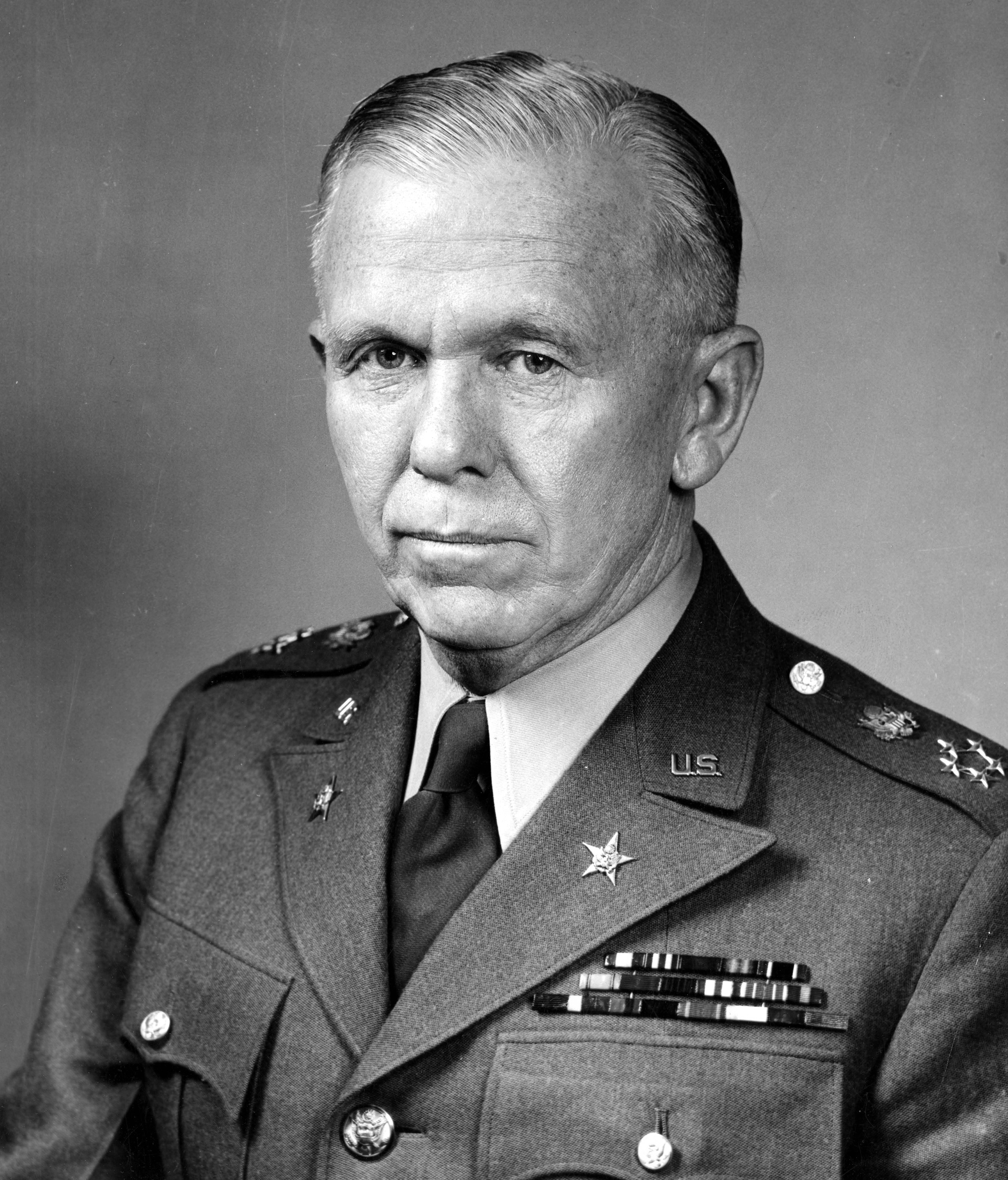
General of the Army George C. Marshall

This is a list of memorials to George C. Marshall (1880–1959), former secretary of state, secretary of defense, and Nobel Peace Prize laureate.

== Education ==
- George C. Marshall High School, founded in 1962 and located in Falls Church, Virginia, is the only public high school in the United States named for Marshall. The nickname of the school – "The Statesmen" – appropriately reflects his life and contributions.
- George C. Marshall Middle School in Beaumont, Texas.
- Marshall Elementary School, in the Laurel Highlands School District, Uniontown, Pennsylvania.
- George C. Marshall Elementary School in Vancouver, Washington.
- George C. Marshall Elementary School in Seaside, California.
- The British Parliament established the Marshall Scholarship in recognition of Marshall's contributions to Anglo-American relations.
- Ankara Elementary/High School in Ankara, Turkey. Opened in 1950, its buildings were dedicated to George C. Marshall in 1964.
- George C. Marshall Lecture Hall inside the Lewis and Clark Center at the Command & General Staff College, Fort Leavenworth, Kansas.
- George C. Marshall Auditorium, built in 1959 inside Bell Hall at the Command & General Staff College.
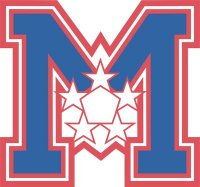
  Logo of George C. Marshall High School in Fairfax County, Virginia

== Parks ==
- Marshall Square, a public park in Uniontown, Pennsylvania featuring a bust and memorial plaques provided by the Lion’s Club. Opened in 1981.
- George C. Marshall Memorial Plaza, a public park near the site of Marshall's boyhood home in Uniontown, Pennsylvania. Opened on October 26, 2003 with Prince Andrew, Duke of York in attendance.
- George C. Marshall Park, a public park in Pinehurst, North Carolina where Marshall owned a home. Dedicated by General Raymond T. Odierno on November 7, 2014.
- Marshall Park, a recreation area with baseball fields, a playground, and garden plots in Vancouver, Washington.
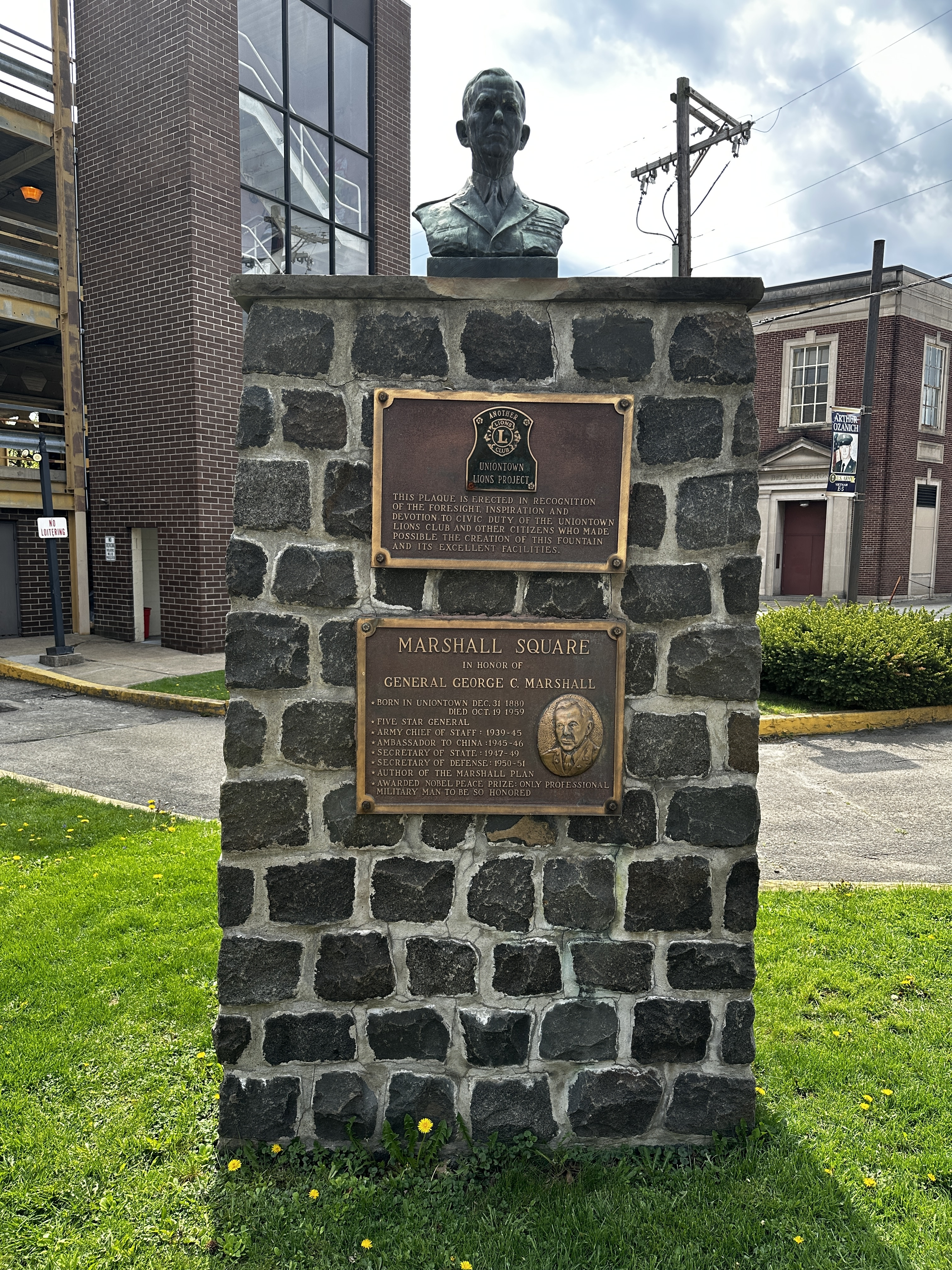
Bust and plaques of General Marshall in Uniontown, Pennsylvania

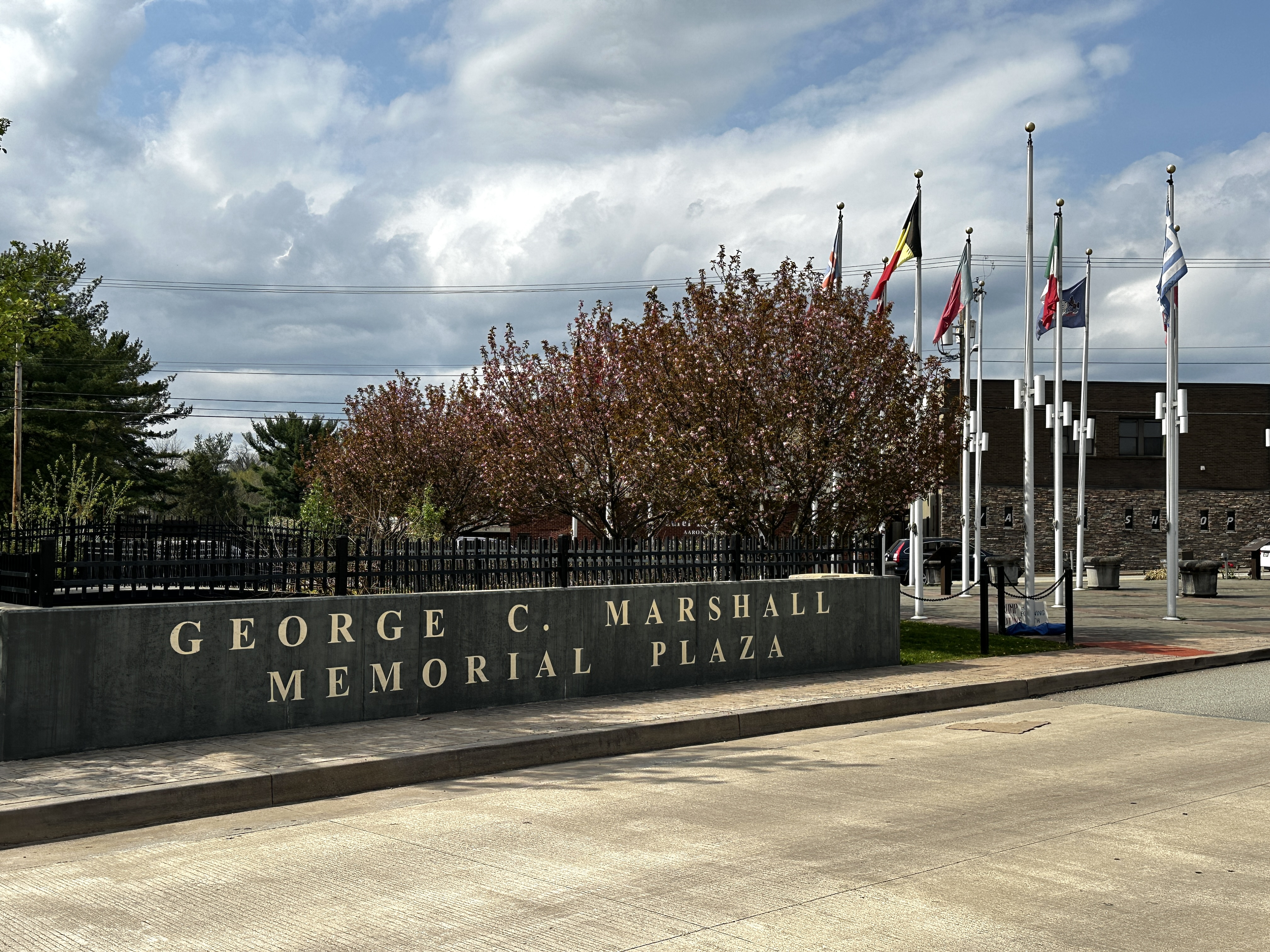
George C. Marshall Memorial Plaza in Uniontown, Pennsylvania

== Military vessels ==
- USS George C. Marshall (SSBN-654), a Benjamin Franklin-class ballistic missile submarine. The only naval vessel named for General Marshall.
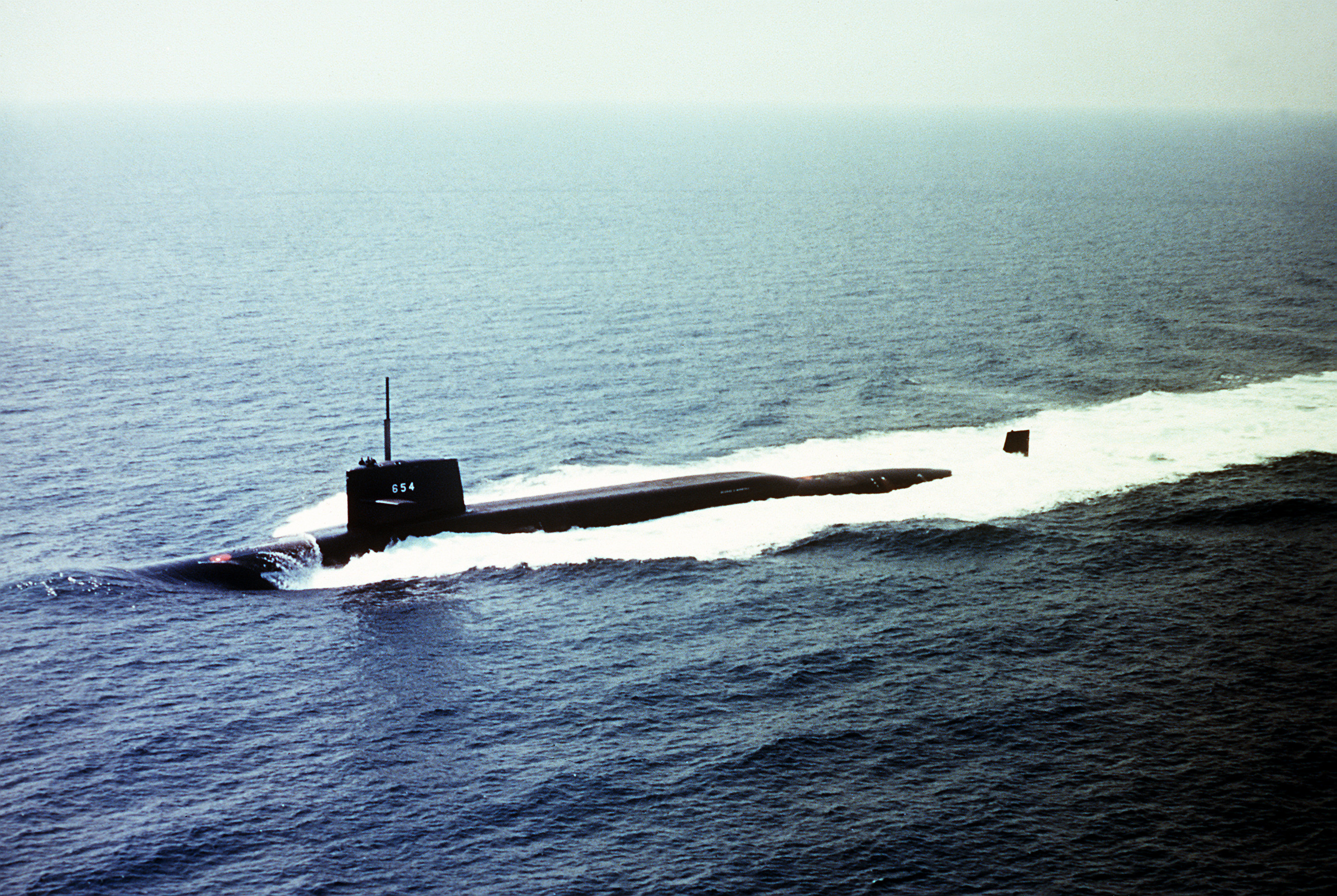
  USS George C. Marshall underway in the Atlantic Ocean. February 1, 1991.

== Monuments ==
- Pennsylvania Historical Marker at the former location of the birthplace of General Marshall. Dedicated January 17, 1981 at 142 West Main Street (U.S. 40) in Uniontown, Pennsylvania.
- Marshall-Brunnen (Marshall Fountain), a public art display memorializing General Marshall. Three bronze water nymphs represent the maidens of Goethe's Faust.
- Marshall statue by Christiane Horn at the George C. Marshall European Center for Security Studies.
- Marshall statue at his former home, Dodona Manor, in Leesburg, Virginia.
- General Marshall Equestrian Statue, a life-size bronze statue, in Uniontown, Pennsylvania. Installed on July 4, 1989.
- Bust of General Marshall at the George C. Marshall Space Flight Center. Unveiled by Dwight D. Eisenhower and Marshall's widow on September 8, 1960.
- Military statue of Marshall by Augusto Bozzano at the Virginia Military Institute in Lexington, Virginia as part of Marshall Plaza. Dedicated on Founders Day, November 11, 1978.
- Seated bronze statue of Marshall inside the George C. Marshall Memorial Plaza in Uniontown, Pennsylvania. Dedicated October 26, 2003.
- Bust of General Marshall in the American Red Cross National Headquarters in Washington, DC. Sculpted by Nison A. Tregor.
- Plaque with remarks from General Marshall's speech announcing the Marshall Plan on June 5, 1947 in Langwasser, Germany.
- Granite monument to General Marshall in Kaisermühlen, Vienna, Austria. Sculpted by Alexander Wahl and dedicated in 1963.
- Bronze plaque honoring General Marshall in Rotterdam City Hall, the Netherlands. Unveiled on May 29, 1997 by President Bill Clinton during celebrations for the 50th anniversary of the Marshall Plan.
- Statue of Secretary of State Marshall at the U.S. Embassy in Athens, Greece. Dedicated in October 2000 by the American Hellenic Educational Progressive Association.
- Plaque dedicated to General Marshall at the National D-Day Memorial in Bedford, Virginia. Erected on November 11, 2004 by the Virginia Military Institute Class of 1943.
- Life-size Marshall statue by Asbjørn Høglund on the Akershus Quay in Oslo, Norway. Dedicated on June 15, 2008 by Norwegian Minister of Foreign Affairs Jonas Gahr Støre.
- "The Sphinx of Arnhem" by artist Marel Smink in Arnhem, Netherlands. This work of art incorporates a 1946 Worthington diesel engine, given as part of the Marshall Plan, topped by a winged bust of General Marshall. It was unveiled on January 29, 2015 near the John Frost Bridge.
- Life-size Marshall statue in Founders Plaza at the National WWII Museum in New Orleans, Louisiana.
- Headstone of George and Katherine Marshall, Elizabeth Carter Coles, and Elizabeth Pendleton Coles at Arlington National Cemetery in Arlington, Virginia.
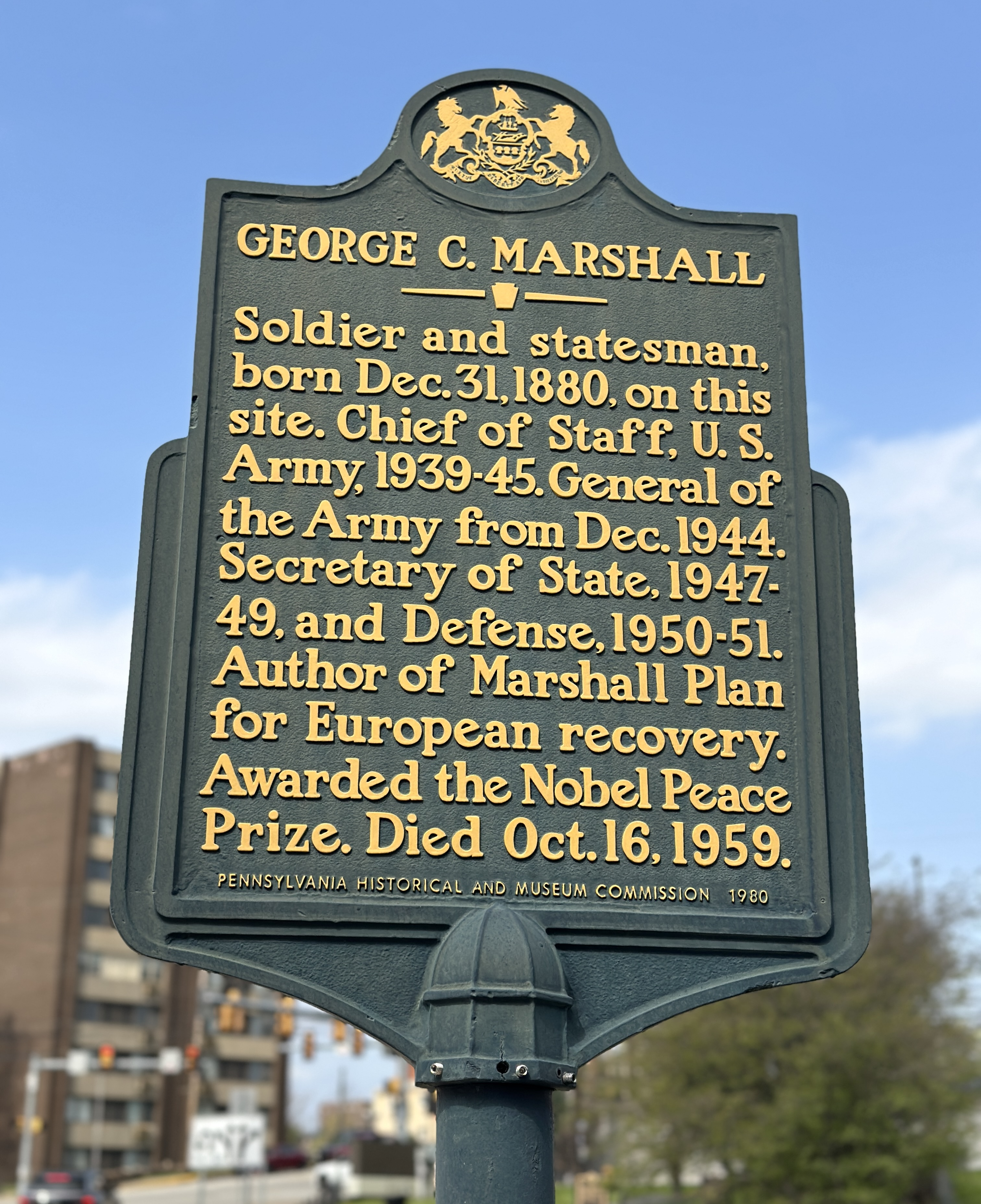
  Pennsylvania Historical Marker for General Marshall in Uniontown, Pennsylvania
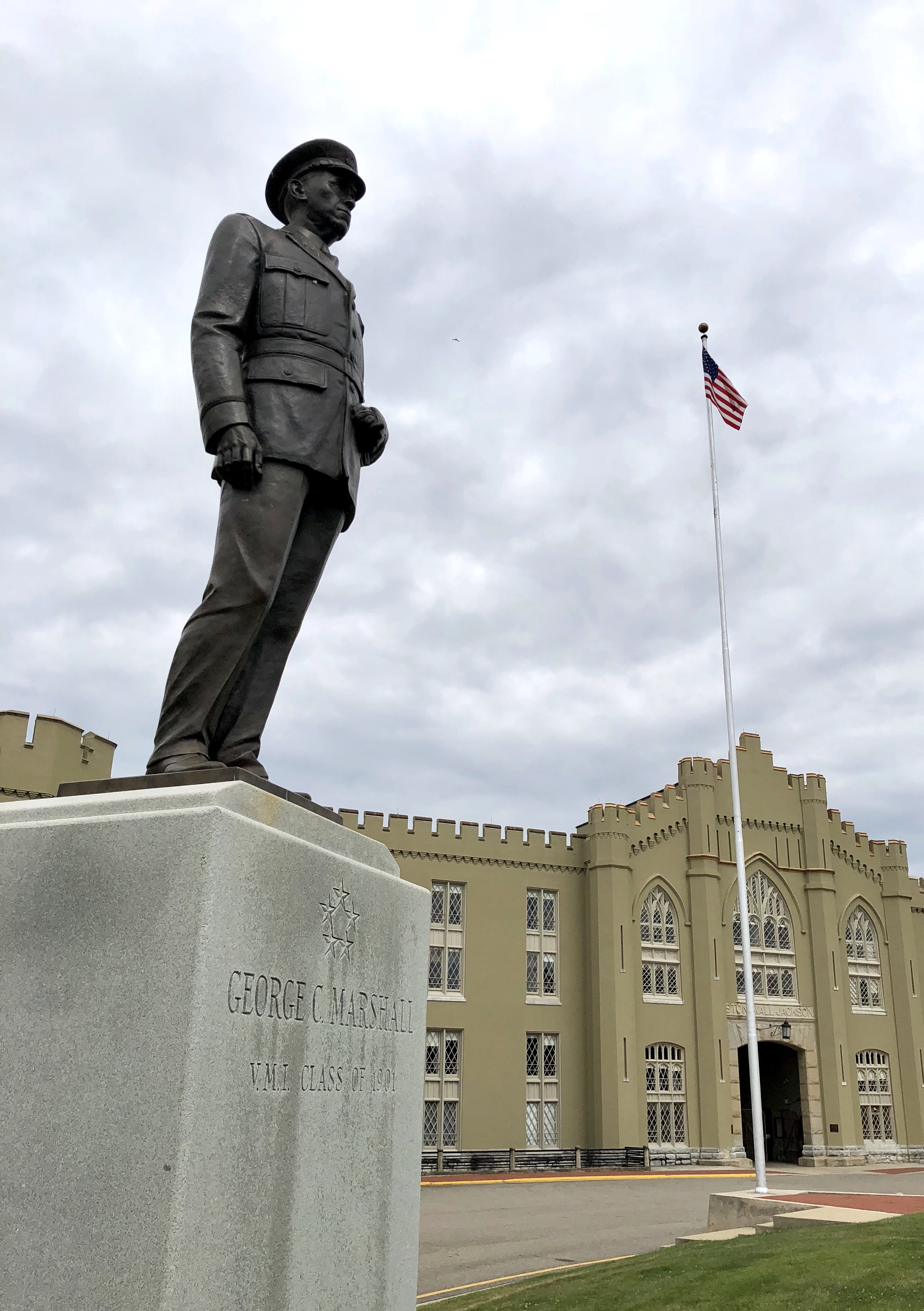
  Bronze statue of General Marshall at the Virginia Military Institute
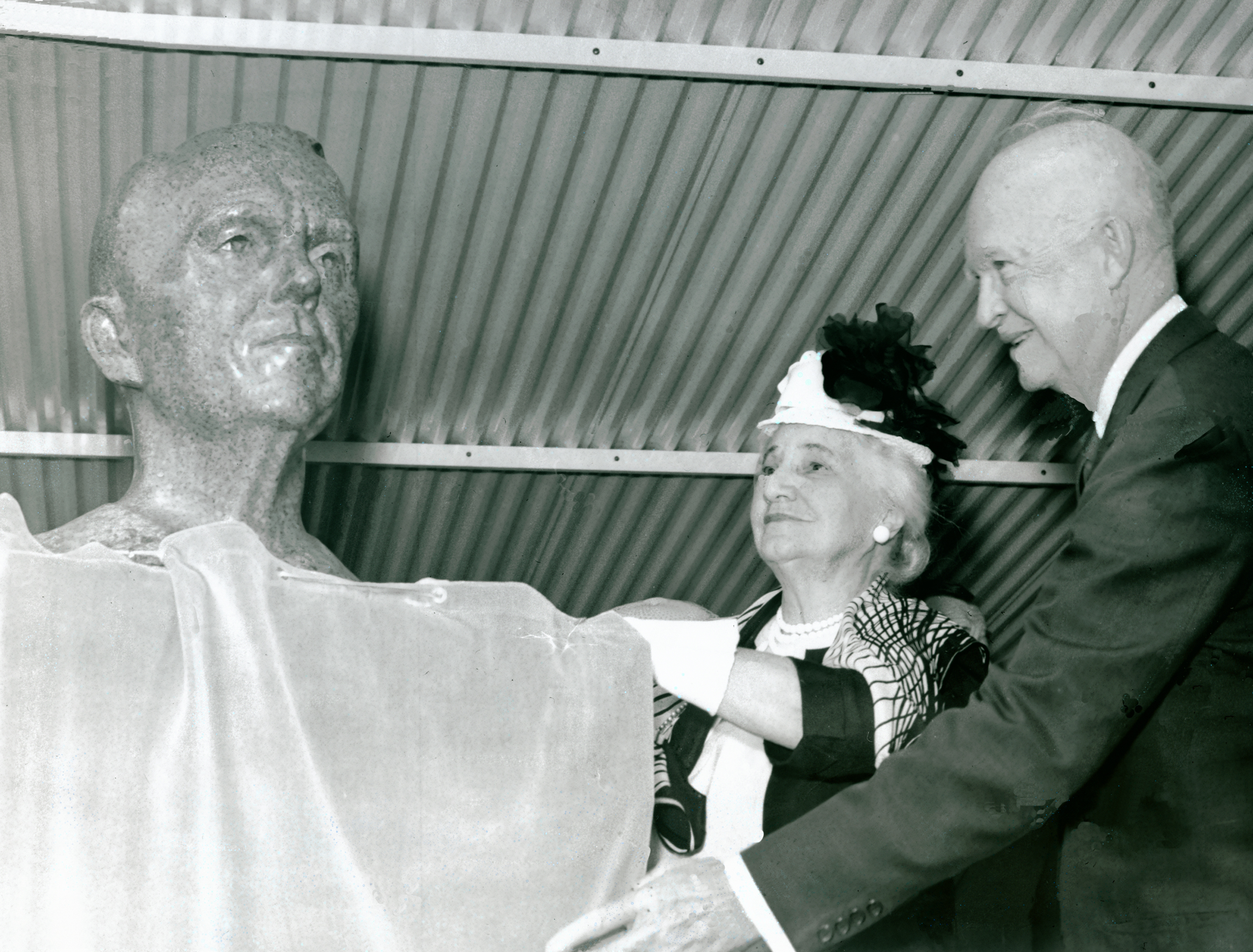
  Dwight Eisenhower and Katherine Marshall unveil a bust of Marshall at the Marshall Space Flight Center. September 8, 1960.
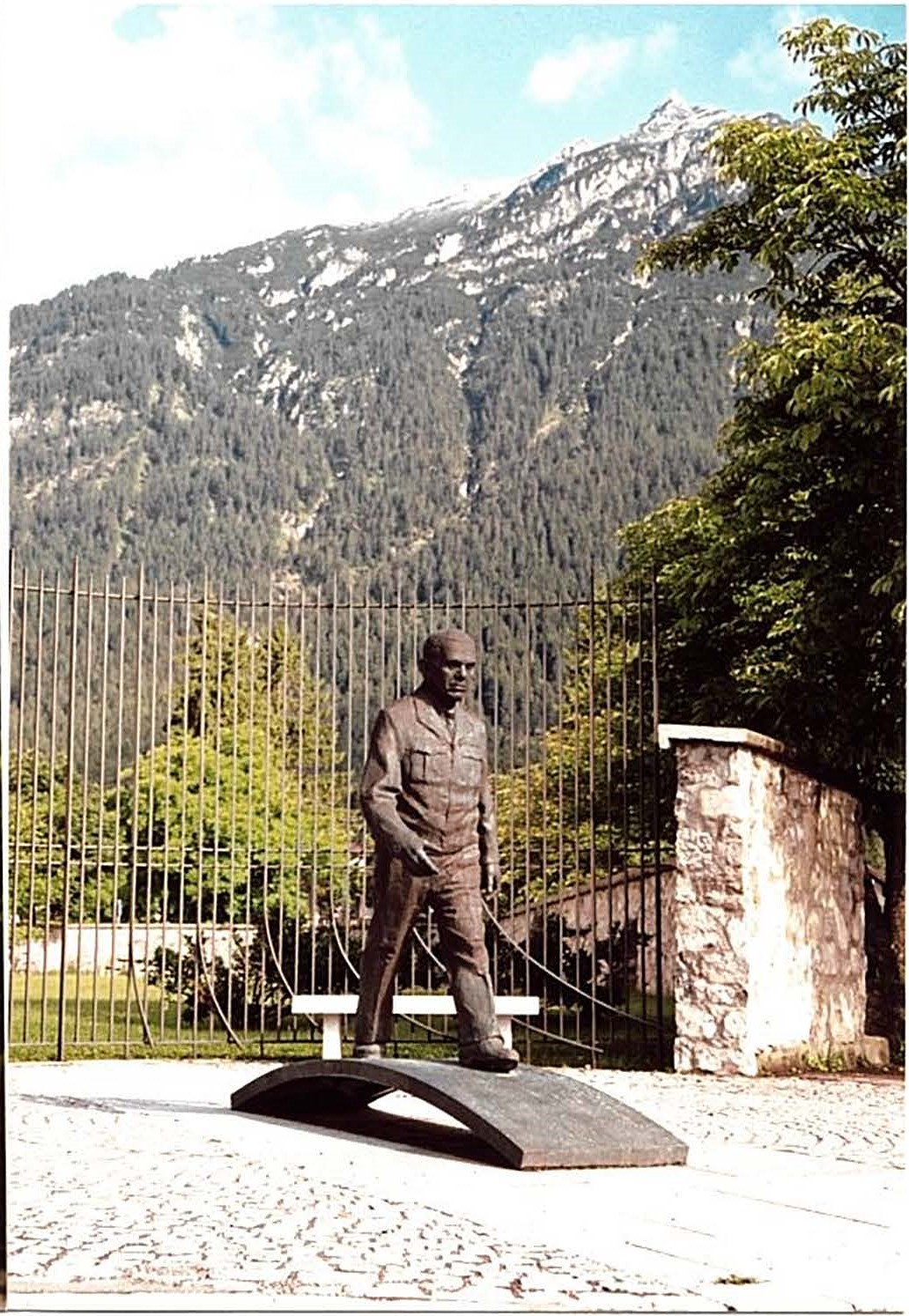
  Bronze statue of General Marshall at the George C. Marshall European Center for Security Studies in Garmisch-Partenkirchen, Germany
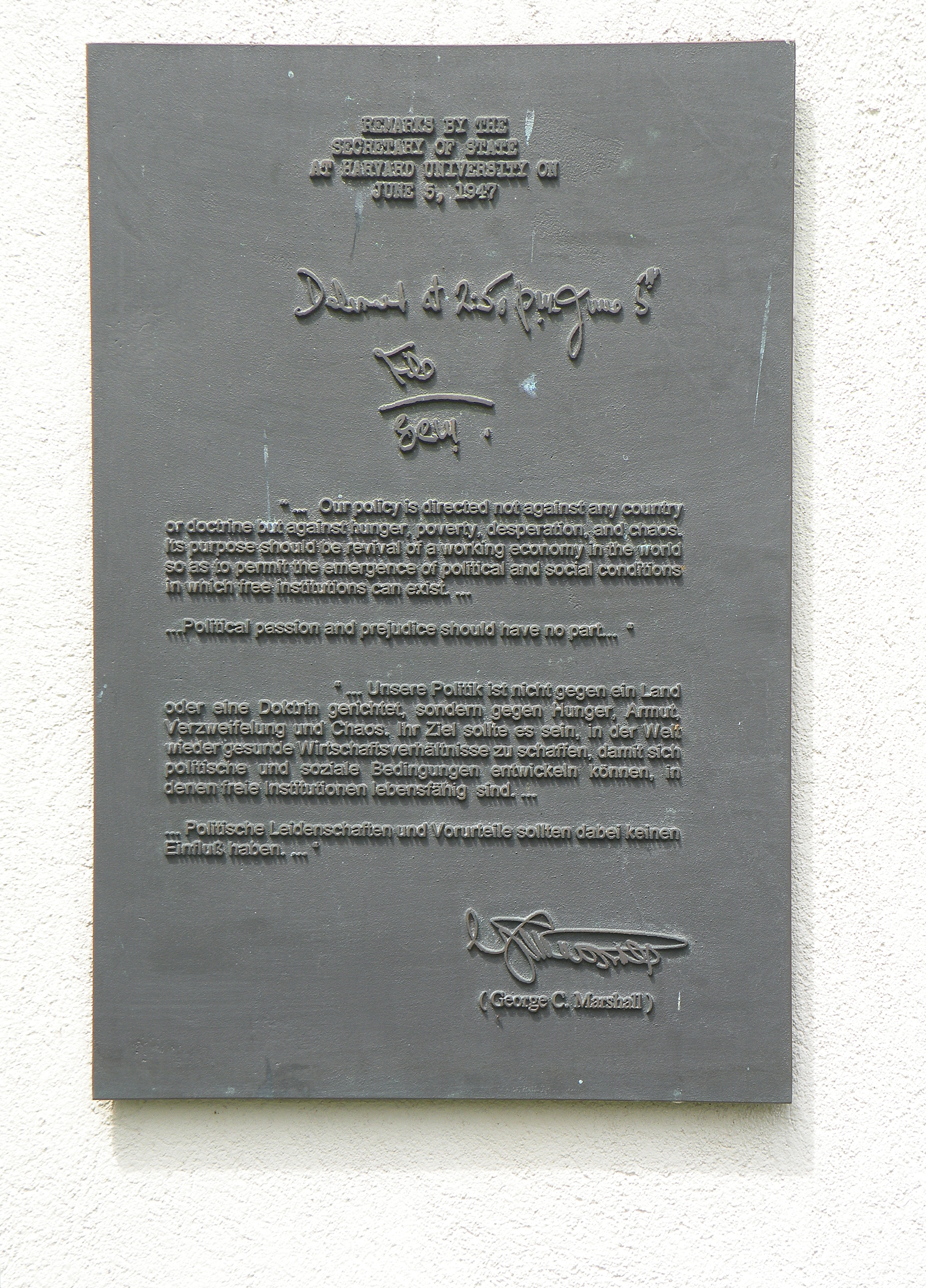
  Plaque in Langwasser, Germany with excerpts of Marshall's speech announcing the Marshall Plan
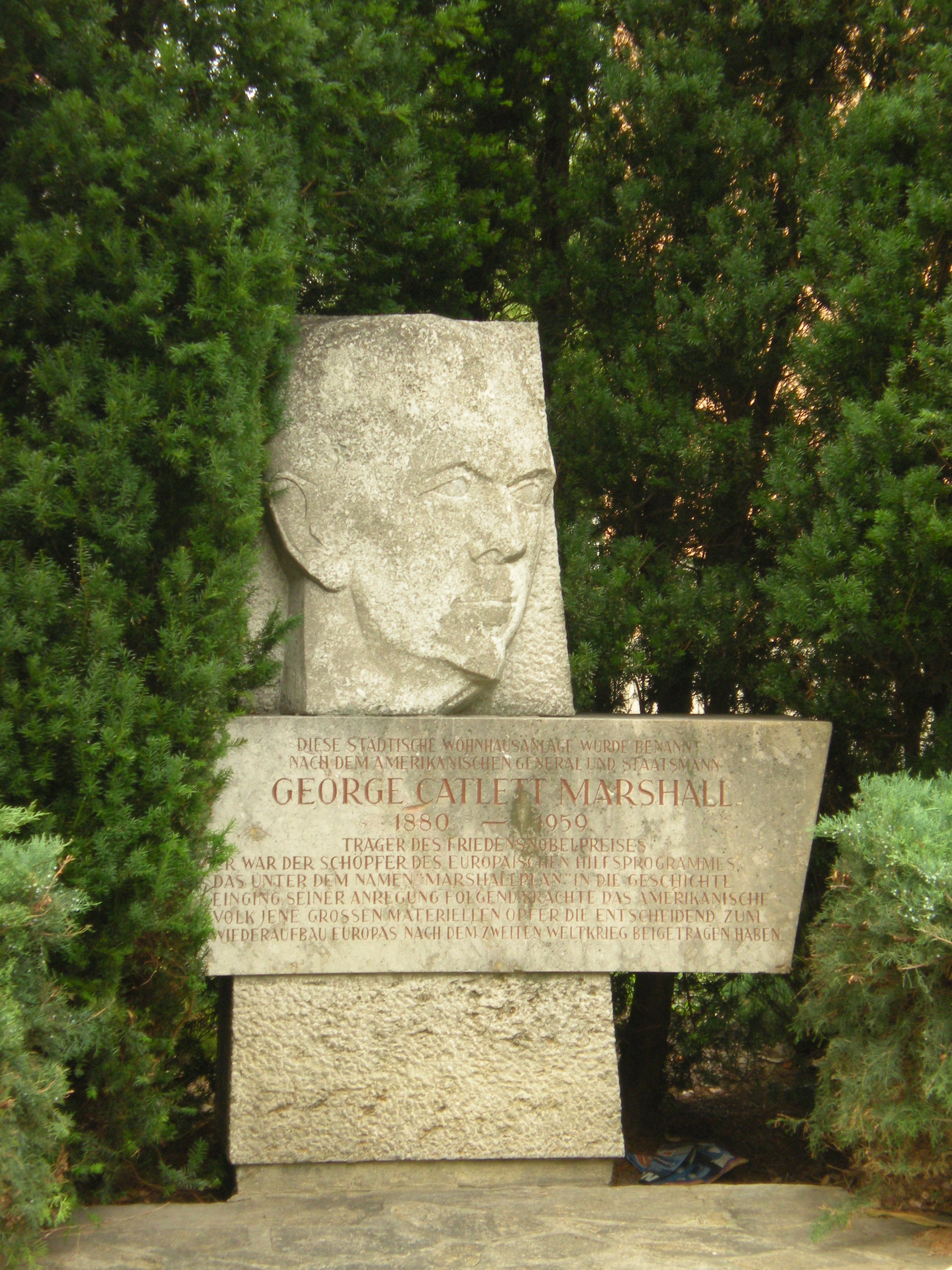
  Marshall monument in the neighborhood of Kaisermühlen in Vienna, Austria
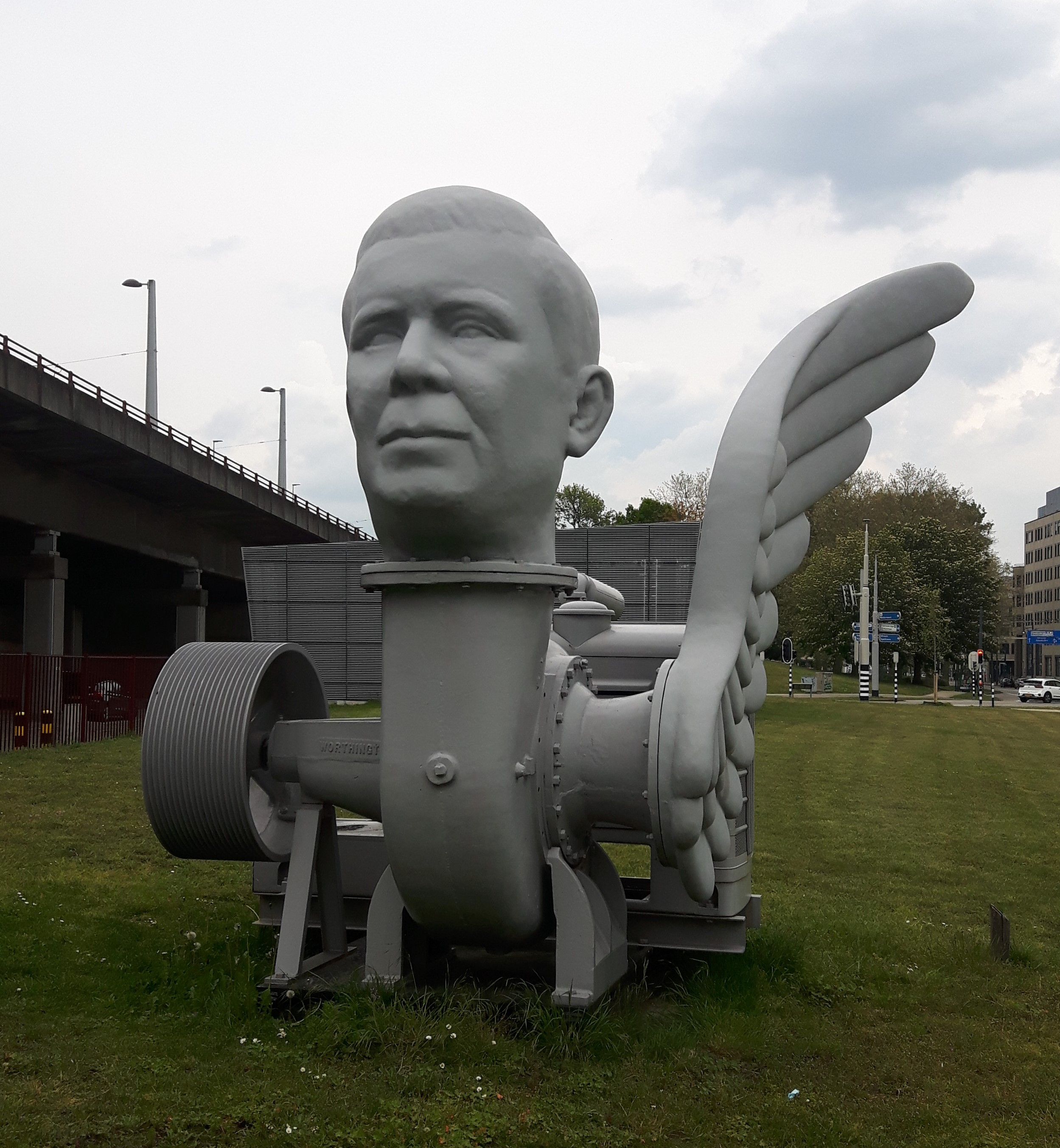
  "De Sfinx van Arnhem" with the head of General Marshall in the Netherlands
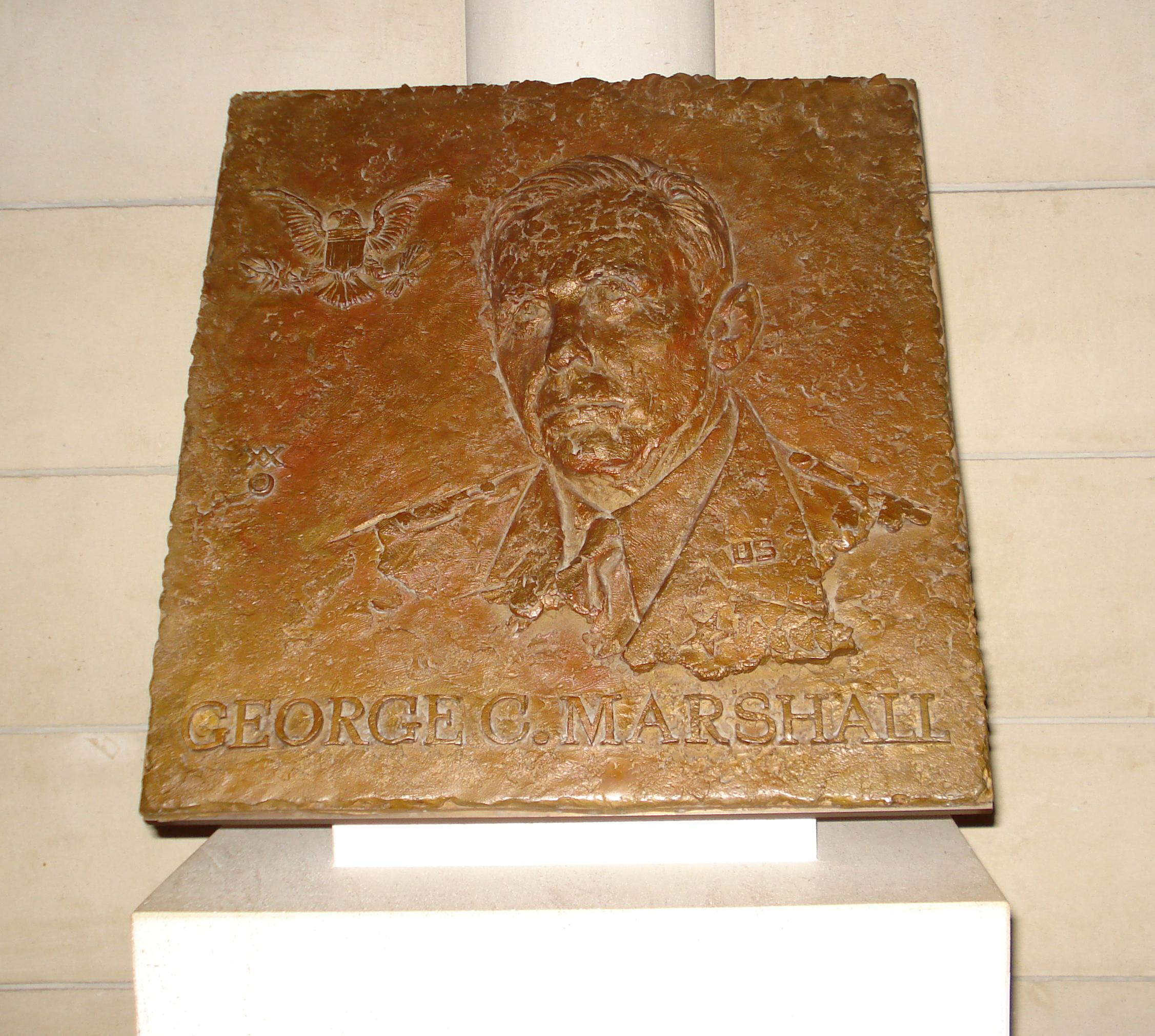
  Plaque of Marshall inside Rotterdam City Hall, the Netherlands
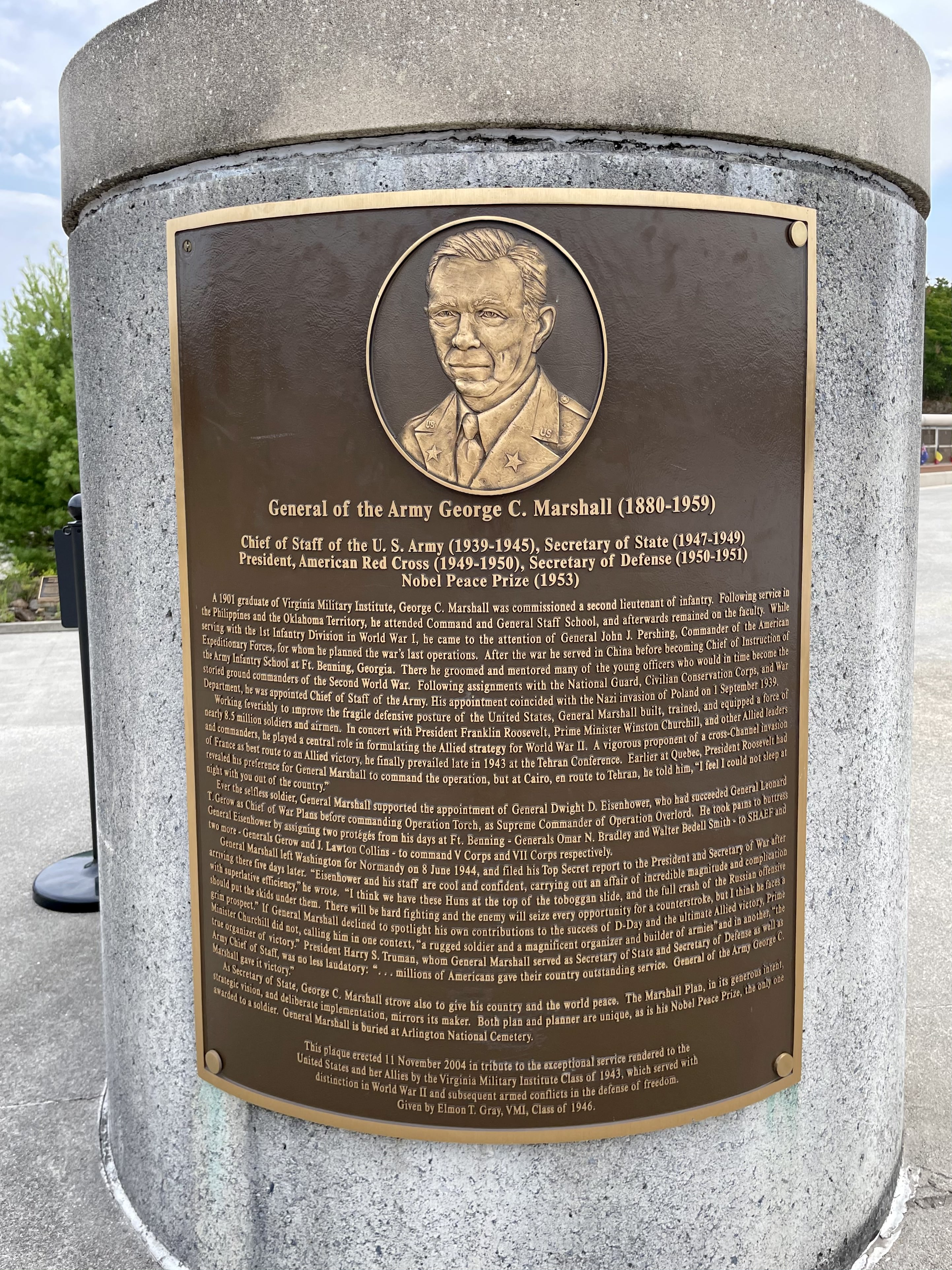
  Plaque dedicated to General Marshall at the National D-Day Memorial, Bedford, Virginia
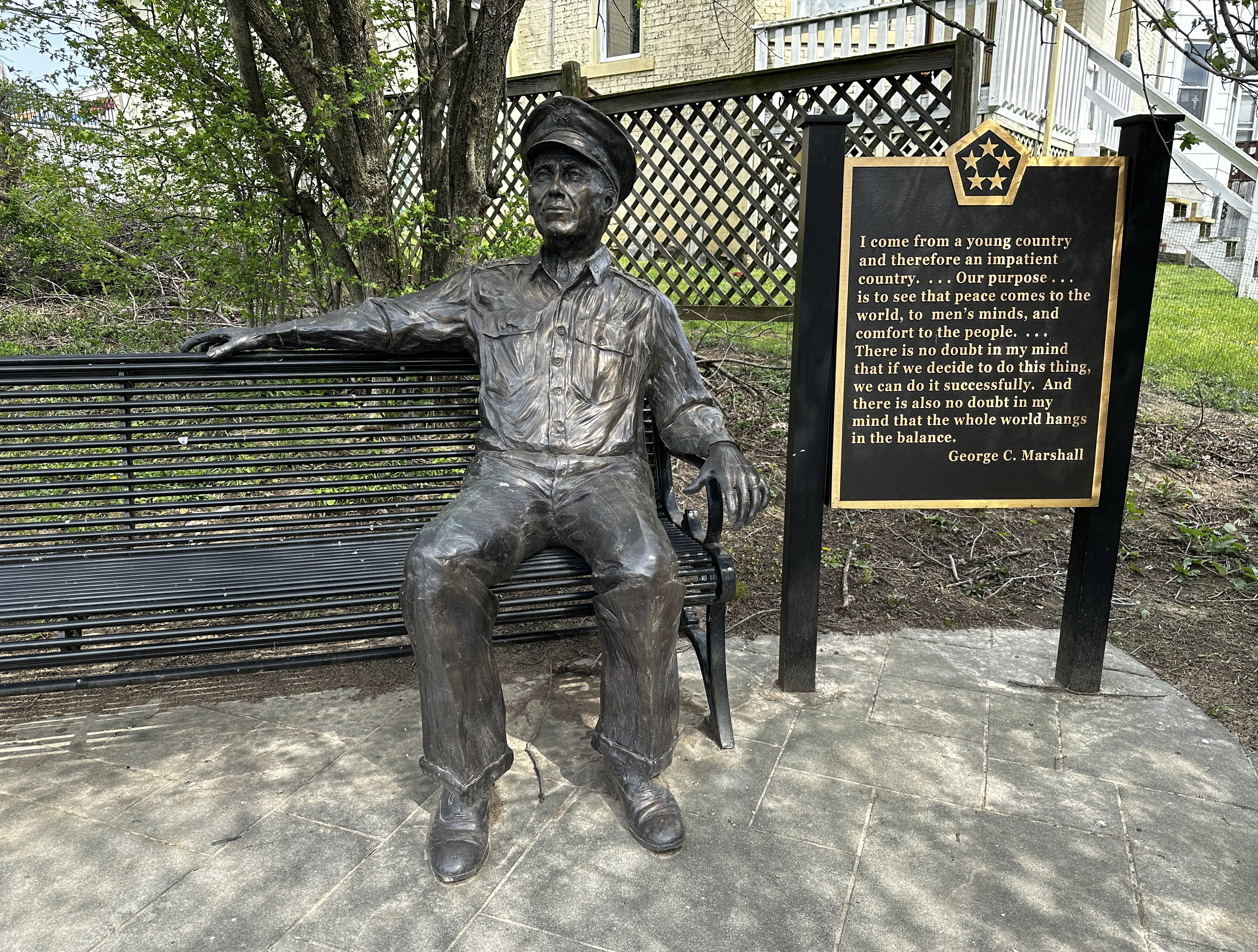
  Seated statue of General Marshall near George C. Marshall Memorial Plaza in Uniontown, Pennsylvania
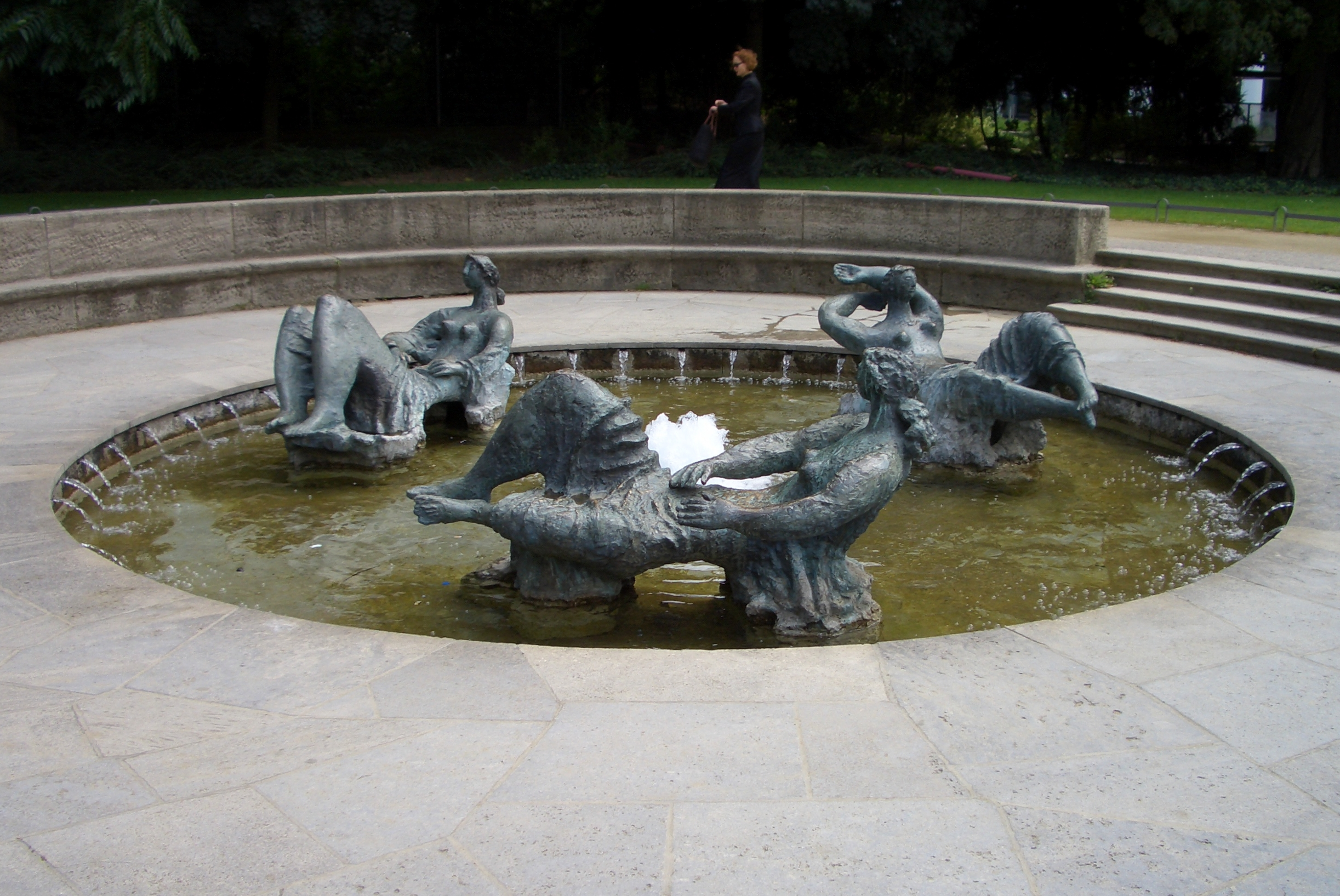
  Marshall-Brunnen fountain in Frankfurt, Germany
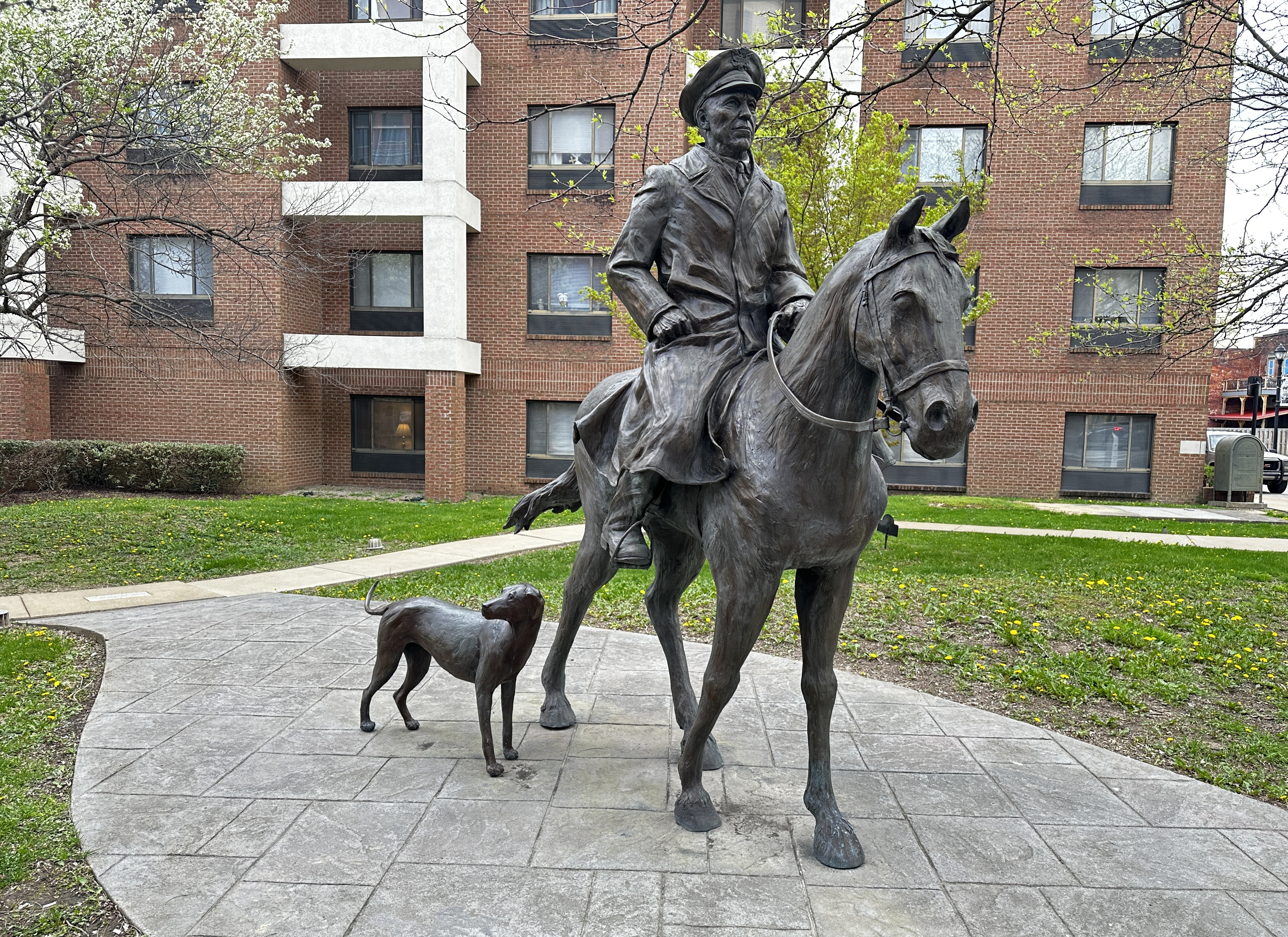
  General Marshall Equestrian Statue in Uniontown, Pennsylvania
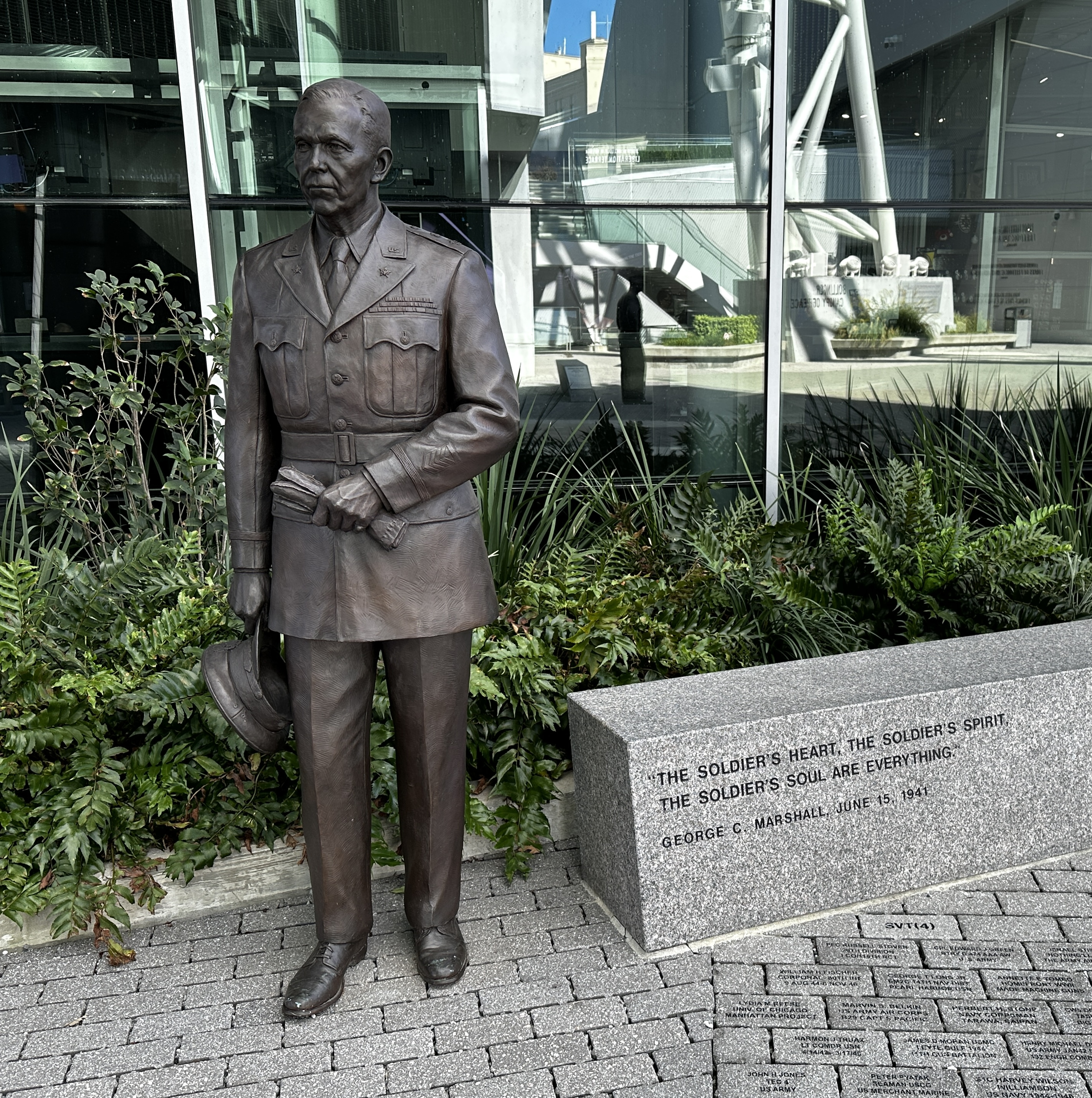
  Bronze life-size statue at the National WWII Museum in New Orleans, Louisiana
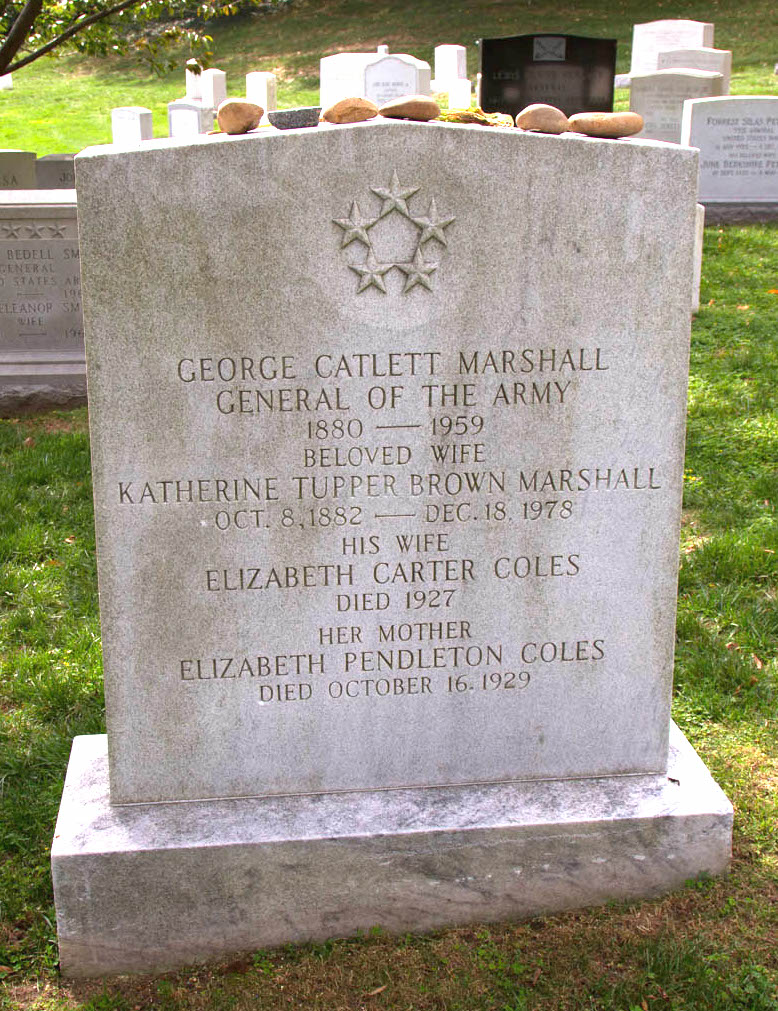
  Headstone of General Marshall and other family members in Arlington National Cemetery, Arlington, Virginia

== Museums ==
- George C. Marshall International Center, a non-profit organization that preserves Dodona Manor and interprets Marshall's legacy.
- George C. Marshall Foundation, a non-profit research library that holds Marshall's official papers and two million other documents, maps, and photographs.
- The Marshall House, a Victorian home named for General Marshall in Vancouver, Washington. George Marshall lived in the home from 1936 to 1937 while commanding the 5th Brigade of the Civilian Conservation Corps at Vancouver Barracks.
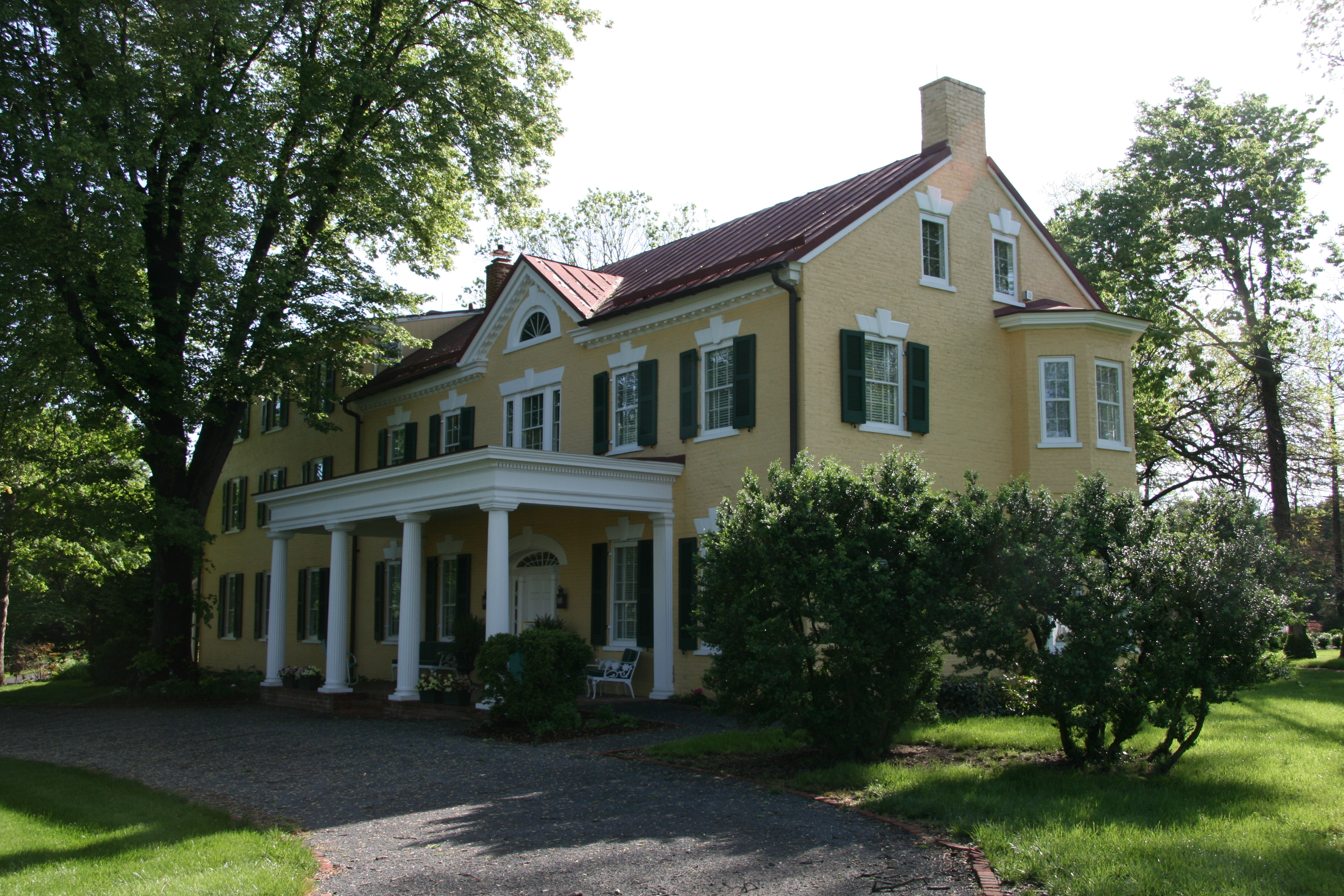
  Dodona Manor, open as a museum by the George C. Marshall International Center
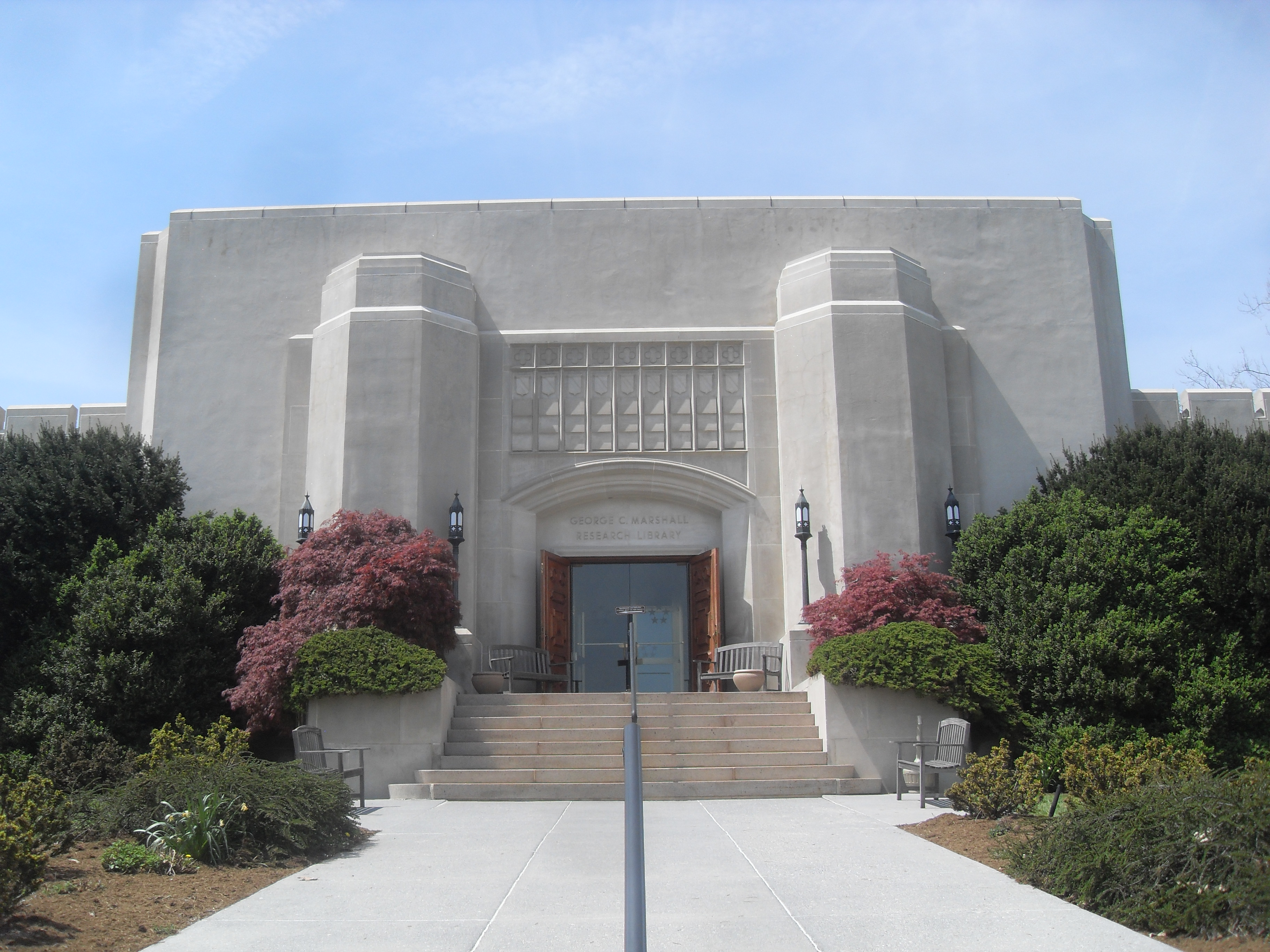
  George C. Marshall Foundation in Lexington, Virginia
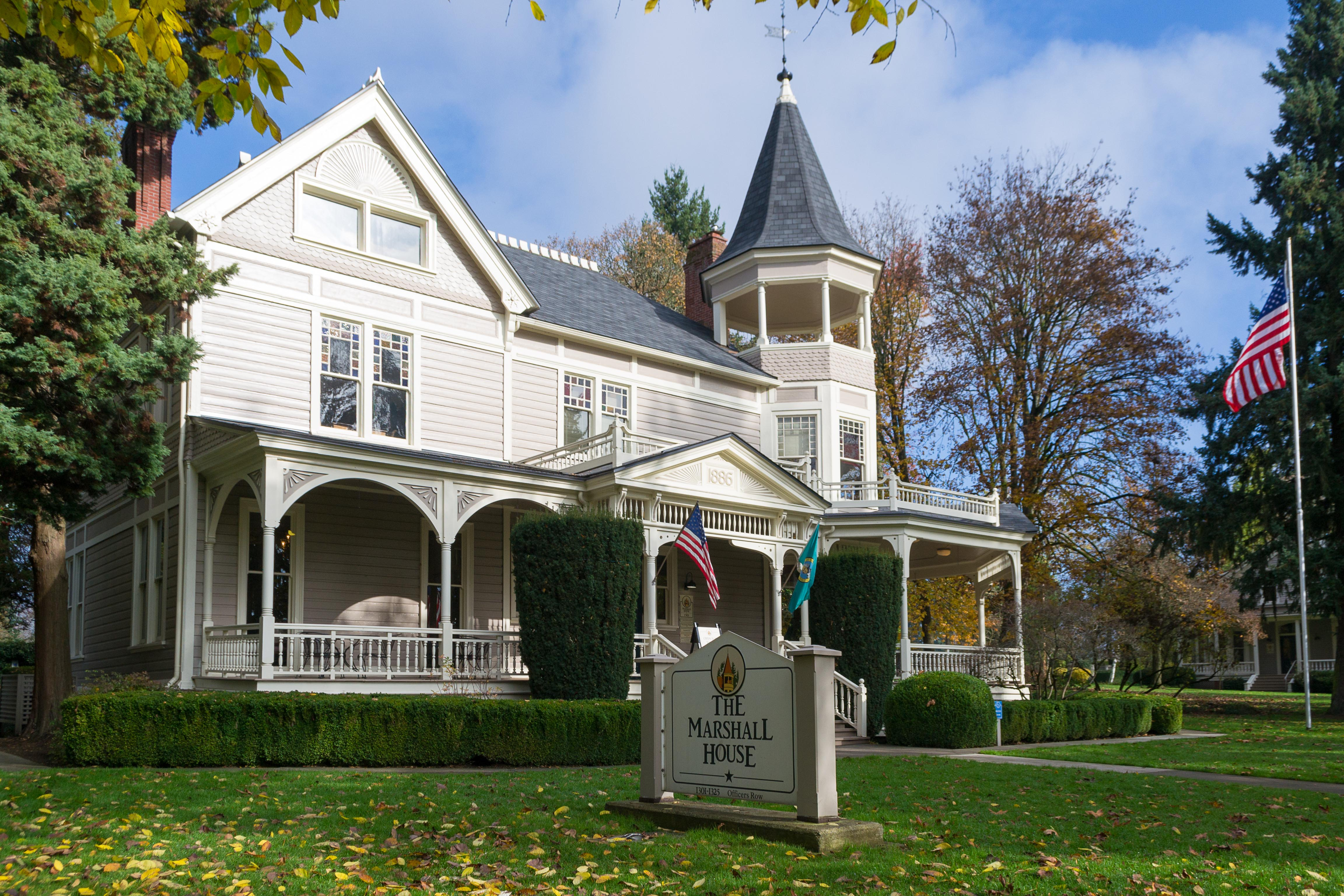
  The Marshall House in Vancouver, Washington

== Awards ==
- George C. Marshall Award, awarded to a citizen of Leesburg, Virginia who has demonstrated an exemplary commitment to the community.
- George Catlett Marshall Medal, awarded by the Association of the United States Army.
- George C. Marshall Citizen-Soldier Award, given bi-annually to a Virginia Military Institute first classman or rising first classman best modeling the attributes displayed by Marshall as a cadet.
- George C. Marshall Award, awarded to the top Army Reserve Officers' Training Corps cadet from each program and selected US Military Academy cadets.
- George C. Marshall Foundation Award, presented to an individual by the George C. Marshall Foundation who has made a significant contribution to foster international economic development and to establish, in Marshall's words, “economic health in the world, without which there can be no political stability and no assured peace.”
- George C. Marshall Award, the highest award given to a chapter in Kappa Alpha Order.
- George C. Marshall Leadership Award, awarded to a resident of Vancouver, Washington by the Historic Trust and "recognizes a person’s leadership potential, commitment to public service, and strength of character."
- Marshall Award in History, awarded by the George C. Marshall Foundation and recognizes history majors at the Virginia Military Institute. Award recipients write a research paper using the Foundation's archival holdings.
- George C. Marshall Award, awarded by the American Hellenic Educational Progressive Association.
- General George C. Marshall Award, created in 1960 by the Command and General Staff College to recognize the scholarship and leadership of a graduate each year.
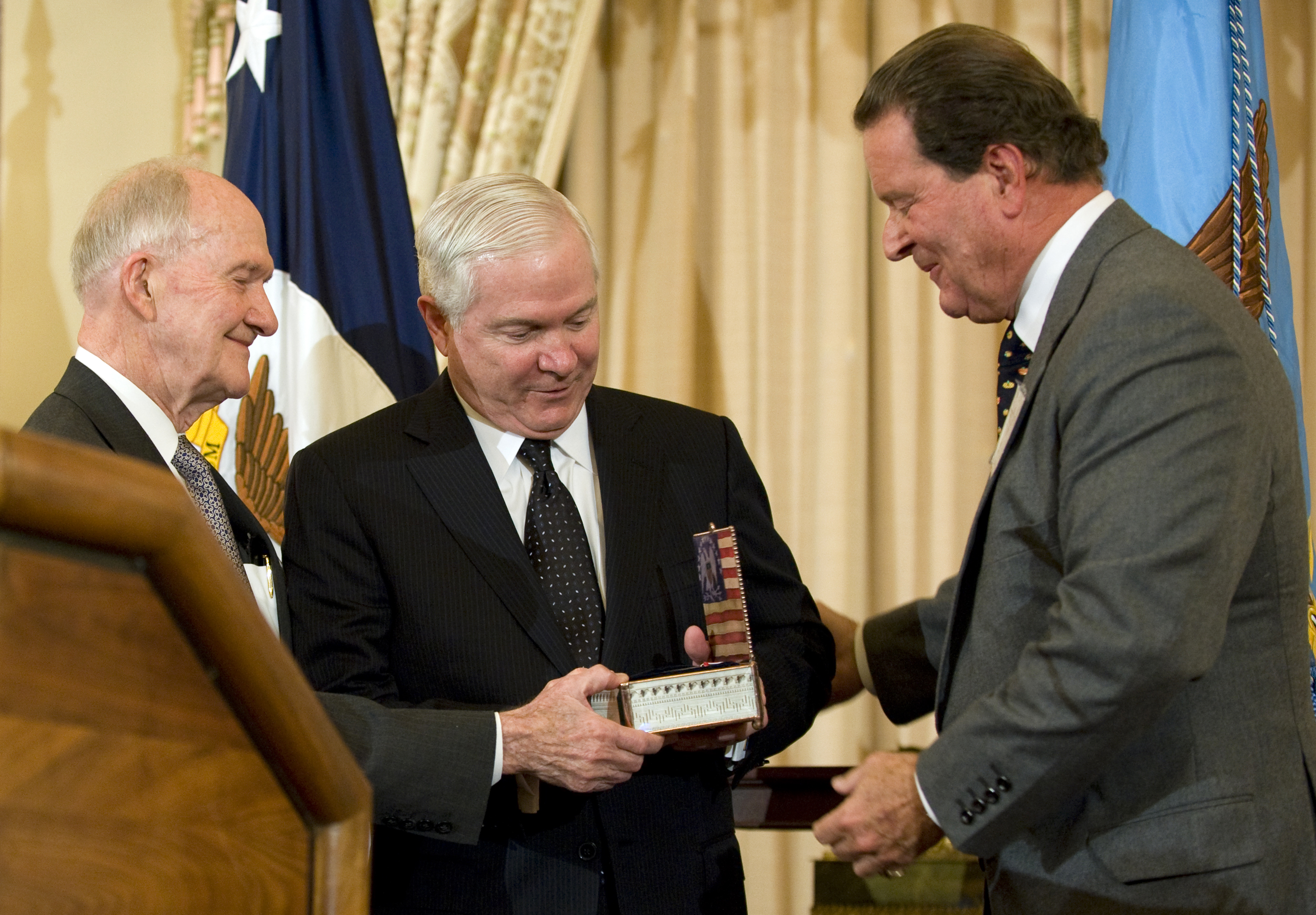
  Lt. Gen. Brent Scowcroft, left, and Chairman of the Board John B. Adams, Jr., present the George C. Marshall Foundation Award to Secretary of Defense Robert M. Gates. October 16, 2009.

== Transportation ==
- George-Marshall-Straße in Wiesbaden, Germany.
- George-C.-Marshall-Ring in Oberursel, Germany.
- George C. Marshall Drive Northeast in Leesburg, Virginia.
- George C. Marshall Drive in Idylwood, Virginia.
- General George C. Marshall Parkway in Fayette County, Pennsylvania. Designated on October 2, 1975 by the Commonwealth of Pennsylvania.
- George-C.-Marshall-Brücke in Tiergarten, Berlin, Germany. Spanning the Landwehr Canal, the bridge was built from 1996–1998 by architects Gerkan, Marg and partners.
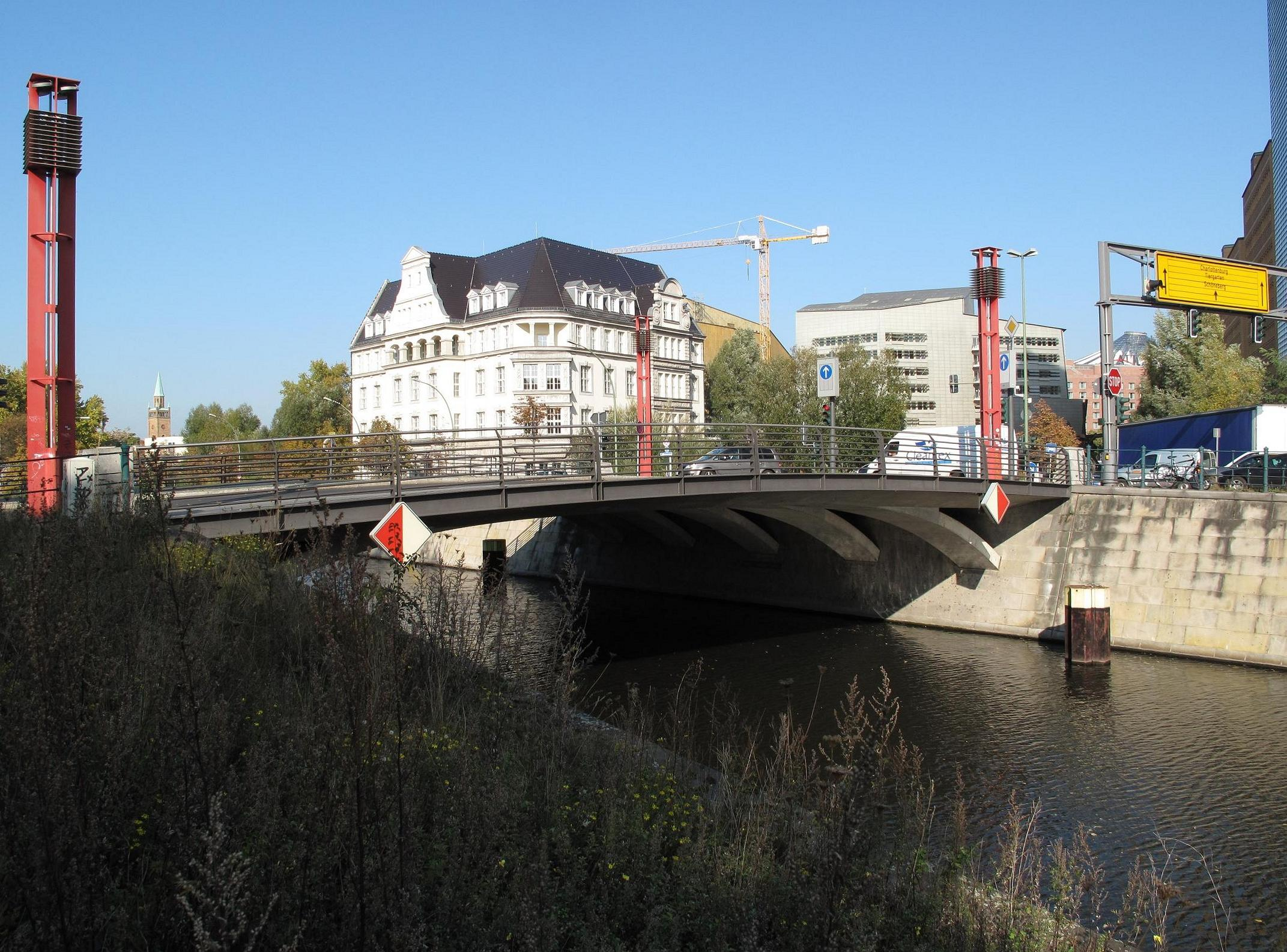
  George-C.-Marshall-Brücke in Berlin, Germany
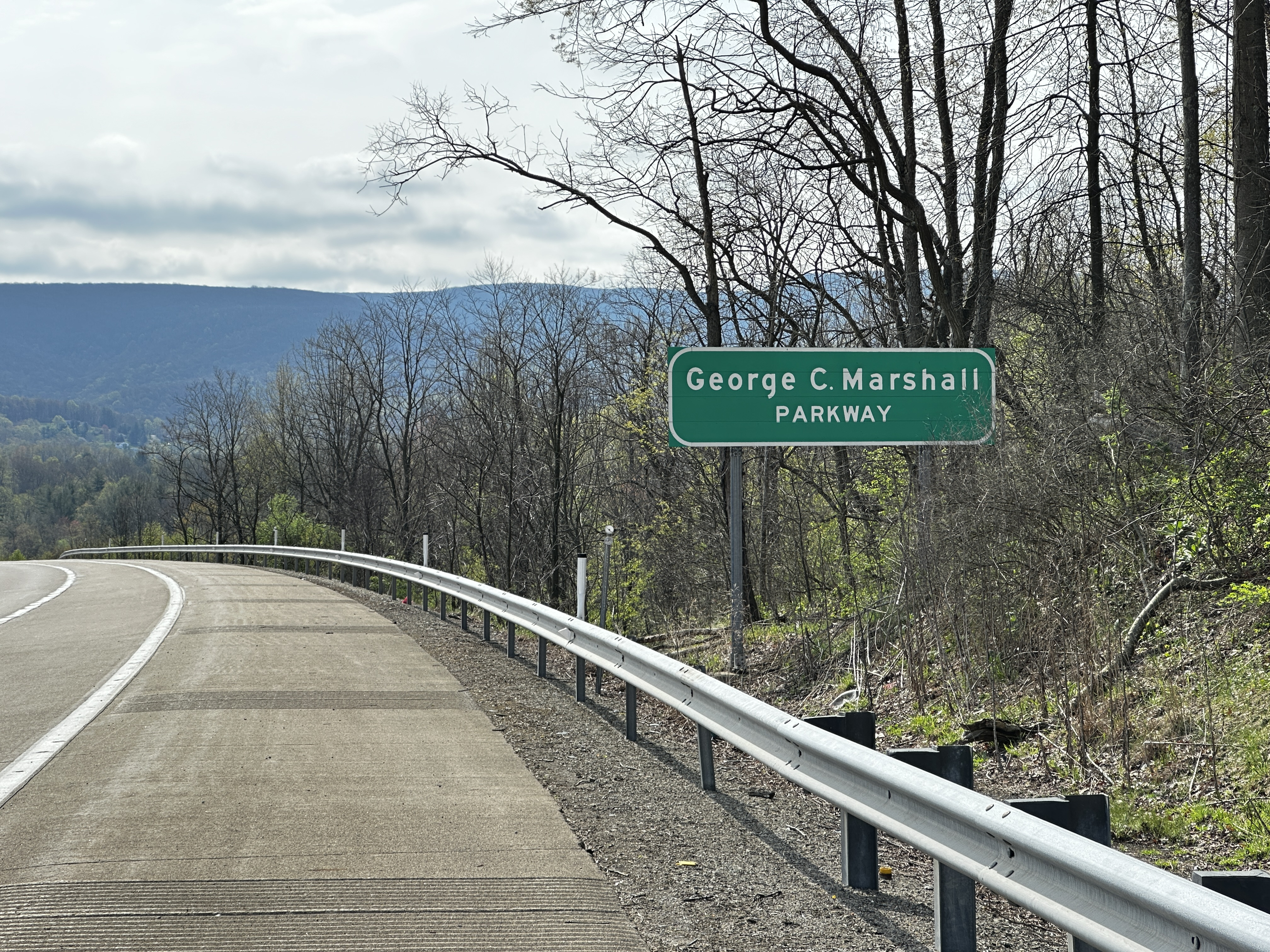
  Road sign for George C. Marshall Parkway near Uniontown, Pennsylvania

== Coinage ==
- 1976 – Sterling silver medal. Minted for the "Gallery of Great Americans" set.
- 1982 – Germany commemorative silver 23rd thaler.
- 1997 – Netherlands 10 Gulden KM# 224 silver coin.
- 2008 – United States commemorative gold coin. Minted for the "Leaders of World War II" series by the U.S. Mint.
- 2013 – United States $1 silver commemorative coin. Minted for the "5-Star Generals Commemorative Coin Program" by the U.S. Mint.
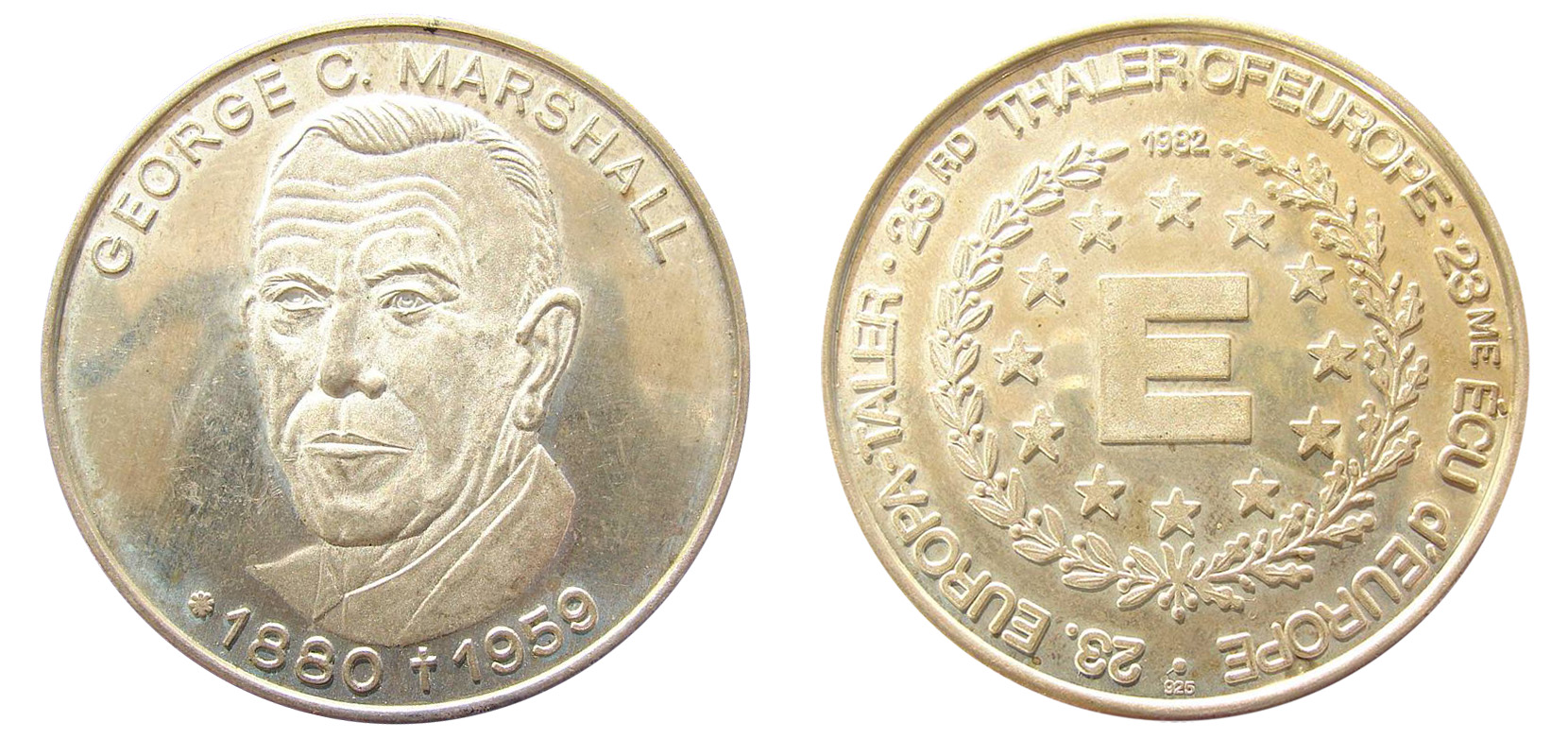
  Medallion issued in 1982 to honor George Marshall's post-war work for Europe.
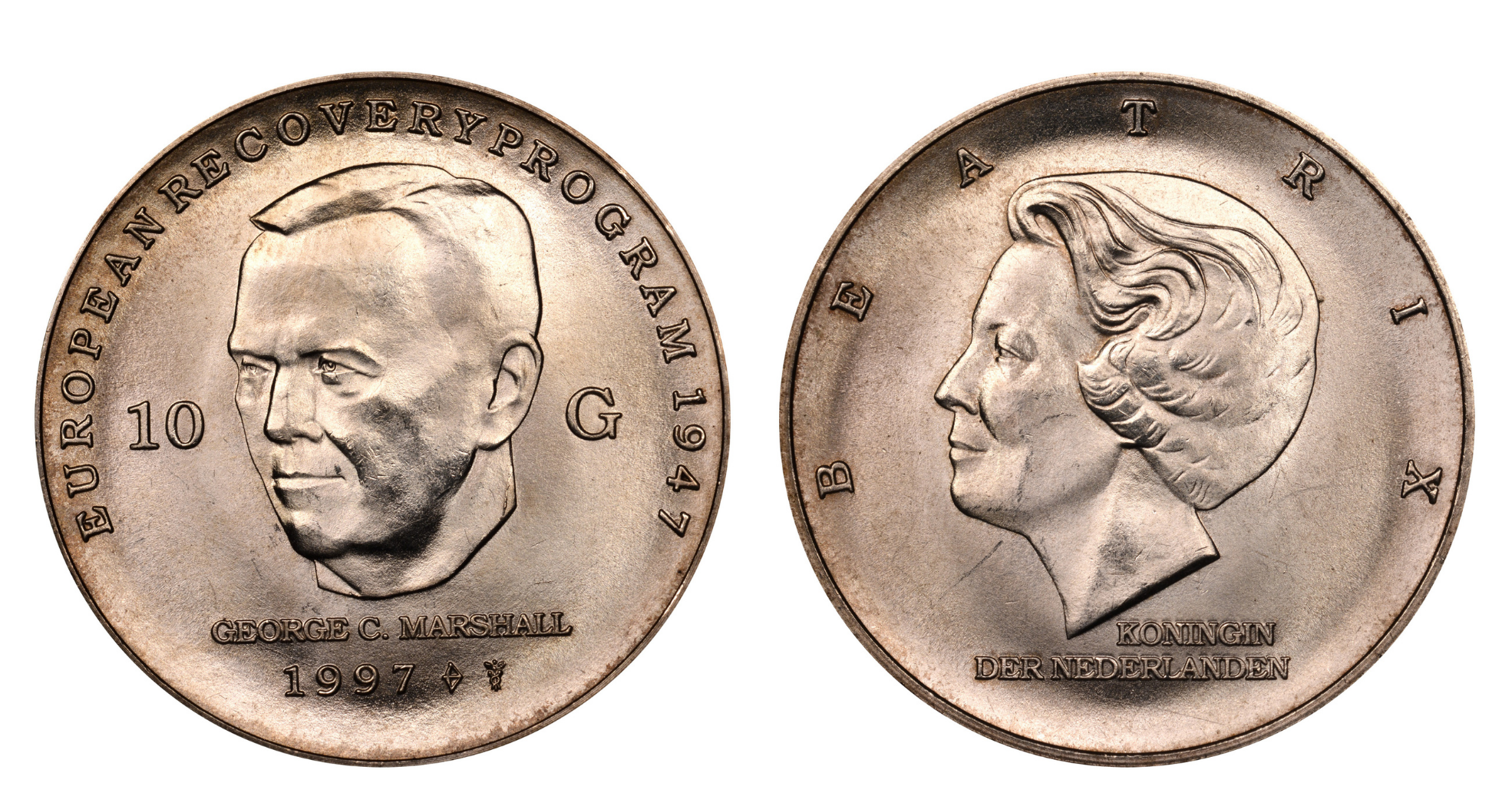
  Netherlands 10 Gulden silver coin honoring Marshall for the 50th anniversary of the Marshall Plan in 1997.
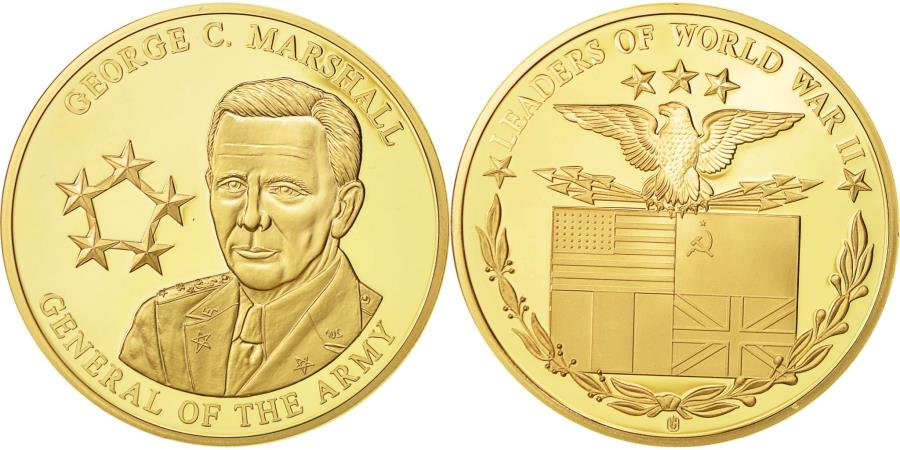
  Commemorative gold coin issued by the U.S. Mint in 2008 as part of the "Leaders in World War II" series.
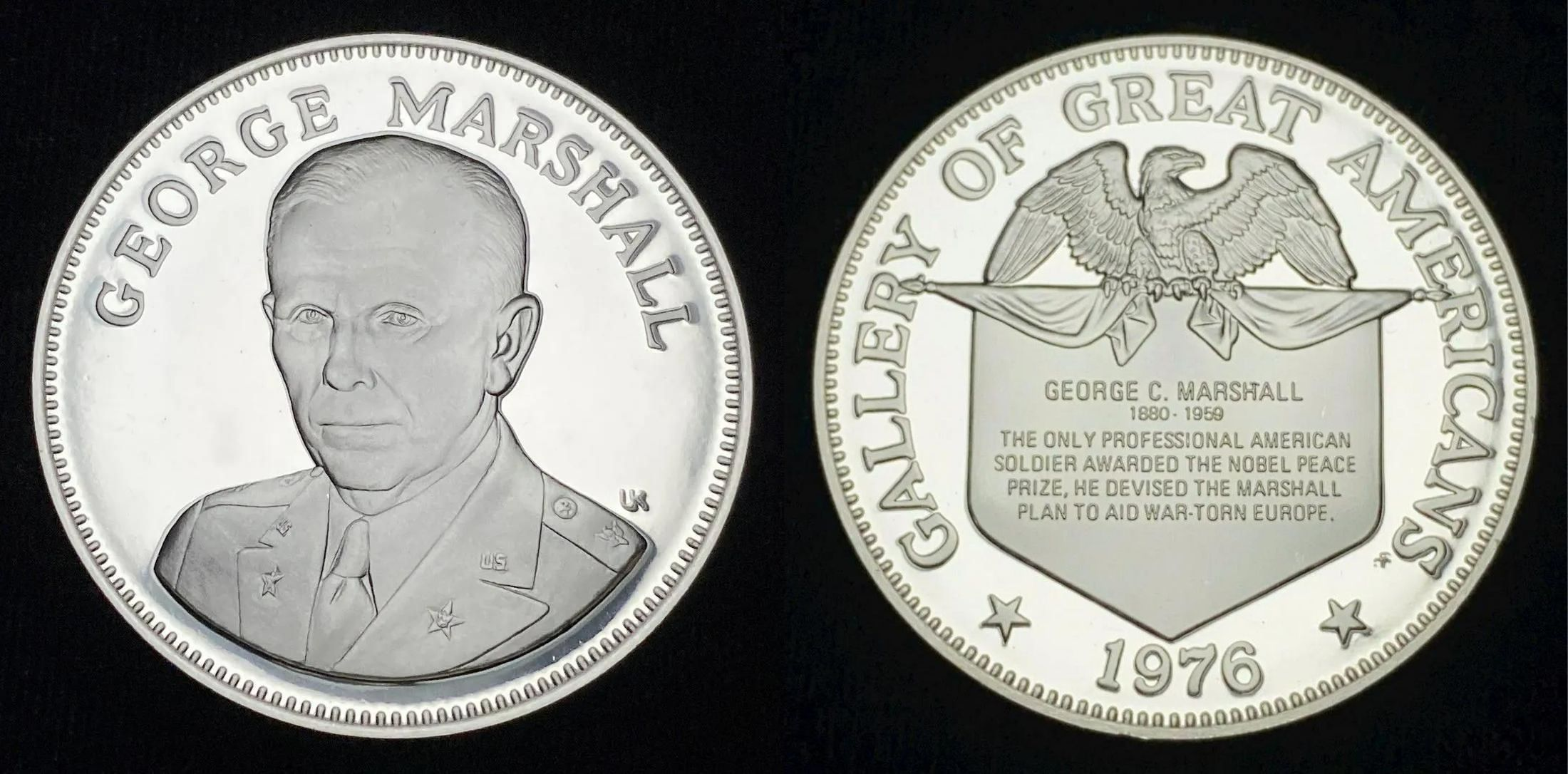
  Silver medal honoring General Marshall as part of the 1976 "Gallery of Great Americans" series.

== Organizations ==
- George C. Marshall European Center for Security Studies in Garmisch-Partenkirchen, Germany.
- George C. Marshall Institute, a non-profit conservative think tank. Established in 1984 and dissolved in 2015.
- George C. Marshall Space Flight Center, originally the Army Ballistic Missile Agency at Redstone Arsenal, Huntsville, Alabama, became a NASA field center and was renamed in 1960.
- German Marshall Fund of the United States, a nonpartisan think tank dedicated to promoting cooperation between North American and Europe.
- George Marshall Society, dedicated to improving German-American relations and to underscore the historic importance of the Marshall Plan.
- Austrian Marshall Plan Foundation, established by the Economic Recovery Program to provide research cooperation between Austrian and the United States.
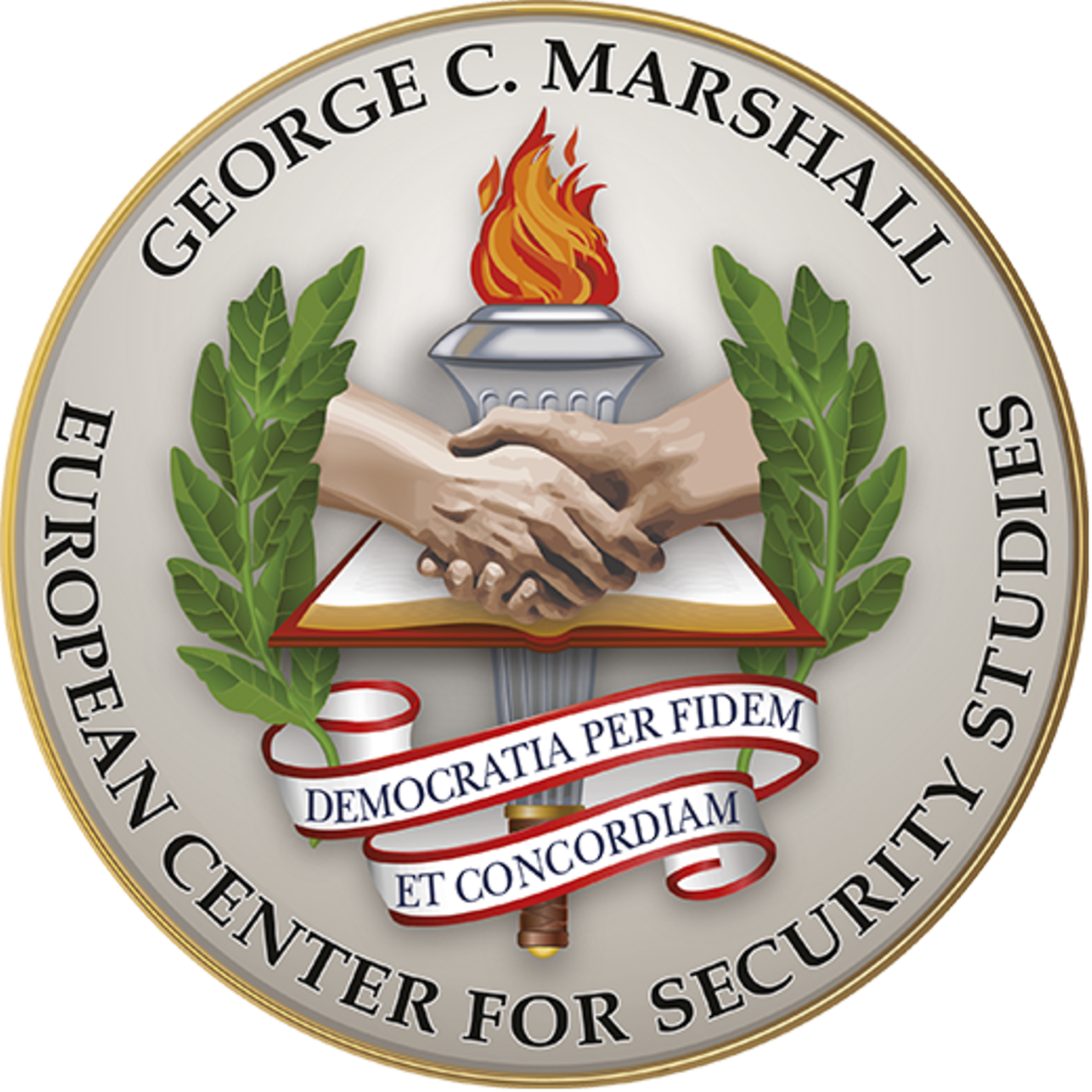
  Logo of the George C. Marshall European Center for Security Studies in Garmisch-Partenkirchen, Germany
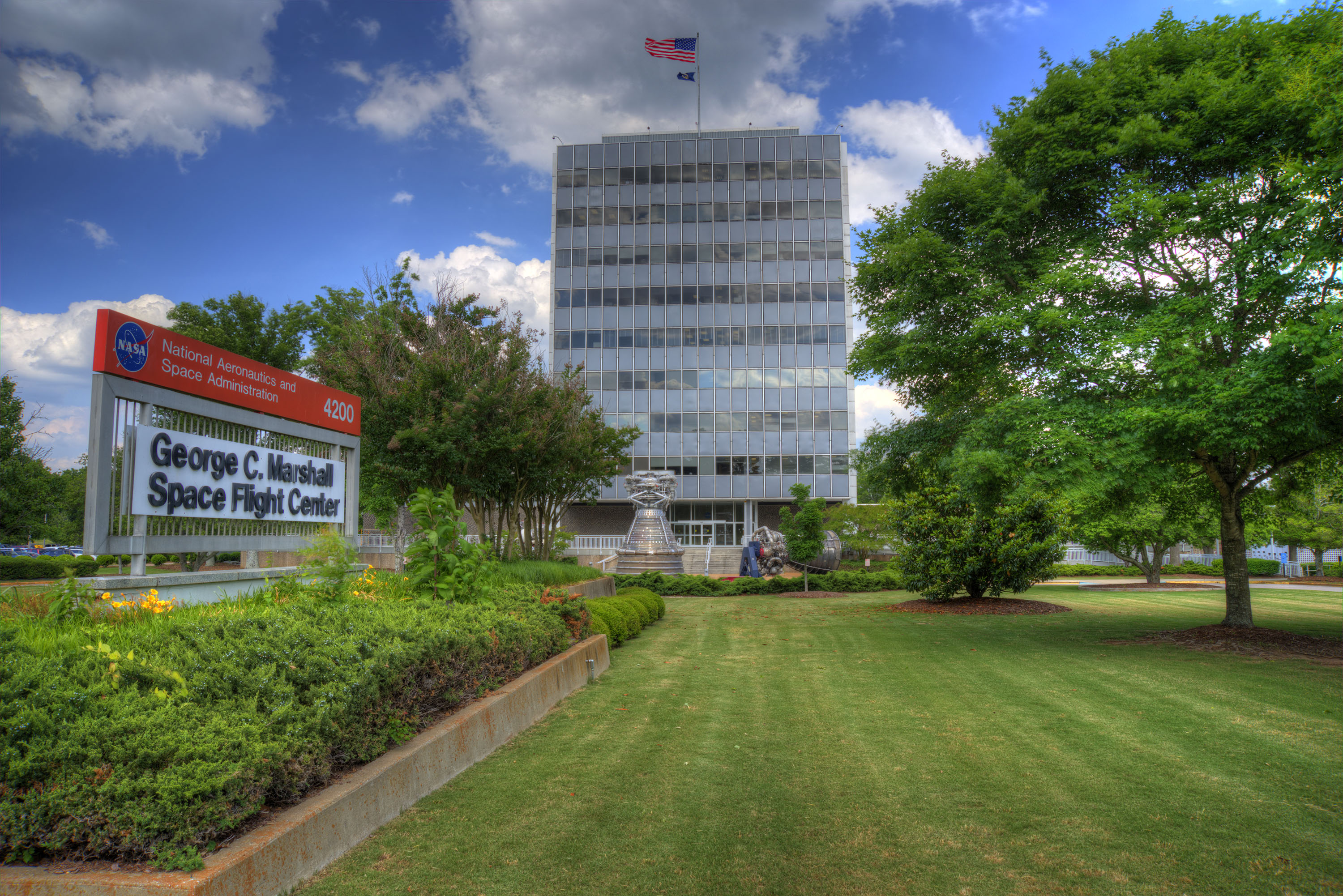
  George C. Marshall Space Flight Center in Huntsville, Alabama
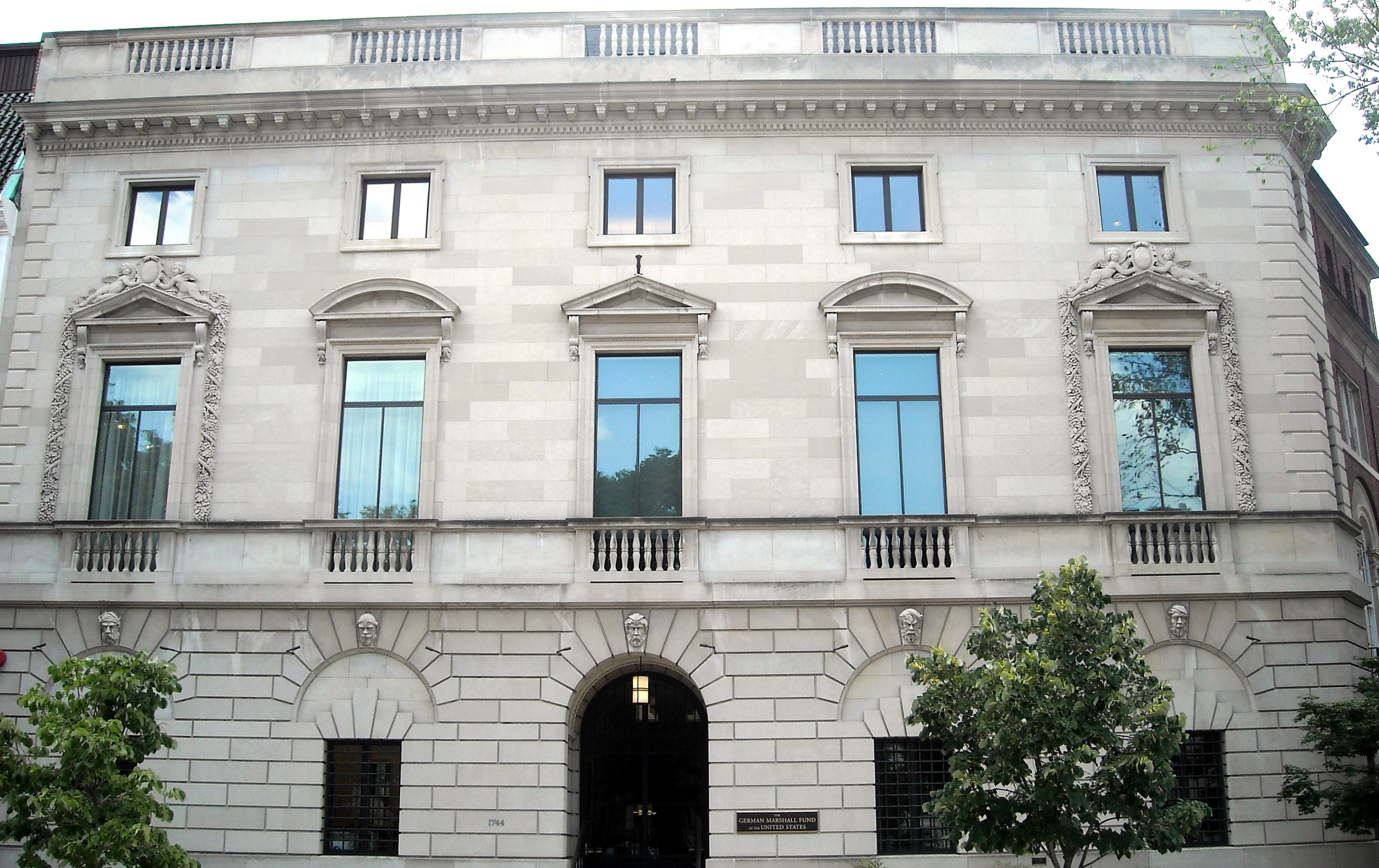
  German Marshall Fund in Washington, DC

== Objects ==
- 40 pfennig West German postage stamp. Printed by the Deutsche Bundespost in 1960.
- 20¢ U.S. postage stamp. Printed by the U.S. Postal Service in the Prominent Americans Series from 1965 to 1978.
- The Marshall Bell, a 7,595-pound bell installed in the Netherlands Carillon in Washington, DC in April 2021.
- 1962 Virginia Military Institute class ring, honoring to Marshall on the "class side."
- 32¢ U.S. postage stamp commemorating the 50th anniversary of the Marshall Plan. Printed by the U.S. Postal Service in 1997.
- 100 pfenning German postage stamp commemorating the 50th anniversary of the Marshall Plan. Printed by the Deutsche Bundespost in 1997.
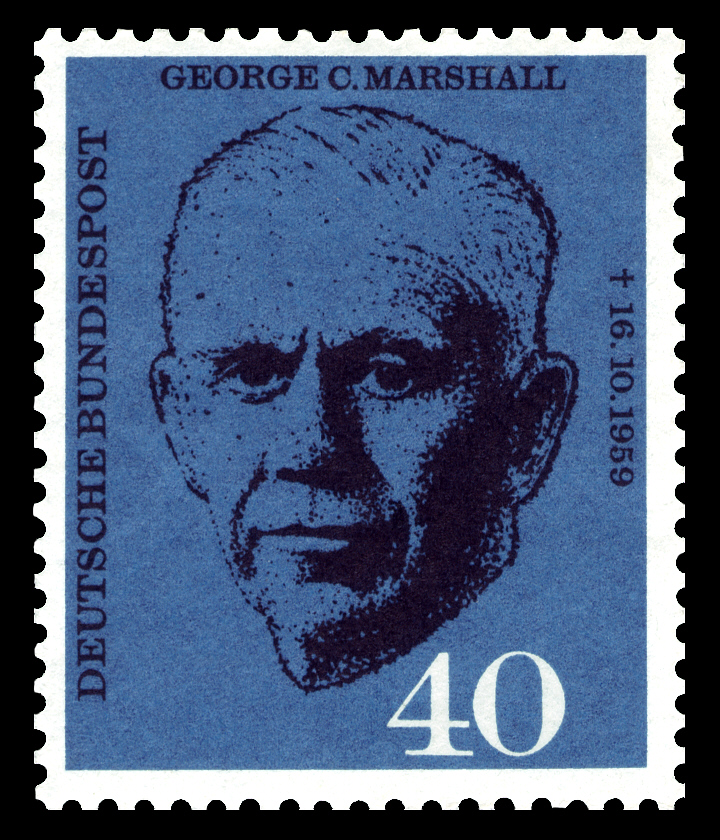
  1960 Deutsche Bundespost stamp honoring Marshall
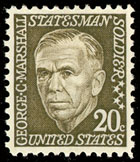
  1967 U.S. Postal Service stamp honoring Marshall
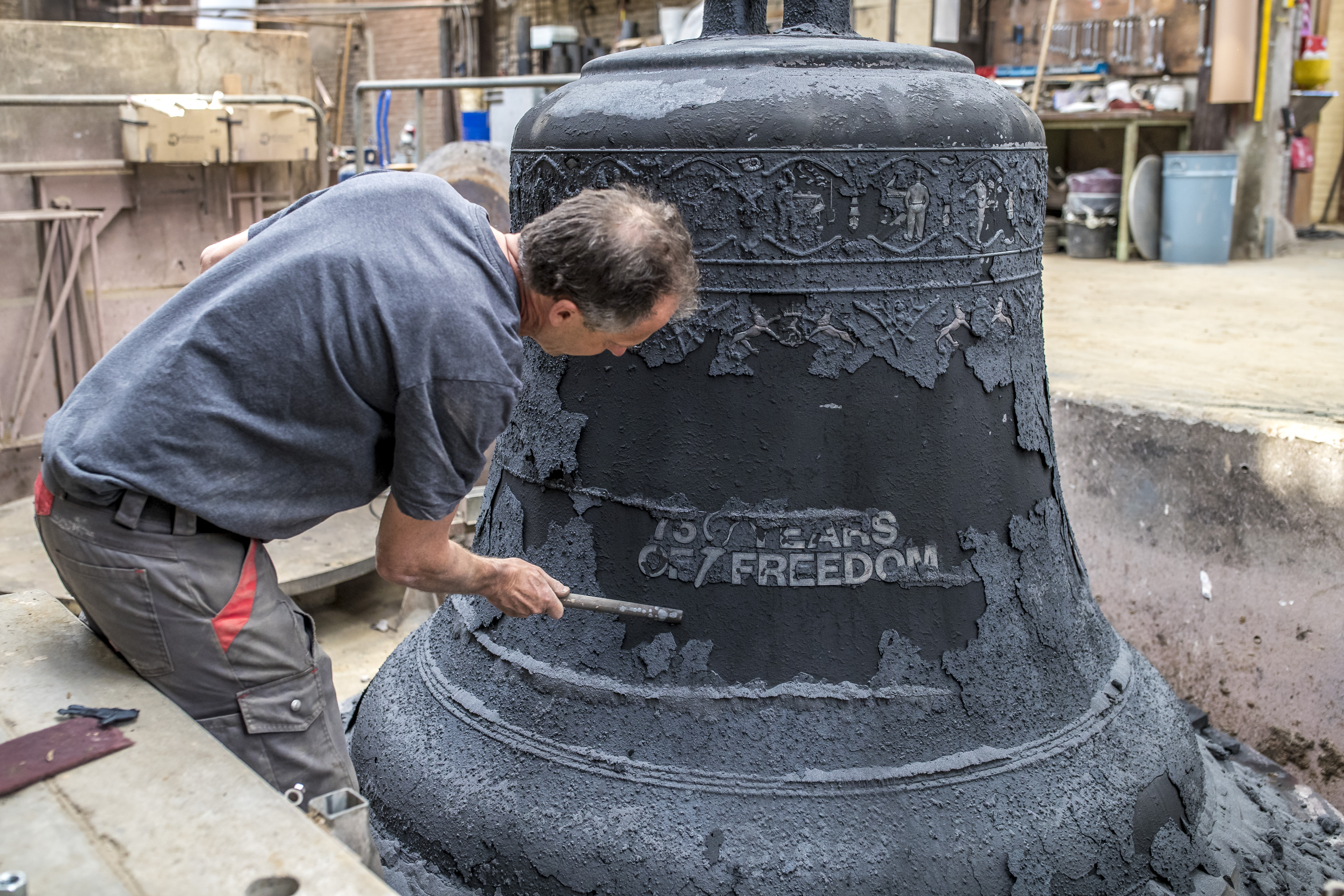
  The Marshall Bell being cast for the Netherlands Carillon in April 2020

== Buildings ==
- George C. Marshall American Veterans Post 103, located in Hopwood, Pennsylvania.
- The George-C.-Marshall-Haus in Berlin, Germany was built as the United States exhibition pavilion for the German Industrial Exhibition in 1950.
- Marshallhof, an urban residential complex in Vienna, Austria. Built from 1953–1959 by architect Hermann Stiegholzer. Dedicated to Marshall in 1961.
- Marshall Hall, a building on the campus of the Virginia Military Institute which houses the school's Center for Leadership and Ethics.
- Marshall Manor, an apartment complex for the elderly, operated the Fayette County Housing Authority in Uniontown, Pennsylvania. Established in 1972.
- Marshall Community Center, a public recreation hall including a pool, classrooms, and gym.
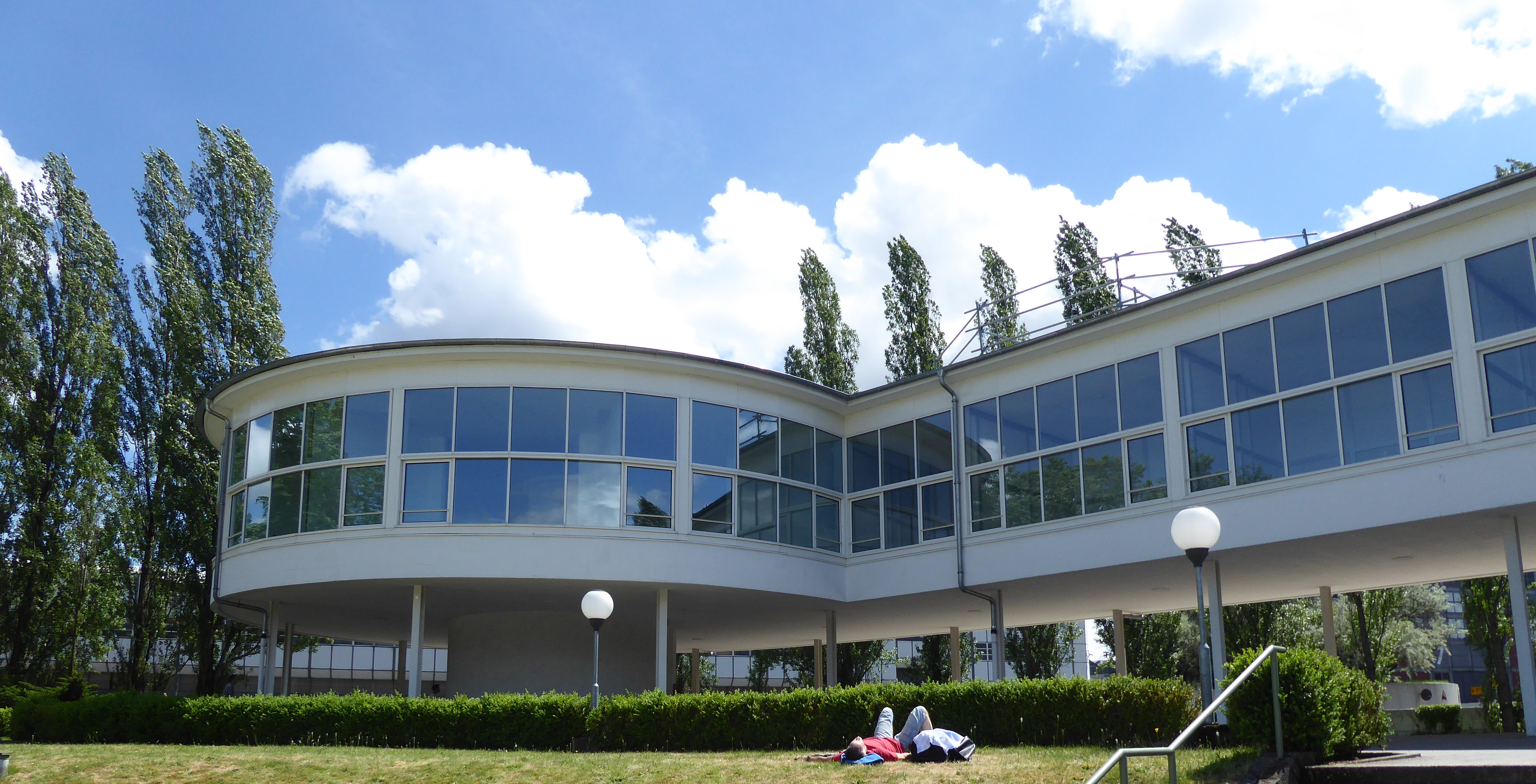
The George-C.-Marshall-Haus in Berlin, Germany

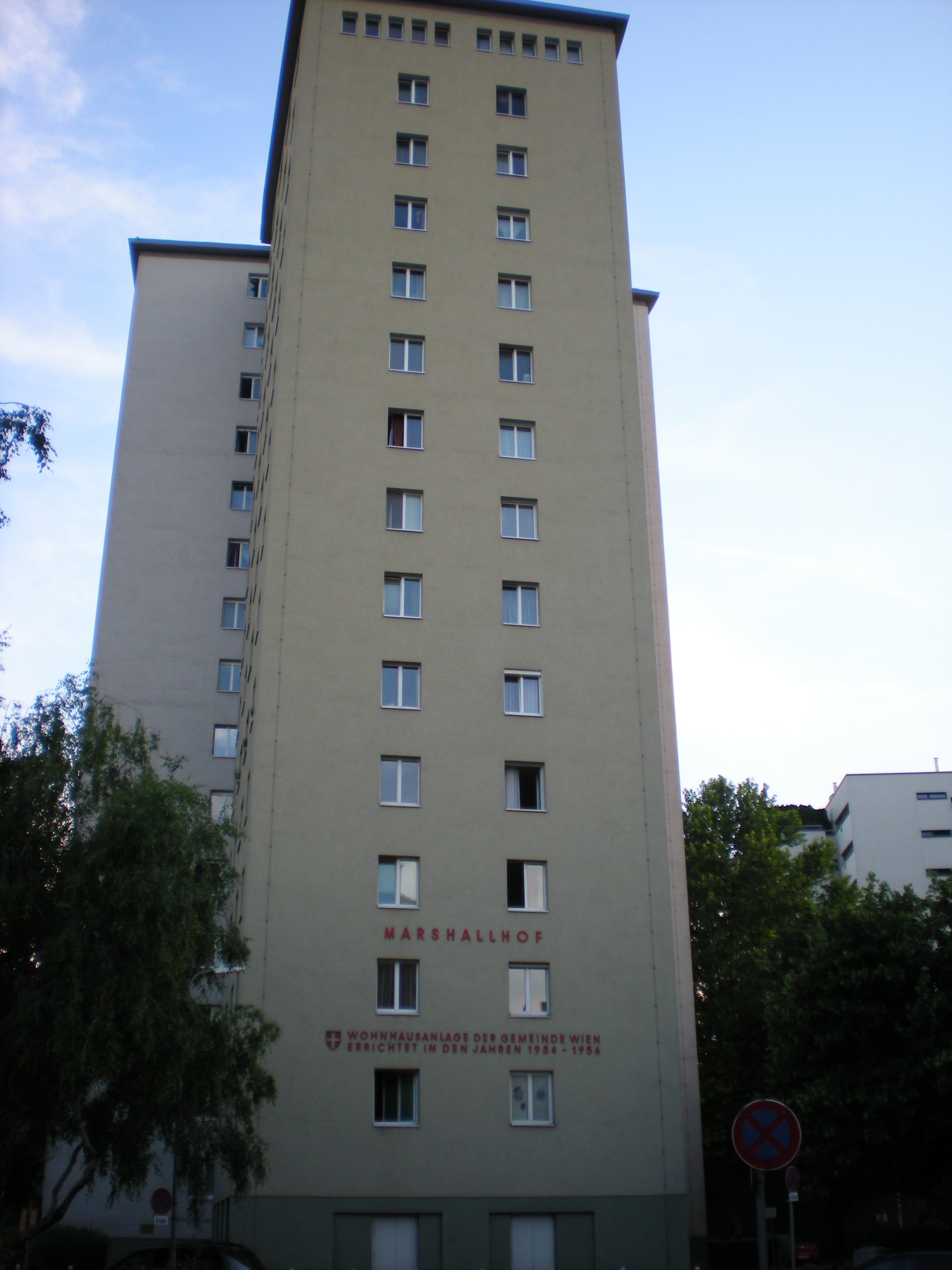
An apartment building in the Marshallhof complex, Vienna, Austria

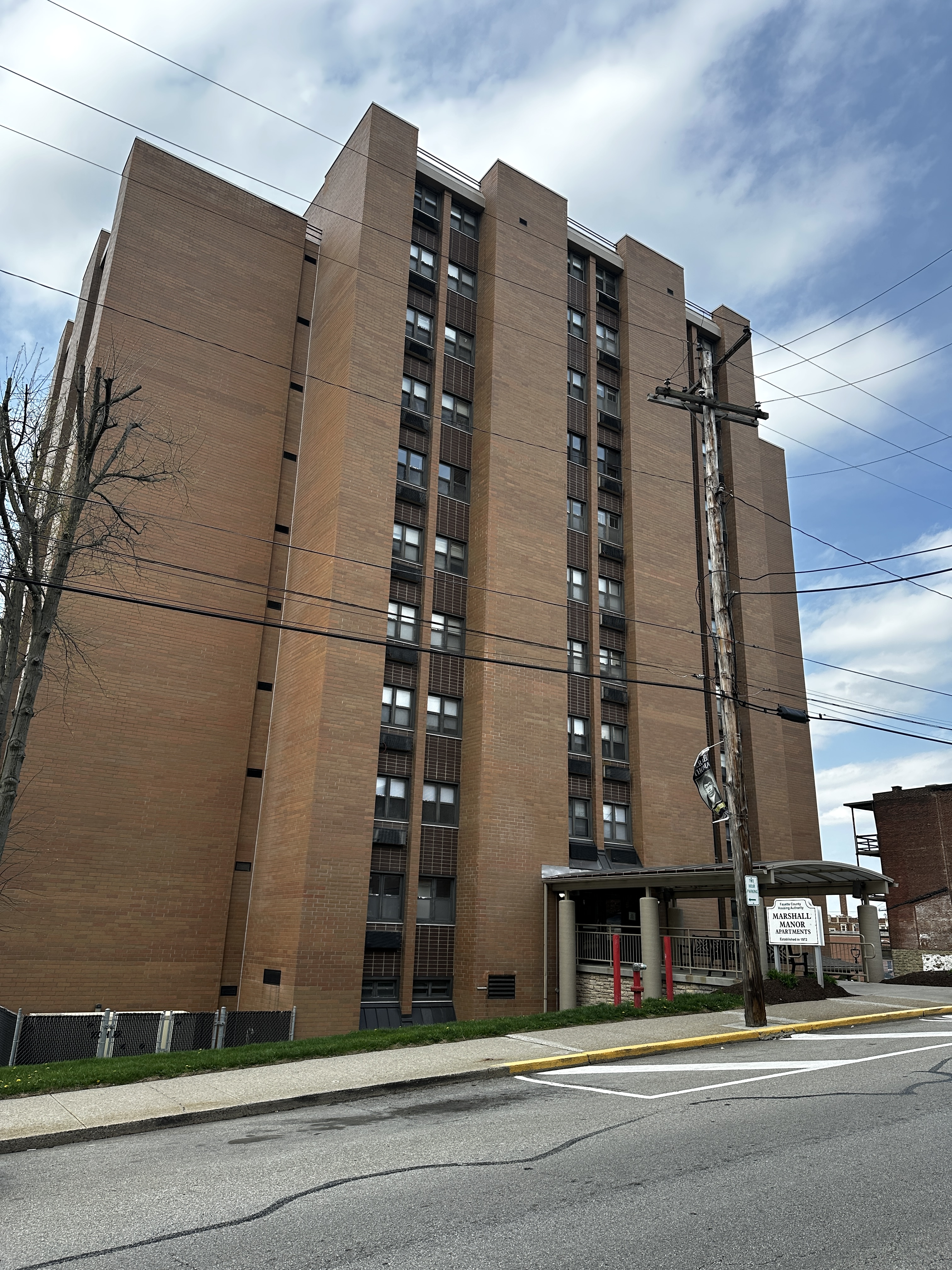
Marshall Manor senior housing apartment building in Uniontown, Pennsylvania

== Other ==
- George C. Marshall Center, a suite of ten room within the Hôtel de Talleyrand in Paris, France in which the American Administration of the Marshall Plan was headquartered.
- George Catlett Marshall Arch, an entranceway into cadet barracks at the Virginia Military Institute. Dedicated on May 15, 1951.
- George C. Marshall Chapter of the Military Officers Association of America in Lexington, Virginia.
- George C. Marshall Corridor, a hallway in the Pentagon with an exhibit on General Marshall.
- George-Marshall-Platz, a public square in Erlangen, Germany. Opened on July 29, 2011.
- General George C. Marshall Room, a meeting room in the Hampton Inn Uniontown.
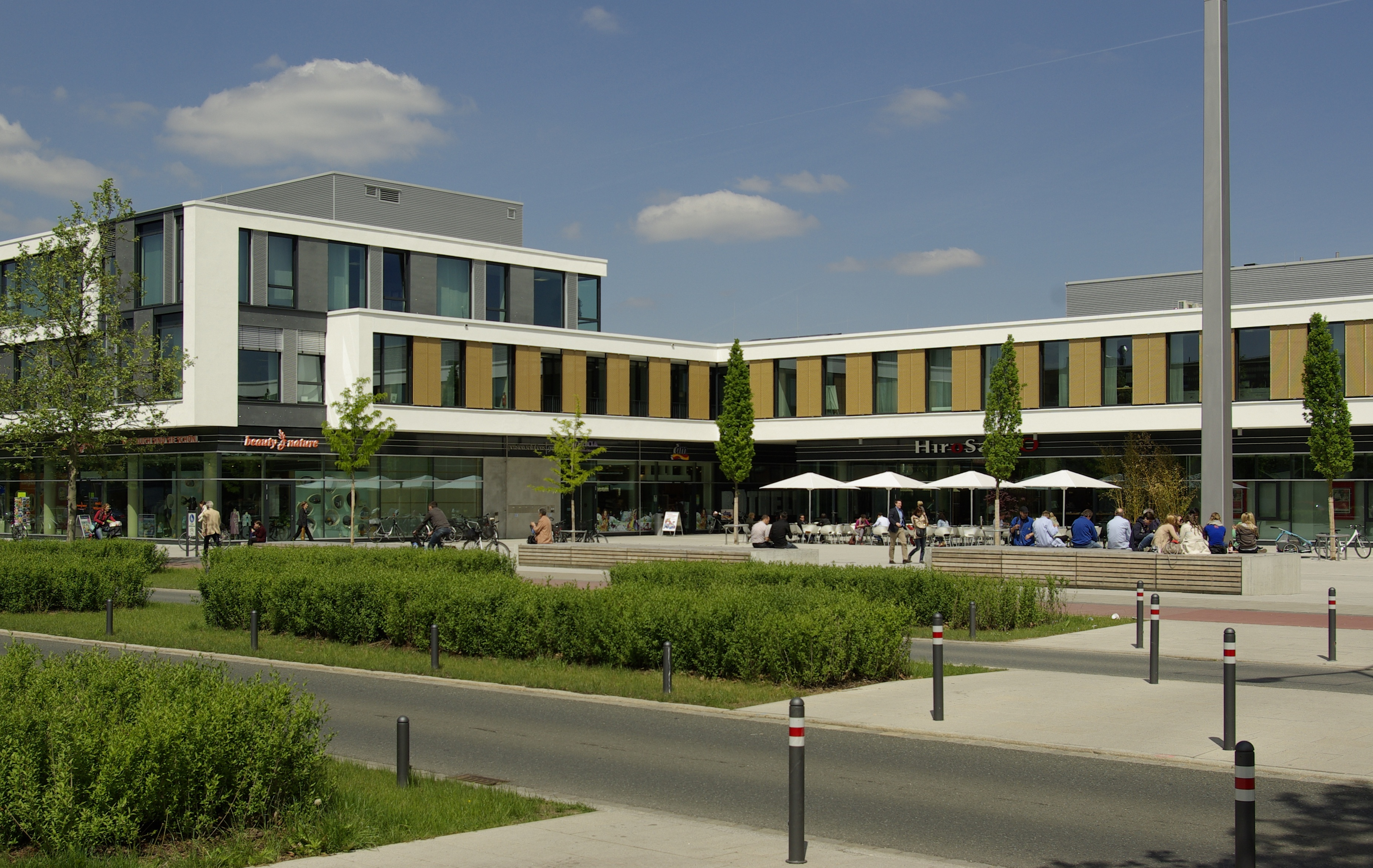
  George-Marshall-Platz in Erlangen, Germany
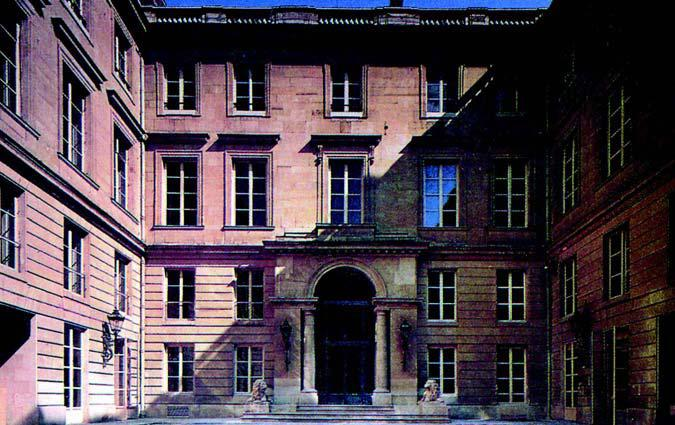
  The Hôtel de Talleyrand in Paris, France

== See also ==
- List of memorials to Dwight D. Eisenhower
- List of places named for Douglas MacArthur
- List of places named for George S. Patton
- List of memorials to Franklin D. Roosevelt
