= List of places named for George S. Patton =

George S. Patton, United States Army General, is remembered for his services in many places. This is a list of schools, roads and parks that are among those that have been named in his honor.

== Museums ==
- General George Patton Museum at Fort Knox, Kentucky. Also known as the Patton Museum of Cavalry and Armor and the General George Patton Museum of Leadership.
- General George S. Patton Memorial Museum, is located at the site of the Desert Training Center in Chiriaco Summit, California. A statue of Patton can be seen from nearby Interstate 10.
- Patton Memorial Pilsen museum in Plzeň, Czech Republic.
- General Patton Memorial Museum Ettelbruck, Luxembourg

== Schools ==
- General George S. Patton School District, Riverdale, Illinois
- George S. Patton Elementary School, Garden Grove, California
- General Patton Elementary School Dýšina, Czech Republic
- General George S. Patton School (K-8), Riverdale, Illinois
- Patton Junior High School at Fort Leavenworth, Kansas
- George S. Patton High School, Harbor City, California

== Buildings ==
- General George S. Patton Memorial Center, Detroit, Michigan
- Patton Army Air Field, Camp Arifjan, Kuwait
- Patton Barracks, Heidelberg, Germany, headquarters of the United States Army Garrison Heidelberg
- Patton Hall, an officer's classroom building at the U.S. Army Armor School at Fort Benning, Georgia.
- Patton Hall, Fort Riley, Kansas, headquarters of the installation Judge Advocate General
- Patton Hall, Officers' Club at Fort Myer, Virginia
- Patton Hall, Shaw AFB, South Carolina, headquarters of the 3rd United States Army
- Patton Hall, military hangar at the Saumur Armour Museum on loan from the French Armoured Corps and Cavalry School, Saumur, France, formerly used as a tank-restoration hall.
- Patton Reserve Center, Bell, California
- 1220 Patton Court, San Marino, California, former residence of the Patton family. The house is a private residence and is not open to the public.

== Statues ==
- Patton Monument, designed by sculptor James Earle Fraser and dedicated in 1950
- Patton Monument, Lacy Park, San Marino, CA
- General Patton Memorial, Avranches, France.
- General Patton Monument, Bastogne, Belgium
- A statue of General Patton was unveiled in Dýšina, Czech Republic to commemorate the 60th anniversary of the liberation of Czechoslovakia
- Boston, Massachusetts, The standing portrait statue of Patton, designed by sculptor James Earle Fraser, was installed at the Charles River Esplanade along the Hatch Shell Circle in 1953. The 8-foot (2.4 m) tall bronze statue depicts a uniformed Patton raising a pair of binoculars up to his eyes, atop a 4-foot (1.2 m) pink granite base.

== Streets ==
- General Patton Avenue, Shreveport, Louisiana; Murfreesboro, Tennessee
- General Patton Boulevard, Mandeville, Louisiana
- Patton Court, San Marino, California
- Patton Street, Houston, Texas; Dearborn, Michigan
- Patton Lane, Closter, New Jersey
- North Patton Street, Springfield, Illinois
- General George Patton Drive, Franklin, Tennessee; Brentwood, Tennessee; Des Plaines, Illinois; Chicago, Illinois
- George Patton Drive, San Antonio, Texas
- George Patton Lane, El Paso, Texas
- General George Patton Road, Nashville, Tennessee
- General Patton Street, Hammond, Louisiana; Lake Charles, Louisiana; Morgan City, Louisiana; Jackson, Mississippi; Pascagoula, Mississippi; Fort Drum, New York
- George Patton Street, Orangeburg, South Carolina
- Patton Way, San Marino, California
- Place du Général Patton, Paris, France (next to Avenue de la Grande Armée). Some 10 other French towns and cities, including Avranches, Thionville, Troyes and Le Mans, have a "Place du Général Patton" in his honor.
- Rue Patton, Seine-Port, France
- Avenue du Général Patton, Melun, Maxéville, France
- Rue de l'Armée Patton, Nancy, France
- Rue Du Général Patton, Arlon in the province of Luxembourg, Belgium; Ixelles, Brussels; Châteaubriant, France; and Lorraine, France
- Général-George-S.-Patton (avenue), Rennes, France (formerly Chemin vicinal n°25)
- General-Patton-Straße, Bad Tölz, Germany
- Place du Général Patton, Bastogne, Belgium
- Patton Road, Redstone Arsenal, Huntsville, Alabama; Wyndmoor, Pennsylvania; Devens, Massachusetts
- Patton Boulevard, Moses Lake, Washington
- Generaal Pattonlaan, Eindhoven, the Netherlands
- Boulevard du General Patton, Luxembourg, Luxembourg 2316
- Rua General Patton, Santa Amélia, 31555-420 Belo horizonte, Minas Gerais, Brazil.

== Other ==
- The Patton series of tanks is named for him.
- Pattonville, Germany, former US Military installation, now neighbourhood near Ludwigsburg
- Patton Golf Course, an 18-hole regulation length public golf course at the Fort Benning Golf Club, Fort Benning, Georgia.
- General George S Patton Park Recreation Center, a 93-acre park in Detroit, Michigan, dedicated in the early 1950s.
- Patton Range, a rifle and machine gun firing range at Fort Benning, Georgia
- A chapter of the Sons of the American Revolution is named for Patton.
- General George S Patton Polish Legion of American Veterans (P.L.A.V.) Post #11, Detroit, Michigan
- Patton was named the class exemplar for the United States Air Force Academy's class of 2005, the only non-aviator to receive this honor.
- At the Episcopal Church of Our Savior in San Gabriel, California, there is a stained glass window depicting Patton as a version of Saint George. He is shown in a tank fighting a dragon festooned with swastikas. The lettering in the window reads "I fought a good fight." The Wilson-Patton family members are buried in the San Gabriel Cemetery about 120 yards to the west of the Church, including the patriarch, Benjamin (Don Benito) Wilson. The exception is General Patton, buried in Luxembourg.
- Hamilton, Massachusetts, where Patton's summer home was located, dedicated its central park to Patton, boasting a World War II–era tank in the center of town, and the town's school sports teams play under the name "Generals." In addition, the French government gave two statues to the town commemorating Patton's service to their nation. They were improved in 2003 and sit at the entrance to Patton Park.
- Patton wrote much material, including speeches, lectures, and poetry. Incorporating the biblical phrase "Through a Glass, Darkly" he composed a poem imbued with his personal interpretations of reincarnation.
- General Patton bridge in Plzeň, Czech Republic. Main bridge in town over the river Mže, bridge is located near the Patton Memorial Pilsen museum.
- A Golden Palm Star in Patton's honor was dedicated in 2016 at the Walk of Stars in Palm Springs, California.
- Pattons Hage, a meadow in Uppsala, Sweden. During his visit to Sweden in 1945 he and prince Gustav Adolf were guests at a military exercise in the area and afterwards gathered in a meadow that is now named after him.
