= Torpedo defense =

Naval warfare tactics and countermeasures

Torpedo defense concerns the entire field of strategies, tactics, and practices which are intended to thwart the combat effectiveness of torpedoes. Torpedoes are subsurface naval weapons whose movement is limited to the underwater environment. As such, torpedoes are generally intended for attacking naval assets - broadly separated into surface ships, submarines, and potentially other waterborne assets (coastal installations such as floating docks, floating oil platforms, bridge foundations). The strategies for torpedo defense can dramatically differ for these categories, and the specific constituents thereof.

Such strategies include stealth, evasive maneuvers, passive defense like torpedo belts, torpedo nets, torpedo bulges, and sonar torpedo sensors, "soft-kill" active countermeasures like sonar decoys and sonar jammers, and "hard-kill" active defenses, like anti-torpedo torpedoes similar in idea to missile defense systems. Surface Ship Torpedo Defense and Countermeasure Anti-Torpedo systems are highly experimental and the US Navy ended trials on them in 2018.

As stated, defenses can be broadly classed as passive, active, and stealth-based. Strategies can be classed as reactive (undertaken after an enemy torpedo launch) and proactive (also known as nonreactive, undertaken before an enemy torpedo launch). Further, the interdiction of a torpedo can be either classed as a soft kill or a hard kill. Soft kill refers to a partial or total reduction of the weapon's combat effectiveness, such as by distracting it with countermeasures or causing it to waste time until its propulsion system runs out of mobile endurance. Hard kill refers to a physical incapacitation of the weapon with damage.

As with all other defensive measures, torpedo defense falls under the categorization of the "survivability onion". The first lines of defense are always stealth and distance, ideally beyond any hope of engagement by the enemy. Secondary to these are speed and agility, the capacity to evade. These also include the emerging field of hard-kill countermeasures, which are kinetic interceptors designed to destroy or incapacitate the incoming torpedoes. The final lines of defense are various designs of armor, sheer size and bulk which can shrug off localized damage, and resiliency modifications such as distributed flotation compartments.

== Stealth ==
Stealth is one of the most effective ways to thwart a torpedo attack. It is the primary defensive asset of submarines, who rely upon it in order to survive. To that end, submarines can employ radical stealth-augmenting measures such as covering the entire hull in anechoic tiles and reducing self-noise to a minimum. By contrast, surface vessels are easily detected and tracked with electromagnetic signals, visually, and acoustically. The advantage of depth is greatest in regions of the ocean which are beyond the continental shelf, where sonar return from the ocean floor is faint and distant, and submarines are capable of diving to their operating depth. Out in the open of the high seas, where terrain cannot be used, stealth can be provided by other vessels; the noise and acoustic shadow of a vessel's hull can conceal a warship or submarine behind or beneath it. Acoustic homing torpedoes can be misled by other acoustic signatures which are audible to them. To this end, moving target simulators and noisemakers are employed. Maneuvers which generate acoustic anomalies (knuckles and vortices) can be an effective last-ditch defense against primitive acoustic homing torpedoes, but are largely useless against more advanced seeker heads which possess anti-countermeasure systems.

Changing the vehicle's depth grants the ability to pass through thermal layers, take advantage of acoustic shadows (regions of which sound waves tend to curve around), and conceal the vehicle's acoustic signature against nearby surfaces which mostly or partially reflect sound (the sea floor, the sea surface, thermal layers). The vehicle's acoustic signature can also be concealed by noise. Natural ambient noise during rough seas, other nearby vessels, active noisemakers, and noise sources which directly overlap the vehicle's signature (such as a running torpedo or mobile noise simulator directly inline with the hostile acoustic receiver) all contribute to such concealment. Modern computerized sonar, capable of isolating a frequency spectrum from a multiplexed acoustic signal, is far more difficult (or downright impossible) to trick with layered noise. If an attacker is actively guiding the weapon with a wire, especially when the wire also communicates sounds locally heard by the seeker head to the attacker, it is far more difficult to use stealth to defend against the incoming torpedo.

== Speed ==
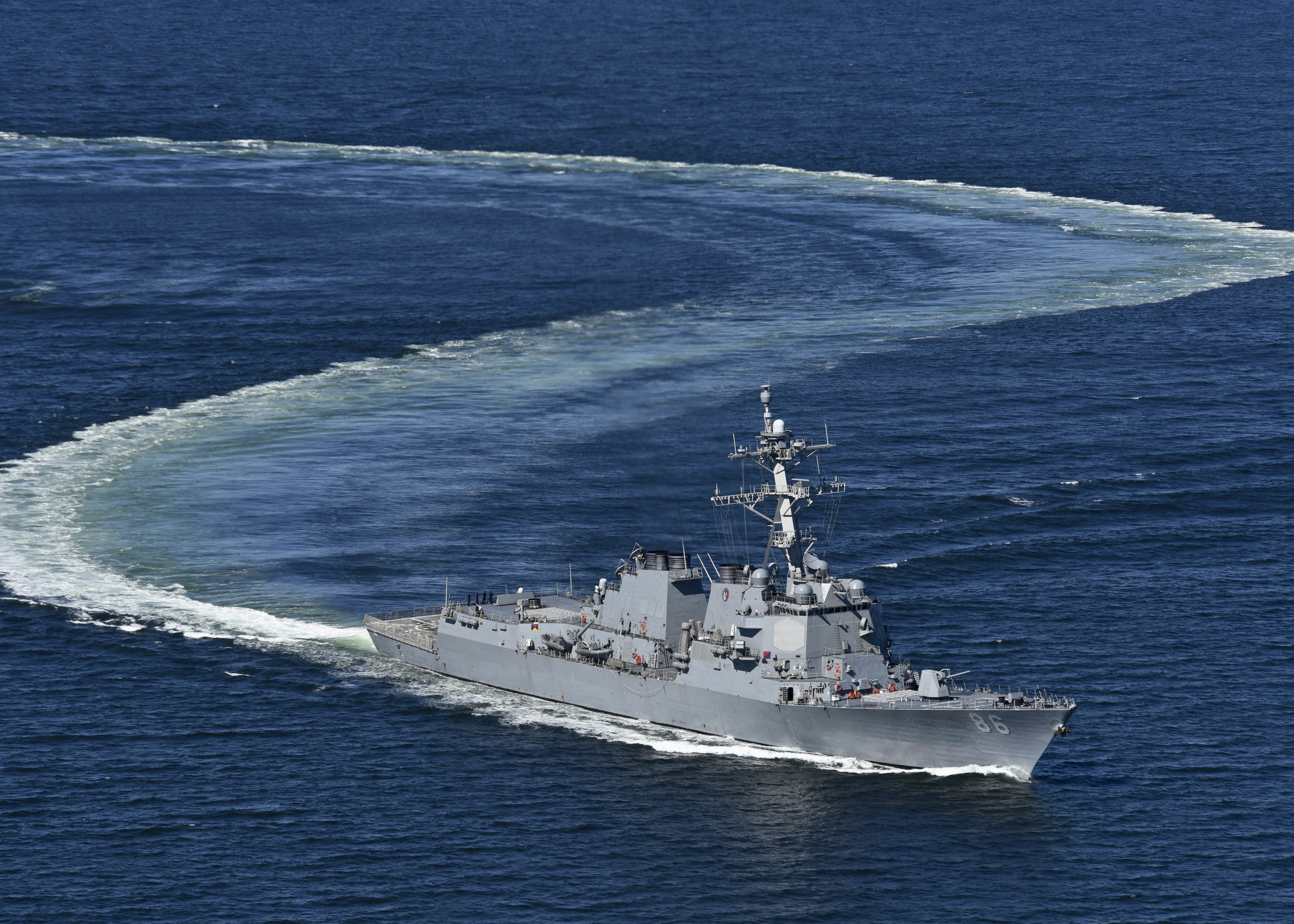
USS Shoup, an Arleigh Burke-class destroyer, engaged in a torpedo evasion exercise in 2016.

A vehicle's ability to move is among the simplest and most effective methods of defending against torpedoes, ever since the weapon's inception during the 19th century. For surface ships, reactive torpedo defense has consisted mainly of special high-speed maneuvers to avoid the inbound threat. If a torpedo is detected, it can be dodged, which means that the weapon also employs a measure of stealth in order to be functionally effective. This is especially true for torpedoes which are actually slower than the top speed of their targets. The original Whitehead torpedo of 1866 had a speed of a mere 7 kn (13 km/h), slower than basically all steam-powered vessels of its era. The German G7e torpedo, employed in great numbers during the Second World War, had a top speed of 30 kn (56 km/h); homing versions of the same weapon lowered that to approximately 25 kn (46 km/h) since the weapon's seeker head was incapable of hearing the target at higher speeds. The G7e TIIId "Dackel" variant of the same was even slower, moving at 9 kn (17 km/h) in exchange for greatly increased endurance, since it was optimized for attacking convoys using a ladder search pattern. The Royal Navy Mark 20 Bidder torpedo, which remained in service until the late 1980s, had a speed of 20 kn (37 km/h) - this was slower than practically all surface warships, and even many civilian vessels. Against a weapon of this kind, escaping in a straight line would have been an effective strategy. Detection of an incoming weapon is paramount to evasion. The use of electric propulsion, or thermal propulsion which did not leave a surface bubble trail - such as the Japanese Type 93 or Type 95 - specifically served to thwart the target's capacity to detect the approach of the weapon.

=== Straight-running torpedoes ===
Torpedoes which run in a straight line are the oldest type, tracing their heritage back to the earliest specimens produced by Whitehead. These torpedoes run in a straight line, as best as their guidance systems allow. Straight-running torpedoes were the primary type used up until the end of the Second World War in 1945. Earlier propulsion technologies such as compressed air and compressed steam would leave a visible trail of bubbles on the surface; more advanced technologies, such as electric propulsion and high-test peroxide engines would not emit a surface trail. The emergence of advanced sonar technology has rendered straight-running torpedoes mostly obsolete, due to the great ease with which they can be dodged if their location and course can be determined. There are some modern examples of straight-running torpedoes which remained viable against surface targets during the Cold War, such as the RN Mark VIII (in service 1927–1993), the USN Mark 14 (in service 1933–1980), the JMSDF Type 72 (in service 1972–1994), and the Russian VA-111 Shkval (in service 1977–present). The Shkval was originally an exclusively straight-running design, but is no longer such: it runs straight at high speed, then switches to a speed of approximately 40 kn (74 km/h) and activates an acoustic seeker head.

Straight-running torpedoes remain entirely viable against targets which are defenseless (e.g. civilian vessels), motionless (e.g. vessels at anchor), or both (e.g. floating docks, oil platforms, harbor infrastructure). By their nature, straight-running torpedoes would be cheaper and easier to manufacture than ones with sophisticated guidance.

In order to defend against straight-running torpedoes, it is crucial to determine their location and direction of travel, at least approximately. If the torpedoes have been launched from a great distance, even a slight change in the speed or direction of travel of the target vessel can cause them to miss. Traveling perpendicular to the direction of the torpedoes' movement can be the quickest way to evade them; alternatively, traveling parallel to the torpedoes may be the viable course of action, if there are multiple incoming torpedoes in a spread or fan pattern. Such tactics were employed during the Second World War. If the torpedoes have been launched from a short distance, such as from a torpedo boat attacking a larger vessel, depending on the circumstances, little to nothing can be done. Maneuvers can be undertaken to affect the location of the impact, or potentially cause the impact to be at an acute angle, potentially causing the torpedo to malfunction and not detonate. Inertial fuzes cannot be thwarted with a glancing impact.

Straight-running torpedoes are almost totally useless against submarines, since such torpedoes are designed to operate at a single depth only, or at most two depths - the depth at launch, and a subsequent activation depth. They are almost totally dedicated for use against surface targets. Paradoxically, the only historically acknowledged sinking of one submarine by another while both were submerged (see: sinking of U-864) was with straight-running torpedoes.

=== Pattern-running torpedoes ===
Historical examples of pattern-running torpedoes of the Second World War employed a ladder search pattern in order to facilitate lobbing a number of torpedoes at an enormous target, one much bigger than a solitary vessel, i.e. a convoy. The same strategies employed against straight-running torpedoes would have been effective, once the movement pattern was understood. In a modern sense, virtually all torpedoes possess acoustic homing, and their capacity to run a pattern (usually a circle or snake) is used in conjunction with homing to search for a target. In this sense, pattern-running torpedoes in the contemporary sense are a subtype of homing torpedoes, and the same strategies for defending against those would be applicable.

== Soft-kill countermeasures ==
Soft-kill torpedo countermeasures include a variety of decoys and jammers designed to deceive or disrupt the tracking systems of acoustic torpedoes. These countermeasures can be towed, stationary, or self-propelled, and typically rely on acoustic signals, magnetic signatures, or bubble screens to mislead incoming weapons. Such countermeasures include:

- Bubble decoys: Create reflective noise via chemical or gas discharge (e.g., Bold, Sieglinde).
- Sonar jammers: Saturate acoustic sensors with disruptive noise (e.g., Siegmund, ADC).
- Signature decoys: Simulate ship acoustics or magnetic fields to lure torpedoes away (e.g., Foxer, Fanfare, Nixie, Maareech, MG-series).
- Mobile/swimming decoys: Self-propelled, often reusable systems simulating ship movement (e.g., Rafael's SCUTTER Mk 3, MOSS).
- Integrated systems: Combine sensors, jammers, and decoys in one suite (e.g., Leonardo C30/S, Ultra SSTD, Rafael's Torbuster).

== Hard-kill countermeasures ==
Hard Kill Countermeasure anti-Torpedo (CAT) systems are generally divided into two categories: Antitorpedo Mines (ATM) and Anti-Torpedo-Torpedoes (ATT). Both types rely on Torpedo Detection, Classification, and Localization (TDCL) systems to identify incoming threats. E.g.

=== Torpedo detection, classification and localisation (TDCL): ===
- Ultra Electronics DCL Technology Demonstrator programme
- Surface Ship Torpedo Defence
- Rafael's BlackFish/MonkFish HMS (DSIT)

Anti-torpedo-torpedo (ATT) systems:

- Rafael's TORBUSTER a fourth-generation torpedo defense countermeasure developed by Rafael Advanced Defense Systems. Designed to neutralize incoming torpedoes in both shallow and deep water, it combines soft- and hard-kill capabilities.
- The U.S. Navy's Countermeasure Anti-Torpedo Torpedo (CAT), developed by Penn State's Applied Research Laboratory. The CAT system was designed to counter wake-homing torpedoes, which detect a ship's wake rather than its acoustic signature. The CAT torpedo operates autonomously after launch with “fire-and-forget” capability, using onboard sensors to search, target, and maneuver against threats. Developed under a high-priority program, CAT was produced within 24 months through extensive simulation-based design and modular construction, reducing costs significantly compared to legacy torpedoes. It was first deployed aboard the USS George H.W. Bush in 2013 and subsequently installed on additional vessels.
- The SeaSpider ATT system by ATLAS ELEKTRONIK has undergone successful live-fire trials. These tests involved detection and localization of incoming Mk 37-derived autonomous underwater vehicles (AUVs) and DM2A3 torpedoes using passive and active TDCL sonar systems. Upon detection, the SeaSpider interceptor was launched from an above-water launcher to intercept threats at their closest point of approach, with successful intercepts confirmed through acoustic and optical means.

=== Antitorpedo mines (ATM) ===
- ATM systems are considered a low-cost, broad-spectrum defense solution. These systems deploy neutrally buoyant mines into a ship's stern wake, where they maintain depth and detect incoming torpedoes using acoustic and magnetic sensors. The mines then detonate to disrupt torpedoes following predictable paths.
- In addition, the RBU-1000 anti-submarine rocket launcher is alleged to have anti-torpedo capability.

== Armor ==
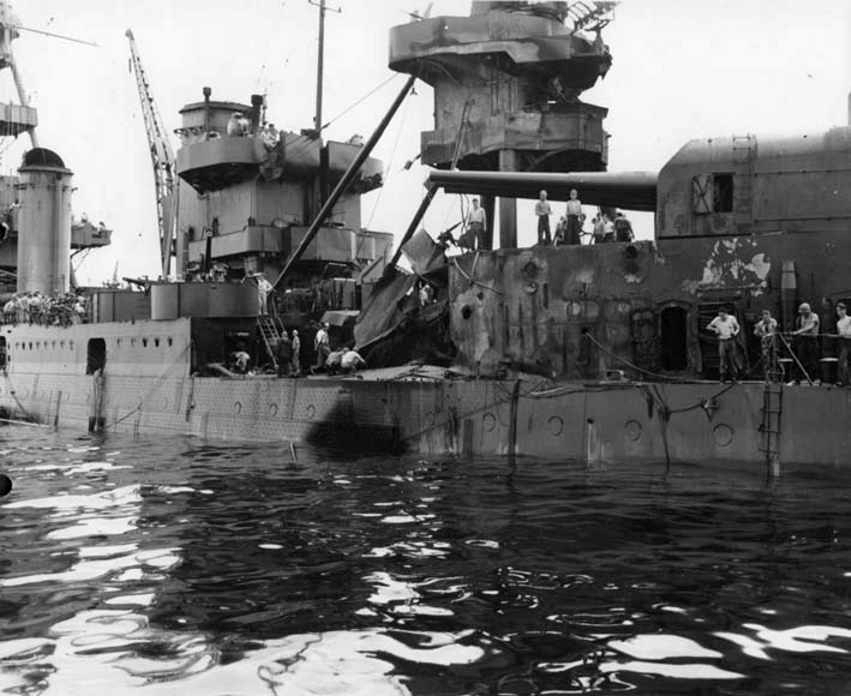
USS Pensacola at Tulagi in 1942, significantly flooded but afloat and mobile after an impact by a Type 93 torpedo during the Battle of Tassafaronga. The attack claimed the lives of 125 men and injured 68.

Armor, especially spaced armor, was one of the oldest answers to the torpedo threat, developing alongside the weapon since it began to be taken seriously during the 19th century. Due to the great destructive power of a torpedo's warhead, it was not realistically possible to escape penetration after impact and detonation.

=== Anti-torpedo nets ===
The concept of dedicated anti-torpedo armor emerged in the 1870s as the Whitehead torpedo rapidly advanced and the torpedo boat was invented. In 1876, the British Admiralty Torpedo Committee came up with multiple ideas for deterring torpedoes, which included iron nets projected by spars, hanging like a shroud around the hull of the thus-equipped warship. The most successful of these designs consisted of galvanized iron wire rings, 8 in (20 cm) in diameter, interlocked together like chainmail. Experiments were conducted in 1877, with HMS Thunderer becoming the first operational ship to be fitted with the nets. Other ideas included patrols of picket boats around the fleet, electric searchlights with focusable beams which can be pointed in any direction, and a machine gun armament.

Nets presented multiple drawbacks, which caused them to all but disappear from warship designs after the First World War. The worst drawback was significant turbulence in the water, which dramatically slowed down the equipped vessels. In 1915, a report from HMS Agamemnon (Note: In the source text, erroneously claimed as HMS Armageddon; no such ship existed. HMS Agamemnon is the closest match.) - a warship with a nominal top speed of 18 kn (33 km/h) - stated that with the nets deployed, their top speed was barely 6 kn (11 km/h). Nets, when furled, caused cosmetic damage to the warship's hull, scraping away paint and exposing the hull to rust. There were also problems with spar deployment and retraction, with nets occasionally failing to retract. During the Second World War, nets were frequently relegated to protecting sheltered anchorages from torpedo attacks, as well as trespassing by enemy submarines, human torpedoes, and frogmen. The effectiveness of nets against torpedoes is obvious and self-evident, and they could potentially even interdict contemporary homing torpedoes, if actually struck. Nets figured for a long time as harbor defenses; as mobile defenses carried by warships, the Royal Navy was the most prolific in their employment. Significantly, the United States Navy never used anti-torpedo nets.

=== Spaced armor ===
Spaced armor in the context of torpedo protection is designed to increase the resiliency of a vessel once it is successfully hit by a torpedo. By the nature of the weapon, it damages its target below the waterline, which simultaneously targets a vessel in its least armored region, and directly attacks the vessel's capacity to remain afloat.

The earliest form of dedicated anti-torpedo spaced armor was the proposal of the double hull in 1884 by Sir Edward Reed. This was not adopted in its pure form, since sacrificing internal hull volume was objectionable, but subsequent warship designs relocated the coal bunkers to the periphery of the hull in order to have dual functionality as anti-flooding bulkheads with explicit consideration of the torpedo threat. Later, during the 1910s, warships progressively switched to fuel oil, which made double hulls much more feasible and desirable. Oil-filled compartments could be placed anywhere, and seawater could be used to fill these compartments as they were gradually depleted, functioning both as ballast and absorbing the energy of a warhead blast.

By the preamble to the First World War, torpedo warheads became massively destructive, both in terms of warhead filler mass and the replacement of the earlier guncotton with superior fillers such as TNT and picric acid. For example, the British 21-inch Mark II carried an optional payload of 400 lb (180 kg) of TNT, the German G6AV carried 441 lb (200 kg) of a TNT/HND mixture, and the Japanese 21-inch Type 43 carried 330 lb (150 kg) of Shimose. This prompted the design of dedicated torpedo bulkheads. By the 1930s, warheads became even more massive, and by then all featured advanced high explosives: the British 21-inch Mark VIII carried 722 lb (327 kg) of Torpex, the German G7e carried 620 lb (280 kg) of aluminum-augmented TNT/HND (Schießwolle 36), and the Japanese Type 95 carried 893 lb (405 kg) of TNT/HND (Type 97). Bulkhead designs became more elaborate, incorporating multiple layers, and the defensive bulkheads were organized into a fully dedicated torpedo belt, particularly motivated by the 1922 Washington Naval Treaty which restricted warship tonnage; flooded ballast tanks and empty voids did not count toward the limit. One of the most advanced designs was the Pugliese torpedo defense system introduced in the early 1930s, intended to protect the warship against warheads of as much as 770 lb (350 kg) of payload. The design incorporated a series of internal drum-like cavities, oriented athwartship inside the torpedo bulkhead, surrounded by fuel or seawater ballast. Upon sustaining a blast, the affected internal cavities were expected to implode and thus absorb the energy of the blast.

The most visually prominent integrated spaced armor feature was the anti-torpedo bulge. The bulge was externally mounted and conformal to the hull, well-suited for addition to older warships as a modification. Hollow sponsons were mounted longitudinally alongside the hull, below the waterline. The feature was introduced in 1914, as a refit, on the Edgar-class protected cruisers designed by the British Director of Naval Construction, Eustace Tennyson-d'Eyncourt.

=== Resiliency modifications ===
Beyond dedicated protection schemes is the basic flotation of the vessel. The larger the vessel, the more robust it is against torpedo attack. Hull subdivisions localize flooding and are a feature of vessels intended to ameliorate floodability in general. A reinforced keel, with a double bottom which is not directly attached to it, can help avoid the keel being broken by an explosion of a proximity-fuzed torpedo below the hull. A below-the-keel explosion is generally difficult to defend against, and efforts are best directed to other approaches, such as detection and evasion of the incoming weapon. In order to avoid disabling damage to the narrower ends of a vessel, which are the least protected by spaced armor due to their shape, skegs can be used to retain functional shape (but not flotation) and thereby vessel mobility after a weapon hit, especially when it concerns the protection of rudders and propeller shafts. Flotation fillings can also be used as a makeshift measure; lumber and loose wooden crates were used to this extent, in order to retain some portion of buoyancy in flooded compartments after a hit. USS Santee, a Q-ship during the First World War, was torpedoed in 1917 while filled with wood flotation filler. The scheme worked, allowing the vessel to return to port in an awash condition.

An extreme example of maximized resiliency was the abortive Project Habakkuk aircraft carrier project, constructed (or more accurately, grown) out of Pykrete, a composite of ice and wood pulp. The projected design had a "torpedo-proof" hull thickness of 40 ft (12 m), which would have allowed it to quite simply shrug off damage inflicted by the weapons; blast craters could be patched up with more Pykrete. The overall concept became known as a bergship, a navigable iceberg-like vessel, which achieves flotation with its distributed bulk rather than large displacement cavities inside its hull.

== See also ==
Detection equipment:

- Towed array sonar
- Towed pinger locator

Towed decoys:

- AN/SLQ-25 Nixie – towed decoy that emits signals to draw a torpedo away from its intended target.
- T-Mk 6 Fanfare – early towed decoy employed during the Second World War.

Related topic:

- Defense against swimmer incursions
