= Sonar decoy =

Device to distract sonar operators

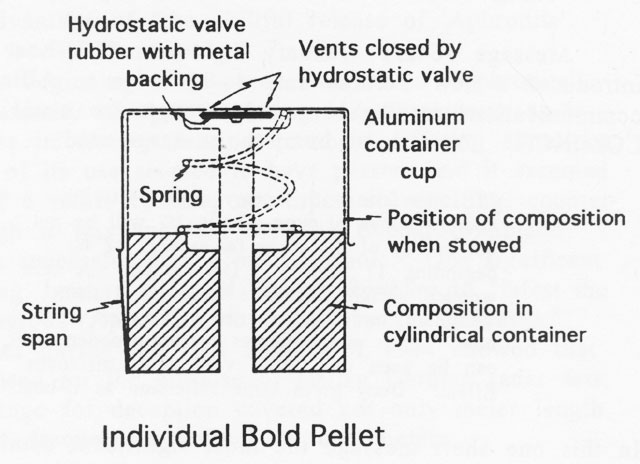
Bold decoy pellet

A sonar decoy is a device for decoying sonar. One may be released from a submarine or a surface vessel. A decoy acts as false targets for human operators or sonar-homing weapons such as acoustic torpedoes. Many count as a type of torpedo defence.

== Submarine decoys ==
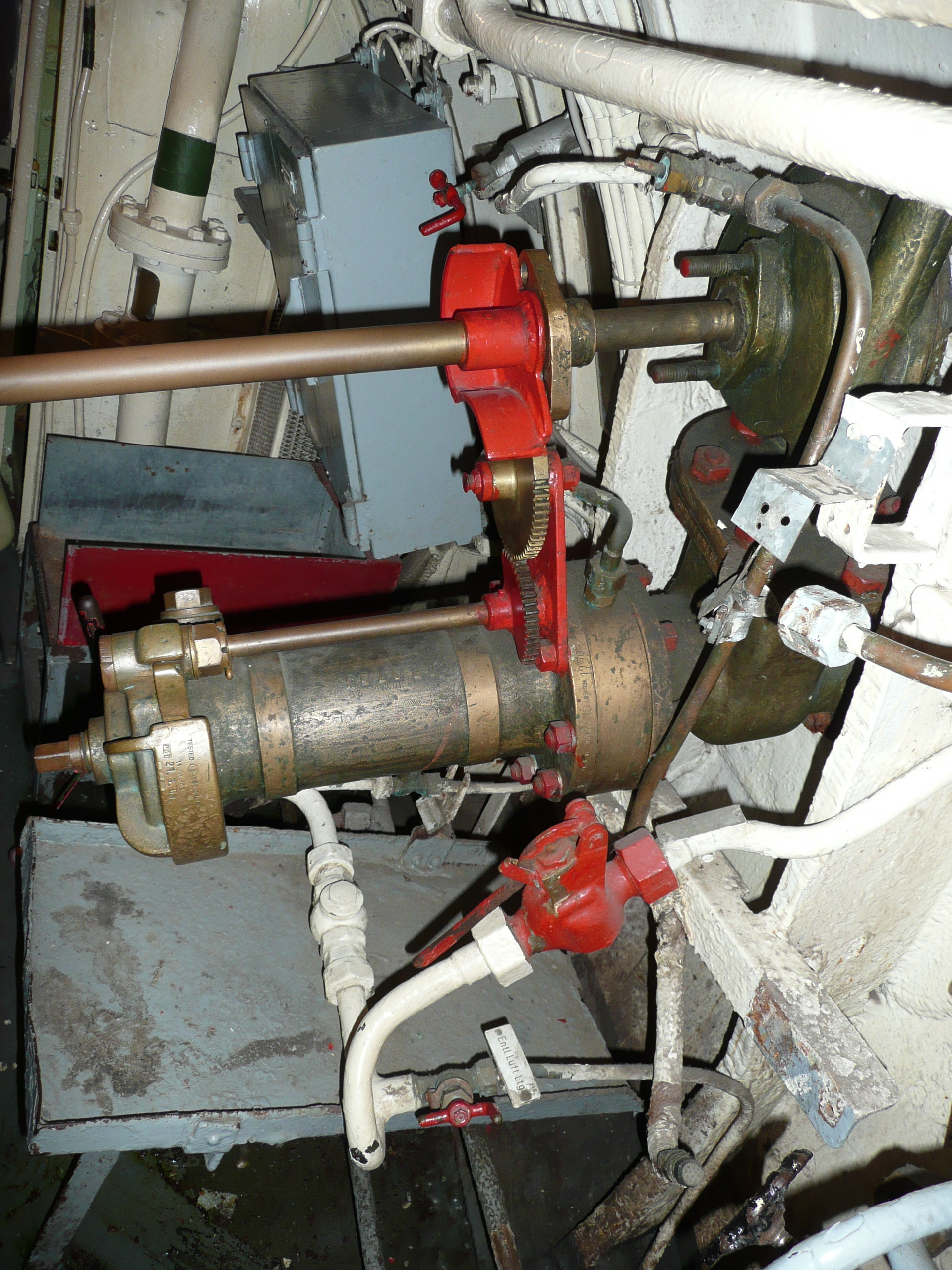
Bold launch tube, in the stern compartment of a type XXI U-boat

The first submarine decoys were the German Bold fitted to U-boats of World War II. These were a pellet of calcium hydride in a simple metal container. On contact with sea water, the calcium hydride decomposed to produce a trail of hydrogen gas bubbles that acted as a bubble curtain and reflected ASDIC impulses to produce a false target. The container trapped hydrogen and floated, with a crude spring valve to maintain buoyancy to keep it at a constant depth.

Later decoys, such as Sieglinde, were motorised and could deploy their false target away from the host submarine, increasing safety.

== Surface ship decoys ==
Decoys were also used by surface ships to decoy the developing acoustic torpedoes. These were usually towed behind the host.

== Example decoys ==
=== Bubble decoys ===
Reflective bubble targets that produce an active return

- Bold
- Sieglinde

=== Sonar jammers ===
- Siegmund - German "hammer and explosive decoy", intended to swamp the listening device with noise
- Acoustic Device Countermeasure (ADC) (US)

=== Signature decoys ===
- Foxer, a British towed decoy to decoy acoustic torpedoes away from surface ships. Also used by the US as FXR and the Canadians as CAT. Creates cavitation noises using water flow and metal banging noises (good-enough passive signature for the time).
- T-Mk 6 Fanfare. Towed, creates electrically-generated propeller noise (passive signature).
- AN/SLQ-25 Nixie - towed, active (since B variant) and passive
- Mobile submarine simulator - active and passive; swimming
- Maareech ATDS (India)
- Scutter (Israel)
- SCAD 102 (UK)
- MG-44 Korund-1 (Soviet) - swimming, active and passive; installed on Delta-class submarine (400 mm)
- MG-74 Korund-2 (Soviet) - swimming, active and passive; installed on Akula-class submarine (external "REPS-324 Shlagbaum" tubes) and Delta IV-class submarine (533 mm tubes)
- MG-104 Brosok, MG-114 Berill (Russia) - swimming, active and passive; installed on Akula-class submarine (external "REPS-324 Shlagbaum" tubes)

=== Combination ===
- Leonardo C30/S - combined jammer and moving signature decoy (Mobile Target Emulator)
- Ultra Electronics Next Generation Countermeasure - jammer, sensor, and signature decoy
- Ultra Electronics Surface Ship Torpedo Defence (SSTD) - sensor, jammer, decoy
- Ultra Electronics DCL Technology Demonstrator programme - sensor (passive AND active), hard-kill
- Rafael Torbuster - active/passive sonar decoy with hard-kill
- Vist-E (Russia) - jammer, active/passive decoy
