= Noel Black =

American film director

- Born: June 30, 1937; Chicago, Illinois, U.S
- Died: July 5, 2014 (aged 77); Santa Barbara, California, U.S.
- Occupation(s): Film and television director, film producer, screenwriter

Noel Black (June 30, 1937 – July 5, 2014) was an American film and television director, screenwriter, and producer.

Black was born in Chicago, Illinois. He won awards at the 1966 Cannes Film Festival for an 18-minute short subject filmed in 1965 called Skaterdater. It had no dialogue, but used music and sound effects to advance the plot. It was nominated for an Academy Award for Best Live Action Short Film in 1966.

He directed the 1968 cult film Pretty Poison, and subsequently concentrated on directing for television, occasionally directing films such as Private School.

As a screenwriter, he wrote the 1985 coming-of-age comedy Mischief, set in the 1950s.

Black died of bacterial pneumonia in Santa Barbara, California on July 5, 2014. He was 77.

== Early life and education ==
Black was born in Chicago on June 30, 1937. He received bachelor's and master's degrees in film from the University of California, Los Angeles.

== Career ==
Black was under the influence of the French New Wave. "I longed to be the American Godard and Truffaut", he said. "I had the best intentions, but the reality of the American film business kicked in. After I left UCLA, I was determined to storm the Bastille by making my way into the industry with a short film."

=== Skaterdater ===
Black wrote and directed the 18 minute film, Skaterdater (1965), which had no dialogue and was set in California. The short film was about a group of teenage boy skateboarders as well as the romance between one of them and a girl on a bicycle. Black raised $17,000 to make Skaterdater, which was shot with car and tricycle-mounted cameras. United Artists bought the short film for $50,000.

The short film garnered the Palme d'Or for Best Short Film at the 1966 Cannes Film Festival as well as a nomination for the Academy Award for Best Live Action Short Film at the 38th Oscar Ceremony (which it lost to Claude Berri's Le Poulet). Skaterdater drew the attention of executives at 20th Century Fox, who hired Black to direct Pretty Poison. "I didn’t begrudge UA the thousands they made from the short," Black commented. "It led to 20th Century-Fox giving me the chance to make Pretty Poison, on which I was given fairly free rein."

=== Pretty Poison ===
Black's directorial debut was Pretty Poison (1968), a black comedy film which starred Anthony Perkins and Tuesday Weld. The screenplay was written by Lorenzo Semple, Jr., and was based on the novel, She Let Him Continue (which was also the working title at the time), by Stephen Geller. Perkins plays a paroled arsonist who pretends to be a secret agent to win over a stunning blonde honors student, played by Weld. But despite a well-scrubbed facade, Weld's character is in fact a psychopath, and soon the pair are committing a string of crimes, including homicide.

It was Black who decided to cast Perkins in the film: "I saw Tony (Perkins) in Neil Simon's The Star-Spangled Girl on Broadway and thought he’d be ideal. I sent him the script, and he wanted to do it. I then met him for the first time at Joe Allen's after a performance of the play. He had enormous charm and intelligence, the very qualities I wanted to come through in the role he would be playing. I was looking for the young Tony of Friendly Persuasion and Fear Strikes Out, not Psycho, although commentators naturally made the comparison between Norman Bates and the character in Pretty Poison."

Black took 30 days to shoot at lush locations around Great Barrington, Massachusetts, in the autumn of 1967, with exactly one day in a studio for the scenes in the prison and an office. "While I was looking for the location in four states, I came across a lot of factories expelling worse things into rivers than shown in the film", Black recalled.

During production, Black and Weld reportedly did not get along with each other. She often refused to do what Black demanded of her and would break down and cry. "Don’t talk to me about (Pretty Poison)", she said, "I couldn’t bear Noel Black (the director) even speaking to me. When he said 'good morning,' it destroyed my day."

Some reviewers panned the film, and when it did poorly at the box office, 20th Century Fox pulled it from theatres. But after other critics rose to the film's defense, the studio soon rereleased it, and it found a cult following. "I don’t mind, especially as Pretty Poison is what people like to call 'a cult classic'", said Black. "Most of my few other features were done for money. I had two wives and two children to support." Pretty Poison was awarded the New York Film Critics Circle Award for Best Screenplay in 1968.

In 1969, Black spoke about his film to students at Boston University. "Essentially, we saw it as a story with many comedic elements in a serious framework — a kind of black comedy or existential humor of which Dr. Strangelove is a prototype", he said. "We hoped people would take it on more than one level."

The film was released on DVD in 2006 by 20th Century Fox Home Entertainment. "Lorenzo Semple Jr.'s screenplay is beautifully worked out, and the director, Noel Black, does a superb job of modulating the film's conflicting elements: the coming-of-age story and the thriller", Charles Taylor said in a New York Times review on the occasion of the film's DVD release, in 2006.

=== Cover Me Babe and Jennifer on My Mind ===
Black's next film, Cover Me Babe (1970), was about a film student who embraces the avant-garde. The film starred Sam Waterston, Sondra Locke and Robert Forster. Like Pretty Poison, Cover Me Babe was also released by 20th Century Fox.

The subsequent film Black directed afterwards was Jennifer on My Mind (1971), and its screenplay was written by Erich Segal, who was known for his novel, Love Story.

Both of these films were flops. "The gold-plated nail in my career coffin was pounded when, after the box-office failure of Pretty Poison, I accepted a dreadful project, Cover Me Babe, that never should have been made", Black remarked. "I reckoned that it was better to stay active than to wait for a project I believed in. That was a mistake. It was followed by another mistake, Jennifer on My Mind, one of the dozens of unsuccessful drug pictures at the time."

=== 1970s television work ===
"For five years after the two flops, I devoted myself to writing scripts", Black continued. "Finally in 1976, I decided to get back into directing through episodic television. The idea of it scared me because I had started in the film business at the top with my own feature."

Black went on to write scripts and direct television shows like Kojak and Quincy, M.E. in the mid-1970s. He also directed Ron Howard in an adaptation of Sherwood Anderson's I'm a Fool, which served as a 1977 episode for the PBS series, The American Short Story.

He also directed episodes of such other TV series as McCloud, The Hardy Boys/Nancy Drew Mysteries and Hawaii Five-O.

=== Marianne/Mirrors; A Man, a Woman, and a Bank; and Private School ===
Black attempted a return to the big screen in 1978 with a voodoo horror film initially titled Marianne. Having suffered editorial meddling and script changes, it remained unreleased for six years, until it appeared on video under the title Mirrors. The film stars Kitty Winn and Peter Donat.

Black officially returned to the big screen with A Man, a Woman, and a Bank (1979), a caper comedy film starring Donald Sutherland, Brooke Adams and Paul Mazursky. Roger Ebert wrote: "Since he made the legendary Pretty Poison in 1968, Black's career has drifted from TV assignments to obscure features and back again. He's never really been able to duplicate the freshness of that first success." The film was distributed by Avco Embassy.

Black also directed the sex comedy Private School (1983), starring Phoebe Cates and Matthew Modine. In her review of the film, The New York Times critic Janet Maslin mentioned that Pretty Poison earned Black a footnote in American film history, but "Private School won’t warrant another one."

=== 1980s and 90s television work ===
Black continued his television work by directing television films including: The Golden Honeymoon (1980) and The Hollow Boy (1991) for PBS; The Electric Grandmother (1982) for NBC; The Other Victim (1981), with William Devane, and Promises to Keep (1985), starring Robert Mitchum, for CBS.

In 1985, Black was the screenwriter and executive producer of Mischief, another teen sex comedy set in the 1950s.

He also directed episodes of the 1980s version of The Twilight Zone.

== Unrealized projects ==
=== The Adventures of Augie March ===
Immediately after Pretty Poison, Black co-wrote, with Fred Segal, a screen adaptation of Saul Bellow's The Adventures of Augie March, one of many projects that failed to come to fruition.

=== Railroad Bill biopic ===
Black was to have directed a biopic depicting the life of Railroad Bill, with Erich Segal as screenwriter.

=== Killer ===
In 1974, there was a vain possibility of making a film called Killer, written by Richard Maltby, for New Line Cinema.

=== A Change of Seasons ===
After he saw the film A Man, a Woman, and a Bank, film producer Martin Ransohoff hired Black to direct Shirley MacLaine and Anthony Hopkins in Consenting Adults, later to be titled A Change of Seasons (1980). However, Black had been removed from the film after shooting the first half of it due to creative differences.

=== Psycho IV ===
Towards the end of Anthony Perkins' life, he fought long and hard to get Black to direct Psycho IV (1990), but that too was in vain.

== Personal life and death ==
Black was married twice, to Sandra MacPhail and Catherine Cownie. Both marriages ended in divorce. Black had two children, a daughter Nicole and a son Marco, from his marriage to MacPhail. Marco Black was "inspired to join the family business" by his father, and he has worked as a unit production manager on CBS's Extant and an assistant director on such films as the Will Ferrell comedy Old School (2003).

On July 5, 2014, Black died in Santa Barbara Cottage Hospital, located in Santa Barbara, California, of bacterial pneumonia at the age of 77. He is survived by his two children, as well as his son-in-law Renaud Gonthier, and his five grandchildren: Morgan, Cameron, Sidney, Hayden and John.

== Preservation ==
The Academy Film Archive has preserved a number of Noel Black's films, including Reflections, The River Boy, and Skaterdater.

== Partial filmography ==
- The River Boy (1964)
- Skaterdater (1965, Oscar nomination)
- ABC Stage 67 (1 episode, 1967)
- Trilogy: The American Boy (1968) (TV)
- One Life to Live (1968)
- Pretty Poison (1968)
- Cover Me Babe (1970)
- Jennifer on My Mind (1971)
- Amy Prentiss (1974)
- Quincy M.E. (1 episode, 1976)
- Switch (1 episode, 1976)
- Kojak (1 episode, 1977)
- McCloud (1 episode, 1977)
- I'm a Fool (1977) (TV)
- The Hardy Boys/Nancy Drew Mysteries (2 episodes, 1977)
- Mulligan's Stew (1 episode, 1977)
- Big Hawaii (1 episode, 1977)
- The World Beyond (1978)
- Mirrors (1978)
- Hawaii Five-O (1 episode, 1978)
- A Man, a Woman and a Bank (1979)
- The Golden Honeymoon (1980)
- A Change of Seasons (1980)
- The Other Victim (1981)
- The Electric Grandmother (1982)
- Prime Suspect (1982)
- Happy Endings (1983)
- Private School (1983)
- Quarterback Princess (1983)
- Deadly Intentions (1985)
- Promises to Keep (1985)
- A Time to Triumph (1986)
- My Two Loves (1986) (TV)
- The Twilight Zone (2 episodes, 1986–1987)
- CBS Summer Playhouse (1 episode, 1987)
- A Conspiracy of Love (1987)
- The Town Bully (1988)
- Meet the Munceys (1988)
- Dolphin Cove (1989)
- Nightmare Classics (1 episode, 1989)
- The Baby-Sitters Club (1 episode, 1990)
- Over My Dead Body (1 episode, 1991)
- The Hollow Boy (1991)
- Swans Crossing (1992)
