= USS George C. Marshall =

Submarine of the United States

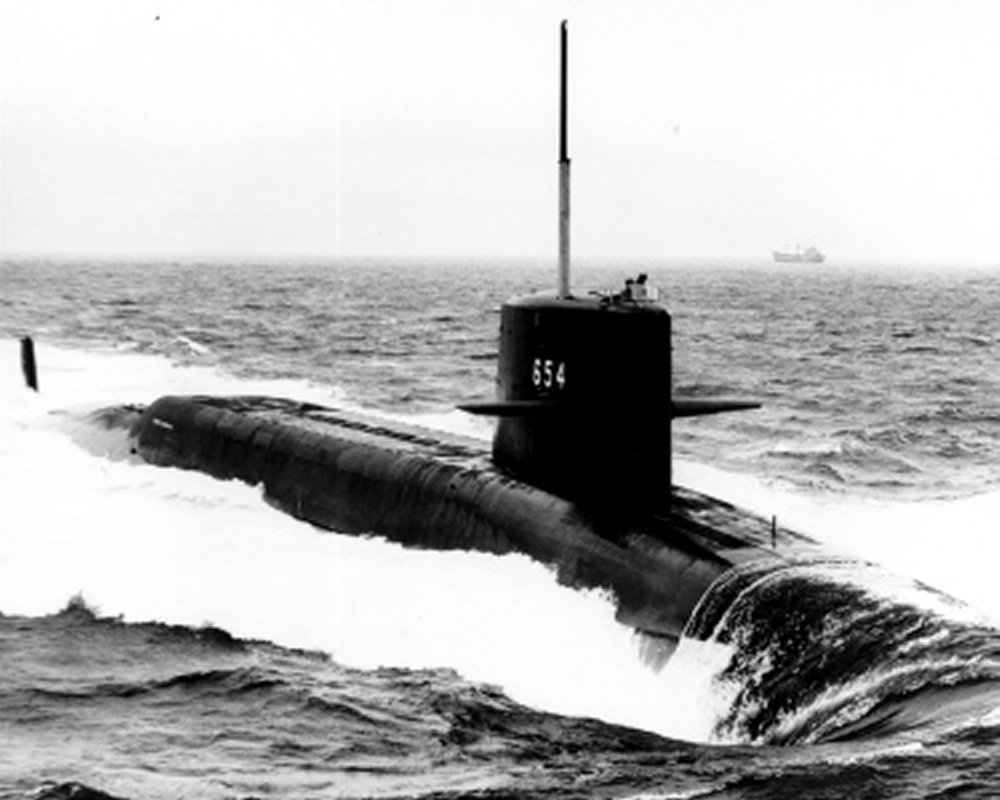
- Pre-commissioning photograph of USS George C. Marshall (SSBN-654) underway off Newport News, Virginia, on 31 March 1966

History

United States
- Namesake: General of the Army George C. Marshall (1880-1959), U.S. Secretary of State (1947-1949) and U.S. Secretary of Defense (1950-1951)
- Ordered: 29 July 1963
- Builder: Newport News Shipbuilding and Dry Dock Company, Newport News, Virginia
- Laid down: 2 March 1964
- Launched: 21 May 1965
- Sponsored by: Katherine Tupper Marshall
- Commissioned: 29 April 1966
- Decommissioned: 24 September 1992
- Stricken: 24 September 1992
- Motto: Patience, Not Weakness; Crew's unofficial motto: "Patience, My Ass"
- Fate: Scrapping via Ship and Submarine Recycling Program completed 28 February 1994

General characteristics
- Class & type: Benjamin Franklin-class fleet ballistic missile submarine
- Displacement: 7,300 long tons (7,417 t) surfaced; 8,250 long tons (8,382 t) submerged
- Length: 425 ft (130 m)
- Beam: 33 ft (10 m)
- Draft: 31 ft (9.4 m)
- Installed power: S5W pressurized-water nuclear reactor
- Propulsion: 2 × geared steam turbines; 1 × shaft 15,000 shp (11,185 kW)
- Speed: Over 20 knots (37 km/h; 23 mph)
- Test depth: 1,300 feet (400 m)
- Complement: Two crews (Blue Crew and Gold Crew) of 120 men each
- Armament: 16 × ballistic missile tubes with one ballistic missile each; 4 × Mark 65 Mod 3 and Mark 65 Mod 421 in (533 mm) torpedo tubes (all forward) with up to 13 Mark 48 torpedoes; SUBROC (removed 1981-1984); Mobile submarine simulator (MOSS) decoy capability 1981-1984

USS George C. Marshall (SSBN-654), a Benjamin Franklin-class ballistic missile submarine, was the only ship of the United States Navy to be named for General of the Army George C. Marshall (1880-1959), who served as U.S. Secretary of State from 1947 to 1949 and as U.S. Secretary of Defense from 1950 to 1951.

== Construction and commissioning ==
The contract to build George C. Marshall was awarded to Newport News Shipbuilding and Dry Dock Company in Newport News, Virginia, on 29 July 1963 and her keel was laid down there on 2 March 1964. She was launched on 21 May 1965, sponsored by Katherine Tupper Marshall, widow of General Marshal. At the launching ceremony, former U.S. Secretary of State Dean Acheson (1893–1971) eloquently described George C. Marshall's strategic deterrent role in the Cold War in this way: "... the waves set up by this launching will go to the furthest reaches of our foreign relations. The very existence of this ship, her power, her mission, her orders, her competence to execute them, will affect more computations, more decisions, than we can readily imagine. Far beyond the Pentagon, the State Department, and the White House, she will add a new factor, a new magnitude, to the correlation of forces by which the communists determine their decisions."

George C. Marshall was commissioned on 29 April 1966, with Commander Warren Richardson Cobean, Jr. in command of the Blue Crew and Commander Willard Edward Johnson in command of the Gold Crew.

== Service history ==
History needed for 1973-1981.

- September 1969, the Blue crew went aboard in Holy Loch, Scotland, and departed in October on patrol #7 under the command of Capt Hay. In December the ship returned to Holy Loch and the Gold crew took over.
- This sequence was repeated in March 1970 with the Blue crew returning on board in Holy Loch. It tied up alongside the submarine tender USS Canopus.
- 1970 and 1971, the Gold and Blue crews repeated the sequence except that the Gold crew returned to Charleston, SC in March 1971. The Blue crew was under the command of Capt Roy C. Paul for patrols #11 and #13 returning to Holy Loch before transit to overhaul via the Panama Canal.
- Refueling and Poseidon Conversion Overhaul September 1971- March 1973
- April 1973 successfully performed DASO ballistic missile launch
- November 1975 visited Faslane Submarine Base in Scotland
- Operated out of Rota Naval Station, Rota, Spain mid-1970s
- Late in 1970s "George C. Marshall" was caught in a fishing trawler net during a transit from Holy Loch, Scotland, leaving a scar on her sail from the wire
- In 1980 "George C. Marshall" went through an extensive overhaul in the floating dry dock USS Los Alamos (AFDB-7) in Holy Loch, Scotland
- Leaving Holy Loch, Scotland, "George C. Marshall" made a port call in Weymouth, England for 2 days
- Conducted midshipman ops out of Naval Submarine Base New London, CT
- Moved to Naval Submarine Base Kings Bay, GA for one patrol and test fired ballistic missiles prior to entering shipyard for overhaul
- Moved to Naval Weapons Station Charleston, SC to unload weapons prior to entering overhaul at Newport News Shipyard.

During an overhaul at Newport News Shipbuilding that lasted from 1981 to 1984, George C. Marshall underwent modifications that included the removal of her Mk 45 ASTOR (and the related 4FZ alarm system) and her Mark 14 torpedo and Mark 37 torpedo capabilities and the installation of a Mobile Submarine Simulator (MOSS) decoy capability on tubes 3 and 4.

History needed for 1984-1992.

George C. Marshall conducted 78 strategic deterrent patrols during her career and was one of the last units to leave Holy Loch, Scotland, following the closing of that base in 1992. She conducted her last dive off San Diego, California, in 1992 on her way to Bremerton, Washington, for decommissioning.

== Decommissioning and disposal ==
George C. Marshall was decommissioned on 24 September 1992 and stricken from the Naval Vessel Register the same day. Her scrapping via the Nuclear-Powered Ship and Submarine Recycling Program at Bremerton was completed on 28 February 1994.
