= Katherine Marshall =

Katherine Marshall may refer to:

- Katherine Tupper Marshall (1882–1978), American actress and writer
- Katherine "Kitty" Marshall (1870–1947), British suffragette
- Catherine Marshall (1914–1983), American author
- Catherine Marshall (suffragist) (1880–1961), women's suffrage and peace campaigner
- Kathryn Marshall (born 1967), Scottish golfer

== See also ==
- Cathy Marshall (disambiguation)
- Kate Marshall (born 1959), American politician
- Marshall (surname)
