= Cathy Marshall =

Cathy Marshall may refer to:

- Cathy Marshall (hypertext developer)
- Cathy Marshall (news anchor), American television journalist and news anchor
- Cathy Marshall (The Bill), character in The Bill

== See also ==
- Catherine Marshall (disambiguation)
