= 1966 Cannes Film Festival =

- Official poster of the 19th Cannes Film Festival, an original illustration by Rene Ferracci.
- Opening film: Modesty Blaise
- Closing film: Pharaoh
- Location: Cannes, France
- Founded: 1946
- Awards: Grand Prix: The Birds, the Bees and the Italians; A Man and a Woman
- No. of films: 25 (In Competition)
- Festival date: 5 May 1966 – 20 May 1966
- Website: festival-cannes.com/en

Cannes Film Festival
- 1967 1965

The 19th Cannes Film Festival took place from 5 to 20 May 1966. Italian actress Sophia Loren served as jury president for the main competition.

The Grand Prix du Festival International du Film, then the festival's main prize, was jointly awarded to The Birds, the Bees and the Italians by Pietro Germi and A Man and a Woman by Claude Lelouch.

To honour the festival's 20th anniversary, a special prize was given to Chimes at Midnight by Orson Welles.

The festival opened with Modesty Blaise by Joseph Losey, and closed with Pharaoh by Jerzy Kawalerowicz.

== Juries ==
=== Main Competition ===
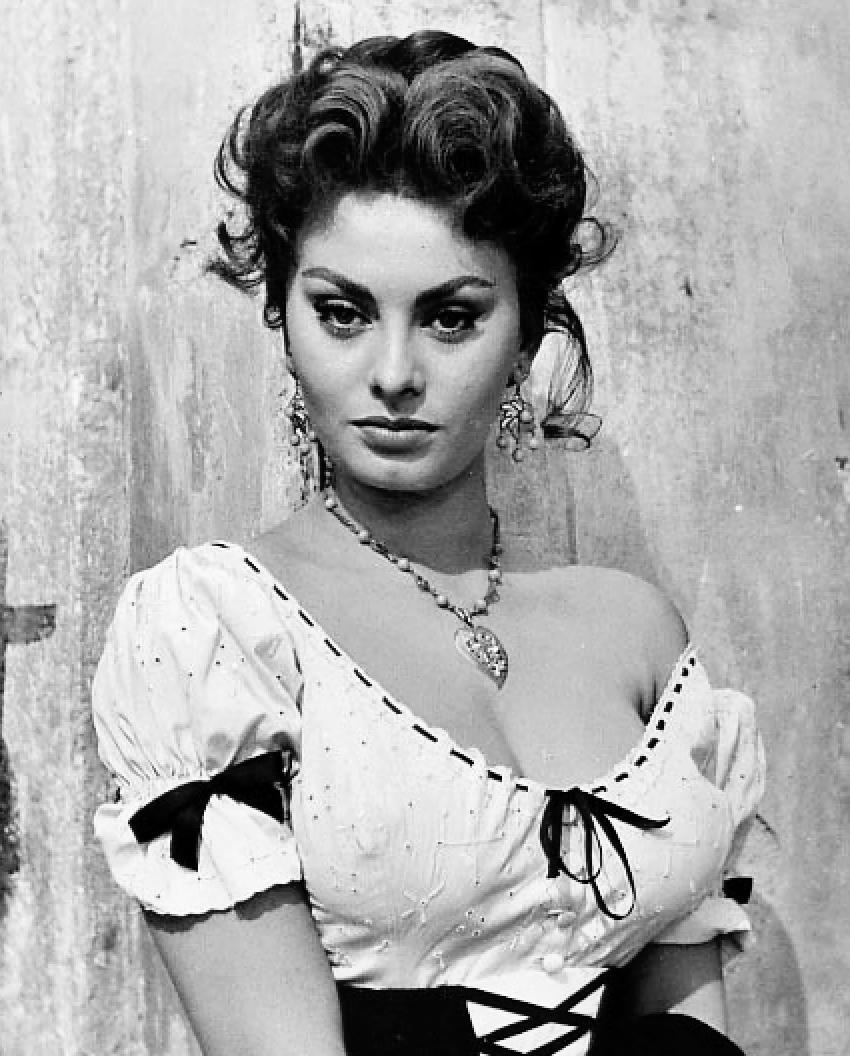
Sophia Loren, Jury President

- Sophia Loren, Italian actress - Jury President
- Marcel Achard, French writer
- Vinicius de Moraes, Brazilian writer and musician
- Tetsurō Furukaki, Japanese writer and diplomat
- Maurice Genevoix, French writer
- Jean Giono, French writer
- Maurice Lehmann, French actor
- Richard Lester, British filmmaker
- Denis Marion, Belgian journalist
- André Maurois, French writer
- Marcel Pagnol, French writer and filmmaker
- Yuli Raizman, Soviet filmmaker
- Armand Salacrou, French writer
- Peter Ustinov, Biritsh actor and filmmaker

=== Short Films Competition ===
- Charles Duvanel (Switzerland)
- Charles Ford (France) (author)
- Marcel Ichac (France)
- Jean Vivie (France) (CST official)
- Bo Widerberg (Sweden)

== Official Selection ==
=== In Competition ===
The following feature films competed for the Grand Prix du Festival International du Film:

English Title	Original Title	Director(s)	Production Country
Alfie		Lewis Gilbert	United Kingdom
The Ashes	Popioly	Andrzej Wajda	Poland
The Birds, the Bees and the Italians	Signore & Signori	Pietro Germi	Italy, France
Chimes at Midnight	Campanadas a medianoche	Orson Welles	Spain, France, Switzerland
Doctor Zhivago		David Lean	United Kingdom, Italy, United States
For Love and Gold	L'armata Brancaleone	Mario Monicelli	Italy
The Hawks and the Sparrows	Uccellacci e uccellini	Pier Paolo Pasolini	Italy
Hello, That's Me!	Բարև, ես եմ	Frunze Dovlatyan	Soviet Union
The Hour and Turn of Augusto Matraga	A Hora e Vez de Augusto Matraga	Roberto Santos	Brazil
Hunger	Svält	Henning Carlsen	Denmark, Norway, Sweden
It	Es	Ulrich Schamoni	West Germany
Lenin in Poland	Ленин в Польше	Sergei Yutkevich	Soviet Union
Mademoiselle		Tony Richardson	United Kingdom, France
A Man and a Woman	Un homme et une femme	Claude Lelouch	France
Modesty Blaise (opening film)		Joseph Losey	United Kingdom
Morgan – A Suitable Case for Treatment		Karel Reisz	United Kingdom
The Nun	La Religieuse	Jacques Rivette	France
Ön		Alf Sjöberg	Sweden
Pharaoh (closing film)	Faraon	Jerzy Kawalerowicz	Poland
The Pipes	Dýmky	Vojtěch Jasný	Czechoslovakia
Răscoala		Mircea Mureșan	Romania
The Round-Up	Szegénylegények	Miklós Jancsó	Hungary
Seconds		John Frankenheimer	United States
With the East Wind	Con el viento solano	Mario Camus	Spain
Young Törless	Der junge Törless	Volker Schlöndorff	West Germany, France

=== Short Films Competition ===
The following short films competed for the Grand Prix:

- Alberto Giacometti by Ernst Scheidegger and Peter Munger
- Bruegel et la folie des hommes - dulle griet by Jean Cleinge
- Le Chant du monde de Jean Lurcat by Pierre Biro and Victoria Mercanton
- Cislice by Pavel Prochazka
- The Dot and the Line by Chuck Jones
- The Drag by Carlos Marchiori
- Équivoque 1900 by Monique Lepeuve
- De Gewonde by Theo Van Haren Noman
- Miejsce by Edward Sturlis
- Muzikalno prase by Zlatko Grgic
- Nô by Eiji Murayama
- Reflections on Love by Joe Massot
- Les Rendez-vous de l'été by Jacques Ertaud and Raymond Zumstein
- Skaterdater by Noel Black
- L'Urlo by Camillo Bazzoni

== Parallel section ==
=== International Critics' Week ===
The following feature films were screened for the 5th International Critics' Week (5e Semaine de la Critique):

- Black Girl (La Noire de...) by Ousmane Sembène (France, Senegal)
- Bloko by Ado Kyrou (Greece)
- Children's Sicknesses (Gyerekbetegségek) by Ferenc Kardos, János Rózsa (Hungary)
- Du courage pour chaque jour by Evald Schorm (Czechoslovakia)
- O desafio by Paulo César Saraceni (Brazil)
- Fata morgana by Vicente Aranda (Spain)
- Man Is Not a Bird (Čovek nije tica) by Dusan Makavejev (Yugoslavia)
- Nicht versöhnt by Jean-Marie Straub (West Germany)
- Le Père Noël a les yeux bleus by Jean Eustache (France)
- Winter Kept Us Warm by David Secter (Canada)

== Official Awards ==
Pietro Germi, Grand Prix winner

=== Main Competition ===
- Grand Prix du Festival International du Film:
  - The Birds, the Bees and the Italians by Pietro Germi
  - A Man and a Woman by Claude Lelouch
- Prix spécial du Jury: Alfie by Lewis Gilbert
- Best Director: Sergei Yutkevich for Lenin in Poland
- Best Actress: Vanessa Redgrave for Morgan – A Suitable Case for Treatment
- Best Actor: Per Oscarsson for Hunger
- Best First Work: Răscoala by Mircea Mureșan
- 20th Anniversary Prize: Chimes at Midnight by Orson Welles
- Special Mention: Totò, for his acting performance in The Hawks and the Sparrows

=== Short Films Competition ===
- Short Film Gran Prix: Skaterdater by Noel Black
- Technical Grand Prize: Skaterdater by Noel Black

== Independent Awards ==
=== FIPRESCI Prize ===
- Young Törless by Volker Schlöndorff
  - Special Mention: Chimes at Midnight by Orson Welles

=== Commission Supérieure Technique ===
- Technical Grand Prize: Chimes at Midnight by Orson Welles

=== OCIC Award ===
- A Man and a Woman by Claude Lelouch

== Media ==
- British Pathé: Cannes Film Festival 1966 footage
- British Pathé: Cannes Film Festival 1966 footage
- British Pathé: Cannes Film Festival 1966 Originals
- INA: Opening of the 1966 festival (commentary in French)
- INA: List of winners of the 1966 festival (commentary in French)
