= Skaterdater =

- Directed by: Noel Black
- Written by: Noel Black
- Produced by: Marshal Backlar; Noel Black
- Starring: Michael Mel; Melissa Mallory; Gregg Carroll; Gary Hill; Bill McKaig; Gary Jennings; Bruce McKaig; Ricky Anderson
- Cinematography: Michael D. Murphy
- Edited by: Noel Black
- Music by: Mike Curb; Nick Venet
- Distributed by: United Artists
- Release date: 1965
- Running time: 18 minutes
- Country: United States
- Language: English

Skaterdater is a 1965 American short student film. It was produced by Marshal Backlar, and written and directed by Noel Black.

== Summary ==
The film tells a story with no dialogue. The group of boy skaters are suddenly at a point when one of the boys sees a young girl, and becomes interested in her. This causes a rift with a second boy, who challenges him to a skating duel that goes down a hilly street. The first boy loses; however, he ends up with the girl, and shortly, a few other girls are seen and become interested in the boys, too. The surf rock-esque soundtrack was composed by Mike Curb and Nick Venet with Davie Allan and the Arrows playing "Skaterdater Rock".

== Production ==
The skateboarders were members of the neighborhood Imperial Skateboard Club from Torrance, California. Their names are Gary Hill, Gregg Carroll, Mike Mel, Bill McKaig, Gary Jennings, Bruce McKaig and Rick Anderson. Melissa Mallory played the girl of the interest of one of the boy skaters. Most of the action shots were taken in Torrance, Redondo Beach, and Palos Verdes Estates. The final shot was Averill Park in San Pedro.

== Reception and legacy ==
It was the first film on skateboarding. It was distributed theatrically, both domestically and internationally, by United Artists. It was reviewed extensively by media outlets including Time magazine. It was the winner of the Palme d'Or for Best Short Film at the 1966 Cannes Film Festival. It was also nominated for an Academy Award in the Best Short Subject category.

Skaterdater has had lasting cultural relevance in the film industry. It has been the subject of scholarly articles on cinematography, and entrepreneur Steve Mariotti included it in a 2017 list of "15 films every entrepreneur must see".

The Academy Film Archive preserved Skaterdater in 2010.

The short was also spoofed by RiffTrax on August 15, 2025.

== See also ==
- List of American films of 1965
- Short Film Palme d'Or
