= Mirrors (1978 film) =

- Theatrical release poster
- Directed by: Noel Black
- Written by: Sidney L. Stebel
- Produced by: John T. Parker, Stirling W. Smith
- Starring: Kitty Winn; Peter Donat; William Swetland; Mary-Robin Redd
- Cinematography: Michael D. Murphy
- Edited by: Robert Estrin
- Music by: Stephen Lawrence
- Production companies: Cinema Systems, Southern Cinema Ventures
- Distributed by: First American Films
- Release date: February 1, 1978 (United States)
- Running time: 88 min
- Country: United States
- Language: English

Mirrors is a 1978 American horror film directed by Noel Black and starring Kitty Winn, Peter Donat, William Swetland, and Mary-Robin Redd. The film concentrates on a woman bedevilled by dark forces and voodoo magic, and has a tagline "There are some fools still living who don't believe in voodoo...but not for long!"

== Background ==
The film marks Black's attempt to return to the big screen. The film was initially titled Marianne and went through several rounds of editorial meddling and script changes, and remained unreleased for six years. Kitty Winn also played a supporting role in Exorcist II: The Heretic.

== Plot ==
A newlywed couple stay at an old small hotel in New Orleans. Soon the wife starts seeing strange visions in which she is sought by a sombre group of people for some dark purpose. When people around her start unexpectedly dying, she realizes that her dreams are real—as the hotel staff proceed to put an ancient voodoo priestess' curse on her. A mysterious doctor attempts to help her, but they have their suspicions about him as well.

== Cast ==
- Kitty Winn as Marianne Whitman
- Peter Donat as Dr. Philip Godard
- William Swetland as Charbonnet
- Mary-Robin Redd as Helene
- William Paul Burns as Gary Whitman
- Lou Wagner as Chet
- Don Keefer as Peter
- Barbara Coleman as Art Tour Guide
- Becki Davis as Betty
