= Katherine Tupper Marshall =

American actress, writer, and wife of soldier and statesman George C. Marshall

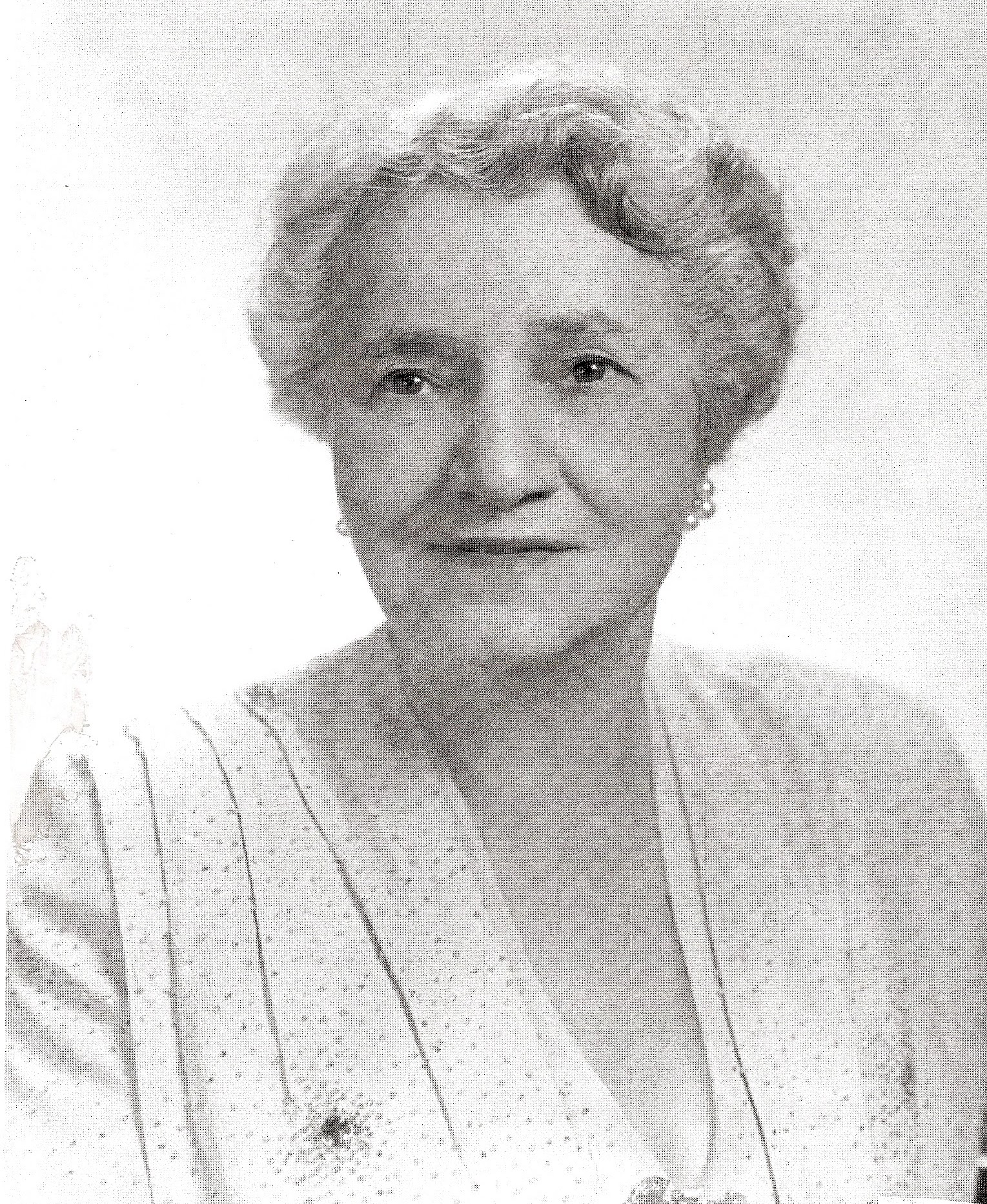
- Katherine Marshall in 1944
- Born: Katherine Boyce Tupper; October 8, 1882; Harrodsburg, Kentucky, U.S.
- Died: December 18, 1978 (aged 96); Loudoun Memorial Hospital, Leesburg, Virginia, U.S.
- Resting place: Arlington National Cemetery
- Education: Hollins Institute
- Known for: Wife of George C. Marshall
- Notable work: Together: Annals of an Army Wife (1946)
- Board member of: American Red Cross; Army Emergency Relief; Junior Officers, Inc. Soldiers, Sailors, and Marines Club
- Spouses: Clifton Stevenson Brown (m. 1911; died 1928) George C. Marshall (m. 1930; died 1959)
- Children: 3
- Relatives: Kitty Winn (granddaughter)

Katherine Boyce Marshall (née Tupper; October 8, 1882 – December 18, 1978) was an actress, writer, and wife of soldier and statesman George C. Marshall.

== Early life and education ==
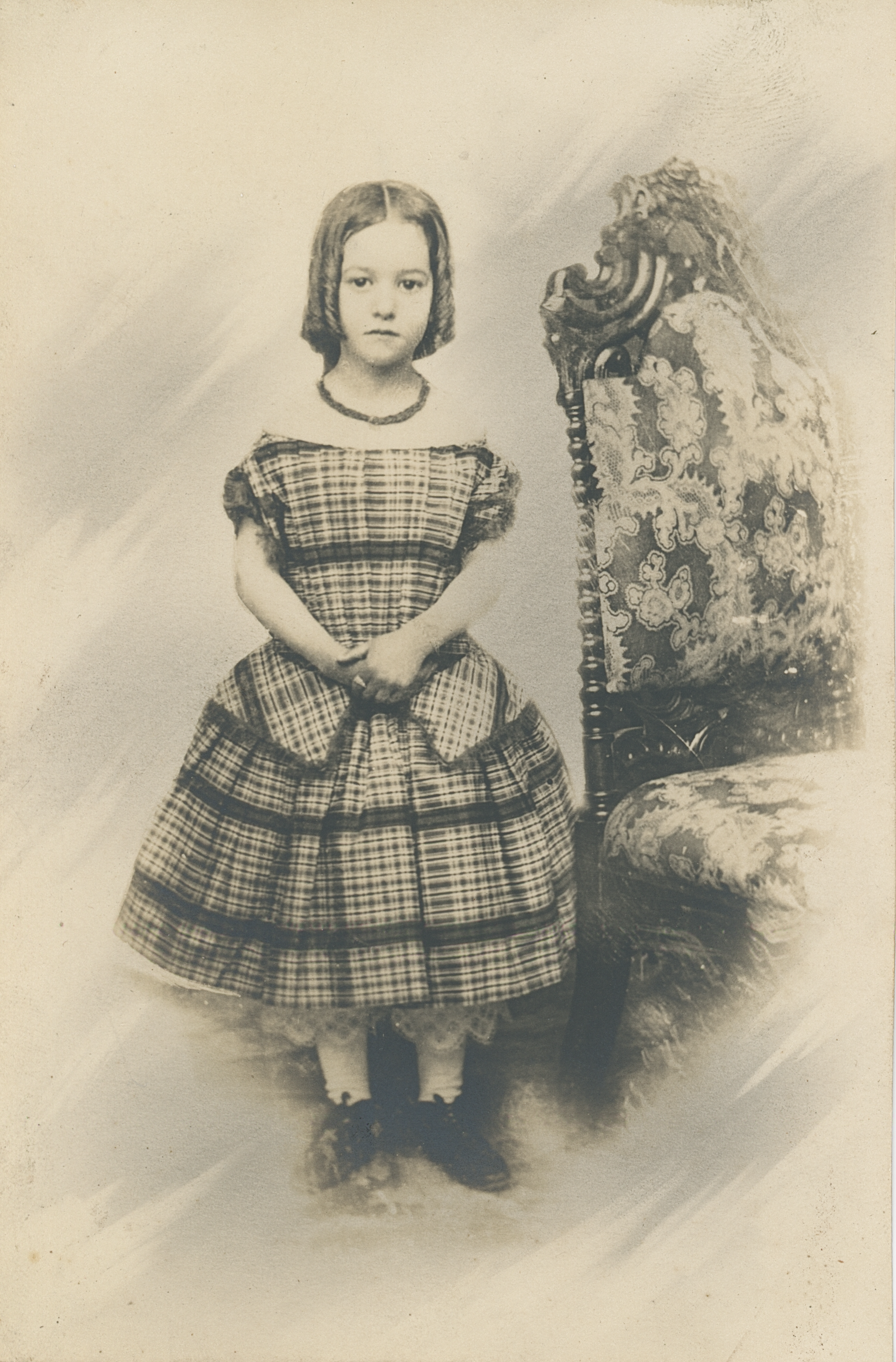
Katherine Tupper at eight years old. 1890.

Katherine Boyce Tupper was born the youngest of three children on October 8, 1882, in Harrodsburg, Kentucky, to Reverend Henry Allen Tupper Jr. and Marie Pender Tupper. The family moved as Reverend Tupper was called from Harrodsburg to Baltimore, Maryland, to Brooklyn, New York, where he took up a pastorate at Calvary Baptist Church in Gramercy Park.

Katherine and her sister Allene enrolled at the Hollins Institute in Roanoke, Virginia, in 1899. At the turn of the twentieth century, the number of Americans enrolled in institutions of higher education was slim, and the number of American women enrolled was even slimmer. During Katherine's time at Hollins, less than three percent of college-aged Americans attended college. Of that small percentage, thirty-six percent were women.

Katherine became a well-known and respected leader in the Hollins community while she pursued her acting career. Although she remained undistinguished academically, she exercised a marked influence in extracurricular activities. Her classmates and professors noticed as well, stating in her 1967 Hollins Medal citation that Katherine “[e]dited almost every publication at Hollins she did not manage, acted in every play she did not direct, was vice president of everything in which she was not president and had time left over to write poetry, be on the tennis team, and even to play the banjo.”

In 1902, Katherine graduated with an Eclectic Degree consisting of diplomas in elocution, moral science, history and English courses.

== Acting career ==
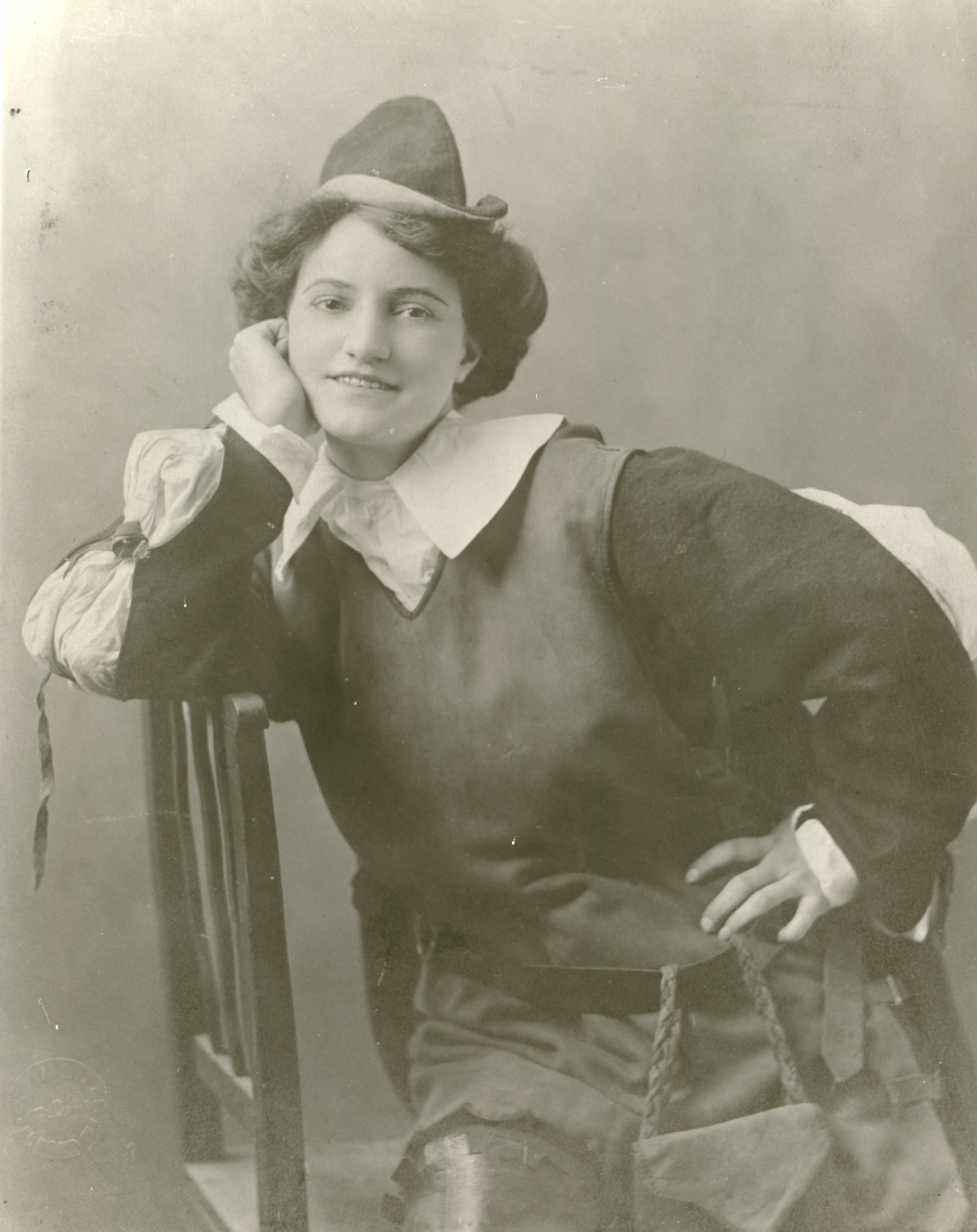
Katherine Boyce as Rosalind in As You Like It. Circa 1905.

After graduating from Hollins, Katherine enrolled in the American Academy of Dramatic Arts in New York City in 1902. Despite an agreement with her father to study theatre without actually appearing on stage, she carried the lead role in Mrs. Dane's Defence. As a result of her performance, she received an award from the academy and an offer from Broadway matinee idol, James K. Hackett, to work as his lead actress. Katherine's father, however, who “would rather see [her] dead than on stage,” forbade her to continue pursuing a career in New York.

Katherine moved to England to continue pursuing acting. She dropped her Tupper surname and adopted Boyce (her middle name) as her stage name. Accompanied by her sister Allene, and with a diploma and letter of introduction from the American Academy of Dramatic Arts, Katherine secured an interview with the renowned English actor Sir Herbert Beerbohm Tree, owner and manager of His Majesty's Theatre in London. However, Tree did not hire Katherine as he disliked her American accent.

With all “the nerve” and “the gall” she could muster, Katherine auditioned for Sir Frank Benson, a leading Shakespearean actor and producer. After three months of training with the Bertrand and Benson company, she made her first appearance on the English stage as an apparition in Macbeth. She was ultimately given a seven-year contract with Benson's company.

Katherine played four seasons with the Benson Company. She carried ten Shakespearean roles, including Juliet, Portia, and Ophelia. In addition to rehearsals, performances and travel, she battled intense stage fright. None of this, however, was enough to keep her off stage. “Nothing's going to stop me,” she told her sister resolutely in the squalid lodgings they had found in York, England. “I'm hitching my wagon to a star [and] I'm going to get there.”

While on tour, Katherine's health began to deteriorate under her rigorous schedule. After a summer-long convalescence with her family in Switzerland, she returned to London to resume acting. Despite the rest, however, she fell ill and collapsed after a performance in Edinburgh, Scotland. Diagnosed with “tuberculosis of the kidney,” Katherine was forced to end her career on stage in England and return to the United States. She was devastated. “My world tumbled to bits,” she later recalled. “I felt as if the earth had fallen from under me. Every thought, every ambition, every hope had vanished.”

After a year of recuperation in the U.S., Katherine was invited to join Richard Mansfield's theatre company in Chicago in 1907. But after appearing in just two performances, she once again collapsed, unable to ever resume her acting career.

== First marriage ==
During another convalescence in the Adirondack Mountains, a man named Clifton Stevenson Brown renewed the proposal of marriage he had made while Katherine was a student. Clifton argued that she had no remaining strength for theatre life and begged her to let him take care of her. After taking some time to consider and consult some close friends, Katherine accepted the proposal, and they were married on September 30, 1911.

Katherine and Clifton had three children: Molly Pender, Clifton Stevenson Jr., and Allen Tupper. However reluctantly she may have turned from her career to marriage, motherhood “made it all different.”

Katherine found going from actress to wife and homemaker “rather strange.” She often had trouble determining which characteristics belonged to which role. “At times,” she explained, “it was hard to know whether I had gone from the sublime to the ridiculous, or the ridiculous to the sublime.” In any case, she and Clifton were happily married.

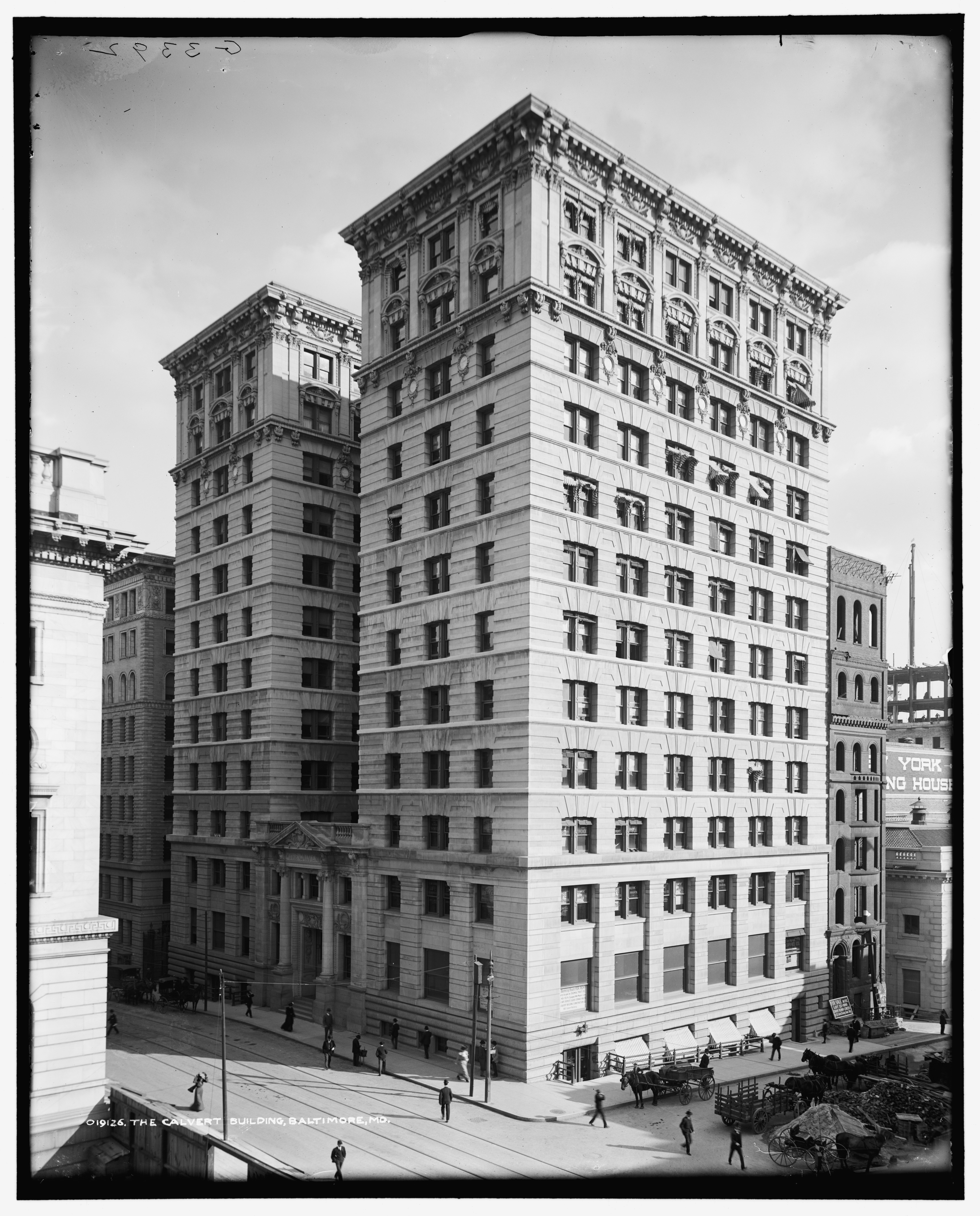
The Calvert Building in Baltimore where Clifton Brown was shot and mortally wounded on June 4, 1928.

=== Personal tragedy ===
Katherine's happy years with her husband and children soon ended. On June 4, 1928, she phoned Clifton's office inside the Calvert Building to tell him about an offer she had received on her cottage at Fire Island, New York. There was no answer. She phoned again. No answer. During her third attempt, two men came up the front steps to tell her that her husband had been shot in the back while unlocking his office that morning.

Clifton had become a highly successful trial lawyer in Baltimore, Maryland. “[He] never lost a case in the Court of Appeals,” Katherine recalled, “never a one.” Earlier that year, he had agreed to represent Louis Berman in settling the estate of the client's recently deceased father. Clifton won the appeal and sent his client the bill. When Berman refused to pay, however, Clifton sued him. An enraged Berman lay in wait at Clifton's office, where he shot his lawyer five times. Clifton died minutes after he arrived at the hospital.

Once again, Katherine was devastated. “[T]he whole foundation seemed to have crumbled,” she recalled.

== Second marriage ==
While in mourning, Katherine moved in with a family friend in Columbus, Georgia. While at a dinner party, Katherine met George C. Marshall. She recalls observing the 48-year-old lieutenant colonel in the room as a “very interesting officer” with “sandy hair and deep-set eyes” making himself comfortable in front of the fireplace.

Within two years, Katherine's acquaintance with George Marshall developed into a deep and mutual affection, topped off with his proposal of marriage. Her decision was not one she felt she could make on her own. Before accepting him, she insisted on obtaining the consent of her three children. Molly, Clifton and Allen agreed. The youngest had reservations at first, but later wrote a letter assuring the colonel that it was “OK with [him],” signing it “A friend in need is a friend indeed.”

On October 15, 1930, George and Katherine were married at Emmanuel Episcopal Church in Baltimore. The humble, quiet beginnings of their relationship contrasted with the fanfare of their wedding, caused primarily by the presence of Marshall's best man, General of the Armies John J. Pershing. Although it was Pershing who attracted the attention, the public eye fixed its gaze on the new Mrs. Marshall that day as an object of curiosity and admiration. Her life as private individual was now eclipsed by her role as public figure.

== Public life ==
The day after her wedding, Katherine arrived at Fort Benning, Georgia, to find herself quickly becoming the local socialite. Dinner parties, teas and ceremonies became regular procedures for Katherine as she worked to support her husband's efforts in training a small, disheveled American army unprepared for the upcoming war.

Katherine's social obligations increased with the couple's move to Washington, D.C., in 1938. As an Army general, Marshall's advancement and reputation rested heavily on his conformity to protocol and etiquette. As the wife of a general, Katherine attended and hosted a variety of social events that required her to conform to the same protocol and etiquette.

Although Katherine was challenged by her new role, she effectively carried out her responsibilities.

=== World War II ===
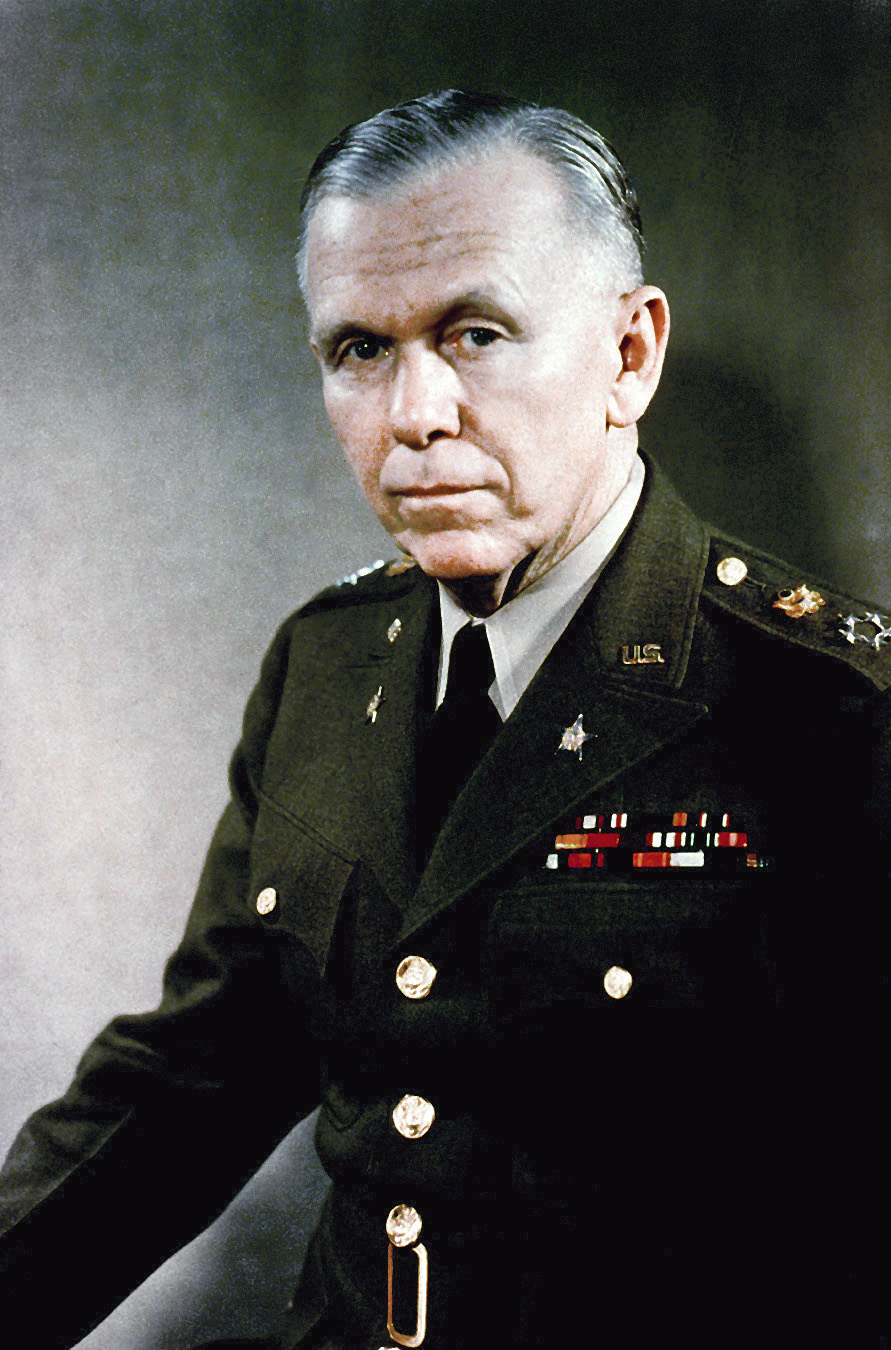
General George C. Marshall. 1946.

In many ways, Marshall's appointment as Chief of Staff of the U.S. Army in 1939 advanced Katherine's position as much as his own. With her husband's promotion, she rose from wife of a general to "First Lady of the Army."

The new role came with new obligations. Katherine became a member of boards for several humanitarian organizations, including the American Red Cross, Army Emergency Relief and the Soldiers, Sailors, and Marines Club in New York City. She made numerous public appearances receiving bouquets and speaking at war bond drives.

It was during these active years of public life that Katherine suffered another deeply personal loss. On May 31, 1944, General Marshall received an urgent message: Allen, Katherine's youngest child, had been killed in action in Anzio, Italy. Sixteen years earlier, she had buried her first husband, the father of her children. Now one of her sons was burying the other overseas, and she would not be able to visit his grave until after the war.

During the war, Katherine was Marshall's first line of defense against physical and mental exhaustion. In their frequent walks before dinner, she would act as his sounding board, allowing him to sort out his problems in the comforting presence of an attentive listener. She became his only real confidante.

Katherine's conversations with her husband revealed the need for a place of quiet and respite, away from the demands of life in Washington. She took it upon herself to find that place in the spring of 1941. Her search led her to a nineteenth-century home in Leesburg, Virginia, called Dodona Manor. After paying $10 in earnest money, the Marshalls purchased their new home for $16,000. Katherine oversaw repairs, renovations and finishing touches in preparation for her husband's arrival. The following year, Marshall came to Dodona and remarked, “This is Home, a real home after forty-one years of wandering.”

=== Post war ===
The end of the war in 1945 did not bring the well-deserved relief of retirement for Katherine and her husband. General Marshall went on to serve as special presidential envoy to China, secretary of state, president of the American Red Cross and secretary of defense. These years came with longer periods of relaxation, but the couple was often apart for months at a time. The press eagerly photographed Katherine's reunions with Marshall upon his returns from overseas.

In 1946, Katherine published Together: Annals of an Army Wife, an informal narrative of her years as his wife and confidante. Although Marshall's life and career had not fully run their course at the time of the book's publication, it supplied (and continues to supply) invaluable insight into both.

Withdrawing to the privacy of their new home in Leesburg did not mean completely withdrawing from public life, however. It was at Dodona that President Harry S. Truman asked Marshall to become his secretary of defense in 1950. Katherine later said that “they kept taking my George away from me” despite her best efforts to alleviate the demands of public service that had claimed her husband's life for so many years. She persevered with him to the end when he officially retired in 1951.

== Personal life ==
Katherine had three children with her first husband, Clifton Brown: Molly Winn (1912–1997), Clifton Stevenson Brown (1914–1952), and Allen Tupper Brown (1916–1944). George Marshall and Katherine did not have any children. In total, the Marshalls had five grandchildren who would often visit the retired couple in Leesburg.

An avid rose gardener, Katherine cared for over twenty varieties of roses at Dodona Manor. Katherine's love of roses was well known, leading inventor Eugene S. Boerner to create the Katherine Tupper Marshall Rose, a pink hybrid tea rose. It was patented by Jackson and Perkins in 1943.

== Later life and death ==
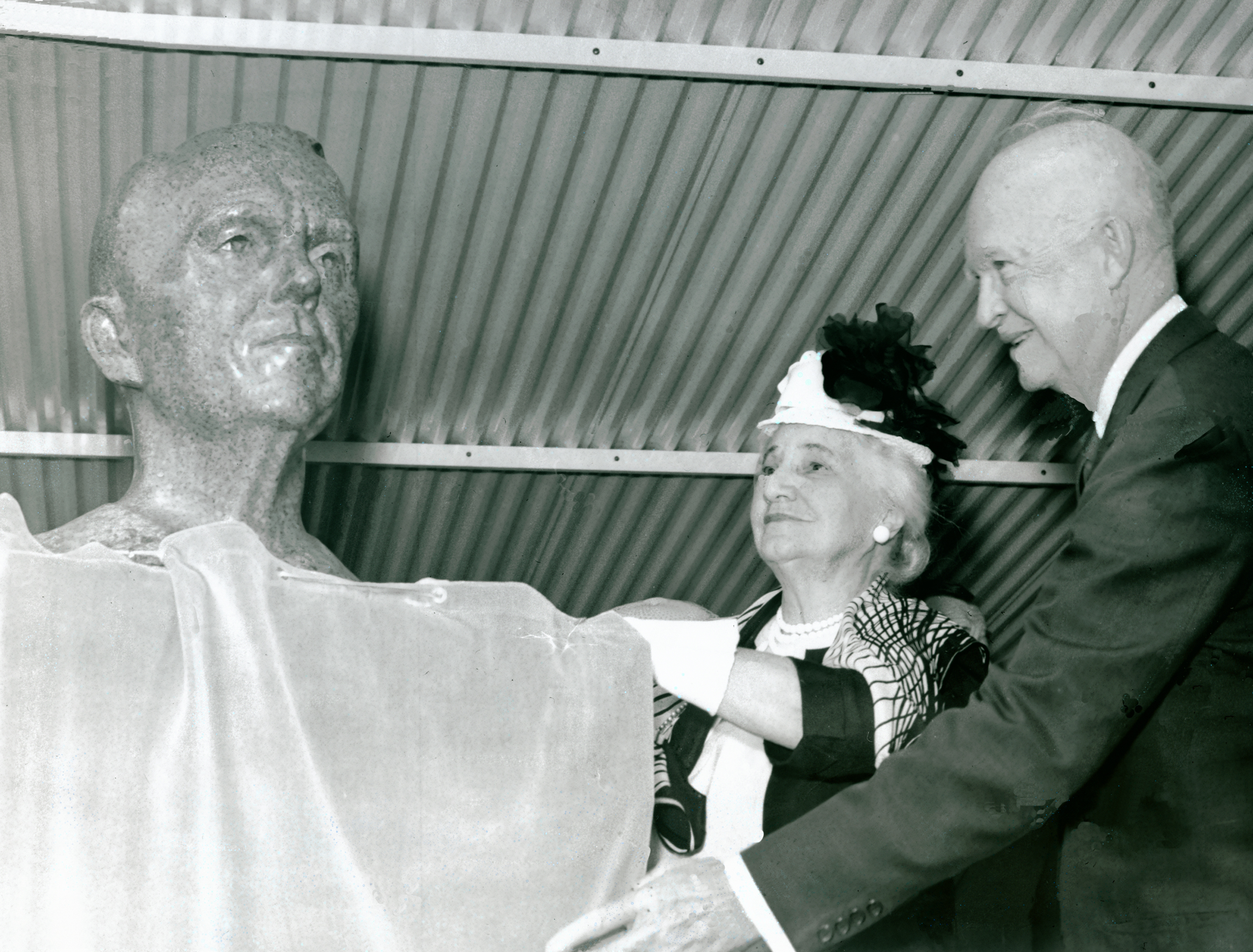
Katherine Marshall and President Dwight D. Eisenhower unveil a bust of General Marshall at the Marshall Space Flight Center in Huntsville, Alabama, on September 8, 1960.

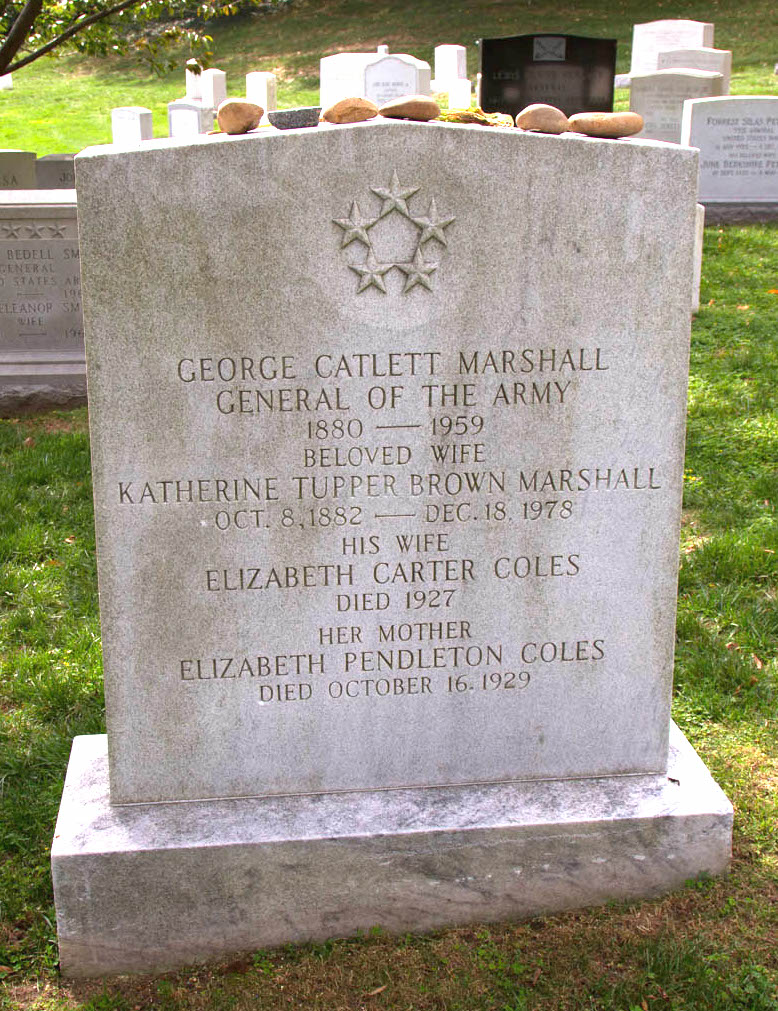
Katherine Marshall's grave at Arlington National Cemetery

Following her husband's death in 1959, Katherine found that Dodona Manor held too many memories for her to remain there, and so she retired to a residential hotel in Tryon, North Carolina. Although her role as a public figure had effectively ended with Marshall's death, she made a handful of public appearances to commemorate his legacy.

On September 8, 1960, Katherine and President Dwight D. Eisenhower unveiled a bust of General Marshall at the former Redstone Arsenal, which had been renamed the George C. Marshall Space Flight Center.

Katherine Marshall was invited to attend a state dinner at the White House on April 29, 1962. President John F. Kennedy honored of General Marshall and 49 other Nobel Prize laureates at this dinner, coined the "Brains Dinner."

In 1953, the George C. Marshall Foundation began constructing a research library on the campus of the Virginia Military Institute. Along with Katherine Marshall, Presidents Lyndon B. Johnson and Dwight Eisenhower attended the dedication ceremony on May 23, 1964.

Katherine died on December 18, 1978, at the age of 96. At her death, a reporter for the New York Times called Katherine “a lady of subdued, relaxed gaiety." Katherine Marshall was buried at Arlington National Cemetery.

== See also ==
- Kitty Winn
- USS George C. Marshall (SSBN-654)
- Pinehurst, North Carolina
- George C. Marshall's Dodona Manor
