= George C. Marshall's Dodona Manor =

Historic house in Virginia, US

- Dodona Manor
- U.S. National Register of Historic Places
- U.S. National Historic Landmark
- U.S. Historic district – Contributing property
- Virginia Landmarks Register
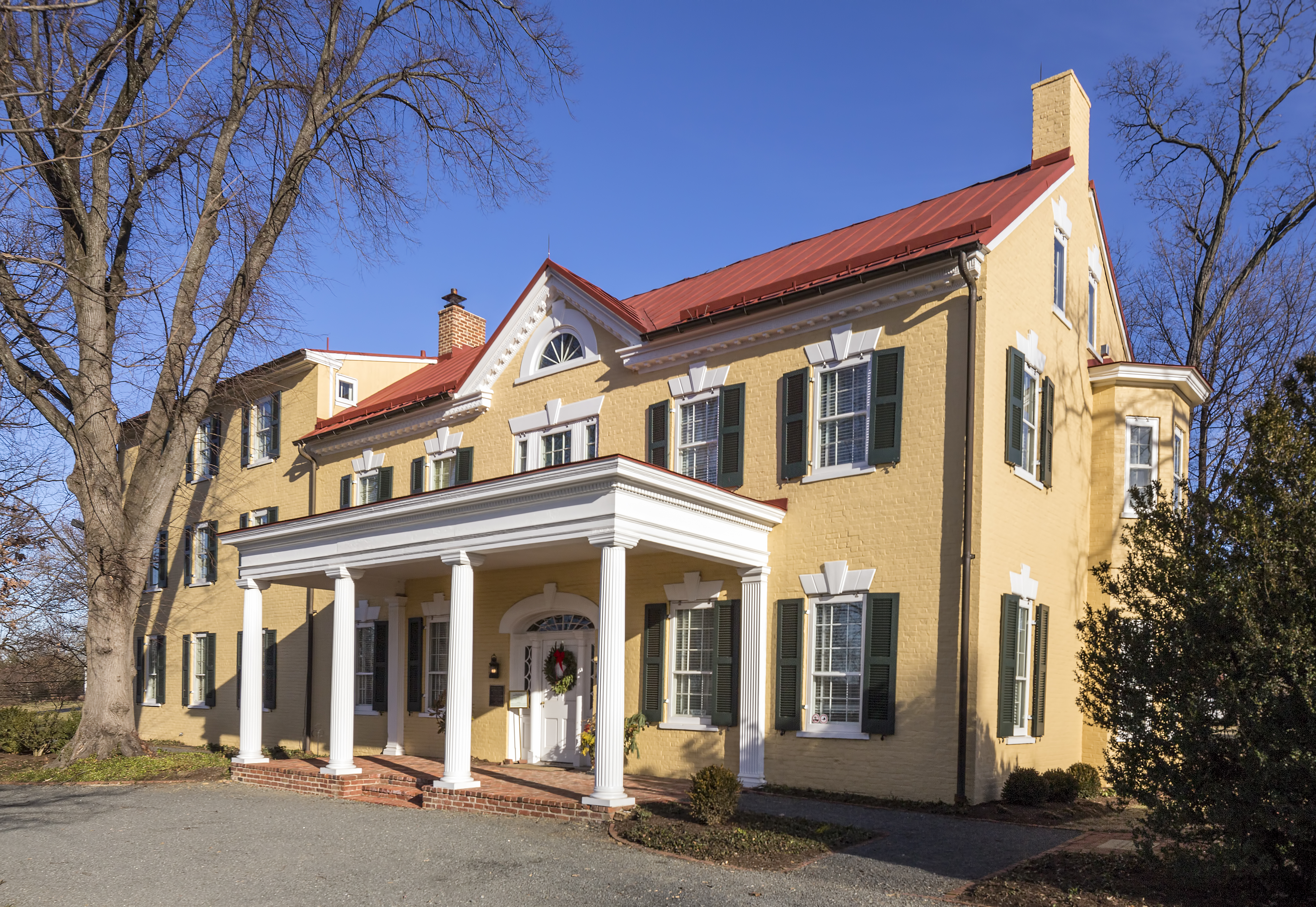
- Dodona Manor in 2018

- Location within Northern Virginia Location within Virginia Location within the United States
- Interactive map of Dodona Manor
- Location: 312 East Market St., Leesburg, Virginia
- Coordinates: 39°6′48.6″N 77°33′34.6″W
- Area: 3.88 acres (1.57 ha)
- Built: 1807, 1820s, 1850s
- Architectural style: Federal
- Restored: 1995–2005
- Restored by: George C. Marshall Home Preservation Fund
- Website: georgecmarshall.org
- Part of: Leesburg Historic District (ID70000807)
- NRHP reference No.: 96000972
- VLR No.: 253-0009

Significant dates
- Added to NRHP: June 19, 1996
- Designated NHL: June 19, 1996
- Designated VLR: December 4, 1996

Dodona Manor, the former home of General George Catlett Marshall (1880–1959), is a National Historic Landmark and historic house museum at 312 East Market Street in Leesburg, Virginia. It is owned by the George C. Marshall International Center, which has restored the property to its Marshall-era appearance of the 1950s. It is nationally significant as the home of George C. Marshall, Chief of Staff of the United States Army during World War II, Secretary of State, President of the American Red Cross, and Secretary of Defense. Public Law 119-115, enacted on Sept. 25, 2026, designated the property as an affiliated area of the National Park System.

== Description ==
Marshall and his wife Katherine purchased the property for $16,000 in 1941 and lived there until his death on October 16, 1959. Legend has it that Katherine paid the owners $10 earnest money and threw the "for sale" sign into the bushes as she left to discourage the competition. Except for a winter home in Pinehurst, N.C., this house was the only home Marshall ever owned, and was the backdrop to quiet conversations and contemplations of international importance. The widowed Katherine gave the house and 3.88 acres to her daughter, Molly Winn, in 1960 when she moved to Pinehurst for permanent residence.

When Mrs. Winn expressed her desire to sell the property in the early 1990s, several prominent Leesburg citizens under the leadership of B. Powell Harrison, fearing that the property might fall into commercial hands and be demolished, urged the Town of Leesburg to purchase it. That proved to be impossible, so the citizens formed the George C. Marshall Home Preservation Fund, later the George C. Marshall International Center, and purchased Dodona Manor for $2.3 million. After renovations costing more than $4.5 million, the house opened as a museum on Veterans Day in 2005.

Dodona Manor during the initial restoration. The building's 1820s addition is seen on the right.

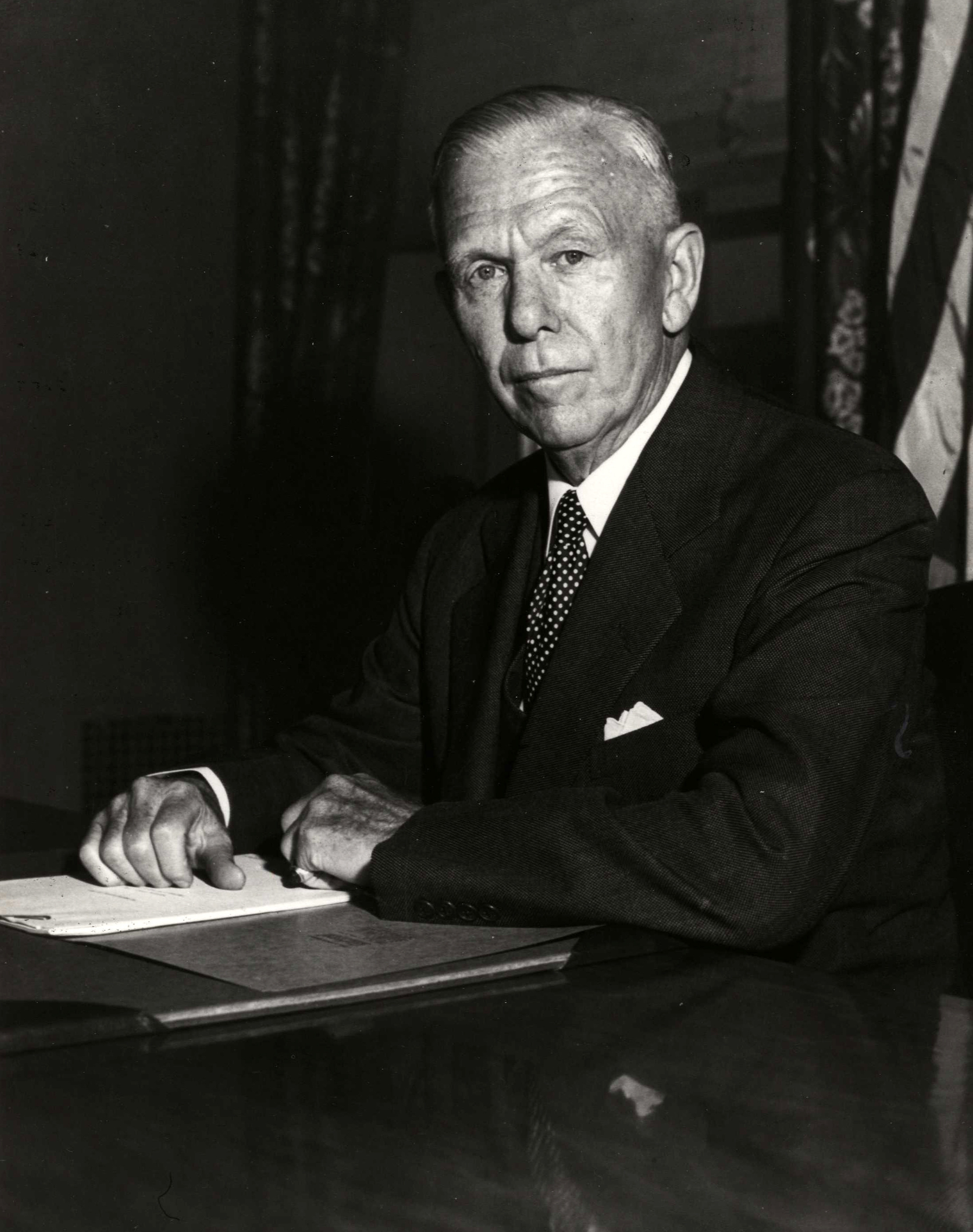
Secretary of State George C. Marshall

Much of the money for the purchase and renovation was donated by European nations that had benefited from the Marshall Plan. Further funding was provided by grants from the Commonwealth of Virginia, National Park Service (Save America's Treasures program), U.S. Department of Housing and Urban Development, Garden Club of Virginia, and generous private donations.

George C. Marshall's Dodona Manor was declared a National Historic Landmark in 1996.

== History ==
The house was named Dodona Manor before the Marshalls purchased it. The name derives from Dodona, a shrine in ancient Greece where priests and priestesses interpreted the rustling of oak (and beech) leaves as messages from the gods. Dating from the second millennium BCE, the Dodona shrine was considered to be second in prestige only to Delphi. Due to the large number of oak trees located on and around the property, naming the house Dodona Manor seemed appropriate.

There is evidence that a two-story house existed on the property with five-course American brickwork in the early 1800s. John Drish, who purchased the property in 1805, added a Federal-style wing with Flemish bond brickwork and keystone arches in the mid-1820s and gave the property to his son Wilson Drish, who sold it to Fayette Ball, a distant relative of George Washington, in 1855. In 1856, the Rev. Charles Nourse, principal of the Leesburg Academy, purchased it—then known as Oak Hill. He tried unsuccessfully to sell it in 1859, and then opened the Loudoun Female Collegiate Institute in the house in 1860, after completing an addition to increase the number of bedrooms. Subsequent owners included Sophia Delany, Joseph and Martha Prather, Wallace and Sally George, Yvon and Ella Pike and Marcia McCann Ely and Northcutt Ely, who added electricity and indoor plumbing and named the property "Elvon." The Elys eventually sold it to the Marshalls. The Marshalls also added a stone court, and changed the wooden porch to a more durable brick.

== Collections ==
Dodona Manor is unique among historic houses because over 90% of the furnishings and memorabilia in the house were owned and used by the Marshalls and were obtained from Mrs. Marshall's heirs. Due to the extensive disrepair over time, detailed plans for the conservation and placement of the collection and for the reproduction of the original floor and wall coverings were developed by Dr. William Seale, a leading expert in the field, and Anne Horstman, who served as executive vice president of the Marshall Center during the restoration.

Among the items are originals or reproductions of art given to the Marshalls, including a reproduction of View of Tinherir, painted by Sir Winston Churchill in Morocco in 1951 and given to the Marshalls in 1953. The original View of Tinherir was sold at auction by Marshall's granddaughter Kitty Winn in 2006 for £612,800 ($1.2 million in 2024), a record price for a Churchill painting at that time.

Another reproduction is Evening, by Russian artist Vassily Baksheyev. The original was a gift to Marshall from Vyacheslav Molotov, foreign minister of the Soviet Union, in 1947 in appreciation for Marshall's efforts in World War II.

Dodona Manor also has an original black and white landscape painted by Soong Mei-ling, wife of the president of the Republic of China, Chiang Kai-shek. She and the Marshalls became close friends when Marshall was President Harry Truman’s special envoy to China in 1946–47, and Madame Chiang visited Dodona Manor on at least one occasion. Other pieces of Chinese art in the house include a painting by Wen Xuan Dai, a gift from the Chiangs to Katherine on her 64th birthday in 1946, and a fish painting by Tzulu Shen gifted by the Chinese Cultural Enterprise as a thank you for Marshall's efforts in China.

For Christmas 1959, two months after Marshall died, President Dwight D. Eisenhower sent a print of his watercolor painting of Mount Eisenhower, currently Castle Mountain, located in Alberta, Canada, to Mrs. Marshall, with a handwritten note. Both are on display in Dodona Manor.

Also on display is Marshall's favorite red La-Z-boy next to his General Electric radio and television combination set, where he would listen to his favorite baseball team, the Brooklyn Dodgers, and watch his favorite TV shows including I Love Lucy, Gunsmoke, and American Bandstand in one of the most comfortable rooms in the house, the library. This room includes many treasured items including figurines of a Chinese wedding procession given to Marshall by Madame Chiang Kai-chek, a portrait of Colonel Robert E. Lee, and scores of the Marshalls' books, usually historical biographies. Although Lee attended West Point and Marshall attended VMI, Marshall considered General Lee and George Washington brilliant military strategists, which is evident by the multiple portraits seen throughout the house.

Due to her fondness for the Marshalls, Madame Chiang was a guest at Dodona Manor many times throughout the 1940s and 1950s. The original master bedroom was converted to a guest bedroom, while George and Katherine occupied the two original guest bedrooms connected by a Jack and Jill bathroom. The use of separate bedrooms suited their different habits: George was a military man who woke up early and enjoyed his own space, similar to the days of military barracks living, whereas Katherine enjoyed sleeping late and having breakfast in bed. Madame Chiang brought with her three to five servants who stayed in the grandchildren's nursery.

== Grounds ==
To protect the views from Dodona Manor, the George C. Marshall Preservation Fund purchased eleven surrounding properties during the principal restoration, ten of which have since been sold off. A shopping center known as "The Shops at Dodona Manor" is owned by the Marshall Center and generates revenue for the site. The grounds have been restored to their Marshall-era appearance of the 1950s and include a large vegetable garden that was restorative as an antidote to the pressures Marshall felt as Army Chief of Staff. Katherine delighted in growing roses, and a restored rose garden features the types of roses she cultivated. George Marshall himself was known as a great proponent of mulch in gardening.

== See also ==
- List of National Historic Landmarks in Virginia
- National Register of Historic Places listings in Loudoun County, Virginia
- Virginia Landmarks Register
