= Pretty Poison (film) =

1968 film by Noel Black

- Original film poster
- Directed by: Noel Black
- Screenplay by: Lorenzo Semple Jr.
- Based on: She Let Him Continue by Stephen Geller
- Produced by: Marshal Backlar; Noel Black
- Starring: Anthony Perkins; Tuesday Weld; Beverly Garland; John Randolph; Dick O'Neill
- Cinematography: David Quaid
- Edited by: William H. Ziegler
- Music by: Johnny Mandel
- Distributed by: 20th Century Fox
- Release date: September 18, 1968
- Running time: 89 minutes
- Country: United States
- Language: English
- Budget: $1.3 million

Pretty Poison is a 1968 American dark comedy crime film directed by Noel Black, starring Anthony Perkins and Tuesday Weld, about an ex-convict and a high school cheerleader who commit a series of crimes. The film was based on the novel She Let Him Continue by Stephen Geller. It has become a cult film.

== Plot ==
Dennis Pitt is a disturbed young man on parole from a mental institution who becomes attracted to teenager Sue Ann Stepanek. He tells her that he is a secret agent, and takes her along on a series of "missions". Things, however, turn out disastrously when Dennis takes Sue Ann along to sabotage a factory on imaginary orders from the CIA. When the couple encounters the factory's night watchman, Sue Ann knocks him unconscious and then drowns him. While Dennis is wracked with guilt over both what he has done and what he has allowed to happen, Sue Ann is excited by the "adventure" and entreats Dennis to run away with her to Mexico. First, however, they have to get rid of her disapproving mother. The couple return to Sue Ann's home for her clothes and are interrupted by the arrival of Mrs. Stepanek. Sue Ann realizes that Dennis is incapable of actually killing a person, so she shoots her mother and orders Dennis to dispose of the body. But instead, he calls the police.

Dennis knows that the police will take Sue Ann's word over his, so he makes no effort to defend himself in court and takes the blame for their crimes. Sue Ann, meanwhile, betrays him without a second thought, sending him to prison for life. Dennis is more than happy to be locked up, as it keeps him away from Sue Ann, of whom he is now quite frightened. While Dennis refuses to tell his skeptical parole officer Azenauer the truth, he asks him to "see what Sue Ann is up to" in hopes she will be exposed for what she really is. The film ends with Sue Ann meeting a young man and lamenting to him that the people who took her in after her mother's death won't let her stay out late; it is implied that she will use and destroy him just as she did Dennis. But Dennis's parole officer is indeed watching as she departs with her latest victim.

== Cast ==
- Anthony Perkins as Dennis Pitt
- Tuesday Weld as Sue Ann Stepanek
- Beverly Garland as Mrs. Stepanek
- John Randolph as Morton Azenauer
- Dick O'Neill as Bud Munsch
- Clarice Blackburn as Mrs. Bronson
- Joseph Bova as Pete
- Ken Kercheval as Harry Jackson
- Don Fellows as Detective

== Production ==
=== Development ===
The novel She Let Him Continue was published in 1966. The Los Angeles Times called it "an interesting if not overly impressive debut."

The novel was optioned for the movies. Lawrence Turman agreed to act as executive producer for producer Marshall Backlar and director Noel Black, who had just made the short Skaterdater together. Skaterdater had been made for $17,000 and sold to United Artists for $50,000, winning the Palme d'Or for Best Short Film at the 1966 Cannes Film Festival, and being nominated for an Oscar for Best Short Film.

Turman described the novel as "a hip horror story about today's alienated youth." Black said it was about "a Walter Mitty type who comes up against a teenybopper Lady Macbeth."

Turman had just made The Flim Flam Man for 20th Century Fox and obtained finance from the same studio. Lorenzo Semple Jr. was hired to write the screenplay. Turman says Semple turned in a "magnificent script in six weeks."

Semple says "we couldn’t get any money from Fox, I think we wanted $17,000 to write the screenplay and they said no, they couldn't afford it. I said I'll write the script on spec and we'd split all monies from it, which is what I did. I wrote the script on spec."

=== Casting ===
Tuesday Weld signed to play the female lead with Anthony Perkins as costar. It was the first film Perkins made in Hollywood since Psycho.

Black later recalled he cast Perkins after seeing him on stage in The Star-Spangled Girl. "He had enormous charm and intelligence, the very qualities I wanted to come through in the role he would be playing", said the director. "I was looking for the young Tony of Friendly Persuasion and Fear Strikes Out, not Psycho, although commentators naturally made the comparison between Norman Bates and the character in Pretty Poison."

Semple said "It was very hard to cast. Tuesday was excellent for it but Tony was much too obvious for it. We really tried to find somebody young to do it. We never could find a new, young actor the studio would go with. "

=== Filming ===
The film was shot on location at Great Barrington, Massachusetts, with She Let Him Continue as its working title.

Filming was difficult, with problems between Weld and Black. Actor John Randolph recalled that, "Noel knew how to set up shots, but he knew nothing about acting. Tuesday Weld was neurotic as hell. She would break down and cry. She hated the director, and she permitted that hatred to color everything she did."

Semple later said " I don't think the director used a good deal of imagination on it. I remember the first day of rehearsal. Tuesday Weld was reading her lines and she changed one little thing. Noel wanted her to do the script exactly as it was written. It was very inflexibly done, exactly the way it was written. The best way is somewhere in-between."

In 1971 Weld would call the movie her least favourite:

The least creative experience I ever had. Constant hate, turmoil and dissonance. Not a day went by without a fight. Noel Black, the director, would come up to me before a scene and say, 'Think about Coca-Cola'. I finally said, 'Look, just give the directions to Tony Perkins and he'll interpret for me.

Black later reflected:

Tuesday and Tony got on professionally, though she probably resented how much more in tune he was with me than she was. He was the quintessential professional. Even though he had made 20 or so movies and this was my first, he listened to everything I had to tell him. What he brought was a personal sense of humanity and dignity, which gave the character a sympathetic quality.

Beverly Garland was cast as Weld's mother. "I loved the part", she said later. "I felt it was one of the best things I'd done ... I thought it was a great movie, well directed. Noel Black did a great job. But the studios got very upset with him because it took a long while to shoot. Studio people kept arriving and saying, 'You're taking too long' and they had him under a lot of pressure ... Noel had some wonderful ideas and some camera stuff that took time. He went to great pains with that movie and the studio got very upset with him. But I think the movie shows that he took the time."

== Reception ==
=== Original release ===
Fox had difficulty securing a release for the film in New York so instead opened it in Los Angeles on September 18, 1968. The Los Angeles Times reviewer called it "a small, stunning, thoughtful exploration of degrees of madness and of sanity."

However the film flopped. When Fox did secure a New York release, they claimed they had trouble getting critics to attend a screening, and persuading the two stars to promote the movie.

Black later claimed, "their unwarrantable action was partly explained by it being the year [1968] of the double assassination of Robert Kennedy and Martin Luther King, and a corrosive tale of insidious madness in which a teenage girl shoots her own mother, seemed, to timid studio chiefs, excessive."

The film opened in New York on October 23, to poor reviews from the daily papers. The New York Times claimed that "everything that was spare in the novel somehow becomes overblown" and that while Perkins "is quite good ... Tuesday Weld is numbingly dull as the girl."

=== Critical acclaim ===
It received excellent reviews from magazines and Sunday papers – notably Pauline Kael in The New Yorker – but that was not enough to save the film commercially. A return engagement in Los Angeles in December was not successful.

"One of the best films of 1968 remains a pleasant memory for the few of us lucky enough to see it", wrote Rex Reed, who thought it was "an offbeat, original, totally irreverent examination of violence in America, refreshing in its subtlety and intelligent in its delivery."

Gene Siskel of the Chicago Tribune named the film as one of the ten best of the year.

Lawrence Turman later said "the critics, of all people, rescued Pretty Poison by continually writing about it. It's easy to second guess a studio and it doesn't help. What matters is that the film came off the map from being nothing and nowhere to finding its audience. It's a special film. I'm very proud of it, but like all films it didn't satisfy all my dreams. The direct cost was $1.3 million and I think we'll turn the corner on the television sale."

Semple said "The critical acclaim the film got, Pauline Kael was responsible. Fox opened it without critics screenings, which they do with very bad pictures. They felt it was a total disaster. They opened it on 42nd Street on some semi-porn theater. Pauline and Joe Morgenstern (movie critic for The Wall Street Journal) said. 'Let's go see this one. What movie is so terrible Fox won't let us see it?" Kael decided to beat the studio over the head with it by saying, "This great classic, this wonderful movie..." She seriously over-praised it. "

Review aggregator website Rotten Tomatoes gives it a rare rating of 100% based on 12 reviews.

"I don't care if critics like it; I hated it," Weld later said on it. "I can't like or be objective about films I had a terrible time doing."

=== Box office ===
According to Fox records, the film required $3,600,000 in rentals to break even and by December 11, 1970, had made $2,075,000, so it was a loss for the studio.

== Awards and honors ==
- 1968 New York Film Critics Circle Award, Best Screenplay – Lorenzo Semple Jr.

== See also ==
- List of American films of 1968

== Sources ==
- Silverman, Stephen M (1988). The Fox That Got Away: The Last Days of the Zanuck Dynasty at Twentieth Century-Fox. L. Stuart. ISBN 978-0-818-40485-6.
- Weaver, Tom (2006). Interviews with B Science Fiction and Horror Movie Makers: Writers, Producers, Directors, Actors, Moguls and Makeup. Jefferson, North Carolina: McFarland & Company. ISBN 978-0-786-42858-8.
