= DCL Technology Demonstrator programme =

The US DCL (Detection Classification and Localisation) demonstrator program is aimed at proving that an active torpedo detection system is able to resolve a salvo of torpedoes with sufficient time and accuracy that an anti-torpedo torpedo may be fired back to hit and destroy the threat.

== Overview ==
The DCL systems consist of an active source emitter which sends high-frequency pings into the water. Reflections from in-water objects are received by a towed array tuned to those frequencies. By processing the reflections it is possible to determine whether objects are torpedoes, or non-threat objects.

The system is also combined with a passive acoustic towed array specifically designed for torpedo detection. The passive acoustic array is able to analyse the structured sound emanating from a torpedo and thereby classify the weapon type and mode of operation.

Two teams were building alternative DCL demonstration systems, the first to test was Ultra Electronics who in 2006 successfully resolved a salvo of torpedoes. The second company was APC.

The aim of the programme is to resolve threats sufficiently well that an anti-torpedo torpedo may be fired at the threat to neutralise it (a hard-kill solution). This differs from the UK S2170 Surface Ship Torpedo Defence solution which utilises soft-kill.

== See also ==
- Torpedo defence
- AN/SLQ-25 Nixie § Further development
- SSTD
