= Sieglinde (decoy) =

German WWII sonar decoy

Sieglinde [ˌziːkˈlɪndə] was a sonar decoy used during the Second World War by German U-boats. Sieglinde was installed in chambers on the sides of the U-boat. It could be ejected to a considerable distance from the boat when attempting to hide from a seeker's sonar equipment. The Sieglinde was powered by electric motors, allowing it to move at 6 knots (11 km/h; 6.9 mph) and to periodically ascend or dive, thus imitating the sonar return of an actual submarine. This allowed the real U-boat to slip away quietly from pursuing ships. It was typically used in combination with Pillenwerfer (or Bold) decoys.
