= Bold (decoy) =

German WWII sonar decoy

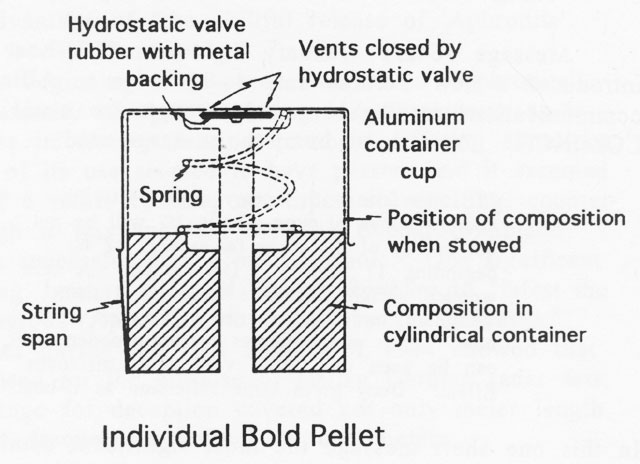
Post-war U.S. diagram of a Bold canister

Bold (also called Bolde, a term derived from kobold) was a German sonar decoy, used by U-boats during the Second World War from 1942 onwards. It consisted of a metal canister about 10 cm (3.9 in) in diameter filled with calcium hydride. It was launched by an ejector system colloquially referred to as Pillenwerfer (English: "pill thrower"). When mixed with seawater, the calcium hydride produced large quantities of hydrogen, which bubbled out of the container, creating a false sonar target. A valve opened and closed, holding the device at a depth of about 30 m (98 ft). The device lasted 20 to 25 minutes. It replicated the echo of an Asdic-sonar submarine contact.

The Royal Navy called it SBT (Submarine Bubble Target).

== See also ==
- Sieglinde
