= AN/SLQ-25 Nixie =

Military towed torpedo decoy system

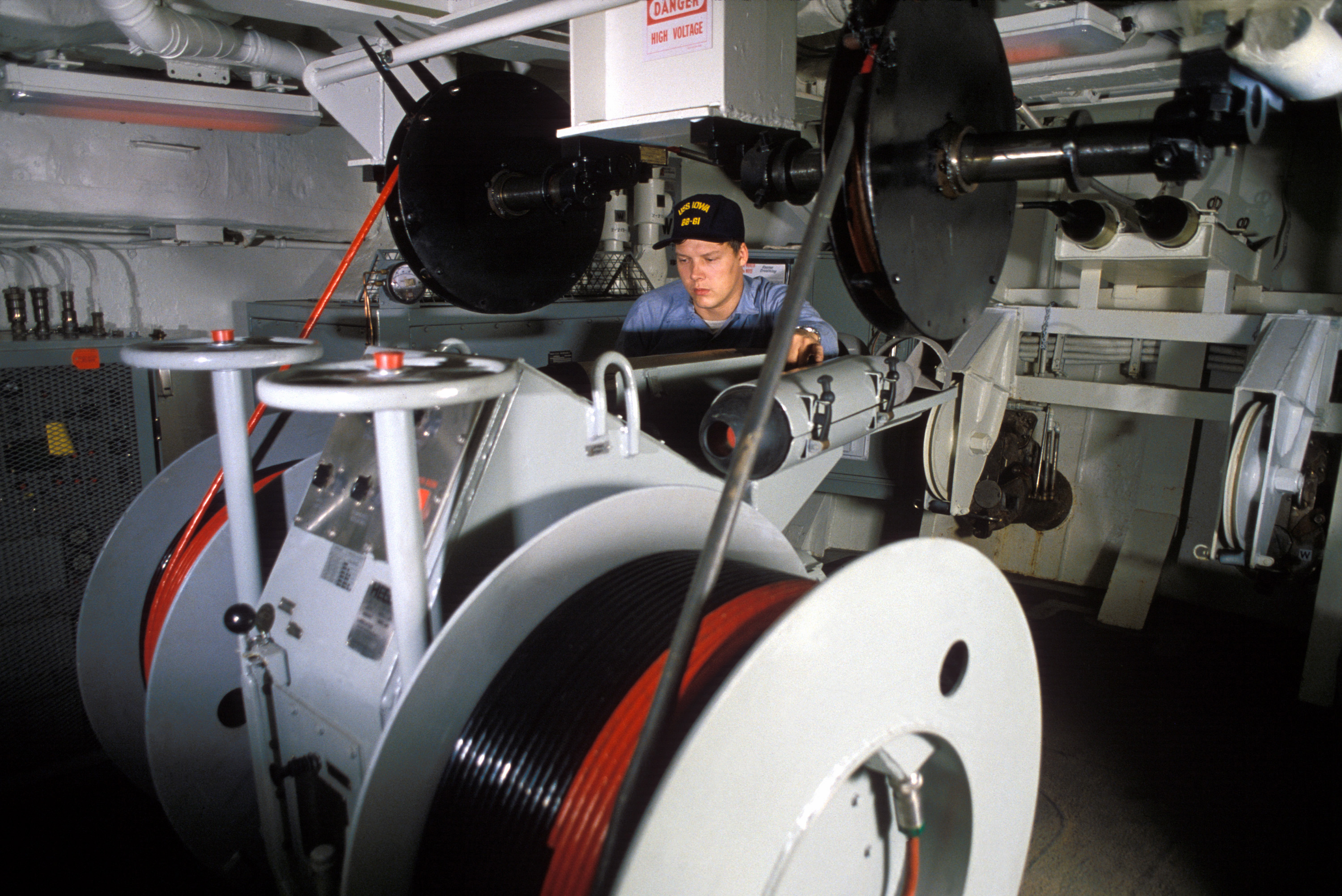
SLQ-25 Nixie aboard USS Iowa

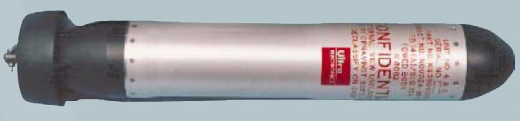
TB-14A towed decoy, from the AN/SLQ-25A/C "Nixie" system

The AN/SLQ-25 Nixie and its variants are towed torpedo decoys used on US and allied warships. It consists of a towed decoy device (TB-14A) and a shipboard signal generator. The Nixie is capable of defeating wake-homing, acoustic-homing, and wire-guided torpedoes. The decoy emits signals to draw a torpedo away from its intended target.

The Nixie attempts to defeat a torpedo's passive sonar by emitting simulated ship noise—such as propeller and engine noise—or defeat a torpedo's active sonar by amplifying and returning its pings. Typically, larger ships may have two Nixie systems mounted at the stern of the ship to allow operation singularly or in pairs while smaller ships may have only one system.

In accordance with the Joint Electronics Type Designation System (JETDS), the "AN/SLQ-25" designation represents the 25th design of an Army-Navy electronic device for waterborne countermeasures special equipment. The JETDS system also now is used to name all Department of Defense electronic systems.

== Variants ==
The AN/SLQ-25A was introduced in 1987. It is a clean-sheet design when compared to the original AN/SLQ-25 Nixie. Apart from a few minor mechanical components, they share no common parts. The AN/SLQ-25A utilises a fiber optic tow cable (FOTC) and a 10-horsepower (7.5 kW) RL-272C double drum winch. Several engineering changes resulted in commercial off-the-shelf (COTS) equipment being utilised extensively in the system. A diagnostic program can be initiated locally or from the remote control station, and tests all electronic functions. The AN/SLQ-25A provides improved deceptive countermeasures capability over the original Nixie.

The AN/SLQ-25B variant includes equipment of the AN/SLQ-25A and introduced a towed array sensor to detect submarines and incoming torpedoes. It also includes a fiber optic display LAN. Previous versions could only simulate ship noise and were effective against passive homing torpedoes but ineffective against active homing torpedoes; the AN/SLQ-25B added the ability to defeat active homing torpedoes by intercepting, amplifying, and returning the sonar pings from the incoming torpedo.

The AN/SLQ-25C was first procured in 2007 and is a general electronics upgrade of the AN/SLQ-25A. The AN/SLQ-25C has additional countermeasure modes, more reliable power amplification, a new COTS signal generator, and a longer, more functional littoral fiber optic tow cable (LFOTC) for operation in shallow water.

The AN/SLQ-25D was a planned upgrade with a contract awarded in 2009. It was to feature an open architecture, allowing it to serve as a host to other systems and support their information gathering and threat detection. In 2012, the AN/SLQ-25D program became a part of the Surface Ship Torpedo Defense (SSTD) program, a US Navy effort to field a system that could detect and destroy incoming torpedoes. The AN/SLQ-25D was redesignated as the AN/SLQ-25X, and it was intended to be the tow point for the torpedo detection sensors. However, the Navy canceled the SSTD program and with it the AN/SLQ-25X in 2018.

In place of the canceled AN/SLQ-25X, AN/SLQ-25E procurement began in 2022. The AN/SLQ-25E addresses obsolescence issues with previous AN/SLQ-25 variants by updating the hardware and software to a COTS-based, modular, and open architecture. The AN/SLQ-25E has improved capability against wake-homing, acoustic-homing, and wire-guided torpedoes. All existing AN/SLQ-25 units are being upgraded to the AN/SLQ-25E baseline.

== Further development ==
Under a joint UK/US memorandum of understanding, the UK MoD and the US DoD are furthering torpedo survivability systems. The US is currently working on an Active Source program called the DCL Technology Demonstrator programme, and the UK has developed and entered into service the S2170 Surface Ship Torpedo Defence system.

An improved torpedo countermeasure system called the AN/SLQ-61 Lightweight Tow (LWT) Torpedo Defense Mission Module (TDMM) is lighter than the AN/SLQ-25 and has a different tow profile, making it more suited for small combatant warships operating in littoral environments. The LWT is a modular, digitally controlled soft kill countermeasure decoy that can defend ships against wake-homing, acoustic-homing, and wire-guided torpedoes.

== See also ==
- List of military electronics of the United States
