= Kitty Winn =

American actress

- Born: Katherine Tupper Winn; February 21, 1943 (age 83); Washington, D.C., U.S.
- Education: Boston University (BA)
- Occupation: Actress
- Years active: 1961–1983, 2011
- Spouse: Morton Winston (m. 1979; div. 2004)
- Children: 1
- Relatives: Katherine Tupper Marshall (grandmother)

Katherine Tupper Winn (born February 21, 1943) is an American retired actress. She is best known for her roles as the heroin addict Helen in the romantic drama The Panic in Needle Park (1971), for which she won the Best Actress Award at the 1971 Cannes Film Festival, and her recurring role of Sharon Spencer in the horror film franchise The Exorcist.

== Early life ==
Winn was born in Washington, D.C., the daughter of Army officer James J. Winn and Molly Pender Brown Winn. She had one brother. Winn traveled widely during much of her childhood, having spent time in the United States, England, Germany, China, India, and Japan. Her mother is the stepdaughter of U.S. General of the Army, former US Secretary of State, and former US Secretary of Defense George C. Marshall and daughter of Katherine Tupper Marshall.

== Career ==
Winn's career has spanned a wide range of dramatic productions on stage, in motion pictures and on television. She studied acting at Centenary Junior College and Boston University, graduating from the latter in 1966. During her college years Winn acted in student productions at Centenary Junior College, Boston University, and Harvard College, and summer stock for two summers at The Priscilla Beach Theatre, south of Boston. Shortly after college she joined the company at American Conservatory Theater in San Francisco, where she remained for four years under the artistic direction of William Ball.

In the fall of 1970 Winn left American Conservatory Theater to star opposite Al Pacino in the film The Panic in Needle Park, for which she won the Best Actress Award at the 1971 Cannes Film Festival. Although she went on to do several more films, including They Might Be Giants (1971) and The Exorcist (1973), she spent most of her career in theater.

She played Cordelia in The Tragedy of King Lear for KCET in 1983, and soon retired from acting. She did not return to the stage again until 2011, when she played the lead in The Last Romance at the San Jose Repertory Theatre. For this performance, she was nominated for a best actress award by the San Francisco Bay Area Theatre Critics Circle.

== Personal life ==
Winn married Los Angeles attorney and businessman Morton Winston in 1978, and they have a child.

== Body of work ==
=== Theatre ===
Year	Production Location	Play	Role
1961	Centenary Junior College	Antigone	Antigone
1963	Priscilla Beach Theatre	Curious Savage	Florence
1963	Priscilla Beach Theatre	Song of Bernadette	Bernadette
1964	Priscilla Beach Theatre	Night of the Iguana	Miss Jenks
1964	Priscilla Beach Theatre	Gigi	Gigi
1964	Priscilla Beach Theatre	Shot in the Dark	Josefa Lantenay
1964	Boston University	Measure for Measure	Mistress Overdon's girl
1964	Boston University	Toys in the Attic	Lily
1965	Boston University	The Rose Tattoo	Rosa
1965	Harvard College	The Beggars' Opera	Polly Peachum
1966	Boston University	The Playboy of the Western World	Pegeen Mike
1967	American Conservatory Theater	The Crucible	Mary Warren
1967	American Conservatory Theater	Thieves' Carnival	Juliette
1967	American Conservatory Theater	Charley's Aunt	Kitty
1968	American Conservatory Theater	Long Day's Journey into Night	Cathleen
1968	American Conservatory Theater	Le Misanthrope	Celemene
1968	American Conservatory Theater	Under Milk Wood	Lily Smalls
1969	American Conservatory Theater	Rosencrantz and Guilderstern Are Dead	Ophelia
1969	American Conservatory Theater	Charley's Aunt	Kitty
1969	ANTE Theatre and American Conservatory Theater	The Three Sisters	Irina
1969	The Mineola Playhouse	Our Town	Emily (also with Henry Fonda) Michael York (actor)
1970	American Conservatory Theater	Glory Hallelujah	Nantelle Bowden
1970	American Conservatory Theater	The Rose Tattoo	Rosa
1970	American Conservatory Theater	The Tempest	Miranda
1972	Long Wharf Theatre, New York Shakespeare in the Park, and Mark Taper Forum	Hamlet	Ophelia (also with Stacy Keach, James Earl Jones and Colleen Dewhurst)
1975	Phoenix Theatre	Knuckle (off-Broadway premier)	Jenny Wilbur (opposite Perry King)
1975	Ahmanson Theatre	Ring Around the Moon	Isabelle (opposite Michael York)
1977	Long Wharf Theatre	St. Joan	Joan
1978	Coconut Grove Playhouse	Othello	Desdemona
1982	Repertory Theatre of Saint Louis	Romeo and Juliet	Juliet
2011	San Jose Repertory Theatre	The Last Romance	Carol

=== Motion pictures ===
Year	Name of Film	Role
1971	The Panic in Needle Park	Helen Reeves
1972	They Might be Giants	Grace
1973	The Exorcist	Sharon Spencer
1976	Peeper	Marianne Prendergast
1977	Exorcist II: The Heretic	Sharon Spencer
1978	Mirrors	Marianne Whitman

=== Movies for television ===
Year	Name of Film	Role
1970	The House That Would Not Die	Sara Dunning
1972	The Life of Harriet Beecher Stowe	Harriet
1973	Message to My Daughter	Miranda Thatcher
1974	The Carpenters	Sissy
1975	Miles to Go Before I Sleep	Maggie Stanton
1977	The Last Hurrah	Maeve Skeffington
1983	The Tragedy of King Lear	Cordelia

=== Series for television ===
Year	Name of Series	Role
1973	The Streets of San Francisco	Barbara Talmadge
1975	Beacon Hill	Rosamond Lassiter
1977	Kojak - "Kojak Days: Part 1"	Carla Magid
1977	Kojak - "Kojak Days: Part 2"	Carla Magid

== Awards ==
Year	Award	Nominated work	Category	Result
1971	Cannes Film Festival Awards	Helen in The Panic in Needle Park	Best Actress Award (Prix d'interprétation féminine)	Won
