= Fanfare (decoy) =

American towed sonar decoy

The T-Mk 6 Fanfare is a towed sonar decoy developed after the Second World War by the United States Navy. It replaced the Foxer noisemaker. It was more effective than the Foxer, producing a sound similar to a ship's propeller, rather than wideband noise.

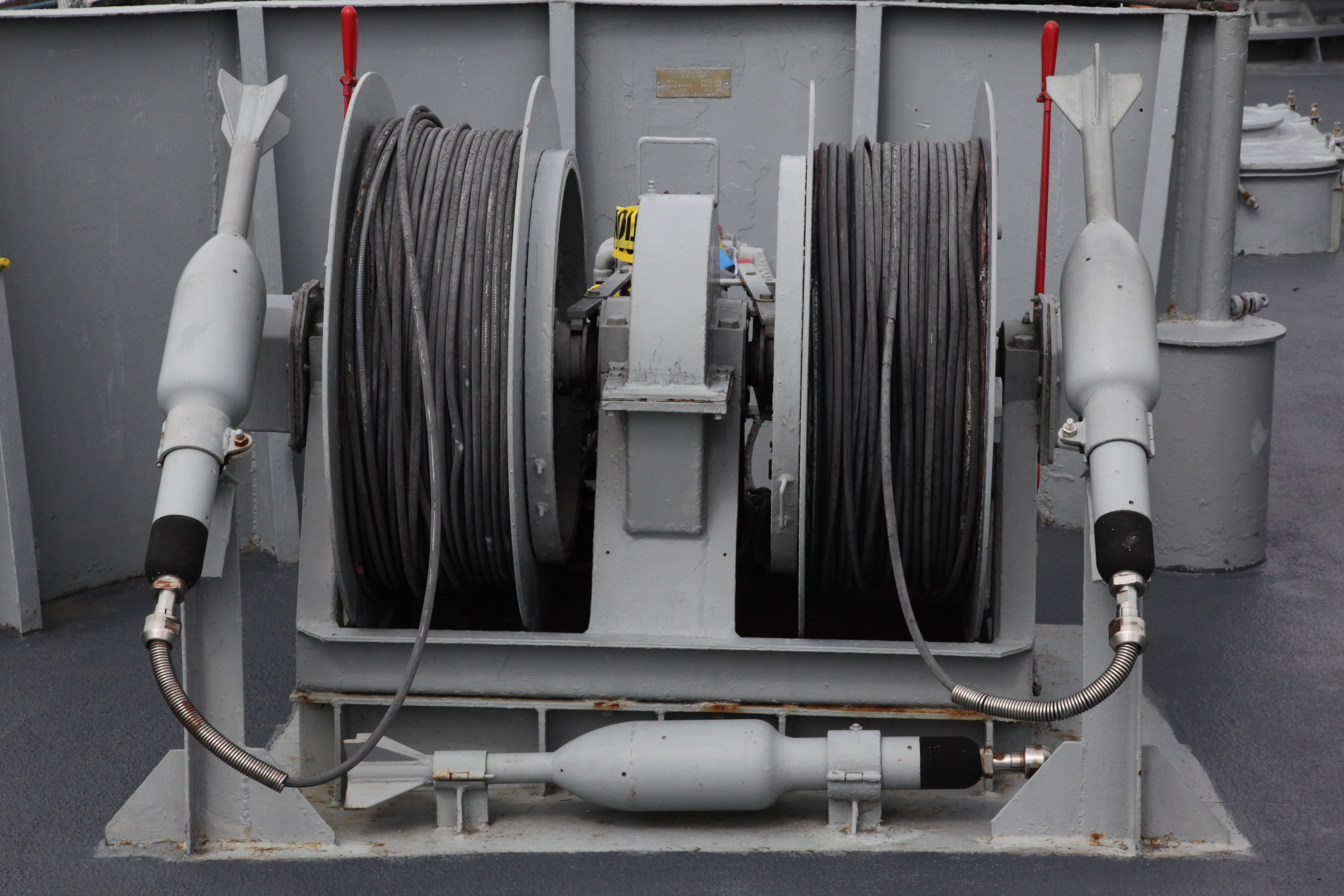
Winches and decoys on board USS Cassin Young

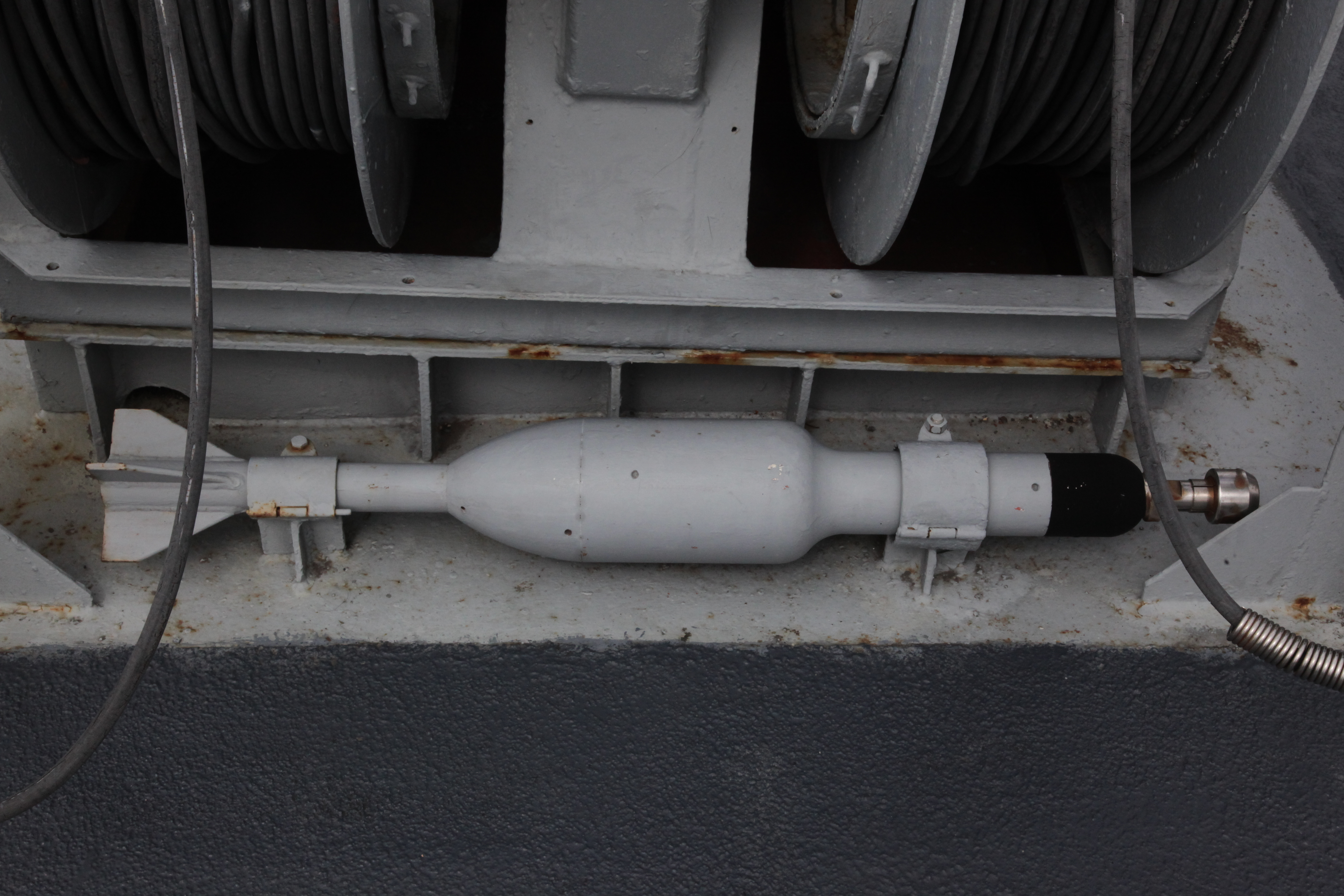
A towed decoy on board USS Cassin Young
