= Mobile submarine simulator =

American sonar decoy

The mobile submarine simulator (MOSS) MK70 is a sonar decoy used by submarines of the United States Navy. It was a 10-inch vehicle, without an explosive warhead, but able to generate both an active sonar echo and a passive sound signature recorded to be extremely similar to that of the launching submarine. The purpose of MOSS was to create multiple targets all with the same acoustic signature.

MOSS was originally developed by Gould until Westinghouse acquired that division. Some current underwater training targets are modeled after MOSS's design.

The MOSS first entered service in 1976 and was deployed on all American ballistic missile submarines from the 1980s until it was withdrawn in the mid 1990s.

== See also ==
- ADM-160 MALD
