= Elizabeth Killick =

British naval electronics engineer (1924–2019)

- fair use image only
- Born: 10 September 1924; London, England
- Died: 7 July 2019 (aged 94); Stoughton, West Sussex, England
- Education: University of St Andrews
- Known for: Naval electronics engineering
- Scientific career
- Workplaces: Women's Auxiliary Air Force; Admiralty Signals and Radar Establishment; Admiralty Underwater Weapons Establishment; General Electric Company

Elizabeth "Betty" Audrey Killick (10 September 1924 – 7 July 2019) FREng was a British naval electronics engineer who worked on radar and weapons systems for the Ministry of Defence. In 1982, she became the first woman to be elected a Fellow of the Royal Academy of Engineering.

== Early life ==
Killick was born in Brixton Hill, London, to Winifred (née Baines) and George Killick. Her father was a chartered accountant who was appointed to the Order of the British Empire in 1954 for service to the Cotton Board. Her maternal grandfather was a political agent, and her mother's brothers worked for the London Stock Exchange. Killick attended Streatham and Clapham High School. She moved with her family to Cheshire during World War II to avoid the Blitz. Her mother died when Killick was still in her teens.

== Career ==
Killick joined the Women's Auxiliary Air Force in about 1942 and worked as a radar mechanic. When she was demobilized in 1947, Killick was briefly at the Royal Air Force Institute of Aviation Medicine as a laboratory assistant, before going to the University of St Andrews where she earned a degree in natural philosophy in 1951 and was awarded an honorary doctorate in 1998.

In 1951 Killick joined the Admiralty Signals and Radar Establishment, near Portsmouth, working in a group which later became the Antenna Division, and was noted there for her work on innovative defence radar and sonar systems. By 1966 she had risen to the civil service grade of Senior Principal Scientific Officer – and was the first woman to achieve this rank – although the ASRE had by then been absorbed into the Admiralty Surface Weapons Establishment (ASWE). Her work was of course highly secret but in 1967 she made one of only a few public presentations of her work, a paper on Radar Techniques at a meeting of the Portsmouth and District Physical Society on 8 March 1967.

She joined the Admiralty Underwater Weapons Establishment (AUWE) in 1969, in which year she was also allowed to present some more of her work, on microwave antenna arrays, at the 1st European Microwave Conference. At the AUWE she worked on the radar systems used in Royal Navy warships, as well as the torpedoes used in submarines and aircraft. She concentrated on defence and radar systems before moving to torpedoes development. The provision of radar to the Royal Navy was the remit of ASWE. The AUWE's work was in investigating future techniques and technologies, such as homing, propulsion and guidance systems for the torpedoes, which were eventually incorporated into Spearfish and Sting Ray torpedoes deployed by submarines, helicopters and other aircraft. In 1976 she was promoted to Deputy Chief Scientific Officer and Head of the Underwater Weapons Department at AUWE.

During her time at the AUWE, the main building became known as Betty's Hilton because of Killick's presence. She did not like being considered a "woman engineer"; and would not permit the Women's Engineering Society to interview her. Whilst she preferred being known for her excellence, not her gender, she worked to promote equality during her time at the AUWE. This included removing a rule claiming women must wear skirts.

In 1980, Killick was elected Fellow of the Institution of Electrical Engineers, and was the first woman to be elected to the Royal Academy of Engineering in 1982, by which time she had, according to her entry in the Oxford Dictionary of National Biography, "attained a level of seniority which was unparalleled among women in engineering at the time". She served as a board member for the Marine Technology Directorate, where she coordinated projects between the government, academia and industry. After leaving the AUWE, Killick joined the General Electric Company, who were building the torpedoes developed by Killick. She did not get on well with Arnold Weinstock and left the organisation.

== Personal life ==
Killick lived in Stoughton, West Sussex. Her recreational interests included sailing, skiing, beer drinking and local history. Killick was described as "a brilliant, if somewhat volatile, engineer who was both terrifying and inspiring to her colleagues" but who was at the same time "a formidable authority" with a strong sense of humour. She died at Stoughton of a heart attack on 7 July 2019.

== Publications ==
- A temperature independent frequency scanning antenna. Croney J., Killick E.A., Foster D. 1st European Microwave Conference. Date of Conference: 8-12 Sept. 1969.
- A cylindrical array for electronic scanning, Small, B.I.; Killick, E.A.; Croney, J.: in Proc.1st European Microwave Conference, 1969, 133–136.
- The Design of Waveguide Arrays Providing Sum and Difference Beams and Suitable for Scanning in One Plane. EA Killick, H Salt, NE Porter. 1st European Microwave Conference, 1969
- Radiation of Dual Polarisation from Linear Arrays. EA Killick, KA Zoledziowski. 1st European Microwave Conference, 1969
- A Ferrite Controlled Phase Scanning Microwave Antenna. EA Killick, GJ Colley, WD Delany, 1st European Microwave Conference 1969
- Scanning and active antennas. EA Killick - 1969 1st European Microwave Conference, 1969
- The Design and Production of Latched Ferrite Phase Shifters for Electronic Scanning and for High Power. EA Killick, GJ Colley, JA Eddles. 1st European Microwave Conference 1969
- Electronically Scanned Antenna Systems: Pt2. A.E. Killick, D.E.N.Davies. AGARDograph 100, 417–431, 1966.
- An Electronically Steered Radar Aerial. By G. T. Colley, J. A. Eddies, B. R . Gladman and A. E. Killick. JRNSS Vol 22, No 2 1967
