= Nyman Levin =

British physicist

Nyman Levin (17 February 1906 – 25 January 1965) was a British physicist who was Director of the Atomic Weapons Research Establishment from 1959 to 1965.

== Personal ==
Nyman Levin was born in London, the son of Leibisch Levin and Annie Levene; there was one brother, Barnett, and several half-siblings, Annie, Fanny, Solomon and Mary. He married Dora and the couple had three children.

== Education ==
Levin attended the Central Foundation Boys' School, where he specialised in physics. For four years after leaving school, he went to evening classes at Sir John Cass' College while working in the family firm. His studies continued with a London County Council scholarship to Imperial College.

== Career ==
He joined Marconi's in 1930, to work on optical systems for television; after five years on the task and the award of his PhD, he switched to klystrons and UHF and centimetre waves. At the outbreak of World War II, Levin was recruited into military research and made a "significant contribution" to the development of radar, at the H H Wills Physics Laboratory at the University of Bristol.

Radar research and development continued at the Admiralty Signal Establishment at Haslemere after 1941. Two years later, Levin led a project to establish VHF systems along the south coast of England to support the D-Day landings and the subsequent campaign. There were also ground-breaking experiments with signals beyond line of sight. Despite his lack of practical experience in this field, Levin's project was highly successful.

After the war, Levin stayed with the Royal Naval Scientific Service, attracted by the scope of the work. He moved to the Admiralty Research Laboratory at Teddington and resumed his specialism in optics, taking charge of the instrumentation and optics group. In this role, naval instruments were developed, including radar displays that incorporated maps. He was appointed Superintendent of the Admiralty Gunnery Establishment in 1951 and while he was in this post, sea-borne control systems for the Sea Slug missile were successfully developed and implemented. However, his interest had moved to managing people and administration.

In search of new challenges, Levin left the scientific civil service in 1955 and joined Rank Precision Industries as Chief of Research and Development with a remit to find and develop new product ranges. Levin found this task highly stimulating, finding and promoting new projects and establishing a substantial research team. By now, he did not lead detailed work, preferring to employ good subordinates and to trust their methods. This period in private industry enabled him to learn about its associated problems and methods.

The offer, in 1958, of the post of Deputy Director at the Atomic Weapons Research Establishment at Aldermaston, posed a difficult choice for Levin but nuclear physics was another new field for him and the novelty attracted him. He was soon appointed Director and held this post until 1965.

== Espionage fears ==
Levin was Jewish and was investigated by MI5 about passing nuclear secrets to Israel. His government records are still secret fifty years after his death.

== Death ==
Nyman Levin died on 26 January 1965 in London of a heart attack, a week after being appointed as a member of the Atomic Energy Authority.
