= Admiralty Compass Observatory =

Historical department of British Navy

Department overview
- Formed: 1842
- Preceding Department: Compass Department
- Dissolved: 1971
- Superseding Department: Admiralty Surface Weapons Establishment
- Jurisdiction: Government of the United Kingdom
- Headquarters: Admiralty Building; Whitehall; London
- Parent Department: Admiralty; Navy Department

The Admiralty Compass Observatory was a department of the British Royal Navy. It was established in 1842 to provide the Royal Navy with services for the design, development, inspection, testing and repair of compasses and certain other instruments. It subsequently undertook requirements for the other services as appropriate. Lord Kelvin is said to have called it 'the Temple of Accuracy'.

The observatory was administered by the Compass Branch (1842–1917), later known as the Compass Department (1917–1968) and Compass Directorate (1968–1971). It was afterwards absorbed within the Admiralty Surface Weapons Establishment, but continued to operate at its original site until the early 1980s.

== History ==
In 1795, the post of Hydrographer of the Navy was created. He became responsible to the First Naval Lord for producing charts, 'Sailing Directions', 'Notices to Mariners', tide tables and light lists and for supplying chronometers, compasses and other scientific instruments to HM ships. He was also responsible for naval meteorology and for the Admiralty's links with the Meteorological Office. In 1820, the Hydrographer became responsible for the Royal Observatory, being advised by a Board of Visitors.

=== Charlton ===
In 1842, a Compass Branch was established as part of the Hydrographic Department, and a compass observatory was set up in a garden behind a house in Hawkins Terrace, off Maryon Road, Charlton, not far from the Royal Navy's Dockyard at Woolwich. Captain Edward Johnson led the project and appointed a retired Scottish Artillery Sergeant, James Nathaniel Brunton to live in the house and tend the observatory. This was an octagonal wooden structure "rather like a summer house", which had to be free of iron. It had two shutters in the roof and three masonry pedestals to hold instruments. Two were used to determine true north; the other held compasses being tested. Johnson died in 1853 and Brunton continued to run the Observatory but never attained the rank of Acting Superintendent.

=== Deptford ===
In 1869 Woolwich Dockyard closed, and the observatory was moved to the Naval Victualling Yard at Deptford. The Superintendent had his residence and office on the site (above which he maintained a small museum, containing 'the first water-compass, made by a Feversham optician, and [...] a number of compasses which have been on Polar expeditions, or round the world with the Challenger'). The observatory building itself had been transferred to the site from Charlton, together with the associated equipment. The simple wooden structure, around 15 ft (4.6 m) in diameter, stood in the central open square of the victualling establishment. No iron was permitted in or near the building. Brunton continued in his role at Deptford but stayed in the Maryon Road house for another year after which he was given a lodging allowance; in 1871 he was living in The Terrace at Deptford Dockyard and was Assistant Superintendent of Compasses. He eventually was forced to retire, aged over 80, in 1883.

In 1895, Arthur Quiller-Couch described the operation of the observatory on a visit to the establishment:

'Within the room are three stone pillars in line with a mark on a wall outside, and 110 feet away. The compass to be tested is placed on the first table, and its bearing ascertained by aligning sights upon this mark. On the second table is a telescopic sight, by which the movements of a very delicate magnet on the third table can be ascertained. The degrees of variation for Deptford (usually about 17°) can be read of a scale and correction applied'.

After testing ashore, the compass was then tested again aboard its ship, which was moored (usually off Greenhithe) and swung on its moorings through all points of the compass, with bearings being taken on a fixed landmark ashore. Other forms of testing were also routinely employed. Ships compasses were tested in this way at Deptford every three to four years. Further to this, the Superintendent received regular reports 'from every British war-ship in every corner of the world'. Compasses for use on smaller vessels such as rowing boats, where less precision was required, were also tested on site, but using smaller-scale equipment in the Superintendent's office.

In 1911, the Compass Branch was removed from the Department of the Hydrographer of the Navy, and affiliated instead to the Controller of the Navy's Department; at the same time its work in connection with terrestrial magnetism was transferred to the Royal Observatory Greenwich.

=== Ditton Park ===
In 1917, the observatory was moved to Ditton Park near Slough and used the house and its immediate grounds when the compass branch was elevated to a department. The Radio Research Station of the Department of Scientific and Industrial Research was co-located at Ditton Park, and provided basic information in this field. By 1968 it formed part of the Controllers Department and was renamed the Compass Directorate. In 1971, it was merged as part of the Admiralty Surface Weapons Establishment (ASWE) within the navigation division. The site was later renamed as Admiralty Research Establishment (ARE) Slough, and in its final years its became part of the Defence Research Agency (DRA) from 1991, and the Defence Evaluation and Research Agency (DERA) from 1995. After its release from Defence use, the whole site was bought by Computer Associates (now CA Technologies) in 1997.

Commander Fanning wrote a history of the establishment.

== Head of branch/department ==
=== Superintendent of Compasses ===
Incomplete list of post holders included:

1. 1842–1843 Commander Edward John Johnson
2. 1844–1847 Captain Edward John Johnson
3. 1855–1860 Captain Sir Frederick John Owen Evans
4. 1868–1885 Captain Ettrick William Creak
5. 1914–1919 Captain Frank O. Creagh-Osborne (rtd).

==== Assistant Superintendent of Compasses ====
1. 1868–1867 Lieutenant E. W. Creak
2. 1871–1883 Sergeant James Nathaniel Brunton
3. 1909–1913 Commander Frank Osborne Creagh-Osborne
4. 1913–1915 Commander Stanley B. Norfolk
