= Admiralty Underwater Weapons Establishment =

Brirish naval research institution

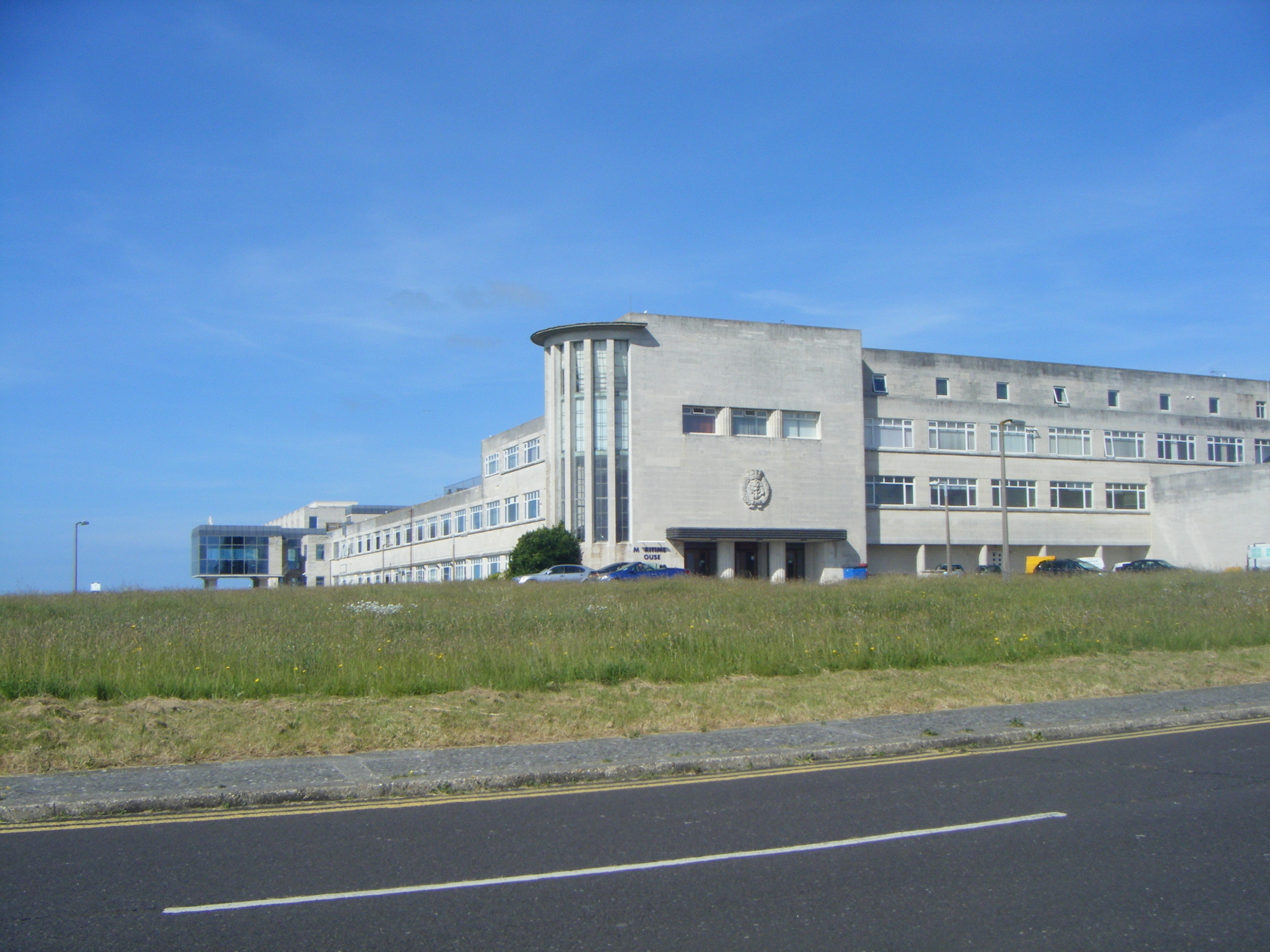
- AUWE(S) as it remains today (now the Southwell Business Park)

Establishment overview
- Formed: 1959
- Dissolved: 1984
- Superseding Establishment: Admiralty Research Establishment
- Type: Establishment
- Headquarters: 50°31′45″N 2°27′9″W

The Admiralty Underwater Weapons Establishment was an Admiralty research department dedicated to underwater detection systems and weapons. It was formed at the Isle of Portland in 1959 and later became part of the Admiralty Research Agency (ARE) in 1984.

== History ==
In 1959, Portland's Admiralty Gunnery Establishment was transferred to Portsdown Hill, allowing the research at Portland to focus on anti-submarine research and underwater weapons. The Admiralty Underwater Weapons Establishment was formed in 1959 by the transfer of a number of Admiralty research establishments to Portland, including:

- the Underwater Launching Establishment at Bournemouth
- the Torpedo Experimental Establishment at Greenock
- the Underwater Countermeasures and Weapons Establishment at Havant

The Underwater Detection Establishment at Portland was then itself amalgamated into the AUWE the following year.

This amalgamation saw all research into underwater weapons and detection systems concentrated at Portland by 1960, with two primary sites forming the AUWE: "AUWE (North)" and "AUWE (South)". The North site, located at Portland's Naval Base, was formerly the HM Underwater Detection Establishment; the South site, located at Southwell, was formerly the Admiralty Gunnery Establishment. The Torpedo Experimental Establishment took over the facilities and staff of the former Royal Naval Torpedo Depot Weymouth at Bincleaves (the closure of which coincided with the Establishment's move from Scotland); this site became known as AUWE(B).

The work carried out at Portland had the highest security classification during the Cold War. In 1961, the two establishments were the centre of worldwide attention, after the discovery of espionage infiltration. This became infamously known as the Portland spy ring, a Soviet spy ring that operated in England from the late 1950s until 1961 when the core of the network were arrested by the British security services.

In 1984, the AUWE became part of the Admiralty Research Agency (ARE) and later the Defence Research Agency (DRA) in 1991. With the end of the Cold War in 1991, both Portland's naval base and the two research establishments closed in 1995. AUWE(S) was sold and became the Southwell Business Park in 1997, while AUWE(N) was demolished around 2005.

== See also ==
- MOD Portland Bill
