= RDV 01 Crystal =

History

United Kingdom
- Name: RDV 01 Crystal
- Operator: Under dockyard control
- Ordered: December 1969
- Builder: Devonport Dockyard
- Launched: March 1971
- Commissioned: 30 November 1971
- Fate: Sold, 18 September 1992

General characteristics
- Type: Research vessel
- Displacement: 3,040 long tons (3,089 t)
- Length: 413 ft 6 in (126.03 m)
- Beam: 56 ft (17 m)
- Draught: 5 ft 6 in (1.68 m)
- Propulsion: None
- Complement: 60 including research personnel
- Armament: None

RDV 01 Crystal was a research vessel of the Royal Navy. An unpowered floating platform, it was designed to be used during sonar research and development projects at the Admiralty Underwater Weapons Establishment (AUWE) at Portland Harbour, Dorset. It was not fitted with any propulsion or steering gear.

Ordered from the builders HM Dockyard, Devonport, in December 1969, it was launched in March 1971. It was sold on 18 September 1992 to a Dutch concern.
