= British 18-inch torpedo =

British weapon used by ships, submarines, and aircraft

There have been a number of 18-inch (45cm) torpedoes in service with the Royal Navy of the United Kingdom.

These have been used on ships of the Royal Navy and aircraft of both the Fleet Air Arm and Royal Air Force, while Royal Navy surface ships and submarines use 21-inch torpedoes.

The British 18-inch torpedoes were 17.72 inches (45.0 cm) in diameter, beginning with the "Fiume" Whitehead torpedo of 1890.

== Fiume Mark I ==
Purchased from Whitehead with the first delivery in 1890, and a second delivery in 1891. The weapon utilised compressed air propulsion, and was prolific for its time, having been exported to multiple other navies across the world. The decision to adopt the 18-inch torpedo calibre was made by the Admiralty in 1889, with the Fiume Mark I being the first weapon of the type, soon thereafter followed by the RGF Mark I.

In 1890, Whitehead established a torpedo factory in Weymouth, chiefly for the export market - but also in order to directly supply the Royal Navy with locally-manufactured weapons. The factory initially manufactured various Fiume torpedoes, up to Mark III.

Specifications:

Fiume Mark I Short

- Entered service: 1890
- Weight: 845 lb (383 kg)
- Length: 11 ft 8 in (3.56 m)
- Explosive charge: 118.5 lb (53.8 kg) Wet guncotton
- Range and speed: 800 yd (730 m) at 26 kn (48 km/h)

Fiume Mark I Long

- Evaluation date: 1889
- Weight: 1,140 lb (520 kg)
- Length: 16 ft 5 in (5.00 m)
- Explosive charge: 201 lb (91 kg) Wet guncotton
- Range and speed: 400 yd (370 m) at 32 kn (59 km/h), 800 yd (730 m) at 20 kn (37 km/h)
- Notes: Not adopted for service; acquired for testing only. Related to the Japanese Type 30.

== Fiume Mark II ==
Purchased from Whitehead. Compressed air propulsion. The Fiume Mark II was requested by the Royal Navy Admiralty as it became available in 1893, with the condition that the weapon's top speed would be increased up to 28 knots. Whitehead resisted, but accepted with the stipulation that their upcoming Fiume Mark III would also be purchased. The torpedoes were delivered in 1894. In 1896, the Mark II was adjusted for slightly greater speed. In 1902, the Mark II* was produced, with improvements to its speed, reliability, and a less expensive steel afterbody.

Specifications:

Fiume Mark II

- Entered service: 1894
- Weight: 1,151 lb (522 kg)
- Length: 16 ft 8 in (5.08 m)
- Explosive charge: 229 lb (104 kg) Wet guncotton
- Range and speed: 600 yd (550 m) at 28.75 kn (53.25 km/h), 800 yd (730 m) at 27.75 kn (51.39 km/h), 1,000 yd (910 m) at 23.75 kn (43.99 km/h)

Fiume Mark II*

- Entered service: 1902
- Weight: 1,200 lb (540 kg) (approximate)
- Length: 16 ft 8 in (5.08 m)
- Explosive charge: 229 lb (104 kg) Wet guncotton
- Range and speed: 1,000 yd (910 m) at 28 kn (52 km/h), 3,000 yd (2,700 m) at 15 kn (28 km/h) (approximate)
- Notes: Steel afterbody and improvements to valves and depth-keeping. Performance figures retrieved from the Japanese Type 32.

== Fiume Mark III ==
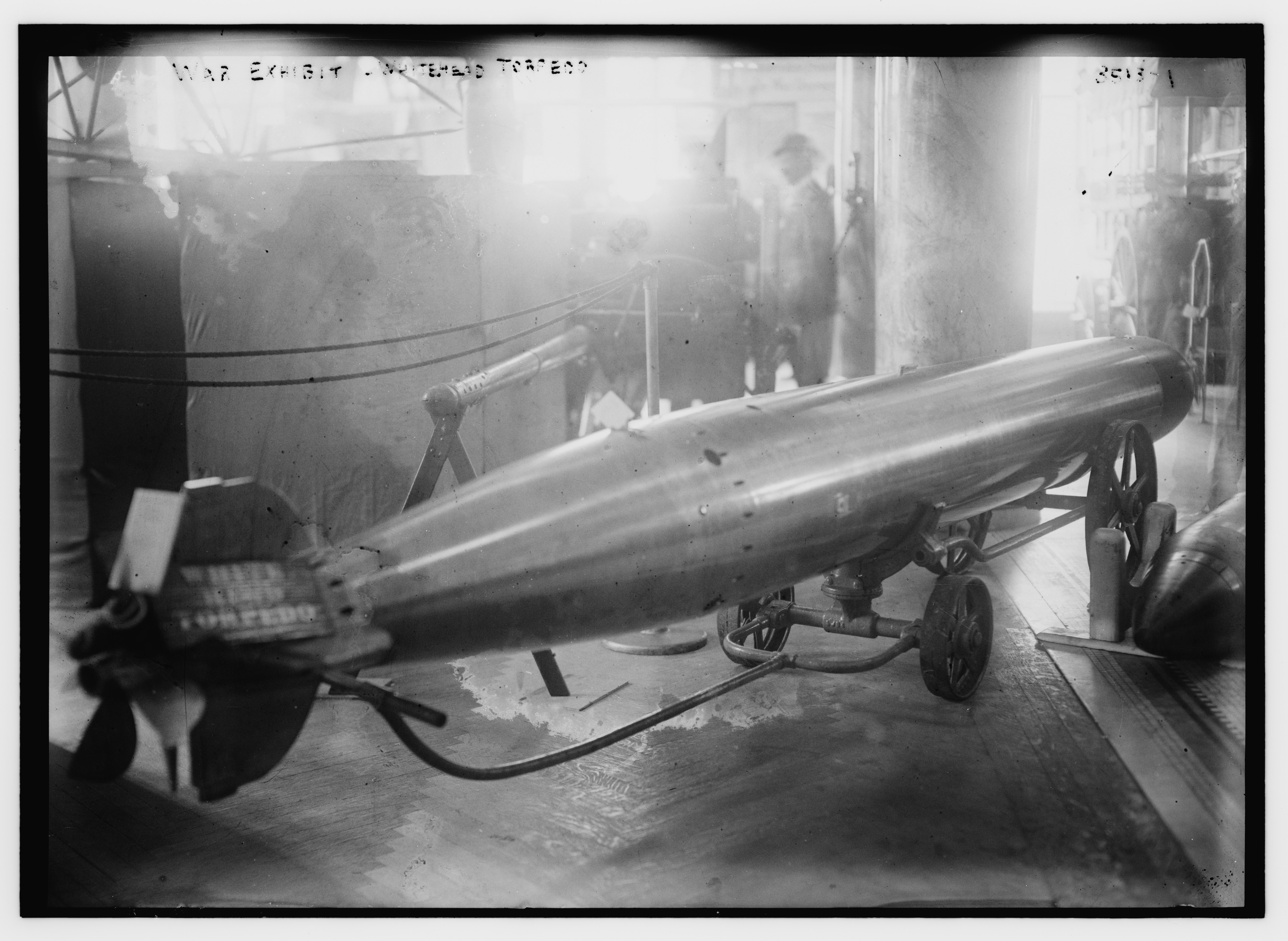
An 18-inch Fiume Mark III of the United States Navy, at the Peace and Preparation Conference in 1915.

Purchased from Whitehead, the final generation of Whitehead torpedoes designed at the facility in Fiume which were purchased by the Royal Navy. Developed in 1903, in production in 1904. Compressed air propulsion, progressively converted to dry heater propulsion beginning in 1909. The Fiume Mark III was the most prolific variant of Whitehead torpedoes after the turn of the century, exported worldwide; some units remained in service decades later. In 1940 a strait defence torpedo emplacement of the Oscarsborg Fortress sank the German heavy cruiser Blücher during the Battle of Drøbak Sound using multiple hits by Fiume Mark III torpedoes.

Different versions of the Mark III had letter designations denoting their compatibility with various launch tube hardware and other functional properties. Among these were "SL" (side lug), "HB" (hook bracket), "SR" (short range), "LR" (long range), "VB" (foreign-specification submerged launch tubes designed by Elswick). The designation "H" was also used to denote conversion to dry heater propulsion.

In 1919 it was approved to break up and scrap all remaining stocks of 18-inch Whitehead (Fiume) and Weymouth torpedoes possessed by the Royal Navy.

Specifications:

Fiume Mark III and Fiume Mark III HB

- Entered service: 1904
- Weight: 1,406 lb (638 kg)
- Length: 16 ft 8 in (5.08 m)
- Explosive charge: 205 lb (93 kg) Wet guncotton
- Range and speed: 1,000 yd (910 m) at 32 kn (59 km/h), 1,500 yd (1,400 m) at 28.6 kn (53.0 km/h), 2,000 yd (1,800 m) at 25.2 kn (46.7 km/h), 3,000 yd (2,700 m) at 20–21 kn (37–39 km/h)
- Notes: The hook bracket variant had a warhead charge of 200 lb (91 kg) and an overall weight of 1,398 lb (634 kg).

Fiume Mark III* SLSR and Fiume Mark III* SLLR

- Entered service: 1906
- Weight: 1,398 lb (634 kg)
- Length: 16 ft 4 in (4.98 m)
- Explosive charge: 200 lb (91 kg) Wet guncotton
- Range and speed: 1,000 yd (910 m) at 33.5 kn (62.0 km/h), 2,000 yd (1,800 m) at 26.5 kn (49.1 km/h) (SR), 2,000 yd (1,800 m) at 24.5 kn (45.4 km/h), 3,000 yd (2,700 m) at 20 kn (37 km/h) (LR)
- Notes: Range and speed data for SLLR extrapolated using previous and successive figures.

Fiume Mark III** SR, Fiume Mark III** LR and Fiume Mark III** VB

- Entered service: 1906
- Weight: 1,393 lb (632 kg)
- Length: 17 ft 4 in (5.28 m)
- Explosive charge: 200 lb (91 kg) Wet guncotton
- Range and speed: 1,000 yd (910 m) at 35 kn (65 km/h), 4,000 yd (3,700 m) at 22 kn (41 km/h) (SR), 2,000 yd (1,800 m) at 28.75 kn (53.25 km/h), 4,000 yd (3,700 m) at 21 kn (39 km/h) (LR), 2,000 yd (1,800 m) at 26.25 kn (48.62 km/h), 4,000 yd (3,700 m) at 19 kn (35 km/h) (VB)
- Notes: The SR and LR variants existed in both HB and SL versions. VB had an overall weight of 1,401 lb (635 kg). During the First World War, the VB variant was issued to HMS Gorgon (1914) and HMS Glatton (1914).

Fiume Mark III** H SL and Fiume Mark III** H HB

- Entered service: 1909
- Weight: 1,423 lb (645 kg) (SL), 1,426 lb (647 kg) (HB)
- Length: 16 ft 8 in (5.08 m)
- Explosive charge: 200 lb (91 kg) Wet guncotton
- Range and speed: 3,000 yd (2,700 m) at 27.5 kn (50.9 km/h) (SL), 3,000 yd (2,700 m) at 29.5 kn (54.6 km/h) (HB)
- Notes: Dry heater conversions of older torpedoes, capable of a single speed setting only due to the limitations of their engines having originally been designed for compressed air. As of 1913, these weapons were allocated to HMS Shannon and HMS Cochrane.

== RGF Mark I ==
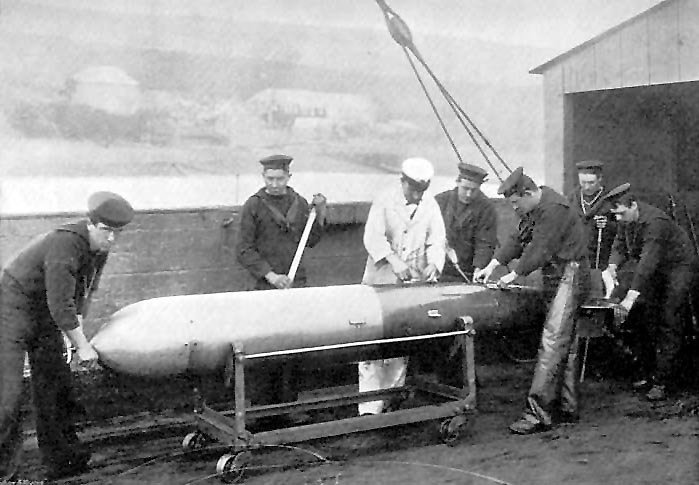
An 18-inch RGF Mark I Short being prepared for an exercise.

A development of the earlier Fiume Mark I purchased from Whitehead, manufactured at the Royal Gun Factory in Woolwich. Existed in a "Short" and "Long" configuration. Manufacture began in 1891, with first deliveries taking place in 1892. Like its predecessor, the weapon utilised compressed air propulsion. Variants in service were denoted according to the launch tube hardware required for their employment, such as "SL" (side lug) or "HB" (hook bracket).

Specifications:

RGF Mark I Short

- Entered service: 1892
- Weight: 831 lb (377 kg)
- Length: 12 ft 4 in (3.76 m)
- Explosive charge: 200 lb (91 kg) Wet guncotton
- Range and speed: 600 yd (550 m) at 31 kn (57 km/h)

RGF Mark I Long

- Entered service: 1892
- Weight: 1,170 lb (530 kg)
- Length: 16 ft 5 in (5.00 m)
- Explosive charge: 200 lb (91 kg) Wet guncotton
- Range and speed: 800 yd (730 m) at 31 kn (57 km/h)

== RGF Mark II ==
Developed at the Royal Gun Factory in 1893 as a lengthened version of the RGF Mark I. The Mark II had a strengthened head joint, a modified balance chamber for steadier running and was capable of a greater range of depth settings - 5 to 22 ft (1.5 to 6.7 m).

By the end of the First World War in 1918, only 33 units of the RGF Mark II remained in Royal Navy stockpiles, and it was approved to break up 12 of them for scrap that year.

Specifications:

RGF Mark II

- Entered service: 1893
- Weight: 1,227 lb (557 kg)
- Length: 16 ft 8 in (5.08 m)
- Explosive charge: 188 lb (85 kg) Wet guncotton
- Range and speed: 800 yd (730 m) at 30.5 kn (56.5 km/h)

RGF Mark II*

- Entered service: 1894
- Weight: 1,230 lb (560 kg) (approximate)
- Length: 16 ft 8 in (5.08 m)
- Explosive charge: 188 lb (85 kg) Wet guncotton
- Range and speed: 800 yd (730 m) at 30.5 kn (56.5 km/h), 1,500 yd (1,400 m) at 20.25 kn (37.50 km/h) (HB) or 1,500 yd (1,400 m) at 21.75 kn (40.28 km/h) (SL)

== Weymouth Mark I ==
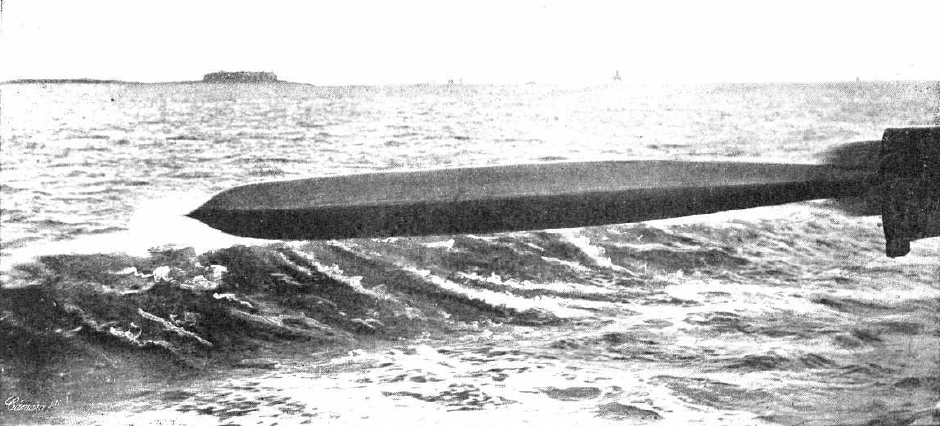
Launch of a Weymouth Mark I during a training exercise in 1914.

The Weymouth Mark I was the first Whitehead heated torpedo, a modification of a Fiume Mark III, first demonstrated in 1905 and put into series production the same year. Produced in the SL (side lug) variant, originally for use by torpedo boats; with the outbreak of the First World War, became reassigned to submarines due to urgent demand.

Specifications:

Weymouth Mark I SL

- Entered service: 1905
- Propulsion: Dry heater
- Weight: 1,493 lb (677 kg)
- Length: 17 ft 6 in (5.33 m)
- Explosive charge: 198 lb (90 kg) Wet guncotton
- Range and speed: 1,000 yd (910 m) at 41 kn (76 km/h), 4,000 yd (3,700 m) at 28.5 kn (52.8 km/h)
- Notes: The world's first heated torpedo, demonstrated in 1905 at Bincleaves to an audience of British and Japanese experts.

Weymouth Mark I* SL

- Entered service: 1909
- Propulsion: Dry heater
- Weight: 1,426 lb (647 kg)
- Length: 17 ft 6 in (5.33 m)
- Explosive charge: 198 lb (90 kg) Wet guncotton or TNT
- Range and speed: 1,500 yd (1,400 m) at 40 kn (74 km/h), 4,000 yd (3,700 m) at 29 kn (54 km/h)
- Notes: Substantially improved depth-keeping mechanism and a much more reliable striker-fired contact fuze.

== Mark V ==
Used on the River-class and 1905 Tribal-class destroyers.

- Year : about 1899
- Weight : 1,353 lb (614 kg)
- Warhead : 296 lb (134 kg) including pistol
- Propulsion : Compressed air

== Mark VI ==
Used on destroyers of the early 1900s.

- Year : about 1904
- Performance : 28.5 knots (52.8 km/h; 32.8 mph) for 4,000 yd (3,700 m) or 41 knots (76 km/h; 47 mph) for 1,000 yd (910 m)
- Propulsion : Compressed air

== Mark VII and VII* ==
Introduced on the 1908 members of the Tribal class (1905) destroyers. Used by torpedo boats built before the First World War and destroyers. Used by RAF flying boats in the 1920s.

- Year : 1907
- Warhead : 320 lb (150 kg) TNT
- Performance :
  - Mark VII :
    30 knots (56 km/h; 35 mph) for 6,000–7,000 yd (5,500–6,400 m)
    41 knots (76 km/h; 47 mph) for 3,000 yd (2,700 m)
  - Mark VII* :
    29 knots (54 km/h; 33 mph) for 7,000 yd (6,400 m)
    35 knots (65 km/h; 40 mph) for 5,000 yd (4,600 m)
- Propulsion : Wet-heater

== Mark VIII ==
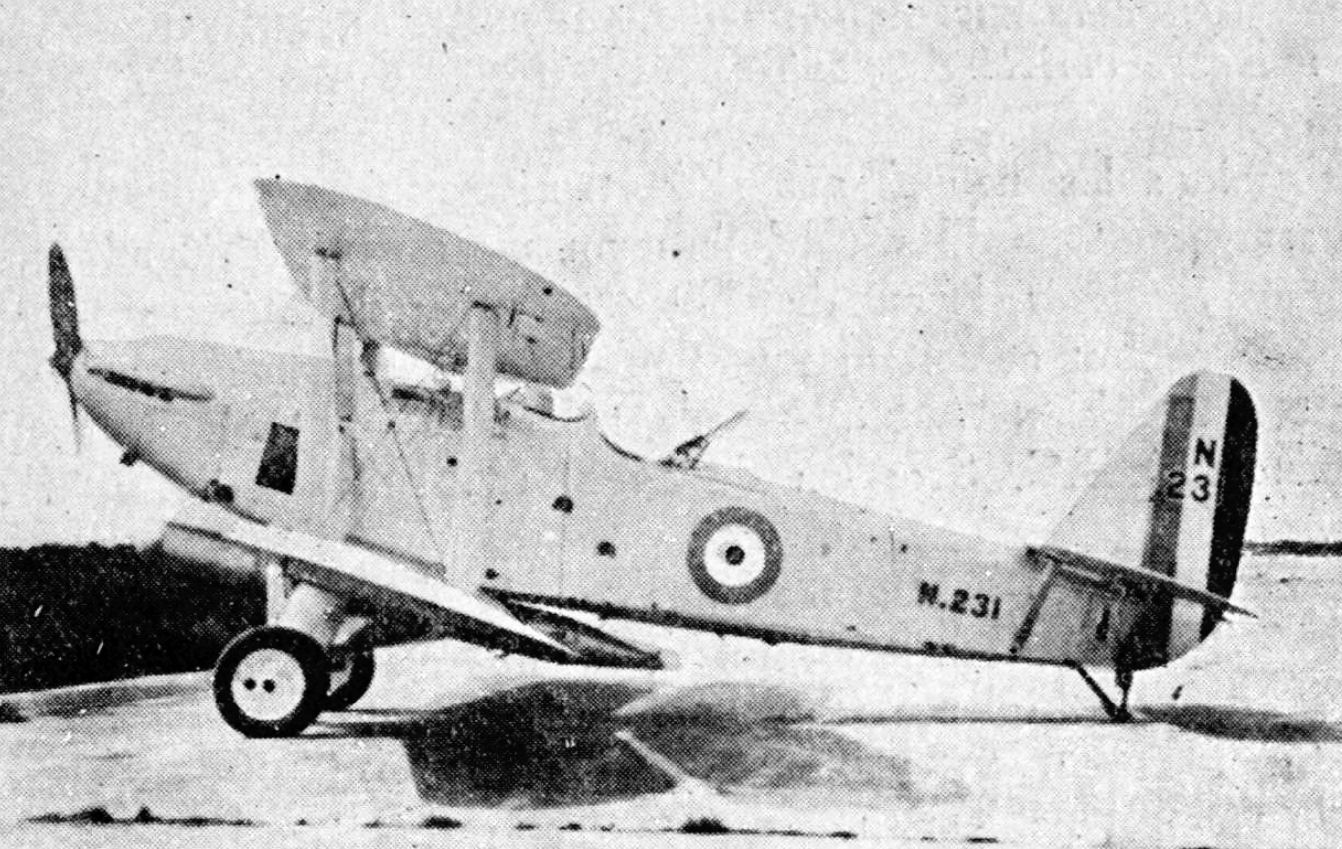
A Blackburn Ripon fitted with a Mark VIII aerial torpedo, in 1929.

Designed 1912, in service 1913. Originally developed as submarine armament. Prior to 1912, Royal Navy submarines exclusively used cold (compressed air) torpedoes, due to safety, reliability, and logistics considerations - as heated torpedoes required special launch tube hardware which facilitated ignition of the heater. It was also thought that long range was unnecessary for submarines. By 1911 these problems had been obviated, and the first heated torpedo to be launched from a Royal Navy submarine had been an 18-inch RGF Mark VII*. The Mark VIII was a successor, the first heated torpedo to be designed from the ground up to be used by British submarines. In 1917, a new variant of the Mark VIII was designated for use as an aerial torpedo; ultimately the weapon would be used in this role until the mid-1930s. During the Second World War, a total of two Mark VIII torpedoes were launched at enemy targets, both by MTBs.

Specifications:

RGF Mark VIII

- Entered service: 1913
- Propulsion: Wet heater
- Weight: 1,422 lb (645 kg)
- Length: 16 ft 8 in (5.08 m)
- Explosive charge: 320 lb (150 kg) TNT
- Range and speed: 1,500 yd (1,400 m) at 41 kn (76 km/h), 3,500 yd (3,200 m) at 29 kn (54 km/h)

RGF Mark VIII*

- Entered service: 1914
- Propulsion: Wet heater
- Weight: 1,425 lb (646 kg)
- Length: 16 ft 8 in (5.08 m)
- Explosive charge: 320 lb (150 kg) TNT
- Range and speed: 1,500 yd (1,400 m) at 41 kn (76 km/h), 2,000 yd (1,800 m) at 39 kn (72 km/h), 3,500 yd (3,200 m) at 29 kn (54 km/h) 4,000 yd (3,700 m) at 28 kn (52 km/h)

== Mark XI ==
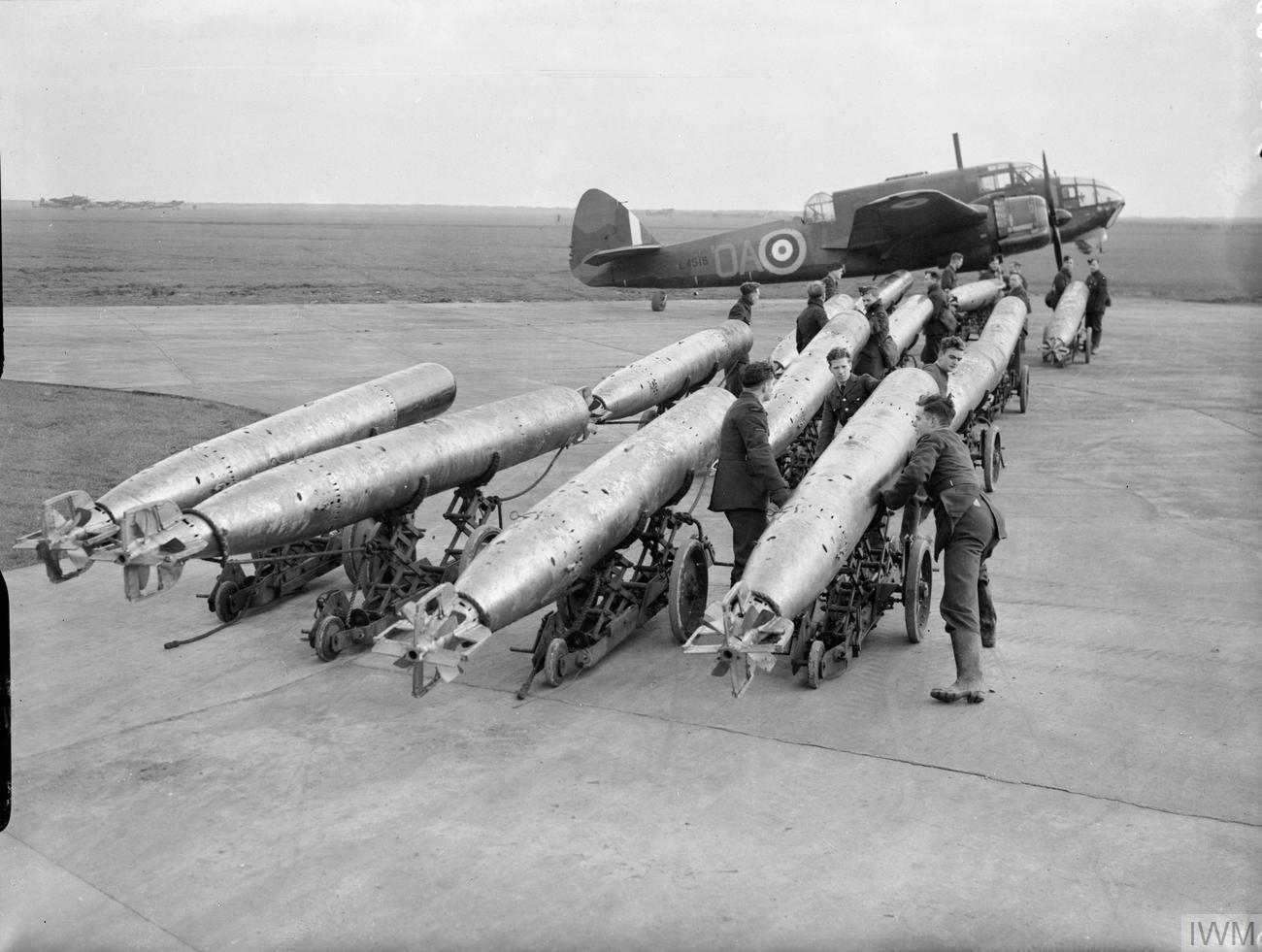
Mark XI torpedoes being hauled and prepared for loading, with a Bristol Beaufort in the background.

Designed in 1934 and entered service in 1936. An aerial torpedo which served briefly. The design specifications called for an airdrop speed of 150 knots at an altitude of 30–100 ft (9.1–30.5 m), not to dive below 60 ft (18 m) after splashdown, and recover to its set depth within 400 yd (370 m). In service, the weapon suffered from poor durability due to the long flotation chamber. This prompted its replacement with the Mark XII. Remaining units were modified for surface vessel use and assigned to torpedo boats. During the Second World War, a mere 22 units of the Mark XI were expended.

Specifications:

Mark XI

- Entered service: 1936
- Propulsion: Burner cycle
- Weight: 1,500 lb (680 kg) (approximate)
- Length: 16 ft (4.9 m) (approximate)
- Explosive charge: 465 lb (211 kg) TNT
- Range and speed: 1,500 yd (1,400 m) at 40 kn (74 km/h), 4,000 yd (3,700 m) at 24–25 kn (44–46 km/h)
- Max airdrop speed: 150 kn (280 km/h)
- Notes: Almost entirely used for training purposes only. Superseded by the Mark XII after 1937.

Mark XI Modified

- Entered service: 1940
- Propulsion: Burner cycle
- Weight: 1,500 lb (680 kg) (approximate)
- Length: 16 ft (4.9 m) (approximate)
- Explosive charge: 440 lb (200 kg) TNT
- Range and speed: 1,500 yd (1,400 m) at 40 kn (74 km/h), 3,000 yd (2,700 m) at 27 kn (50 km/h)
- Notes: Repurposed aerial torpedoes with modest modifications. Used by torpedo boats.

== Mark XII ==
18-inch Mark XII
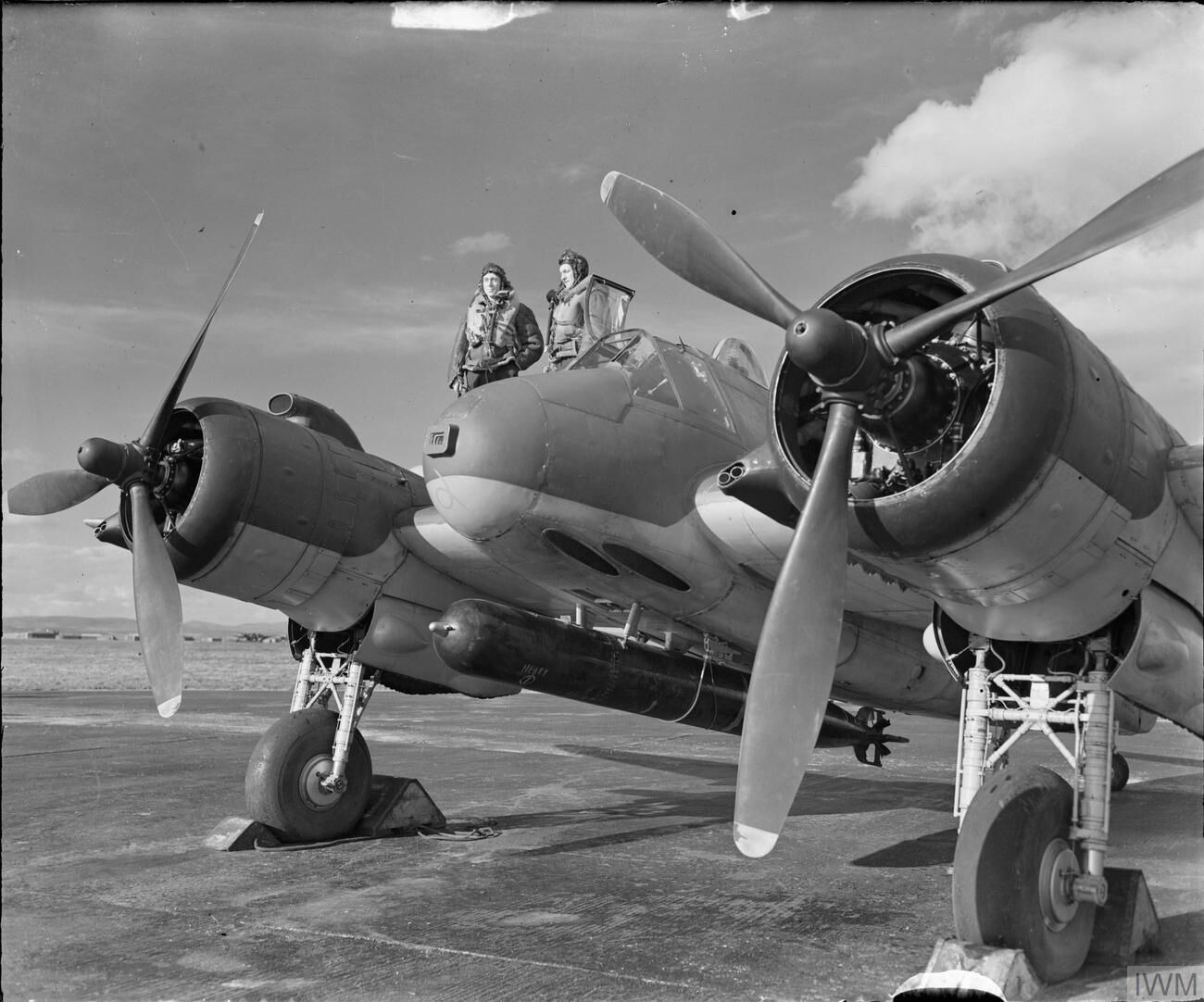
- A Mark XII torpedo fitted to a Bristol Beaufighter
- Type: Torpedo
- Place of origin: United Kingdom

Service history
- In service: 1937-1945

Production history
- Designed: 1935

Specifications
- Mass: 1,548 lb (702 kg)
- Length: 16 ft 3 in (4.95 m)
- Diameter: 17.72 in (450 mm)
- Warhead: TNT
- Warhead weight: 388 lb (176 kg)
- Engine: Burner cycle 140 hp (at 40 knots)
- Maximum speed: 40 knots (74 km/h; 46 mph) for 1,500 yd (1,400 m) or 37 knots (69 km/h; 43 mph) for 3,500 yd (3,200 m)

Aircraft launched, used by Fleet Air Arm and RAF Coastal Command.

== Mark XIV ==
18-inch Mark XIV
- Type: Torpedo
- Place of origin: United Kingdom

Production history
- Designed: around 1938

Specifications
- Mass: 1,630 lb (740 kg)
- Diameter: 17.72 in (450 mm)
- Warhead: TNT
- Warhead weight: 375 lb (170 kg)
- Engine: Whitehead wet heater (methyl fuel)
- Maximum speed: 45 knots (83 km/h; 52 mph) for 1,650 yd (1,510 m) or 41 knots (76 km/h; 47 mph) for 2,950 yd (2,700 m)

The Mark XIV was an aircraft-launched torpedo. Stocks were lost with the fall of Singapore.

== Project Toraplane ==
A 1939 project to create a gliding aerial torpedo, running in tandem with the "Doravane" project to create a similarly-delivered glide bomb. The entire scheme was called "Toraplane", with the payload commonly referred to as "Tora". Developed by Sir Dennistoun Burney and Nevil Shute. Tested with the use of Mark XII and Mark XIV torpedoes. Intended to be delivered by the Fairey Albacore, Bristol Beaufort, Blackburn Botha and Fairey Swordfish. The operational principle was to release the weapon from an altitude of 2,500 ft (760 m), whereupon it would enter a passive glide phase at a descending angle for approximately 5,000 yd (4,600 m). This would allow aircraft to launch from a relatively safe stand-off range, away from enemy short-range air defences. Toraplane was never used in action, with the project being cancelled in 1942. The project was deemed a failure due to the relatively low speed of the glider, which enemy warships could plausibly dodge or shoot down.

Specifications:

Tora Mark I

- Prototype date: 1939
- Propulsion: Wet heater
- Weight: Approximately 1,880 lb (850 kg)
- Wingspan: 11 ft 4 in (3.45 m)
- Length: Approximately 17 ft (5.2 m)
- Explosive charge: 375 lb (170 kg) TNT
- Range and speed: 1,500 m (0.81 nmi) at 45 kn (83 km/h) after splashdown
- Max airdrop speed: Approximately 120 kn (220 km/h)
- Note: Using Mark XIV torpedo as payload. Tests were unsatisfactory, prompting the design of a Tora Mark II.

Tora Mark II

- Prototype date: 1940
- Propulsion: Wet heater
- Weight: 1,790–1,840 lb (810–830 kg)
- Wingspan: 14–15 ft (4.3–4.6 m)
- Length: Approximately 17 ft (5.2 m)
- Explosive charge: 388 lb (176 kg) TNT
- Range and speed: 1,800 m (0.97 nmi) at 40 kn (74 km/h) after splashdown
- Max airdrop speed: Approximately 150 kn (280 km/h)
- Note: Using Mark XII torpedo as payload, due to wartime allocation priorities. Never used operationally.

== Mark XV ==
18-inch Mark XV
- Type: Torpedo
- Place of origin: United Kingdom

Production history
- Designed: around 1942

Specifications
- Mass: 1,801 lb (817 kg)
- Diameter: 17.69 in (449 mm)
- Warhead: TNT
- Warhead weight: 545 lb (247 kg)
- Engine: Whitehead wet heater (methyl fuel)
- Maximum speed: 40 knots (74 km/h; 46 mph) for 2,500 yd (2,300 m) or 33 knots (61 km/h; 38 mph) for 3,200 yd (2,900 m)

- Year: 1942
- Operators: Fleet Air Arm, RAF Coastal Command, Royal Navy
- Role: Aircraft and Motor Torpedo Boats, 1943 onwards
- Dimensions: 17.69 in (449 mm) × 17 ft 2.7 in (5.250 m)
- Warhead: 545 lb (247 kg) Torpex
- Propulsion: Burner cycle
- Performance: 40 knots (74 km/h; 46 mph) for 2,500 yd (2,300 m) or 33 knots (61 km/h; 38 mph) for 3,200 yd (2,900 m)

== Mark XVI ==
A proposed aerial torpedo for ASW. Dropped with a parachute over the approximate location of a submerged submarine, after splashdown it would move in a circling pattern in order to randomly hit the target. Propulsion was electric, with a speed of approximately 10 kn (19 km/h) and an endurance of 30 minutes. The project was abandoned in 1943. The basic concept of the weapon may have resembled that of the Japanese QR Project spiraling torpedo.

== Mark XVII ==
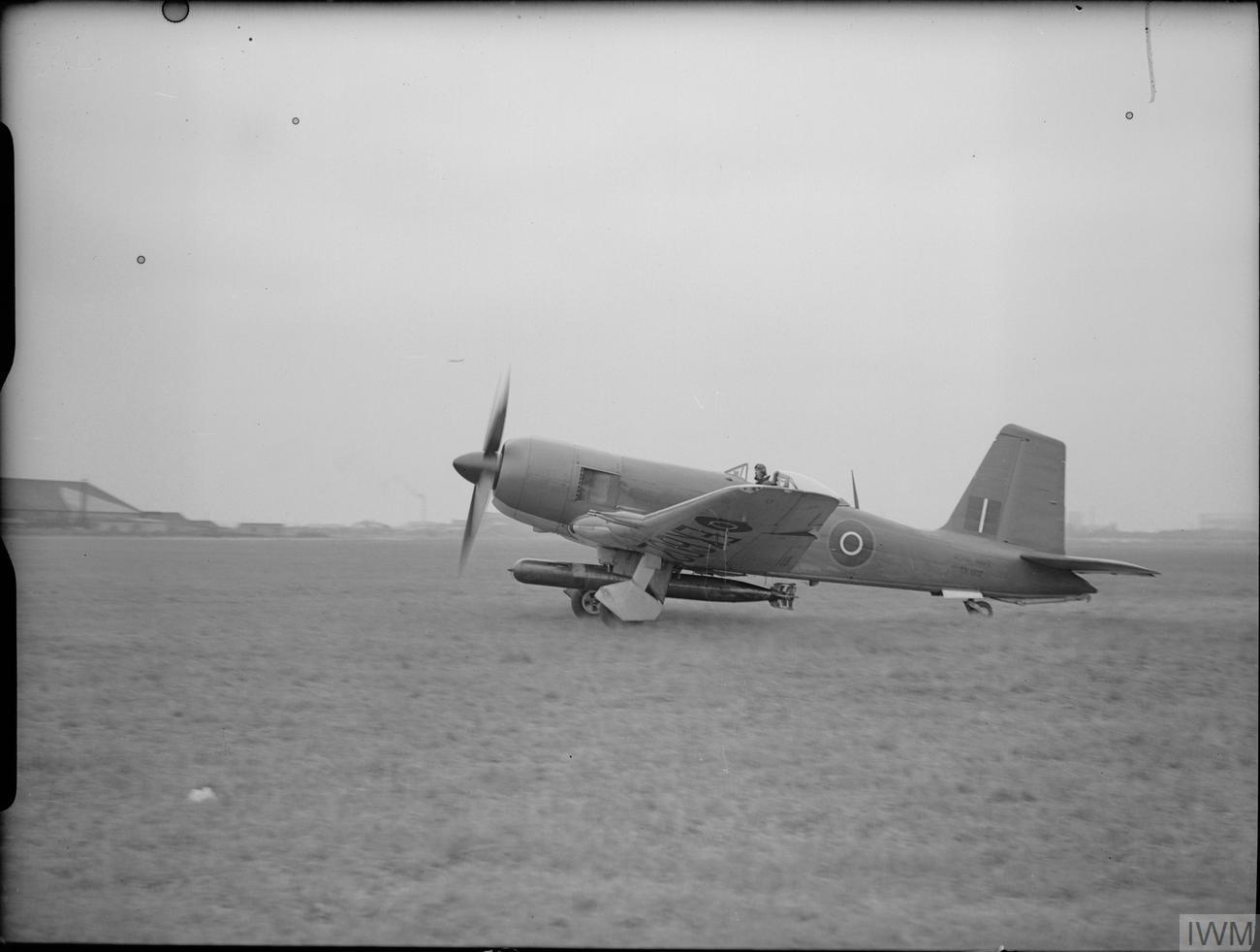
A Blackburn Firebrand carrying a Mark XVII torpedo.

Designed 1944, in service 1945. A reinforced development of the 18-inch Mark XV aerial torpedo, capable of greater airdrop speeds.

Specifications:

Mark XVII

- Entered service: 1945
- Propulsion: Burner cycle
- Weight: 1,875 lb (850 kg) (with heavy warhead)
- Length: 17 ft 4 in (5.28 m)
- Explosive charge: 600 lb (270 kg) or 432.5 lb (196.2 kg) Torpex
- Range and speed: 2,500 yd (2,300 m) at 39–40 kn (72–74 km/h)
- Max airdrop speed: 350 kn (650 km/h)
- Notes: The heavy warhead was used by the Blackburn Firebrand and land-based aircraft like the Avro Lancaster. Smaller aircraft used the light warhead.

== Project Bowler ==
Project initiated 1942. The first practical attempt by the British to develop a torpedo with electroacoustic guidance. Almost all the research work was done by the Royal Air Force stations at RAF Halton and RAF Titchfield. The Bowler was a standard aerial torpedo (the 18-inch Mark XVII was used for the prototype) equipped with a simplistic acoustic guidance system and a sonic ping emitter. It did not possess homing capability. The functional principle was to drop the torpedo in parallel with the movement track of an enemy warship, so that the weapon passes within 100 yd (91 m) of the target. The weapon possessed two horizontally-oriented directional hydrophones on either side of the torpedo body, facing perpendicularly from the torpedo's principal axis; upon passing alongside the target, the hydrophone facing it would receive the ping return from the sonic emitter. This would trigger the guidance system to execute a right-angle turn towards the direction of the ping return, hitting the target broadside. The advantage of dropping an aerial torpedo in parallel with an enemy warship was in not having to approach it broadside, i.e. within the firing arc of most of the warship's SHORAD. The weapon had multiple flaws; if dropped from the aft of a moving target, the guidance system could be triggered prematurely by the target's wake. It would also trigger from loud noises in its proximity, such as the explosion of another Bowler if dropped in salvos; the weapons would also be successfully thwarted by the target warship if it dropped shallow patterns of depth charges. The project never saw use against live targets and was abruptly terminated in 1944, after prototype testing.

Specifications:

Mark XVII Bowler

- Prototype date: 1944
- Propulsion: Burner cycle
- Weight: 1,885 lb (855 kg) (approximate)
- Length: 17 ft 4 in (5.28 m)
- Explosive charge: 600 lb (270 kg) Torpex
- Range and speed: 2,500 yd (2,300 m) at 39–40 kn (72–74 km/h)
- Max airdrop speed: 350 kn (650 km/h)
- Notes: Never used operationally.

== Project Joker ==
Project initiated 1942. Before Britain's entry into the Second World War, acoustic guidance was explored tentatively and it was demonstrated that passive acoustic guidance was feasible with weapon speeds below approximately 20 kn (37 km/h); there was no requirement for such a weapon from the Royal Navy, and the research data were sent to the United States. The first British project to develop a truly homing torpedo with electroacoustic guidance emerged as a consolidation of pre-1939 research work and the Bowler project, which entered active development earlier the same year. Research work was carried out at RAF Shinfield Park, at the time designated as RAF Technical Training Command. The project was supervised by Sir John Tremayne Babington. The Joker was a modification of the 18-inch Mark XV torpedo, intended to be used to interdict submerged submarines. A phase differential circuit, receiving signals from hydrophones mounted in the nose of the weapon, would convey data to a discriminator circuit, which would in turn adjust the weapon's gyrocompass for bearing and depth. The seeker head did not drive the control surfaces of the weapon directly. Tests of the prototype ran into considerable problems: the weapon experienced self-noise and reverberation, as well as water entry shock, all of which deafened the hydrophones. In 1943, Joker was re-evaluated and split into two new projects: Trumper, which would be a similarly unsuccessful acoustic homing modification of the 21-inch Mark VIII and 21-inch Mark IX, and Dealer, which would eventually become the successful Mark 30.

Specifications:

Mark XV Joker

- Prototype date: 1943
- Propulsion: Burner cycle
- Weight: 1,850 lb (840 kg) (approximate)
- Length: 17 ft 3 in (5.26 m)
- Explosive charge: 545 lb (247 kg) Torpex
- Range and speed: 6,000 yd (5,500 m) at 20 kn (37 km/h) (approximate)
- Max airdrop speed: below 270 kn (500 km/h) (likely much lower)
- Notes: Unsuccessful due to noise overwhelming the seeker head and sensitivity to entry shock.

== Mark 30 Dealer ==
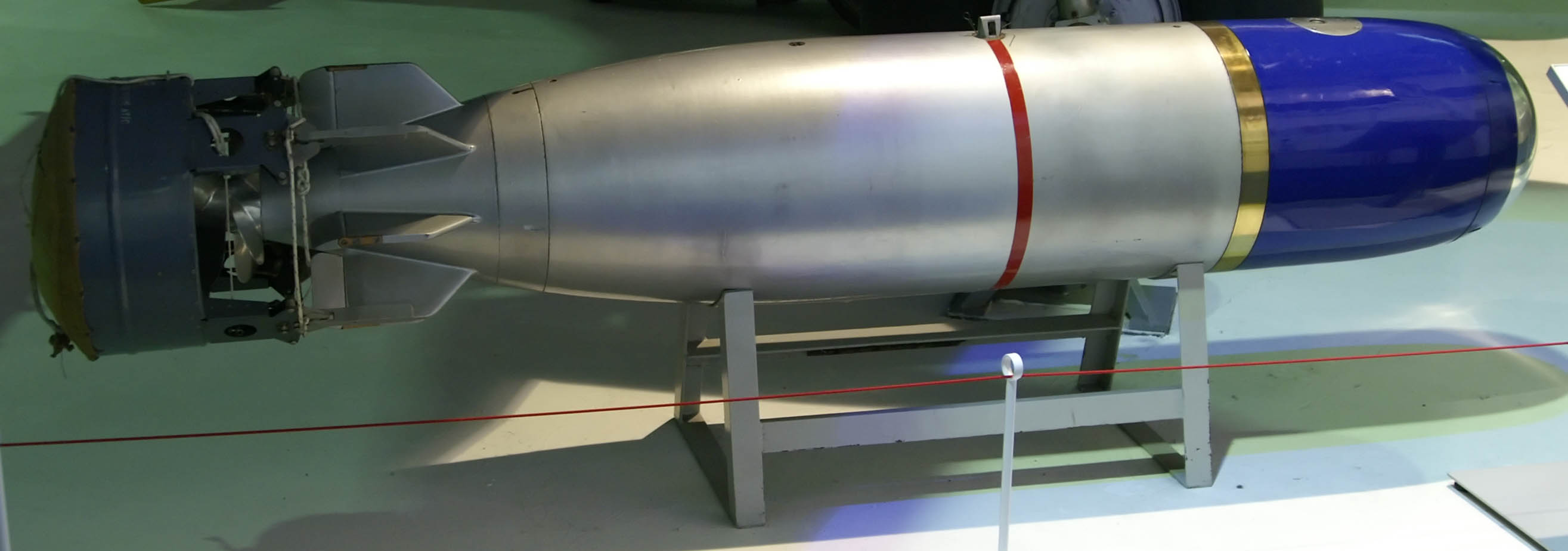
A Mark 30 torpedo at the RAF Museum in Hendon, London.

An air-dropped passive acoustic homing torpedo known as "Dealer". The program was initiated in 1943, with the goal of developing a parachute-dropped ASW weapon. At the end of the Second World War the "Dealer" project was renamed "Dealer A" and became further branched out into the 21-inch "Bidder" and 18-inch "Dealer B" projects. Thus, the Mark 30 Dealer was developed alongside the Mark 20 Bidder and shared elements of its design. The original design for the Dealer torpedo (Dealer A) had no control surfaces, being steered by two propellers that varied in speed, in a manner similar to the Italian-supplied LT 350 used by Germany. Pitch control was achieved by moving the battery fore and aft. Dealer A did not see service use, but its successor, Dealer B (Mark 30 Mod 0), a conventional design of a passive acoustic homing finned torpedo using contra-rotating propellers, achieved a high hit rate against submerged targets during trials in 1953 and was issued starting in June 1954. Since Dealer A never entered service, Dealer B was simply called "Dealer". Approximately 1200 units were built in total, with the weapon serving in both the RN and RAF until 1970. The Mark 30 Mod 1, a successor design, had several improvements but this program was cancelled in 1955 in favour of purchasing Mark 43 Mod 3 torpedoes from the United States. The reason for this decision was the impending retirement of the Avro Shackleton and Fairey Gannet aircraft, with no adequate replacement; the upcoming Westland Wasp ASW helicopter was incapable of carrying the Mark 30. Although the decision to retire the aircraft were stalled, the Mark 30 Mod 1 would not see development. Trials with the Mark 44 in 1956 indicated that the hit rate was approximately four times worse than the Mark 30 Dealer in its original form, but nonetheless, the British government went ahead with their decision, placing a contract with the Plessey Company for standardising the American torpedoes for British use. The Mark 43 was intended to serve as a stopgap until the arrival of the Mark 44, but this did not occur until 1966. In 1957, preliminary work was being done on a 14-inch, 25-knot active/passive homing aerial torpedo for helicopter delivery, using the motor of the Mark 30. This, much like the Mark 30 Mod 1, was passed up in favour of American torpedoes and the Mark 21 Pentane, which in turn would be cancelled shortly thereafter. Additionally, beginning in the mid-1960s, there was a project for a Mark 31 aerial torpedo successor to the Mark 30, designed to surpass the Mark 44. This project would be cancelled in 1971 in favour of purchasing the Mark 46.

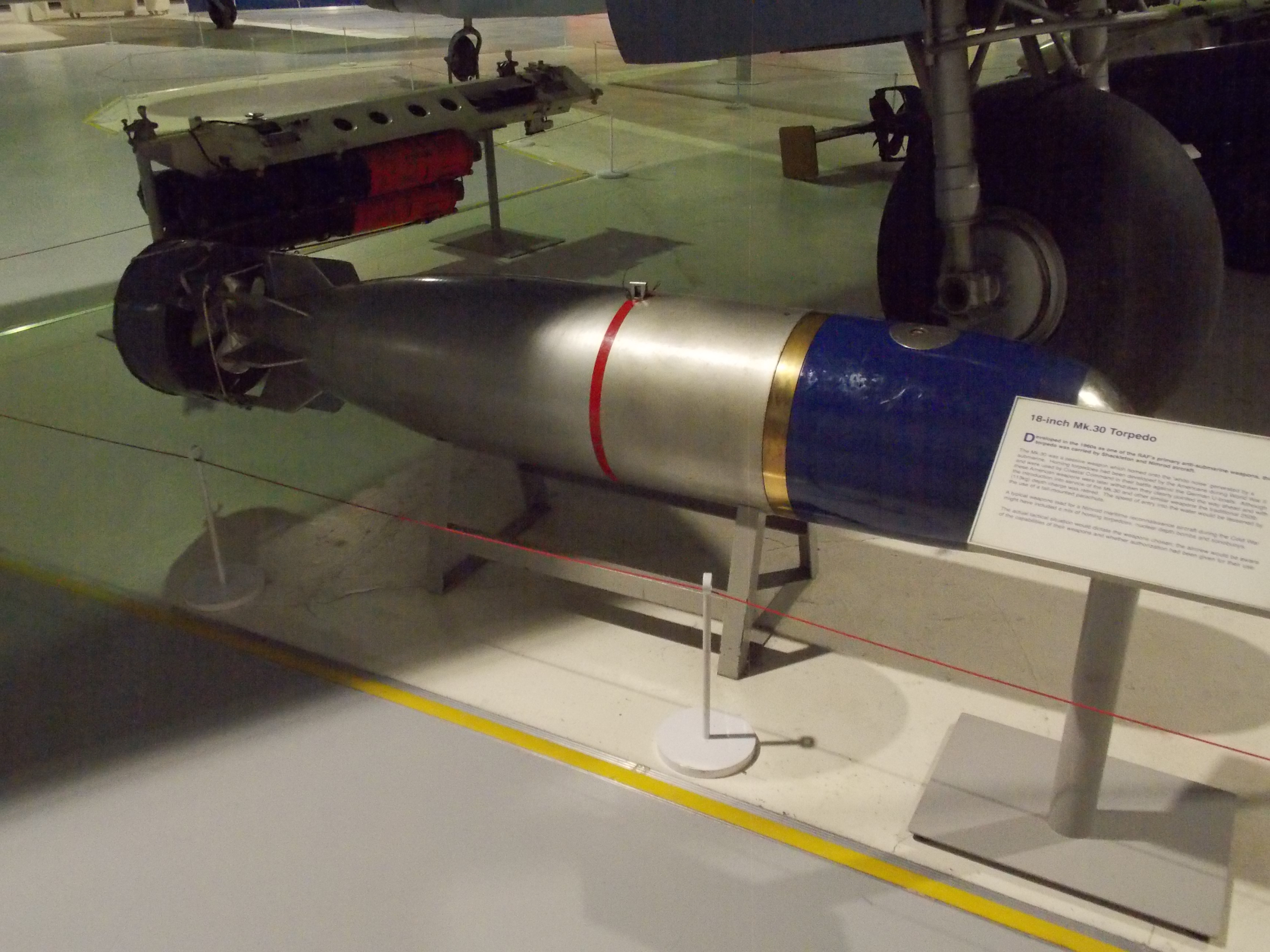
A Mark 30 exhibit in Hangar 4 of the RAF Museum.

Specifications:

Mark 30 Mod 0

- Entered service: 1954
- Weight: 646 lb (293 kg)
- Length: 8 ft 0.5 in (2.451 m)
- Explosive charge: 90 lb (41 kg) Torpex
- Range and speed: 9,000 yd (8,200 m) at 12.5 kn (23.2 km/h), 2,500 yd (2,300 m) at 19 kn (35 km/h)

== Project Camrose ==
Project for a rocket-propelled torpedo with the function of an anti-torpedo countermeasure, initiated in 1951. A proposal for "Camrose" was drawn up soon after the end of the Second World War, but research only commenced in 1951 after a study was published detailing the feasibility of anti-torpedo torpedoes. The concept envisioned a rocket-like weapon launched in salvos from the decks of surface vessels, which would dive into water and proceed for some distance at a speed of 50 knots. An acoustic influence fuze would listen for hostile torpedoes in its vicinity, and detonate its warhead when a weapon were detected within 45 feet (14 m). The resulting explosion would either destroy, damage, or sufficiently incapacitate the incoming weapon. The "Camrose" would have an effective range of approximately 1,200 yards (1,100 m). Rocket propulsion using solid fuel motors was selected due to its low cost compared to piston engines, as well as the instant no-maintenance readiness of the weapon, and the viability of propulsion while airborne. The initial concept considered 15-inch or 16-inch diameter bodies due to the practical problems of using larger bodies and being able to launch them in sufficient numbers; ultimately, the 18-inch Mark 15 torpedo was chosen for conversion to rocket propulsion instead. In 1952, the project's priority was greatly downgraded, which delayed prototype development. In 1954, the acoustic influence fuze was deemed to be sufficiently workable. Between 1953 and 1955, "Camrose" was developed in cooperation with the "Bootleg" rocket-propelled torpedo, using the test vehicles of the other project. In 1955, the "Camrose" project was cancelled due to an assessment that warships would not be capable of carrying sufficient units of the countermeasure to defend themselves against hostile torpedoes. A fundamentally similar concept is the ASW rocket, such as the RBU.

== Project Bootleg ==
Project for an aerial rocket-propelled ASuW non-homing torpedo, initiated in 1950. Developed by Vickers-Armstrong. Trials of prototype units began in 1952. The development of "Bootleg" was motivated by the introduction of Sverdlov class cruisers, which featured new sophisticated anti-air artillery. The weapon would approach the vicinity of the target while airborne, then enter the water and proceed towards the target as a high-speed torpedo, with a projected underwater speed of 65 knots. Upon integration with the "Camrose" project, functional prototypes - Dynamic Test Vehicles (DTV) and Experimental Rocket Vehicles (ERV) - were tested. The initial concept used an 18-inch body, but the actual prototype weapon would increase the body diameter to 20 inches. Both "Bootleg" and "Camrose" had a similar appearance of a conventional torpedo with a ducted nozzle which did not have propellers, instead having a solid rocket motor with a high aspect ratio. The method of employment for the "Bootleg" would have involved a high-speed strike aircraft such as the Westland Wyvern or Blackburn Buccaneer tossing the weapon at an enemy warship from approximately 5,000 yards (4,600 m) or more, with the torpedo's motor igniting immediately in flight. After traversing most of the distance while airborne, the torpedo would dive at high speed and reach the target underwater.

A test of the "Bootleg" ERV in 1954 demonstrated another potential of the weapon. The ERV was launched underwater, from a depth of 15 feet, at the Arrochar torpedo range in Loch Long, Scotland. It accelerated to 60 knots within two seconds, dived to a depth of 50 feet, then shot to the surface, emerging approximately 150 yards from the firing point after six seconds. Climbing at an angle of some 30 degrees to the horizontal, the ERV attained a maximum altitude of 200 feet, and - after 14 seconds of flight - dived again 900 yards from the point at which it first emerged from the surface. This demonstrated a potential use as a high-speed submarine-launched ASuW torpedo with an airborne component, compatible with 21-inch launch tubes, capable of far higher speeds than any existing conventional torpedo; the airborne segment had an effective speed of over 114 knots.

The "Bootleg" project was defunded and cancelled alongside "Camrose" in 1955. The Red Angel anti-ship rocket was favoured instead, due to its lower cost and greater simplicity. The basic fire control problem for "Bootleg" was deemed more complex.

Specifications:

Bootleg ERV

- Prototype date: 1953
- Weight: 1,730 lb (780 kg)
- Diameter: 20 inches (51 cm)
- Length: 12 ft 6 in (3.81 m)
- Explosive charge: 575 lb (261 kg) Torpex
- Range and speed: Approximately 5,000 yd (4,600 m) at 300–500 kn (560–930 km/h) while airborne, approximately 1,000 yd (910 m) at 70 kn (130 km/h) while underwater

== See also ==
- British 21-inch torpedo
- List of torpedoes
