= Admiralty Surface Weapons Establishment =

Historical research department of the British Navy

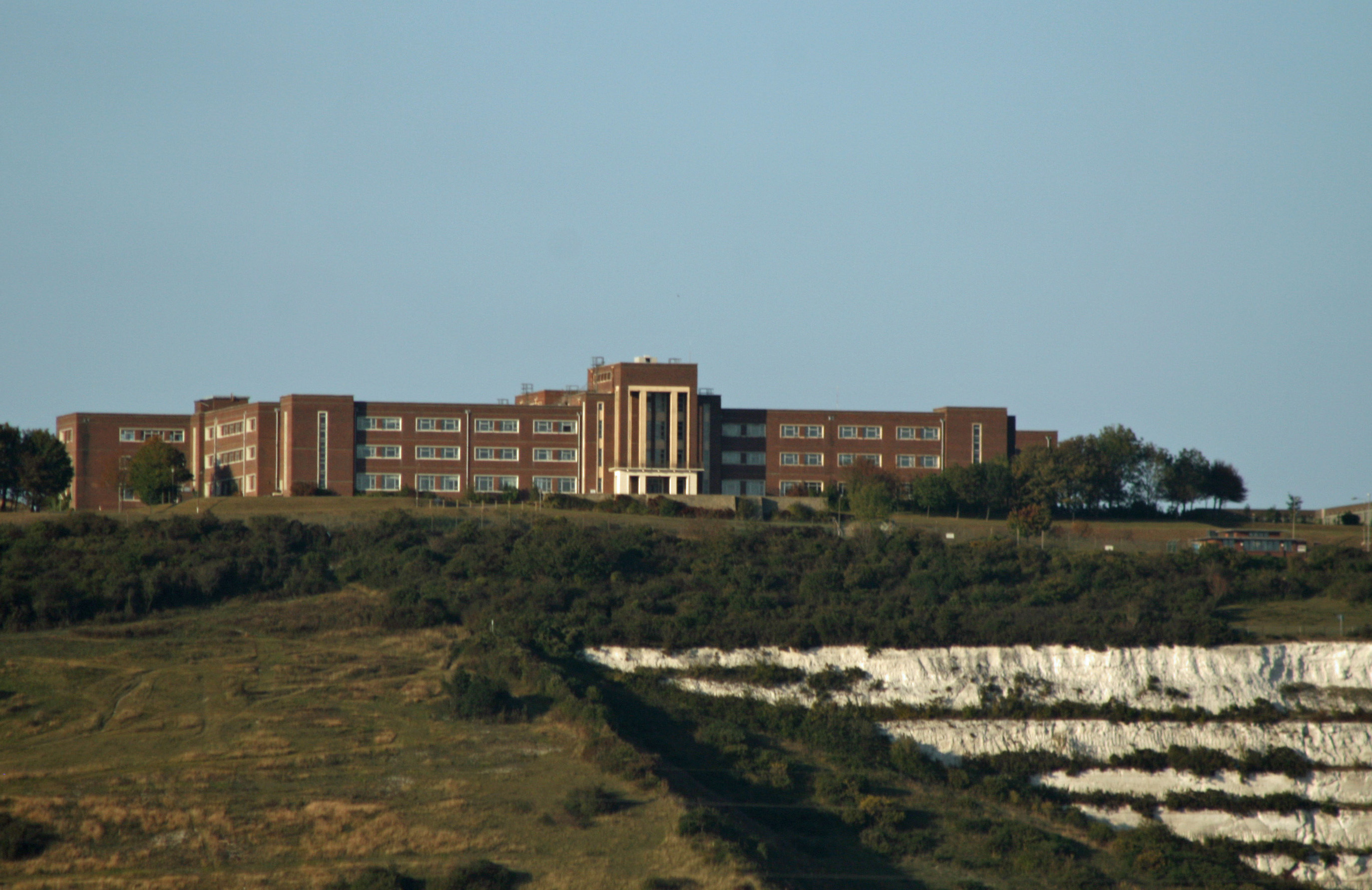
- ASWE Building on Portsdown Hill

Department overview
- Formed: 1959
- Preceding Department: Admiralty Signal and Radar Establishment Admiralty Gunnery Establishment
- Dissolved: 1984
- Superseding Department: Admiralty Research Establishment (ARE)
- Jurisdiction: Government of the United Kingdom
- Headquarters: Fort Southwick Portsdown Hill, England
- Parent Department: Admiralty; Ministry of Defence, Navy Department

The Admiralty Surface Weapons Establishment (ASWE) and later known as the Admiralty Research Establishment (ARE) was a department of the British Admiralty and later Navy Department (Ministry of Defence) responsible for research and development, into the design and testing of devices, equipment, and techniques in-regard to naval communications, electronic counter-measures, radar missile control and other related fields it was based at Portsdown Hill, Hampshire, England from 1959 to 1984.

== History ==
In 1959 the Admiralty Gunnery Establishment (AGE) and Admiralty Signals and Radar Establishment (ASRE) were merged to form Admiralty Surface Weapons Establishment (ASWE), this was due to advances in missile technologies research. It was responsible for research and development in relation to naval communications, missile control systems by use of radar, and electronic counter-measures. In 1971 as the ASWE was expanding its work it assumed responsibility for navigational compass development, this resulted in the Admiralty Compass Observatory becoming its Navigation Division within this department. In 1984 as part of a further centralisation of R & D work being undertaken by the Ministry of Defence, it was merged with two other departments the Admiralty Underwater Weapons Establishment (AUWE) and Admiralty Marine Technology Establishment (AMTE) to form the Admiralty Research Establishment (ARE).

The AWSE building on Portsdown Hill was demolished 2010-2011.

=== Timeline ===
- Admiralty Experimental Department (1917-1941)
- Admiralty Signal Establishment (1941-1948)
- Admiralty Signal and Radar Establishment, Portsmouth (1948-1959) and Admiralty Gunnery Establishment (1931-1959)
- Admiralty Surface Weapons Establishment (ASWE), Portsdown, Portsmouth (1959-1984)
