= Admiralty Central Metallurgical Laboratory =

British Navy research unit

Department overview
- Formed: 1936
- Preceding Department: Engineering Department, Portsmouth Dockyard
- Dissolved: 1956
- Superseding Department: Chemical Department
- Jurisdiction: Government of the United Kingdom
- Headquarters: Emsworth, England
- Parent Department: Admiralty

The Admiralty Central Metallurgical Laboratory was a specialist research unit of the British Royal Navy from 1936 to 1956.

== History ==
The Central Metallurgical Laboratory was based at Emsworth in England. The organization was a specialist research unit as part of the Portsmouth Dockyard's engineering department. In 1956 the unit was closed and its staff and work was divided between two other Admiralty organizations the Materials Laboratory and Chemical Department.

== See also ==
- Admiralty

== Sources ==
- Archives, The National. "Admiralty: Central Metallurgical Laboratory: Reports and Papers". discovery.nationalarchives.gov.uk. National Archives UK, ADM 254, 1943-1956.
