= Basil Willett =

Basil Rupert Willett CBE, DSC (23 July 1896, Chislehurst - 9 Jun 1966) was Captain Superintendent of the Admiralty Signal Establishment from 1941 to 1943.

He received an officers naval education at Royal Naval College, Osborne and Britannia Royal Naval College Dartmouth and attained the rank of Lieutenant in 1917.
