= Chemical Department (Royal Navy) =

Admiralty department of Portsmouth, England

Department overview
- Formed: 1870
- Preceding Department: Office of the Admiralty Chemist
- Dissolved: 1977
- Superseding Department: Central Dockyard Laboratory
- Jurisdiction: Government of the United Kingdom
- Headquarters: Haslar, Portsmouth, England
- Parent Department: Admiralty, Navy Department

The Chemical Department and later known as the Central Dockyard Laboratory was the Admiralty department that was responsible for the testing and trials of lubricants, metals and paints for the Royal Navy. It was based at Portsmouth, England from 1870 to 1977.

== History ==
The Admiralty Chemical Department, Portsmouth, originated in the appointment of an Admiralty Chemist in 1867. In 1870 as the work of the ADMC was expanding led to the creation of a department with supporting researchers and clerical staff being established. In 1956 specific functions of the Central Metallurgical Laboratory transferred to the department when it was re-styled as the Central Dockyard Laboratory. In 1977 it merged with Admiralty Marine Technology Establishment but remained a sub-division of that organisation. It provided Support Services for fleet and shore establishments, including metallurgy, chemistry, biology, paint technology and reactor chemistry research.

== Admiralty chemists ==
Post holders included:

- Dr William John Hay, Esq., F.C.S. 1867–1874 ref name=":0" />
- Dr William Weston, Esq., F.C.S. 1874–1904
- Dr Arnold Philip, Esq., F.C.S. 1904–1926
- Dr Frank George Edmed Esq., FIC. 1926–1940

This is an incomplete list of office holders.

== Timeline ==
- Board of Admiralty, Office of the Admiralty Chemist, (1872–1870)
- Board of Admiralty, Chemical Department, (1870–1965)
- Board of Admiralty, Central Dockyard Laboratory, (1965–1977)
- Ministry of Defence, Admiralty Marine Technology Establishment (AMTE), (1977-1984)
- Ministry of Defence, Admiralty Research Establishment (ARE), (1984–1991)
- Ministry of Defence, Defence Research Agency, (1991–1995)

== See also ==
- Admiralty Central Metallurgical Laboratory
