= Admiralty Underwater Weapons Launching Establishment =

Establishment overview
- Formed: 1947
- Dissolved: 1959
- Superseding Establishment: Admiralty Underwater Weapons Establishment
- Type: Establishment

The Admiralty Underwater Weapons Launching Establishment was an Admiralty research department dedicated to torpedo and mine launching gear. It was formed at West Howe, Bournemouth in 1947 and later became part of the Admiralty Underwater Weapons Establishment in 1959.

== History ==
The Admiralty's production of and research and development into launching gear for torpedoes and mines was originally carried out within facilities at HMNB Portsmouth from 1914. During World War II, with the threat of German air raids, all research and production of launching gear was moved to new premises at West Howe in 1941. Although production was relocated again in 1947, the establishment at West Howe continued to undertake research and development work. That year it was given the name the Admiralty Underwater Weapons Launching Establishment. An outstation at Horsea Island was used to conduct trials.

The establishment was closed in 1959 with the formation of the Admiralty Underwater Weapons Establishment at the Isle of Portland. The new establishment was an amalgamation of a number of Admiralty research sites, including the Launching Establishment, the Underwater Countermeasures and Weapons Establishment at Havant and the Torpedo Experimental Establishment at Greenock.

Following its closure, the West Howe site was purchased by the United Kingdom Atomic Energy Authority as an additional facility in connection with the Winfrith Atomic Energy Establishment. The site was sold again to the General Post Office in 1967.
