= Peter Trier =

Peter Eugene Trier (12 September 1919, Darmstadt – 21 March 2005) was a German physicist, electrical engineer and businessman. He was director of Mullard Research Laboratories from 1953 to 1969. He won the Richard Glazebrook Medal and Prize in 1984.

== Early years ==
Peter was the son of Ernst Joseph Trier (1886–1938), a prominent Darmstadt furniture manufacturer and Nelly Marie Bender. In the face of Nazi oppression, his Jewish father had been planning to leave for England when in 1938 he had his furniture business confiscated and was himself arrested on alleged foreign exchange charges. He died later that year in prison. However Peter had come to England in the early 1930's and attended Mill Hill School before studying mathematics at Cambridge University as a member of Trinity Hall College. He graduated as a wrangler in 1941. He then took up a position under the newly formed Admiralty Signal Establishment.
