= Aubrey Diamond =

British lawyer and educator (1923–2006)

Aubrey Diamond (December 1923 – 6 July 2006) was a lawyer, educator and public servant. Much of his focus was on consumer law.

Diamond attended the Central Foundation Boys' School in London until he was fifteen years old. After working at the London County Council as a clerical officer and wartime service in the Royal Air Force in Canada, he gained a Bachelor of Laws degree (LLB) at the London School of Economics (LSE) in 1950 and a Master of Laws (LLM) in 1956, also at LSE. In this period he also qualified as a solicitor and became a senior lecturer at the Law Society's School of Law (now the University of Law) in 1955. His role in legal education continued at LSE for ten years as Reader in Law followed by Professor in Law at Queen Mary College in 1966.

In 1959, he became a partner at Lawford & Co.

Diamond was also involved in public service and quangos. He joined the Central London Valuation Court in 1956 (and served there for 17 years, until 1973); Consumer Council from 1963; President of the National Federation of Consumer Groups and Vice-President of the Institute of Trading Standards Administration. He served on the Latey Committee on the age of majority from 1965 to 1967 and joined the Law Commission in 1971.

Diamond became Director of London University's Institute of Advanced Legal Studies in 1976, succeeding Sir Norman Anderson. He was a member of the Council of the Law Society from 1976 to 1992 and became an honorary fellow of LSE in 1984.

After his retirement, Diamond was Professor of Law at the University of Notre Dame's London Law Centre from 1987 to 1999 and President of the British Insurance Law Association from 1988 to 1990. He also taught at Stanford, Virginia, Melbourne and Tulane. Diamond died on 6 July 2006.

== Personal life ==
Diamond's parents had originated in Lithuania, leaving there to escape pogroms. His father was a tailor and also served as a special constable. He married Dr Eva Bobsach in 1955; the couple had a son and a daughter.
