= Admiralty Materials Laboratory =

Defence research establishments of United Kingdom

Department overview
- Formed: 1947
- Dissolved: 1977
- Superseding Department: Admiralty Marine Technology Establishment
- Jurisdiction: Government of the United Kingdom
- Headquarters: Holton Heath, England
- Parent Department: Admiralty

The Admiralty Materials Laboratory, located at Holton Heath, was one of the United Kingdom's principal defence research and discovery establishments. In 1978 The Admiralty Materials Laboratory was combined with the Naval Construction Research Establishment to form the Admiralty Marine Technology Establishment.

The Admiralty Materials Laboratory opened in 1947 in part of the Royal Naval Cordite Factory at Holton Heath, Dorset. It was formed round a nucleus of staff from the factory control laboratory. Its work programme has consisted of research and some development on materials and chemical techniques for naval service in the fields of metallurgy, rubber and plastics, chemical technology, and general chemicals. For some years it had a marine biological section also. Headquarters direction was provided by the Director of Materials Research until that directorate was abolished. In 1977 the Establishment became part of the Admiralty Marine Technology Establishment, then the Admiralty Research Establishment, and in 1991 part of the Defence Research Agency.

== Sources ==
- Archives, The National. "Admiralty and Ministry of Defence: Admiralty Materials Laboratory: Reports". discovery.nationalarchives.gov.uk. National Archives UK, ADM 252, 1947–1979.
