= Whitefield's Tabernacle, Moorfields =

Coordinates: 51°31′26″N 0°5′15″W

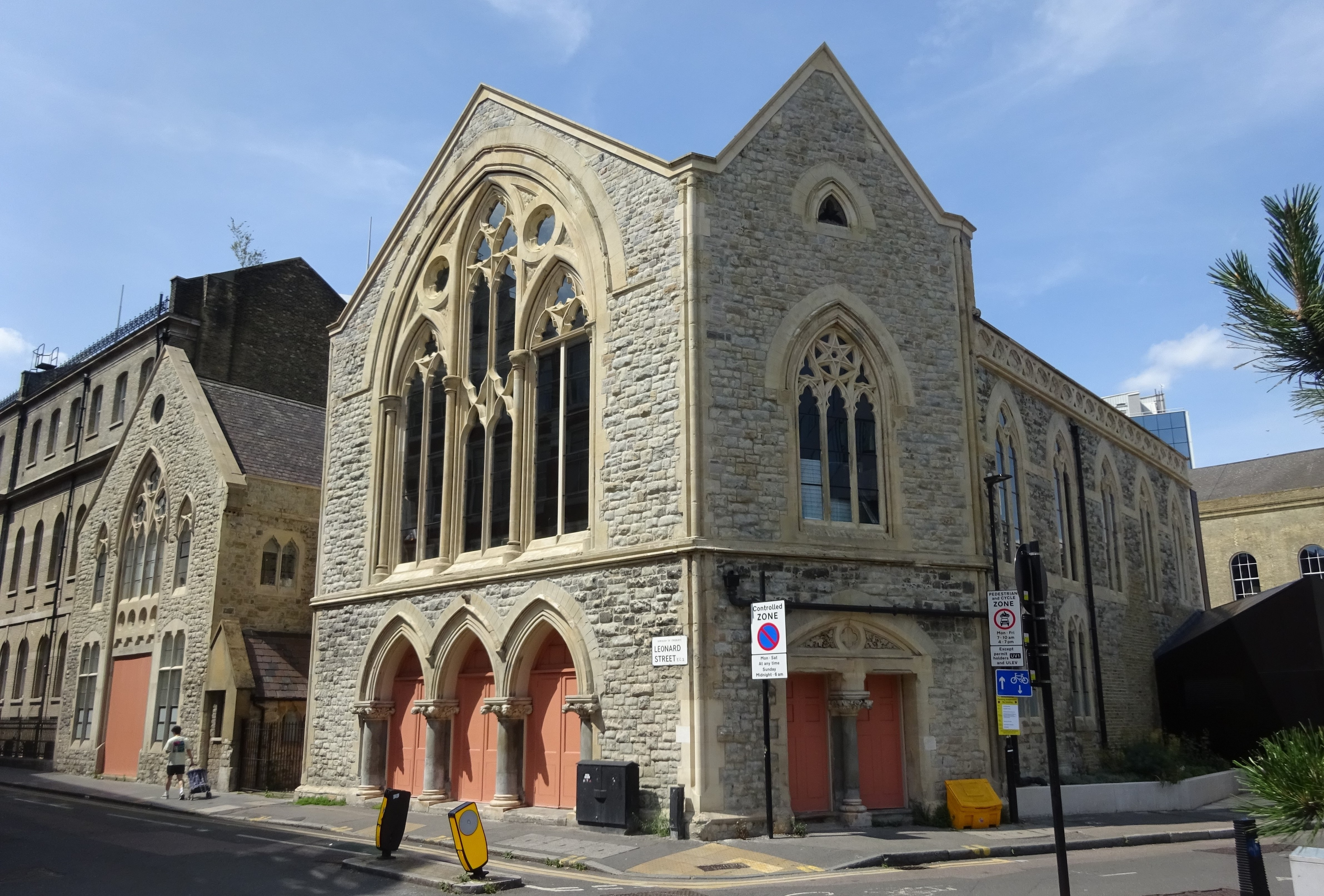
- Whitefield's Tabernacle (photographed 2025)
- Whitefield's Tabernacle, Moorfields
- Location: Tabernacle Street and Leonard Street, London
- Country: England
- Denomination: Church of England, Methodist, Congregationalist, United Reformed Church

History
- Dedicated: 1741

Whitefield's Tabernacle, Moorfields (also known as Moorfields Tabernacle) is a former church at the corner of Tabernacle Street and Leonard Street, Moorfields, London, England. The first church on the site was a wooden building erected by followers of the evangelical preacher George Whitefield in 1741. This was replaced by a brick building in 1753. Following Whitefield's death in 1770, John Wesley preached a sermon, "On the death of the Rev. Mr George Whitefield", both here and at Whitefield's Tabernacle, Tottenham Court Road.

In 1868, the church was rebuilt in stone to a robust Gothic design by C. G. Searle & Son. Immediately west of the church itself (in Leonard Street) a Sunday School was built. The foundation stone of the 1868 building reads: "Near this spot stood the Tabernacle built by the Rev. George Whitefield in 1753: 115 years afterward it was taken down and in its place this building was erected."

In 1907 a successor church opened near Alexandra Park, north London: this was known initially as Whitefield Tabernacle, but from 1922 as Alexandra Park Congregational Church. Many members of the Moorfields congregation transferred their allegiance, and numerous benefactions were also transferred. The Moorfields Tabernacle building was taken over by the nearby Central Foundation Boys' Grammar School. The Alexandra Park church was converted into flats in 2004.
