= Central Foundation Boys' School =

Cfbs

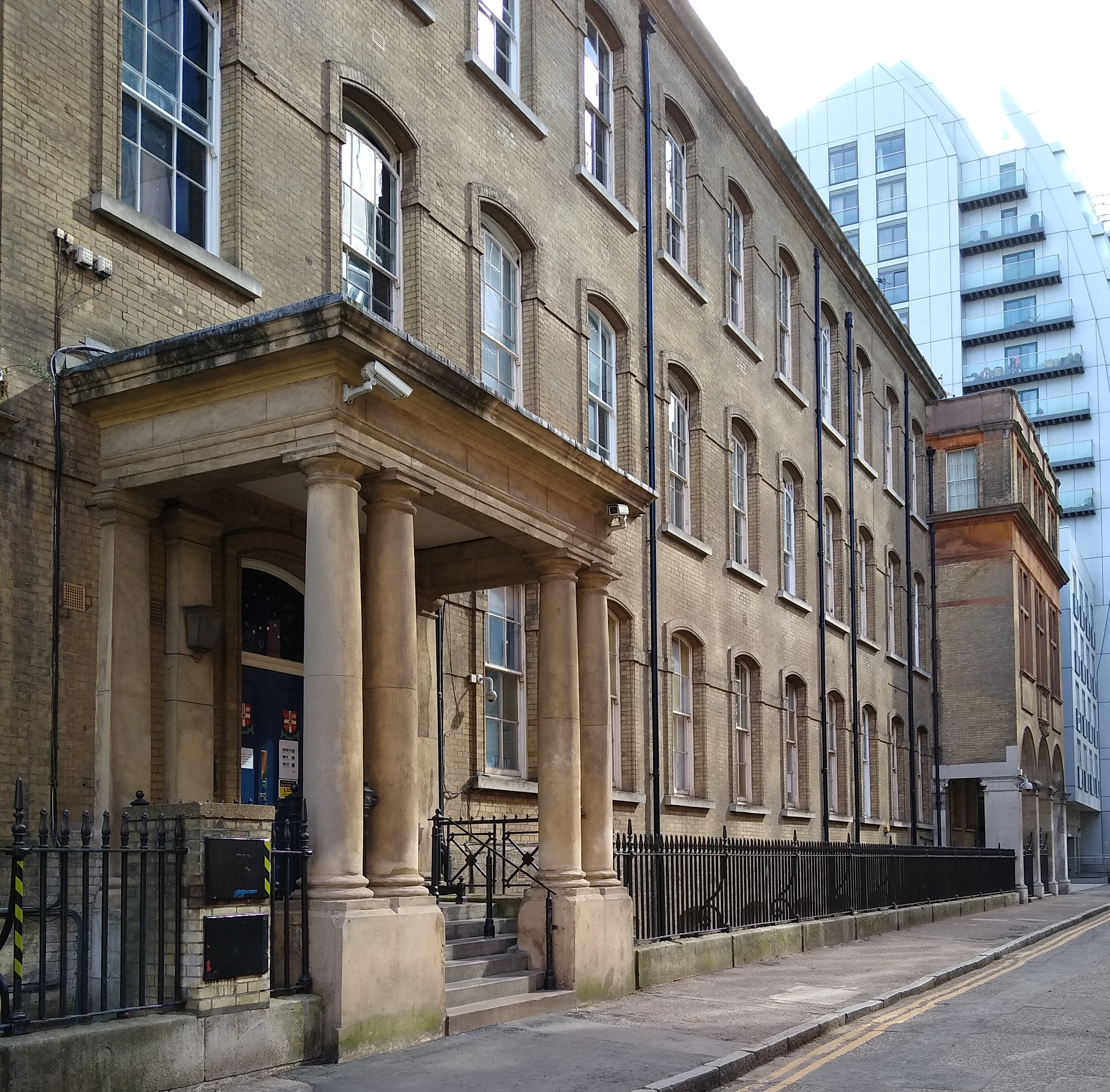

Location
- Cowper Street; Islington, London, EC2A 4SH; United Kingdom

Information
- Type: Voluntary aided comprehensive school
- Motto: Latin: Spe Labore Fide (By hope, by work, by faith)
- Established: 1865
- Local authority: Islington
- Department for Education URN: 100458 Tables
- Ofsted: Reports
- Head teacher: Jamie Brownhill
- Staff: 110
- Gender: Boys (mixed Sixth Form)
- Age: 11 to 18
- Enrolment: 1,137 of which 262 in Sixth Form
- Houses: 7; C, E, N, T, R, A, L
- Colours: Blue and Gold
- Website: http://www.centralfoundationboys.co.uk

Central Foundation Boys' School is a voluntary-aided comprehensive secondary school in the London Borough of Islington. It was founded at a meeting in 1865 and opened the following year in Bath Street, before moving to its current location on Cowper Street in 1869. Originally named The Middle Class School of London, it was renamed in 1890 after the establishment of its trust body, the Central Foundation Schools Trust. Its sister school is Central Foundation Girls' School in Tower Hamlets. Both schools are beneficiaries of the charity Central Foundation Schools of London, which in turn is a beneficiary of The Dulwich Estate, successor to the historic College of God's Gift charity.

There are approximately 1137 pupils in the school aged 11–18, The current Headteacher is Jamie Brownhill who has occupied the post since 2010.

Pupils generally take ten General Certificate of Secondary Education (GCSE) exams in Year Eleven (aged 15–16) and they have a choice of three or four A-levels or a vocational BTEC in the sixth form (16–19). An Office for Standards in Education, Children's Services and Skills (Ofsted) inspection in 2025 (and continuously from 2015) has graded Central Foundation Boys' School as "outstanding", the highest ranking a school can have.

== History ==
=== Formative years (1866–1914) ===
Reverend William Rogers, a social reformer who had already established eight schools, became convinced that London was full of academies for gentlemen and much had been done for the poor but there was little on offer for parents who could afford about £1 (equivalent to £1000 today) for a quarter term for their education. In February 1865 he called a meeting of his wealthy friends at the Mansion House and raised £41,000 for the establishment of a middle class school. The school was opened on Bath Street on 1 October 1866 by Sergeant Edgar at 9:30am. Having started with 300 pupils, by the end of the first year over 700 attended the school. Like his other schools, the building had a previous occupier and was converted into a school but for this venture he wanted a building erected for the purposes of being a school which led him and the Corporation for Middle Class Education for the City of London to purchase a two-acre plot in nearby Cowper Street for £30,000 (equivalent to £30m today) where the school moved to in 1869 and remains to this day. By the time The Great Hall of the main building was erected in 1873, there were over 900 boys in attendance with it reaching 1,000 at its peak.

During its formative years, it had many royal visits including a visit in 1874 by Prince George of Wales (later George V) who suggested the colours of royal blue and gold be adopted as the school colours. Five years later, the Founder's Day guest speaker Lord Lingen noted the school's royal links and asked his friend Sir Albert Woods, Garter Principal King of Arms, to design a coat-of-arms for the school which Lingen then had executed in two dies and stamps. The school Houses were established in 1905 by Mr Wagstaff and in 1926 were given their current names after four men who were important in the early years of the school. In 1910 the school was renamed The Central Foundation School after the Board of Education revises the endowment scheme.

=== 1914 to 1945 ===
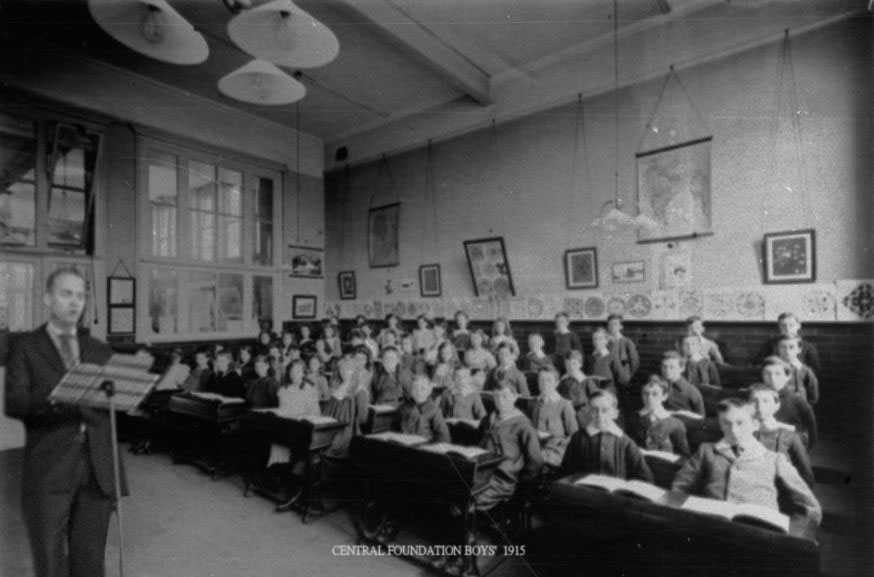
Class room, c. 1915

During the First World War of 1914 to 1918, the school remained in London, despite an unexploded bomb falling through the roof of the Great Hall. Other than this, little damage was suffered, and in 1923 the governors acquired 3.5 acres of land at Muswell Hill for use as playing fields. In 1932 they obtained a lease of the Finsbury Technical College building, to be used as science classrooms and a gymnasium. In 1940, during the Second World War, 450 pupils were evacuated to Newmarket and later to Fakenham. By the time they returned in 1945, only two classrooms could be used, due to damage by bomb blasts and fires during the Blitz. The Great Hall remained closed until 1951, when it was reopened by the Lord Mayor of London. In the decades after the war, the school’s campus continued to grow, with a combination of newly acquired or newly built buildings, and classrooms that had been shut up or destroyed during the war were slowly reopened.

=== Modern era (1945–present) ===
Under the Education Act 1944, tuition fees were abolished and for a short period the school was assisted by the London County Council until it became an aided Grammar School in 1952, with three form entry and 450 pupils in the main school. In 1966 a service of thanksgiving was held on 4 October at the Church of St Botolph to celebrate the school's centenary. In the same year, the first bricks were laid on the construction of a three-storey site primarily to house the Sixth Form but also including extra science classrooms. The following decade Whitefield's Tabernacle was acquired and converted into a games hall and art room. The tabernacle has now been refurbished into the creative arts centre housing a drama and art classroom.

In the wake of Circular 10/65, the school began its transition from grammar to a voluntary-aided comprehensive school in 1975. In 2006 the building which had been leased to the council for use as a court expired and returned to school ownership, it was refurbished across the following two years. Shortly after this the on-site playing fields and staff car park were refurbished into an all-seasons, covered AstroTurf pitch.

Amidst changes in government targets, the school's exam results have been improving since 2010, with a 17% rise in GCSE grades that year before breaking the Islington record for the highest GCSE grades achieved by any school in the borough with 82% of pupils achieving 5 A* – Cs including English and maths in 2013. This record was broken once again in 2014. In 2016 the government restructured league tables to focus on progress as well as attainment which saw the school place as the highest ranked non-selective boys' school in the country and 63 out of all 3098 schools. In 2015 the school was rated outstanding by Ofsted.

A site-wide regeneration project was completed in 2023, involving an overhaul of the school's internal facilities and the playground area.

== School structure ==
=== Key stage groups ===
Pupils enter at Year 7, aged 11 years old, with a current intake of 150 boys split into 7 forms of under 20 pupils per form group. This number has fluctuated regularly throughout the history of the school to reflect the surrounding area. In their first three years they undertake a prescribed timetable of subjects and sit exams at the end of each year. In Year 10 the boys enter Key Stage 4 and begin preparing for their GCSE certificates. This involves choosing optional subjects alongside core subjects of English, maths and science. Exams are sat at the end of Year 11. Pupils can then choose to continue onto sixth form or leave the school.

=== House system ===
The house system was first introduced by Mr Wagstaff in 1906; at the time it was one of the first day schools to have one. Originally the houses were briefly named after colours (Red, Blue, White and Amber) before being named after the letters A, B, C and D, respectively, the following year. In 1926 Mr Gibson renamed them after men who had done the school great service in its formative years and associated one quarter of the coat-of-arms to each house as a badge. A was renamed Alleyn after Edward Alleyn, the Renaissance actor whose foundation, College of God's Gift, funded the school from 1891. B was renamed Gassiot after John Peter Gassiot, a businessman who was treasurer from the school's opening and each year would make good the deficit. C was renamed Rogers after Reverend William Rogers, the principal founder of the school. D was renamed Wormell after Dr Richard Wormell, the Second Master at the school's opening who rose to Headmaster in 1874 and remained at the school until his retirement in 1897, keeping close ties to the Old Cowperians Society thereafter.

== Admission ==
The school is comprehensive, which means it has a mixed ability intake and has to admit pupils first judged by their ability level and then by proximity to the school. Pupils who apply sit a test at the school which will then place them in one of four ability bands. After being placed within the four bands, each grouping is then filled up in order of priority to those who are adopted or in care, those with special educational needs, those with siblings already at the school and finally by proximity to the school. 150 pupils are admitted into each year.

== Curriculum ==
The school follows the National Curriculum in Years 7–11 and offers a broad range of GCSEs (national exams taken by students aged 14–16), A-levels (national exams taken by pupils aged 16–19) and BTEC diplomas (vocational courses taken by pupils aged 16–19). The school has no affiliation with a particular religious denomination, but religious education is given throughout the school, and boys may opt to take the subject as part of their GCSE course. Each Year group has a morning assembly once a week, while Tuesday mornings see a whole school assembly in the Great Hall led by the Headmaster and other senior members of staff and focus on current affairs, topical issues and other elements not covered by the syllabus. Students participate in a number of educational visits and excursions throughout their school career, such as an annual Year 7 visit to Whipsnade Zoo or Epping Forest for Geography and Year 13 Physics visit to CERN. The curriculum comprises English, mathematics, French, history, geography, physics, chemistry, biology, art, drama, music, design technology, religious education, physical education and games. In the second year students are divided based on their ability in Maths and by Year 9 they are also divided this way in English and science. Boys take around ten subjects for GCSE in Year 10: English (language and literature), Mathematics and science, supplemented by other subjects from those listed above.

In the sixth form, pupils study four AS-level (the equivalent of half an A-level qualification) subjects for one year and usually continue with three subjects to A-level. Due to the sixth form consortium with other schools, a wider choice of subjects is offered at A-level. The sixth form also offers BTEC Diplomas which are vocational courses based around a single subject and are taught exclusively at Central Foundation rather than across the consortium.

The school year runs from September to July, split across three terms: the autumn term (September to December), spring term (January to April) and the summer term (April to July). Students receive two weeks off for Christmas and Easter, a six-week summer break, and three breaks of a week during each term.

=== Examination ===
Until the establishment of the General Certificate of Education, exams were set once a year by an external examiner(s) appointed by the governors, who reported on the proficiency of pupils and the condition of the school.

The school later adopted the General Certificate of Education. Currently the school offers GCSEs to pupils typically in Year 11.

Students mostly take their A level exams at the end of Year 13, though some subjects are modular, while the BTEC courses are examined in controlled assessments at checkpoints throughout the two-year course. Exam results have significantly risen in the 2010s for GCSEs and remained high for A level and BTEC. Upwards of 80% of pupils achieve A* – C grades in at least five of their GCSE subjects including English and maths which had been used by the government as a benchmark; Central Foundation was the first school in Islington to break the 80% barrier. In the Sixth Form the pass rate is regularly between 99–100%, with about two thirds of students achieving Cs or above. As well as being one of the highest ranked all-boys comprehensives in the country, the maths department is regularly in the top 5% of departments nationwide.

== Extra-curricular activities ==
There are over 40 before and after school clubs taking place in the week. Music School takes place before school every morning from 8am, or 7:30 if breakfast is included. Instrumental lessons and the instruments themselves are provided by the school and include junior and senior choirs, chamber orchestra, string quartet, brass band, concert band, guitar groups and full orchestra. Music School perform an annual winter and summer concert, the school's Founder's Day and for partner groups of the school including Wesley's Chapel, Inmarsat and Slaughter & May.

The debating society is popular. Historically, debates were held internally on topical issues recorded in The Cowperian while in recent years the Year 7s take part in a local DebateIt competition and higher years compete in the nationwide DebateMate tournament. The school has regularly been finalists in the DebateMate Urban League and in 2013 were national champions in the DebateMate Cup.

The school offers football, cricket, basketball, boxing, fencing, table tennis, rock climbing and athletics. Football is the most popular sport and the school has won the Camden and Islington Cup for 2015 and 2016, and competes in the Inner London Cup. The school are also reigning champions in the Islington Athletics Championship, which they have won since 2012. The school also holds an annual Sports Day in the summer at Finsbury Park, where the four houses compete against each other for points in the House Cup.

== Property ==
The Middle Class School was originally opened at a former home for Huguenot weavers on Bath Street. This premises was secured for three years and was always intended as a temporary residence until a permanent site was found.

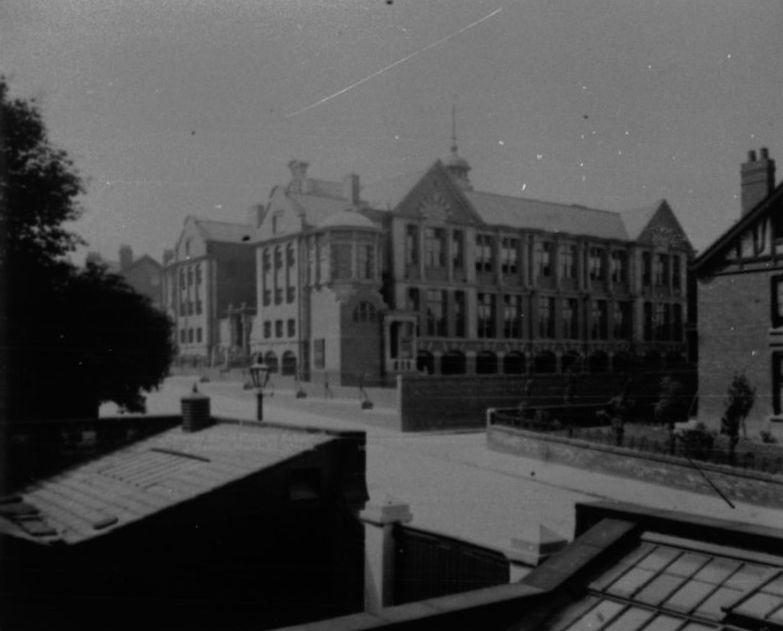
Exterior, c. 1915

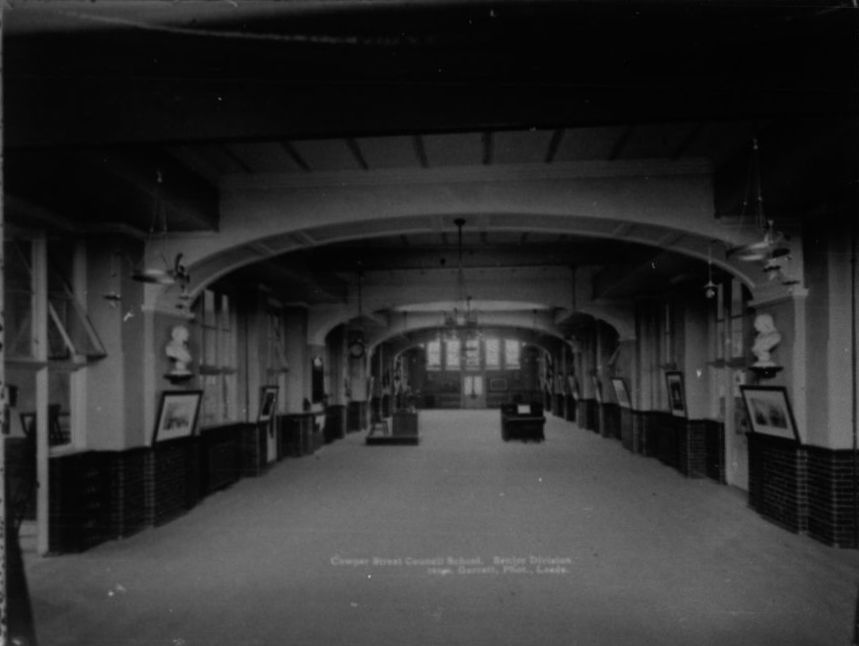
Interior, c. 1915

At some point in 1867 a two-acre site on Cowper Street was bought and began development. The earliest whole school photograph, dated April 1867, shows the boys and their masters in the playground at Bath Street, with the Headmaster and architect looking at plans for the Cowper Street development. The new building was opened on 29 February 1869 and The Great Hall was opened on 24 July 1873. The teaching space was expanded slightly in 1894 when the science extension was erected, opening up the original building for an increasing number of applicants. The school now has four blocks of teaching areas and the number of pupils taught in the school is 840. During the First World War, little damage was suffered but an unexploded bomb fell through the roof of the Great Hall.

Adjacent to the school in its early years was the country's first technical college, the Finsbury Technical College, which was open from 1884 to 1924. In 1932 the Governors leased the then-abandoned building as it was already designed to facilitate chemistry and physics laboratories. The ground floor was converted into a gymnasium, which remains to this day, and an art room was also built. The lease was late purchased in 1962 for £14,000.

During the Second World War the site was evacuated and in its absence the Blitz caused extensive damage. In 1944 the school presented Fakenham School with a trophy as thanks for hosting it during the evacuation, hopeful that they would return that year. However the damage made this impossible until the end of 1945. Even then, only two classrooms were fit for purpose. Slowly repairs were undertaken and bit by bit the school was re-opened. The Lord Mayor reopened the Great Hall in 1951 and the Duchess of Gloucester opened the Physics Lecture Theatre in 1954.

In 1966 a £92,000 contract was commissioned for the Sixth Form Building which connected the Science Extension to the Finsbury Technical College Building. The new building, opened in 1968, could not match the varying styles, roof lines, nor the room height of the existing buildings and so, while there are corridors and staircases linking all three buildings, the floors are inconsistent. The new building provided the sixth form with a common room as well as a library, laboratory and art and pottery room. The library remained there until 2008 and the sixth form common room was returned in 2014 after moving to the other side of the site. As was intended at the time, the land fronting the site was later landscaped for football, cricket and tennis lessons, however hopes for a swimming pool never materialised.

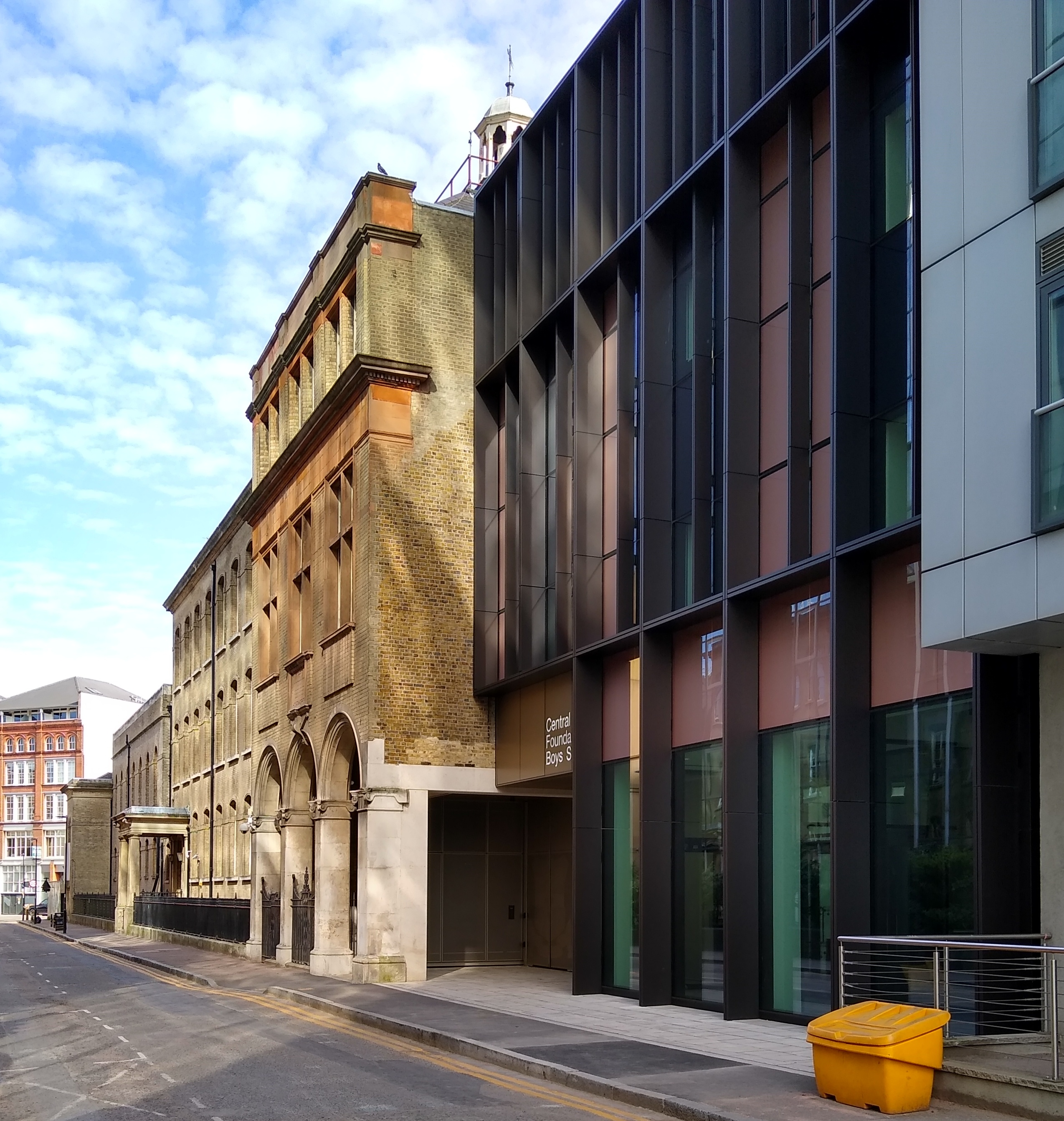
Central Foundation Boys' School, pictured in 2021

In 1974 the governors acquired Whitefield's Tabernacle on the far side of the school yard. At the time, funds were found to provide a games hall and art room. From 1988 to 1995 the Department of Education helped fund the conversion of the ground floor into six additional teaching rooms, chiefly used for maths and law. In 2006, the County Court's tenancy expired and the building was returned to the school. The building underwent a two-year renovation which saw the library move to the Court Building, a new lecture theatre open and computer provision at every desk. The most recent change to the grounds came in 2007 when the governors sold the playing fields and car park at the front of the Sixth Form Building to create the Bézier luxury flats, in order to fund an all-seasons covered Astroturf pitch as well as the Court Building's refurbishment.

The school completed a full renovation project in 2023. The new facilities include science laboratories and a subterranean sports hall. The Tabernacle was transformed into a performance space for drama, art, and music. The existing buildings were refurbished and new-build infills were only considered when it was not possible to provide specialist learning spaces within existing structures. This project has been covered by the Architect's Journal and Dezeen.

Summary: • Laboratory building • Extensive refurbishment of existing listed buildings • New underground sports hall • Conversion of the Tabernacle into a new Creative Arts Center

Architect: Hawkins\Brown

== Notable former pupils ==
- Martin Allen, missing since 1979
- Denzeil Boadu, footballer
- Sir Ernest Benn CBE, publisher and writer
- Selig Brodetsky, Professor of Applied Mathematics from 1924–48 at the University of Leeds, President of the Board of Deputies of British Jews, President of the Hebrew University of Jerusalem
- Jacob Bronowski, mathematician, biologist and historian, author of The Ascent of Man
- Barney Clark, actor
- Aubrey Diamond, Professor of Law from 1987–99 at University of Notre Dame, and President from 1988–90 of the British Insurance Law Association]
- John Forrest, pioneer of preventative dentistry, and President of the British Society of Periodontology and British Endodontic Society
- Danny Foster, member of pop group Hear'say
- Henry Goodman, Award Winning actor
- Anthony Grabiner, Baron Grabiner, barrister, Deputy High Court Judge, member of the Bank of England Financial Services Law Committee (2002–05), non-executive chairman of Arcadia Group Ltd
- Max Hamilton, first President of the British Association Of Psychopharmacology, inventor of the Hamilton Rating Scale for Depression, and former President of the British Psychological Society
- John Halls, footballer
- Charlie G. Hawkins, actor
- Hyman Abraham Isaacs, renamed Hyman Raphael Hurst, renamed Paul Brunton, philosopher, author of spiritual books, journalist and traveller
- Martin Kemp, actor and bassist with Spandau Ballet
- Nyman Levin, Director from 1959–65 of the Atomic Weapons Research Establishment
- Ashley Montagu, Professor of Anthropology from 1949–55 at Rutgers University
- Trevor Nelson MBE, broadcaster and DJ
- Daniel Pedoe, mathematician
- Woolf Phillips, orchestra leader
- Max Rayne, Baron Rayne, property developer, supporter of medical, educational, religious and arts charities
- Leonard Sainer, businessman who helped set up Sears plc
- Ronnie Scott, jazz tenor saxophonist and founder of jazz club Ronnie Scott's
- Richard Seifert, architect, Centre Point, Tower 42 and King's Reach Tower
- Reuben Smeed CBE, transport researcher known for Smeed's law
- Sir Michael Sobell Businessman and philanthropist
- Alan Stuart, Professor of Statistics from 1966–82 at the LSE
- Reggie Yates, TV presenter and radio DJ
