= Southwell Business Park =

Business park in Dorset, England

Coordinates: 50.52873°N 2.45245°W

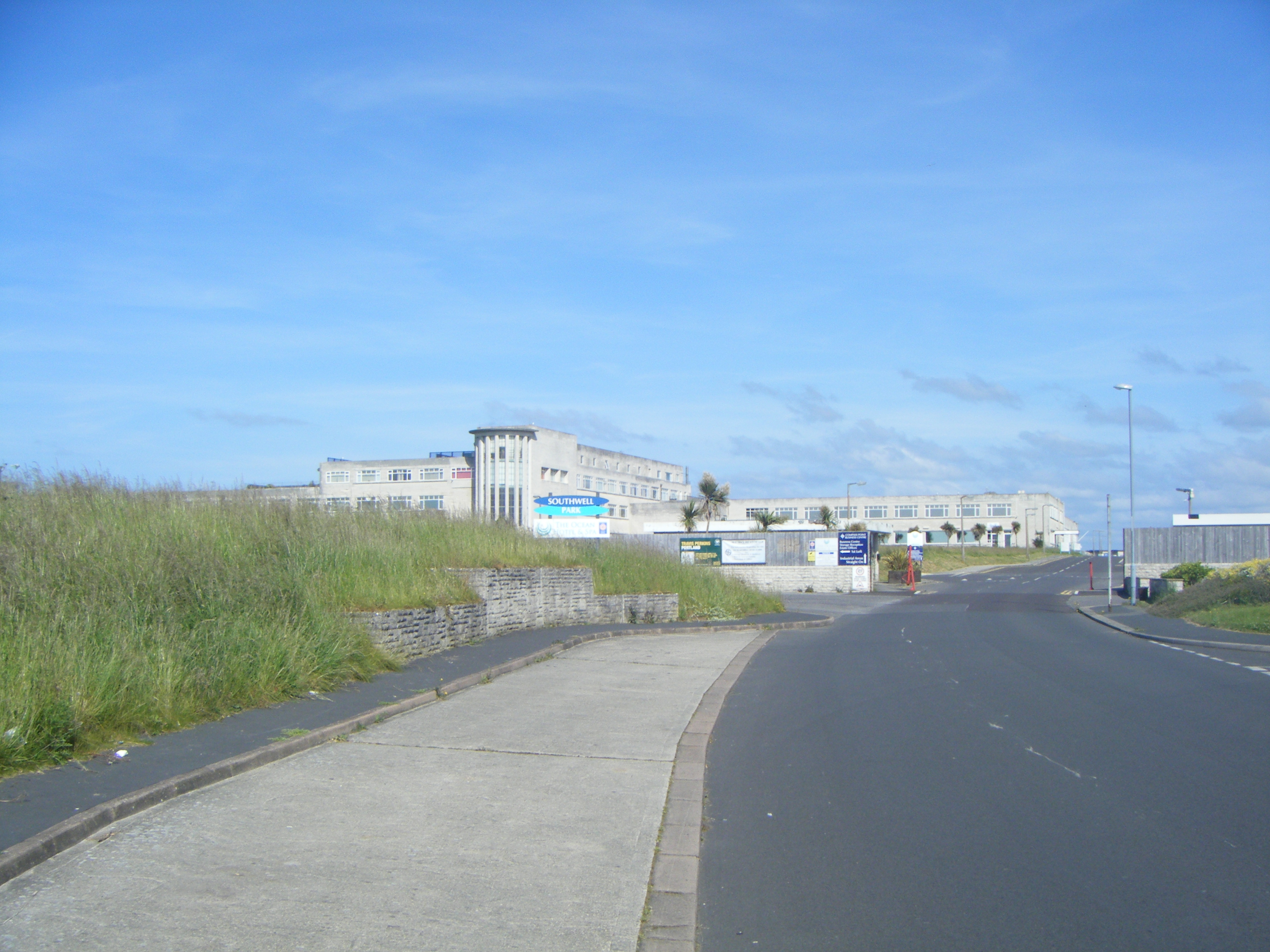
The entrance of the business park, as seen in 2014.

Southwell Business Park is a business park on the Isle of Portland, Dorset, England. It is housed at the former Admiralty Underwater Weapons Establishment, which closed in 1995 and became the Southwell Business Park in 1997.

== History ==
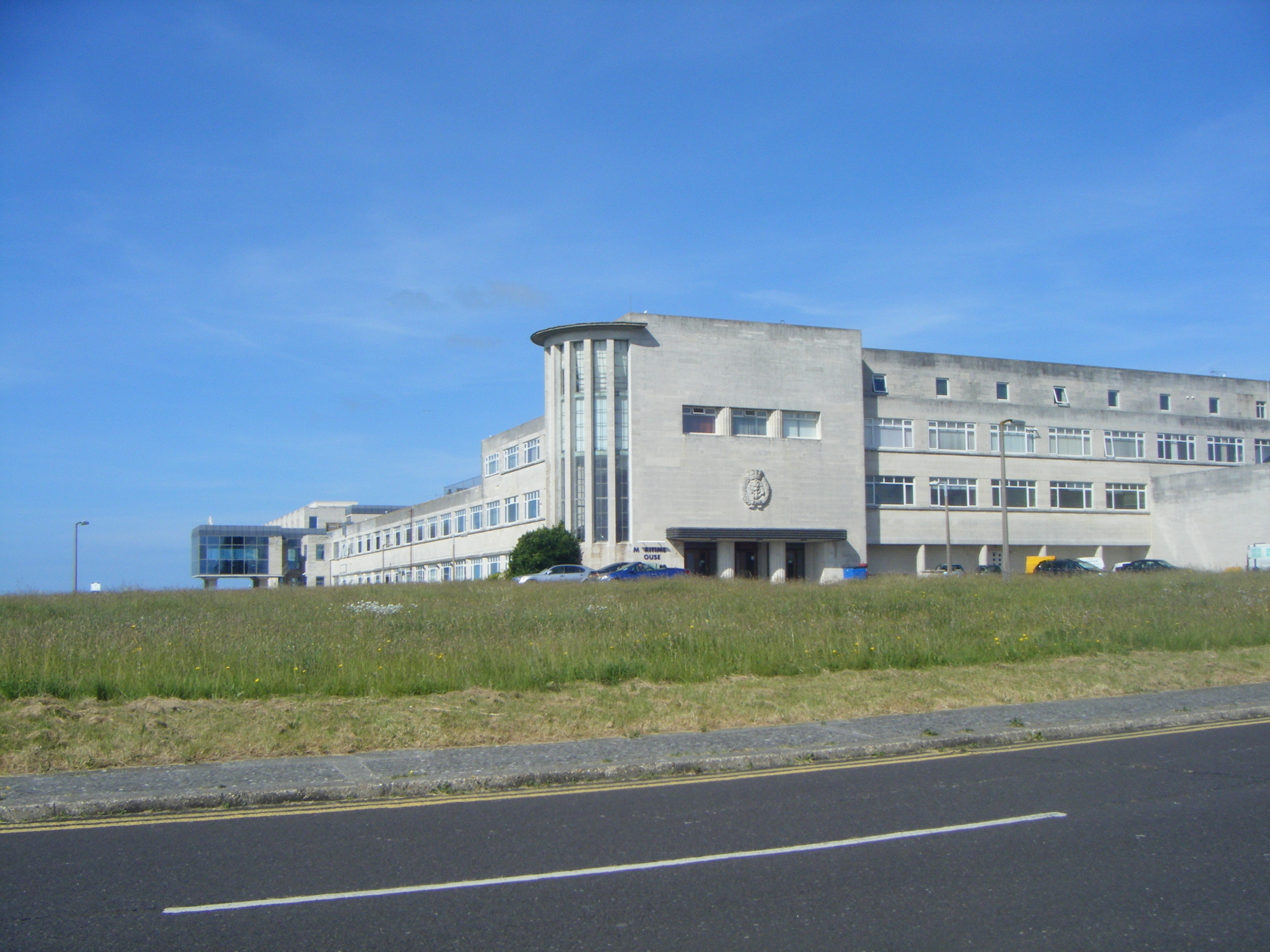
The establishment as it remains today, now the Southwell Business Park.

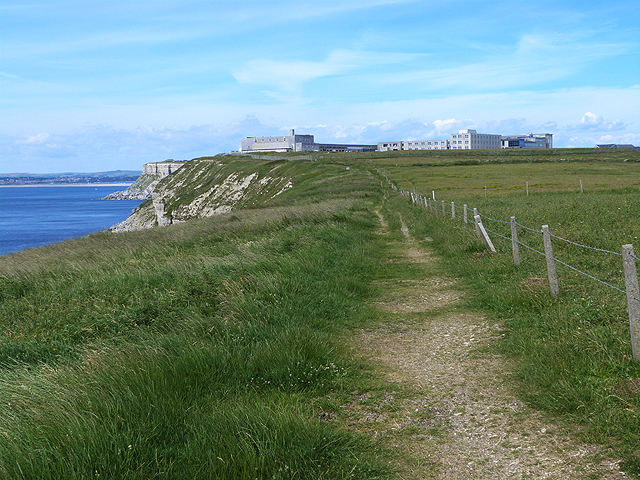
The establishment can be clearly seen on the skyline from various parts of Portland, particularly from the South West Coast Path which runs around the edge of the establishment.

The Admiralty Underwater Weapons Establishment, built as a Gunnery Establishment at the beginning of the Cold War, was closed in 1995 alongside Portland's naval base. The establishment buildings remained empty for two years, until Roy Haywood and Ray Bulpit, whose business was the acquisition and development of former military sites, purchased the site in 1997. The first tenants of Southwell Business Park arrived that year, and the park continued to expand its range of business tenants. In the 2000s, the site was recorded as employing almost 500 people and being home to over 100 businesses. It was estimated that the total turnover generated at the park from 1997 to 2008 reached over £200 million.

In 2006, work commenced on developing unused parts of the park, including an unused 1970s-built wing, into the Portland Spa and an 80-bedroom hotel, known as the Venue Hotel. Completed in 2007, the spa included a gym, a fitness studio and an indoor swimming pool. The Orchid Restaurant was also converted from the former AUWE canteen. It was later renamed to the Cliff Panoramic Restaurant and Bar. In 2010, the park went into administration after the UK recession made it difficult to repay borrowed money used to create the spa and hotel. The site was sold to Compass Point Estates. After a succession of ownership changes and names, the tenants of the Ocean Spa took over the hotel and restaurant in 2013.

In 2016, the Isle of Portland Aldridge Community Academy's new £14 million campus was opened within the park. The Ocean Spa and Hotel had closed in 2014 due to the new school premises, however by 2015 the hotel had reopened with new management, and was named Ocean Hotel and Bar. The hotel is currently known as the Maritime Hotel.

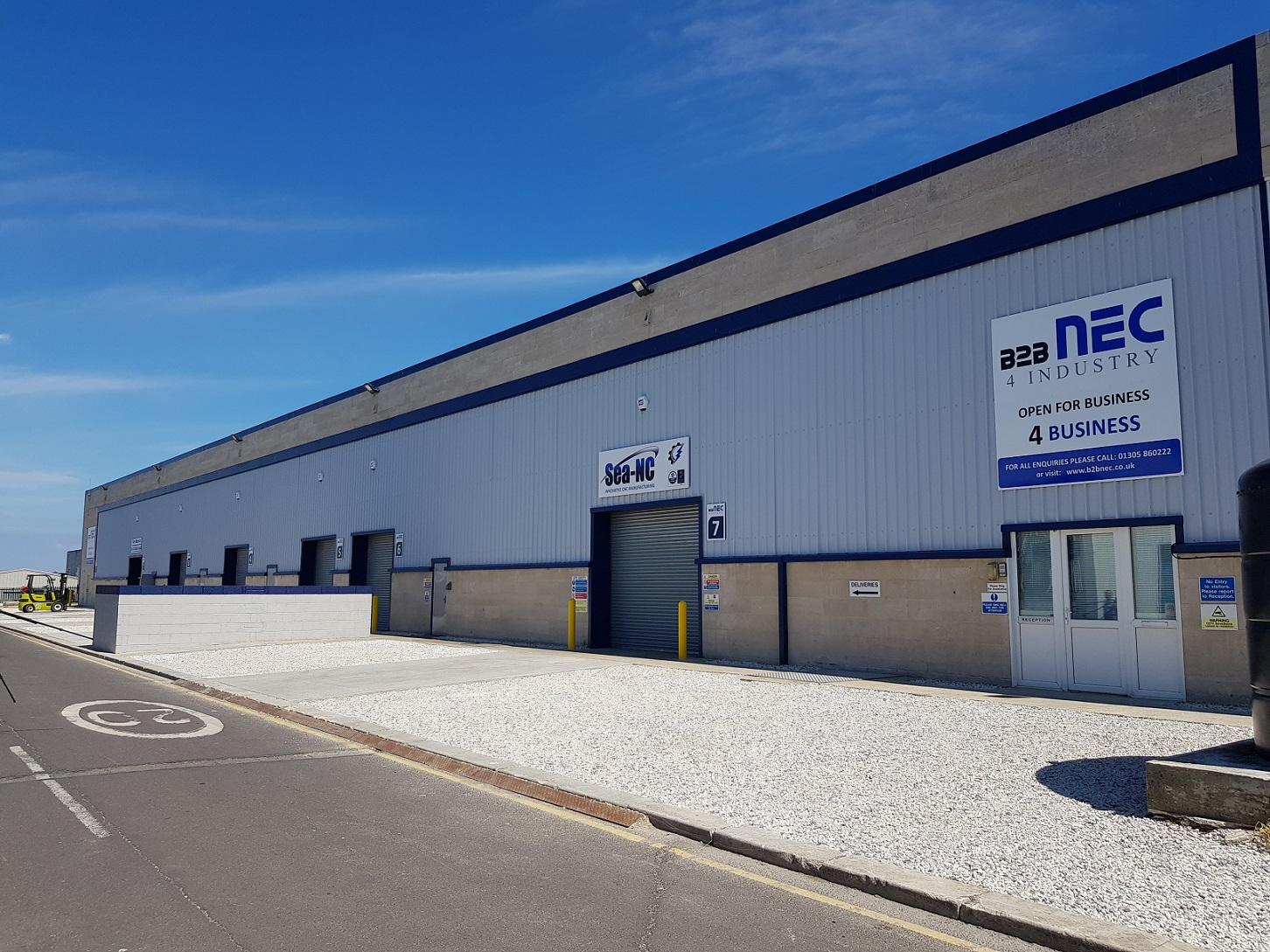
Southwell Business Park, Portland, Southway road view of the Network Enterprise Complex 2018

In 2017, business and enterprise director Calvin Samways acquired a stretch of real estate at Southwell Business Park from the Compass Point Estates for a six figure sum. The unused site was then redeveloped into seven industrial units, named the Network Enterprise Complex (NEC). It was officially opened in 2018 by South Dorset MP Richard Drax and Weymouth and Portland's Mayor and Mayoress.
