= Admiralty Marine Technology Establishment =

Defence research establishments of United Kingdom

Department overview
- Formed: 1977
- Dissolved: 1984
- Superseding Department: Admiralty Research Establishment
- Jurisdiction: Government of the United Kingdom
- Parent Department: Admiralty

The Admiralty Marine Technology Establishment was formed in 1977 by the merger of the Admiralty Experiment Works, the Admiralty Materials Laboratory, the Admiralty Research Laboratory, the Central Dockyard Laboratory, the Naval Construction Research Establishment, the Royal Naval Physiological Laboratory, and the Admiralty Experimental Diving Unit at HMS Vernon.

In 1984 the Admiralty Marine Technology Establishment became part of the Admiralty Research Establishment.
