= Bincleaves Groyne =

Coastal defence structure in Weymouth, England

Coordinates: 50.5993°N 2.4428°W

Bincleaves Groyne is a breakwater located off the southern area of Weymouth, England. It is the second largest of four breakwaters which create Portland Harbour. It is separated from the Northeastern Breakwater by the North Ship Channel. A landing stage is situated on the southern side of the breakwater near the Western Ledges.

Bincleaves Groyne features the C Pier Head Battery on the southern tip. The arm is an Admiralty extension to the earlier breakwater built by the Great Western Railway and known as the Bincleaves Groyne. The head is 100 ft in diameter. The battery was opened in 1901 and was armed with two 12-pounder quick-firing (QF) guns for anti-torpedo craft defence. By the First World War the 12-pounder guns had been removed and replaced with a 6-inch breech-loading (BL) Mk. VII gun. The 6-inch gun was removed in 1924 and in 1934 two 12-pounder guns were transferred across from the recently decommissioned B Pier Head. In 1944 emplacements were constructed for two 6-pounder guns, but the guns were not mounted for a number of years. During the Second World War the battery was manned by 107 Battery of 522 Coast Regiment. A field visit in 1983 found the structure to be extant.

At the C Pier Head Battery a World War II petroleum warfare site was constructed in 1940–41, and comprised a flame thrower. However the field visit in 1983 had found the site had been demolished. On site is a World War II 29 millimetre spigot mortar emplacement (pedestal). It was constructed after May 1941 and is built of concrete and steel. The field visit in 1983 found the structure to be in a good condition. Almost within the centre of the arm another 29 millimetre spigot mortar emplacement is located near Military Pier. Again it was constructed after May 1941, of concrete and steel, and remains in good condition.

The A Pier Head Battery is located on the outer breakwater where the Portland Breakwater Lighthouse is situated, and B Pier Head Battery is located on side of this arm.
