= Admiralty Gunnery Establishment =

UK navy research department

Department overview
- Formed: 1931
- Preceding Department: Fire Control Group, Admiralty Research Laboratory
- Dissolved: 1959
- Superseding Department: Admiralty Surface Weapons Establishment
- Jurisdiction: Government of the United Kingdom
- Headquarters: Haslemere, England
- Department executive: Superintendent Admiralty Gunnery Establishment
- Parent Department: Admiralty

The Admiralty Gunnery Establishment (AGE), originally known as Fire Control Group (ARL) and later known as the Admiralty Surface Weapons Establishment (ASWE), was an admiralty research department primarily responsible for Army and Navy gunfire control work between 1931 and 1959.

== History ==
The Admiralty Gunnery Establishment (AGE) was originally formed as the Fire Control Group of the Admiralty Research Laboratory (ARL) at Teddington, Middlesex, England. The name "fire control" in Naval terminology is always applied to the control of gunfire. It was established as a separate establishment in 1943 under the control of the Director of Naval Ordnance. The AGE assumed responsibility for both Army and Navy fire control work . It remained at Teddington until 1954 when it moved to a new site on Portland Bill with new buildings and test facilities. In 1959 the Admiralty Gunnery Establishment and most of its functions were amalgamated with the Admiralty Signals and Radar Establishment (ASRE) to form the Admiralty Surface Weapons Establishment (ASWE) that was located at Portsdown Hill the remaining functions were transferred to the Armament Research and Development (ARDE) based at Fort Halstead, the North Downs.

The establishment was administered by the Superintendent Admiralty Gunnery Establishment.

== Timeline ==
- Admiralty Research Laboratory, Fire Control Group, (1931–1943)
- Admiralty Gunnery Establishment, (1943–1959)
- Admiralty Surface Weapons Establishment (ASWE), Portsdown, Portsmouth (1959–1984)
