= Admiralty Signals and Radar Establishment =

Research organization of the British Royal Navy

Admiralty Signal and Radar Establishment

Department overview
- Formed: 1917
- Preceding Department: Experimental Department, HM Signal School, Portsmouth
- Dissolved: 1959
- Superseding Department: Admiralty Surface Weapons Establishment
- Jurisdiction: Government of the United Kingdom
- Headquarters: Haslemere, England
- Parent Department: Admiralty

The Admiralty Signal and Radar Establishment (ASRE) originally known as the Experimental Department and later known as the Admiralty Signal Establishment (ASE) was a research organisation of the British Royal Navy established in 1917. It existed until 1959 when it was merged with the Admiralty Gunnery Establishment to form the Admiralty Surface Weapons Establishment (ASWE). Its headquarters were located in Haslemere, Surrey, England.

== History ==
The Admiralty Signal and Radar Establishment began as the Admiralty Experimental Department that was set up in 1917 at HM Signal School, Portsmouth, to coordinate research work undertaken since 1896 on the Torpedo School ships HMS Defiance and HMS Vernon.

=== Admiralty Signal Establishment (1941-1948) ===
Concern had already arisen in 1940 as regards the vulnerability of HM Signal School to Luftwaffe bombing, but a raid in the autumn of 1940 brought matters to a head, and the move was initiated. In April 1941 the Experimental Department was renamed the Admiralty Signal Establishment (ASE) which, like its predecessors, was primarily focused on communications. Premises were found in Lythe Hill House, Haslemere, and in August 1941, the ASE became a separate establishment. Basil Willett was the Captain Superintendent. Other staff included Christopher Bareford, who had a senior management role, Peter Trier, Norman Goddard, Maurice Kelliher, Bryan Overton and Guy Birkbeck An extension was set up at the Marconi Research Laboratory in Great Baddow on premises which were shared with an Air Ministry Research Station as well as an R.A.F. operational station.

In July 1943 a delegation came from the USA to discuss radar and communications. The discussions included Henry Tizard, Cecil Horton, Cedric Holland and George Thomson. However, technological advances during the Second World War necessitated an increase in related fields of research, and in 1948 these were brought under one body, the Admiralty Signal and Radar Establishment at Portsmouth. In 1959 it was merged with the Admiralty Gunnery Establishment (AGE) to form the Admiralty Surface Weapons Establishment (ASWE).

== Timeline ==
- Admiralty Experimental Department, (1917–1941)
- Admiralty Signal Establishment, (1941–1948)
- Admiralty Signal and Radar Establishment, Portsmouth (1948–1959)
- Admiralty Surface Weapons Establishment (ASWE), Portsdown, Portsmouth (1959–1984)
