= Admiralty Research Establishment =

British naval research institution

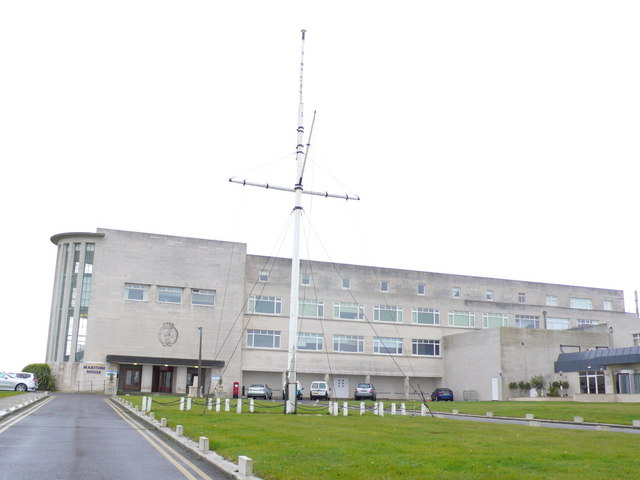
- Old Admiralty Research Establishment Portland

Establishment overview
- Formed: 1984
- Preceding agencies: Admiralty Surface Weapons Establishment; Admiralty Marine Technology Establishment; Admiralty Underwater Weapons Establishment
- Dissolved: April 1, 1991
- Superseding Establishment: Defence Research Agency
- Type: Establishment

The Admiralty Research Establishment (commonly known as ARE) was formed on 1 April 1984 from various Admiralty establishments. It became part of the Defence Research Agency on 1 April 1991.

== Constituent parts on formation ==
- Admiralty Surface Weapons Establishment (ASWE), Portsdown, Portsmouth (1959–1984)
- Admiralty Marine Technology Establishment (1978–1984) – formed from amalgamation of other research departments in 1977
- Admiralty Underwater Weapons Establishment (AUWE), Portland, Dorset (1959–1984).
