= Japanese 45 cm torpedo =

Japanese weapon used by ships, submarines, and aircraft

Numerous 45 cm (17.7-inch or 18-inch) torpedoes have been used by the Imperial Japanese Navy and Imperial Japanese Navy Air Service. The size category has not been used by Japan since the end of the Second World War.

Torpedoes of 18-inch caliber were much more common during the early 20th century. Historically, this size category was often used by aircraft. Submarines and surface ships generally used 53 cm torpedoes, and surface ships additionally used 61 cm torpedoes. Japan also employs 32 cm torpedoes which conform to the NATO 12.75-inch (323.8mm) standard originally defined by the dimensions of the Mark 46 torpedo; these are dedicated ASW weapons, often delivered via aircraft. Due to their historical importance, this page also includes the smaller 14-inch (35.6cm) predecessors to the 45 cm torpedoes, and some of the miscellaneous developments during the Second World War.

Up to the beginning of the First World War, Japan had used more torpedoes against live targets than all the other navies of the world combined. During that time period, the torpedoes listed in this article were the primary ones employed.

Prior to 6 October 1917, imperial measurements were used. After this date, metric units were used. As such, the 18-inch torpedoes were designated as 45 cm torpedoes. Japanese torpedoes have usually conformed to the 45 cm (17.7-inch or 18-inch), the 53 cm (21-inch), and the 61 cm (24-inch) calibers.

The Japanese type designation scheme has mostly used three different approaches. Units designed prior to the end of the Second World War relied on the traditional Japanese calendar and were designated by either the regnal era year or the imperial year. In 1873, the Gregorian calendar was introduced in Japan; during the latter half of the 20th century, Japan increasingly switched to using this system, and as such, more recent torpedoes have type designations denoting Gregorian years. As an example of all three systems, a torpedo designed or accepted for service in 1980 could potentially be called either a Type 55 (Showa Era year 55), a Type 40 (Imperial Year 2640), or a Type 80 (Gregorian year 1980).

== Predecessors ==
Following the proclamation of the Meiji Restoration, the subsequent Boshin War, and the ramifications of its resolution, Japan rapidly modernized. This included the adoption of new technologies for its navy. Prior to Japan developing its own torpedoes, specimens were purchased from Schwartzkopff and Whitehead during the 1880s and 1890s. These would see use in the Sino-Japanese War and the Russo-Japanese War. The use of torpedoes during these two wars proved highly successful, and had a long-lasting effect on Japanese naval doctrine.

These early torpedoes, all with a 14-inch (35.6 cm) diameter, were sold on the global market with very little restriction. International clients would often purchase knock-down kits and complete assembly of the weapons in their respective countries, both to save money and avoid the difficulty of having torpedo warheads shipped to them. Schwartzkopff's torpedoes were more expensive, but more desirable for smaller navies due to their bronze construction, because steel required constant careful maintenance to stave off corrosion. Whitehead would become especially prominent, with the factory in Fiume reaching an annual output of 800 torpedoes after 1875. Early models from both firms varied in size as they were incrementally developed. Upon adoption for Japanese service, the torpedoes received type designations, as well as the label of either "Shu" (シュ) or "Ho" (ホ), which corresponded to the first syllable of the developer's name ("Schwartzkopff" was spelled as シュワルツコフ, and "Whitehead" was spelled as ホワイトヘッド). After 1892, Whitehead torpedoes outclassed all rival designs of the 19th century. Japan would switch all of its future orders for torpedoes to Whitehead, beginning in 1895. The early 14-inch torpedoes would see active use on Japanese ships, such as Matsushima and Yoshino. Although purchases of Schwartzkopff torpedoes ceased in 1895, and numerous torpedoes were expended in warfare, British intelligence reported in 1908 that approximately 800 Schwartzkopff torpedoes in four variations remained in active service stockpiles, obtained from sources which were unaccounted for. According to the report, aside from the Shu Types 84 and 88, there was a faster version of the Shu Type 84 (24 knots) and a heavier version of the Shu Type 88 (90 kg warhead).

Specifications:

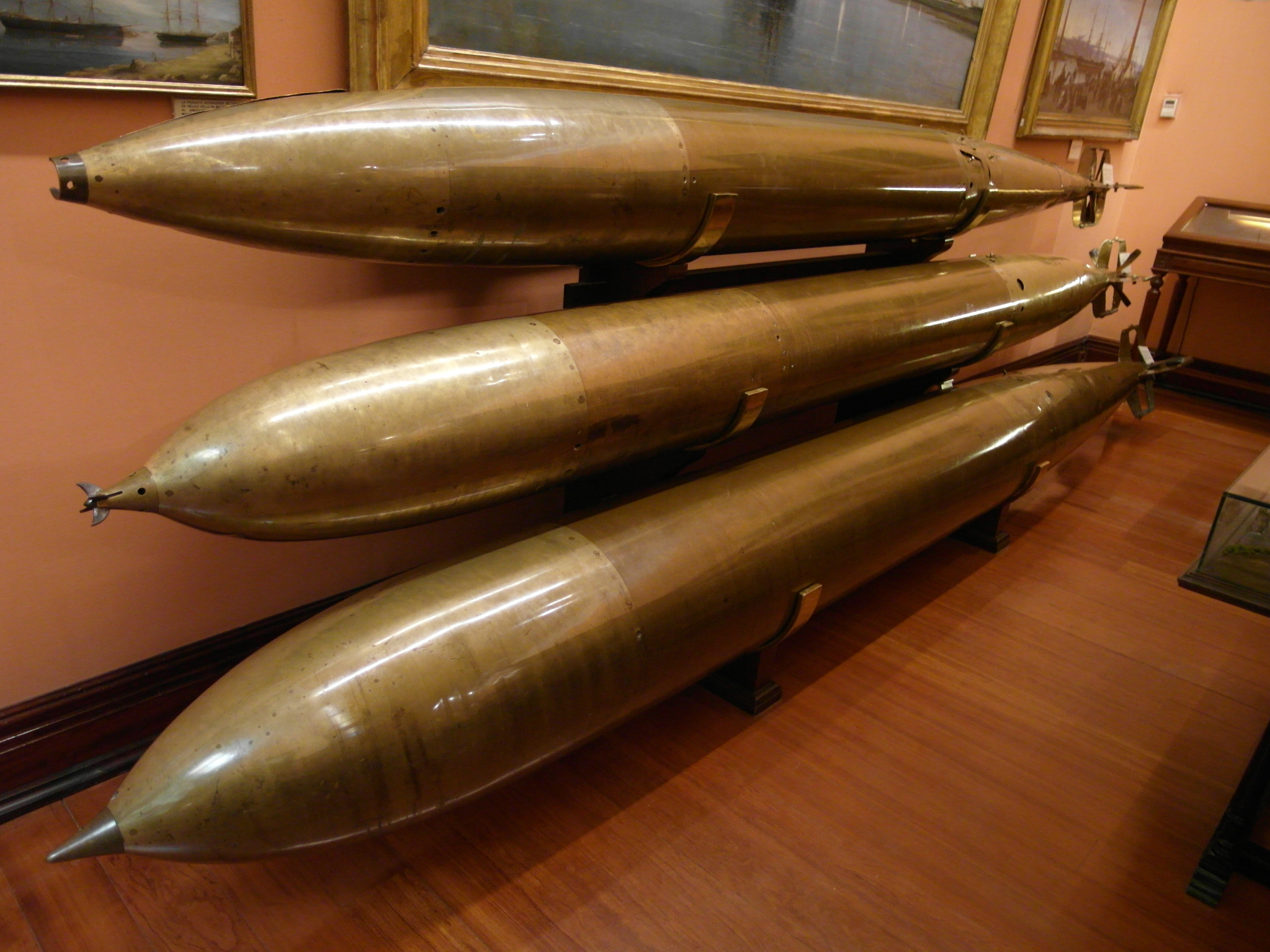
Three versions of Schwartzkopff torpedoes at the Naval Museum of Madrid. The body was constructed from bronze, greatly resistant to corrosion.

Shu Type 84

- Entered service: 1884
- Propulsion: Compressed air
- Weight: 275 kg (606 lb)
- Length: 4.57 m (15.0 ft)
- Explosive charge: 20 kg (44 lb) Guncotton
- Range and speed: 400 m (0.22 nmi) at 22 kn (41 km/h)
- Notes: Purchased from Schwartzkopff, model of 1883. Bronze body. A total of 200 units were purchased.

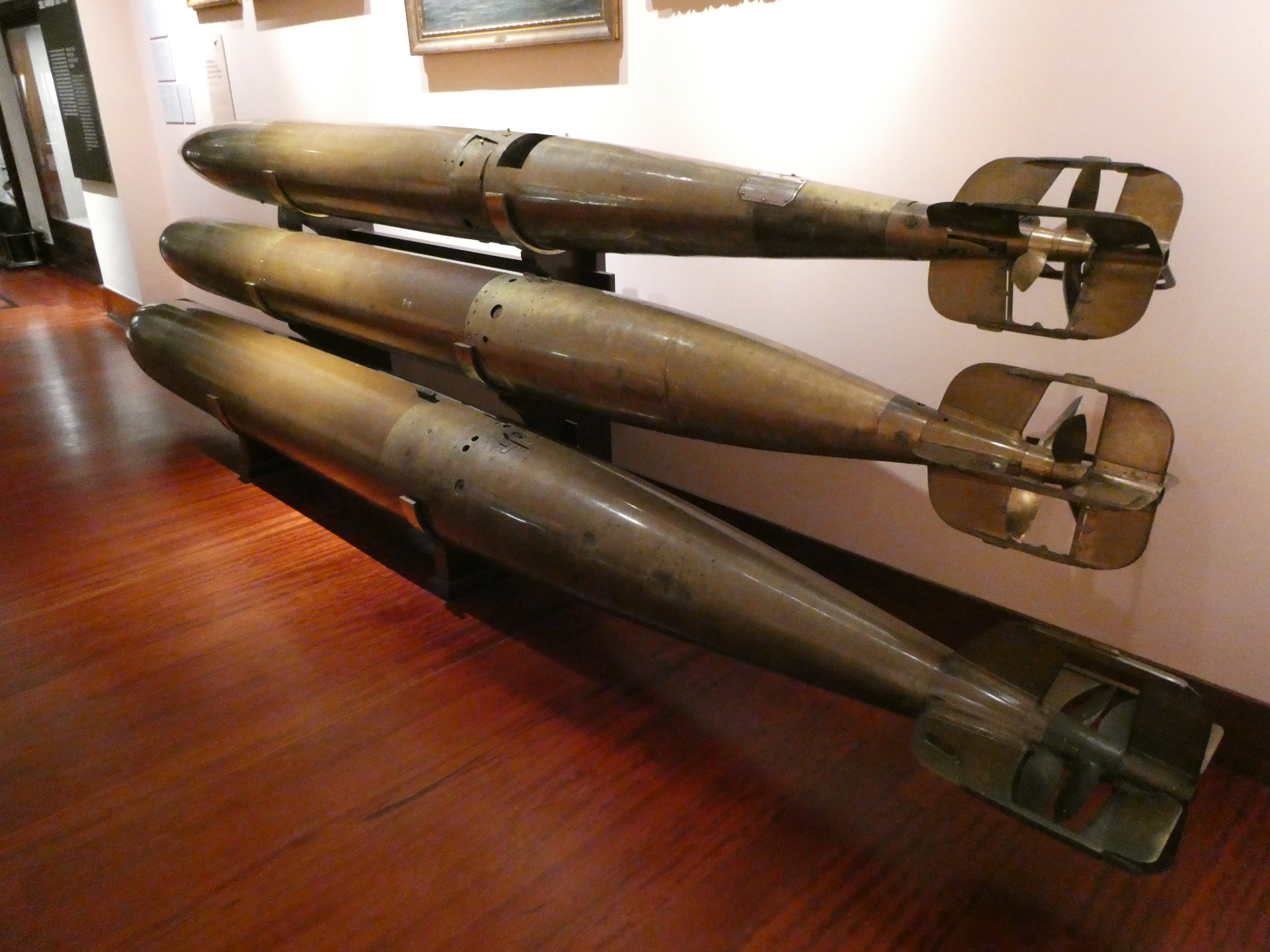
Tail section view of three versions of Schwartzkopff torpedoes, broadly similar in design to the Shu Type 84 and Shu Type 88.

Shu Type 88

- Entered service: 1888
- Propulsion: Compressed air
- Weight: 332 kg (732 lb)
- Length: 4.62 m (15.2 ft)
- Explosive charge: 57 kg (126 lb) Guncotton
- Range and speed: 400 m (0.22 nmi) at 26 kn (48 km/h), 600 m (0.32 nmi) at 24 kn (44 km/h)
- Notes: Purchased from Schwartzkopff, model of 1885. Bronze body. A total of 307 units were purchased.

During the First Sino-Japanese War, Schwartzkopff torpedoes of various models were used by both of the belligerent sides. The novel weapon proved to be sensitive to deficient maintenance practices. At the Battle of the Yalu River, the Chinese launched multiple torpedo salvos at the ironclad Hiei as it executed a flanking maneuver. Torpedoes could be seen breaching the waves, indicative of a failure of the depth-keeping mechanism due to poor maintenance. This greatly reduced both the accuracy and propulsive endurance of the weapons, and none managed to hit the vessel. A second instance during the same battle was the Chinese torpedo attack against the Saikyo Maru, with the torpedo's depth-keeping mechanism likewise failing, and the weapon witnessed passing harmlessly below the vessel's keel. Later in the war, during the Battle of Weihaiwei, the Japanese attacked with Schwartzkopff torpedoes of their own, launched from torpedo boats, targeting Chinese vessels harbored in the naval base at the Shangdong peninsula. The torpedoes functioned reliably and proved to be decisive, sinking multiple vessels and sending the rest of the defending fleet into disarray.

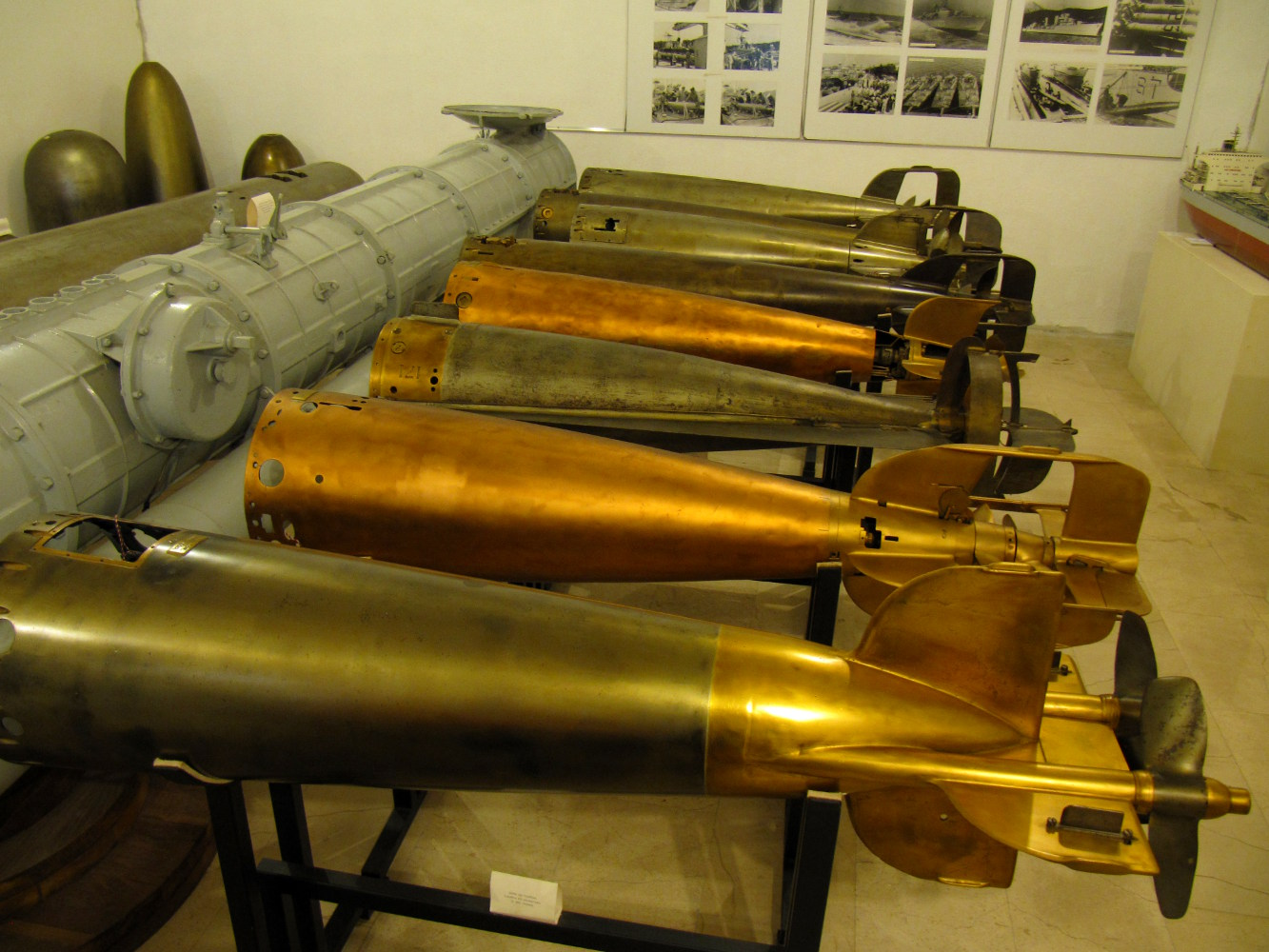
Various bronze and brass tail sections of late 19th century Whitehead torpedoes on display at the Croatian Maritime Museum. Whitehead was the supplier for the Ho torpedo series.

Ho Type 26

- Entered service: 1893
- Propulsion: Compressed air
- Weight: 332 kg (732 lb)
- Length: 4.46 m (14.6 ft)
- Explosive charge: 49 kg (108 lb) Guncotton or Lyddite equivalent
- Range and speed: 660 m (0.36 nmi) at 26 kn (48 km/h), 800 m (0.43 nmi) at 22 kn (41 km/h)
- Notes: Purchased from Whitehead, Fiume Mark IV model of 1885, with incremental improvements. Steel body, phosphor bronze internals. A total of 100 units were purchased. The best torpedo of the Sino-Japanese War.

Ho Type 30

- Entered service: 1897
- Propulsion: Compressed air
- Weight: 338 kg (745 lb)
- Length: 4.56 m (15.0 ft)
- Explosive charge: 52 kg (115 lb) Shimose
- Range and speed: 600 m (0.32 nmi) at 30 kn (56 km/h), 800 m (0.43 nmi) at 22 kn (41 km/h), 2,500 m (1.3 nmi) at 12 kn (22 km/h)
- Notes: Purchased from Whitehead, Fiume Mark V model of 1893, upgraded after 1895. Featured gyroscopic guidance using the Obry gyroscope after the 1895 retrofit. A total of 50 units were purchased. Domestic production was set up at the Kure Naval Arsenal. A 45 cm version of this torpedo was also procured.

Ho Type 32

- Entered service: 1899
- Propulsion: Compressed air
- Weight: 338 kg (745 lb)
- Length: 4.56 m (15.0 ft)
- Explosive charge: 50 kg (110 lb) Shimose
- Range and speed: 600 m (0.32 nmi) at 30 kn (56 km/h), 800 m (0.43 nmi) at 24 kn (44 km/h), 2,500 m (1.3 nmi) at 15 kn (28 km/h)
- Notes: Purchased from Whitehead, Fiume Mark V model of 1895. Featured gyroscopic guidance using the Obry gyroscope. A total of 76 units were purchased. Domestic production was set up at the Kure Naval Arsenal. A 45 cm version of this torpedo was also procured.

Yokosuka Naval Arsenal Aerial Torpedo Prototype

The first ever Japanese attempt at an aerial torpedo, constructed as a prototype in 1916. A 14-inch Ho Type 32, which had been shortened and reinforced by the Yokosuka Naval Arsenal. Designed as part of a project for an experimental float plane torpedo bomber, the Yokosho Twin-Engine, created in 1916 by Chikuhei Nakajima. The design did not result in a torpedo bomber, though it did contribute to the Yokosho Ro-go Ko-gata reconnaissance float plane. Japan would soon thereafter, in 1922, develop the unsuccessful 1MT1N torpedo bomber, followed by the successful B1M in 1923. Both of these would be designed to carry dedicated 45 cm aerial torpedoes.

- Prototype Date: 1916
- Propulsion: Compressed air
- Weight: 350 kg (770 lb)
- Length: Unknown, approximately 4.2 m (14 ft)
- Range and speed: 500–600 m (0.27–0.32 nmi) at 30 kn (56 km/h)
- Max airdrop speed: Approximately 60 kn (110 km/h)
- Notes: Warhead was likely removed; the range and speed suggest that the propulsion system and air flask were untouched.

In 1921, at the newly-constructed Kasumigaura Air Field near Tokyo, an intensive training program took place with the ultimate goal of developing a functional aerial torpedo, involving the assistance of foreign instructors. Torpedo bombing tests were carried out under the supervision of 29 British instructors, using the Sopwith Cuckoo and Blackburn Swift aircraft, as well as the Supermarine Channel and Felixstowe F5 flying boats. Japan would subsequently purchase a group of 7 Blackburn Swift aircraft, designated the Swift Mark II. Also purchased were a group of 3 Supermarine Channels. The Felixstowe F5 would later be license-built in Japan. During this time period, Britain utilized the 18-inch Mark VII and Mark VIII torpedoes for aerial launch, though it is unknown if live examples were furnished for the training program. Dummy torpedoes may have been used, based on the Type 38 - the last of the cold-runner compressed air designs.

Torpedo work at the Kasumigaura air field continued until January 1923, which is when a final torpedo design without an explosive payload was tested on the new Mitsubishi B1M bomber, and finally implemented with a warhead the same year. The torpedo thus used was a modification of the Type 44, which lasted until 1931, whereupon it was gradually replaced with prototypes of the Type 91 Mod 1, and retired from the aerial torpedo role after 1933.

== Type 30 ==
Main article: 18-inch Fiume Mark I Long

18-inch Fiume Mark I Long torpedo of 1892, purchased and slightly modified by the Japanese. The original wet guncotton filler was replaced with stabilized picric acid, transitioning to the Shimose system in later units. Procured in 1896, and in service in 1897, immediately after the First Sino-Japanese War. The Whitehead factory designation was W100/450 x 5, with deliveries spanning from 1896 to 1899. This was the first 45 cm torpedo in Japanese service. Used on surface ships.

Specifications:

- Entered service: 1897
- Propulsion: Compressed air
- Weight: 532 kg (1,173 lb)
- Length: 4.95 m (16.2 ft)
- Explosive charge: 100 kg (220 lb) Lyddite equivalent or Shimose
- Range and speed: 600 m (0.32 nmi) at 29 kn (54 km/h), 1,000 m (0.54 nmi) at 27 kn (50 km/h)

== Type 32 ==
Main article: 18-inch Fiume Mark II

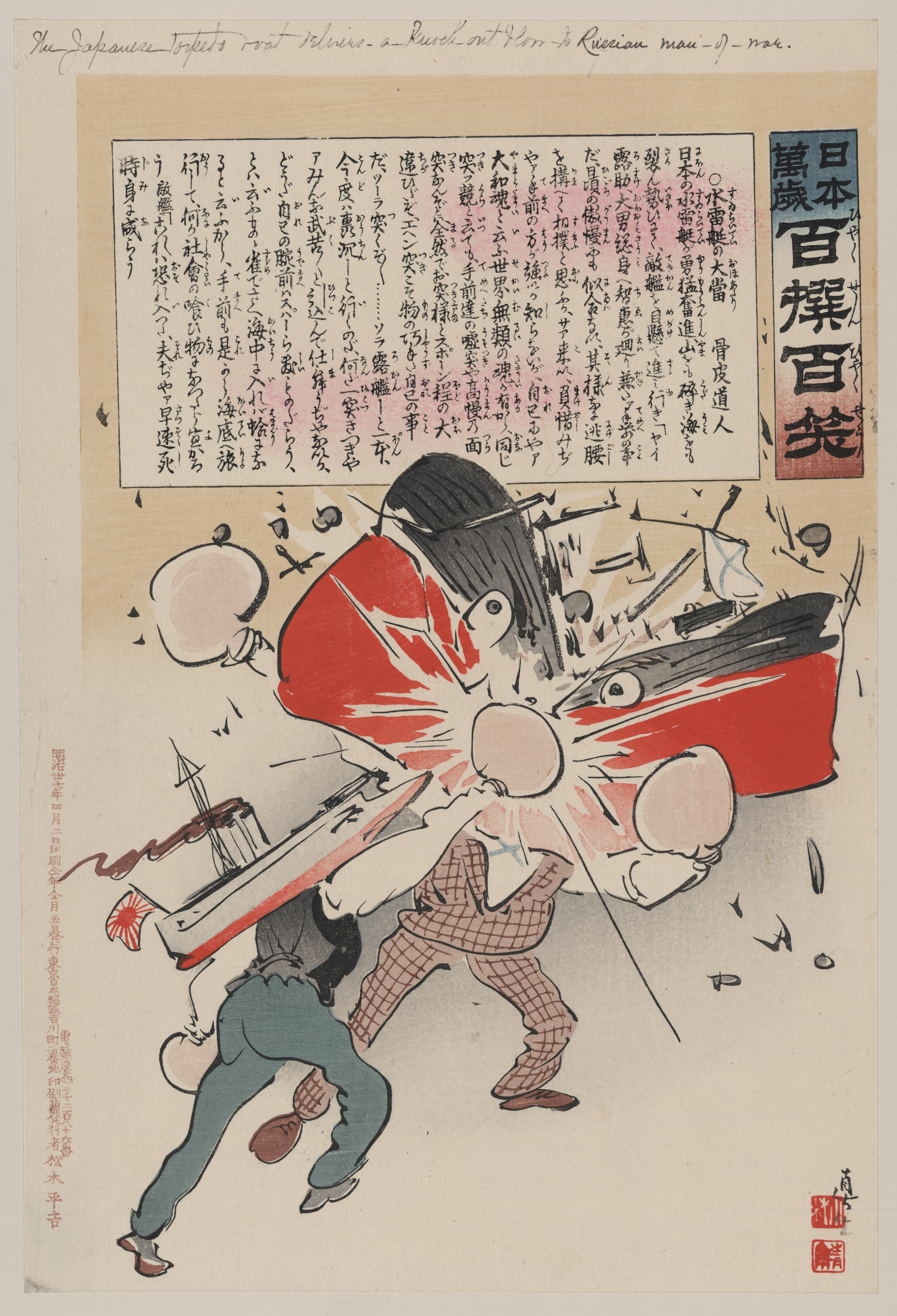
"The Japanese Torpedo Boat delivers a knock-out blow to Russian Man-of-War". A cartoon commemorating the Battle of Port Arthur, by Kobayashi Kiyochika.

18-inch Fiume Mark II torpedo of 1893, fitted with the Obry gyrocompass of the contemporary 14-inch Fiume Mark III, purchased and slightly modified by the Japanese. The original wet guncotton filler was replaced with stabilized picric acid, transitioning to the Shimose system in later units. Procured in 1898, in service in 1899. The first Japanese torpedo to feature gyroscope guidance. Used on surface ships.

The Type 32 was used notably during the First Battle of Port Arthur in February 1904. A squadron of Akatsuki, Ikazuchi, Murakumo, and Shirakumo-class destroyers (Akatsuki, Asashio, Ikazuchi, Inazuma, Kasumi, Oboro, Sazanami, Shinonome, Shirakumo, Usugumo) used the cover of darkness and ambushed the Russian navy in Port Arthur, attacking the much heavier warships anchored in port with said torpedoes. Initial torpedoes were launched at a range of approximately 1,000 yd (910 m), on the high speed setting (<29 knots), and subsequent launches were from as close as 600 yd (550 m). Despite only three of sixteen torpedoes successfully hitting their targets due to a combination of factors including anti-torpedo nets in the harbor, the result was appreciable: the battleships Tsesarevich and Retvizan, the heaviest warships in the Far East Fleet, were heavily damaged and put out of commission for weeks; while the protected cruiser Pallada suffered an explosion and fire, flooded, and sank in shallow water. The capabilities of torpedoes against far heavier adversaries would later affect subsequent Japanese naval doctrine and weapon development.

Specifications:

- Entered service: 1899
- Propulsion: Compressed air
- Weight: 541 kg (1,193 lb)
- Length: 4.95 m (16.2 ft)
- Explosive charge: 90 kg (200 lb) Lyddite equivalent or Shimose
- Range and speed: 1,000 m (0.54 nmi) at 28 kn (52 km/h), 3,000 m (1.6 nmi) at 15 kn (28 km/h)

== Type 34 ==
Main article: 18-inch Fiume Mark I Short

18-inch Fiume Mark I Short torpedo of 1893 with gyroscopic guidance, purchased in part and significantly modified by the Japanese. The Whitehead factory designation was W55/450 x 3.68, with initial deliveries spanning from 1893 to 1897. The units purchased by the Japanese were delivered in 1896, and initially modified to a length of 6.45 meters, titled Sample Coast Defense Torpedo in official records. Other prototypes of coastal defense torpedoes were a 6.4 m and a 7.95 m unit, which were not produced. The final version of the torpedo body was extended to an overall length of 6.5 meters, though this proved to be too fragile for the rough handling that torpedoes normally endured, and the length was not exceeded in subsequent developments of 45 cm torpedoes. The warhead was replaced with the same one used on the Type 32, entirely using Shimose filler. In service in 1901. Used on land emplacements for strait defense.

Specifications:

- Entered service: 1901
- Propulsion: Compressed air
- Weight: 895 kg (1,973 lb)
- Length: 6.50 m (21.3 ft)
- Explosive charge: 90 kg (200 lb) Shimose
- Range and speed: 2,000 m (1.1 nmi) at 27 kn (50 km/h), 3,500 m (1.9 nmi) at 20 kn (37 km/h)

== Type 37 ==
Designed 1904, in service 1904. A close derivative of a Whitehead design, the Ho Type 32 (itself a derivative of the 18-inch Fiume Mark II), with numerous modifications. The Type 37 was the first Japanese torpedo to be manufactured indigenously at the Kure Naval Arsenal. Used on surface ships.

Specifications:

- Entered service: 1904
- Propulsion: Compressed air
- Weight: 541 kg (1,193 lb)
- Length: 4.95 m (16.2 ft)
- Explosive charge: 90 kg (200 lb) Shimose
- Range and speed: 1,000 m (0.54 nmi) at 28 kn (52 km/h), 3,000 m (1.6 nmi) at 15 kn (28 km/h)

== Type 38 ==
Designed 1904, in service 1905. Three variants existed - Type 38 No.1, Type 38 No.2 "A", and Type 38 No.2 "B". The Type 38 was a Japanese derivative of a Whitehead design (18-inch Fiume Mark III torpedo of 1904), with parts and assemblies sourced from Whitehead. Variants 2A and 2B utilized a four-cylinder radial engine, and 2B was further advanced by switching it to dry heater propulsion, significantly increasing speed. Dry heater propulsion had been introduced the same year, in 1905, which meant that the Type 38 No.2B was cutting-edge technology at the time of its introduction. Used on surface ships.

Specifications:

Type 38 No.1

- Entered service: 1905
- Propulsion: Compressed air
- Weight: 617 kg (1,360 lb)
- Length: 5.15 m (16.9 ft)
- Explosive charge: 100 kg (220 lb) Shimose
- Range and speed: 1,000 m (0.54 nmi) at 27 kn (50 km/h), 2,000 m (1.1 nmi) at 24 kn (44 km/h), 3,000 m (1.6 nmi) at 20 kn (37 km/h)

Type 38 No.2A

- Entered service: 1905
- Propulsion: Compressed air
- Weight: 640 kg (1,410 lb)
- Length: 5.09 m (16.7 ft)
- Explosive charge: 95 kg (209 lb) Shimose
- Range and speed: 1,000 m (0.54 nmi) at 31.5 kn (58.3 km/h), 2,000 m (1.1 nmi) at 26 kn (48 km/h), 3,000 m (1.6 nmi) at 20.3 kn (37.6 km/h)

Type 38 No.2B

- Entered service: 1905
- Propulsion: Dry heater
- Weight: 663 kg (1,462 lb)
- Length: 5.19 m (17.0 ft)
- Explosive charge: 95 kg (209 lb) Shimose
- Range and speed: 1,000 m (0.54 nmi) at 40 kn (74 km/h), 2,000 m (1.1 nmi) at 32 kn (59 km/h), 3,000 m (1.6 nmi) at 23 kn (43 km/h)

== Type 42 ==
Main article: 18-inch RGF Mark V

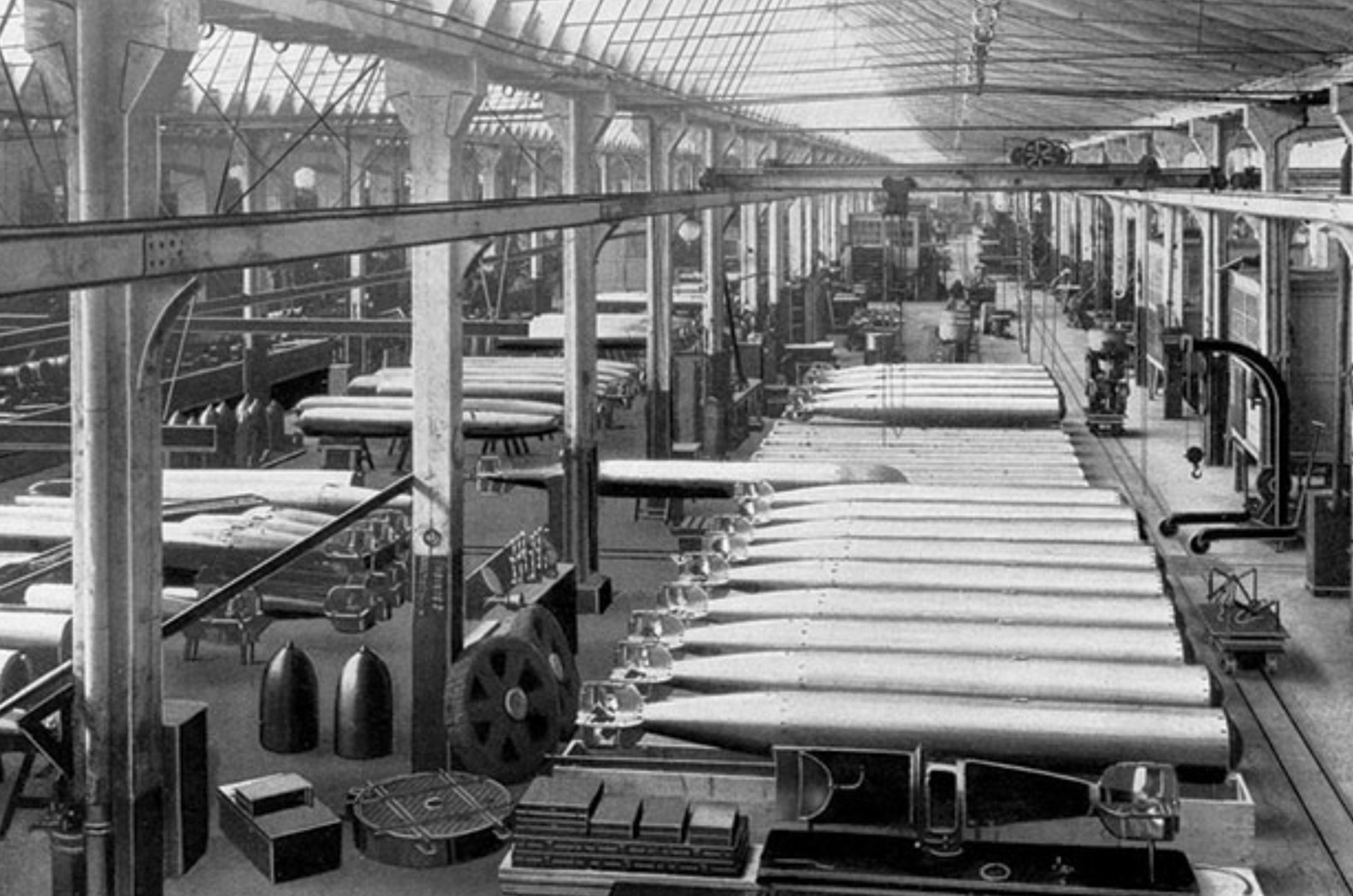
Manufacture of the Fiume Mark V, an analogous design, at the Whitehead Torpedo Works in 1915.

Designed 1908, in service 1909. The last Japanese torpedo to be purchased from Whitehead, the 18-inch RGF Mark V manufactured at the Whitehead factory in Weymouth, upgraded with dry heater propulsion. As with other contemporary examples, the Shimose warheads were of Japanese origin. Used on surface ships.

Specifications:

- Entered service: 1909
- Propulsion: Dry heater
- Weight: 660 kg (1,460 lb)
- Length: 5.15 m (16.9 ft)
- Explosive charge: 95 kg (209 lb) Shimose
- Range and speed: 1,000 m (0.54 nmi) at 40 kn (74 km/h), 5,000 m (2.7 nmi) at 22 kn (41 km/h)

== Type 43 ==
Designed 1909, in service 1910. Manufactured wholly in Japan using plans furnished by Whitehead (18-inch RGF Mark V), with slight local variations. Used on surface ships, such as the Kawachi-class battleship.

Specifications:

- Entered service: 1910
- Propulsion: Dry heater
- Weight: 663 kg (1,462 lb)
- Length: 5.19 m (17.0 ft)
- Explosive charge: 95 kg (209 lb) Shimose
- Range and speed: 5,000 m (2.7 nmi) at 26 kn (48 km/h)

== Type 44 18-inch ==
Based upon plans supplied by Whitehead (18-inch RGF Mark V) and the practical experience garnered from employment of the Type 43. Designed 1910, in service 1911. The Type 44 torpedo series existed in both 18-inch and 21-inch calibers, each having a No.1 and a No.2 variant developed. Originally designed as improved torpedoes for the Eight-Eight Fleet program. Used on surface ships and submarines equipped with 45 cm tubes, such as versions of the L and Kaichu types. The Type 44 No.2 Mod 1 was an aerial torpedo variant used on aircraft, such as the B1M, B2M, and B3Y biplane torpedo bombers. Prototype testing commenced in 1923 and the weapon was approved for service in 1924, for use on Japan's first aircraft carrier, the Hosho. The first ever domestically-designed Japanese carrier-borne torpedo bomber, the 1MT1N, was also slated to carry a variant of the Type 44 torpedo, but in practice was unable to take off from the carrier deck while carrying one. After testing of the Type 91 torpedo commenced in 1931, the aerial variant of the Type 44 was deemed obsolescent. During the Second World War, the Type 44 was mostly relegated to old ships, coastal defense craft, and torpedo boats. The older Shimose filler was replaced with Type 97 or Type 98 explosive in any remaining units of the older versions, and the aerial torpedo variant had also been assigned to surface ships.

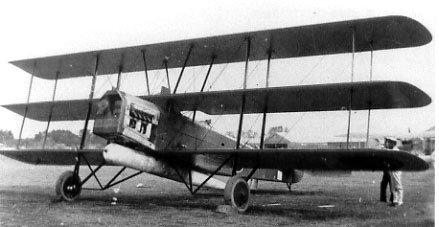
A Mitsubishi 1MT1N torpedo bomber with a Mark 44 No.2 Mod 1 torpedo attached, during prototype testing in 1923 or 1924.

Specifications:

Type 44 No.1 18-inch

- Entered service: 1911
- Propulsion: Wet heater
- Weight: 719 kg (1,585 lb)
- Length: 5.39 m (17.7 ft)
- Explosive charge: 110 kg (240 lb) Shimose
- Range and speed: 4,000 m (2.2 nmi) at 36 kn (67 km/h)

Type 44 No.2 18-inch

- Entered service: 1911
- Propulsion: Wet heater
- Weight: 750 kg (1,650 lb)
- Length: 5.39 m (17.7 ft)
- Explosive charge: 110 kg (240 lb) Shimose
- Range and speed: 4,000 m (2.2 nmi) at 36 kn (67 km/h), 8,000 m (4.3 nmi) at 26 kn (48 km/h)

Type 44 No.2 Mod 1

- Entered service: 1924
- Propulsion: Wet heater
- Weight: 830 kg (1,830 lb)
- Length: 5.55 m (18.2 ft)
- Explosive charge: 110 kg (240 lb) Shimose, later replaced by Type 97
- Range and speed: 3,900 m (2.1 nmi) at 36 kn (67 km/h)
- Max airdrop speed: 110 kn (200 km/h)
- Note: Deemed obsolete after 1931, used in a training role. Remaining units were gradually converted for use by ships after the onset of the Second Sino-Japanese War.

Type 44 Late

- Entered service: Unknown, likely 1937~1941
- Propulsion: Wet heater
- Weight: 900 kg (2,000 lb)
- Length: 5.77 m (18.9 ft)
- Explosive charge: 208 kg (459 lb) Shimose, Type 97 or Type 98
- Range and speed: 3,000 m (1.6 nmi) at 35 kn (65 km/h), 7,000 m (3.8 nmi) at 26 kn (48 km/h)
- Note: Retrofitted older torpedoes with non-standard warhead fillers, refurbished for use by auxiliary surface vessels during WWII. Aerial torpedo units converted for this role were known to retain their old markings.

== Type 91 ==
Main article: Type 91 torpedo (ja)

Enormously significant torpedo of the Second World War, capable of much higher drop speeds than American and British contemporaries. In December of 1941, the Type 91 was by far the best aerial torpedo in the world. Beginning in 1936, breakaway wooden stabilizers were introduced, which prevented the weapon from diving too deep upon water entry and improved initial angular accuracy. Following a breakthrough development program which commenced in 1939, Mod 2 of 1941 introduced advanced gyroscope-guided anti-roll control which used a three-term feedback system, smoothly stabilizing the weapon without resorting to rapid "seeking" behavior of the control vanes. Predominantly used on aircraft; also saw use on surface ships.

Specifications:

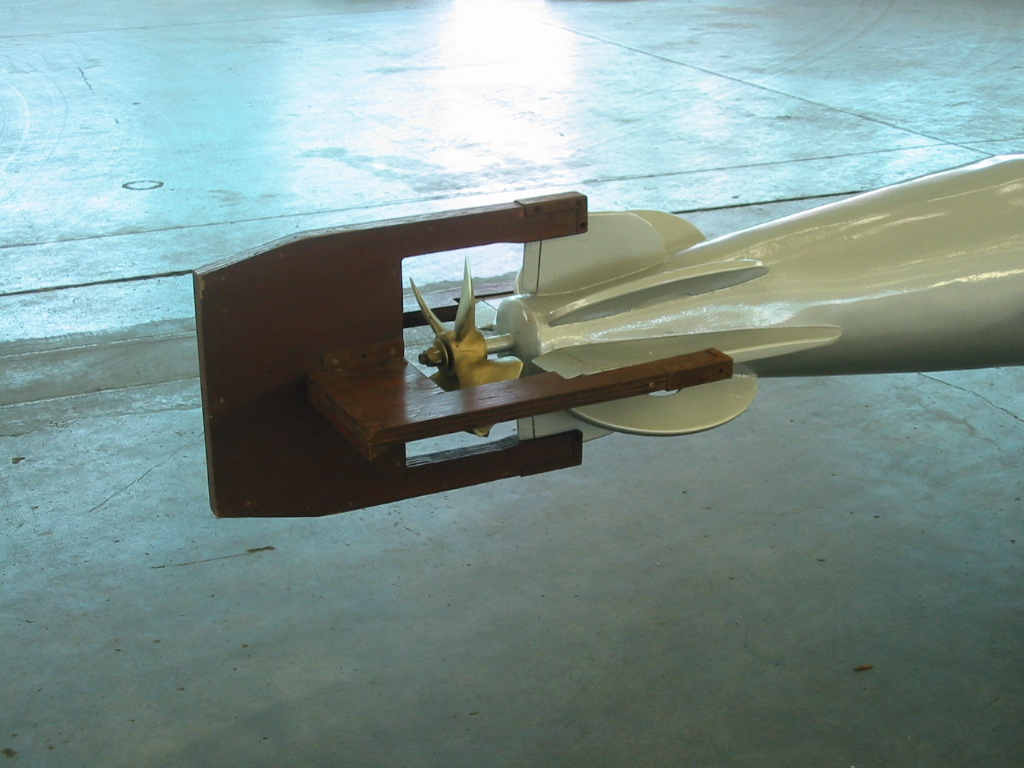
Type 91 Mod 1 torpedo tail section, showing the breakaway "kyoban" wooden tail extension, which stabilized the torpedo after hitting the water.

Type 91 Mod 1

- Entered service: 1933
- Weight: 784 kg (1,728 lb)
- Length: 5.27 m (17.3 ft)
- Explosive charge: 150 kg (330 lb) Type 97
- Range and speed: 2,000 m (1.1 nmi) at 41–43 kn (76–80 km/h)
- Max airdrop speed: 260 kn (480 km/h)
- Note: Kyoban wooden stabilizer introduced as a result of field testing, in 1936.

Type 91 Mod 2

- Entered service: 1941
- Weight: 935 kg (2,061 lb)
- Length: 5.48 m (18.0 ft)
- Explosive charge: 205 kg (452 lb) Type 97
- Range and speed: 2,000 m (1.1 nmi) at 41–43 kn (76–80 km/h)
- Max airdrop speed: 260 kn (480 km/h)
- Note: Testing commenced 1939. Automated anti-roll mechanism introduced 1941. Erroneously referred to as Type 92 in at least one USN report.

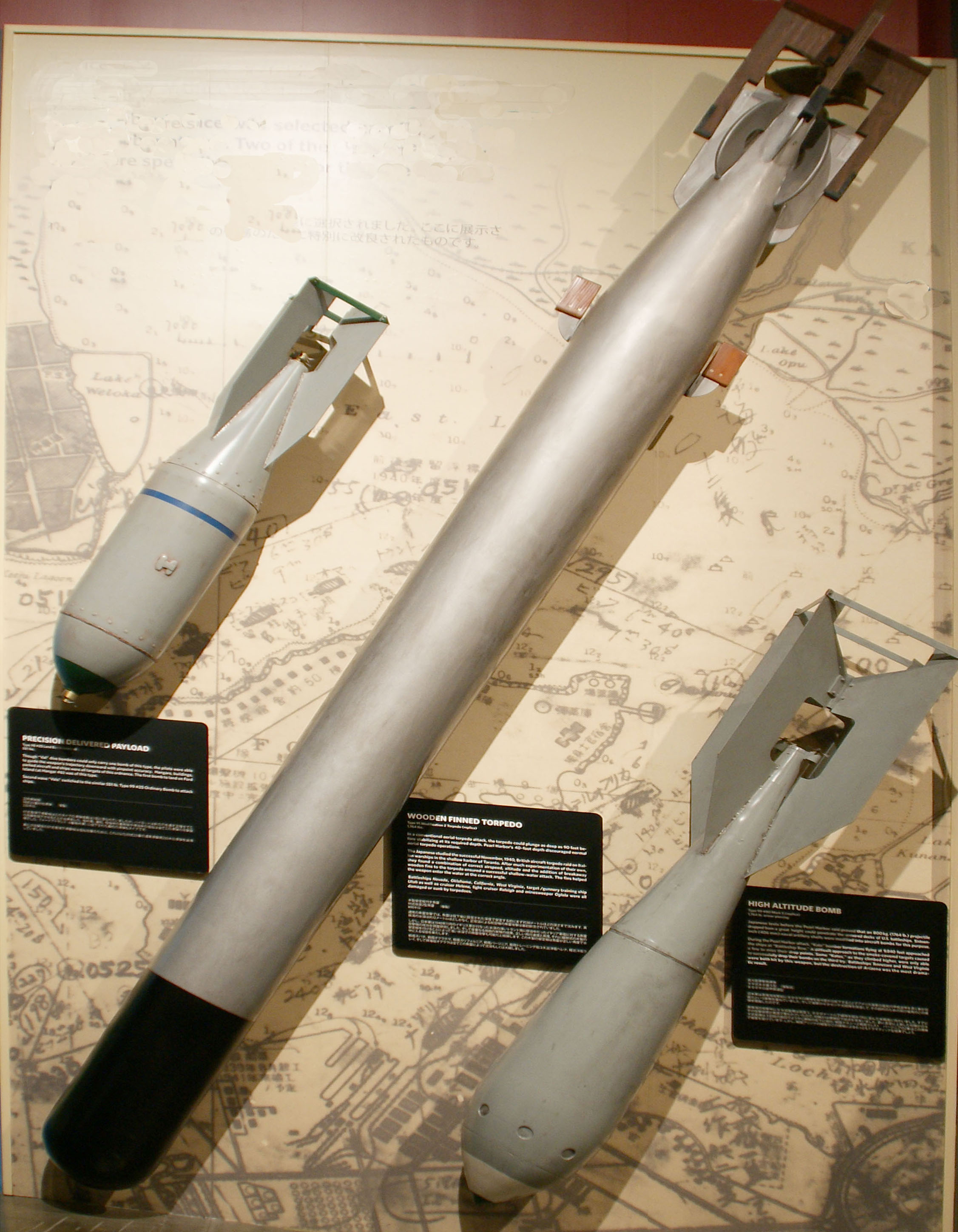
Japanese ordnance used in the attack on Pearl Harbor, on display at the Pacific Aviation Museum. The Type 91 Mod 2 is shown in the center.

Type 91 Mod 3

- Entered service: 1942
- Weight: 849 kg (1,872 lb)
- Length: 5.27 m (17.3 ft)
- Explosive charge: 240 kg (530 lb) Type 97
- Range and speed: 2,000 m (1.1 nmi) at 41–43 kn (76–80 km/h)
- Max airdrop speed: 260 kn (480 km/h)

Type 91 Mod 3 Improved

- Entered service: 1943
- Weight: 857 kg (1,889 lb)
- Length: 5.27 m (17.3 ft)
- Explosive charge: 240 kg (530 lb) Type 97
- Range and speed: 2,000 m (1.1 nmi) at 41–43 kn (76–80 km/h)
- Max airdrop speed: 300 kn (560 km/h)

Type 91 Mod 3 Strong

- Entered service: 1943
- Weight: 857 kg (1,889 lb)
- Length: 5.27 m (17.3 ft)
- Explosive charge: 240 kg (530 lb) Type 97
- Range and speed: 1,500 m (0.81 nmi) at 41–43 kn (76–80 km/h)
- Max airdrop speed: 350 kn (650 km/h)

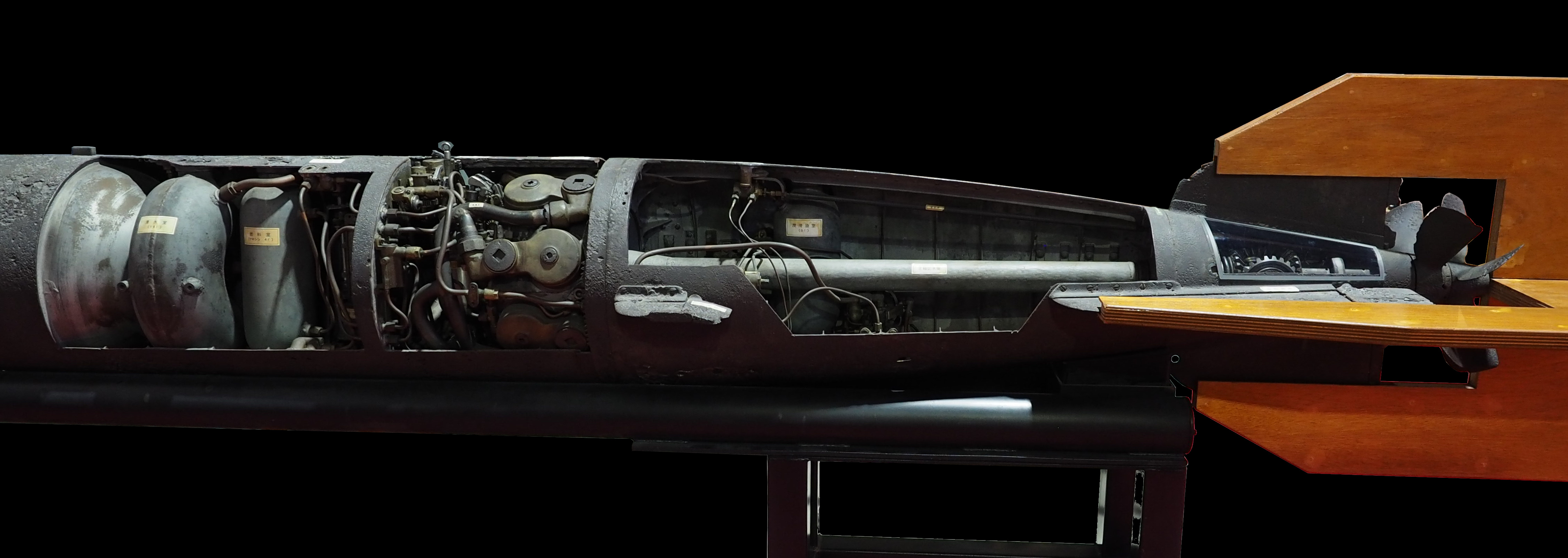
Afterbody section of a Type 91 torpedo with panels removed, showing the guidance mechanism. Static display at the Mitsubishi Heavy Industries Nagasaki Shipyard Museum (ja), Akunoramachi district, Nagasaki.

Type 91 Mod 4 Strong

- Entered service: 1944
- Weight: 921 kg (2,030 lb)
- Length: 5.27 m (17.3 ft)
- Explosive charge: 308 kg (679 lb) Type 97
- Range and speed: 1,500 m (0.81 nmi) at 41–43 kn (76–80 km/h)
- Max airdrop speed: 350 kn (650 km/h)

Type 91 Mod 7 Strong

- Entered service: 1944
- Weight: 1,052 kg (2,319 lb)
- Length: 5.71 m (18.7 ft)
- Explosive charge: 420 kg (930 lb) Type 97
- Range and speed: 1,500 m (0.81 nmi) at 40–42 kn (74–78 km/h)
- Max airdrop speed: 350 kn (650 km/h)

QR Project Spiraling Torpedo

- Prototype date: 1945
- Weight: 935 kg (2,061 lb)
- Length: 5.48 m (18.0 ft)
- Explosive charge: 205 kg (452 lb) Type 97
- Range and speed: 3,700 m (2.0 nmi) at 26 kn (48 km/h)
- Maximum depth: Approximately 100 m (330 ft)
- Max airdrop speed: 260 kn (480 km/h)
- Note: Anti-submarine circling torpedo, given two sequential project designations "Q" and "R". A Type 91 Mod 2 with modest modifications, causing it to move in a spiral while descending. Spiral diameter was approximately 275 meters with an initial descent rate of 18 meters per cycle, gradually increasing to 32 meters per cycle. A total of about 50 units were made, with units reaching field deployment. Scarcity of materials and the war situation hindered mass manufacture and deployment. Aside from air delivery, could also be launched from 45 cm surface launch tubes.

== Type 94 Mod 2 ==
Development commenced 1934, entered service 1939. Two variants existed, a Type 94 Mod 1 and a Type 94 Mod 2. Kerosene-oxygen torpedo for aircraft use. The Type 94 Mod 2 was the 45 cm variant, developed as a successor for the Mod 1. The design was a hybrid derivative of both the Type 95 and Type 91, with many parts of the propulsion system being interchangeable. The major advantage of kerosene-oxygen propulsion was long range, which was deemed unnecessary for aircraft torpedoes. Moreover, the handling of pure oxygen was troublesome, and the design was more complex and expensive than that of the Type 91. The design was re-engineered in 1941 in preparation for war. Approximately 100-120 units were manufactured at Yokosuka and Nagasaki arsenals, with mass production taking place from 1941 to 1942. Production halted in favor of allocating production capacity to the Type 91.

Specifications:

- Entered service: 1939
- Propulsion: Wet heater (kerosene-oxygen)
- Weight: 827 kg (1,823 lb)
- Length: 5.28 m (17.3 ft)
- Explosive charge: 210 kg (460 lb) Type 97
- Range and speed: 3,000 m (1.6 nmi) at 48 kn (89 km/h)
- Max airdrop speed: 170 kn (310 km/h)
- Notes: Very few units manufactured before 1941; re-engineered in that year for mass production. The original version from 1939 used the Type 91 Mod 1 warhead - 150 kg (330 lb) Type 97.

== Type 95 ==
Designed 1935, entered service the same year. Kerosene-air torpedo for aircraft use. Unrelated to the 53 cm Type 95, the 45 cm Type 95 was an aerial torpedo which served between 1935 and 1941, which is when it became surpassed by the Type 91 Mod 2. After its obsolescence, remaining units were assigned to the submarine force, particularly midget submarines. Due to scant information during the war, the Type 95 contributed to the "New Kure" torpedo rumors reported by the United States Bureau of Ordnance.

Specifications:

- Entered service: 1935
- Propulsion: Wet heater (kerosene-air)
- Weight: 848 kg (1,870 lb)
- Length: 5.36 m (17.6 ft)
- Explosive charge: 200 kg (440 lb) Type 97
- Range and speed: 2,000 m (1.1 nmi) at 42 kn (78 km/h)
- Max airdrop speed: 190 kn (350 km/h)
- Notes: Reported as "New Kure" by US intelligence.

== Type 97 ==
Main article: Type 97 torpedo

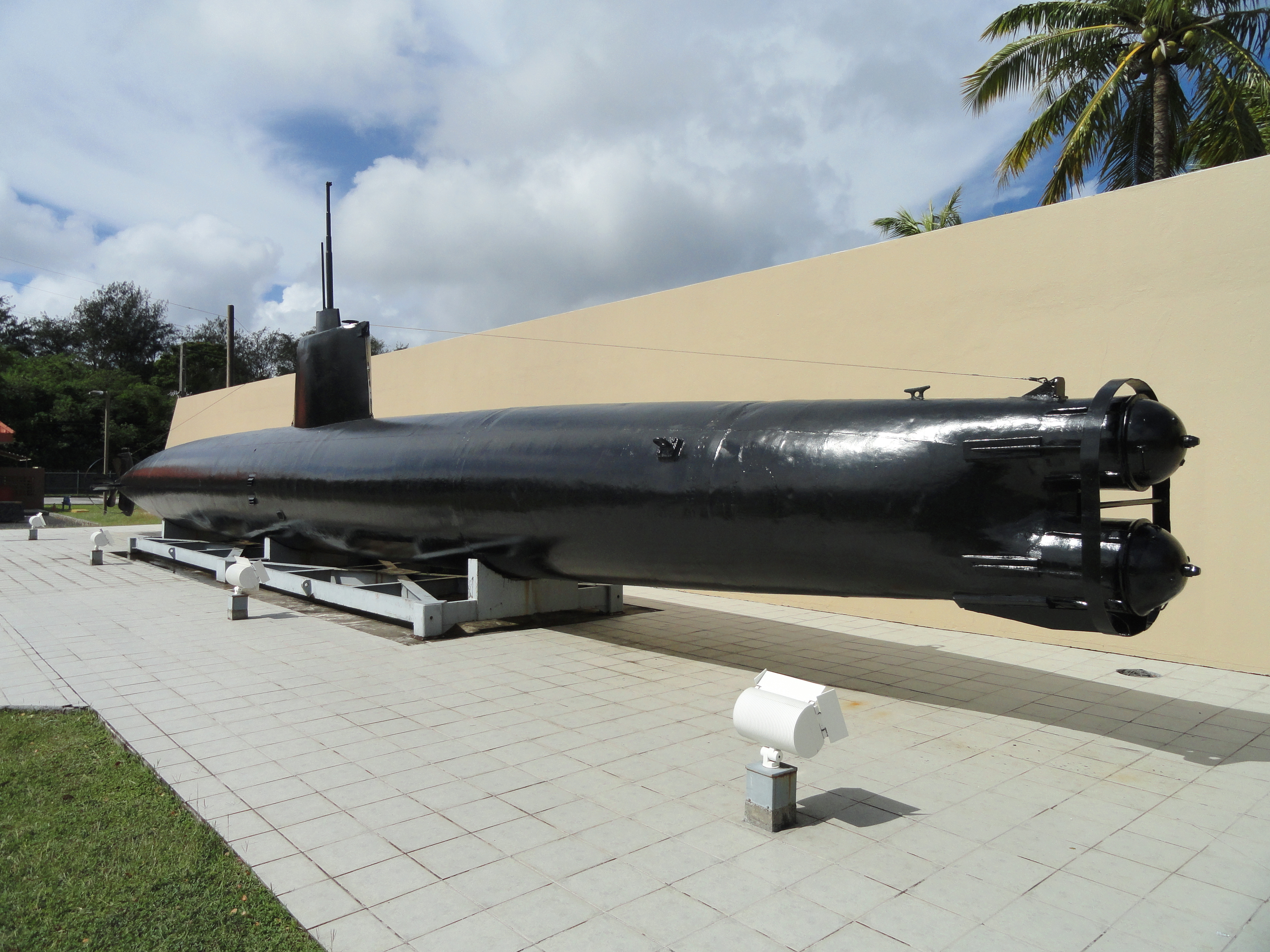
A Type C Ko-Hyoteki midget submarine displayed at the War in the Pacific National Historical Park. Its two 45 cm torpedo tubes are prominently visible.

Designed 1937, in service 1939. Downscaled modification of the 61 cm Type 93 and 53 cm Type 95 torpedoes. Used on midget submarines, primarily the Ko-Hyoteki class. The Type 97 was prominently used during the Attack on Pearl Harbor. Approximately 100 units were produced; field testing revealed reliability problems with the compressed oxygen vessel. Further work resulted in the improved Type 98.

Specifications:

- Entered service: 1939
- Propulsion: Wet heater (kerosene-oxygen)
- Weight: 980 kg (2,160 lb)
- Length: 5.60 m (18.4 ft)
- Explosive charge: 350 kg (770 lb) Type 97
- Range and speed: 5,500 m (3.0 nmi) at 44–46 kn (81–85 km/h)

== Type 98 ==
Main article: Type 97 torpedo

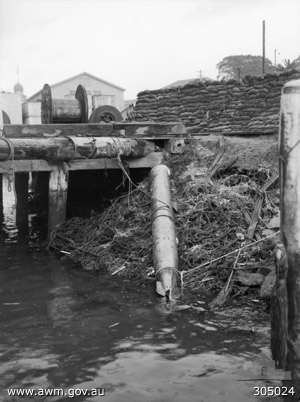
An unexploded Type 98 torpedo discovered following the attack on Sydney Harbor in 1942.

Design work commenced 1938, entered trials 1941, in service 1942. Redesigned version of the Type 97 torpedo, using 38% oxygen instead of pure oxygen, to reduce starting problems. Consequently also referred to as the Type 97 Special. Other modifications simplified the design and reduced cost, such as elimination of the "first air vessel" - a separate compressed air tank intended to spin up the engine before pure oxygen would've been supplied in the Type 97, and elimination of another compressed air tank which operated the torpedo's control surfaces - instead tapping enriched air from the main tank. Designated the Type 98 due to being a sequential development of the Type 97, just as the 53 cm Type 96 was developed from the Type 95. Used on midget submarines, primarily the Ko-Hyoteki class. Approximately 130 units were produced, beginning in 1942. Additionally, many of the remaining Type 97 torpedoes were reworked and modified into the Type 98.

Specifications:

- Entered service: 1942
- Propulsion: Wet heater (kerosene-air, oxygen-enriched)
- Weight: 950 kg (2,090 lb)
- Length: 5.60 m (18.4 ft)
- Explosive charge: 350 kg (770 lb) Type 97
- Range and speed: 3,200 m (1.7 nmi) at 40–42 kn (74–78 km/h)

== Type 2 ==
Designed 1942, in service 1943. Modification of the Type 91 Mod 3 with a larger air vessel. Two variants existed, a Type 2 and a Type 2 Special; the latter used the smaller air vessel of the original Type 91. Used on midget submarines.

Specifications:

Type 2

- Entered service: 1943
- Weight: 1,000 kg (2,200 lb)
- Length: 5.60 m (18.4 ft)
- Explosive charge: 350 kg (770 lb) Type 97
- Range and speed: 3,000 m (1.6 nmi) at 39–41 kn (72–76 km/h)

Type 2 Special

- Entered service: 1944
- Weight: 975 kg (2,150 lb)
- Length: 5.60 m (18.4 ft)
- Explosive charge: 350 kg (770 lb) Type 97
- Range and speed: 2,000 m (1.1 nmi) at 38–40 kn (70–74 km/h)

== Type 4 ==
A branching development of the Type 91 Mod 3 which aimed to further increase drop speed, reduce cost of manufacture, and add hybrid bomb-torpedo functionality. Numerous phosphor bronze parts were replaced by steel ones, and the weapon possessed an impactor fuze in the nose assembly, which allowed the weapon to function like an aerial bomb if dropped directly onto the target. The torpedo propeller would freewheel while the weapon was airborne, functioning like a stabilizer. A total of 880 units were manufactured before the end of the war. Early prototypes of what would become the Type 4, in 1942, mixed together with reports of the 45 cm Type 95, were probably the source of the "New Kure" torpedo rumors reported by the United States Bureau of Ordnance.

Specifications:

Type 4 Mark 2

- Entered service: 1945
- Weight: 984 kg (2,169 lb)
- Length: 5.275 m (17.31 ft)
- Explosive charge: 304 kg (670 lb) Type 97
- Range and speed: 1,500 m (0.81 nmi) at 42 kn (78 km/h)
- Max airdrop speed: 400 kn (740 km/h)
- Notes: Designed 1944. Modification of the Type 91 Mod 3.

Type 4 Mark 4

- Entered service: 1945
- Weight: 1,104 kg (2,434 lb)
- Length: 5.715 m (18.75 ft)
- Explosive charge: 417 kg (919 lb) Type 97
- Range and speed: 1,500 m (0.81 nmi) at 41 kn (76 km/h)
- Max airdrop speed: 400 kn (740 km/h)
- Notes: Designed 1945. Variant with a larger warhead.

== Bomb-Torpedoes ==
A series of torpedoes which had no internal propulsion, instead relying on the inertia imparted on them by the launching aircraft. All had hybrid bomb-torpedo functionality, equipped with impact or proximity fuzes which allowed them to function like aerial bombs if dropped directly onto the target. Instead of the Type (式, shiki) designation, these were given the Model (型, kata) designation.

Model 4

Bomb-torpedo for use against surface vessels. Equipped with four movable vanes for both pitch and roll control, and a guidance system derived from that used on the Type 91 torpedo. The guidance system was operated with compressed air inside a small air flask in the weapon's body. Deemed impractical after testing, did not reach deployment.

- Diameter: 450 mm
- Weight: 500 kg (1,100 lb)
- Length: 2.965 m (9.73 ft)
- Explosive charge: 250 kg (550 lb) Type 98
- Range and speed: Dependent on inertia. Retained speed above 20 kn (37 km/h) at a range of 100 m (330 ft) after water contact
- Max airdrop speed: Unknown, tested at 300 kn (560 km/h) as a torpedo. Dive bombing speed unlimited

Model 6

Also known as Kūrai No.6, developed by the First Technical Arsenal branch at Kanazawa. Prototype only, with development spanning from April to December 1944. Anti-submarine circling torpedo for use against diving submarines and submarines at shallow depth. The weapon had delta wings with a low aspect ratio for glide functionality and underwater guidance; the body and wings were constructed from wood. After contact with the water and an initial high-speed dive, the weapon would slowly sink while moving in a circle with a diameter of approximately 60 meters. The rudder had a fixed angle of 8 degrees and the weapon had a specific gravity of 1.4. The final version was intended to be equipped with a magnetic proximity fuze. The weapon would glide through the air after being launched and was sensitive to its launch speed; in testing, it proved unstable during the glide phase, exhibiting uncontrolled rolling. The wooden wings were also unreliable, shearing off if water contact occurred at excessive speeds. During testing, the weapon was launched from a Nakajima B6N torpedo bomber.

- Diameter: 300 mm body, 360 mm fins, 752 mm wingspan
- Weight: 270 kg (600 lb)
- Length: 3.085 m (10.12 ft)
- Explosive charge: 100 kg (220 lb) Type 98
- Range and speed: 5–6 kn (9.3–11.1 km/h) while waterborne. Gravity-fed energy source while underwater; moves forward as it sinks, at a descent angle of approximately 17 degrees
- Depth: 100 m (330 ft) crush depth
- Max airdrop speed: 145 kn (269 km/h) at water contact

Model 7

Also known as Kūrai No.7, a successor model to the Kūrai No.6 which attempted to ameliorate its deficiencies. Tested beginning in January 1945. Did not reach field deployment before the end of the war. Anti-submarine circling torpedo for use against diving submarines and submarines at shallow depth. Similar to Model 6, except with a steel fuselage and tail section. The weapon would glide through the air after being launched, with a launch speed of approximately 250 knots (460 kph) and a downward angle of approximately 20 degrees. After contact with the water and an initial high-speed dive, the weapon would slowly sink while moving in a circle with a diameter of approximately 60 meters. Equipped with a magnetic proximity fuze. In testing, lateral stability while airborne continued to be poor, which was expected to be fixed with an anti-roll guidance system.

- Diameter: 300 mm body, 360 mm fins, 752 mm wingspan
- Weight: 500 kg (1,100 lb)
- Length: 3.085 m (10.12 ft)
- Explosive charge: 220 kg (490 lb) Type 98
- Range and speed: Unknown; at least as high as Model 6, higher speed due to heavier weight and greater descent angle. Gravity-fed energy source while underwater; moves forward as it sinks
- Depth: Unknown crush depth; at least as deep as Model 6
- Max airdrop speed: 220 kn (410 km/h) at water contact

Model 8

Bomb-torpedo for use against surface vessels. Developed from the Model 4. Successfully tested in 1945, did not reach field deployment before the end of the war.

- Diameter: 300 mm
- Weight: 500 kg (1,100 lb)
- Length: 3.30 m (10.8 ft)
- Explosive charge: 160 kg (350 lb) Type 98
- Range and speed: Dependent on inertia. Retained speed above 25 kn (46 km/h) at a range of 70 m (230 ft) after water contact
- Max airdrop speed: Unknown, tested at 250 kn (460 km/h) as a torpedo. Dive bombing speed unlimited

== See also ==
- Japanese 32 cm torpedo
- Japanese 53 cm torpedo
- Japanese 61 cm torpedo
- List of torpedoes
