= Aichi Type 2 =

Aichi Type 2 may refer to:

- Aichi Navy Type 2 Single-seat Reconnaissance Seaplane
- Aichi Navy Type 2 Two-seat Reconnaissance Seaplane
- Aichi Navy Type 2 Anti-Submarine and Training Flying Boat
- Aichi Navy Type 2 Transport
