= Japanese 61 cm torpedo =

Japanese weapon used by ships, submarines, and aircraft

Several 61 cm (24-inch) torpedoes have been used by the Imperial Japanese Navy, particularly during the Second World War. The size category has not been used by Japan since the end of the war.

Torpedoes of caliber larger than 21-inch are uncommon, though a number of examples can be found during the 20th century, such as the German Empire's H8 (60 cm), the British Navy Mark I (24.5-inch), and the Cold War Era Soviet 65-73 and 65-76 (65 cm). Submarines and surface ships generally used 53 cm torpedoes, whereas 61 cm torpedoes were entirely in the realm of surface launch. One exception was the M-Project aerial torpedo, which actually had a diameter of 63 cm.

With the modest increase in diameter, 61 cm torpedoes had much more internal volume. This allowed for superior propulsion systems, more propellant, and a heavier warhead. Such torpedoes approached the size of midget submarines, and the Type 93 was modified into a suicide weapon - the Kaiten, a piloted version.

Prior to 6 October 1917, imperial measurements were used. After this date, metric units were used. As such, the 18-inch torpedoes were designated as 45 cm torpedoes. Japanese torpedoes have usually conformed to the 45 cm (17.7-inch or 18-inch), the 53 cm (21-inch), and the 61 cm (24-inch) calibers.

The Japanese type designation scheme has mostly used three different approaches. Units designed prior to the end of the Second World War relied on the traditional Japanese calendar and were designated by either the regnal era year or the imperial year. In 1873, the Gregorian calendar was introduced in Japan; during the latter half of the 20th century, Japan increasingly switched to using this system, and as such, more recent torpedoes have type designations denoting Gregorian years. As an example of all three systems, a torpedo designed or accepted for service in 1980 could potentially be called either a Type 55 (Showa Era year 55), a Type 40 (Imperial Year 2640), or a Type 80 (Gregorian year 1980).

== Type 8 ==
Main article: 8th Year Type torpedo

Also referred to as the 8th Year Type in literature, referring to Taisho Era year 8 (1919). The weapon was designed by the then-recently established Imperial Japanese Navy Technical Department, which favored the regnal era naming scheme. Design work commenced in 1919 and was completed the same year; in service 1920. Used on surface ships. Two variants existed: a high-speed Type 8 No.1, and a long-range Type 8 No.2 with a slightly heavier warhead.

The 61 cm torpedo program was originally borne out of experiments during the 1910s with a goal of creating heavy coastal defense torpedoes. At the time, these did not move past the paper study phase. Concepts for these weapons focused on 61 cm (24-inch) and 70 cm (27.5-inch) calibers. In the aftermath of the Russo-Japanese War, Japan pursued a tentative Eight-Eight Program, which stipulated the necessity for eight modern battleships of at least 20,000 tons displacement and eight modern battlecruisers of at least 18,000 tons displacement. These ships would be armed with new, increasingly powerful armaments, including torpedoes of 21-inch caliber, as opposed to the 18-inch standard common during the war. The torpedoes designed for this program were the Type 6, soon to be followed by the 61 cm (24-inch) Type 8. Alongside the design of the Type 6, the decision was made to switch to metric units for all present and future torpedo programs. In 1922, the Washington Naval Treaty was signed, and the large new torpedoes were reassigned to new designs of cruisers and destroyers. The Furutaka, Myōkō, and Aoba classes were designed from the ground-up with the new Type 8 torpedoes in mind. Owing in part to the new torpedoes, the Myōkō class was considered the heaviest-armed of any cruiser in the world at the time. During the Second World War, the Type 8 had been obsolescent, but continued to be used on older vessels such as the Nagara class of cruisers. In the course of the war, the Type 8 was retrofitted and modified. The older Shimose filler was replaced with Type 97 explosive in any remaining units of the older versions.

Specifications:

Type 8 No.1

- Entered service: 1920
- Propulsion: Wet heater
- Weight: 2,215 kg (4,883 lb)
- Length: 8.415 m (27.61 ft)
- Explosive charge: 300 kg (660 lb) Shimose
- Range and speed: 6,200 m (3.3 nmi) at 43 kn (80 km/h), 10,000 m (5.4 nmi) at 37 kn (69 km/h)

Type 8 No.2

- Entered service: 1920
- Propulsion: Wet heater
- Weight: 2,362 kg (5,207 lb)
- Length: 8.415 m (27.61 ft)
- Explosive charge: 346 kg (763 lb) Shimose
- Range and speed: 10,000 m (5.4 nmi) at 38 kn (70 km/h), 15,000 m (8.1 nmi) at 32 kn (59 km/h), 20,000 m (11 nmi) at 27 kn (50 km/h)

Type 8 Late

- Entered service: Unknown, likely 1939~1942
- Propulsion: Wet heater
- Weight: 2,630 kg (5,800 lb)
- Length: 8.38 m (27.5 ft)
- Explosive charge: 400 kg (880 lb) Type 97
- Range and speed: 10,000 m (5.4 nmi) at 41 kn (76 km/h), 15,000 m (8.1 nmi) at 32 kn (59 km/h), 20,000 m (11 nmi) at 26 kn (48 km/h)
- Note: Retrofitted older torpedoes for use during the Second World War.

== Type 12 Project ==
Experimental work on a heavy 61 cm torpedo to surpass the weapons in service at the time, also referred to as the 12th Year Type, referring to Taisho Era year 12 (1923). Circa 1922-1923, pursuant to a Naval Staff requirement to develop a heavy high-speed torpedo, a proposal was put forward for the development of a torpedo powered by an internal combustion engine. The project closely predated the development of oxygen torpedoes in 1928, and used conventional compressed air as the oxidizer. A prototype was developed at the Mitsubishi-Urakami Ordnance Works in Nagasaki. The prototype used a four-stroke six-cylinder vertical inline engine which produced 250 horsepower. The engine was fueled by ethanol, with an elaborate two-stage startup sequence wherein the engine was spun up using compressed air, and thereafter the initial ignition was achieved with a petroleum-based volatile fuel. The engine utilized conventional spark plugs and a magneto to achieve ignition. Fuel was injected at high pressure into the carburetor, in a manner similar to a solid injection system. The cylinders were cooled by ambient seawater which was forcibly directed by an impeller through a cooling manifold. The prototype was successfully tested, but ultimately the project was canceled due to persistent reliability problems with ignition, only a modest improvement over the earlier Type 8 in exchange for increased cost and complexity, and priority being given to the projects which would become the Type 90 and Type 93. During the Second World War, US ordnance intelligence had reasons to believe that the 12th Year Type was in active service and sought samples of the torpedo, even late in the war.

Specifications:

- Prototype date: 1923
- Propulsion: Internal combustion (ethanol-air)
- Weight: 2,500 kg (5,500 lb)
- Length: 8.50 m (27.9 ft)
- Explosive charge: Dummy warhead (propulsion testing only)
- Range and speed: 20,000 m (11 nmi) at 38 kn (70 km/h), 51,000 m (28 nmi) at 26 kn (48 km/h)

During the 1920s and 1930s, Japan placed a special emphasis on the development of 61 cm torpedoes due to the limitations proposed at the Washington Naval Conference, which were codified and resulted in the Washington Naval Treaty of 1922. The treaty clearly specified limitations on other forms of armament, such as warship tonnage, numbers of warships and types thereof allocated, guns of specified inch calibers, and an outright prohibition of guns with calibers exceeding 16 inches (406 mm). However, the treaty made no mention of torpedo size limitations. Thus, heavy torpedoes and other technological advancements such as radar offered the possibility of conferring decisive offensive capability.

== Type 90 ==
Main article: Type 90 torpedo

Development started 1928, in service 1933. The Type 90 was designed as a heavy surface-launched torpedo whose development program ran in tandem with that of the 53 cm Type 89. The engine used was effectively a more powerful version of the same one developed for the Type 89, using the same kerosene-air wet heater cycle. Used on ships during the Second World War, such as the Hatsuharu-class destroyers and in most cruisers, including the Furutaka, Aoba, Myōkō, Takao, and Mogami-class heavy cruisers after refits during the 1930s. During the Second World War, the Type 90 was used alongside the superior Type 93, compatible with the same torpedo tubes as the latter.

Specifications:

- Entered service: 1933
- Propulsion: Wet heater (kerosene-air)
- Weight: 2,605 kg (5,743 lb)
- Length: 8.485 m (27.84 ft)
- Explosive charge: 375 kg (827 lb) Type 91
- Range and speed: 7,000 m (3.8 nmi) at 46 kn (85 km/h), 10,000 m (5.4 nmi) at 42 kn (78 km/h), 15,000 m (8.1 nmi) at 36 kn (67 km/h)

== Type 93 ==
Main article: Type 93 torpedo

Detailed drawing of the Type 93 gas generator (in German).

The Type 93 was an evolution of the earlier Type 90 whose development was inspired by the oxygen-enriched 24.5-inch Mark I torpedo used by the British on the Nelson-class battleships. The Japanese presumed that the Mark I used pure oxygen as the oxidizer, leading to a research program into oxygen torpedoes starting at the Kure Naval Arsenal. In reality, the Mark I was merely oxygen-enriched, and the Japanese research program was novel in its approach. Development began in 1928 and prototypes were produced in 1932. The initial version, known only as the Type 93, was used solely for experiments before the war. The design incorporated unorthodox elements such as a gas generator, coolant turbopump, and regenerative cooling, resembling a liquid propellant rocket engine. The gas generator would burn a small proportion of the torpedo's fuel, driving the turbopump with the resultant gas, which in turn would draw ambient seawater to cool the torpedo's engine. Without a regenerative cooling jacket, the use of pure oxygen would rapidly destroy the engine with excess heat. Following live testing which began in 1933, the Type 93 Mod 1 was adopted in 1936. After the war, the Type 93 torpedo series was nicknamed the "Long Lance", a reference to the Nagae Yari used during the Sengoku period. The Japanese made extensive use of the impressive range and speed of later variants of these torpedoes, for long-range attacks against superior enemy forces as well as night-time sneak attacks.

Specifications:

- Prototype date: 1932
- Propulsion: Wet heater (kerosene-oxygen)
- Weight: 2,700 kg (6,000 lb)
- Length: 9.00 m (29.53 ft)
- Explosive charge: 490 kg (1,080 lb) Type 97
- Range and speed: Unknown, comparable to Type 93 Mod 1 (see below)

== Type 93 Mod 1 ==
The first version put into series production. The actual design put into production was a revised version after a 1936 test series. The torpedo was produced in three modifications. In 1941, two warships, Kitakami and Ōi were converted into dedicated torpedo cruisers carrying an unusually large number of 61 cm tubes. A third vessel, Kiso, was planned to be converted as well, but the plans were changed. The two cruisers each received ten 61 cm quad mounts, capable of filling pressurized oxygen and launching the Type 93; this potentially allowed them to launch two salvoes of 20 torpedoes in rapid succession.

Specifications:

Type 93 Mod 1 Mdf. 1

- Entered service: 1935 (mass production 1936)
- Propulsion: Wet heater (kerosene-oxygen)
- Weight: 2,700 kg (6,000 lb)
- Length: 9.00 m (29.53 ft)
- Explosive charge: 490 kg (1,080 lb) Type 97
- Range and speed: 40,000 m (22 nmi) at 36 kn (67 km/h), 32,000 m (17 nmi) at 40 kn (74 km/h), 20,000 m (11 nmi) at 49 kn (91 km/h)
- Notes: Reinforced body, increased regenerative cooling, phosphor bronze helical gearwheel for the slide valve gearing, compared to Type 93 Mod 1.

Type 93 Mod 1 Mdf. 2

Flow diagram of the final Type 93 Mod 1 Mdf. 2 propulsion system (in German).

- Entered service: 1936 (mass production 1936)
- Propulsion: Wet heater (kerosene-oxygen)
- Weight: 2,700 kg (6,000 lb)
- Length: 9.00 m (29.53 ft)
- Explosive charge: 490 kg (1,080 lb) Type 97
- Range and speed: 40,000 m (22 nmi) at 36 kn (67 km/h), 32,000 m (17 nmi) at 40 kn (74 km/h), 20,000 m (11 nmi) at 49 kn (91 km/h)
- Notes: Further body reinforcements, further increased cooling, cost reduction improvements to the oxygen vessel, changed gear ratio, lubricating system improvements, re-engineered slide valves (the slide valves were replaced with the new type in all older versions of the Type 93).

Type 93 Mod 1 Mdf. 3

- Entered service: 1944 (mass production 1945)
- Propulsion: Wet heater (kerosene-oxygen)
- Weight: 2,700 kg (6,000 lb)
- Length: 9.00 m (29.53 ft)
- Explosive charge: 490 kg (1,080 lb) Type 97
- Range and speed: 40,000 m (22 nmi) at 38 kn (70 km/h), 32,000 m (17 nmi) at 42 kn (78 km/h), 20,000 m (11 nmi) at 50 kn (93 km/h)
- Notes: Never used operationally; successfully tested and approved, but did not reach the field before the end of the war.

== Type 93 Mod 2 ==
Test vehicle only; only two were built, which achieved a record speed of 56 knots (104 km/h; 64 mph) - the fastest torpedo of the Second World War. Experiments with the Mod 2 were used to improve and finalize the design of the Type 95, the derivative of Type 93, which was the fastest mass-produced torpedo of the Second World War. The nose cone of the torpedo had a more pointed design, as opposed to the rounded design of the previous versions, influenced by the design of the Italian W 270/533.4 x 7.2 Veloce torpedo, samples of which were delivered to Japan during the Second World War. The two prototypes had different approaches to engine designs. Prototype 1 had enlarged cylinder bores and engine displacement, which achieved a speed of 51 knots (94 km/h; 59 mph) in testing. Prototype 2 had thicker cylinder walls, stronger piston rods, increased engine inlet pressure, the conical head design from the Italian torpedo, and smaller-pitch propeller blades geared to a higher rotational speed. This second prototype achieved the record of 56 knots in testing. Development was discontinued in order to prioritize turbine propulsion.

Specifications:

- Prototype date: 1936
- Propulsion: Wet heater (kerosene-oxygen)
- Weight: 2,700 kg (6,000 lb)
- Length: 9.00 m (29.53 ft)
- Explosive charge: 490 kg (1,080 lb) Dummy Warhead
- Range and speed: Unknown, achieved top speed of 56 kn (104 km/h)

== Type 93 Mod 3 ==
An improved version with a heavier warhead. Entered service in 1943, with mass production commencing in 1944. To address the hazardous nature of oxygen torpedoes and starting problems, the starting oxidizer was not pure oxygen but instead a mixture of compressed air and tetrachloromethane. The warhead was elongated and contained a load of 780 kg of explosives. This came at a cost of reducing the maximum range to 30000 meters.

Specifications:

- Entered service: 1943 (mass production 1944)
- Propulsion: Wet heater (kerosene-oxygen)
- Weight: 2,800 kg (6,200 lb)
- Length: 9.00 m (29.53 ft)
- Explosive charge: 780 kg (1,720 lb) Type 97
- Range and speed: 30,000 m (16 nmi) at 36–38 kn (67–70 km/h), 25,000 m (13 nmi) at 40–42 kn (74–78 km/h), 15,000 m (8.1 nmi) at 48–50 kn (89–93 km/h)

== M Project ==
Experimental work on a heavy aircraft torpedo carried out starting in 1942. Project canceled 1944. The unit was classified as Shisei Gyorai M (Trial Torpedo M). A derivative of the Type 91 aerial torpedo design, the M-Type was designed to be delivered by a seaplane the design of which was not completed. In an effort to increase propulsive power of the torpedo's engine, a secondary fuel bottle fed a distributor geared to the engine shaft. The distributor directly injected fuel into the cylinders, whereupon the fuel was ignited by the hot gases already present in the combustion chambers. Only three prototypes were constructed at the Yokosuka Naval Arsenal.

Specifications:

- Prototype date: 1944
- Propulsion: Wet heater (kerosene-air), secondary direct injection
- Weight: 2,070 kg (4,560 lb)
- Diameter: 630 mm (25 in)
- Length: 7.10 m (23.3 ft)
- Explosive charge: 750 kg (1,650 lb) Dummy warhead
- Range and speed: 2,500 m (1.3 nmi) at 50 kn (93 km/h)
- Max airdrop speed: 300 kn (560 km/h)

== F Project ==
Experimental series of 61 cm torpedoes, consisting of three incremental designs - F1, F2, and F3. The project was developed in tandem with the Type 93. The three designs were stages of a single overarching project. Development began 1934, pursuant of a staff requirement of a 8000 meter range torpedo with a speed of 60 knots. The torpedo was intended to use an unorthodox kerosene-oxygen turbine engine, similar to turbopumps employed by liquid-propellant rocket engines. A turbine was selected, despite its poor specific air consumption, because piston engines would be of objectionable size, mass, and complexity for the necessary power output. The turbine design incorporated the injection of ambient water into the combustion chamber, which would immediately flash to steam. The use of steam was necessary for reducing heat levels to an acceptable level (500-600°C). Initial experiments with a 750-horsepower test unit revealed a problem with the use of seawater: the extreme conditions in the combustion chamber would cause the deposition of salt on the injector nozzles, partially or totally blocking them. The use of a chemical additive was suggested which would lower the melting point of sodium chloride (~800°C) to a temperature at which solid deposition would be impossible. The use of zinc chloride and magnesium chloride were investigated. Zinc chloride at a 65% solution in water was chosen. The F1 design was concerned with development of the propulsion system; the F2 attempted to produce a working torpedo, and the final culmination was the F3 design. When an additional requirement for a low speed setting of 40 knots with an endurance of 30000 meters was added, development was dropped. The addition of a two-speed gearbox was objectionable, and the geometry of the combustion chamber nozzles was optimized for a single speed. For these reasons, the F project was discontinued, with research and development focus shifting to the Type 93.

Specifications:

F1 Experimental

- Prototype date: 1934 (testing in 1936)
- Propulsion: Superheated turbine (kerosene-air, steam generator)
- Weight: Unknown
- Length: Unknown
- Range and speed: Unknown; low-performance tests
- Notes: Developed at Yokosuka Naval Arsenal. Tests of the propulsion system, using both fresh water and seawater as diluent; development of zinc chloride additive to prevent salt deposition. Compressed air was used as oxidizer. The project was transferred to Kure in 1936.

F2 Experimental

- Prototype date: 1936
- Propulsion: Superheated turbine (kerosene-oxygen, steam generator)
- Weight: Unknown
- Length: Unknown
- Range and speed: Unknown; achieved 50 kn (93 km/h)
- Notes: Alternate design developed at Kure Naval Arsenal. High-performance tests of the propulsion system with zinc chloride additive, improvements to the turbine unit and the depth-keeping apparatus. The oxidizer was switched to pure oxygen.

F3 Experimental

- Prototype date: 1936 (discontinued before 1943)
- Propulsion: Superheated turbine (kerosene-oxygen, steam generator)
- Weight: 2,700 kg (6,000 lb)
- Length: 8.55 m (28.1 ft)
- Explosive charge: 500 kg (1,100 lb) Dummy warhead
- Range and speed: 8,000 m (4.3 nmi) at 60 kn (110 km/h)
- Notes: Developed at Kure Naval Arsenal. Final practical design using the research gleaned from designs F1 and F2. Discontinued in favor of the Type 93.

== Type 0 Project ==
Prototype of a heavy oxygen torpedo in 1944, capitalizing on the best features of the Type 93 Mod 2. The project was designated Type Zero (零式, Rei Shiki) for unknown reasons. Development was initiated after the Type 95 Mod 2 was complete. The project was cancelled while parts were being manufactured for a functional prototype, due to the deteriorating war situation. According to one source, more than one functional prototype was successfully built before cancellation. The Type 0 was an enlarged version of the Type 93, powered by a significantly different four-cylinder double-acting horizontally opposed engine. With a diameter of 72 cm and a weight of five tons, if completed, this could have been the world's heaviest torpedo; a contender of very similar size during the same time period was the British radio-guided MCLOS Helmover torpedo. Most of the weapon's mass was devoted to the propulsion system, giving it an enormous payload, endurance, and projected speed. Intended for launch from ships and potentially shore installations, likely using common hardware intended for Kaiten launch. The project was ostensibly aiming to develop a heavier successor to the Type 93-derived Kaiten. It is not known whether or not the Type Zero was intended to incorporate guidance.

Specifications:

- Project date: 1944
- Propulsion: Wet heater (kerosene-oxygen)
- Weight: 5,000 kg (11,000 lb)
- Diameter: 720 mm (28 in)
- Length: 11.50 m (37.7 ft)
- Explosive charge: 850 kg (1,870 lb) Type 97
- Range and speed: 27,000 m (15 nmi) at 55 kn (102 km/h), 30,000 m (16 nmi) at 50 kn (93 km/h), 54,000 m (29 nmi) at 40 kn (74 km/h)
- Notes: Never built; the worsening logistic situation in the home islands compelled resources to be reallocated to other work.

== See also ==
- Japanese 32 cm torpedo
- Japanese 45 cm torpedo
- Japanese 53 cm torpedo
- List of torpedoes
