= HD-26 =

HD-26 may refer to:

- A D subminiature plug or socket with 26 pins in three rows, strictly DA-26.
- The Heinkel HD 26 seaplane
