= Mitsubishi 2MB2 =

Japanese light bomber prototype

2MB2
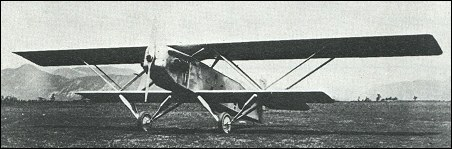

General information
- Type: Light bomber
- National origin: Japan
- Manufacturer: Mitsubishi
- Number built: 1

History
- First flight: December 1925

The Mitsubishi 2MB2 or Experimental Washi-type Light Bomber was a prototype Japanese single-engined biplane light bomber of the 1920s. A single example was built for the Imperial Japanese Army, but no production followed.

== Design and development ==
In 1925, the Imperial Japanese Army issued a specification for a single-engined bomber, requesting responses from Mitsubishi, Nakajima and Kawasaki. To design an aircraft to meet this requirement, Mitsubishi hired the German designer Alexander Baumann, a professor at Stuttgart University, and former designer of Riesenflugzeug for Zeppelin-Staaken to supervise the design team, with Nobushiro Nakata as chief designer.

The team led by Baumann and Nakata designed a sesquiplane (i.e. a biplane with the lower wing much smaller than the upper) of mixed wood and metal construction. The high-aspect ratio wings were braced by struts arranged in a "W" shape forming a Warren truss, while the fuselage had a metal structure covered in fabric, carrying the crew of two who sat in open cockpits. The aircraft was powered by a single Mitsubishi Hi V-12 (Hispano-Suiza Lb) V12 engine driving a two-bladed fixed pitch metal propeller and had a fixed conventional landing gear. The aircraft carried up to 800 kg (1,800 lb) of bombs, with the pilot aiming two fixed forward firing machine guns, and the observer operating two flexibly mounted machine guns, one in a dorsal position and one in a ventral mount.

The prototype bomber, known as the 2MB2, or Experimental Washi-type Light Bomber (Washi - Eagle), was completed in December 1925. While it demonstrated good performance, and was rated as superior to the proposals from Kawasaki (a modified version of the Dornier Do C) and Nakajima (the Breguet 19) by the Army evaluators, it was considered to too expensive to build owing to its complex structure, and was also rejected. The Japanese Army instead adopted a modified version of Mitsubishi's Navy Type 13 Carrier Attack Aircraft as the Army Type 87 Light Bomber (company designation 2MB1), despite a poorer performance and bombload.

== Specifications ==
Data from Japanese Aircraft 1910–1941

General characteristics

- Crew: 2
- Length: 9.85 m (32 ft 4 in)
- Wingspan: 20.0 m (65 ft 7 in)
- Height: 4.10 m (13 ft 5 in)
- Wing area: 64.0 m^{2} (689 sq ft)
- Empty weight: 2,100 kg (4,630 lb)
- Gross weight: 3,640 kg (8,025 lb)
- Powerplant: 1 × Mitsubishi Hi V-12 water-cooled V12 engine, 450 kW (600 hp)

Performance

- Maximum speed: 210 km/h (130 mph, 110 kn) at sea level
- Endurance: 3 hr
- Service ceiling: 6,000 m (20,000 ft)

Armament

- Guns: 2× fixed forward firing 7.7 mm machine guns, 1× flexibly mounted 7.7 mm machine gun in dorsal position, 1× flexibly mounted 7.7 mm machine gun in ventral position
- Bombs: 800 kg (1,800 lb) bombs
