= Mitsubishi 2MB1 =

Japanese light bomber

2MB1
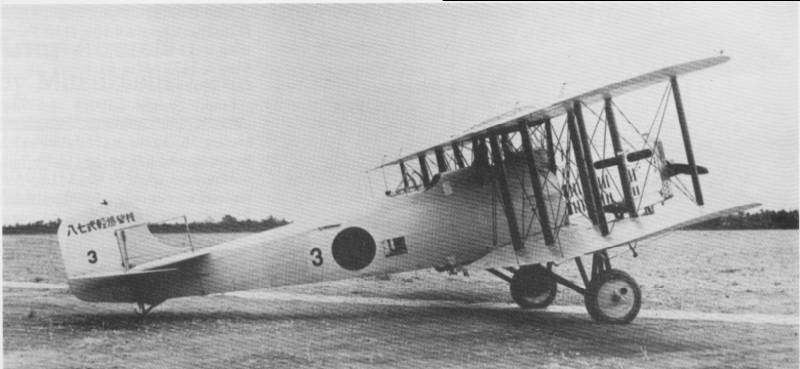

General information
- Type: Bomber
- National origin: Japan
- Manufacturer: Mitsubishi
- Primary user: Imperial Japanese Army
- Number built: 48

History
- First flight: ca 1926
- Developed from: Mitsubishi B1M

The Mitsubishi 2MB1 (service designation 八七式軽爆撃機, Army Type 87 Light Bomber) was a light bomber produced in Japan in the mid-1920s to equip the Imperial Japanese Army.

== Development ==
It was developed in parallel to the 2MB2, but while that aircraft featured an innovative and unorthodox design, the 2MB1 was a more conservative approach based closely on the 2MT carrier-based torpedo bomber that was already in production for the Imperial Japanese Navy. Like the 2MT, the 2MB1 was a conventional two-bay biplane with open cockpits in tandem and fixed tailskid undercarriage. The 2MT's Napier engine and side-mounted radiators were exchanged for a Hispano-Suiza engine and frontal radiator, and specific naval features such as folding wings were deleted.

== Operational history ==
The type saw action in the early stages of Japan's Invasion of Manchuria in 1931, but it was found to be obsolete and was soon relegated to training duties.

== Specifications ==
Data from The Illustrated Encyclopedia of Aircraft

General characteristics

- Crew: Two, pilot and gunner
- Length: 10.00 m (32 ft 10 in)
- Wingspan: 14.80 m (48 ft 7 in)
- Height: 3.63 m (11 ft 11 in)
- Wing area: 60.0 m^{2} (646 sq ft)
- Empty weight: 1,800 kg (3,970 lb)
- Gross weight: 3,300 kg (7,280 lb)
- Powerplant: 1 × Hispano-Suiza , 336 kW (450 hp)

Performance

- Maximum speed: 185 km/h (115 mph, 100 kn)

Armament

- 1 × fixed, forward-firing 7.7 mm (.303 in) machine gun
- 2 × flexible 7.7 mm (.303 in) machine guns on ring mount in rear cockpit
- 1 × flexible 7.7 mm (.303 in) machine gun firing through ventral hatch
- 500 kg (1,102 lb) of bombs
