= Aichi AB-1 =

AB-1
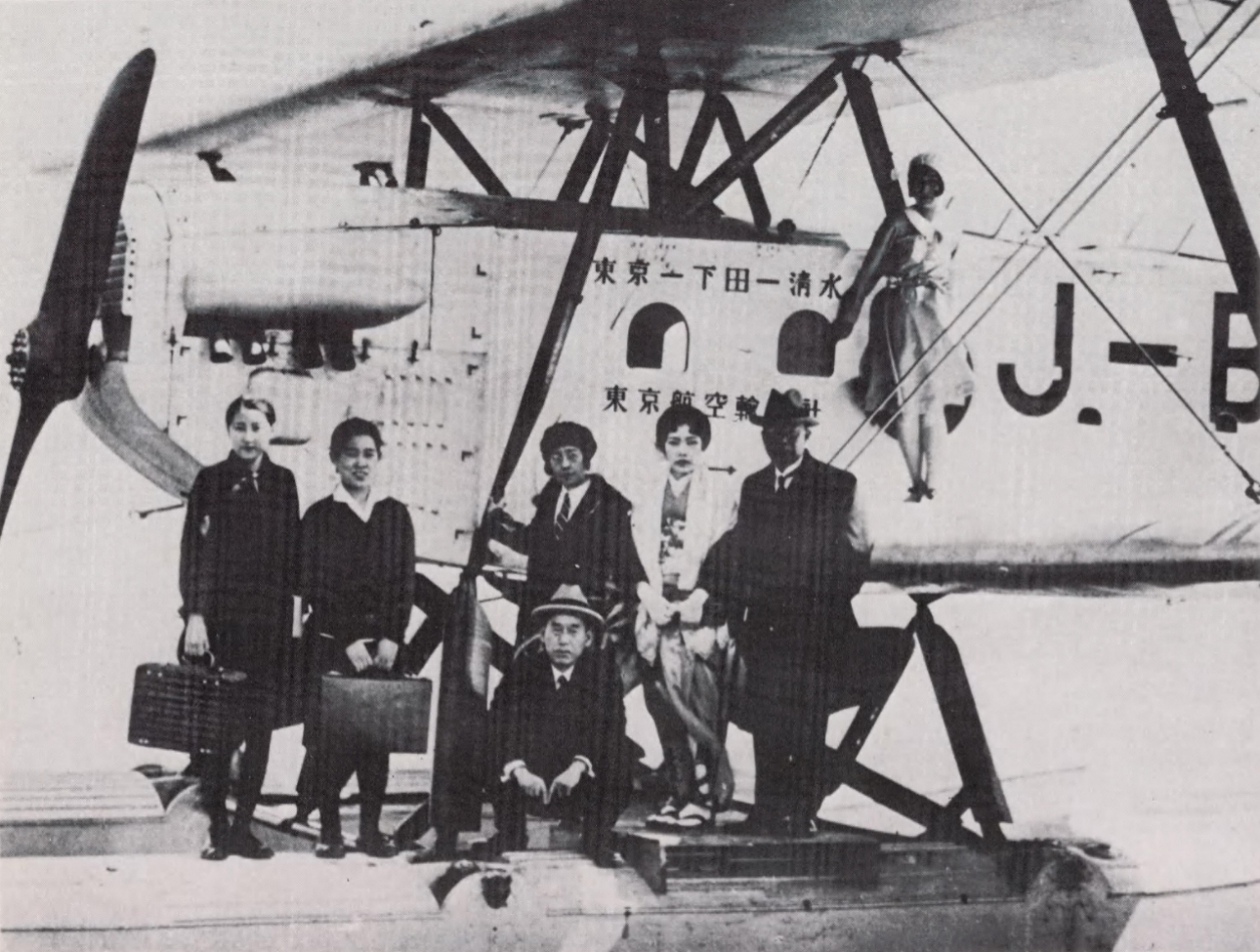
- Aichi AB-1 J-BAKL

General information
- Type: Four passenger civil transport
- National origin: Japan
- Manufacturer: Aichi Kokuki
- Designer: Tokuichiro Gomei
- Primary user: Tokyo Koku KK
- Number built: 1

History
- First flight: 1928

The Aichi AB-1 was a result of a 1926 government call for a small, Japanese-built, civil transport biplane able to operate from land or water. It won the contest in both roles, but did not reach production as airlines moved from biplanes to monoplanes. Nonetheless, it remained in commercial use well into the 1930s.

== Design and development ==
In February 1926, three manufacturers responded to a funded call from the Aircraft Bureau of the Department for a Japanese built, small passenger aircraft. All three designs were single-engined biplanes, and all were based on earlier designs, only one of which was Japanese. Aichi's contestant was based on the Heinkel HD 25, a two seat reconnaissance seaplane that Aichi had built as the Navy Type 2, while military aircraft construction in post-world War I Germany remained forbidden. Alterations included a new engine, the passenger cabin, wings with slightly greater span, reduced stagger and revised struttage, a new vertical tail and optional additional landplane landing gear.

The AB-1 had a wooden structure which was covered with a mixture of plywood and fabric. It was a single bay biplane with wings of rectangular plan out to rounded tips and with forward stagger, braced together with N-form interplane struts. The wing centre-section was held well above the fuselage on pairs of inverted V-struts on each side, and another pair of single struts from the lower fuselage longerons to the forward wing spars. The ailerons were on the upper wings.

It was powered by a 450–485 hp (336–362 kW), Aichi-built water-cooled Lorraine 12E Courlis. The flat-sided fuselage included open, tandem cockpits for the crew and a four seat passenger cabin below the upper wing with a pair of small windows on each side, the forward one in a rear-hinged door that opened ahead of the lower leading edge. The tail was conventional, with a tailplane mounted high on the fuselage and a cropped triangular profile fin. Both rudder and elevators were balanced.

The AB-1 landplane had fixed, split axle landing gear with axles parallel to the ground, their inner ends hinged on a V-strut from the lower fuselage. Both its landing legs, with prominent shock absorbers, and its rearwards drag struts were mounted on the lower fuselage longerons.

One of the Aircraft Bureau's requirements was for ready exchange between landplane and seaplane undercarriages. The floats added 2.26 m (7.4 ft) to the overall length and increased the empty weight by 21%. The extra drag and weight inevitably lowered performance, reducing cruise speed by 7% and climb rate to 3,000 m (9,800 ft) by 40%.

== Operational history ==
The AB-1, along with the Mitsubishi MC-1 met the Air Bureau's requirements (the entrant from Nakajima crashed during tests) and the Aichi was the winner with first prize in its seaplane form and second as a landplane. Both designs were criticized, amongst other things, for providing a poor field of view for the pilot. This problem assisted the rise of monoplane transport aircraft, sealed when Japan Air Transport (J.A.T.) imported Fokker Super Universals for its fleet. As a result only one AB-1 was built, though J.A.T. did use it commercially as a landplane during 1929 while they waited for the Fokkers to arrive.

After ending its J.A.T. duty, the AB-1 flew the Tokyo-Shimoda route on floats for many years, operated by Tokyo Koku (Tokyo Air).

== Operators ==
- Nihon Koku Yuso KK (Japan Air Transport Co., Ltd.)
- Tokyo Koku KK (Tokyo Air Co., Ltd.)

== Specifications (landplane) ==
Data from Japanese Aircraft 1910-1941

General characteristics

- Crew: two
- Capacity: four passengers
- Length: 9.90 m (32 ft 6 in)
- Wingspan: 15.11 m (49 ft 7 in)
- Height: 3.73 m (12 ft 3 in)
- Wing area: 59.2 m^{2} (637 sq ft)
- Empty weight: 1,680 kg (3,704 lb)
- Gross weight: 2,710 kg (5,975 lb)
- Powerplant: 1 × Aichi-Lorraine 12E Courlis water-cooled W-12, 336–362 kW (450–485 hp)
- Propellers: 2-bladed

Performance

- Maximum speed: 196 km/h (122 mph, 106 kn)
- Cruise speed: 140 km/h (87 mph, 76 kn)
- Service ceiling: 4,000 m (13,000 ft)
- Time to altitude: 24 m to 3,000 m (9,800 ft)
