= Olpp =

Olpp is a surname. Notable people with the surname include:

- Archibald E. Olpp (1882-1949), American physician and politician
- Gottlieb Olpp (1872-1950), German missionary and doctor
