= Mitsubishi MC-1 =

Japanese airliner prototype

MC-1
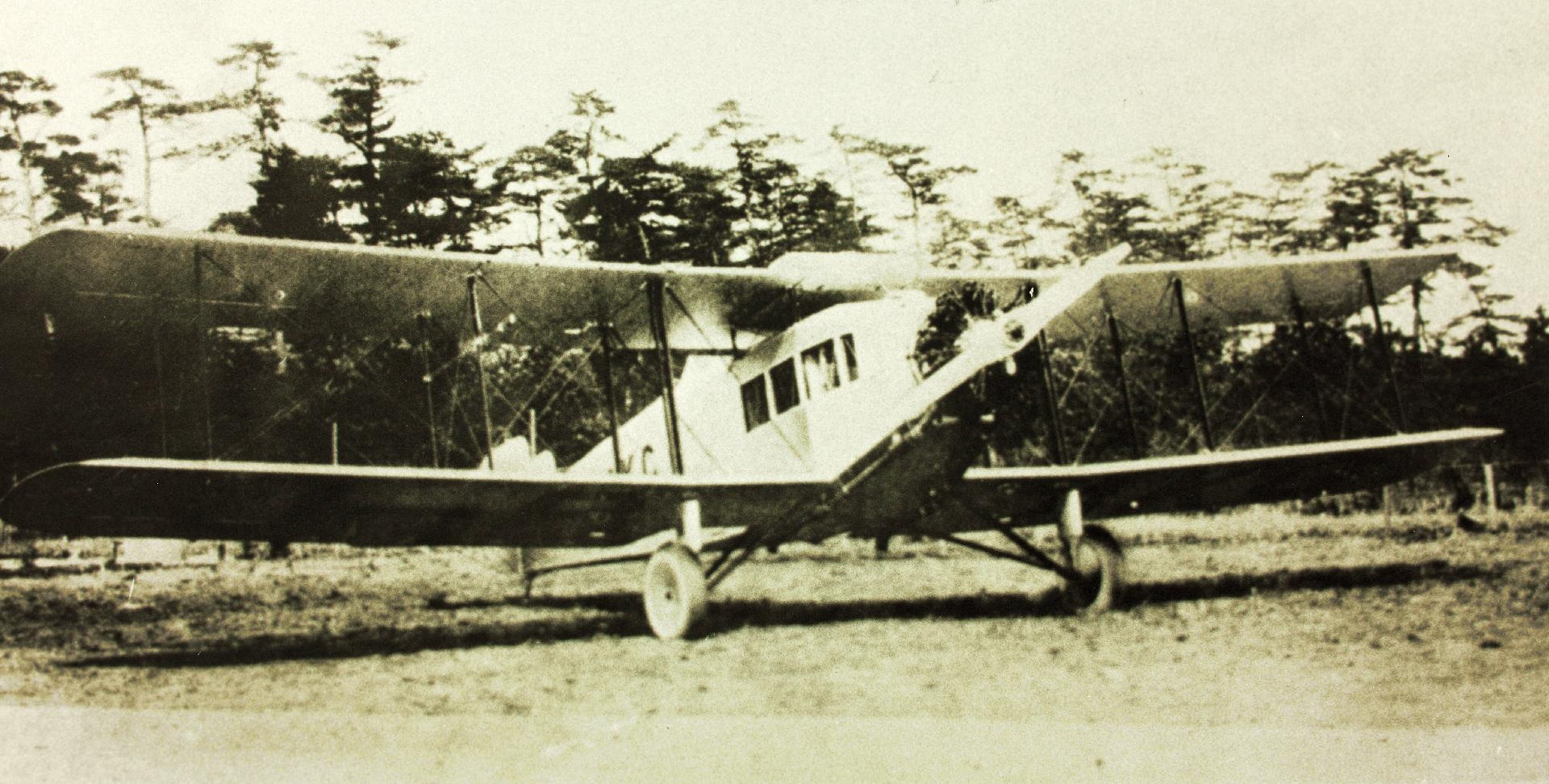

General information
- Type: Biplane airliner
- National origin: Japan
- Manufacturer: Mitsubishi Aircraft Company
- Number built: 1

History
- First flight: 1928
- Retired: 1938
- Developed from: Mitsubishi B1M

The Mitsubishi MC-1 was a 1920s Japanese single-engined biplane airliner designed and built by the Mitsubishi Aircraft Company.

== Design and development ==
In 1927, the Japanese Department of Communications launched a competition to design and build an indigenous passenger transport aircraft. Mitsubishi's design to meet this requirement was based on its Mitsubishi B1M torpedo bomber, using the wings of the earlier aircraft combined with a new fuselage. The MC-1 was large three-bay biplane powered by a 385 hp (287 kW) Armstrong Siddeley Jaguar radial engine and it had an open cockpit behind the wings for the pilot and room for four (some sources say eight) passengers in an enclosed cabin in the forward fuselage. The MC-1 had a fixed conventional landing gear but could also be fitted with twin floats.

The MC-1 was completed in April 1928, and was evaluated against the other two competitors, the Aichi AB-1 and Nakajima N-36, both of which were also biplanes. No production followed of any of the aircraft, as they were considered obsolete compared with foreign types, and the state-owned airline Japan Air Transport (Nihon Koko Yuso KK) ordered Fokker Universal monoplanes instead.

== Operational history ==
Although no production of the MC-1 followed, the prototype was used to operate an experimental air service between Tokyo and Osaka sponsored by the Asahi Shimbun newspaper between June 1928 and April 1929, and then by Japan Air Transport for services in Korea until May 1930. It was then used as a seaplane flying sightseeing flights around the north coast of Honshu until 1938.

== Specifications (Landplane) ==
Data from Japanese Aircraft 1910–1941

General characteristics

- Crew: 2
- Capacity: 4 (or 8) passengers
- Length: 10.475 m (34 ft 4 in)
- Wingspan: 14.75 m (48 ft 5 in)
- Height: 3.80 m (12 ft 6 in)
- Wing area: 59 m^{2} (640 sq ft)
- Empty weight: 1,550 kg (3,417 lb)
- Gross weight: 2,600 kg (5,732 lb)
- Powerplant: 1 × Armstrong Siddeley Jaguar 14-cylinder air-cooled radial engine, 287 kW (385 hp)

Performance

- Maximum speed: 191 km/h (119 mph, 103 kn)
- Endurance: 6 hr
- Time to altitude: 3,000 m (9850 ft) in 20 min 36 s

== See also ==
Related development

- Mitsubishi B1M

Aircraft of comparable role, configuration, and era

- Aichi AB-1
