= Heinkel HD 26 =

HD 26
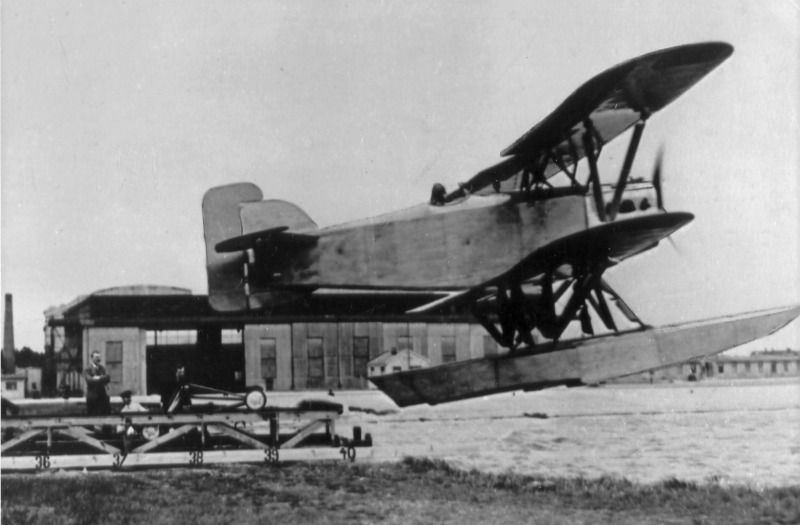

General information
- Type: Reconnaissance seaplane
- National origin: Germany
- Manufacturer: Heinkel, Aichi
- Primary user: Imperial Japanese Navy
- Number built: 2

History
- First flight: 1928

The Heinkel HD 26 was a reconnaissance seaplane developed in Germany during the 1920s for production in Japan. It was intended as a smaller, single-seat counterpart to the HD 25, to provide a spotter aircraft for warships and to take off from a short ramp. The HD 26 was a conventional biplane with staggered wings, twin float undercarriage, and an open cockpit.

The pattern aircraft supplied by Heinkel was powered by a 300 hp Hispano-Suiza V-8 engine, but the single example of the Aichi Navy Type 2 Single-seat Reconnaissance Seaplane built by Aichi had an Aichi-built 420 hp Bristol Jupiter VI instead. Launching ramps were built on the battleship Nagato and the cruiser Furutaka for trials, but the HD 25 and HD 26 were already obsolete.

== Variants ==
Heinkel HD 26
Heinkel Doppeldekker 26, German built prototype of a single seat reconnaissance/fighter seaplane
Heinkel Small Reconnaissance Seaplane
Unofficial designation for the Heinkel built prototype
Heinkel-go Reconnaissance Seaplane
An alternative unofficial designation for the HD 26
Aichi Navy Type 2 Single-seat Reconnaissance Seaplane
The official designation for the Heinkel and Aichi built prototypes

== Specifications (Aichi-built) ==
General characteristics

- Crew: Two, pilot and observer
- Length: 8.44 m (27 ft 8 in)
- Wingspan: 11.80 m (38 ft 9 in)
- Height: 3.59 m (11 ft 10 in)
- Wing area: 37.8 m^{2} (407 sq ft)
- Empty weight: 1,150 kg (2,540 lb)
- Gross weight: 1,500 kg (3,310 lb)
- Powerplant: 1 × Aichi-built Bristol Jupiter VI , 420 kW (310 hp)

Performance

- Maximum speed: 211 km/h (132 mph, 115 kn)
- Rate of climb: 6.7 m/s (1,310 ft/min)
