= Mitsubishi 1MT =

Japanese carrier-borne torpedo bomber

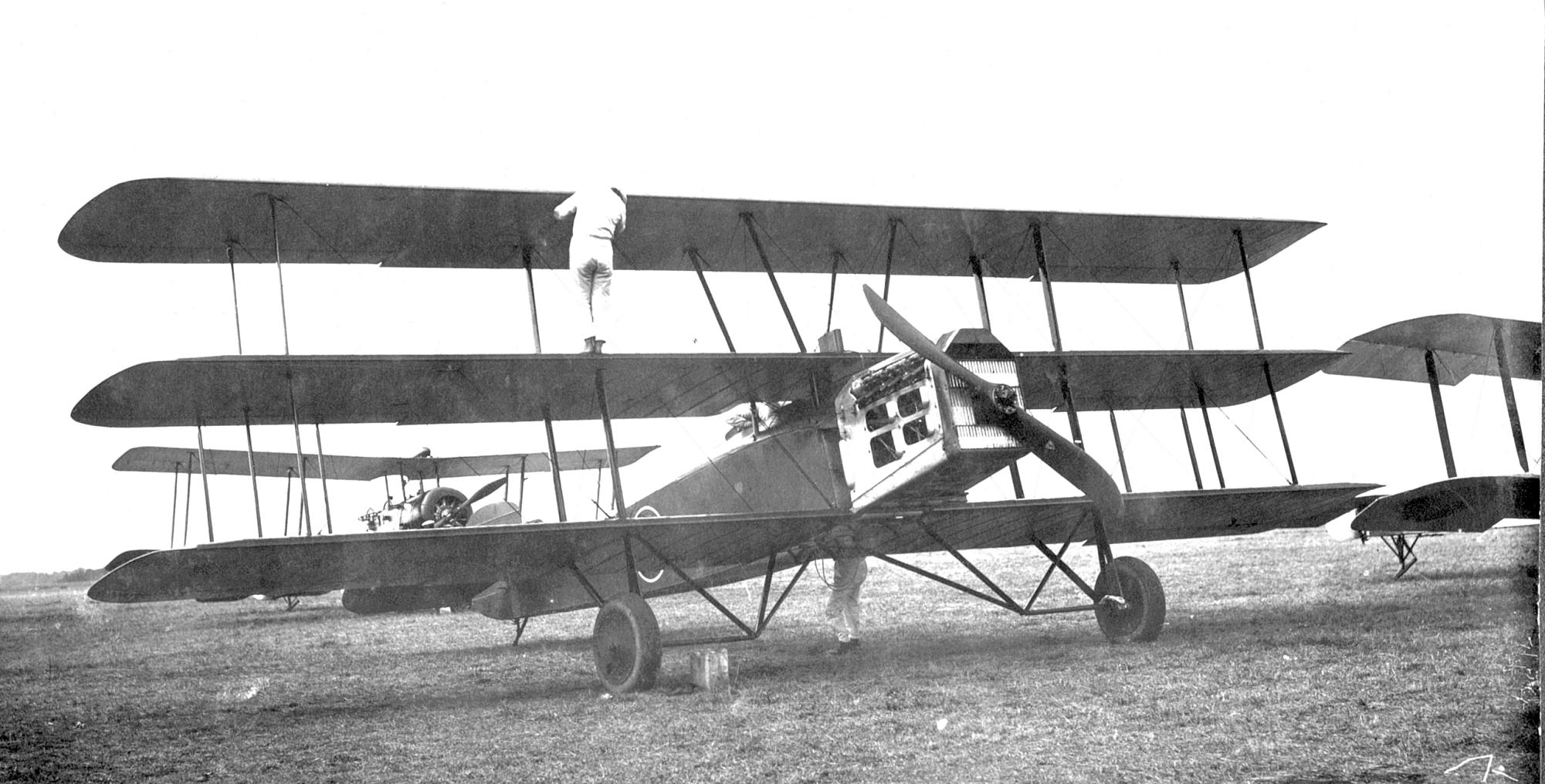

General information
- Type: Triplane torpedo bomber
- National origin: Japan
- Manufacturer: Mitsubishi
- Designer: Herbert Smith
- Primary user: Imperial Japanese Navy Air Service
- Number built: 20

History
- First flight: 1922

The Mitsubishi 1MT was a Japanese single-seat triplane torpedo bomber built by Mitsubishi for the Imperial Japanese Navy Air Service. Designed by the former Sopwith designer Herbert Smith, it was intended for use aboard the Japanese aircraft carrier Hōshō.

The 1MT1N flew for the first time in August 1922, and it entered service as the Navy Type 10 Torpedo Bomber or Carrier Attacker. Twenty aircraft were built, but the aircraft were difficult to fly and unable to operate from an aircraft carrier when carrying a torpedo. The type was soon withdrawn and scrapped.

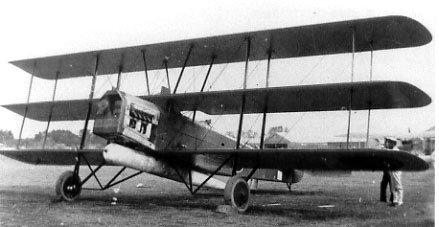
A 1MT with torpedo fitted

== Operators ==
Japan

- Imperial Japanese Navy Air Service

== Specifications (1MT1N) ==
Data from Japanese Aircraft 1910-1941

General characteristics

- Crew: 1
- Length: 9.78 m (32 ft 1 in)
- Wingspan: 13.26 m (43 ft 6 in)
- Height: 4.46 m (14 ft 7.5 in)
- Wing area: 43 m^{2} (463 sq ft)
- Empty weight: 1,370 kg (3,020 lb)
- Gross weight: 2,500 kg (5,511 lb)
- Powerplant: 1 × Napier Lion , 336 kW (450 hp)

Performance

- Maximum speed: 209 km/h (130 mph, 110 kn)
- Service ceiling: 6,000 m (19,680 ft)

Armament

- 1 × 457 mm (18 in), 800 kg (1,764 lb) torpedo

== See also ==
Related lists

- List of military aircraft of Japan
