= List of Japanese World War II explosives =

This is a complete list of Japanese explosives used during the Second World War. It is sorted according to application.

Explosive	Type	Application	Navy or Army	Japanese designation	Comments
Mercury fulminate Potassium chlorate Antimony trisulfide	Primer cap composition		Army	Bakufun	Mk I and Mk III powders are ammunition primers, Mk II is a fuze primer
Potassium chlorate Antimony trisulfide	Primer cap composition		Both	-	Most common mixture for fuze primers
Mercury fulminate	Initiator in fuzes and blasting caps		Both	Raikoo (Thunder Mercury)	
Lead azide	Initiator in fuzes and blasting caps		Both	Chikka Namari	Most common initiator
Tetryl	Sub-booster		Both	Meiayaku	Pressed.
RDX	Sub-booster		Army	Shouyaku	Pressed. Often used with wax
70% Trinitroanisole; 30% HND	Main charge, auxiliary booster	bombs, sea mines, depth charges	Navy	H_{2} kongo or Type 98	Pressed.
TNT	Main charge	Projectiles, hand grenades rarely in bombs	Army	Chakatusuyaku (tea colored explosive)	Usually cast in paper wrapped blocks
Picric acid	Main charge and main booster charge	bombs, projectiles, sea mines, land mines	Both	Ooshokuyaku (Yellow color explosive) or Shimose	Most commonly used booster. Pressed
66% Ammonium perchlorate 16% Silicon carbide 12% wood pulp 6% oil	Main charge	mines, depth charges	Navy	Type 88	Loose grey powder. Friction sensitive.
Trinitroanisole	Main charge	bombs	Navy	Type 91	Cast
60% Trinitroanisole; 40% RDX	Main charge	torpedo warheads	Navy	Type 94	
60% TNT; 40% HND	Main charge	torpedo warheads, depth charges	Navy	Seigate or Type 97	Cast blocks
70% Trinitroanisole; 30% HND	Main charge	bombs, sea mines, depth charges	Navy	Type 98	Poured into case and cast
81% Ammonium picrate 16% aluminium powder 2% wood pulp 1% oil	Main charge	depth charges	Navy	Type 1	Loose powder
60% TNT; 24% HND; 16%aluminium powder	Main charge	torpedo warheads	Navy	Otsu-B	
25% TNT; 75% picric acid	Main charge	bombs	Army	Chaooyaku	Used rarely. TNT lowers the melting point making it suitable for casting
50% Picric acid 50% Dinitronaphthalene	Main charge	projectiles	Army	Oonayaku	Used rarely. Dinitronapthalene aids casting.
90% Picric acid 10% Wax	Main charge	projectiles	Army	Ooshivaku	Used in the nose of armour piercing projectiles. Insensitive.
70% TNT; 30% Dinitronaphthalene	Main charge	projectiles	Army	Chanayaku	Cast
70% to 50% TNT; 30% to 50% RDX	Main charge	bombs, projectiles, landmines and bangalore torpedoes	Army	Nigo tanooyaku (Mk2)	Cast
75% Ammonium nitrate 25% RDX	Main charge	bombs	Army	Anga yaku	Cast in case. Hygroscopic
