= Mitsubishi B1M =

Japanese carrier-borne torpedo bomber

B1M
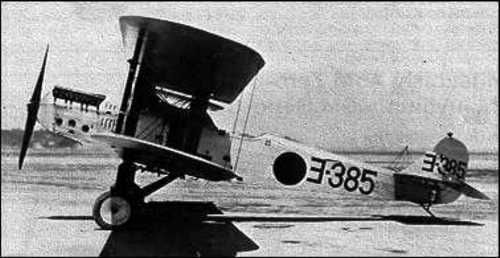

General information
- Type: Torpedo bomber
- Manufacturer: Mitsubishi
- Primary user: Imperial Japanese Navy
- Number built: 443

History
- Introduction date: 1924
- First flight: 1923
- Variants: Mitsubishi 2MB1

The Mitsubishi B1M was a Japanese torpedo bomber of the 1920s, also known as the Navy Type 13 Carrier-Borne Attack Aircraft. It was designed and built by Mitsubishi and used in combat against China. The aircraft was used by the air services of the Imperial Japanese Navy and Imperial Japanese Army.

== Development ==
While working with the Mitsubishi company, the British aircraft designer Herbert Smith designed the 2MT1 two-seat biplane torpedo bomber, which flew for the first time in January 1923. It went into Japanese Navy service as the Type 13-1 carrier-borne attack aircraft or B1M1 and was followed by the 2MT2 and 2MT3 variants (also designated B1M1). The redesigned Type 13-2 was designated B1M2. The final version, the Type 13-3 or B1M3, had the company designation 3MT2 and was a three-seater. Total production was 443. The B1M was powered by a 450 hp (340 kW) Napier Lion or Hispano-Suiza engine according to version.

== Operational history ==
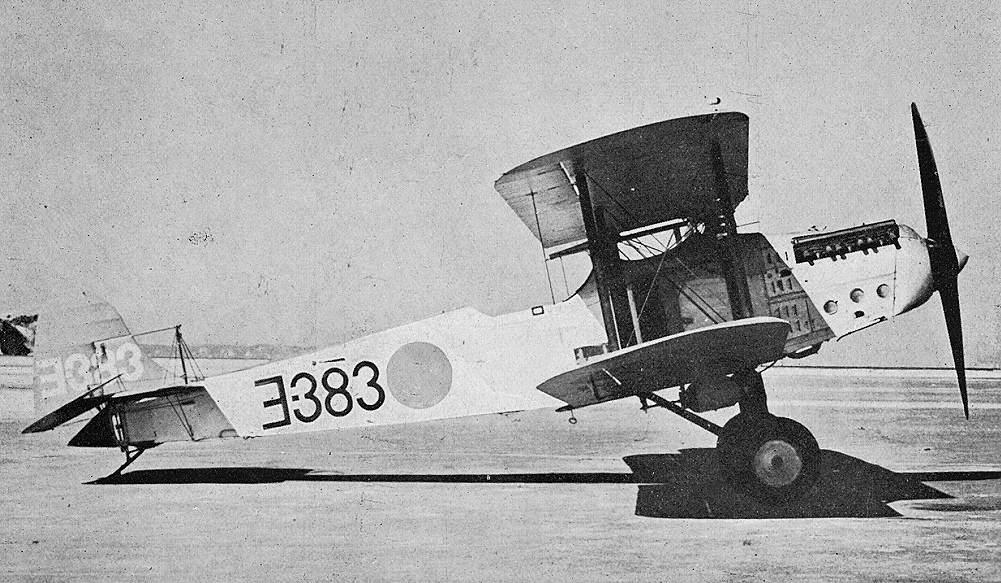

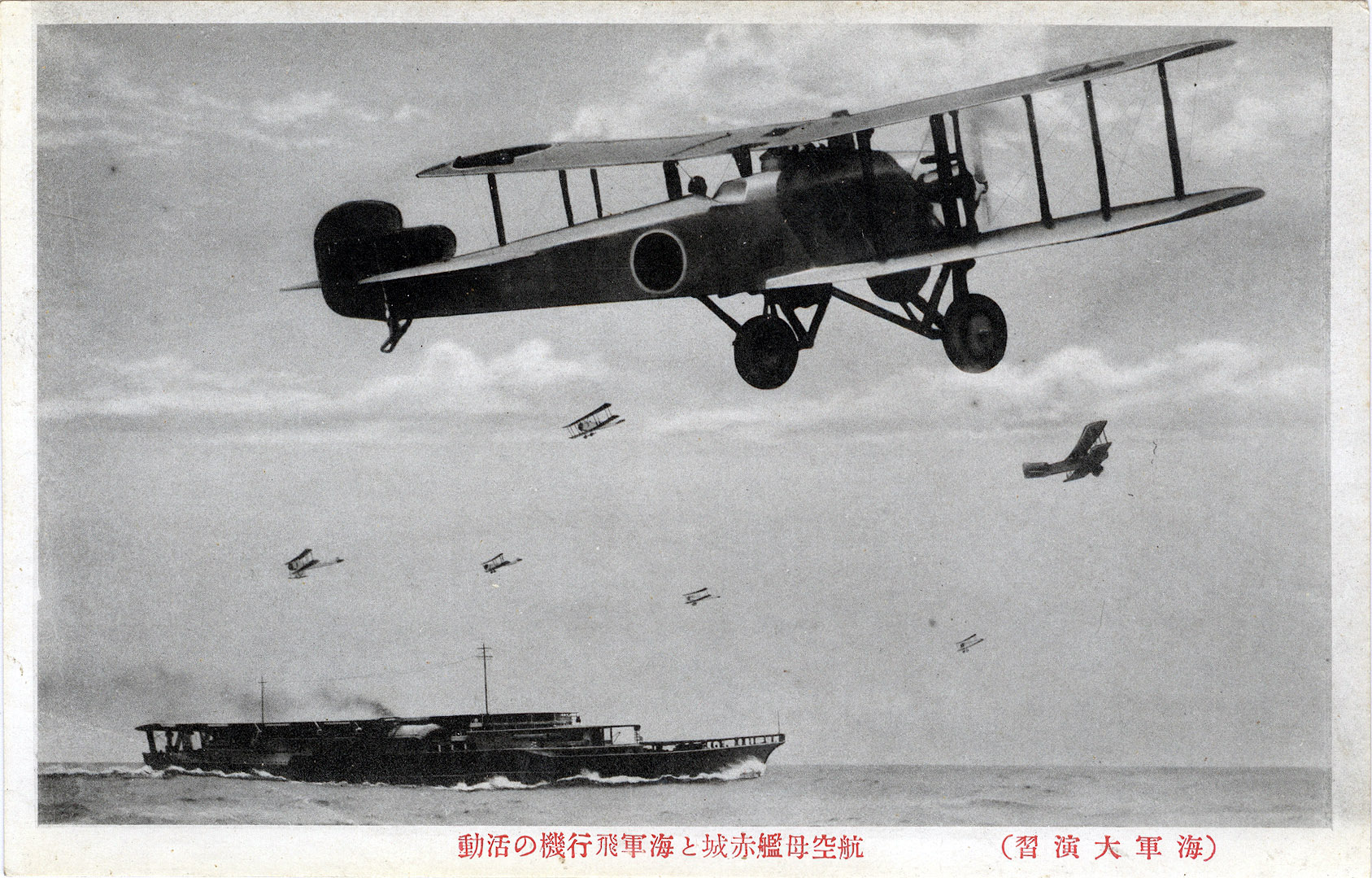
Mitsubishi B1M and aircraft carrier Akagi, c1935

The type entered service in 1924 and served into the 1930s, with thirty-two flying from the aircraft carriers Kaga and Hōshō during the Shanghai Incident in 1932. An aircraft from Kaga was lost during an aerial engagement between an American air force adviser and demonstration pilot to the Chinese government, Robert Short, who lost his life and was regarded as a hero defending the Chinese city against Japanese aircraft. Four days later, a 15-aircraft formation composed of Nakajima A1N fighters and B1Ms attacked Qiaosi Airbase in Hangzhou, and, in the ensuing dogfight, at least one Chinese Junkers K 47 fighter was shot down.

From 1929, a number of surplus B1Ms were converted for civilian use, being fitted with an enclosed cabin for passengers or cargo.

== Variants ==
=== Navy long formal designations ===
Navy Type 13-1 Carrier Attack Aircraft
B1M1
Navy Type 13-2 Carrier Attack Aircraft
B1M2
Navy Type 13-3 Carrier Attack Aircraft
B1M3

=== Navy short designations ===
B1M1
Initial two seat production version powered by 450 hp (340 kW) Napier Lion engine. . 197 built by Mitsubishi.

B1M2
Three-seat production torpedo bomber, based on 2MT5, powered by Mitsubishi Hi V-12 engine. 115 built by Mitsubishi.

B1M3
Improved B1M2 with revised propeller and reduction gear. 128 built by Mitsubishi and Hiro Naval Arsenal.

=== Company designations ===
2MT1
Navy Type 13-1 Carrier Attack Aircraft / B1M1

2MT2
Navy Type 13-1 Carrier Attack Aircraft / B1M1

2MT3
Navy Type 13-1 Carrier Attack Aircraft / B1M1

2MT4 Ohtori
Experimental reconnaissance seaplane version. One built.

2MT5 Tora
Prototype of the B1M2 / Navy Type 13-2 Carrier Attack Aircraft, two-seat torpedo bomber powered by 450 hp (340 kW) Mitsubishi Hi V-12 engine (licensed built Hispano-Suiza Lb). One built.

3MT1
Navy Type 13-2 Carrier Attack Aircraft / B1M2

3MT2
Navy Type 13-3 Carrier Attack Aircraft / B1M3

=== Army designations ===
Mitsubishi Army Type 87 Light Bomber
Mitsubishi B1Ms used by the IJAAS .

=== Civilian designations ===
T-1.2 Converted Aeroplane
Civil conversion of B1M. Several variations on type. Enclosed cabin for two or three passengers. Powered by original Lion or Hispano-Suiza engines or converted with licensed built Bristol Jupiter radial engine. Also known as Type 13th Year Converted Aeroplane.

== Operators ==
Japan

- Imperial Japanese Navy

== Specifications (2MT2) ==
Data from The Encyclopedia of World Aircraft

General characteristics

- Crew: 2
- Length: 9.77 m (32 ft 1 in)
- Wingspan: 14.77 m (48 ft 5 in)
- Height: 3.5 m (11 ft 6 in)
- Wing area: 59 m^{2} (640 sq ft)
- Empty weight: 1,442 kg (3,179 lb)
- Max takeoff weight: 2,697 kg (5,946 lb)
- Powerplant: 1 × Napier Lion W-12 water-cooled piston engine, 370 kW (500 hp)
- Propellers: 2-bladed fixed-pitch propeller

Performance

- Maximum speed: 210 km/h (130 mph, 110 kn)
- Endurance: 2.6 hours
- Service ceiling: 4,500 m (14,800 ft)
- Wing loading: 45.7 kg/m^{2} (9.4 lb/sq ft)
- Power/mass: 0.14 kW/kg (0.085 hp/lb)

Armament

- Guns: 2 × fixed, forward-firing 7.7 mm machine guns and 2 × pivoted 7.7 mm machine guns in rear cockpit
- Bombs: 1 × 460 mm (18 in) torpedo or 2 × 240 kg (529 lb) bombs

== See also ==
Related development

- Mitsubishi 2MB
- Mitsubishi MC-1

Aircraft of comparable role, configuration, and era

- Blackburn Dart

Related lists

- List of military aircraft of Japan
- List of aircraft of the Japanese Navy
