= Shimose powder =

Japanese naval shell-filling adopted in 1893

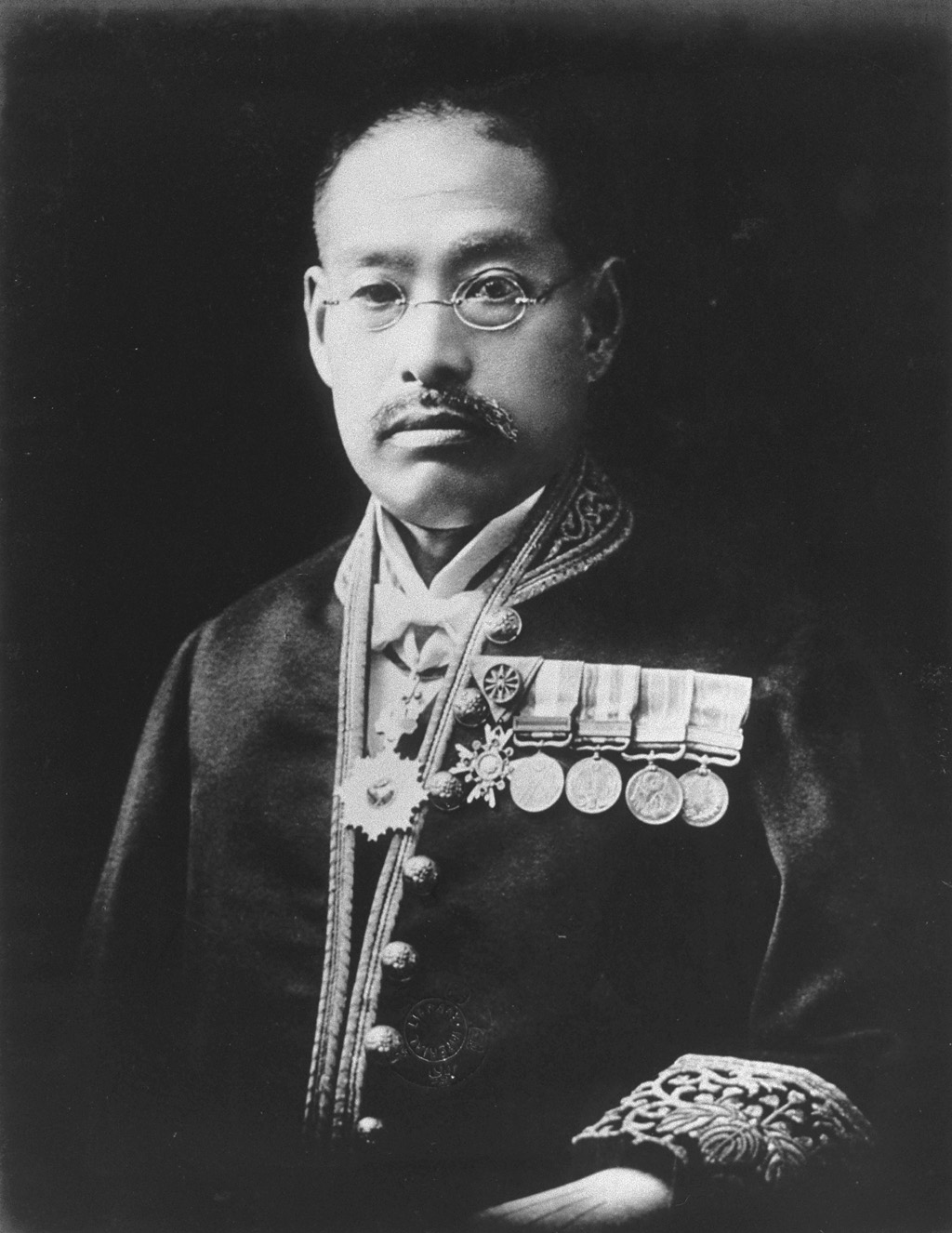

Shimose powder (下瀬火薬, Shimose kayaku) was a type of explosive shell-filling developed by the Japanese naval engineer Shimose Masachika (1860–1911).

Shimose, born in Hiroshima Prefecture, graduated from Tokyo Imperial University and became one of Japan's earliest holders of a doctorate in engineering. In 1887, the Imperial Japanese Navy hired him as a chemical engineer, and from 1899 he headed a research unit tasked with developing a more powerful type of shell-filling for use by naval artillery.

Shimose developed a new explosive based on picric acid – already used by France in the form of Melinite and by Britain in the form of Lyddite. Picric acid has an instability problem when in contact with iron or other heavy metals, so the French mixed it with collodion and the British mixed it with dinitrobenzene and vaseline to form compounds for stability within gun shells. On the other hand, Shimose coated the inside of a shell with unpigmented Japanese lacquer and further sealed it with wax to prevent his powder from coming into contact with the metal shell. Because it was undiluted, the explosive generated more heat and blast speed than any other high explosive available at the time. The Imperial Japanese Navy adopted Shimose powder, with its composition treated as top secret, from 1893 – not only for naval artillery but also for naval mines, depth charges and torpedo warheads. It played an important role in the Japanese victory in the Russo-Japanese War of 1904 to 1905.

== See also ==
- Armstrong's mixture
