= Heinkel HD 25 =

HD 25
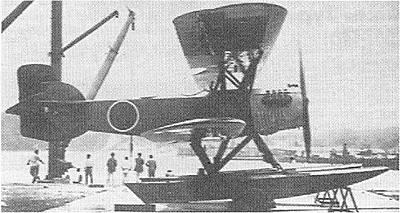
- Heinkel HD 25 of the Imperial Japanese Navy

General information
- Type: Reconnaissance seaplane
- National origin: Germany
- Manufacturer: Heinkel, Aichi
- Primary user: Imperial Japanese Navy
- Number built: ca. 18

History
- Introduction date: 1928
- First flight: 1926

The Heinkel HD 25 was a two-seat shipboard biplane reconnaissance floatplane developed in Germany during the 1920s for production in Japan.

== Development ==
It was intended to provide a spotter aircraft for warships, to take off from a short ramp since shipboard catapults had not yet been developed by the Japanese. The HD 25 was a conventional biplane with staggered wings and twin pontoon undercarriage. The pilot and observer sat in tandem, open cockpits. A single example of a modified demilitarised version was built by Aichi as the AB-1, and three surplus Type 2 Two-seat Reconnaissance Seaplanes were converted with two seat cabins aft of the open rear cockpit, to seat three passengers, for use by the Kouchi Shimbun newspaper.

== Operational history ==
Two prototypes were built by Heinkel in Germany, with the first flying in 1926. Following trials, the Navy officially accepted the type in March 1928 and gave it the designation Type 2 Two-seat Reconnaissance Seaplane. 16 were built by Aichi and saw brief service aboard the cruisers of the Imperial Japanese Navy.

== Variants ==
Heinkel HD 25
Heinkel Doppeldecker 25, two prototypes designed and built in Germany.
Heinkel Large Reconnaissance Seaplane
Unofficial designation for the Heinkel built prototypes
Heinkel-Type Warship Seaplane
Initial unofficial designation for the Aichi produced aircraft
Aichi Type 2 Two-seat Reconnaissance Seaplane
Production aircraft built by Aichi in Japan with modifications to allow operations from turret platforms
Aichi Type 2 Transport
Conversions of three surplus Type 2 Two-seat Reconnaissance Seaplanes with cabins seating three passengers, used by the Kouchi Shimbun newspaper.
Aichi AB-1
A single aircraft redesigned for a competition by the Japanese Aviation Bureau of the Department of Communications for a locally developed transport. Modifications included increased dimensions overall, N-type interplane struts, a four seat enclosed cabin forward of the two open cockpits and a 450 hp (340 kW) Nakajima-Lorraine 12Eb W-12 engine.

== Specifications (Aichi-built Type 2 Two-seat Reconnaissance Seaplane) ==
General characteristics

- Crew: Two, pilot and observer
- Length: 9.70 m (31 ft 10 in)
- Wingspan: 14.88 m (48 ft 10 in)
- Height: 4.27 m (14 ft 0 in)
- Empty weight: 1,700 kg (3,750 lb)
- Gross weight: 2,570 kg (5,650 lb)
- Powerplant: 1 × Napier Lion , 334 kW (450 hp)

Performance

- Maximum speed: 203 km/h (127 mph, 110 kn)
- Range: 910 km (570 mi, 500 nmi)
- Rate of climb: 3.3 m/s (645 ft/min)

Armament

- 1 × flexible rearward-firing 7.7 mm (0.303 in) machine gun for observer
- 300 kg (660 lb) of bombs

== See also ==
Related lists

- List of seaplanes
