= Japanese 32 cm torpedo =

Japanese weapon used by ships, submarines, and aircraft

Multiple 32 cm (12.75-inch, 323 mm) torpedoes are in use by the Japan Maritime Self-Defense Force, following the adoption of the standard in the second half of the 20th century.

Torpedoes of 12.75-inch caliber are used extensively by NATO and SEATO forces. The 12.75 inch standard for light ASW torpedoes was originally defined by the dimensions of the Mark 46 torpedo. These are usually dedicated lightweight ASW weapons, frequently utilizing a two-stage delivery system such as being dropped from aircraft or launched using VLS rocket boosters. In Japan, the 32 cm torpedo class is referred to as "tan gyorai" (短魚雷), "short torpedo".

Japan uses metric units to designate their torpedo calibers. As such, the 12.75-inch torpedoes are designated as 32 cm torpedoes, or more precisely, 324 mm. The other major size category in present use is the 53 cm (21-inch).

The Japanese type designation scheme has mostly used three different approaches. Units designed prior to the end of the Second World War were designated by either the regnal era year or the imperial year. In 1873, the Gregorian calendar was introduced in Japan; during the latter half of the 20th century, Japan increasingly switched to using this system, and as such, more recent torpedoes have type designations denoting Gregorian years. As an example of all three systems, a torpedo accepted for service in 1980 could potentially be called either a Type 54 (Showa Era year 54), a Type 40 (Imperial Year 2640), or a Type 80 (Gregorian year 1980). Modern torpedoes either use Gregorian dates, or arbitrary numbers for their designations.

After the Second World War, Japan imported American torpedoes. These included the Mark 14, Mark 23, Mark 32, Mark 34, Mark 37, Mark 44, and Mark 46. Additionally, US Navy rocket-boosted torpedo systems were imported, such as the ASROC and VL-ASROC. This page presently only lists weapons which were indigenously produced in Japan, including both original designs and locally manufactured foreign designs. Due to their exclusive association with antisubmarine warfare and torpedoes mentioned on this page, effectively altering the functionality of said torpedoes, rocket-assisted torpedo launch systems are also mentioned.

== Mark 44 ==
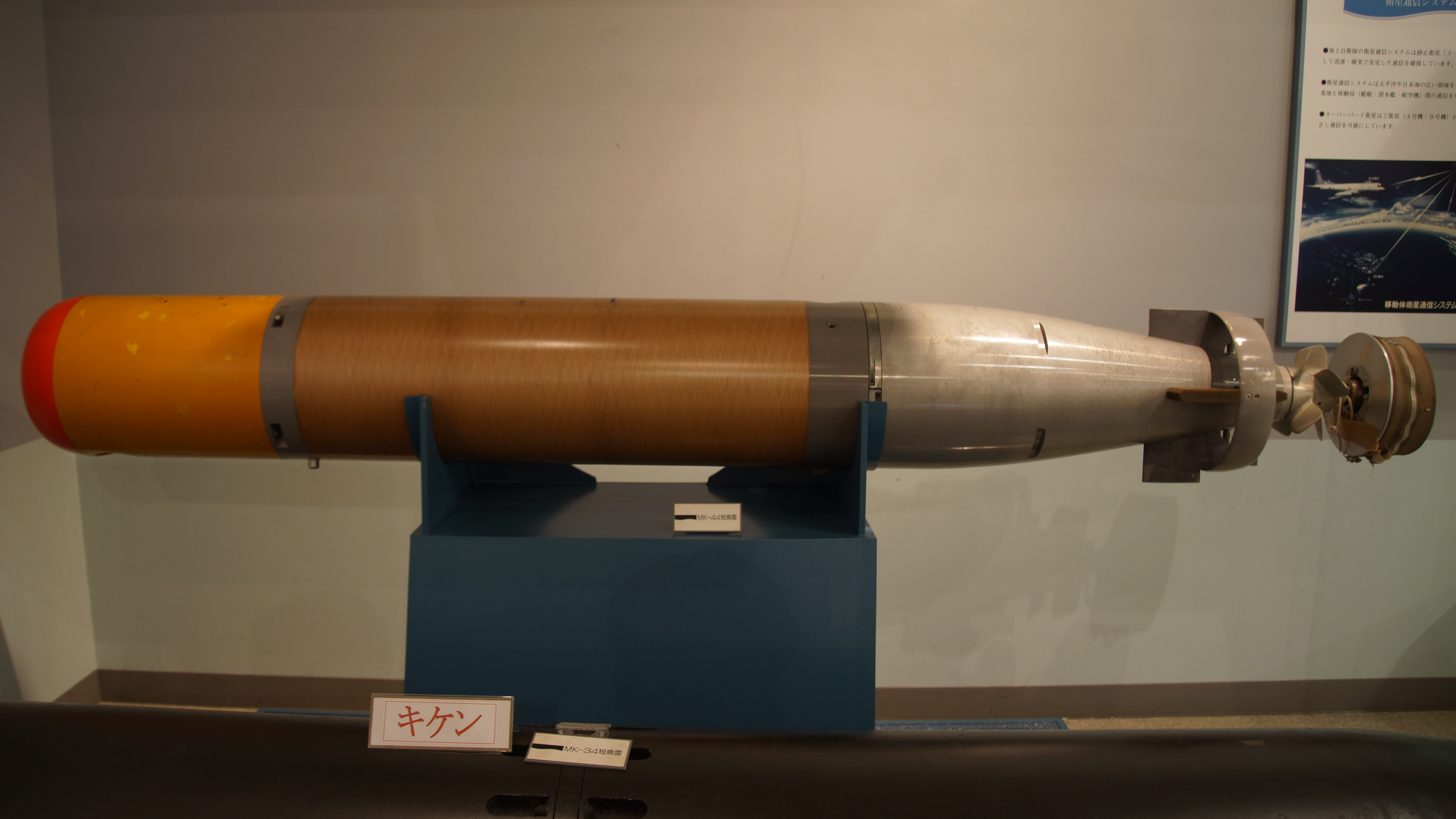
A Japanese-built Mark 44 torpedo in the Kanoya Air Base Museum.

Main article: Mark 44 torpedo (ja)

Designed 1953, in service 1957 (USA). In Japanese service 1961, initially imported. The Mark 44 Mod 1 was manufactured in Japan beginning in 1964, locally designated as the Mark 44-1-N. A ubiquitous acoustic homing ASW torpedo for NATO-aligned forces, originally deployed by the US Navy. Due to its progressively lackluster performance against fast, deep-diving nuclear-powered submarines of the 1960s and beyond, it was phased out of American service in 1967 and Japanese service in 1973. The New Zealand navy continued using the Mark 44 until 1993. Being a dedicated ASW weapon, the torpedo had a minimal depth setting of 50 feet (15 meters) to prevent targeting friendly surface vessels.

Specifications:

- Entered service: 1957 (USA), 1963 (Japan)
- Propulsion: Electric (silver chloride-magnesium-seawater fuel cell)
- Weight: 196 kg (432 lb)
- Length: 2.50 m (8.2 ft)
- Explosive charge: 34 kg (75 lb) HBX-3
- Range and speed: 5,500 m (3.0 nmi) at 30 kn (56 km/h)
- Maximum depth: 305 m (1,001 ft) (Mod 1), 910 m (2,990 ft) (Mod 4)

== Type 73 ==
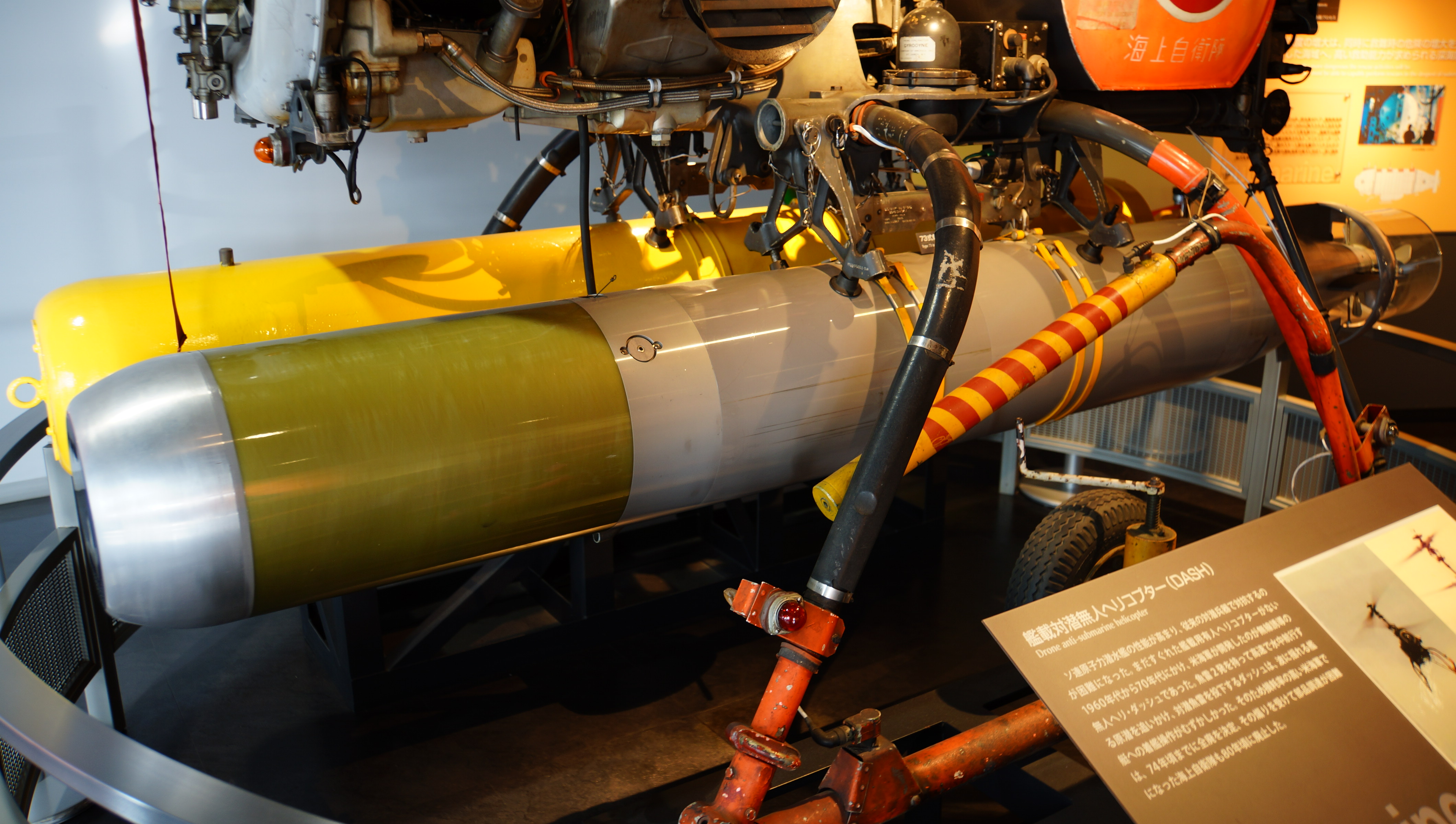
A Type 73 torpedo in the JMSDF Kure Museum, mounted on a QH-50 DASH helicopter drone.

Main article: Type 73 torpedo (ja)

Development commenced 1960, and the requirements were modified several times during the development cycle. The original project was classified as G-9, and in 1969, the final project was different enough to be classified as G-9B. Adopted 1973. During the 1960s, the Soviet Union was rapidly deploying nuclear-powered submarines which actually exceeded the speeds of important mainstay USN ASW torpedoes such as the Mark 44 (30 knots) and Mark 37 (26 knots); for example, the November class could reach 31 knots. This problem was the reason the United States Navy introduced the Mark 46 torpedo in 1966, to supersede the Mark 44. Japan, in turn, worked on their own improved light torpedo for this same role; since the Mark 44 had been accepted not only as a standalone torpedo but also as a payload for the ASROC missile system and the QH-50 DASH, the new torpedo was required to have approximately the same external dimensions and mass. From 1962, prototyping and testing commenced; during 1965–1966, field tests of the G-9 were performed. The results were deemed insufficient, and the torpedo was re-engineered during 1967–1968 as the G-9B. Field tests undertaken during 1970-1972 were satisfactory, and the torpedo was adopted for service the following year.

Following the 1981 proposal to lift the ban on exports of the Mark 46 torpedo, production of the Type 73 was halted since it had no anti-countermeasure features, and was thereby deemed inferior. The design of the anti-countermeasure guidance system was not disclosed to Japan, and following testing of the Mark 46, it was decided to replicate its functionality in the Type 73 through testing and observation of the Mark 46. As a result, in 1984, the Type 73 underwent a modernization program, with upgraded versions being designated as Type 73B.

The Type 73 remained in active service until 2011. All remaining units were scrapped by the end of 2012. The QH-60 DASH drone which was used by Japan for Type 73 delivery was first decommissioned in US Navy service in 1969 due to frequent accidents, and then gradually in Japanese service over a period spanning from 1979 to 1982, due to replacement parts running out. Facilities for its launch would be replaced by other systems, such as ASROC launchers, on warships like the Minegumo class.

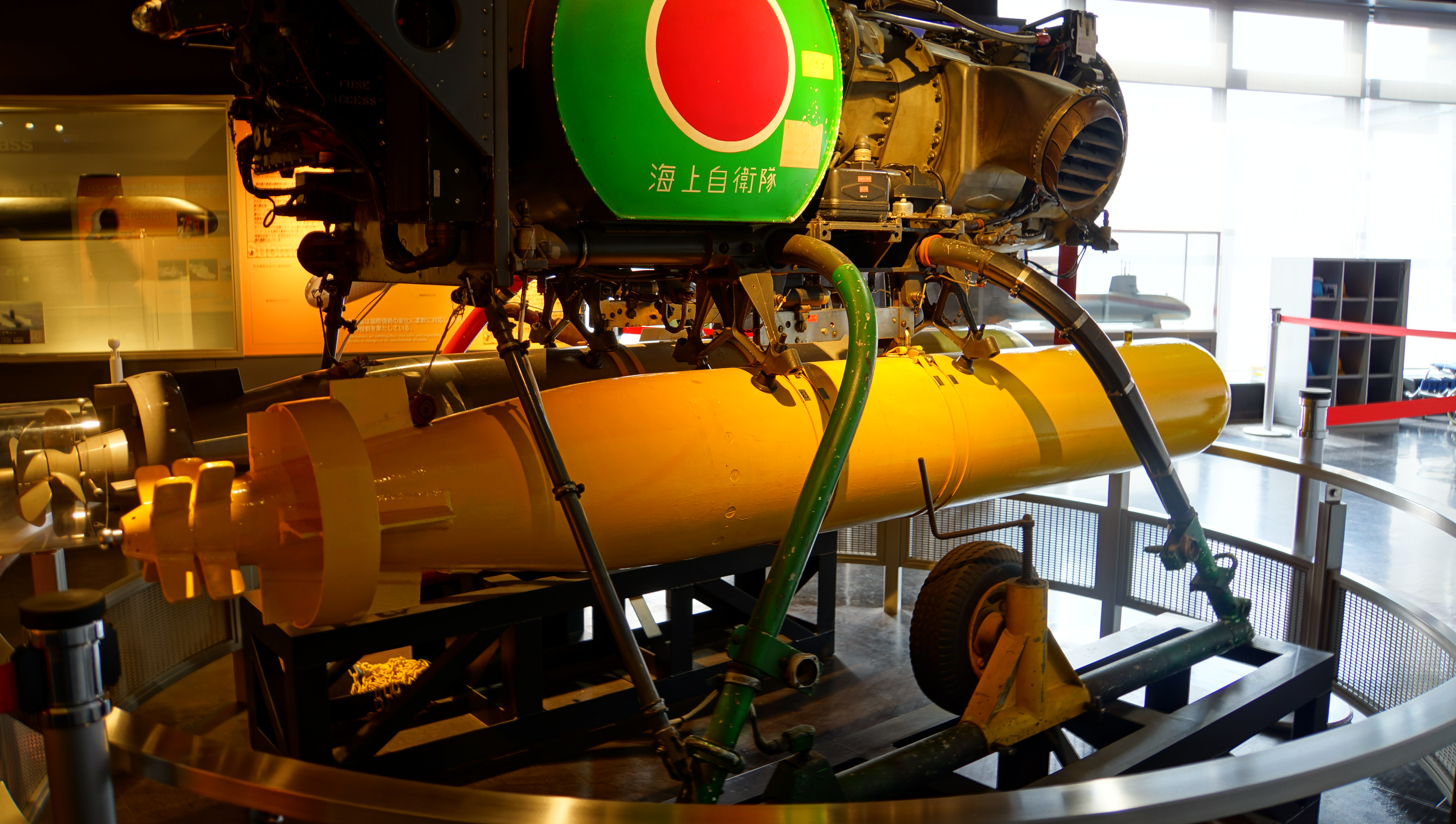
Rear view of the Type 73.

Specifications:

- Entered service: 1973 (Type 73), 1984 (Type 73B)
- Propulsion: Electric (silver chloride-magnesium-seawater fuel cell)
- Weight: 230 kg (510 lb)
- Length: 2.50 m (8.2 ft)
- Explosive charge: 40 kg (88 lb) HBX-3
- Range and speed: 6,000 m (3.2 nmi) at >35 kn (65 km/h)
- Maximum depth: >450 m (1,480 ft); likely deeper than 900 m (3,000 ft)

== Mark 46 ==
Main article: Mark 46 torpedo (ja)

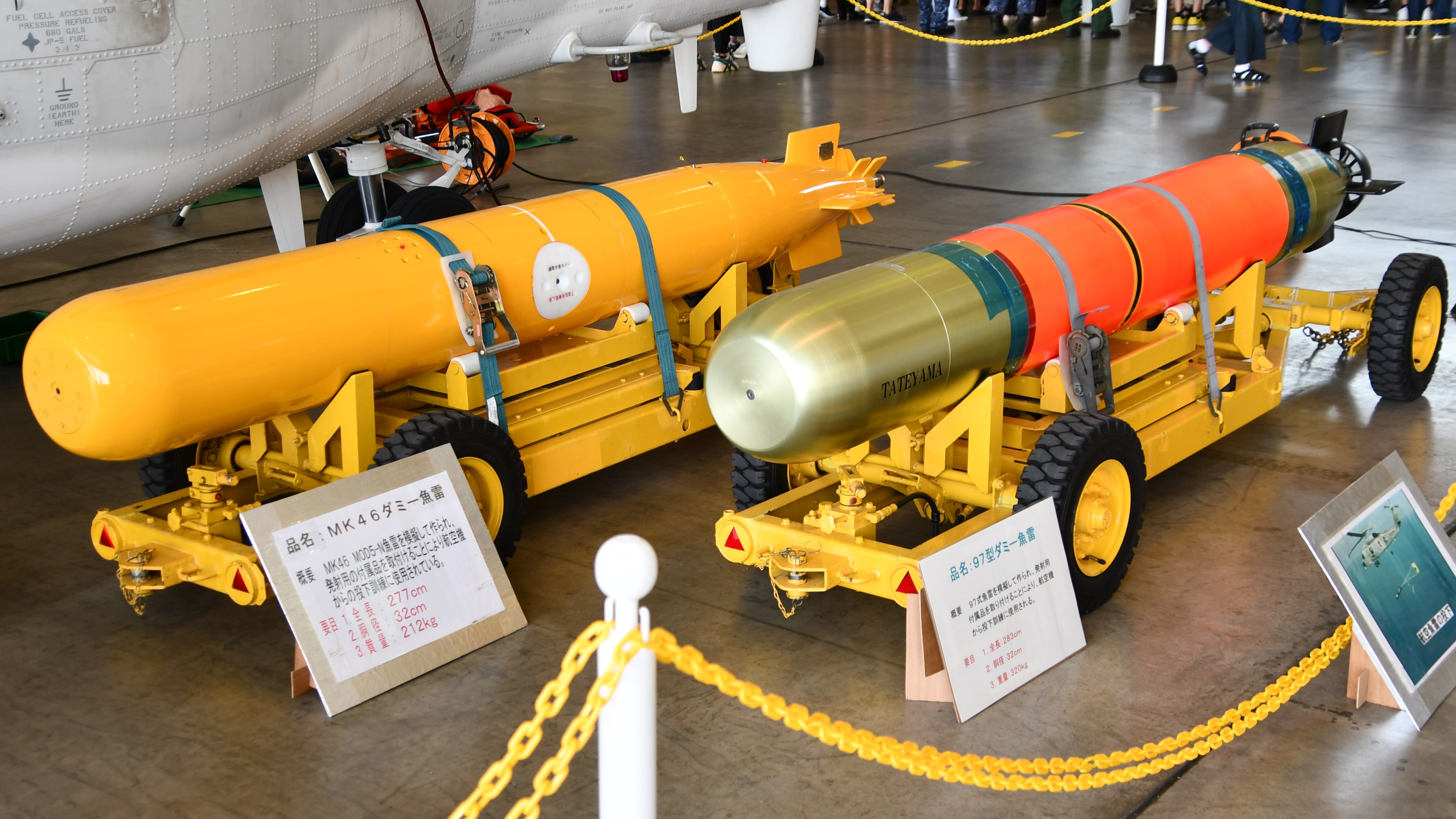
A Mark 46 dummy torpedo (left) exhibited alongside a Type 97 torpedo (right) at Tateyama Air Base.

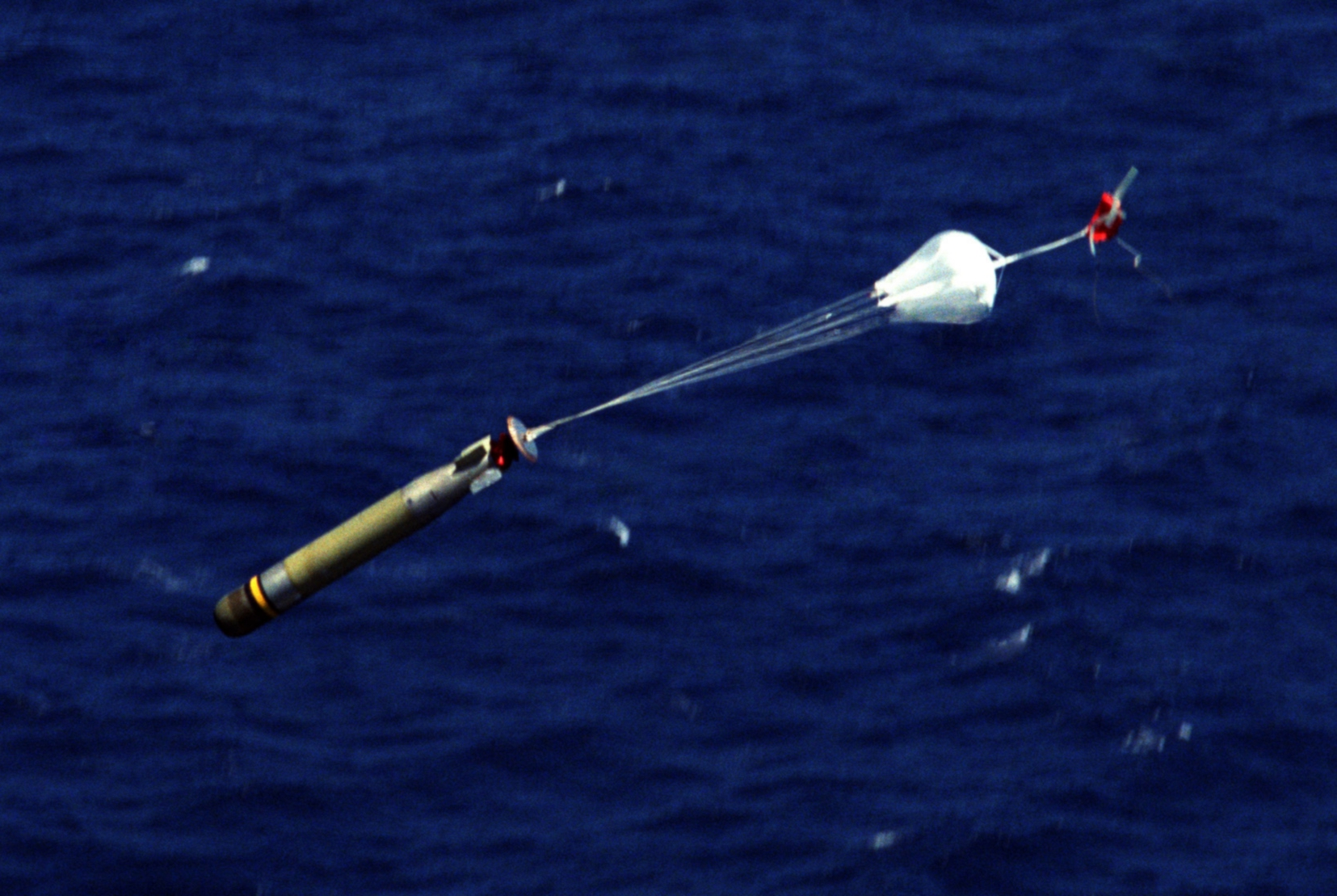
Drop of a Mark 46 torpedo from a Sikorsky SH-3H during an exercise in 1987.

Designed 1960, first deliveries and field testing in 1963, in service 1966 (USA). Initially available in Japan in 1981 (Mark 46 Mod 2), officially in Japanese service in 1984 (initially Mark 46 Mod 2, soon thereafter followed by Mod 5). A ubiquitous acoustic homing ASW torpedo for NATO-aligned forces, which is still in active service as of 2024. In Japan, unofficially nicknamed "血の狩人" ("chi no kariyudo"), "Bloodhound". The torpedo had multiple generations which greatly improved its capabilities. The present entry mostly concerns Mod 5. In 1981, the United States government made overtures to approve the sale of the Mark 46 to allies, in order to deter the Soviet submarine threat. Manufactured in Japan initially using knock-down kits in 1981 (Mark 46 Mod 2), followed by licensed coproduction by Mitsubishi Heavy Industries approved in July 1982. The Mark 46 is a medium-range ASW weapon possessing passive and active sonar, advanced computerized guidance which allows it to avoid false targets and acoustic countermeasures, and a variety of search settings. The earlier generations of the torpedo had a minimal depth setting of 50 ft (15 m) to prevent targeting friendly surface vessels. Mod 5 and subsequent developments removed this limitation. When launched in directional search mode, such as from a surface vessel or (optionally) from a stationary helicopter, the weapon travels in a snake search pattern with a range of approximately 4 nmi (7.4 km). The launching entity can specify certain aspects of the weapon's behavior, such as when it activates its active sonar, and its initial behavior after launch. When launched in circular search mode, such as from a helicopter or fixed-wing aircraft, or as an ASROC payload, the weapon travels in a circle with a diameter of approximately 1,000 yd (910 m), gradually increasing its depth. This spiral search begins when the weapon is at a depth of 38 meters and ends at a depth of 450 meters.

Specifications:

- Entered service: 1966 (Mod 0, USA), 1984 (Mod 5, Japan)
- Propulsion: Swashplate monopropellant Otto Fuel II
- Weight: 234.8 kg (518 lb)
- Length: 2.60 m (8.5 ft)
- Explosive charge: 45 kg (99 lb) PBXN-103
- Range and speed: 11,000 m (5.9 nmi) at 45 kn (83 km/h)
- Maximum depth: 750 m (2,460 ft) (Mod 2); likely deeper than 1,000 m (3,300 ft) (Mod 5), specifications remain classified
- Notes: Tens of thousands of units in commission worldwide, as of 2024. One of the most prolific torpedoes in history.

== Type 97 ==
Main article: Type 97 light weight torpedo (ja)

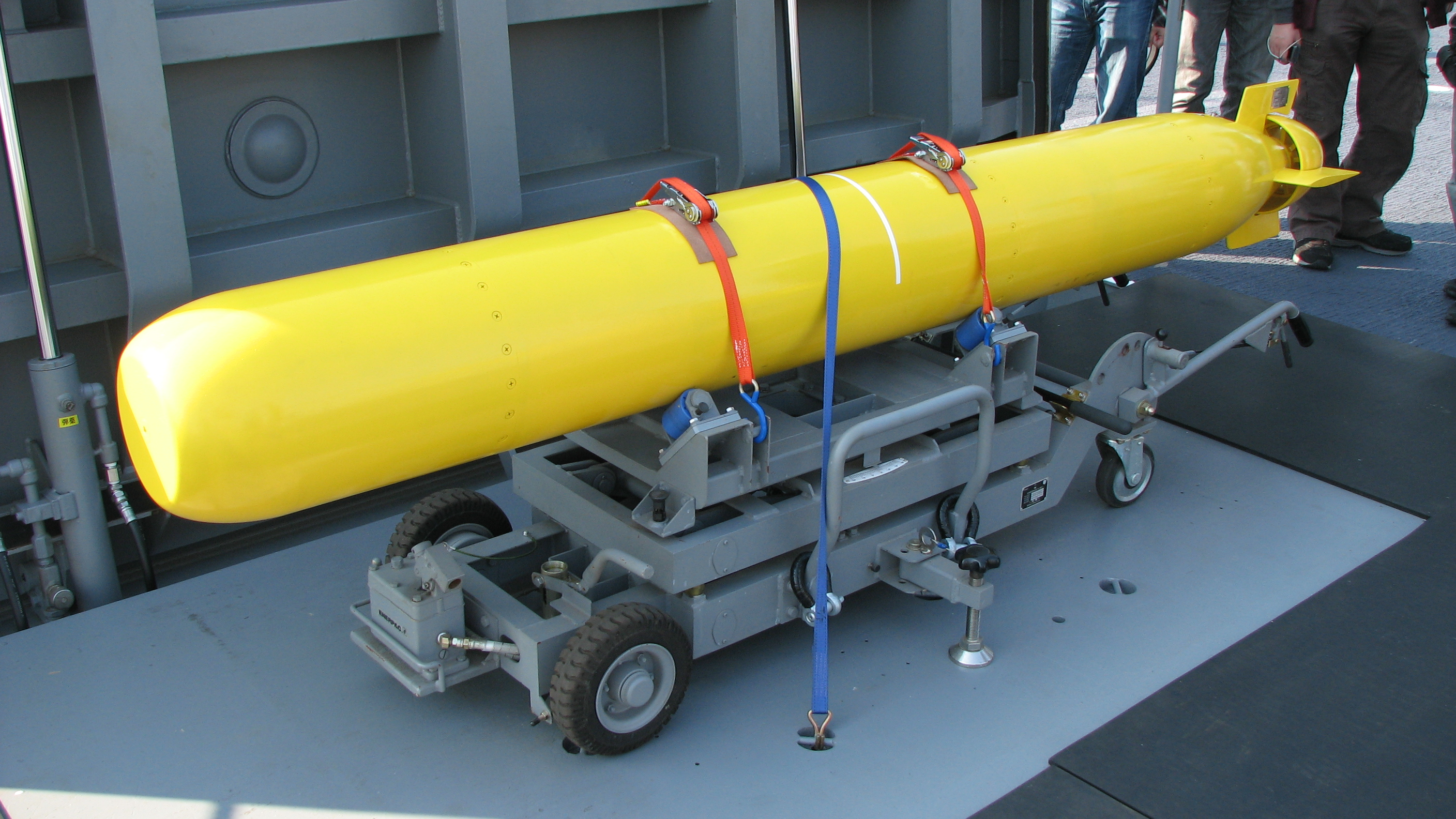
A Type 97 torpedo. The yellow color scheme designates the depicted unit as a training dummy.

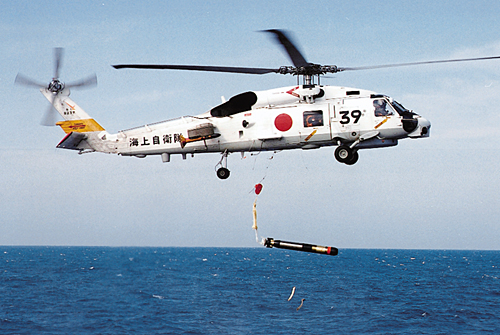
Drop of a Type 97 torpedo from a Mitsubishi H-60 helicopter during a training exercise in 2000.

Between 1973 and 1984, the Japanese Ministry of Defense's Technical Research and Development Institute (TRDI) (ja) had been working on an improved medium-range ASW torpedo, codenamed G-RX3. Work on the G-RX3 had been halted once the Mark 46 Mod 5 became available. During this time the Soviet submarine threat continued to exacerbate. Assessments of submarines such as the Alfa, Mike, and Typhoon were troubling. The Typhoon in particular had an enormous size and double-hulled construction with large spacing between the inner and outer hulls. Contemporary ASW weapons like the Mark 46 and Type 73 were assessed as lacking the speed, diving depth, and lethality to attack these submarines. In 1985, tentative work began on a further improved torpedo, using the G-RX3 project as the baseline foundation. This project was codenamed G-RX4, with the development contract being awarded to Mitsubishi Heavy Industries in 1987, and in 1989 prototyping began. In 1994, a live fire test was performed for the first time, with trials proceeding until 1996, and the weapon was adopted in 1997. The seeker head uses a 32-bit microprocessor and is capable of recognizing different acoustic profiles. The firmware is programmed using the Ada programming language. The weapon is equipped with a shaped charge warhead, designed to deeply lance into its target upon detonation; the torpedo's guidance system is designed to ensure that the torpedo hits its target at right angles. Used on surface ships and aircraft designated for the ASW role, such as Hyuga-class carriers in both the rocket-launched and helicopter-delivered applications, SH-60K helicopters, Lockheed P-3C, and Kawasaki P-1 patrol aircraft. The Type 97 is compatible with all warships equipped with Mark 32 torpedo tubes commonly used to launch the Mark 46. It is also used as a payload for the Type 07 VLS.

The newer Type 12 torpedo is based on the Type 97 torpedo body and shares numerous elements of its construction. Thus, as of 2024, the Type 97 is being gradually decommissioned, with parts being salvaged for production of new Type 12 units.

Specifications:

- Entered service: 1997
- Propulsion: Closed-cycle steam turbine (lithium-sulfur hexafluoride)
- Weight: 320 kg (710 lb)
- Length: 2.83 m (9.3 ft)
- Explosive charge: 50 kg (110 lb) PBX shaped charge
- Range and speed: 9,300 to 13,000 m (5.0 to 7.0 nmi) at <60 kn (110 km/h) (estimate only)
- Maximum depth: >1,000 m (3,300 ft); likely deeper than 1,500 m (4,900 ft), specifications remain classified
- Notes: Deliberately engineered to defeat the Mike class, among others; this suggests a maximum depth of at least 1500 meters.

== Type 12 ==
Main article: Type 12 torpedo (ja)

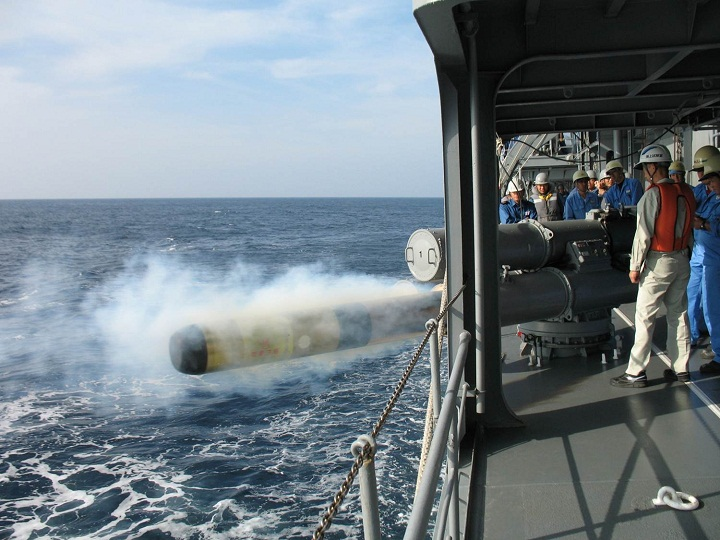
Test launch of a Type 12 torpedo from the JS Asuka during trials, in 2011.

Stemming from initial research on shallow-water ASW torpedoes in 1998–2003, the project which would become the Type 12 commenced in 2005, designated as G-RX5. Live fire trials were conducted in 2009. Adopted for service in 2012. Produced by Mitsubishi Heavy Industries. Improved variant of the Type 97 with an emphasis on ASW capabilities in littoral and shallow waters. Uses the same body, warhead, and propulsion system as the Type 97. The unit mass is also identical to the older torpedo, for integration into the same launch systems and missiles. The sensor array and guidance system of the weapon's seeker head are considerably improved. Side-scan sonar and magnetometric sensors for proximity detection of submarines and decoys have been added. Torpedo agility and maneuverability are also improved. The Type 12 has approximately 38% parts commonality with the Type 97; plans are in effect to use parts from decommissioned Type 97 units to construct new Type 12 units.

Specifications:

- Entered service: 2012
- Propulsion: Closed-cycle steam turbine (lithium-sulfur hexafluoride)
- Weight: 320 kg (710 lb)
- Length: 2.83 m (9.3 ft)
- Explosive charge: 50 kg (110 lb) PBX shaped charge
- Range and speed: 15,000 to 20,000 m (8.1 to 10.8 nmi) at 40 kn (74 km/h)
- Maximum depth: >1,000 m (3,300 ft); likely deeper than 1,500 m (4,900 ft), specifications remain classified
- Notes: Torpedo body and propulsion system are identical to Type 97 (interchangeable parts). Unit mass is deliberately identical to Type 97. Thus, the speed, endurance, and maximum depth are identical.

In 2023, a budget proposal was submitted to enhance the Type 12 with anti-torpedo torpedo (ATT) functionality. This was accepted for fiscal year 2024. The program's research and development phase is expected to run from 2024 to 2028, with prototype testing running from 2025 to 2029.

== RUR-5 ASROC ==
Main article: RUR-5 ASROC (ja)

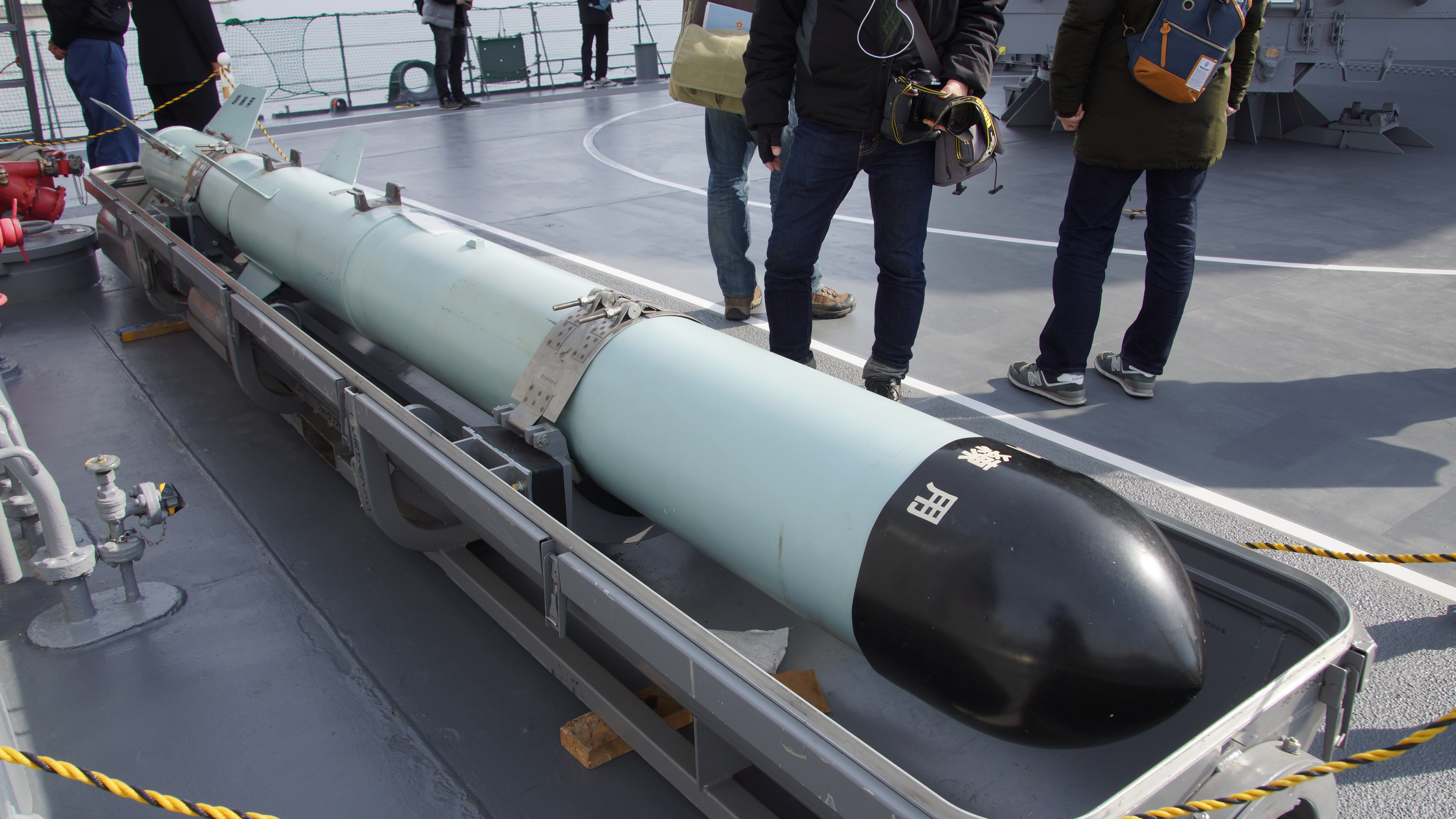
An inert RUR-5 ASROC missile exhibited on the JS Shimakaze at JMSDF Hanshin Naval Base.

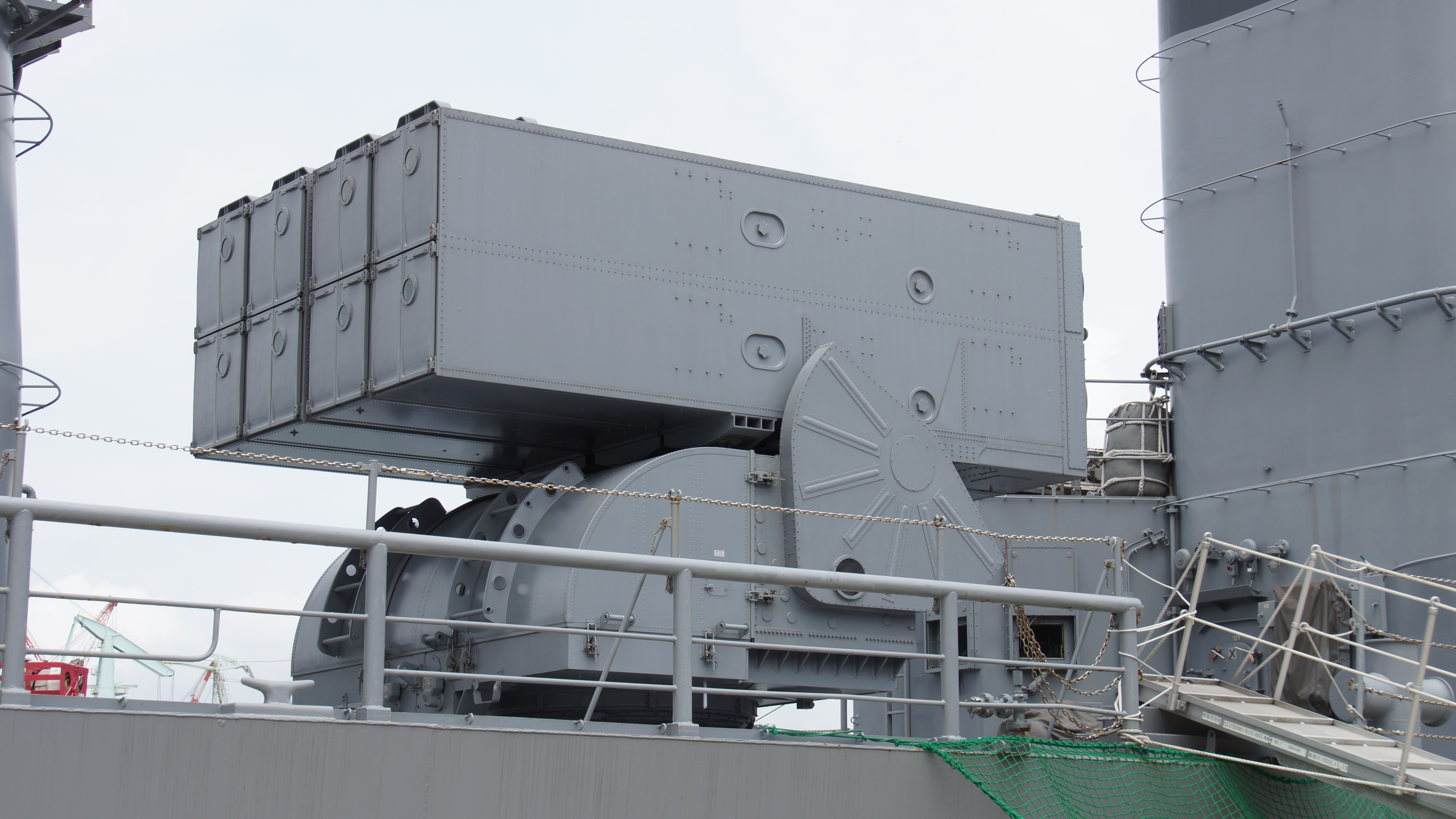
A Mk.112(J) MOD-2N ASROC launcher, mounted on JS Sendai.

Designed 1960, in service 1961 (USA). In Japanese service 1963. After 1974, ASROC hardware was fully manufactured in Japan under license, beginning with the Type 74 launcher produced by Mitsubishi Heavy Industries, its present-day iteration also referred to as Mk.112(J) MOD-2N. The first ships to receive the system were the Yamagumo class destroyers first commissioned in 1964. The system has been deployed on most Japanese destroyers, particularly the ones tasked with the ASW role. The ASROC (Anti-Submarine ROCket) was designed as a breakthrough weapons platform for medium-range ASW, with the ASW component being performed by a light torpedo delivered to the vicinity of an enemy submarine via a rocket.

In Japanese service, the ASROC system has been used to deliver the Mark 44, Mark 46, and Type 73 ASW torpedoes. The launch vehicles have the capability of being fitted with any of the other 32 cm torpedoes on this page, since all of them follow a compatible form factor standard.

In Japan, the system is simply referred to as "ASROC", a moniker which also includes the vertically launched variant. Following the example of US Navy parlance, the launcher component is unofficially nicknamed "マッチボックス" or "ペッパーボックス", "matchbox" or "pepperbox", due its design. Remains in active use as of 2024.

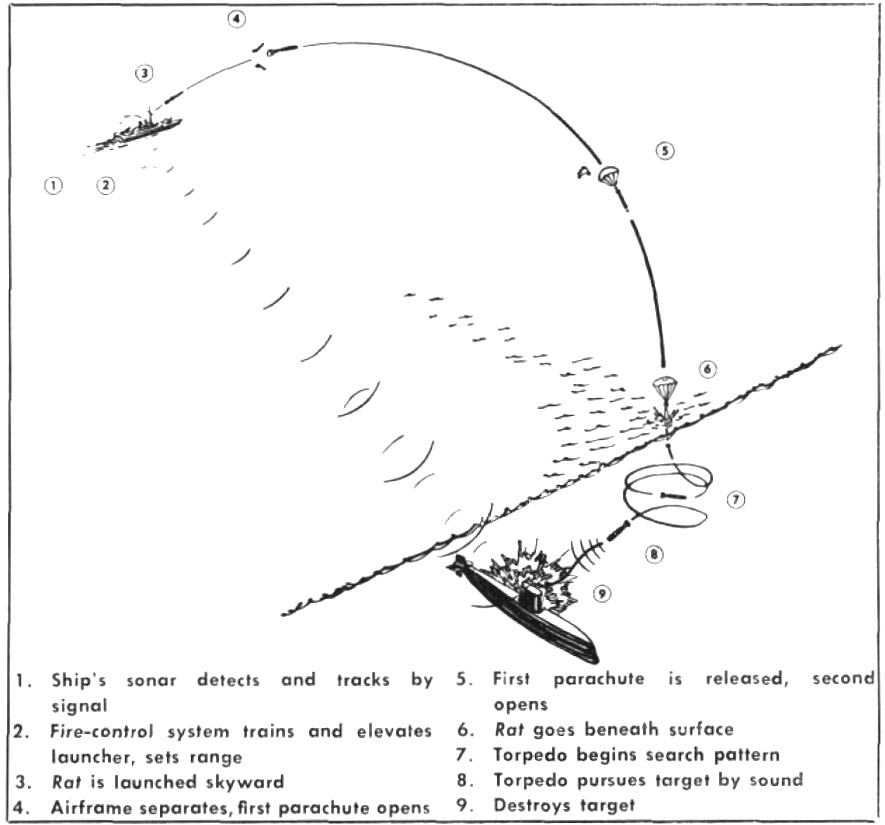
An illustration depicting the functional concept of the RAT (Rocket Assisted Torpedo) from All Hands magazine, April 1958.

ASROC launchers have been fitted to the Yamagumo, Takatsuki, Minegumo, Chikugo, Haruna, Tachikaze, Shirane, Hatsuyuki, Hatakaze, Asagiri, and Abukuma classes of destroyers.

Specifications:

- Entered service: 1961 (USA), 1963 (Japan)
- Propulsion: Solid-fueled rocket motor
- Weight: 486 kg (1,071 lb)
- Diameter: 34 cm (13 in)
- Finspan: 84 cm (33 in)
- Length: 4.50 m (14.8 ft)
- Speed: Mach 1
- Range: 820 m (2,690 ft) to 16 km (8.6 nmi)
- Notes: Range varies depending on the torpedo used as payload. The above figures reflect a Mark 46 payload.

== RUM-139 VL-ASROC ==
More advanced version of the earlier ASROC, designed to be launched from Mark 41 VLS. Used on multiple Japanese warships. Same standardized payload compartment as ASROC. Not presently manufactured in Japan. The associated Mark 41 VLS launchers are coproduced in Japan by Mitsubishi Heavy Industries.

Specifications:

- Entered service: 1993 (USA)
- Propulsion: Solid-fueled rocket motor
- Weight: 749 kg (1,651 lb)
- Diameter: 35.8 cm (14.1 in)
- Finspan: 68.3 cm (26.9 in)
- Length: 5.09 m (16.7 ft)
- Speed: Mach 1
- Range: 900 m (3,000 ft) to approximately 22 km (12 nmi), specifications remain classified
- Notes: Range varies depending on the torpedo used as payload. The above figures reflect a Mark 46 payload.

== Type 07 VLS ==
Main article: Type 07 VLS (ja)

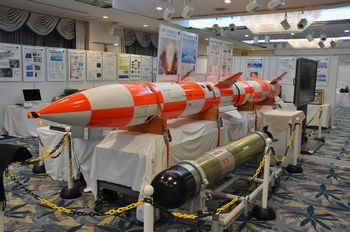
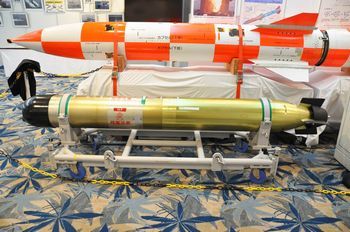
A Mark 46 torpedo and a Type 07 VLS missile, exhibited at the 2012 Defense Technology Symposium.

After an initial study beginning in 1991, developed by the Japanese Ministry of Defense's Technical Research and Development Institute (TRDI) (ja) beginning in 1999. In service 2007. The Type 07 is a long-range, vertically launched development of the ASROC concept. Analogous to the American RUM-139 VLA, with a heavier rocket booster comprising two stages, capable of longer-range launches. The second stage carries no propulsion, coasting on accumulated inertia from the first stage, and uses a drogue parachute to slow down below transonic speed before the torpedo is released and deploys its own parachute. Like the RUM-139, the Type 07 is compatible with Mark 41 VLS launchers. Development was motivated by the introduction of new, advanced sonar systems made available during the late Cold War. Unlike the RUM-139 VLA which uses a single parachute, two parachutes are used - a drogue which slows the second stage to below transonic speeds, and a parachute attached to the torpedo being used as the payload. The weapon was initially slated for deployment in 2005, but reliability problems stemming from drogue parachute deployment at supersonic speeds necessitated additional work. For payload, the Type 97 or Type 12 torpedoes are used. Due to the standardized form factor of 32 cm torpedoes, other torpedoes such as the Mark 46 could also hypothetically be used. When displayed at the 2012 Defense Technology Symposium, a Type 07 VLS missile was showcased as integrating the Mark 46. Produced by Mitsubishi Heavy Industries.

Type 07 missiles are deployed on the Hyuga class carriers, Akizuki, Asahi, Maya, Atago, Kongo, Murasame, Takanami classes of destroyers, Mogami class frigates and the Asuka experimental R&D warship.

Japan also employs the RUM-139 VLA, launched from the same Mark 41 VLS capable of launching the Type 07, deployed on the same ships listed above. The RUM-139 missiles are imported from the United States.

Specifications:

- Entered service: 2007
- Propulsion: Solid-fueled rocket motor
- Weight: 1,284 kg (2,831 lb)
- Diameter: 45 cm (18 in)
- Finspan: 69 cm (27 in)
- Length: 6.54 m (21.5 ft)
- Speed: Mach 1
- Range: >30 km (16 nmi), specifications remain classified
- Notes: Range varies depending on the torpedo used as payload. The above figures reflect a Type 97 payload.

== See also ==
- Japanese 45 cm torpedo
- Japanese 53 cm torpedo
- Japanese 61 cm torpedo
- List of torpedoes
