= Japanese 53 cm torpedo =

Japanese weapon used by ships, submarines, and aircraft

Numerous 53 cm (21-inch, 533 mm) torpedoes have been used by the Imperial Japanese Navy and its successor, the Japan Maritime Self-Defense Force, since their first development just before the First World War.

Torpedoes of 21-inch caliber are the primary size category used worldwide. In Japan, they are used by surface ships and submarines, and comprise the predominant majority of submarine torpedoes; historically, aircraft and midget submarines used smaller 45 cm torpedoes, and surface ships additionally used 61 cm torpedoes. Japan also employs 32 cm torpedoes which conform to the NATO 12.75-inch (323.8 mm) standard; these are dedicated ASW weapons, often delivered via aircraft. The 12.75 inch standard for light ASW torpedoes was originally defined by the dimensions of the Mark 46 torpedo.

Prior to 6 October 1917, imperial measurements were used. After this date, metric units were used. As such, the 21-inch torpedoes were designated as 53 cm torpedoes. Japanese torpedoes have usually conformed to the 45 cm (17.7-inch or 18-inch), the 53 cm (21-inch), and the 61 cm (24-inch) calibers.

The Japanese type designation scheme has mostly used three different approaches. Units designed prior to the end of the Second World War were designated by either the regnal era year or the imperial year. In 1873, the Gregorian calendar was introduced in Japan; during the latter half of the 20th century, Japan increasingly switched to using this system, and as such, more recent torpedoes have type designations denoting Gregorian years. As an example of all three systems, a torpedo designed or accepted for service in 1980 could potentially be called either a Type 55 (Showa Era year 55), a Type 40 (Imperial Year 2640), or a Type 80 (Gregorian year 1980).

During the Second World War, Japanese torpedoes were superb. Rigorous live-fire testing in real-world conditions resulted in highly reliable designs. The Japanese were more willing to conduct dangerous experiments, an attitude that was also reflected in their highly realistic fleet exercises. Japan also possessed the fastest torpedoes in the world, having persevered in their pursuit of using pure oxygen as the oxidizer instead of air, whereas other navies abandoned the idea.

After the Second World War, Japan imported American torpedoes. These included the Mark 14, Mark 23, Mark 32, Mark 34, Mark 37, Mark 44, and Mark 46. This page presently only lists torpedoes which were indigenously produced in Japan.

After a brief period of postwar stagnation in the field, the Japanese experienced a revival of torpedo development. During the 1970s, indigenous designs became globally competitive.

== Type 43 21-inch ==
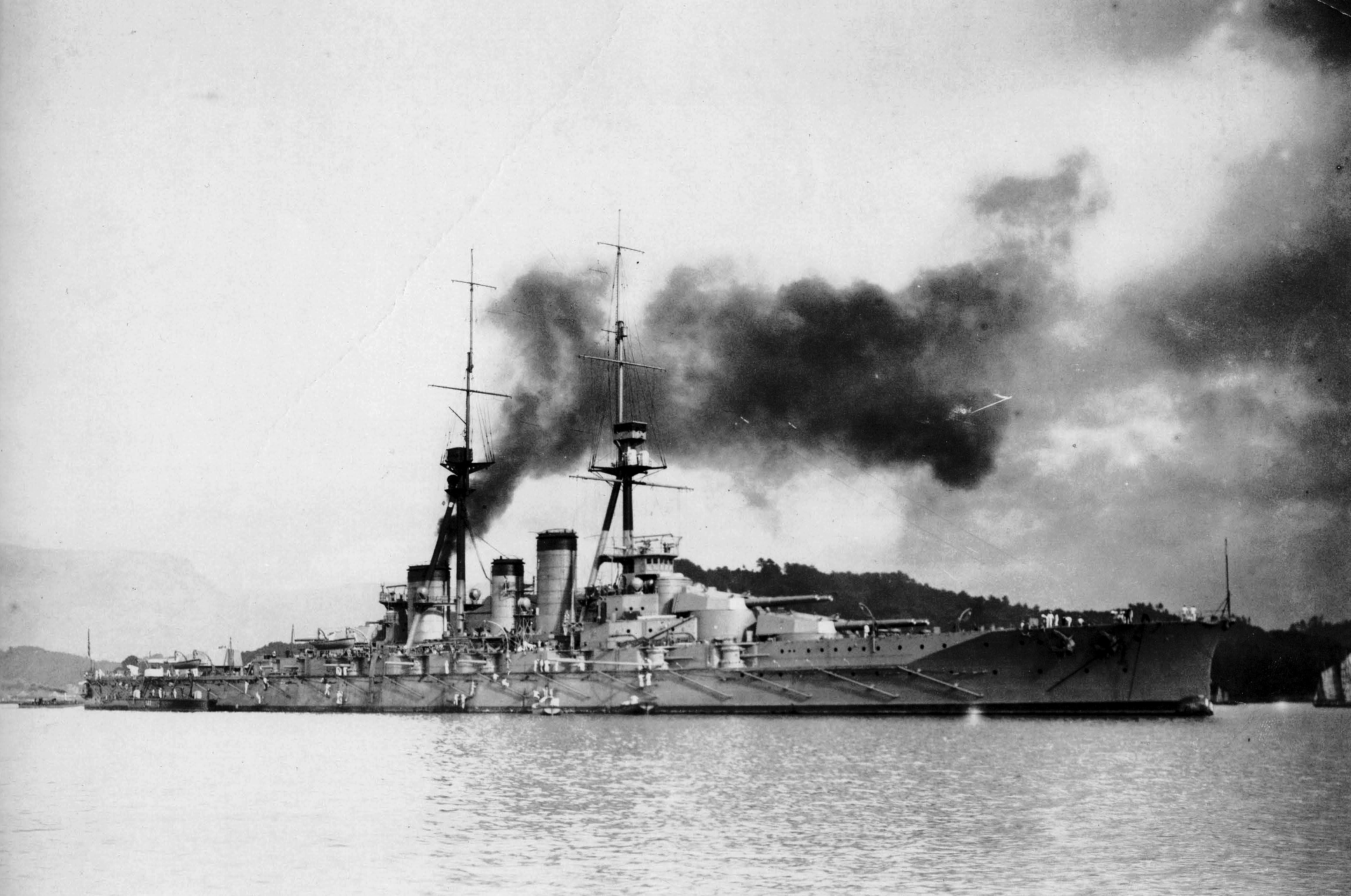
IJN battlecruiser Hiei at Sasebo, Japan, 1915. One of four Kongō-class battlecruisers which incorporated concealed 21-inch torpedo tubes below the waterline and carried the Type 43.

Upscaled version of the Type 43 18-inch torpedo. The Type 43 was based upon plans supplied by Whitehead (Whitehead Mark 5). Generally similar to the Type 38 No.2B and the Type 42, utilizing four-cylinder radial engines. The Type 43 was the only foreign torpedo design adopted for use with 21-inch torpedo tubes during the first half of the 20th century. Designed 1909, in service 1910. Used on surface ships.

Specifications:

- Entered service: 1910
- Propulsion: Dry heater
- Weight: 1,187 kg (2,617 lb)
- Length: 6.39 m (21.0 ft)
- Explosive charge: 150 kg (330 lb) Shimose
- Range and speed: 8,000 m (4.3 nmi) at 27 kn (50 km/h)

During the 1910s, the Japanese experimented with designs for 21-inch torpedoes. In July 1910, the first of such projects reached the prototype phase; the torpedo was propelled by a 50-horsepower Antoinette 8-cylinder engine with 105 mm (4.15 inch) cylinder bores. Interest was also expressed in the turbine-propelled Bliss–Leavitt Mark 8, with a prototype based on the Mark 8 being constructed. Ultimately, the first entirely indigenous 21-inch torpedo would be the Type 6, adopted in 1917.

== Type 44 21-inch ==
Based upon plans supplied by Whitehead (Whitehead Mark 5) and the Type 43. Designed 1910, in service 1911. Used on surface ships and submarines. This torpedo was the first type deployed on Japanese submarines, initially the F, L, and Kaichū types. The Type 44 torpedo series existed in both 18-inch and 21-inch calibers, each having a No.1 and a No.2 variant developed. The Type 44 was the first Japanese design to fully transition to steam for its wet heater cycle.

Concurrent with Type 44 development in 1910, internal combustion propulsion was also being tested for 21-inch torpedo propulsion. A prototype was constructed using a 50-horsepower, eight-cylinder Antoinette gasoline engine. Ultimately this effort was abandoned. Internal combustion propulsion would be tried again, a decade later, with the Type 12 project.

During the Second World War, the Type 44 was mostly relegated to old ships, coastal defense craft, and torpedo boats. The older Shimose filler was replaced with Type 97 or Type 98 explosive in any remaining units of the older versions.

Specifications:

Type 44 No.1 21-inch

- Entered service: 1911
- Propulsion: Wet heater
- Weight: 1,325 kg (2,921 lb)
- Length: 6.70 m (22.0 ft)
- Explosive charge: 110 kg (240 lb) Shimose
- Range and speed: 7,000 m (3.8 nmi) at 36 kn (67 km/h), 10,000 m (5.4 nmi) at 27 kn (50 km/h)

Type 44 No.2 21-inch

- Entered service: 1911
- Propulsion: Wet heater
- Weight: 1,293 kg (2,851 lb)
- Length: 6.70 m (22.0 ft)
- Explosive charge: 110 kg (240 lb) Shimose
- Range and speed: 7,000 m (3.8 nmi) at 36 kn (67 km/h), 10,000 m (5.4 nmi) at 27 kn (50 km/h)

Type 44 Late

- Entered service: Unknown, likely 1939~1942
- Propulsion: Wet heater
- Weight: 1,430 kg (3,150 lb)
- Length: 7.25 m (23.8 ft)
- Explosive charge: 200 kg (440 lb) Type 97 or Type 98
- Range and speed: 7,000 m (3.8 nmi) at 36 kn (67 km/h), 10,000 m (5.4 nmi) at 27 kn (50 km/h)
- Note: Retrofitted older torpedoes, refurbished for use by auxiliary surface vessels during WWII

== Type 6 ==
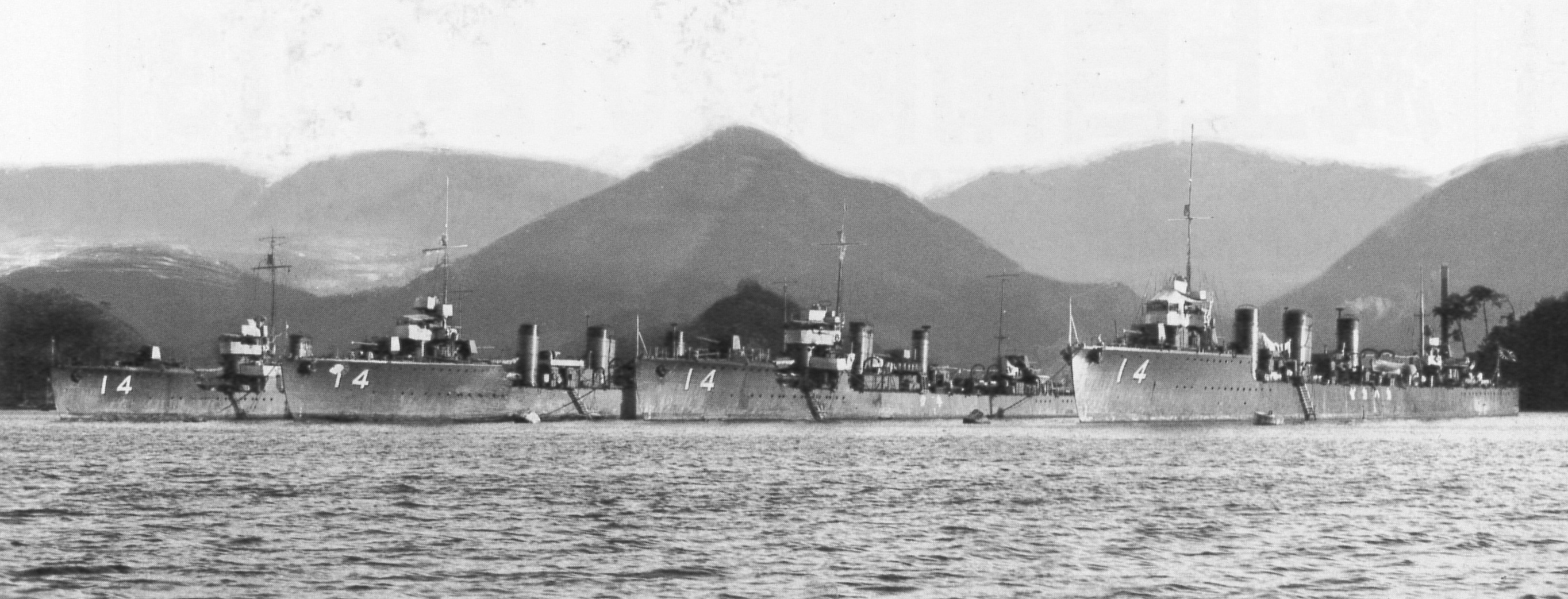
IJN destroyers of the 14th Destroyer Group at anchor, 1926. Depicted are Momi and Kawakaze-class destroyers, both of which were armed with Type 6 torpedoes.

The first type classified using metric measurements. Also referred to as the 6th Year Type in literature, referring to Taisho Era year 6 (1917). The weapon was designed by the then-recently established Imperial Japanese Navy Technical Department, which favored the regnal era naming scheme. Design work commenced in 1914 and was completed in 1917; in service 1918. Used on surface ships and submarines. In the aftermath of the Russo-Japanese War, Japan pursued a tentative Eight-Eight Program, which stipulated the necessity for eight modern battleships of at least 20,000 tons displacement and eight modern battlecruisers of at least 18,000 tons displacement. These ships would be armed with new, increasingly powerful armaments, including torpedoes of 21-inch caliber, as opposed to the 18-inch standard common during the war. The torpedoes designed for this program were the Type 6, soon to be followed by the 61 cm (24-inch) Type 8. Alongside the new design, the decision was made to switch to metric units for all present and future torpedo programs. In 1922, the Washington Naval Treaty was signed, and the large new torpedoes were reassigned to new designs of cruisers and destroyers. In this way, the 53 cm torpedo caliber became increasingly significant.

Specifications:

- Entered service: 1918
- Propulsion: Wet heater
- Weight: 1,432 kg (3,157 lb)
- Length: 6.84 m (22.4 ft)
- Explosive charge: 203 kg (448 lb) Shimose
- Range and speed: 7,650 m (4.13 nmi) at 36 kn (67 km/h), 10,000 m (5.4 nmi) at 32 kn (59 km/h), 15,000 m (8.1 nmi) at 26 kn (48 km/h)

== Type 89 ==
Designed 1929, in service 1931. Initially used on submarines. The Type 89 replaced the Type 6 in the Junsen and Kaidai-type submarines after its adoption, and remained in service until being retired in 1942. Propulsion was with a two-cylinder, double-acting engine. Common during the Second World War as an older and less expensive alternative to the Type 95, especially during the first half of the war. Later during the war, the weapon was additionally assigned to various surface warships such as destroyers, torpedo boats, and training vessels, with the warheads fitted to the Type 89 being of a non-standard type. Alternative fillers for such units included 283.5 kg (625 lb) of Shimose and 300 kg (660 lb) of either Type 94 or Type 97. For this torpedo, the type designation refers to Imperial Year 2589. The type designation 89 was reused in 1989, referring to the Gregorian year.

Specifications:

Type 89

- Entered service: 1931 (earliest examples 1929)
- Propulsion: Wet heater (kerosene-air)
- Weight: 1,666 kg (3,673 lb)
- Length: 7.21 m (23.7 ft)
- Explosive charge: 295 kg (650 lb) Type 91
- Range and speed: 5,500 m (3.0 nmi) at 45 kn (83 km/h), 6,000 m (3.2 nmi) at 43 kn (80 km/h), 11,000 m (5.9 nmi) at 36 kn (67 km/h)

Type 89 Mod 1

- Entered service: 1931
- Propulsion: Wet heater (kerosene-air)
- Weight: 1,625 kg (3,583 lb)
- Length: 7.16 m (23.5 ft)
- Explosive charge: 295 kg (650 lb) Type 91
- Range and speed: 6,000 m (3.2 nmi) at 45 kn (83 km/h), 6,200 m (3.3 nmi) at 43 kn (80 km/h), 11,000 m (5.9 nmi) at 36 kn (67 km/h)

Type 89 Mod 2

- Entered service: 1939
- Propulsion: Wet heater (kerosene-air)
- Weight: 1,668 kg (3,677 lb)
- Length: 7.16 m (23.5 ft)
- Explosive charge: 300 kg (660 lb) Type 97
- Range and speed: 5,500 m (3.0 nmi) at 45 kn (83 km/h), 6,000 m (3.2 nmi) at 43 kn (80 km/h), 10,000 m (5.4 nmi) at 35 kn (65 km/h)

== Type 92 ==
Design work commenced 1921, completed 1925. Mod 1 was ready for production in 1934. Electric propulsion (lead-acid batteries). The Type 92 was the first of a series of sequentially-designated torpedo projects, classified as project A (甲, kou). The 1925 version submitted for trials had an endurance of 3,000 m (1.6 nmi) at 30 kn (56 km/h). Deemed unnecessary at the time due to peacetime considerations, and consequently not put into series production. Production of the Mod 1 began in 1941, in preparation for the onset of hostilities in the Pacific. Re-engineered in 1942 using elements of the German G7e torpedo design after ten samples of the G7e were delivered to Japan that year. This resulted in the Mod 2, production of which was started that year to supplement the high demand for the Type 95. The Type 92 was cheaper to produce than the Type 95. Used on submarines. In 1945, Mod 1 was selected to produce the Type 10 Kaiten, a piloted suicide weapon, following the American invasion of Okinawa and anticipated landings in Kyushu. The weapon was chosen for conversion due to a surplus existing in storage, as well as advantages like the absence of a surface bubble trail.

The Type 92 Mod 1 was also used to investigate the possibility of an acoustic homing system, the first of its kind in Japan. In his memoir, Captain Tameichi Hara mentions receiving homing torpedoes and training in their use in December 1944. There were two different types of homing Type 92 torpedoes, with only the first one, designated Mod 3 (variously referred to as Type 92 Mark 3 in at least one post-war report) seeing field deployment against live targets. The torpedo was fitted with two hydrophones at 30 degree angles to port and starboard, in carefully engineered metal cavities with seamless ebonite covers, in the warhead casing. These would be wired through amplifiers to a differential relay (discriminator) which governed a transducer module mated with the torpedo's rudder. The other design, project designation "NR", used a phase differential circuit, with carbon granule hydrophones likewise set flush with the torpedo body behind ebonite covers. A smaller warhead from the Type 91 was used, with the hydrophones mounted in a tapering module behind the warhead. The system was designed to be capable of seeking targets in three dimensions, usable for ASW, which may have been the first of its kind in the world. In practice, the system was too sensitive to self-noise, resulting in a lower acquisition range than the Mod 3 (approximately 100 meters against a target moving at 5 knots in typical circumstances, as opposed to 300 meters for the Mod 3); also, the seeker head was confounded by boundary layer reflection noise from the surface of the water above, which greatly complicated control in the vertical plane. Project "NR" may have been preceded by the abortive project "R" (聴音魚雷R金物, Choōn Gyorai R Kanamono, "Acoustic Torpedo R-Hardware"), which attempted to replicate a German passive acoustic homing torpedo obtained through a technology exchange with Germany.

Specifications:

Type 92 Mod 1

- Entered service: 1934
- Propulsion: Battery (lead-acid)
- Weight: 1,720 kg (3,790 lb)
- Length: 7.15 m (23.5 ft)
- Explosive charge: 330 kg (730 lb) Type 97
- Range and speed: 5,000 m (2.7 nmi) at 28 kn (52 km/h) (cold), 7,000 m (3.8 nmi) at 30 kn (56 km/h) (pre-warmed)

Type 92 Mod 2

- Entered service: 1942
- Propulsion: Battery (lead-acid)
- Weight: 1,528 kg (3,369 lb)
- Length: 7.21 m (23.7 ft)
- Explosive charge: 297 kg (655 lb) Type 1 Otsuyaku (Schießwolle 18)
- Range and speed: 3,000 m (1.6 nmi) at 28 kn (52 km/h) (cold), 5,000 m (2.7 nmi) at 30 kn (56 km/h) (pre-warmed)
- Notes: Hybrid design closely resembling a G7e, including a reverse-engineered German warhead. Lowest cost of production. Manufactured in small numbers due to a shortage of manpower.

Type 92 Mod 3

- Entered service: 1944
- Propulsion: Battery (lead-acid)
- Weight: 1,720 kg (3,790 lb)
- Length: 7.15 m (23.5 ft)
- Explosive charge: 330 kg (730 lb) Type 97
- Range and speed: 8,300 m (4.5 nmi) at 20 kn (37 km/h) (estimate)
- Notes: Passive acoustic homing in the horizontal plane. Speed deliberately limited to 20 knots to reduce self-noise. In 1945, experimental versions with extensive rubber sound insulation and switching to a two-bladed mono screw as opposed to a standard contra-rotating pair of screws increased surface vessel acquisition range to anywhere from 500 to 2000 meters.

Type 92 NR Prototype

- Prototype date: 1944
- Propulsion: Battery (lead-acid)
- Weight: 1,630 kg (3,590 lb)
- Length: 7.1 m (23 ft) (estimate)
- Explosive charge: 240 kg (530 lb) Type 97
- Range and speed: 8,500 m (4.6 nmi) at 20 kn (37 km/h) (estimate)
- Notes: Passive acoustic homing in three dimensions. Speed deliberately limited to 20 knots to reduce self-noise.

== Type 94 Mod 1 ==
Designed 1934, entered service 1938. Two variants existed, a Type 94 Mod 1 and a Type 94 Mod 2. The Type 94 Mod 1 was the 53 cm variant. Heavy kerosene-oxygen-seawater torpedo for aircraft use; not commonly deployed, it could be delivered by flying boats like the H6K and H8K. Manufacture of the Mod 1 was halted in 1941, with units left in storage, after flight handling problems with the H6K flying boat were observed. Ambient seawater, rather than an on-board supply, was pumped and injected into the combustion chamber in order to flash to steam. The design actually used oxygen-enriched air rather than pure oxygen as the oxidizer. Initially used on aircraft. The weapon was also compatible with submarine launch tubes, being relegated to submarine launch late in the war; according to at least one US ordnance publication, some late-war units also used obsolete Shimose warhead filler.

Specifications:

- Entered service: 1938
- Propulsion: Wet heater (kerosene-air, oxygen-enriched)
- Weight: 1,517 kg (3,344 lb)
- Length: 6.70 m (22.0 ft)
- Explosive charge: 393 kg (866 lb) Type 97
- Range and speed: 4,500 m (2.4 nmi) at 45 kn (83 km/h)
- Max airdrop speed: 145 kn (269 km/h)

== Type 95 ==
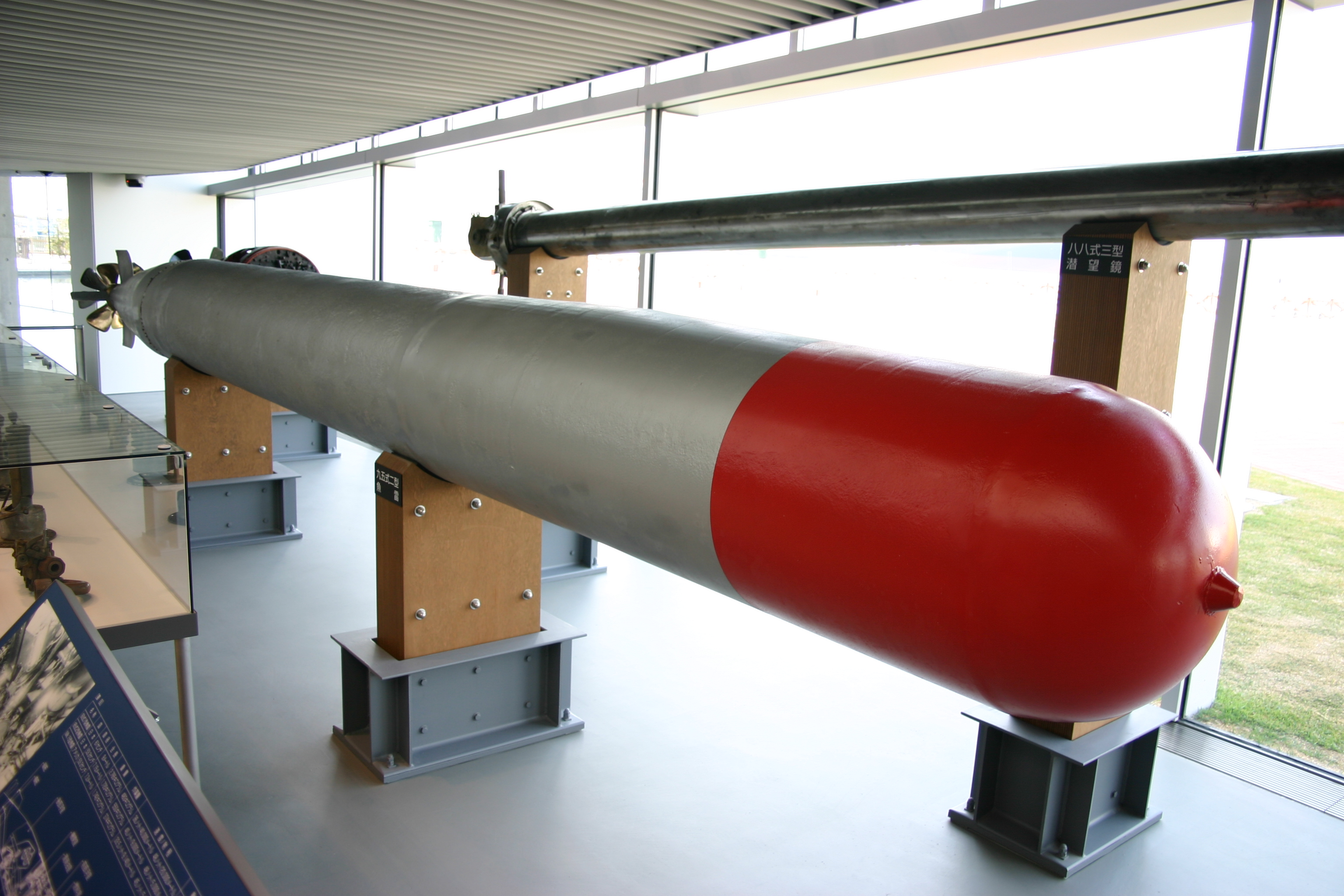
A Type 95 torpedo in the Yamato Museum.

Designed 1935, in service 1937. Smaller version of the Type 93 ("Long Lance") kerosene-oxygen torpedo. The two variants of the Type 95, especially the pre-war Mod 1, were ubiquitous as submarine armament during the Second World War. Intended to be the best weapons fielded by the fastest fleet submarines, such as the 23-knot Junsen A-Class and Kaidai VII Class. Using pure oxygen instead of air simultaneously made the torpedo's engine much more powerful and eliminated the formation of a bubble wake trail on the surface. The core concept for the use of Type 95 torpedoes was to defeat American warships transiting from Hawaii. Fleet exercises undertaken in 1939-1940, where this strategy was practiced, demonstrated the near impossibility of actually succeeding at this.

Mod 2 was a redesigned and improved version of the Mod 1 that traded some of its range for a much heavier explosive payload. Designed 1943, in service 1944. To address the hazardous nature of oxygen torpedoes and starting problems encountered by the Mod 1, the starting oxidizer was switched to a mixture of compressed air and tetrachloromethane. The nose cone of the torpedo had a more pointed design, influenced by the design of the Italian W 270/533.4 x 7.2 Veloce torpedo, samples of which were delivered to Japan during the Second World War. This nose cone design would be reused for several other torpedoes as well.

Specifications:

Type 95 Mod 1

- Entered service: 1937
- Propulsion: Wet heater (kerosene-oxygen)
- Weight: 1,665 kg (3,671 lb)
- Length: 7.15 m (23.5 ft)
- Explosive charge: 405 kg (893 lb) Type 97
- Range and speed: 9,000 m (4.9 nmi) at 49–51 kn (91–94 km/h), 12,000 m (6.5 nmi) at 45–47 kn (83–87 km/h)

Type 95 Mod 2

- Entered service: 1944
- Propulsion: Wet heater (kerosene-oxygen)
- Weight: 1,730 kg (3,810 lb)
- Length: 7.15 m (23.5 ft)
- Explosive charge: 550 kg (1,210 lb) Type 97
- Range and speed: 5,500 m (3.0 nmi) at 49–51 kn (91–94 km/h), 7,500 m (4.0 nmi) at 45–47 kn (83–87 km/h)

== Type 96 ==
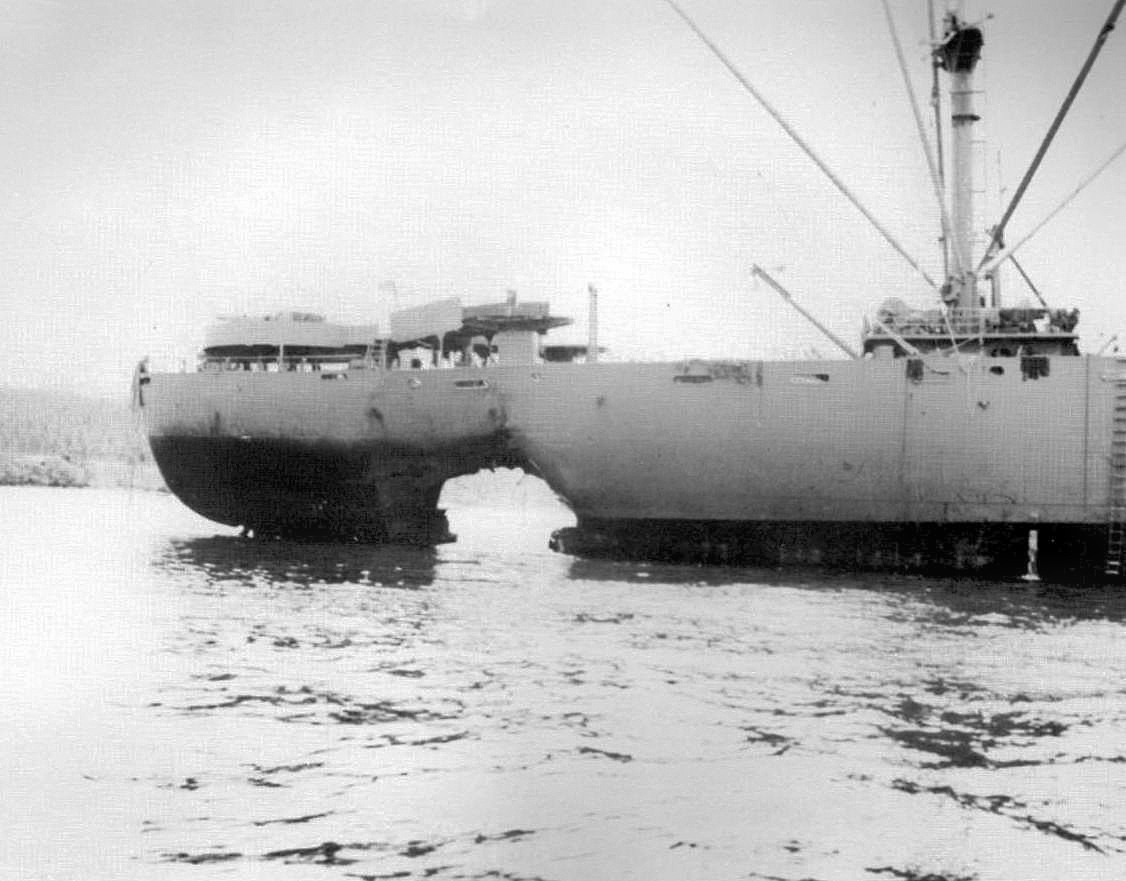
Damage from a Type 96 torpedo sustained by USS Alhena in 1942.

Designed 1941, in service 1942. The Type 96 designation was assigned to fill a sequential designation gap due to its relation to the Type 95, and not denoting the year of adoption. Redesigned version of the Type 95 Mod 1 torpedo, using 38% oxygen instead of pure oxygen, to reduce starting problems. Other modifications included simplifying the design by removing the "first air vessel", a separate compressed air tank which was used to spin up the torpedo's engine before pure oxygen was supplied. The Type 96 was an interim design, introduced to address reliability problems with the Type 95 Mod 1, until the Mod 2 could be developed. Due to lower cost of manufacture, it continued to be produced throughout the war. At least 300 units were manufactured throughout 1942-1943. Used on submarines.

Specifications:

- Entered service: 1942
- Propulsion: Wet heater (kerosene-air, oxygen-enriched)
- Weight: 1,665 kg (3,671 lb)
- Length: 7.15 m (23.5 ft)
- Explosive charge: 405 kg (893 lb) Type 97
- Range and speed: 4,500 m (2.4 nmi) at 48–50 kn (89–93 km/h)

== Post-War Decade ==
Following the Japanese surrender in September 1945, the Imperial Japanese Navy ceased to exist. Along with it, further pressured by the economic hardship caused by the war's consequences, the industries involved in the production and development of torpedoes also ceased to function. One of the largest factories involved in the production and design of torpedoes, the Mitsubishi-Urakami Ordnance Works, was located in the Urakami valley; the bomb used in the atomic bombing of Nagasaki fell directly into this valley, approximately between the Mitsubishi-Urakami Ordnance Works and the Mitsubishi Steel and Arms Works. Existing stockpiles of torpedoes were already stretched thin by the ferocity of the Pacific campaign, and what remained - including design documentation not destroyed by Japanese naval authorities - was effectively taken into American custody, such as by the United States Naval Technical Mission to Japan.

The Japanese navy did not completely disappear following its dissolution and the ratification of Article 9 of the Constitution of Japan in 1946. It relied on a twilight existence which suited both the occupying Americans and the Japanese to play down. The Korean War helped change the attitude of the American government that Japan required something more than then-extant Maritime Safety Agency. In 1952, a Maritime Safety Force was organized, and then in 1954, it evolved into the Maritime Self Defense Force, effectively the present-day JMSDF.

As of the period spanning from 1952 until 1955, inventory for arming the Maritime Safety Force was being procured from the United States. This included Mark 14 and lower-cost Mark 23 21-inch torpedoes. Work on revitalizing the indigenous torpedo industry was already in progress as of at least 1953, with the Type 54 being introduced in a flawed form in 1954. In 1955, Japan received the USS Mingo, a Gato-class submarine, primarily for use as a training vessel. This submarine would receive the name Kuroshio (JDS Kuroshio, SS-501, YAC-18) in Japanese service. Serving until 1966, the JDS Kuroshio was used to test and evaluate various torpedo technologies, including the possibility of torpedo wire guidance.

== Type 54 ==
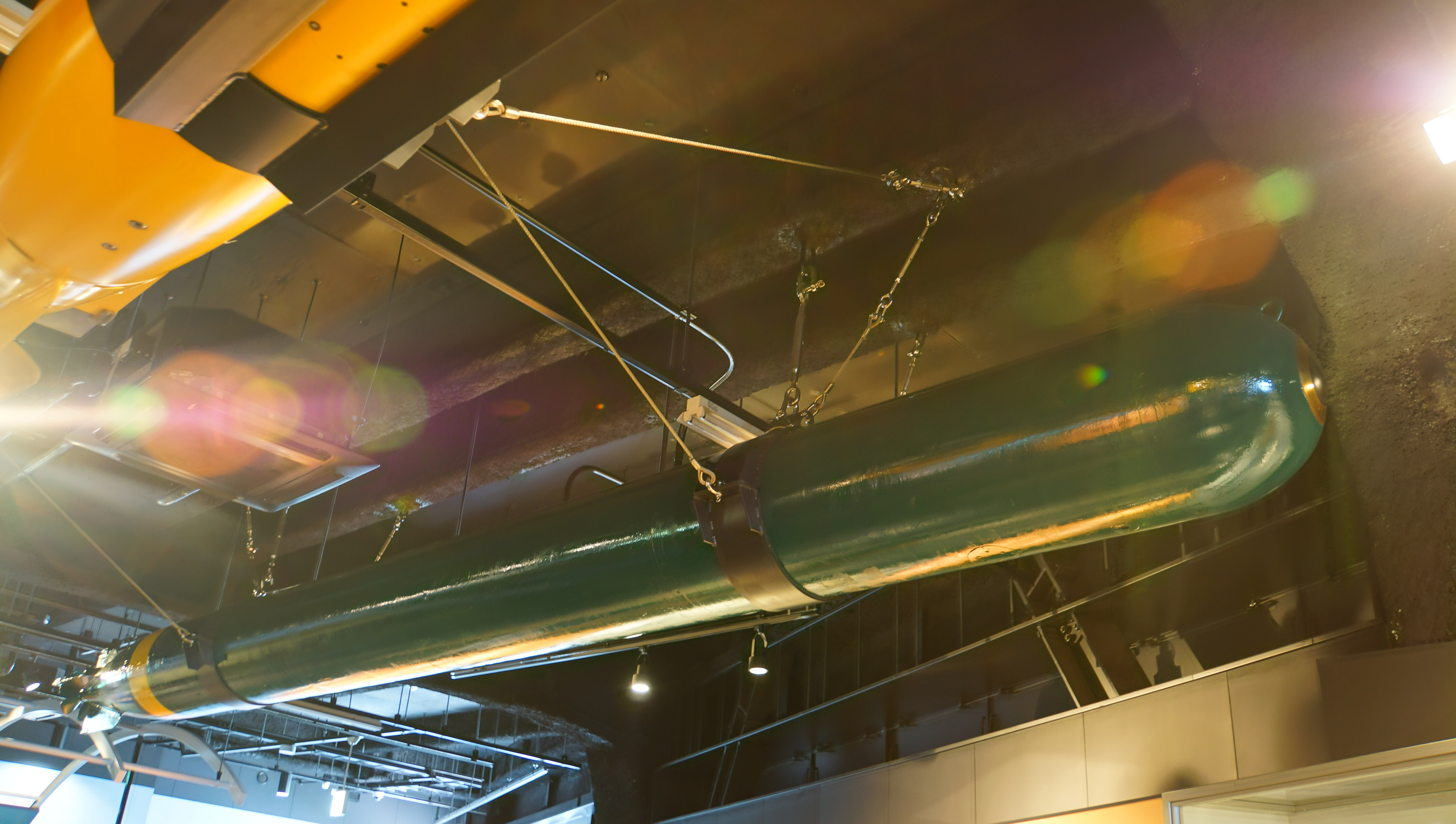
A Type 54 torpedo in the JMSDF Kure Museum.

Main article: Type 54 torpedo (ja)

Designed 1953, in service 1954 (Mod 1). Development program completed 1966 (Mod 3 Kai). The first indigenous postwar design. The project was one of the first undertaken by the newly-established Safety Agency Technical Research Institute (保安庁技術研究所), which would later become the present-day Technical Research and Development Institute (TRDI). (ja) This work began under the jurisdiction of the National Safety Agency, predating the formation of the JMSDF. The Nagasaki Shipyard of Mitsubishi Heavy Industries was tasked with much of the prototype development, with NEC designing the seeker head. During the initial development phase, the torpedo was referred to as an Acoustic Target in official documents, due to secrecy and the sensitive political situation at the time. The physical construction of the torpedo was influenced by the German G7es "Zaunkonig", and the seeker head design was influenced by the American Mark 32. Propulsion was electric (lead-acid battery). The original variant was the Type 54 Mod 1, a straight-running torpedo for use by torpedo boats. This was unsuccessful due to reliability problems, including a propensity of the torpedo to sink immediately after launch. The Type 54 Mod 2 remedied these problems and added an acoustic homing system, the first of its kind in Japan since the Second World War. Type 54 Mod 2 was only capable of seeking targets in the horizontal plane, useful for targeting vessels on the surface. The Type 54 Mod 3 added three-dimensional acoustic homing, allowing the torpedo to be used for ASW. The final version, Type 54 Mod 3 Kai, increased speed to 30 kn (56 km/h). The Type 54 was used to supplement and replace the imported Mark 23. Experiments were carried out to increase its range and speed, with an attempt to switch to silver-zinc batteries initially planned as Type 55, as well as a two-stage version reminiscent of the Italian G62ef Canguro. Phased out of service after the Mark 37 became available. Used on surface vessels such as the Ayanami, Akizuki and Kitakami-class destroyers, and submarines, such as the first postwar indigenously designed submarine JDS Oyashio.

Specifications:

- Entered service: 1954 (Mod 1), 1955 (Mod 2), 1960 (Mod 3), 1966 (Mod 3 Kai)
- Propulsion: Battery (lead-acid)
- Weight: 1,600 kg (3,500 lb)
- Length: 7.60 m (24.9 ft)
- Explosive charge: 100 kg (220 lb) TNT
- Range and speed: 6,000 m (3.2 nmi) at 24 kn (44 km/h) (Mod 1-3), 30 kn (56 km/h) (Mod 3 Kai)
- Maximum depth: Unknown, over 200 m (660 ft)

== Type 55 ==
Related article: Mark 37 torpedo

Development began after 1955, running as a cohort alongside that of the Type 54, initially as a version of the Type 54 Mod 2 with silver-zinc batteries instead of lead-acid, before the American Mark 37 became available. After local coproduction of the Mark 37 began in the 1960s, designated as the Mark 37-0-N (Mark 37 Mod 0, the version without wire guidance), the Type 55 project was significantly altered to take advantage of various modules being produced for the Mark 37-0-N, particularly the batteries, and finally most elements of the Mark 37 design. The Type 55 designation was thus ultimately given to a lengthened and modified version of the American Mark 37 torpedo manufactured in Japan. Other variants of the Mark 37 were imported, not manufactured domestically. The Mark 37 remained in service until 1987. The Type 55 designation was assigned to fill a sequential designation due to its association with the Type 54 project, and not denoting the year of adoption. Contemporary to this torpedo program, Ōshio was originally designed with two HU-201 shortened stern torpedo tubes dedicated for use of Mark 37-variant torpedoes; however, this design feature was deemed of limited effectiveness and never used. The Type 55 served as the design basis for the Type 80 and was removed from service when the Type 80 became available. In service 1964. Phased out of service after 1980; no units in service after 1984.

During the Yuyo Maru No.10 Incident in 1974, Mitsubishi Heavy Industries successfully implemented a rush modification of the common guidance system used by the Mark 37-0-N and Type 55 to give it an optional straight-run capability, overriding the doppler sonar of the seeker head.

During the JMSDF operations involved in sinking the Yuyo Maru No.10, four Mark 37 torpedoes were used, equipped with identical warheads to the ones used for the Type 55. The Type 72 was considered, but due to low inventory, could not be made available fast enough. The Narushio (SS-569) launched three weapons at the waterline, and a fourth below the keel of the burning tanker. Performance was unsatisfactory. All weapons experienced hang fire malfunctions, with explicit troubleshooting instructions to wait 60 seconds for the active torpedoes to egress from the launch tubes. The first shot experienced propulsion failure and sank to the seabed. The subsequent two weapons launched at the waterline with impact triggering functioned correctly after exiting their tubes with a delay. The fourth weapon failed to trigger its proximity fuze and harmlessly passed below the target's keel. The experience caused a re-evaluation of the lethality of the Mark 37-pattern warhead, as well as work to remedy various reliability problems.

Specifications:

- Entered service: 1964
- Propulsion: Battery (silver oxide)
- Weight: Unknown, above 700 kg
- Length: Unknown, approximately 5.00 m (16.40 ft)
- Explosive charge: 150 kg (330 lb) HBX-3
- Range and speed: Unknown, approximately 15–35 km (8.1–18.9 nmi) at 22–35 kn (41–65 km/h) depending on speed
- Maximum depth: Unknown, over 300 m (980 ft)
- Notes: Estimates only. Data extrapolated based on what is known about the predecessor Mark 37 and successor Type 80.

== Type 72 ==
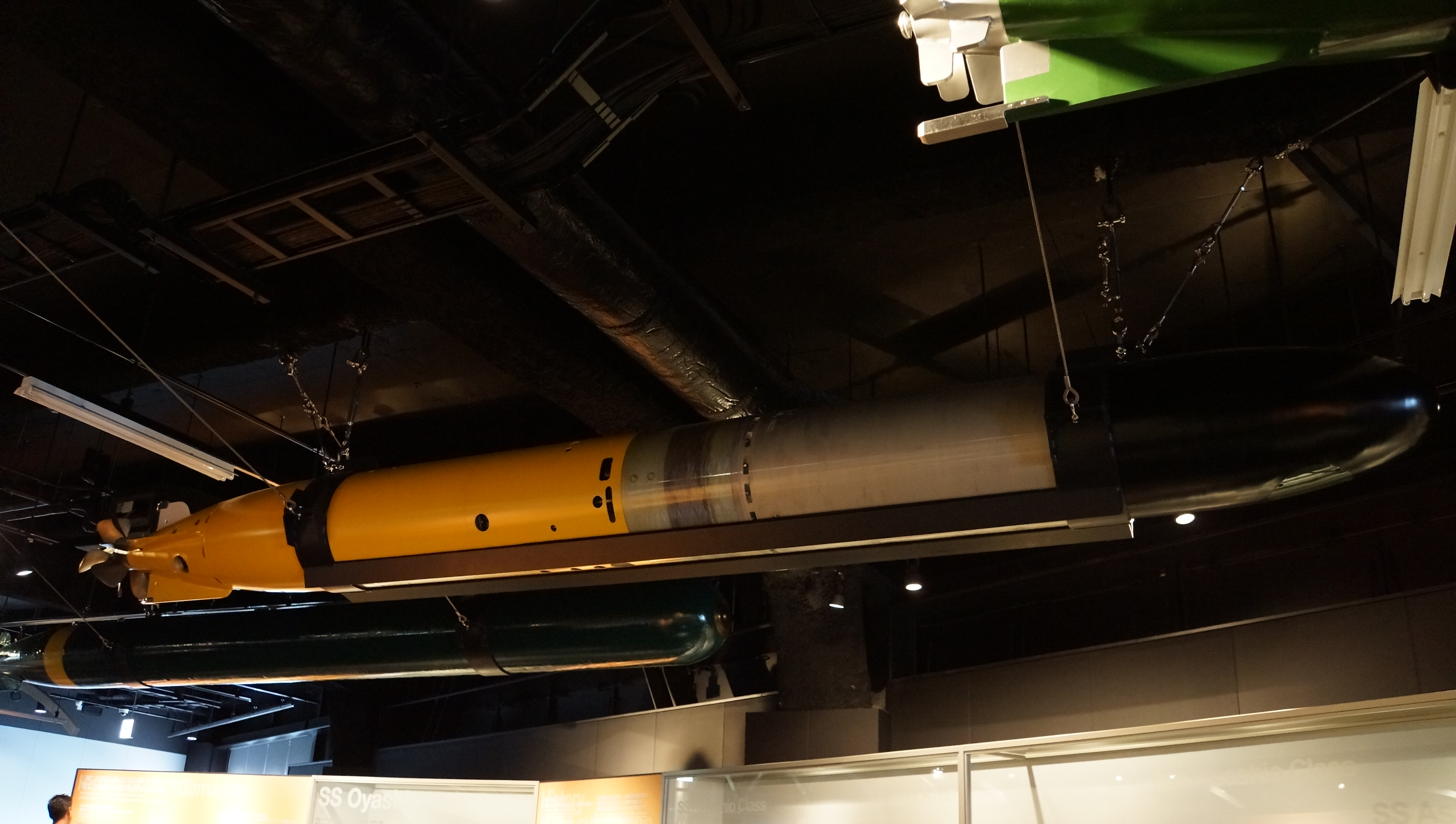
A Type 72 torpedo in the JMSDF Kure Museum.

Main article: Type 72 torpedo

Designed 1966, in service 1972. Straight-running torpedo. Beginning in 1954, research on a high-speed straight-running torpedo was conducted; this project was codenamed G-5 and used a reciprocating kerosene-oxygen wet heater engine derived from that of the Type 93. The G-5 project resulted in a prototype with a speed in excess of 50 kn (93 km/h). In 1965, the requirements were altered and the project was redesignated G-5B. The G-5B was initially projected to use ethanol as fuel and nitric acid as the oxidizer; the final version used high-test peroxide (hydrogen peroxide) as the oxidizer. The exhaust consisted of water vapor and carbon dioxide, which eliminated the formation of a surface wake trail. Used on submarines such as the Uzushio class and Type 11 torpedo boats. Following the adoption of the Harpoon missile in 1980s, the non-homing Type 72 was deemed obsolescent. The first JMSDF submarine to be equipped for launch of the UGM-84 was the Nadashio (SS-577), with all subsequent submarines being likewise equipped after 1983. The torpedoes were withdrawn from service in 1994 and eventually scrapped. A sectioned Type 72 is exhibited at the Sasebo Maritime Self-Defense Force Museum.

Specifications:

- Entered service: 1972
- Propulsion: Bipropellant H_{2}O_{2}-Ethanol
- Weight: Unknown
- Length: 6.25 m (20.5 ft)
- Explosive charge: 300 kg (660 lb) HBX-1
- Range and speed: 10,000 m (5.4 nmi) at 65 kn (120 km/h), 20,000 m (11 nmi) at 45 kn (83 km/h)
- Maximum depth: Shallow setting (surface runner)

== Type 80 ==
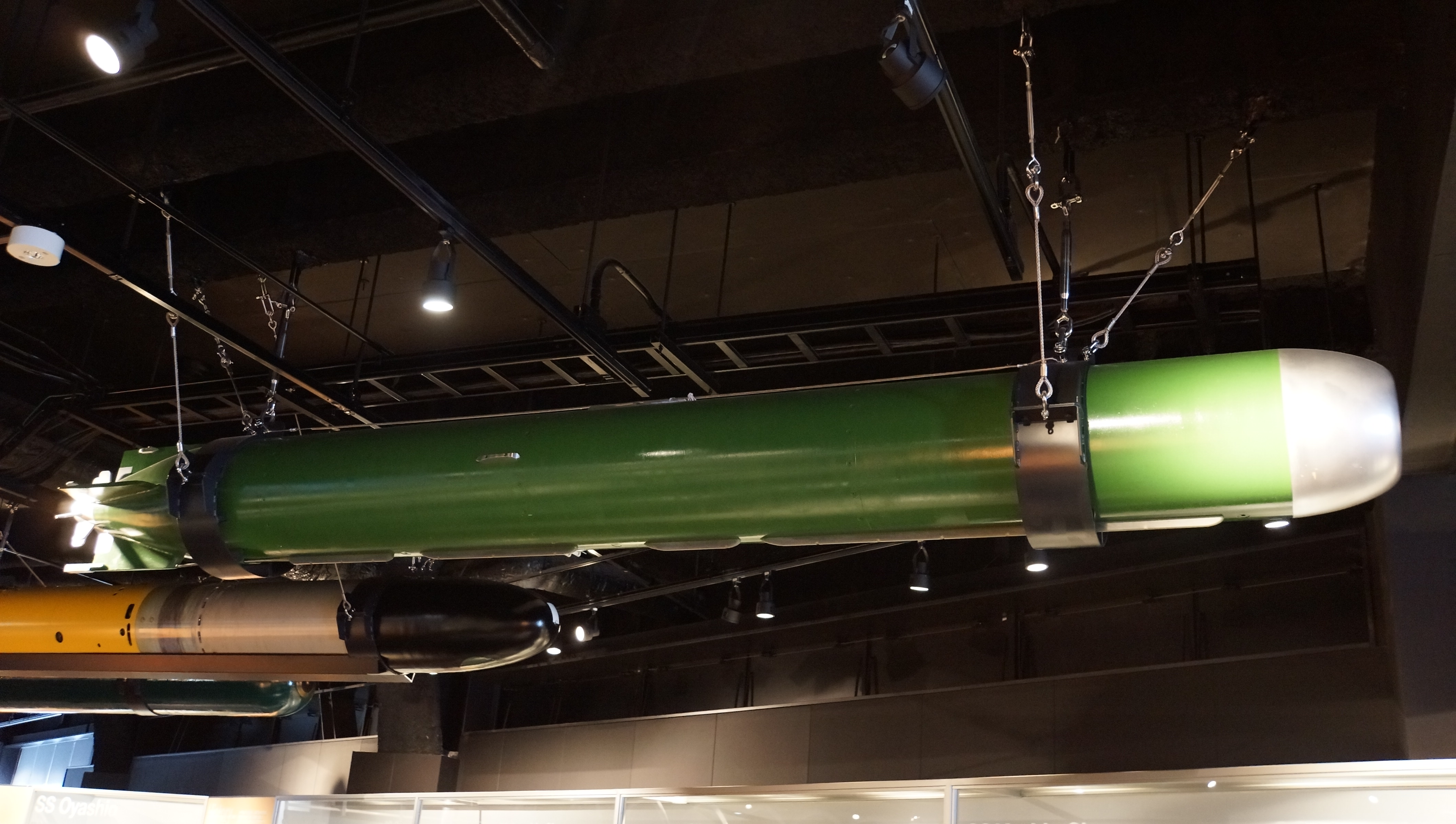
A Type 80 torpedo in the JMSDF Kure Museum.

Main article: Type 80 torpedo

Development began in 1965 and concluded in 1975. Unit trials began the same year. Accepted for service in 1980, with mass production commencing in 1984. The weapon codename during development was G-RX, also later termed G-RX1, and the equipment designator for the completed article was G-11. Re-engineered and lengthened variant of the American Mark 37 torpedo, with superior performance. The diameter of the torpedo body is the same as the American Mark 37, at 483 mm; likewise, the torpedo is wire-guided, with active and passive acoustic homing capabilities. The torpedo possesses pattern-running capabilities for autonomous target search. Some of the unit specifics remain classified; remains in active service as of 2024. Used on submarines.

Specifications:

- Entered service: 1980
- Propulsion: Battery (silver oxide)
- Weight: Unknown, above 700 kg
- Length: 5.00 m (16.40 ft)
- Explosive charge: 150 kg (330 lb) HBX-3
- Range and speed: 14,630 m (7.90 nmi) at 34 kn (63 km/h), 33,000 m (18 nmi) at 22 kn (41 km/h)
- Maximum depth: Unknown, over 300 m (980 ft)

== Type 89 ==
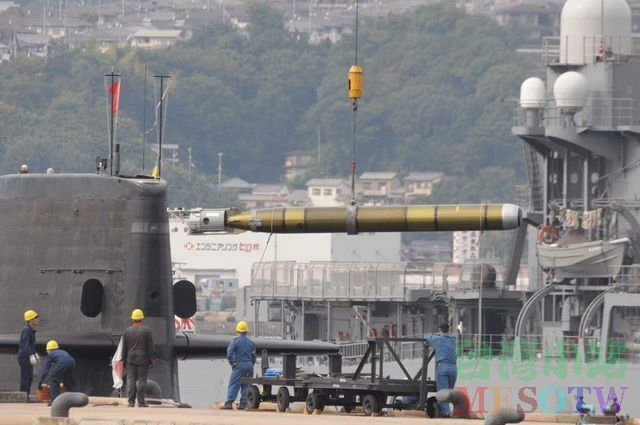
A Type 89 torpedo being loaded onto a Sōryū-class submarine

Main article: Type 89 torpedo

Development work began in 1970 and was completed in 1984. The project was codenamed G-RX2 and ran in tandem with G-RX1. Initially the project was claimed to be complete in 1983 and slated for adoption in 1985, but incremental design work caused it to be finally adopted for service in 1989. Uses Otto Fuel II in its propulsion system. In 1993, an improved Type 89B variant was adopted. Wire-guided with active and passive acoustic homing, and a maximum depth of 900m for its Type 89B variant. The Type 89 features similar performance to the American Mark 48 torpedo; Japan never sought licensed production of either the Mark 48 or its ADCAP variant. Some of the Type 89 unit specifics remain classified. Used on submarines.

Specifications:

- Entered service: 1989
- Propulsion: Swashplate monopropellant Otto Fuel II
- Weight: 1,760 kg (3,880 lb)
- Length: 6.25 m (20.5 ft)
- Explosive charge: 267 kg (589 lb) high explosive
- Range and speed: 39,000 m (21 nmi) at 55 kn (102 km/h), 50,000 m (27 nmi) at 40 kn (74 km/h)
- Maximum depth: 500–640 m (1,640–2,100 ft) Type 89, 900 m (3,000 ft) Type 89B

== Type 18 ==
Main article: Type 18 torpedo

Development began in 2012, adopted for service in 2018. First production deliveries were made in 2022; incremental development continued between 2018 and 2022. Successor to the Type 89, using Otto Fuel II propellant like its predecessor. Shares many elements of the Type 89 design, including the propulsion system. Wire-guided with passive and active acoustic homing; stated capabilities include advanced target and decoy recognition, as well as increased stealth. The weapon is capable of assessing the shape of the sonar contact, and uses magnetometric sensors both as a proximity fuze and to identify decoys. Specifications remain classified. Used on submarines.

A version of the Type 18 possessing a redesigned, enhanced-stealth propulsion system was developed in tandem with the principal weapon. This version was developed between 2018 and 2022 at an estimated cost of 9.7 billion yen, and for fiscal year 2023, 8.6 billion yen was allocated for acquisition of the redesigned Type 18. The new torpedo is designated Type 18B. According to a Mitsubishi Heavy Industries press release, the axial pumps have been modified to reduce self-noise.

On 27 June 2026, as part of Exercise Valiant Shield, the JS Jingei (SS-515) carried out a live fire exercise, launching a torpedo at and sinking the decommissioned USS Juneau (LPD-10). While the exact type of torpedo used has not been revealed, the Taigei-class submarines are associated with the Type 18, and the nature of the exercise suggests that the latest weapon system which necessitates testing would have been employed.

Specifications:

- Entered service: 2018 (Type 18), 2023 (Type 18B)
- Propulsion: Swashplate monopropellant Otto Fuel II
- Weight: 1,800 kg (4,000 lb)
- Length: 6.25 m (20.5 ft)
- Explosive charge: Unknown, similar to Type 89
- Range and speed: Unknown, similar to Type 89
- Maximum depth: Unknown, similar to Type 89

== See also ==
- Japanese 32 cm torpedo
- Japanese 45 cm torpedo
- Japanese 61 cm torpedo
- List of torpedoes
