= 18-inch Mark 30 torpedo =

Mark 30 torpedo
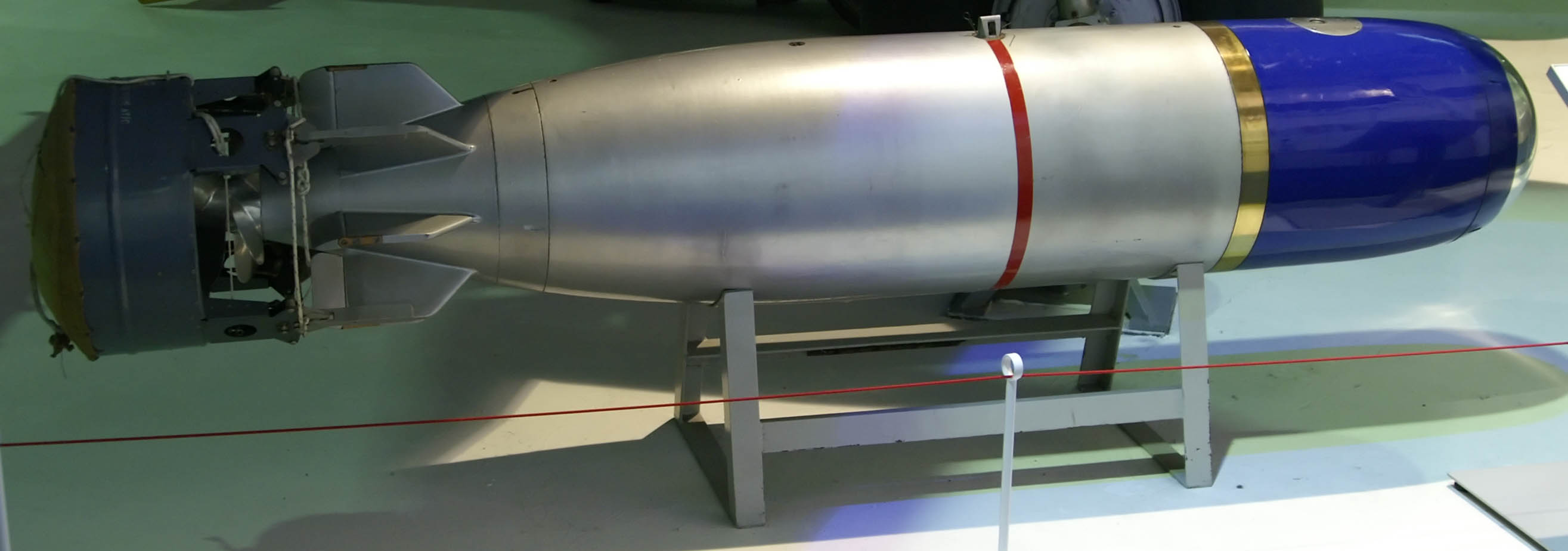
- A Mark 30 torpedo at the Royal Air Force Museum London in Hendon
- Type: Homing torpedo
- Place of origin: United Kingdom

Service history
- In service: 1954-1970
- Used by: Royal Navy; Royal Air Force

Production history
- Designed: 1950
- No. built: 1200
- Variants: Mark 30 Mod 1 torpedo

Specifications
- Diameter: 20 inches
- Effective firing range: 2500 yards
- Engine: Electric
- Maximum speed: 25 knots
- Launch platform: Aircraft

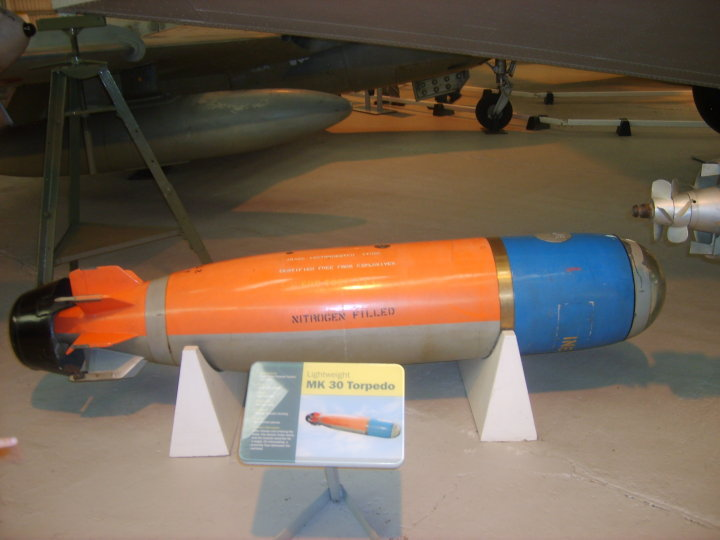
Mark 30 torpedo on display at DCAE Cosford

The Mark 30 torpedo was a British 18-inch air dropped anti-submarine passive acoustic homing torpedo. The torpedo was air dropped from the Hawker-Siddeley Nimrod and Avro Shackleton aircraft.

The Mark 30, also referred to by its project name as Dealer B, was an eight-fin passive homing torpedo using conventional propellers. Issued in June 1954, Mark 30 production saw approximately 1,200 being built. It served in both the Royal Navy and Royal Air Force until 1975. Development on a variant, the Mark 30 Mod 1, was cancelled in 1955 after the Royal Navy decided to purchase the American Mark 43 torpedo as a replacement.
