= Mark 43 torpedo =

American antisubmarine torpedo

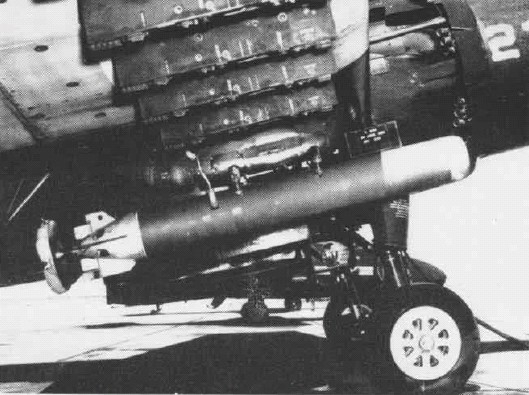
- Mark 43 torpedo mounted on an AD Skyraider
- Type: Antisubmarine torpedo
- Place of origin: United States

Service history
- In service: 1951–57
- Used by: United States Navy; Royal Navy

Production history
- Designer: Brush Development Company; Naval Ordnance Test Station Pasadena
- Designed: 1950
- Manufacturer: Brush Electronics Company
- Produced: 1951–59
- No. built: 5000
- Variants: Mark 43 Mod 1 Mark 43 Mod 3

Specifications
- Mass: 265 pounds (Mod 3)
- Length: 91.5 inches
- Diameter: 10 inches
- Effective firing range: 4500 yards (Mod 3) (6-minute search duration)
- Warhead: Mk 100, HBX (Mod 3)
- Warhead weight: 54 pounds (Mod 3)
- Detonation mechanism: Mk 19 Mod 13 contact exploder
- Engine: Electric
- Maximum speed: 21 knots (Mod 3)
- Guidance system: Helix search
- Launch platform: Helicopters, fixed-wing aircraft, and surface ships

The 10" Mark 43 torpedo was the first and smallest of the United States Navy light-weight anti-submarine torpedoes. This electrically propelled 10-inch (25-cm) torpedo was 92 inches (2.3 m) long and weighed 265 pounds (120 kg). Described as "a submersible guided missile", the torpedo was designed for air or surface launch. The Mod 0 configuration was designed for launch from helicopters or fixed-wing aircraft, and the Mod 1 configuration was for helicopters only. Both were electrically driven and deep-diving, but had relatively short range. They were classified as obsolete in the 1960s.

The Royal Navy purchased fifty examples of the Mark 43 in favour of an improved version of their 18 inch Mark 30 "Dealer B"

== See also ==
- Mark 34 torpedo
