= Mark 32 torpedo =

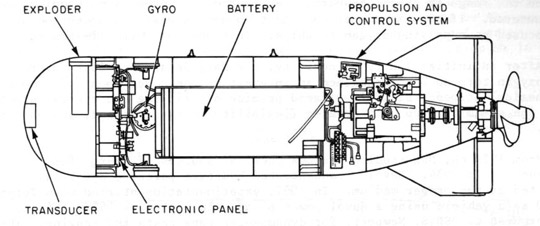
- Diagram of the Mark 32 torpedo
- Type: Acoustic torpedo
- Place of origin: United States

Service history
- In service: 1950-1955
- Used by: United States Navy

Production history
- Designer: General Electric; Ordnance Research Laboratory, Pennsylvania State University
- Designed: 1950
- Manufacturer: Philco; Naval Ordnance Station Forest Park; Leeds and Northrup
- No. built: 3300

Specifications
- Mass: 700 pounds
- Length: 83 inches
- Diameter: 19 inches with 25.4-inch fins
- Effective firing range: 9600 yards (24-minute search duration)
- Warhead: Mk 32 Mod 1, HBX
- Warhead weight: 107 pounds
- Detonation mechanism: Mk 19 Mods 4 and 11 contact exploder
- Engine: Electric
- Maximum speed: 12 knots
- Guidance system: Helix search
- Launch platform: Destroyers and aircraft

The Mark 32 torpedo was the first active acoustic antisubmarine homing torpedo in United States Navy service. The Mark 32 was withdrawn from service use with the introduction of the Mark 43 torpedo.

Ten were manufactured by Leeds & Northrup, Philadelphia during War II, and about 3,300 were manufactured by a combination of the Philco Corporation, Philadelphia, and the Naval Ordnance Plant, Forest Park, Illinois.

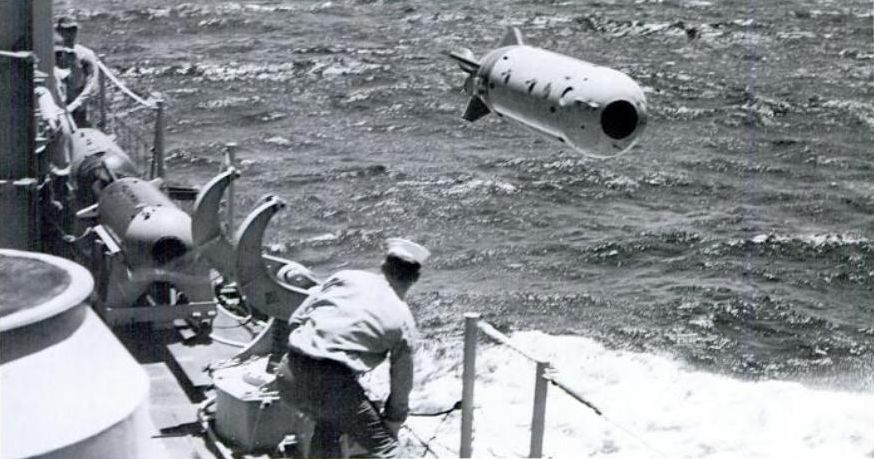
A Mark 32 torpedo being launched by a Mark 2 over-the-side launcher.
