= Mark 34 torpedo =

Acoustic torpedo

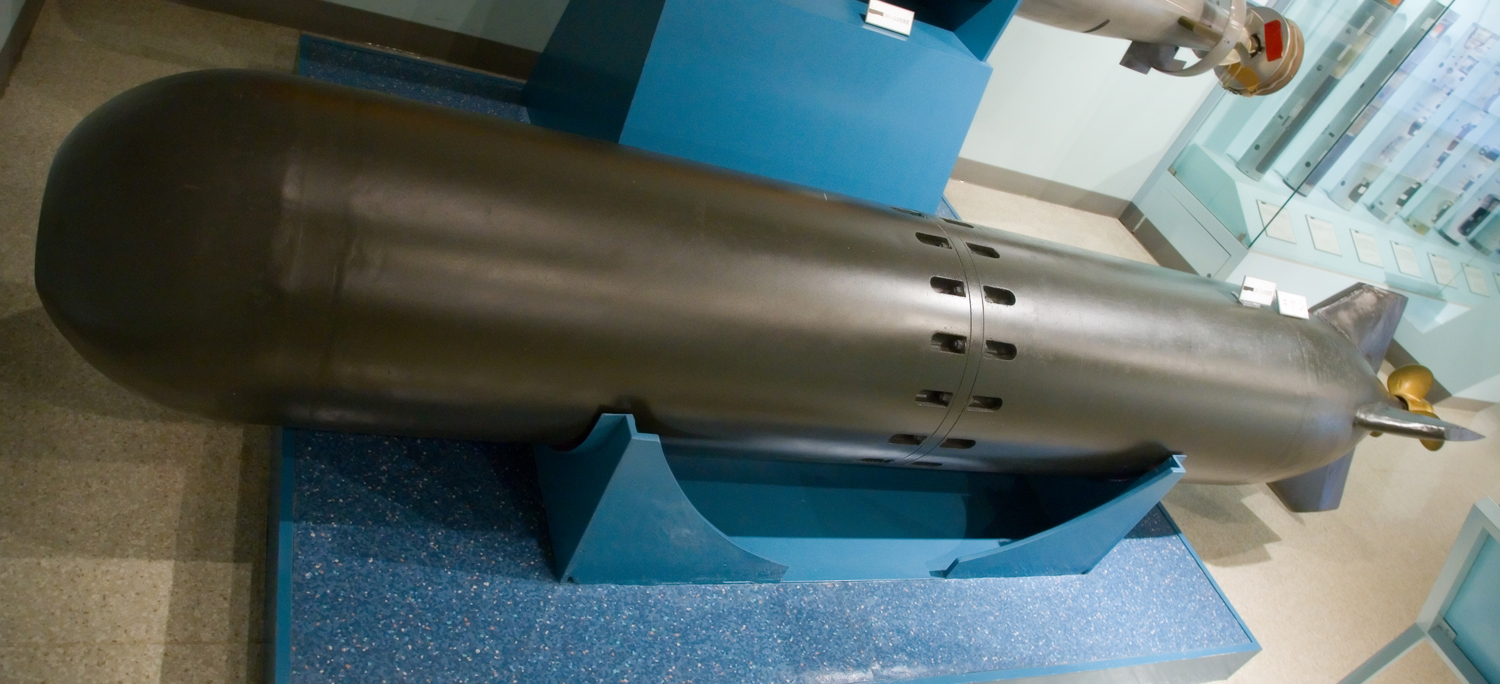
- Mark 34 torpedo at Kanoya Museum, Japan
- Type: Acoustic torpedo
- Place of origin: United States

Service history
- In service: 1948-1958
- Used by: United States Navy

Production history
- Designer: Naval Mine Warfare Test Station
- Designed: 1944
- Manufacturer: American Machine and Foundry; Naval Ordnance Station Forest Park; Naval Mine Depot
- Produced: 1948-1954
- No. built: 4050

Specifications
- Mass: 1150 pounds
- Length: 125 inches
- Diameter: 19 inches (26.4 inches across fins)
- Effective firing range: 3600-12,000 yards
- Warhead: Mk 34 Mod 1, HBX
- Warhead weight: 116 pounds
- Detonation mechanism: Mk 19 Mod 7 contact exploder
- Engine: Electric
- Maximum speed: 11-17 knots (6-30 minutes search duration)
- Guidance system: Random search circles
- Launch platform: Antisubmarine aircraft

The Mark 34 torpedo (initially Mine Mk 44, technically Mk 34 mod 1) was a United States torpedo developed that entered service in 1948. It was an improved version of the Mark 24 FIDO passive acoustic homing torpedo developed during World War II for launch from fixed-wing aircraft. The principal differences from the Mark 24 were the use of two propulsion batteries, which could be used in parallel while the torpedo was searching for a target to provide greater endurance and in series to provide greater speed in attack mode.

Approximately 4,050 were produced between 1948 and 1954 before production was ceased. The torpedo was replaced in U.S. service with the Mark 43 torpedo around 1958.

== Specifications ==
- Length : 125 in (320 cm)
- Diameter : 19 in (48 cm)
- Fin span : 26.4 in (67 cm)
- Weight : 1,150 lb (520 kg)
- Warhead : 116 lb (53 kg) HBX
- Speed :
  - 11 knots (20 km/h; 13 mph) (search mode)
  - 17 knots (31 km/h; 20 mph) (attack mode)
- Range and endurance :
  - 30 minutes or 12,000 yards (11,000 m) at 11 knots (20 km/h)
  - 6 to 8 minutes or 3,600 yards (3,300 m) at 17 knots (31 km/h)
