= Mark 23 torpedo =

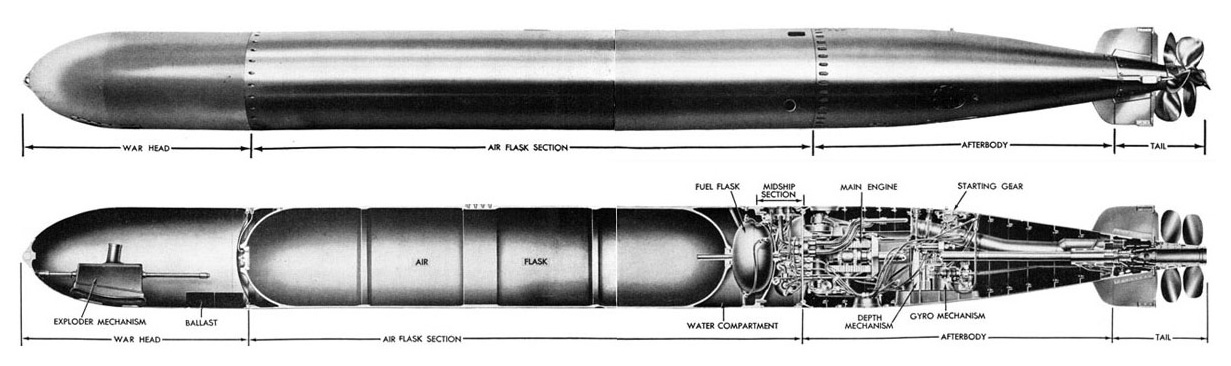
- Mark 14 torpedo side view and interior mechanisms; the Mark 14 and Mark 23 were physically identical and shared the same maintenance manual
- Type: Anti-surface ship torpedo
- Place of origin: United States

Service history
- In service: 1943–1946
- Used by: United States Navy
- Wars: World War II

Production history
- Designer: Naval Torpedo Station Newport
- Designed: 1943
- Manufacturer: Naval Torpedo Station Newport; Naval Torpedo Station Keyport; Naval Ordnance Plant St. Louis
- No. built: 9600

Specifications
- Mass: 3,259 pounds
- Length: 246 inches
- Diameter: 21 inches
- Effective firing range: 4,500 yards
- Warhead: Mk 16 Mod 6, HBX
- Warhead weight: 643 pounds
- Detonation mechanism: Mk 6 Mod 13 contact exploder
- Engine: Turbine
- Maximum speed: 46.3 knots
- Guidance system: Gyroscope
- Launch platform: Submarines

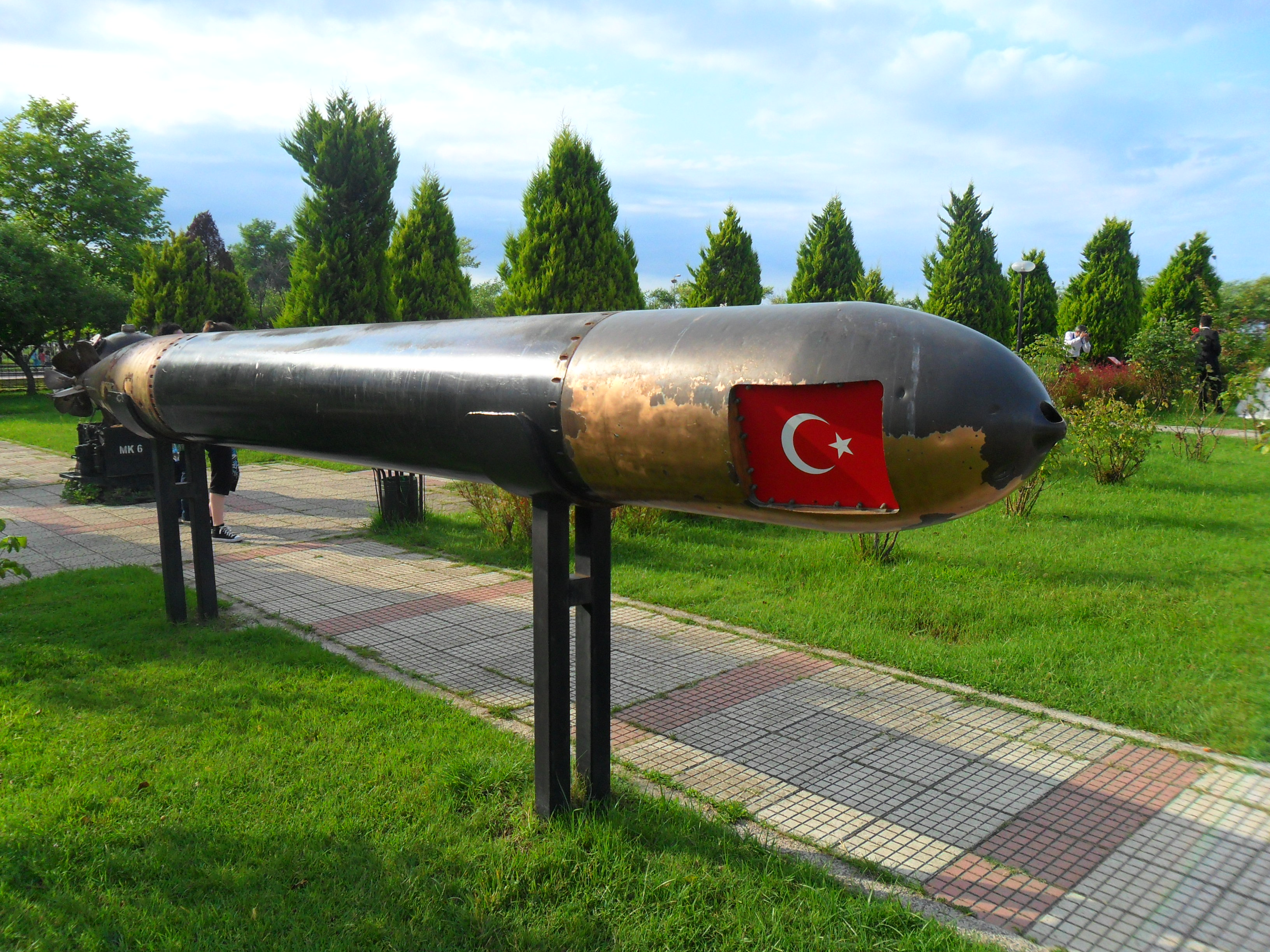

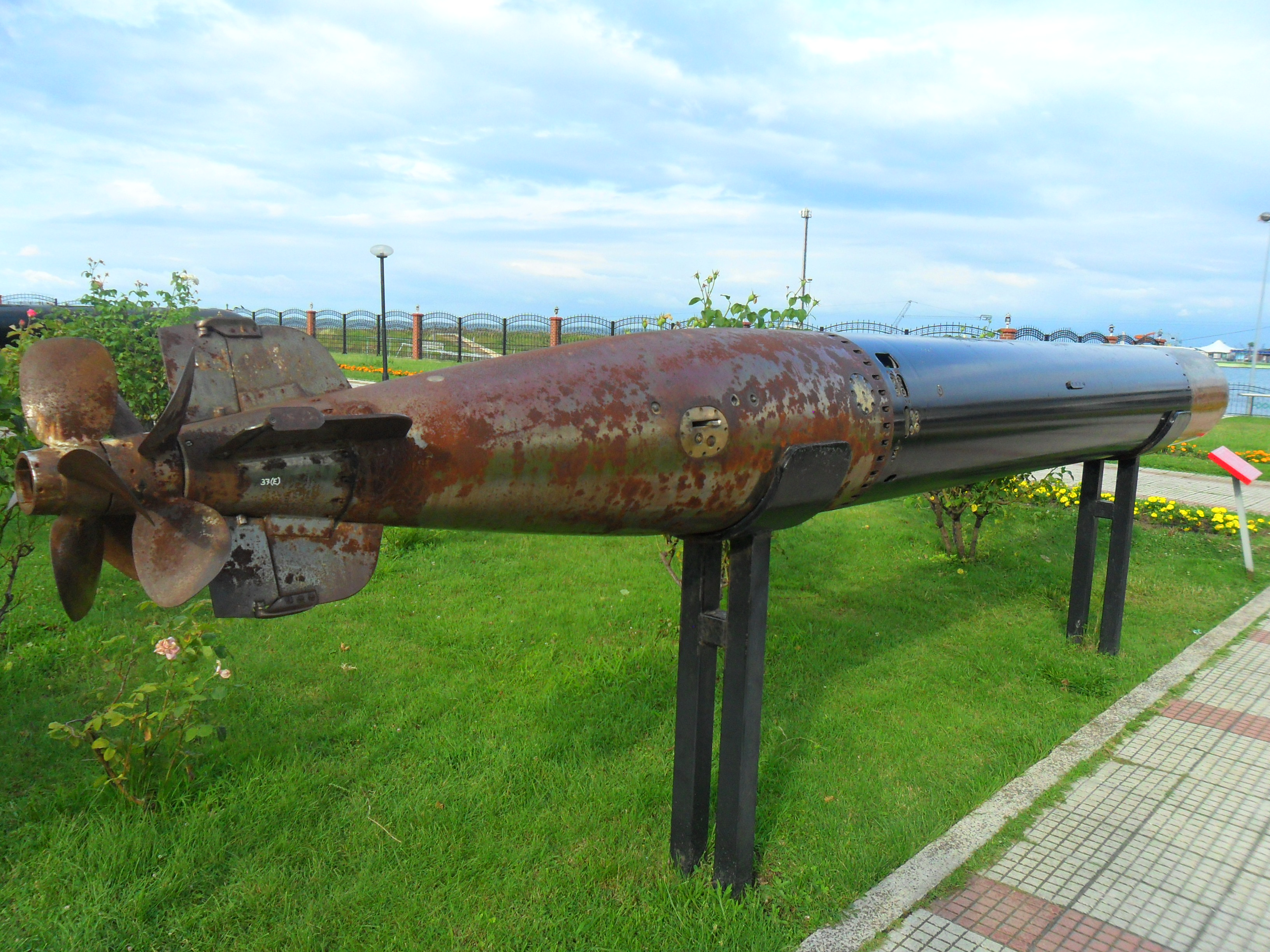

The Mark 23 torpedo was a submarine-launched anti-surface ship torpedo designed and built by the Naval Torpedo Station for the United States Navy in World War II. It was essentially a Mark 14 torpedo, modified via the removal of its low-speed, long-range setting, leaving the high-speed, short-range feature in place.

It was developed with the high-speed feature of the Mark 14 torpedo in mind, as earlier in the war, the low-speed feature of the Mark 14 was rarely used. However, during the latter stages of the war, fewer targets and better tactics necessitated firing from longer ranges and the Mark 14, with its low-speed, long-range feature, became the preferred weapon. Many of the Mark 23s were scrapped or converted to Mark 14s, while other units were cannibalized for spare parts.

== See also ==
- American 21 inch torpedo
